= 2018 Balestier Khalsa season =

Balestier Khalsa
2018 season
- Chairman: Darwin Jalil
- Head coach: Marko Kraljević
- Stadium: Toa Payoh Stadium
- Singapore Premier League: 6th (Currently)
- Singapore Cup: –
- Top goalscorer: League: Keegan Linderboom (5 goals) Currently; All: Keegan Linderboom (5 goals) Currently

The 2018 season was Balestier Khalsa's 23rd consecutive season in the top flight of Singapore football and in the Singapore Premier League and the Singapore Cup.

== Squad ==
As of 11 June 2018.

Squad No.	Name	Date of birth (age)	Previous club
Goalkeepers
1	Hafiz Ahmad ^{U23}		Home United
12	Nazri Sabri	20 September 1989 (age 37)	Eunos Crescent
13	Zacharial Leong ^{U23}		
19	Zaiful Nizam	24 July 1987 (age 39)	
Defenders
2	Fadli Kamis	7 November 1992 (age 33)	
3	Shaqi Sulaiman ^{U23}	10 November 1998 (age 27)	Hougang United
4	Khalili Khalif ^{U23}	3 January 1997 (age 29)	Home United
5	Nurisham Jupri ^{U23}	14 December 1995 (age 30)	Eunos Crescent
6	Nurullah Hussein	9 May 1993 (age 33)	
9	Zakir Samsudin	18 January 1994 (age 32)	LionsXII
10	Sufianto Salleh	9 March 1993 (age 33)	Home United
15	Sheikh Abdul Hadi	24 March 1992 (age 34)	
18	Ahmad Syahir Sahimi	10 April 1992 (age 34)	
25	Sharin Majid ^{U23}	31 March 1995 (age 31)	Warriors FC
Midfielders
7	Hazzuwan Halim	2 February 1994 (age 32)	
8	Raihan Rahman	7 February 1991 (age 35)	
11	Huzaifah Aziz	24 June 1994 (age 32)	
14	Afiq Salman Tan ^{U23}	28 November 1995 (age 30)	
16	Khairuddin Omar ^{U23}	8 March 1996 (age 30)	
17	Fariz Faizal ^{U23}	17 October 1996 (age 29)	
22	(Croatia) Vedran Mesec	20 February 1988 (age 38)	(Slovenia) NK Aluminij
24	Noor Akid Nordin ^{U23}	28 October 1996 (age 29)	Home United
58	Daniel Hazreel ^{U23}	31 May 1999 (age 27)	Kembagan United
68	(Austria) Sanjin Vrebac ^{U19}	25 February 2000 (age 26)	(Germany) VfR Fischeln
70	Haiqal Adnan ^{U19}		
Strikers
21	(New Zealand) Keegan Linderboom	26 September 1989 (age 37)	(New Zealand) Waitakere United
23	Akbar Shah ^{U23}	29 May 1996 (age 30)	Home United
67	(Serbia) Dusan Marinkovic ^{U19}		(Serbia) FK Internacional

== Coaching staff ==
Position	Name
Head coach	(Croatia) Marko Kraljević
Assistant coach	Haris Sumri
Goalkeeping coach	Koh Chuan Hwee/ Rizal Abdul Rahman
Fitness coach	Rosman Sulaiman
Team Chairman	Darwin Jalil
Physiotherapist	Mohamed Nasser
Kitman	Abdul Latiff

== Transfer ==
=== Pre-season transfer ===
==== In ====
Position	Player	Transferred From	Ref
GK	Nazri Sabri	Eunos Crescent (NFL Club)	
GK	Hafiz Ahmad	Home United	
DF	Sufianto Salleh	Home United	2 Years Contract
DF	Nurullah Hussein	Free Agent	2 Years Contract
DF	Shaqi Sulaiman	Hougang United	2 Years Contract
DF	Sharin Majid	Warriors FC	
DF	Khalili Khalif	Home United Prime League	
MF	Daniel Hazreel	Kembangan United FC (NFL Club)	
MF	Nurisham Jupri	Eunos Crescent (NFL Club)	
MF	Noor Akid Nordin	Home United	2 Years Contract
MF	Afiq Salman Tan	Free Agent	2 Years Contract
MF	(New Zealand) Keegan Linderboom	(New Zealand) Waitakere United	
FW	Akbar Shah	Home United	2 Years Contract
FW	(Croatia) Vedran Mesec	(Slovenia) NK Aluminij	

==== Out ====
Position	Player	Transferred To	Ref
GK	A. Renonathan		
GK	Naqiuddin Nodin		
GK	Hamzah Fazil		
DF	Zulkhair Mustaffa	SAFSA (NFL Club)	loan
DF	Tajeli Salamat	Warriors FC	
DF	Ashrul Syafeeq	Hougang United	
DF	Azmeerudin Jamludain	Eunos Crescent FC (NFL Club)	
DF	Hanafi Salleh		
MF	(Myanmar) Kyaw Zayar Win		
MF	(Myanmar) Nanda Lin Kyaw Chit	(Thailand) Prachuap FC	
MF	(Myanmar) Aung Kyaw Naing	(Thailand) Angthong FC	
MF	Mahathir Azeman		
MF	Jonathan Tan	SAFSA (NFL Club)	loan
MF	Hanafi Akbar	Tampines Rovers	
MF	Shah Hirul		
MF	Danial Farhan Tan		

==== Retained ====
Position	Player	Ref
GK	Zaiful Nizam	2 years contract
DF	Fadli Kamis	2 years contract
DF	Sheikh Abdul Hadi	2 years contract
DF	Ahmad Syahir	1 year contract
MF	Raihan Rahman	2 years contract
MF	Huzaifah Aziz	2 years contract
MF	Hazzuwan Halim	2 years contract

==== Promoted ====
Position	Player	Ref
GK	Zacharial Leong	
MF	Fariz Faizal	2 Years Contract
MF	Khairuddin Omar	2 Years Contract

=== Mid-season transfer ===
==== In ====
Position	Player	Transferred From	Ref
DF	Zakir Samsudin	Free Agent	
MF	(Austria) Sanjin Vrebac	(Germany) VfR Fischeln	Balestier Khalsa U19
FW	(Serbia) Dusan Marinkovic	(Serbia) FK Internacional	Balestier Khalsa U19

== Friendly ==
=== Pre-Season Friendly ===
Win Draw Loss

31 January 2018 1	Young Lions (Singapore)	0–0	Balestier Khalsa	Jalan Besar Stadium
1700 hours

9 February 2018 2	Balestier Khalsa	1–0	Warriors FC	Choa Chu Kang Stadium
1900 hours	Hazzuwan Halim 5'

24 February 2018 3	Balestier Khalsa	3–1	Balestier United	Toa Payoh Stadium

3 March 2018 4	Balestier Khalsa	0–1	Geylang International	Bedok Stadium
			Darren Teh

10 March 2018 5	Balestier Khalsa	0–1	Malaysia U18	Toa Payoh Stadium
1900 hours			72'

== Team statistics ==
=== Appearances and goals ===
As of 29 September 2018

Numbers in parentheses denote appearances as substitute.

No.	Pos.	Player	Sleague		Singapore Cup		Total	
No.	Pos.	Player	Apps.	Goals	Apps.	Goals	Apps.	Goals
1	GK	Hafiz Ahmad	0	0	0	0	0	0
2	DF	Fadli Kamis	23	4	5	0	28	4
3	DF	Shaqi Sulaiman	14	0	5	0	19	0
4	DF	Khalili Khalif	3(4)	0	4	0	11	0
5	DF	Nurisham Jupri	10(2)	0	0	0	12	0
6	DF	Nurullah Hussein	13(2)	2	3(1)	0	19	2
7	MF	Hazzuwan Halim	19(4)	4	5	3	28	6
8	MF	Raihan Rahman	5	0	0	0	5	0
9	DF	Zakir Samsudin	0(4)	1	0(3)	0	4	1
10	DF	Sufianto Salleh	12(5)	0	1(2)	0	20	0
11	MF	Huzaifah Aziz	20(1)	4	5	1	26	5
12	GK	Nazri Sabri	0	0	0	0	0	0
13	GK	Zacharial Leong	0	0	0	0	0	0
14	MF	Afiq Tan	10(3)	0	0(2)	0	14	0
15	DF	Sheikh Abdul Hadi	16(1)	1	2	0	19	1
16	MF	Khairuddin Omar	3 (4)	0	0	0	7	0
17	MF	Fariz Faizal	14(7)	0	5	0	26	0
18	DF	Ahmad Syahir	16(5)	0	4	0	25	0
19	GK	Zaiful Nizam (captain)	24	0	4	0	28	0
21	MF	(New Zealand) Keegan Linderboom	15(2)	5	5	1	22	6
22	FW	(Croatia) Vedran Mesec	14	2	3	0	17	2
23	MF	Akbar Shah	5(9)	1	0(3)	0	16	1
24	MF	Noor Akid Nordin	16(5)	1	1	0	22	1
25	DF	Sharin Majid	5	0	0	0	5	0
58	MF	Daniel Hazreel	0 (2)	0	0	0	2	0
67	MF	(Serbia) Dusan Marinkovic	0 (2)	0	0	0	2	0
68	MF	(Austria) Sanjin Vrebac	8(1)	0	2	0	11	0
70	MF	Haiqal Adnan	0 (1)	0	0	0	1	0

== Competitions ==
=== Overview ===
Competition	Record							
Competition	P	W	D	L	GF	GA	GD	Win %
Singapore Premier League	24	7	6	11	25	36	−11	29.17
Singapore Cup	5	1	3	1	5	6	−1	20.00
Total	29	8	9	12	30	42	−12	27.59

=== Singapore Premier League ===
Win Draw Loss

4 April 2018 Round 1	Home United	3–1	Balestier Khalsa	Bishan Stadium
	Sirina Camara 77'; Song Ui-young 88'; Shahril Ishak 90+3'		Keegan Linderboom 27' (pen.)	Referee: Ahmad A'Qashah (Singapore)

8 April 2018 Round 2	Balestier Khalsa	0–1	(Japan) Albirex Niigata (S)	Toa Payoh Stadium
			Sheikh Abdul Hadi 76' (o.g.)	Referee: Nathan Chan (Singapore)

11 April 2018 Round 3	Balestier Khalsa	3–1	(Singapore) Young Lions	Toa Payoh Stadium
	Vedran Mesec 39'; Keegan Linderboom 60'; Sheikh Abdul Hadi 74'		Prakash Raj 66'

14 April 2018 Round 4	Geylang International	0–1	Balestier Khalsa	Bedok Stadium
			Fadli Kamis 19' (yellow card) 78'; Afiq Salman Tan (yellow card) 46'; Huzaifah Aziz (yellow card) 75'

22 April 2018 Round 5	Hougang United	1–1	Balestier Khalsa	Hougang Stadium
	Iqbal Hussain 48'; Fabian Kwok 34'; Syahiran Miswan 61'; Illyas Lee (yellow card) 85'		Keegan Linderboom 9'; Huzaifah Aziz 73'	Referee: Muhammad Taqi Aljaafari Bin Jahari (Singapore)

29 April 2018 Round 6	Balestier Khalsa	2–1	Warriors FC	Toa Payoh Stadium
	Keegan Linderboom 26'; Noor Akid Nordin 50'; Fadli Kamis (red card) 67'; Sufianto Salleh (yellow card) 89'		Jonathan Béhé 74'; Hafiz Sulaiman (yellow card) 15'	Referee: Ahmad A'Qashah (Singapore)

2 May 2018 Round 7	Tampines Rovers	1–0	Balestier Khalsa	Our Tampines Hub
	Irfan Najeeb 49'			Referee: Muhammad Zulfiqar (Singapore)

13 May 2018 Round 8	Balestier Khalsa	1–2	(Brunei) DPMM FC	Toa Payoh Stadium
	Hazzuwan Halim 2'		Volodymyr Pryyomov 55'; Adi Said 64' (pen.)	Referee: G.Letchman (Singapore)

19 May 2018 Round 9	Balestier Khalsa	2–1	Home United	National Stadium, Singapore
	Vedran Mesec 87'; Huzaifah Aziz 90+1'		Hafiz Nor 9'; Anumanthan Kumar (red card) 90+5'	Referee: Muhammad Zulfiqar (Singapore)

27 May 2018 Round 10	Albirex Niigata (S) (Japan)	5–0	Balestier Khalsa	Jurong East Stadium
	Shuhei Hoshino 9'; Taku Morinaga 50', 71', 73'; Hiroyoshi Kamata 67'			Referee: Ahmad A'Qashah (Singapore)

2 June 2018 Round 11	Balestier Khalsa	1–2	Geylang International	Toa Payoh Stadium
	Huzaifah Aziz 30' (pen.) (yellow card) 70'; Nurullah Hussein (yellow card) 51'; Noor Akid Nordin (yellow card) 57'		Fairoz Hasan 1'; Yuki Ichikawa 74'; Jufri Taha (yellow card) 29'	Referee: Nathan Chan (Singapore)

10 June 2018 Round 12	Young Lions (Singapore)	0–2	Balestier Khalsa	Jalan Besar Stadium
			Huzaifah Aziz 43'; Akbar Shah 78'	Referee: G.Letchman (Singapore)

17 June 2018 Round 13	Balestier Khalsa	0–1	Hougang United	Toa Payoh Stadium
	Nurullah Hussein (yellow card) 58'; Sheikh Abdul Hadi (yellow card) 84'; Hazzuwan Halim (yellow card) 90+4'		Nurhilmi Jasni 73'; Illyas Lee (yellow card) 18'; Fabian Kwok (yellow card) 23' Justin Hui (yellow card) 82'; Khairulhin Khalid (yellow card) 90+4'; Jordan Vestering (yellow card) 90+4'

23 June 2018 Round 14	Warriors FC	3–0	Balestier Khalsa	Choa Chu Kang Stadium
	Ignatius Ang 20'; Jonathan Béhé 48' 90+1'

30 June 2018 Round 15	Balestier Khalsa	2–5	Tampines Rovers	Toa Payoh Stadium
	Hazzuwan Halim 21' (pen.); Akbar Shah 78'		Irfan Najeeb 9'; Khairul Amri 25', 70', 90+1'; Jordan Webb 90+3'

7 July 2018 Round 16	DPMM FC (Brunei)	2–2	Balestier Khalsa	Hassanal Bolkiah National Stadium
	Suhaimi Anak Sulau 5'; Shahrazen Said 23' (pen.)		Fadil Kamis 50'; Huzaifah Aziz 67'	Referee: Ahmad A'Qashah (Singapore)

15 July 2018 Round 17	Home United	1–1	Balestier Khalsa	Jalan Besar Stadium
	Shahril Ishak 42' (pen.)		Fadil Kamis 16'	Referee: G.Letchman (Singapore)

22 July 2018 Round 18	Balestier Khalsa	1–1	(Japan) Albirex Niigata (S)	Toa Payoh Stadium
	Kenya Takahashi 32'		Hazzuwan Halim 47'

1 August 2018 Round 19	Geylang International	1–0	Balestier Khalsa	Bedok Stadium
	Anders Aplin 73'		Dusan Marinkovic (yellow card) 82'

15 August 2018 Round 20	Hougang United	1–2	Balestier Khalsa	Hougang Stadium
	Antonie Viterale 26'		Zakir Samsudin 73'; Hazzuwan Halim 75'	Referee: Juherman Zaiton (Singapore)

19 August 2018 Round 21	Balestier Khalsa	2–2	Warriors FC	Toa Payoh Stadium
	Fadli Kamis 40'; Nurullah Hussein 76' (yellow card) 43'; Huzaifah Aziz (yellow card) 88'; Shaqi Sulaiman (yellow card) 94'		Jonathan Béhé 28' 71'; Firdaus Kasman (yellow card) 65'	Referee: Muhammad Zulfiqar (Singapore)

15 September 2018 Round 22 (Rescheduled)	Tampines Rovers	1–0	Balestier Khalsa	Our Tampines Hub
	Madhu Mohana 39'

12 August 2018 Round 23 (Rescheduled)	Balestier Khalsa	1–0	(Singapore) Young Lions	Toa Payoh Stadium
	Keegan Linderboom 37'

29 September 2018 Round 24 (Rescheduled)	Balestier Khalsa	0–0	(Brunei) DPMM FC	Toa Payoh Stadium
	Fadli Kamis (yellow card) 82'; Akbar Shah (yellow card) 82'		Azwan Saleh (yellow card) 82'

Pos	Team	Pld	W	D	L	GF	GA	GD	Pts	Qualification or relegation
4	Tampines Rovers	24	12	4	8	43	27	+16	40	Qualification to AFC Cup Group Stage
5	Warriors FC	24	7	7	10	32	35	−3	28	
6	Balestier Khalsa	24	7	6	11	25	36	−11	27	
7	Young Lions (Note: The two foreign clubs – Albirex Niigata (S) and DPMM FC – as well as the Football Association of Singapore (FAS) under-21 team, Young Lions, are ineligible for any AFC competition spots.)	24	5	6	13	25	46	−21	21	
8	Geylang International	24	5	5	14	26	57	−31	20	

Updated to match(es) played on 29 September 2018. Source: Singapore Premier League
Rules for classification: 1) points; 2) goal difference; 3) number of goals scored; 4) number of wins

=== Singapore Cup ===
Win Draw Loss

29 August 2018 Quarter Final; 1st Leg	Geylang International	0–0	Balestier Khalsa	Bedok Stadium
	Danish Irfan Azman (yellow card) 35'; Azhar Sairudin (yellow card) 48'; Afiq Yunos (yellow card) 50'		Noor Akid Nordin (yellow card) 27' (red card) 58'; Ahmad Syahir (yellow card) 42'	Referee: Nathan Chan (Singapore)

1 September 2018 Quarter Final; 2nd Leg	Balestier Khalsa	1–0 (1–0 agg.)	Geylang International	Toa Payoh Stadium
	Hazzuwan Halim 85' (pen.)			Referee: W. Ravisanthiran (Singapore)

Balestier Khalsa won 1–0 on aggregate.

26 September 2018 Semi Final; 1st Leg	DPMM FC (Brunei)	2–0	Balestier Khalsa	Jalan Besar Stadium
	Volodymyr Pryyomov 68' (pen.); Adi Said 70'		Shaqi Sulaiman (yellow card) 38'	Referee: Muhammad Farhan B Abd Rahman (Singapore)

3 October 2018 Semi Final; 2nd Leg	Balestier Khalsa	2–2 (2–4 agg.)	(Brunei) DPMM FC	Toa Payoh Stadium
	Hazzuwan Halim 37' (pen.); Huzaifah Aziz 41'; Ahmad Syahir (yellow card) 77'		Shahrazen Said 79'; Volodymyr Pryyomov 83'; Haimie Anak Nyaring (yellow card) 36'	Referee: Y.Sathyakumar (Singapore)

Balestier lost 2–4 on aggregate.

6 October 2018 3rd/4th Placing	Home United	2–2 (4–5 p)	Balestier Khalsa	Jalan Besar Stadium
	Faritz Hameed 74'; Isaka Cernak 92' (pen.); Faisal Roslan (yellow card) 56'; Izzdin Shafiq (yellow card) 34'; Shakir Hamzah (yellow card) 39'		Hazzuwan Halim 26' (pen.); Keegan Linderboom 37'; Fariz Faizal (yellow card) 68'	Referee: Jansen Foo (Singapore)
	Penalties
	Isaka Cernak (penalty scored); Faritz Hameed (penalty scored); Shakir Hamzah (penalty scored); Izzdin Shafiq (penalty scored); Fazli Ayob (penalty missed)		Shaqi Sulaiman (penalty scored); Sufianto Salleh (penalty scored); Nurullah Hussein (penalty scored); Huzaifah Aziz (penalty scored); Sanjin Vrebac (penalty scored)
