= 2019 Balestier Khalsa FC season =

Balestier Khalsa
2019 season
- Chairman: Darwin Jalil
- Head coach: Khidhir Khamis
- Stadium: Bishan Stadium
- Singapore Cup: –

The 2019 season was Balestier Khalsa's 24th consecutive season in the top flight of Singapore football and in the Singapore Premier League and the Singapore Cup.

== Squad ==
=== Sleague Squad ===
As of 21 September 2018.

Squad No.	Name	Date of birth (age)	Previous club
Goalkeepers
1	Naqiuddin Nodin	12 August 1994 (age 32)	
13	Zacharial Leong ^{U23}	6 April 1998 (age 28)	
19	Zaiful Nizam	24 July 1987 (age 39)	Gombak United
24	Faris Danial ^{U23}	23 May 1997 (age 29)	Geylang International
Defenders
2	Fadli Kamis	7 November 1992 (age 34)	Garena Young Lions
4	Khalili Khalif ^{U23}	3 January 1997 (age 29)	Home United
6	Nurullah Hussein	9 May 1993 (age 33)	Garena Young Lions
10	Sufianto Salleh	9 March 1993 (age 33)	Home United
15	Sheikh Abdul Hadi	24 March 1992 (age 34)	Garena Young Lions
18	Ahmad Syahir Sahimi	10 April 1992 (age 34)	
20	Ahmad Zaki ^{U23}	20 April 1997 (age 29)	Geylang International
21	Fazli Shafie ^{U23}	6 June 1997 (age 29)	Jungfrau Punggol FC
26	Illyas Lee	1 December 1995 (age 30)	Hougang United
Midfielders
5	Max Goh Yi Qi ^{U23}	6 March 1998 (age 28)	Project Vaults FC
7	Hazzuwan Halim	2 February 1994 (age 32)	
8	Raihan Rahman	7 February 1991 (age 35)	Hougang United
11	Huzaifah Aziz	24 June 1994 (age 32)	Hougang United
12	Jonathan Tan	13 December 1995 (age 30)	SAFSA
14	Afiq Salman Tan	28 November 1995 (age 30)	
16	Khairuddin Omar ^{U23}	8 March 1996 (age 30)	Home United
17	Fariz Faizal ^{U23}	17 October 1996 (age 30)	
25	(Croatia) Kristijan Krajcek	1 October 1993 (age 33)	(Croatia) NK BSK Bijelo Brdo
27	(Austria) Sanjin Vrebac ^{U19}	25 February 2000 (age 26)	(Germany) VfR Fischeln
	Jordan Chan ^{U23}	5 March 1998 (age 28)	Hougang United
Strikers
9	(Croatia) Sime Zuzul	10 January 1996 (age 30)	(Croatia) NK Hrvatski Dragovoljac
22	Daniel Goh ^{U23}	13 August 1999 (age 27)	Hougang United
23	Akbar Shah ^{U23}	29 May 1996 (age 30)	Home United
Player who left during season
3	Shaqi Sulaiman ^{U23}	10 November 1998 (age 28)	Hougang United

== Coaching staff ==
Position	Name
Head Coach	Khidhir Khamis
Assistant Coach	Haris Sumri
Assistant Coach	(Serbia) Sead Muratović
Goalkeeping Coach	Koh Chuan Hwee/ Rizal Abdul Rahman
Fitness Coach	Rosman Sulaiman
Team Chairman	Darwin Jalil
Physiotherapist	Mohamed Nasser
Kitman	Abdul Latiff

== Transfer ==
=== Pre-season transfer ===
==== In ====
Position	Player	Transferred From	Ref
Coach	(Singapore) Khidhir Khamis	Free Agent	
GK	(Singapore) Naqiuddin Nodin	Free Agent	
GK	(Singapore) Faris Danial	(Singapore) Geylang International	Free
DF	(Singapore) Illyas Lee	(Singapore) Hougang United	
DF	(Singapore) Ahmad Zaki	(Singapore) Geylang International	Free
DF	(Singapore) Fazli Shafie	(Singapore) Jungfrau Punggol FC	Free
MF	(Croatia) Kristijan Krajcek	(Croatia) NK BSK Bijelo Brdo	
MF	(Croatia) Šime Žužul	(Croatia) NK Hrvatski Dragovoljac	
MF	(Singapore) Max Goh	(Singapore) Project Vaults Oxley Sports Club	
MF	(Singapore) Jordan Chan	(Singapore) Hougang United	
FW	(Singapore) Daniel Goh	(Singapore) Hougang United	

==== Out ====
Position	Player	Transferred To	Ref
Coach	(Croatia) Marko Kraljević	(Malaysia) Kelantan FA	
GK	(Singapore) Nazri Sabri	(Singapore) Home United	
GK	(Singapore) Syahrul Nizam	(Singapore) Jungfrau Punggol FC	
DF	(Singapore) Nurisham Jupri	(Singapore) Project Vaults Oxley Sports Club	
DF	(Singapore) Zakir Samsudin		
DF	(Singapore) Sharin Majid		
MF	(Singapore) Noor Akid Nordin	(Singapore) Albirex Niigata (S)	Undisclosed
MF	(Croatia) Vedran Mesec	(Croatia) NK Sesvete (Tier 2)	
FW	(New Zealand) Keegan Linderboom	(New Zealand) Auckland City FC (Tier 1)	
FW	(Serbia) Dusan Marinkovic		

==== Extension ====
Position	Player	Ref
DF	Khalili Khalif	
DF	Sufianto Salleh	
DF	Ahmad Syahir Sahimi	

==== Retained ====
Position	Player	Ref
GK	Zacharial Leong	
GK	Zaiful Nizam	2 years contract signed in 2018
DF	Fadli Kamis	2 years contract signed in 2018
DF	Sheikh Abdul Hadi	2 years contract signed in 2018
DF	Sufianto Salleh	2 Years Contract signed in 2018
DF	Nurullah Hussein	2 Years Contract signed in 2018
DF	Shaqi Sulaiman	2 Years Contract signed in 2018
MF	Raihan Rahman	2 years contract signed in 2018
MF	Huzaifah Aziz	2 years contract signed in 2018
MF	Hazzuwan Halim	2 years contract signed in 2018
MF	Fariz Faizal	2 Years Contract signed in 2018
MF	Khairuddin Omar	2 Years Contract signed in 2018
MF	Noor Akid Nordin	2 Years Contract signed in 2018
MF	Afiq Salman Tan	2 Years Contract signed in 2018
FW	Akbar Shah	2 Years Contract signed in 2018
MF	(Austria) Sanjin Vrebac	

Note 1: Noor Akid Nordin moved to Albirex Niigata (S) despite signing a 2 years contract in 2018.

==== Promoted ====
Position	Player	Ref

=== Mid-season transfers ===
==== In ====
Position	Player	Transferred From	Ref
Coach	(Croatia) Marko Kraljević	(Malaysia) Kelantan FA	
MF	(Singapore) Jonathan Tan	(Singapore) SAFSA	loan return

==== Out ====
Position	Player	Transferred From	Ref
Coach	(Singapore) Khidhir Khamis	Sacked	
DF	(Singapore) Shaqi Sulaiman		NS till 2021

== Friendly ==
=== Pre-Season Friendly ===
Win Draw Loss

12 January 2019 1	Admiralty CSC (Singapore) (NFL)	1–5	(Singapore) Balestier Khalsa	Toa Payoh Stadium
5pm	89'		Akbar Shah 5', 18', 26'; Hazzuwan Halim 22'; Daniel Goh Ji Xiong 75'

19 January 2019 2	Yishun Sentek Mariners FC (Singapore) (NFL)	1–9	(Singapore) Balestier Khalsa	Toa Payoh Stadium
5pm	Azlan Razak 28'		Šime Žužul 11'; Kristijan Krajček 16', 18', 34', 67'; Hazzuwan Halim 20', 29', 37'; Fariz Faizal 80'

26 January 2019 3	Projects Vault Oxley FC (Singapore) (NFL)	0–4	(Singapore) Balestier Khalsa	Toa Payoh Stadium
5pm			Hazzuwan Halim 1'; Šime Žužul 17'; Kristijan Krajček 60' 76' (pen.)

9 February 2019 4	Balestier United (Singapore) (NFL)	0–9	(Singapore) Balestier Khalsa	Toa Payoh Stadium
5pm			Kristijan Krajček 14', 40', 67'; Illyas Lee 21'; Huzaifah Aziz 35'; Šime Žužul 39', 48'; Fariz Faizal 44'; Hazzuwan Halim 90' (pen.)

16 February 2019 5	Singapore Khalsa Association Football (NFL)	0–9	(Singapore) Balestier Khalsa	Toa Payoh Stadium
5pm			Sameer Alassane 42', 50'; Fariz Faizal 55'; Vrebac Sanjin 56', 75'; Afiq Tan 80'; Kristijan Krajček 83'

20 February 2019 6	Singapore U19	2–6	(Singapore) Balestier Khalsa	Jalan Besar Stadium
		Report	Huzaifah Aziz 7'; Hazzuwan Halim 8'; Šime Žužul 41', 47'; Akbar Shah 59', 62'

== Team statistics ==
=== Appearances and goals ===
As of 15 September 2018

Numbers in parentheses denote appearances as substitute.

No.	Pos.	Player	Sleague		Singapore Cup		Total	
No.	Pos.	Player	Apps.	Goals	Apps.	Goals	Apps.	Goals
1	GK	Naqiuddin Nodin	8	0	0	0	0	0
2	DF	Fadli Kamis	24	1	3	0	0	0
4	DF	Khalili Khalif	18(1)	0	2	0	0	0
5	MF	Max Goh Yi Qi	1	0	0	0	0	0
6	DF	Nurullah Hussein	16(1)	0	2(1)	0	0	0
7	MF	Hazzuwan Halim	16(2)	10	3	0	0	0
8	MF	Raihan Rahman	17(3)	1	1(1)	0	0	0
9	FW	(Croatia) Sime Zuzul	16(1)	9	2	1	0	0
10	DF	Sufianto Salleh	7(6)	0	2	0	0	0
11	MF	Huzaifah Aziz	18(3)	2	2(1)	0	0	0
12	MF	Jonathan Tan	1(2)	0	0(2)	0	0	0
13	GK	Zacharial Leong	6	0	2	0	0	0
14	MF	Afiq Salman Tan	0(1)	0	0	0	0	0
15	DF	Sheikh Abdul Hadi	9	0	3	0	0	0
16	MF	Khairuddin Omar	0(1)	0	0	0	0	0
17	MF	Fariz Faizal	9(5)	0	2	0	0	0
18	DF	Ahmad Syahir Sahimi	17(1)	0	1	0	0	0
19	GK	Zaiful Nizam	5	0	1	0	0	0
20	DF	Ahmad Zaki Bagharib	0(2)	0	0	0	0	0
21	DF	Fazli Shafie	6(1)	0	0	0	0	0
22	FW	Daniel Goh Ji Xiong	16(4)	2	2	0	0	0
23	FW	Akbar Shah	3(1)	0	0	0	0	0
24	GK	Faris Danial	3	0	0	0	0	0
25	MF	(Croatia) Kristijan Krajcek	15(2)	5	3	2	0	0
26	DF	Illyas Lee	10(5)	0	0	0	0	0
27	MF	(Austria) Sanjin Vrebac	11(10)	5	1(1)	0	0	0
44	MF	(Singapore) (Mali) Sameer Alassane	10(3)	1	1	0	0	0
62	FW	Suriya Ramesh	0(3)	0	0	0	0	0

== Competitions ==
=== Overview ===
Competition	Record							
Competition	P	W	D	L	GF	GA	GD	Win %
Singapore Premier League	24	4	5	15	37	58	−21	16.67
Singapore Cup	3	1	1	1	3	3	+0	33.33
Total	27	5	6	16	40	61	−21	18.52

=== Singapore Premier League ===
Win Draw Loss

2 March 2019 1	Young Lions FC (Singapore)	1–4	(Singapore) Balestier Khalsa	Jalan Besar Stadium
	Haiqal Pashia 32'		Sime Zuzul 10' 45'; Hazzuwan Halim 73'; Huzaifah Aziz 90'	Referee: Edwin Lee

9 March 2019 2	Balestier Khalsa (Singapore)	0–1	(Singapore) Hougang United	Bishan Stadium
	Kristijan Krajcek (yellow card) 42'; Huzaifah Aziz (yellow card) 45'; Illyas Lee (yellow card) 61'; Nurullah Hussein (yellow card) 78'		Faris Ramli 60'; Afiq Noor (yellow card) 18'	Referee: Ahmad A'Qashah

17 March 2019 3	Home United (Singapore)	0–0	(Singapore) Balestier Khalsa	Bishan Stadium
	Juma'at Jantan (yellow card) 26'		Raihan Rahman (yellow card) 53'; Huzaifah Aziz (yellow card) 55'	Referee: Y.Sathyakumar

31 March 2019 4	Balestier Khalsa (Singapore)	3–0	(Singapore) Geylang International	Bishan Stadium
	Darren Teh 59' (o.g.); Hazzuwan Halim 64'; Kristijan Krajcek 84'; Fadli Kamis (yellow card) 45'; Nurullah Hussein (yellow card) 45'; Daniel Goh Ji Xiong (yellow card) 59'		Barry Maguire (yellow card) 45'	Referee: Muhammad Taqi

6 April 2019 5	Albirex Niigata (S) (Singapore)	2–1	(Singapore) Balestier Khalsa	Jurong East Stadium
	Shoki Ohara 85'; Yoshikatsu Hiraga 90+2'; Daizo Horikoshi (yellow card) 71'; Kyoga Nakamura (yellow card) 72'		Huzaifah Aziz 4' (yellow card) 75'; Akbar Shah (yellow card) 22'; Fazli Shafie (yellow card) 25'; Raihan Rahman (yellow card) 68'	Referee: Ahmad A'Qashah

13 April 2019 6	Balestier Khalsa (Singapore)	1–7	Brunei DPMM	Bishan Stadium
	Sanjin Vrebac 79'; Daniel Goh Ji Xiong (yellow card) 53'; Illyas Lee (yellow card) 63'; Sufianto Salleh (yellow card) 70'		Andrei Varankou 14' 39' 59' 71' (pen.) 83'; Blake Ricciuto 27' 31' (yellow card) 84'; Abdul Azizi Ali Rahman (yellow card) 49'; Nur Ikhwan Othman (yellow card) 53'	Referee: Muhammad Taqi

21 April 2019 7	Balestier Khalsa (Singapore)	1–1	(Singapore) Tampines Rovers	Bishan Stadium
	Hazzuwan Halim 74'; Raihan Rahman (yellow card) 63'; Sufianto Salleh (yellow card) 81'; Daniel Goh Ji Xiong (yellow card) 89'		Zehrudin Mehmedović 76'; Shah Shahiran (yellow card) 66'; Shahdan Sulaiman (yellow card) 90+3'	Referee: G. Letchman

28 April 2019 8	Balestier Khalsa (Singapore)	2–1	(Singapore) Warriors FC	Bishan Stadium
	Hazzuwan Halim 46'; Sanjin Vrebac 60'; Nurullah Hussein (yellow card) 56'; Fazli Shafie (yellow card) 88'		Jonathan Béhé 77' (yellow card) 51'; Gabriel Quak (yellow card) 26'	Referee: Ahmad A'Qashah

3 May 2019 9	Balestier Khalsa (Singapore)	0–1	(Singapore) Young Lions FC	Bishan Stadium
	Sanjin Vrebac (yellow card) 1'; Raihan Rahman (yellow card) 3'; Sufianto Salleh (red card) 89'		Syukri Bashir 68'; Syed Akmal (yellow card) 83'	Referee: Lim Liang Yi

12 May 2019 10	Hougang United (Singapore)	1–0	(Singapore) Balestier Khalsa	Jalan Besar Stadium
	Faris Ramli (penalty missed) 45; Anumanthan Kumar 84' (yellow card) 74'; Jordan Nicolas Vestering (yellow card) 33'; Stipe Plazibat (yellow card) 49'; Muhaimin Suhaimi (yellow card) 63,81' (yellow-red card)		Huzaifah Aziz (yellow card) 19'; Nurullah Hussein (yellow card) 45'; Sime Zuzul (yellow card) 47'; Illyas Lee (yellow card) 50'	Referee: Muhammad Zulfiqar

26 May 2019 11	Balestier Khalsa (Singapore)	2–4	(Singapore) Home United	Bishan Stadium
	Sime Zuzul 42'; Sameer Alassane 45'; Raihan Rahman (yellow card) 44'; Nurullah Hussein (yellow card) 65'; Fadli Kamis (yellow card) 90'		Hafiz Nor 51' 79'; Song Ui-young 73'; Oliver Puflett 75'; Juma'at Jantan (yellow card) 65'	Referee: G. Letchman

16 June 2019 12	Geylang International (Singapore)	5–0	(Singapore) Balestier Khalsa	Our Tampines Hub
	Shawal Anuar 17' 45'; Barry Maguire 44' 48'; Yuki Ichikawa (yellow card) 76'; Umar Akhbar (yellow card) 54'			Referee: Nathan Chan

21 June 2019 13	Balestier Khalsa (Singapore)	1–3	(Singapore) Albirex Niigata (S)	Bishan Stadium
	Sime Zuzul 1'; Huzaifah Aziz (yellow card) 33'; Ahmad Syahir (yellow card) 45+2'; Raihan Rahman (yellow card) 58'; Nurullah Hussein (yellow card) 80'		Kaishu Yamazaki 75'; Noor Akid Nordin 78' (yellow card) 25'; Yosuke Nakagawa 90+4'	Referee: Juherman Zaiton

28 June 2019 14	Brunei DPMM	2–1	(Singapore) Balestier Khalsa	Hassanal Bolkiah National Stadium
	Abdul Azizi Ali Rahman 5'; Blake Ricciuto 52'		Sime Zuzul 47' (yellow card) 59'; Sufianto Salleh (yellow card) 11'; Ahmad Syahir Sahimi (yellow card) 39'	Referee: Lim Liang Yi

7 July 2019 15	Tampines Rovers (Singapore)	4–2	(Singapore) Balestier Khalsa	Our Tampines Hub
	Zehrudin Mehmedovic 15' 44'; Jordan Webb 17'; Ryutaro Megumi 31'		Raihan Rahman 47'; Sime Zuzul 87' (pen.)	Referee: Muhd Taqi

19 July 2019 16 (Rescheduled)	Warriors FC (Singapore)	3–3	(Singapore) Balestier Khalsa	Jurong East Stadium
	Jonathan Béhé 3'; Ignatius Ang 68'; Fairoz Hassan 75'		Sanjin Vrebac 5'; Sime Zuzul 40' 85' (penalty missed) 88	Referee: Syahir Ahmadi

28 July 2019 17	Young Lions FC (Singapore)	1–0	(Singapore) Balestier Khalsa	Jalan Besar Stadium
	Nur Luqman 28'; Sharul Nizam (yellow card) 33'		Huzaifah Aziz (yellow card) 60'	Referee: Muhammad Zulfiqar

4 August 2019 18	Balestier Khalsa (Singapore)	3–4	(Singapore) Hougang United	Bishan Stadium
	Fadli Kamis 14'; Hazzuwan Halim 36' 75'; Fariz Faizal (yellow card) 62'		Stipe Plazibat 43'; Shahfiq Ghani 58' 66'; Faris Ramli 78'; Afiq Yunos (yellow card) 84'	Referee: Abirami Naidu

14 August 2019 19	Home United (Singapore)	1–3	(Singapore) Balestier Khalsa	Bishan Stadium
	Faritz Abdul Hameed 70'		Kristijan Krajcek 14' 84'; Hazzuwan Halim 66'	Referee: Farhan Mohamed

18 August 2019 20	Balestier Khalsa (Singapore)	3–4	(Singapore) Geylang International	Bishan Stadium
	Daniel Goh 65', 72'; Sime Zuzul 75'		Christopher Van Huizen 7'; Shawal Anuar 57'; Fareez Farhan 90+1'; Amy Recha 90+4'	Referee: Syarqawi Buhari

18 September 2019 21 (Rescheduled)	Albirex Niigata (S) (Singapore)	2–0	(Singapore) Balestier Khalsa	Jurong East Stadium
	Hiroyoshi Kamata 19' (pen.); Kyoga Nakamura 90+3'

1 September 2019 22	Balestier Khalsa (Singapore)	1–4	Brunei DPMM	Bishan Stadium
	Hazzuwan Halim 44'		Charlie Clough 3'; Andrei Varankou 13' 90+1'; Azizi 69'	Referee: Lim Liang Yi

14 September 2019 23	Tampines Rovers (Singapore)	3–3	(Singapore) Balestier Khalsa	Our Tampines Hub
	Taufik Suparno 6'; Yasir Hanapi 31'; Jordan Webb 91'		Hazzuwan Halim 21'; Sanjin Vrebac 29'; Kristijan Krajcek 81'	Referee: Farhan Mohamed

29 September 2019 24 (Rescheduled)	Balestier Khalsa (Singapore)	3–3	(Singapore) Warriors FC	Bishan Stadium
	Sanjin Vrebac 67'; Hazzuwan Halim 81' (pen.); Kristijan Krajcek 86'		Zulkiffli Hassim 41' 45'; Faizal Raffi 73'	Referee: Syahir Ahmadi

Pos	Team	Pld	W	D	L	GF	GA	GD	Pts
5	Geylang International	24	10	3	11	41	48	−7	33
6	Home United	24	9	3	12	34	46	−12	30
7	Warriors	24	6	5	13	40	56	−16	23
8	Young Lions (Note: The two foreign clubs – Albirex Niigata (S) and DPMM – as well as the Football Association of Singapore (FAS) under-21 team, Young Lions, are ineligible for any AFC competition spots.)	24	6	4	14	21	38	−17	22
9	Balestier Khalsa	24	4	5	15	37	58	−21	17

Source: Singapore Premier League
Rules for classification: 1) points; 2) goal difference; 3) number of goals scored; 4) number of wins

=== Singapore Cup ===
Win Draw Loss

25 September 2019 Match 1	Home United (Singapore)	1–3	(Singapore) Balestier Khalsa	Bishan Stadium
	Song Ui-young 45' (pen.)		Sime Zuzul 35'; Kristijan Krajcek 52' 60'	Referee: Muhammad Zulfiqar

19 October 2019 Match 2	Balestier Khalsa (Singapore)	0–2	(Singapore) Tampines Rovers	Bishan Stadium
			Jordan Webb 59'; Ryutaro Megumi 79'	Referee: Muhd Taqi

23 October 2019 Match 3	Balestier Khalsa (Singapore)	0–0	(Singapore) Warriors FC	Bishan Stadium
				Referee: Farhan Mohamad
