= 2017 Balestier Khalsa season =

Balestier Khalsa
2017 season
- Chairman: Thavaneson
- Head coach: Marko Kraljević
- Stadium: Toa Payoh Stadium
- S.League: 7th
- Singapore Cup: Preliminary Round
- League Cup: Group Stage
- Top goalscorer: League: Hazzuwan Halim (5 goals); All: Hazzuwan Halim (8 goals)

The 2017 season was Balestier Khalsa's 22nd consecutive season in the top flight of Singapore football and in the S.League. Along with the S.League, the club also competed in the Prime League, the Singapore Cup and the Singapore League Cup.

== Squad ==
=== S.League squad ===
As of 20 February 2017.

Squad No.	Name	Date of birth (age)	Previous club
Goalkeepers
1	A. Renonathan		Singapore Cricket Club
16	Naqiuddin Nodin	12 August 1994 (age 32)	
19	Zaiful Nizam	24 July 1987 (age 39)	
22	Hamzah Fazil	6 September 1995 (age 31)	Singapore Cubs
Defenders
2	Fadli Kamis	7 November 1992 (age 34)	
3	Hanafi Salleh	10 September 1989 (age 37)	
4	Ashrul Syafeeq	11 April 1994 (age 32)	(Singapore) Young Lions
6	Tajeli Salamat	7 February 1994 (age 32)	(Singapore) Young Lions
12	Sheikh Abdul Hadi	24 March 1992 (age 34)	
13	Zulkhair Mustaffa	23 December 1997 (age 28)	Youth Team
14	Azmeerudin Jamludain		Tampines Rovers
18	Ahmad Syahir	10 April 1992 (age 34)	
Midfielders
5	Shah Hirul	7 May 1986 (age 40)	
7	(Myanmar) Aung Kyaw Naing	20 December 1994 (age 31)	(Myanmar) Nay Pyi Taw
8	Raihan Rahman	7 February 1991 (age 35)	Hougang United
9	(Myanmar) Kyaw Zayar Win	2 May 1991 (age 35)	(Myanmar) Ayeyawady United
10	(Myanmar) Nanda Lin Kyaw Chit	21 June 1991 (age 35)	(Myanmar) Yadanarbon FC
11	Huzaifah Aziz	27 June 1994 (age 32)	Hougang United
20	Jonathan Tan	13 December 1995 (age 30)	(Singapore) Young Lions
23	Hanafi Akbar	7 February 1995 (age 31)	
24	Hazzuwan Halim	2 February 1994 (age 32)	
Strikers
21	Danial Tan	4 August 1994 (age 32)	

== Coaching staff ==
Position	Name
Head coach	(Croatia) Marko Kraljević
Assistant coach	D. Tokijan
Goalkeeping coach	Rizal Abdul Rahman
Fitness coach	Rosman Sulaiman
Team Chairman	Thavaneson Selvaratnam
Physiotherapist	Mohamed Nasser
Kitman	Abdul Latiff

== Transfer ==
=== Pre-season transfers ===
==== In ====
Position	Player	Transferred From	Ref
GK	A. Renonathan	Promoted	
DF	Zulkhair Mustaffa	Promoted	
DF	Syahfuddin Eska	Promoted	
DF	Ashrul Syafeeq	(Singapore) Young Lions	
DF	Tajeli Salamat	(Singapore) Young Lions	
MF	Huzaifa Aziz	Hougang United	Free
MF	Raihan Rahman	Hougang United	Free
MF	Jonathan Tan	(Singapore) Young Lions	
MF	(Myanmar) Kyaw Zayar Win	(Myanmar) Ayeyawady United	
MF	(Myanmar) Nanda Lin Kyaw Chit	(Myanmar) Yadanarbon FC	
MF	(Myanmar) Aung Kyaw Naing	(Myanmar) Nay Pyi Taw	
MF	Hanafi Akbar	Free Agent	
GK	Hamzah Fazil	Free Agent	

==== Out ====
Position	Player	Transferred To	Ref
GK	Daniel Ong	Balestier United Recreation Club	
GK	Ameerul Shafiq	Admiralty FC	
DF	Ho Wai Loon	Warriors FC	
DF	Nurullah Hussein	Released	National Service
DF	Gary Loo	Tiong Bahru FC	Free
DF	(Serbia) Emir Lotinac	(Serbia) FK Vojvodina	
MF	Fadhil Noh	Warriors FC	
MF	Jamil Ali	Tampines Rovers	
MF	Fazli Ayob	Tampines Rovers	
MF	(Serbia) Sadin Smajović	(Serbia) FK Jošanica	
MF	Danial Mazlan	Released	
FW	(Croatia) Niko Tokić	(Croatia) NK Zagreb	
FW	(Croatia) Miroslav Krištić	(Croatia) NK Imotski	
FW	Zulkiffli Hassim	Yishun Sentek Mariners	
FW	Syafiq Zainal	Balestier United Recreation Club	

=== Mid-season transfers ===
==== In ====
Position	Player	Transferred From	Ref
DF	Azmeerudin Jamludain	Free Agent	
MF	Mahathir Azeman	Home United	Return to Parent Club After National Service

==== Out ====
Position	Player	Transferred To	Ref
DF	Syahfuddin Eska		

== Friendlies ==
=== Pre-season friendlies ===
Win Draw Loss

11 February 2017 Pre-season	Young Lions (Singapore)	2–0	Balestier Khalsa	Toa Payoh Stadium

15 February 2017 Pre-season	Albirex Niigata (S) (Japan)	1–0	Balestier Khalsa	Toa Payoh Stadium
	Ryota Nakai 28'	Report	Sheikh Abdul Hadi (red card) 0'; Marko Kraljević (red card) 0'

=== In Season Friendlies ===
12 May 2017 Friendly	Albirex Niigata (S) (Japan)	0–0	(Singapore) Balestier Khalsa	Jurong East Stadium

9 June 2017	Balestier Khalsa	4–0	Singapore U20	ITE College Central
	Raihan Rahman 6'; Kyaw Zayar Win 17'; Aung Kyaw Naing 29'; Tajeli Salamat 58'

== Team statistics ==
=== Appearances and goals ===
Numbers in parentheses denote appearances as substitute.

No.	Pos.	Player	Sleague		Singapore Cup		League Cup		Total	
No.	Pos.	Player	Apps.	Goals	Apps.	Goals	Apps.	Goals	Apps.	Goals
1	GK	A. Renonathan	0	0	0	0	0	0	0	0
2	DF	Fadli Kamis	22(1)	3	1	0	2	1	25(1)	4
3	DF	Hanafi Salleh	14(3)	0	0	0	2(1)	0	16(4)	0
4	DF	Ashrul Syafeeq	13	0	1	0	2(1)	0	16(1)	0
5	MF	Shah Hirul	11(4)	0	0	0	2	0	13(4)	0
6	DF	Tajeli Salamat	17(3)	1	0(1)	0	2(1)	0	19(5)	1
7	MF	(Myanmar) Aung Kyaw Naing	19(3)	2	1	0	2(1)	1	22(4)	3
8	MF	Raihan Rahman	20(1)	4	1	1	2(1)	1	23(2)	6
9	MF	(Myanmar) Kyaw Zayar Win	16(2)	0	1	0	2	0	19(2)	0
10	MF	(Myanmar) Nanda Lin Kyaw Chit	15(5)	0	0(1)	0	1	0	16(6)	0
11	MF	Huzaifah Aziz	17(3)	2	1	0	2(1)	0	20(4)	2
12	DF	Sheikh Abdul Hadi	19(1)	0	1	0	2	0	22(1)	0
13	DF	Zulkhair Mustaffa	4(3)	0	0	0	1(1)	0	5(4)	0
14	DF	Azmeerudin Jamludain	0(1)	0	0	0	0	0	0(1)	0
16	GK	Naqiuddin Nodin	0	0	0	0	0	0	0	0
18	DF	Ahmad Syahir	19(1)	0	1	0	3	0	23(1)	0
19	GK	Zaiful Nizam (captain)	24	0	1	0	3	0	28	0
20	MF	Jonathan Tan	8(8)	0	1	0	2	0	11(8)	0
21	FW	Danial Tan	0(2)	0	0	0	0	0	0(2)	0
22	GK	Hamzah Fazil	0	0	0	0	0	0	0	0
23	MF	Hanafi Akbar	4(7)	0	0	0	0	0	4(7)	0
24	MF	Hazzuwan Halim	22(2)	5	1	2	2(1)	1	25(3)	8
30	DF	Rafiqin Kamal	0(2)	0	0	0	0	0	0(2)	0
38	MF	Fariz Faizal	0(7)	0	0	0	0	0	0(7)	0
43	MF	Khairuddin Omar	0(3)	0	0	0	0	0	0(3)	0
Players who have played this season but had left the club or on loan to other club
14	DF	Syahfuddin Eska	0	0	0	0	0	0	0	0

== Competitions ==
=== Overview ===
Competition	Record							
Competition	P	W	D	L	GF	GA	GD	Win %
S.League	24	5	4	15	17	33	−16	20.83
Singapore Cup	1	0	0	1	3	4	−1	0.00
League Cup	3	1	0	2	3	5	−2	33.33
Total	28	6	4	18	23	42	−19	21.43

=== S.League ===
Win Draw Loss

28 February 2017 Round 1	Balestier Khalsa	1–2	Warriors FC	Toa Payoh Stadium
	Raihan Rahman 27' (pen.); Fadli Kamis (yellow card) 24'; Hanafi Salleh (yellow card) 57'; Huzaifa Aziz (yellow card) 61'; Raihan Rahman (yellow card) 77'		Jordan Webb 49' (pen.); Shaiful Esah 88' (yellow card) 26'; Ridhuan Muhamad (yellow card) 23'; Hafiz Osman (yellow card) 34'	Attendance: 1,975; Referee: G Letchman

4 March 2017 Round 2	Geylang International	2–0	Balestier Khalsa	Bedok Stadium
	Al-Qaasimy Rahman 26'; Fadli Kamis 59' (o.g.); Safirul Sulaiman (yellow card) 15'; Víctor Coto Ortega (yellow card) 18'; Shahfiq Ghani (yellow card) 85'		Nanda Lin Kyaw Chit (yellow card) 80'	Referee: Ahmad A'Qashah

11 March 2017 Round 3	Balestier Khalsa	0–1	Tampines Rovers	Toa Payoh Stadium
	Fadli Kamis (yellow card) 46'; Aung Kyaw Naing (yellow card) 48'; Sheikh Abdul Hadi (red card) 90'		Ivan Džoni 50' (yellow card) 81' (penalty missed) 75; Son Yong Chan (yellow card) 40'; Jamil Ali (yellow card) 75' (red card) 90'	Attendance: 950; Referee: Nathan Chan

2 April 2017 Round 4	Balestier Khalsa	1–0	(Singapore) Young Lions	Toa Payoh Stadium
	Aung Kyaw Naing 52'; Ahmad Syahir (yellow card) 25'; Nanda Lin Kyaw Chit (yellow card) 28'		Amirul Adli (yellow card) 69'; Shahrin Saberin (yellow card) 90'	Attendance: 868; Referee: Farhad Mohamed

7 April 2017 Round 5	Balestier Khalsa	2–1	(Brunei) DPMM FC	Jalan Besar Stadium
	Hazzuwan Halim 56'; Raihan Rahman 60'; Ashrul Syafeeq (yellow card) 20'; Aung Kyaw Naing (yellow card) 45'; Ahmad Syahir (yellow card) 82'; Zaiful Nizam (yellow card) 90'		Rafael Ramazotti 21' (pen.); Azwan Saleh (yellow card) 45,86' (yellow-red card)	Attendance: 788; Referee: Ahmad A'Qashah

2 May 2017 Round 6 (Rescheduled)	Home United	1–0	Balestier Khalsa	Bishan Stadium
	Irfan Fandi 27'; Marijan Šuto (yellow card) 34'; Abdil Qaiyyim (yellow card) 41'; Sufianto Salleh (yellow card) 54'		Kyaw Zayar Win (yellow card) 40'; Ahmad Syahir (yellow card) 45'	Attendance: 1,050; Referee: Muhd Taqi

21 April 2017 Round 7	Balestier Khalsa	0–3	(Japan) Albirex Niigata (S)	Jalan Besar Stadium
	Raihan Rahman (yellow card) 42'; Shah Hirul (yellow card) 45'		Hiroyoshi Kamata 23'; Tsubasa Sano 64'; Ryota Nakai 70'	Attendance: 802; Referee: Muhd Taqi

27 April 2017 Round 8	Hougang United	1–0	Balestier Khalsa	Hougang Stadium
	Nurhilmi Jasni 39'; Ali Hudzaifi (yellow card) 90'; Lionel Tan (yellow card) 90'		Raihan Rahman (yellow card) 17'; Ahmad Syahir (yellow card) 71'	Attendance: 853; Referee: W Ravisanthiran

19 May 2017 Round 9	Warriors FC	1–0	Balestier Khalsa	Jalan Besar Stadium
	Joël Tshibamba 9'; Firdaus Kasman (yellow card) 39'; Syaqir Sulaiman (yellow card) 54'; Zulfadli Zainal Abidin (yellow card) 59'; Fadhil Noh (yellow card) 84'		Sheikh Abdul Hadi (red card) 39'; Huzaifah Aziz (yellow card) 57' (yellow card) 57' (yellow-red card)	Attendance: 1,648; Referee: Ahmad A'Qashah

26 May 2017 Round 10	Balestier Khalsa	0–1	Geylang International	Jalan Besar Stadium
	Fadli Kamis (yellow card) 87'		Ricardo Sendra 40'	Referee: G Letchman

17 June 2017 Round 11	Tampines Rovers	3–1	Balestier Khalsa	Jurong West Stadium
	Fazli Ayob 38' (yellow card) 29'; Ryutaro Megumi 41'; Ivan Džoni 49'		Fadli Kamis 82'; Raihan Rahman (yellow card) 46'; Huzaifah Aziz (yellow card) 57'	Attendance: 986; Referee: Jansen Foo

22 June 2017 Round 12 (Rescheduled)	Young Lions (Singapore)	0–0	Balestier Khalsa	Jalan Besar Stadium
	Muhelmy Suhaimi (yellow card) 64'; Hami Syahin (yellow card) 71'		Hanafi Salleh (yellow card) 35'; Tajeli Salamat (yellow card) 43' (yellow card) 61' (yellow-red card)	Attendance: 1,053; Referee: Nathan Chan

21 August 2017 Round 13 (Rescheduled)	Balestier Khalsa	2–2	(Brunei) DPMM FC	Toa Payoh Stadium
	Huzaifah Aziz 7' (yellow card) 86'; Raihan Rahman 60'; Fadli Kamis (yellow card) 22'; Sheikh Abdul Hadi (yellow card) 49'; Jonathan Tan (yellow card) 75'		Rafael Ramazotti 70', 82'; Hazwan Hamzah (yellow card) 21'; Haizul Rani (yellow card) 58'	Attendance: 805; Referee: Farhad Mohamed

3 July 2017 Round 14	Balestier Khalsa	1–2	Home United	Toa Payoh Stadium
	Raihan Rahman 51' (pen.); Ahmad Syahir (yellow card) 38'; Nanda Linn Kyaw Chit (yellow card) 59'; Jonathan Tan (yellow card) 67'; Shah Hirul (yellow card) 68'; Zaiful Nizam (yellow card) 77'; Hanafi Salleh (red card) 84'; Kyaw Zayar Win (red card) 90'		Khairul Nizam 79'; Stipe Plazibat 85' (pen.); Amiruldin Asraf (yellow card) 25'; Irfan Fandi (yellow card) 46'; Sirina Camara (yellow card) 66' (yellow card) 66' (yellow-red card)	Referee: Farhad Mohamed

26 July 2017 Round 15	Albirex Niigata (S) (Japan)	2–1	Balestier Khalsa	Jurong East Stadium
	Tsubasa Sano 59'; Kento Nagasaki 68'; Shuto Inaba (yellow card) 53'		Aung Kyaw Naing 89'; Huzaifah Aziz (yellow card) 49'	Attendance: 1,849; Referee: Ahmad A'Qashah

29 July 2017 Round 16	Balestier Khalsa	0–0	Hougang United	Toa Payoh Stadium
	Raihan Rahman (yellow card) 90'		Syahiran Miswan (yellow card) 36'; Delwinder Singh (yellow card) 90'; Pablo Rodríguez (yellow card) 90'; Nazrul Nazari (red card) 53'	Attendance: 966; Referee: Jansen Foo

17 August 2017 Round 17	Balestier Khalsa	2–2	Warriors FC	Toa Payoh Stadium
	Hazzuwan Halim 8'; Fadli Kamis 58'; Zulkhair Mustaffa (yellow card) 35'		Andrei-Cosmin Ciolacu 43' (pen.); Hafiz Nor 56'	Attendance: 836; Referee: Muhd Syahir

9 September 2017 Round 18	Geylang International	2–0	Balestier Khalsa	Jalan Besar Stadium
	Gabriel Quak 27' (yellow card) 78'; Shawal Anuar 48'; Nor Azli Yusoff (yellow card) 17'; Faritz Hameed (yellow card) 71'		Huzaifah Aziz (yellow card) 79'; Ahmad Syahir (yellow card) 84'	Attendance: 1,350; Referee: W Ravisanthiran

17 September 2017 Round 19	Balestier Khalsa	0–1	Tampines Rovers	Toa Payoh Stadium
			Fazrul Nawaz 53'	Attendance: 864; Referee: Muhd Syahir

20 September 2017 Round 20	Young Lions (Singapore)	0–1	Balestier Khalsa	Jalan Besar Stadium
			Huzaifah Aziz 66'; Tajeli Salamat (yellow card) 55'; Ahmad Syahir (yellow card) 71'; Raihan Rahman (penalty missed) 3 (yellow card) 82'; Aung Kyaw Naing (yellow card) 85'; Hanafi Akbar (yellow card) 90'	Attendance: 1,136; Referee: G Letchman

16 October 2017 Round 21 (Rescheduled)	DPMM FC (Brunei)	1–4	Balestier Khalsa	Hassanal Bolkiah National Stadium
	Shahrazen Said 90'; Daud Jared Alvarez (yellow card) 58'		Fadli Kamis 21'; Hazzuwan Halim 48' 72' (pen.) (yellow card) 69'; Tajeli Salamat 88'; Nanda Linn Kyaw Chit (yellow card) 62'	Referee: Sukhbir Singh

20 October 2017 Round 22	Home United	2–0	Balestier Khalsa	Jalan Besar Stadium
	Stipe Plazibat 24', 26'		Raihan Rahman (yellow card) 47'; Tajeli Salamat (yellow card) 63'; Fariz Faizal (yellow card) 69'	Referee: Farhad Mohamed

26 October 2017 Round 23	Balestier Khalsa	0–3	(Japan) Albirex Niigata (S)	Toa Payoh Stadium
			Tsubasa Sano 13'; Hiroyoshi Kamata 39'; Ryota Nakai 89'; Shuto Inaba (yellow card) 41'	Referee: Muhd Syahir

2 November 2017 Round 24	Hougang United	0–1	Balestier Khalsa	Hougang Stadium
	Syahiran Miswan (yellow card) 38'; Iqbal Hamid Hussain (yellow card) 45'		Hazzuwan Halim 59' (pen.); Raihan Rahman (yellow card) 87'	Referee: W Ravisanthiran

Pos	Team	Pld	W	D	L	GF	GA	GD	Pts
5	Warriors FC	24	9	7	8	33	36	−3	34
6	Hougang United	24	9	3	12	24	31	−7	30
7	Balestier Khalsa	24	5	4	15	17	33	−16	19
8	(Brunei) DPMM FC (Note: The two foreign clubs – Albirex Niigata (S) and DPMM FC – as well as the Football Association of Singapore (FAS) under-21 team, Young Lions, are not eligible for any AFC competition spots.)	24	5	2	17	30	61	−31	17
9	(Singapore) Young Lions	24	1	3	20	10	62	−52	6

Source: S.League
Rules for classification: 1) points; 2) goal difference; 3) number of goals scored; 4) number of wins

=== Singapore Cup ===
Win Draw Loss

1 June 2017 (Rescheduled) Preliminary Round	Balestier Khalsa	3–4	(Cambodia) Nagaworld FC	Toa Payoh Stadium
	Halim Hazzuwan 25', 69'; Raihan Rahman 56' (pen.); Huzaifah Aziz (yellow card) 44'; Tajeli Salamat (yellow card) 84'		Atuheire Kipson 14'; George Kelechi 23', 59'; Sos Suhana 42'; Khim Borey (yellow card) 81'	Referee: G Letchman

=== Singapore TNP League Cup ===
Pos	Team	Pld	W	D	L	GF	GA	GD	Pts	Qualification
1	(Brunei) DPMM FC	3	2	1	0	11	4	+7	7	Advance to semi-final
2	Geylang International	3	2	1	0	9	4	+5	7	Advance to semi-final
3	Balestier Khalsa	3	1	0	2	3	5	−2	3	
4	Tampines Rovers	3	0	0	3	2	12	−10	0	

Source: S.League

Win Draw Loss

8 July 2017 Group Stage M1	Balestier Khalsa	0–2	Geylang International	Toa Payoh Stadium
	Sheikh Abdul Hadi (yellow card) 72'		Amy Recha 31'; Ricardo Sendra 50'; Nor Azli (yellow card) 53'	Referee: Muhd Syahir

11 July 2017 Group Stage M2	DPMM FC (Brunei)	3–0	Balestier Khalsa	Jalan Besar Stadium
	Azwan Ali 7'; Ashrul Syafeeq 42' (o.g.); Adi Said 70'; Nurikhwan Othman (yellow card) 30'; Vincent Salas (yellow card) 36'; Azwan Saleh (yellow card) 63'		Huzaifah Aziz (yellow card) 5'; Fadli Kamis (yellow card) 82'	Referee: G Letchman

14 July 2017 Group Stage M3	Balestier Khalsa	3–0	Tampines Rovers	Toa Payoh Stadium
	Fadli Kamis 30'; Hazzuwan Halim 56'; Aung Kyaw Naing 86'		Jufri Taha (yellow card) 66'; Jamli Ali (yellow card) 70'; Ehvin Sasidharan (yellow card) 88'	Referee: W Ravisanthiran
