= 2019 Home United FC season =

Home United
2019 season
- Chairman: Anselm Lopez
- Head coach: Noh Rahman
- Stadium: Bishan Stadium
Home colours	Away colours

The 2019 season was Home United's 24th consecutive season in the top flight of Singapore football and in the Singapore Premier League. Along with the Singapore Premier League, the club also competed in the Singapore Cup.

== Key events ==
=== Pre-season ===
1. On 26/9/2018, it was reported that Geylang International is interested in bringing Song Ui-young to Bedok Stadium together with their former coach, Lee Lim Saeng for Season 2019. Joining the Eagles to express interest is Indonesian giants Persija Jakarta.
2. On 26/9/2018, it was reported that Aidil Shahril is courted by Perak FA for 2019 while their former coach Lee Lim Saeng is also a target for Warriors FC.
3. On 5/10/2018, it was reported that Aidil Shahril is courted by Kedah FA of Malaysia, Ceres–Negros of Philippines, Ports FC of Thailand and Persija Jakarta of Indonesia.
4. On 8/10/2018, Shakir Hamzah was banned for 4 AFC Cup matches by AFC.com for using offensive, insulting or abusive language and/or gestures towards the match Official after being sentoff in the match against 4.25. He is also fined US$5000.
5. On 9/10/2018, it was confirmed that Aidil Sharin had left Home United to take top role at Kedah FA.
6. On 30/10/2018, Shahrin Saberin officially leave Home United after his contract ended to join the Eagles for 2019. He is followed by Amy Recha.
7. On 31/10/2018, Song Ui-young says no to US$20,000 a month offer from Persija Jakarta to stay with the team.
8. On 9/11/2018, Shakir Hamzah was reported to have been offered a one-year offer from former Malaysia Cup champions Kedah FA

=== In-season ===
1. On 19/4/2019, newly appointed coach, Saswadimata Dasuki leaves the club after a dismal start to the season. Assistant coach Noh Rahman takes over as interim head coach.
2. On 2/7/2019, former national football coach Raddy Avramovic returns to Singapore as the head coach of Home United.
3. On 17/8/2019, Raddy Avramovic steps down as head coach of Home United Football Club for health reasons. Assistant coach Noh Rahman reprises his role as interim head coach

== Squad ==
=== S.League squad ===
As of 1 February 2019

Squad No.	Name	Nationality	Date of birth (age)	Previous club	Contract since	Contract end
Goalkeepers
1	Nazri Sabri	(Singapore)	20 September 1989 (age 37)	(Singapore) Balestier Khalsa	2019	2019
18	Haikal Hasnol	(Singapore)	4 November 1995 (age 30)	(Singapore) Tampines Rovers	2019	2019
24	Rudy Khairullah	(Singapore)	19 July 1994 (age 32)	(Singapore) Police SA (NFL D1)	2017	2019
Defenders
4	Juma'at Jantan ^{>30}	(Singapore)	23 February 1984 (age 42)	(Singapore) LionsXII	2013	2019
6	Abdil Qaiyyim Mutalib	(Singapore)	14 May 1989 (age 37)	(Singapore) Tampines Rovers	2015	2019
7	Aqhari Abdullah	(Singapore)	9 July 1991 (age 35)	(Singapore) LionsXII	2016	2019
9	Faritz Abdul Hameed	(Singapore)	16 January 1990 (age 36)	(Singapore) Geylang International	2018	2019
15	Faizal Roslan	(Singapore)	30 May 1995 (age 31)	(Singapore) Young Lions FC	2018	2019
21	Taufiq Muqminin ^{U23}	(Singapore)	26 July 1996 (age 30)	(Singapore) Young Lions FC	2019	2019
22	Ho Wai Loon	(Singapore)	20 August 1993 (age 33)	(Singapore) Warriors FC	2019	2019
Midfielders
8	Isaka Cernak	(Australia)	9 April 1989 (age 37)	(Thailand) Sisaket	2018	2019
10	Song Ui-young	(South Korea)	8 November 1993 (age 32)	Youth Team	2012	2020
11	Hafiz Nor ^{>30}	(Singapore)	22 August 1988 (age 38)	(Singapore) Warriors FC	2018	2019
13	Izzdin Shafiq (Captain)	(Singapore)	14 December 1990 (age 35)	(Singapore) Tampines Rovers	2017	2019
14	Fazli Ayob	(Singapore)	24 January 1990 (age 36)	(Singapore) Tampines Rovers	2018	2019
16	Hami Syahin ^{U23}	(Singapore)	16 December 1998 (age 27)	(Singapore) Young Lions FC	2019	2019
20	Arshad Shamim ^{U23}	(Singapore)	9 December 1999 (age 26)	Youth Team	2018	2019
25	Suhairi Sabri ^{U23}	(Singapore)	23 April 1996 (age 30)	Youth Team	2018	2019
27	Adam Swandi ^{U23}	(Singapore)	12 January 1996 (age 30)	(Singapore) Albirex Niigata (S)	2019	2019
28	Muhelmy Suhaimi ^{U23}	(Singapore)	22 January 1996 (age 30)	(Singapore) Young Lions FC	2018	2019
Strikers
12	Iqram Rifqi ^{U23}	(Singapore)	25 February 1996 (age 30)	Youth Team	2017	2019
17	Shahril Ishak ^{>30}	(Singapore)	23 January 1984 (age 42)	(Singapore) Warriors FC	2018	2019
19	Nur Hizami Salim	(Singapore)	11 April 1994 (age 32)	(Singapore) SAFSA (NFL D1)	2019	2019
23	Amiruldin Asraf ^{U23}	(Singapore)	8 January 1997 (age 29)	Youth Team	2017	2019
26	Oliver Puflett ^{U21}	(Australia)	26 July 1999 (age 27)	(Australia) Western Sydney Wanderers FC	2019	2019

== Coaching staff ==
Source
Position	Name	Ref.
Head coach	(Singapore)	
Assistant coach	(Singapore) Noh Rahman	
Assistant coach	(Singapore) Syed Karim	
Goalkeeping Coach	(Singapore) Adi Saleh	
General Manager	(Singapore) Badri Ghent	
Team manager		
Physiotherapist	(Singapore) Daisy Sumampong Anarna	
Kitman		

== Transfer ==
=== Pre-season transfer ===
==== In ====
Position	Player	Transferred From	Ref
Coach	(Singapore) Saswadimata Dasuki	Promoted	
GK	(Singapore) Nazri Sabri	(Singapore) Balestier Khalsa	
GK	(Singapore) Haikal Hasnol	(Singapore) Tampines Rovers	Season loan (NS)
DF	(Singapore) Ho Wai Loon	(Singapore) Warriors FC	
DF	(Singapore) Taufiq Muqminin	(Singapore) Young Lions FC	
MF	(Singapore) Hami Syahin	(Singapore) Young Lions FC	
MF	(Singapore) Adam Swandi	(Singapore) Albirex Niigata (S)	
FW	(Singapore) Nur Hizami Salim	(Singapore) SAFSA	Return from loan
FW	(Australia) Oliver Puflett	(Australia) Western Sydney Wanderers FC Reserves	

==== Out ====
Position	Player	Transferred To	Ref
Coach	(Singapore) Aidil Shahril	(Malaysia) Kedah FA	
GK	(Singapore) Eko Pradana Putra		
GK	(Singapore) Kenji Syed Rusydi	(Singapore) Garena Young Lions	
DF	(Singapore) Shakir Hamzah	(Malaysia) Kedah FA	
DF	(Singapore) Shahrin Saberin	(Singapore) Geylang International	
DF	(France) Sirina Camara		
DF	(Singapore) Ribiyanda Saswadimata	(Singapore) Yishun Sentek Mariners FC (NFL D1)	
MF	(Singapore) Anumanthan Kumar	(Singapore) Hougang United	
MF	(Singapore) Christopher van Huizen	(Singapore) Geylang International	
FW	(Singapore) Amy Recha	(Singapore) Geylang International	

==== Retained ====
Position	Player	Ref
GK	(Singapore) Rudy Khairullah	2 years contract signed in 2018
DF	(Singapore) Juma'at Jantan	2 years contract signed in 2018
MF	(Singapore) Izzdin Shafiq	

==== Extension ====
Position	Player	Ref
GK	(Singapore) Kenji Syed Rusydi	
DF	(Singapore) Abdil Qaiyyim Mutalib	1 Year Contract
DF	(Singapore) Aqhari Abdullah	1 Year Contract
DF	(Singapore) Faizal Roslan	1 Year Contract
DF	(Singapore) Faritz Abdul Hameed	1 Year Contract
MF	(South Korea) Song Ui-young	2 years contract signed in Oct 2018
MF	(Australia) Isaka Cernak	1 Year Contract
MF	(Singapore) Arshad Shamim	1 Year Contract
MF	(Singapore) Hafiz Nor	1 Year Contract
MF	(Singapore) Suhairi Sabri	1 Year Contract
MF	(Singapore) Fazli Ayob	1 Year Contract
MF	(Singapore) Muhelmy Suhaimi	
FW	(Singapore) Iqram Rifqi	1 Year Contract
FW	(Singapore) Shahril Ishak	1 Year Contract
FW	(Singapore) Amiruldin Asraf	1 Year Contract

==== Promoted ====
Position	Player	Ref

==== Trial ====
===== Trial (In) =====
Position	Player	Trial From	Ref

===== Trial (Out) =====
Position	Player	Trial @	Ref

== Friendlies ==
=== Pre-season friendlies ===
Win Draw Loss

8 January 2019 1	Singapore Cricket Club	0–5	(Singapore) Home United
1915 hours			Ho Wai Loon

11 January 2019 1	Johor Darul Ta'zim F.C. (Malaysia)	5–0	(Singapore) Home United	Johor Bahru, Johor
2100hours	Gonzalo Cabrera 8'; Aarón Ñíguez 13' (pen.); Hariss Harun 45'; Hazwan Bakri 51'; Safawi Rasid 88'	Report		Stadium: Tan Sri Dato' Haji Hassan Yunos Stadium

14 February 2019 3	Ceres–Negros F.C. (Philippines)	2–1	(Singapore) Home United	Bishan Stadium
745pm	Bienvenido Marañón; Stephan Schröck		Goal

Tour of Malaysia (18 to 27 January)

19 January 2019 1	Felda United (Malaysia)	3–1	(Singapore) Home United	Institut Semarak Felda, Selangor
2045hours	Jocinei Schad 17'; Hadin Azman 50'; Akhmar 83'		Abdil Qaiyyim Mutalib 36'	Stadium: Tun Abdul Razak Stadium

22 January 2019 2	Selangor FA (Malaysia)	3–1	(Singapore) Home United	Kuala Lumpur
2045hours	Antonio German 13'; Rufino 65', 77'		Hami Syahin 50'	Stadium: UM Arena Stadium

26 January 2019 3	Kedah FA (Malaysia)	4–0	(Singapore) Home United	Alor Star, Kedah
2045hours	Jonatan Bauman 12', 16'; Fernando Rodríguez 32'; Baddrol Bakhtiar 50'			Stadium: Darul Aman Stadium

== Team statistics ==
=== Appearances and goals ===
As of 15 March 2019

No.	Pos.	Player	Sleague		Singapore Cup		ACL / AFC Cup		Charity Shield		Total	
No.	Pos.	Player	Apps.	Goals	Apps.	Goals	Apps.	Goals	Apps.	Goals	Apps.	Goals
1	GK	(Singapore) Nazri Sabri	18(1)	0	1	0	4(1)	0	0	0	25	0
4	DF	(Singapore) Juma'at Jantan	10(5)	0	3	0	5(1)	0	0	0	24	0
6	DF	(Singapore) Abdil Qaiyyim Mutalib	22	1	3	0	7	2	1	0	32	3
7	DF	(Singapore) Aqhari Abdullah	15(3)	0	2	0	4(2)	0	1	0	26	0
8	MF	(Australia) Isaka Cernak	3(1)	0	1(1)	0	4(1)	0	0	0	11	0
9	DF	(Singapore) Faritz Abdul Hameed	12(5)	1	2	0	7	0	1	0	26	1
10	MF	(South Korea) Song Ui-young	16(2)	6	2(1)	2	3	3	0	0	24	11
11	MF	(Singapore) Hafiz Nor	15(5)	6	2(1)	0	5(2)	3	1	0	30	9
12	FW	(Singapore) Iqram Rifqi	15(1)	0	3	1	0(5)	0	1	0	24	1
13	MF	(Singapore) Izzdin Shafiq	9(2)	1	1(2)	0	7	0	1	0	21	1
14	MF	(Singapore) Fazli Ayob	0	0	0	0	1	0	0(1)	0	1	0
15	DF	(Singapore) Faizal Roslan	24	1	3	0	6	0	1	0	33	1
16	MF	(Singapore) Hami Syahin	18	2	3	0	5	1	1	0	26	3
17	FW	(Singapore) Shahril Ishak	12(4)	7	1(1)	0	2(1)	0	1	0	21	7
18	GK	(Singapore) Haikal Hasnol	3(1)	0	0	0	1	0	0	0	5	0
19	FW	(Singapore) Nur Hizami Salim	0(3)	0	0	0	0(1)	0	0	0	4	0
20	MF	(Singapore) Arshad Shamim	12(2)	1	0(1)	0	0(2)	0	0	0	17	1
21	DF	(Singapore) Taufiq Muqminin	3(3)	0	0	0	0(1)	0	0	0	7	0
22	DF	(Singapore) Ho Wai Loon	12(7)	0	0	0	4(2)	0	0(1)	0	25	0
23	FW	(Singapore) Amiruldin Asraf	12(5)	1	2	0	3	0	0	0	22	1
24	GK	(Singapore) Rudy Khairullah	3	0	2	0	3	0	1	0	8	0
25	MF	(Singapore) Suhairi Sabri	4(2)	0	1	0	0	0	0	0	7	0
26	FW	(Australia) Oliver Puflett	10(4)	4	1(1)	0	0	0	0	0	16	4
27	MF	(Singapore) Adam Swandi	13	3	0	0	7	1	1	0	20	4
28	MF	(Singapore) Muhelmy Suhaimi	3(3)	0	0	0	0(1)	0	0	0	7	0
37	MF	(Singapore) Anaqi Ismit	0(1)	0	0	0	0	0	0	0	1	0
47	MF	(Singapore) (Mali) Bill Mamadou	0(3)	0	0	0	0	0	0	0	3	0

Note 1: Ho Wai Loon scored an own goal in AFC Champions League qualifier against Persijia Jakarta.

== Competitions ==
=== Overview ===
Competition	Record							
Competition	P	W	D	L	GF	GA	GD	Win %
Charity Shield	1	0	1	0	0	0	+0	0.00
Singapore Premier League	24	9	3	12	34	46	−12	37.50
Singapore Cup	3	0	1	2	3	8	−5	0.00
AFC Champions League	1	0	0	1	1	3	−2	0.00
AFC Cup	6	3	1	2	9	11	−2	50.00
Total	35	12	6	17	47	58	−11	34.29

=== Charity Shield ===
Win Draw Loss

23 February 2019 Charity Shield	Albirex Niigata (S) (Singapore)	0–0 (4–5 p)	(Singapore) Home United	Jalan Besar Stadium
18:00	Souta Sugiyama (yellow card) 85'		Izzdin Shafiq (yellow card) 60'; Hami Syahin (yellow card) 77'	Referee: G. Letchman
	Penalties
	Kyoga Nakamura (penalty scored); Hiroyoshi Kamata (penalty missed); Daizo Horikoshi (penalty scored); Ryo Nakano (penalty missed); Kaishu Yamazaki (penalty scored); Shoki Ohara (penalty scored); Naruki Takahashi (penalty missed)		Adam Swandi (penalty scored); Aqhari Abdullah (penalty missed); Faritz Abdul Hameed (penalty missed); Izzdin Shafiq (penalty scored); Abdil Qaiyyim Mutalib (penalty scored); Faizal Roslan (penalty scored); Hami Syahin (penalty scored)

=== Singapore Premier League ===
Win Draw Loss

3 March 2019 1	Home United (Singapore)	0–1	Brunei DPMM	Bishan Stadium
	Abdil Qaiyyim Mutalib (yellow card) 35'; Hafiz Nor (yellow card) 93'		Andrey Varankow 21'; Blake Ricciuto (yellow card) 93'	Referee: Ahmad A'Qashah

8 March 2019 2	Tampines Rovers (Singapore)	5–1	(Singapore) Home United	Our Tampines Hub
	Irwan Shah 34'; Yasir Hanapi 41'; Taufik Suparno 50' (penalty missed) 16; Shahdan Sulaiman 59'; Jordan Webb 76' (pen.); Amirul Adli (yellow card) 58'		Adam Swandi 57'; Abdil Qaiyyim Mutalib (yellow card) 58'; Nazri Sabri (yellow card) 75'; Aqhari Abdullah (yellow card) 90'	Referee: Muhammad Taqi

17 March 2019 3	Home United (Singapore)	0–0	(Singapore) Balestier Khalsa	Bishan Stadium
	Juma'at Jantan (yellow card) 26'		Raihan Rahman (yellow card) 53'; Huzaifah Aziz (yellow card) 55'	Referee: Y.Sathyakumar

30 March 2019 4	Warriors FC (Singapore)	0–3	(Singapore) Home United	Jurong East Stadium
	Poh Yi Feng (yellow card) 7'; Fadhil Noh (yellow card) 32'; Gabriel Quak (yellow card) 42'; Sahil Suhaimi (yellow card) 71'; Ryhan Stewart (yellow card) 90'		Hami Syahin 51'; Song Ui-young 71'; Oliver Puflett 83' (yellow card) 72'; Izzdin Shafiq (yellow card) 34'	Referee: Muhammad Zulfiqar

6 April 2019 5	Home United (Singapore)	2–1	(Singapore) Young Lions FC	Bishan Stadium
	Izzdin Shafiq 7'; Adam Swandi 40'		Joshua Pereira 8'	Referee: Jansen Foo

12 April 2019 6	Hougang United (Singapore)	1–0	(Singapore) Home United	Jalan Besar Stadium
	Faris Ramli 83' (pen.); Fabian Kwok (yellow card) 64'; Fazrul Nawaz (yellow card) 90'		Aqhari Abdullah (yellow card) 63'; Hami Syahin (yellow card) 65'; Ho Wai Loon (yellow card) 81'	Referee: G. Letchman

24 April 2019 7	Home United (Singapore)	3–0	(Singapore) Geylang International	Bishan Stadium
	Oliver Puflett 9', 42'; Adam Swandi 58'; Hami Syahin (yellow card) 65'; Izzdin Shafiq (red card) 84'		Anders Aplin (yellow card) 24'; Barry Maguire (red card) 82'	Referee: Y.Sathyakumar

27 April 2019 8	Albirex Niigata (S) (Singapore)	4–0	(Singapore) Home United	Jurong East Stadium
	Kyoga Nakamura 2' (pen.) 45+4' (yellow card) 66'; Daizo Horikoshi 22'; Martens Daniel 38'; Souta Sugiyama (yellow card) 67'		Hami Syahin (yellow card) 52'; Adam Swandi (yellow card) 74'	Referee: Edwin Lee / G. Letchman

4 May 2019 9	Brunei DPMM	2–0	(Singapore) Home United	Hassanal Bolkiah National Stadium
	Abdul Azizi Ali Rahman 19'; Andrei Varankou 86'; Fakharrazi Hassan (yellow card) 54'; Nur Ikhwan Othman (yellow card) 66'; Hendra Azam Idris (yellow card) 68'; Azwan Ali Rahman (red card) 90'		Hami Syahin (yellow card) 39'; Aqhari Abdullah (yellow card) 74'	Referee: Farhan Mohamed

23 July 2019 10 (Rescheduled)	Home United (Singapore)	2–4	(Singapore) Tampines Rovers	Bishan Stadium
	Shahril Ishak 23'; Hafiz Nor 26'; Arshad Shamim (yellow card) 39'		Ryutaro Megumi 5'; Yasir Hanapi 58'; Jordan Webb 71' 76'	Referee: G. Letchman

26 May 2019 11	Balestier Khalsa (Singapore)	2–4	(Singapore) Home United	Bishan Stadium
	Sime Zuzul 42'; Sameer Alassane 45'; Raihan Rahman (yellow card) 44'; Nurullah Hussein (yellow card) 65'; Fadli Kamis (yellow card) 90'		Hafiz Nor 51' 79'; Song Ui-young 73'; Oliver Puflett 75'; Juma'at Jantan (yellow card) 65'	Referee: G. Letchman

15 June 2019 12	Home United (Singapore)	4–4	(Singapore) Warriors FC	Bishan Stadium
	Song Ui-young 10' 49'; Shahril Ishak 87' (pen.); Faizal Roslan 90'		Sahil Suhaimi 19'; Gabriel Quak 45' 52'; Jonathan Béhé 54'	Referee: Ahmad A'Qashah

29 June 2019 13	Home United (Singapore)	0–2	(Singapore) Hougang United	Bishan Stadium
	Aqhari Abdullah (yellow card) 18'; Hafiz Nor (yellow card) 52'; Shahril Ishak (red card) 52'; Hami Syahin (yellow card) 65'		Farhan Zulkifli 11'; Fazrul Nawaz 78'; Amir Zailani (yellow card) 38'; Nazrul Nazari (yellow card) 62'	Referee: Jansen Foo

3 July 2019 14	Young Lions FC (Singapore)	0–1	(Singapore) Home United	Jalan Besar Stadium
	Irfan Najeeb (yellow card) 18'; Zulqarnaen Suzliman (yellow card) 68'		Abdil Qaiyyim Mutalib 11'; Hami Syahin (yellow card) 38'	Referee: Nathan Chan

12 July 2019 15	Geylang International (Singapore)	2–3	(Singapore) Home United	Our Tampines Hub
	Noor Ariff 2' 10'		Hafiz Nor 5' 24'; Hami Syahin 42'; Faritz Abdul Hameed (yellow card) 79'; Abdil Qaiyyim Mutalib (yellow card) 90'	Referee: Muhd Taqi

18 July 2019 16 (Rescheduled)	Home United (Singapore)	3–3	(Singapore) Albirex Niigata (S)	Bishan Stadium
	Amiruldin Asraf 32'; Song Ui-young 81'; Shahril Ishak 84'; Aqhari Abdullah (yellow card) 75'		Yosuke Nakagawa 36' (yellow card) 63'; Hiroyoshi Kamata 56'; Kyoga Nakamura 79'	Referee: Muhammad Zulfiqar

27 July 2019 17	Home United (Singapore)	1–0	Brunei DPMM	Bishan Stadium
	Arshad Shamim 79'			Referee: Muhammad Taqi

3 August 2019 18	Tampines Rovers (Singapore)	3–0	(Singapore) Home United	Our Tampines Hub
	Shahdan Sulaiman 18'; Shah Shahiran 28'; Ryutaro Megumi 72'			Referee: Muhammad Zulfiqar

14 August 2019 19	Home United (Singapore)	1–3	(Singapore) Balestier Khalsa	Bishan Stadium
	Faritz Abdul Hameed 70'		Kristijan Krajcek 14' 84'; Hazzuwan Halim 66'	Referee: Farhan Mohamed

17 August 2019 20	Warriors FC (Singapore)	1–3	(Singapore) Home United	Jurong East Stadium
	Gabriel Quak 10'		Shahril Ishak 12', 71'; Hafiz Nor 68'	Referee: Jansen Foo

18 September 2019 21 (Rescheduled)	Home United (Singapore)	0–3	(Singapore) Young Lions FC	Bishan Stadium
			Zulqarnaen Suzliman 14'; Ilhan Fandi 20'; Saifullah Akbar 28' (pen.)	Referee: G.Letchman

1 September 2019 22	Hougang United (Singapore)	2–0	(Singapore) Home United	Jalan Besar Stadium
	Faris Ramli 74' (pen.); Iqbal Hussain 81'			Referee: Nathan Chan

21 September 2019 23	Home United (Singapore)	3–2	(Singapore) Geylang International	Bishan Stadium
	Shahril Ishak 5' 6'; Song Ui-young 85'		Amy Recha (penalty missed) 42 42'; Shawal Anuar 86'	Referee: Syarqawi Buhari

29 September 2019 24	Albirex Niigata (S) (Singapore)	1–0	(Singapore) Home United	Jurong East Stadium
	Hiroyoshi Kamata 15'			Referee: Nathan Chan

Pos	Team	Pld	W	D	L	GF	GA	GD	Pts
4	Albirex Niigata (S) (Note: The two foreign clubs – Albirex Niigata (S) and DPMM – as well as the Football Association of Singapore (FAS) under-21 team, Young Lions, are ineligible for any AFC competition spots.)	24	12	5	7	36	25	+11	41
5	Geylang International	24	10	3	11	41	48	−7	33
6	Home United	24	9	3	12	34	46	−12	30
7	Warriors	24	6	5	13	40	56	−16	23
8	Young Lions	24	6	4	14	21	38	−17	22

Source: Singapore Premier League
Rules for classification: 1) points; 2) goal difference; 3) number of goals scored; 4) number of wins

=== AFC Champions League ===
Win Draw Loss

==== Qualifying play-off ====
5 February 2019 Preliminary round 1	Home United (Singapore)	1–3	(Indonesia) Persija Jakarta	Singapore
	Song Ui-young 43'	Report	Ho Wai Loon 9' (o.g.); Beto Gonçalves 54'; Marko Šimić 84'	Stadium: Jalan Besar Stadium; Attendance: 1,893; Referee: Yaqoob Abdul Baki (Oman); Man of the Match: Marko Šimić (Croatia)

=== AFC Cup ===
Pos	Team	Pld	W	D	L	GF	GA	GD	Pts	Qualification	PSM	HOM	KAY	LAO
1	(Indonesia) PSM Makassar	6	4	2	0	17	8	+9	14	Zonal semi-finals	—	3–2	1–1	7–3
2	(Singapore) Home United	6	3	1	2	9	11	−2	10		1–1	—	2–0	1–0
3	(Philippines) Kaya–Iloilo	6	2	2	2	13	7	+6	8		1–2	5–0	—	5–1
4	(Laos) Lao Toyota	6	0	1	5	7	20	−13	1		0–3	2–3	1–1	—

Source: AFC
Rules for classification: Group stage tiebreakers

Win Draw Loss

==== Group stage ====
27 February 2018 Matchday 1	Home United (Singapore)	1–1	(Indonesia) PSM Makassar	Singapore
	Hami Syahin 63'; Adam Swandi (yellow card) 53'	Report	Eero Markkanen 26'; Zulham Zamrun (yellow card) 43'; Hendra Wijaya (yellow card) 56'	Stadium: Jalan Besar Stadium; Attendance: 1,589; Referee: Ammar Mahfoodh (Bahrain); Man of the Match: Hami Syahin (Singapore)

13 March 2018 Matchday 2	Kaya FC (Philippines)	5–0	(Singapore) Home United	Bacolod, Philippines
	Darryl Roberts 2' 37'; Jovin Bedic 33'; Alfred Osei 49' 55'; Camelo Tacusalme (yellow card) 59'	Report	Faizal Roslan (yellow card) 82'	Stadium: Panaad Stadium; Attendance: 527; Referee: Rowan Arumughan (India); Man of the Match: Darryl Roberts (Trinidad and Tobago)

2 April 2018 Matchday 3	Home United (Singapore)	1–0	(Laos) Lao Toyota	Singapore
	Abdil Qaiyyim Mutalib 45+1'; Nazri Sabri (yellow card) 85'	Report	Soma Otani (yellow card) 59'; Thipphachanh Inthavong (yellow card) 78'	Stadium: Jalan Besar Stadium; Attendance: 1,247; Referee: Mohamed Javiz (Maldives); Man of the Match: Abdil Qaiyyim Mutalib (Singapore)

17 April 2018 Matchday 4	Lao Toyota (Laos)	2–3	(Singapore) Home United	Vientiane, Laos
	Rafael de Sa Rodrigues 11'; Kazuo Homma 75' (pen.); Manolom Phomsouvanh (yellow card) 17'; Saison Khounsamnan (yellow card) 29'	Report	Song Ui-young 15' 40' (pen.) (yellow card) 61'; Hafiz Nor 89'; Aqhari Abdullah (yellow card) 64' (yellow-red card) 68'; Faizal Roslan (yellow card) 66'	Stadium: New Laos National Stadium; Referee: Hasan Akrami (Iran); Man of the Match: Song Ui-young (South Korea)

30 April 2018 Matchday 5	PSM Makassar (Indonesia)	3–2	(Singapore) Home United	Cibinong, Indonesia
	Marc Klok 60' (pen.) 78'; Guy Junior Ondoua 86'; Taufik Hidayat (yellow card) 73'	Report	Hafiz Nor 51' 55'; Iqram Rifqi (yellow card) 82'; Hami Syahin (yellow card) 90+1'	Stadium: Pakansari Stadium; Attendance: 517; Referee: Kim Hee-gon (South Korea); Man of the Match: Marc Klok (Netherlands)

14 May 2018 Matchday 6	Home United (Singapore)	2–0	(Philippines) Kaya FC	Singapore
	Adam Swandi 1'; Abdil Qaiyyim Mutalib 18'; Song Ui-young (yellow card) 45+2'	Report	Alfred Osei (yellow card) 35'	Stadium: Jalan Besar Stadium; Referee: Bijan Heidari (Iran)

=== Singapore Cup ===
Win Draw Loss

25 September 2019 Match 1	Home United (Singapore)	1–3	(Singapore) Balestier Khalsa	Bishan Stadium
	Song Ui-young 45' (pen.)		Sime Zuzul 35'; Kristijan Krajcek 52' 60'	Referee: Muhammad Zulfiqar

19 October 2019 Match 2	Warriors FC (Singapore)	2–2	(Singapore) Home United	Jurong East Stadium
	Khairul Nizam 46'; Gabriel Quak 62'		Iqram Rifqi 16'; Song Ui-young 68'	Referee: Syahir Ahmadi

23 October 2019 Match 3	Tampines Rovers (Singapore)	3–0	(Singapore) Home United	Our Tampines Hub
	Zehrudin Mehmedović 66'; Ryutaro Megumi 74'; Taufik Suparno 86'			Referee: G.Letchman
