= Puflett =

Puflett is a surname. Notable people with the surname include:

- Oliver Puflett (born 1999), an Australian soccer player
- Bob Puflett (1881–1968), an Australian rules footballer
