= Mesec =

Mesec is a surname. Notable people with the surname include:

- Luka Mesec (born 1987), Slovenian politician and activist
- Marjan Mesec (born 1947), Slovenian ski jumper
- Vedran Mesec (born 1988), Croatian footballer
