= Bob Puflett =

Australian rules footballer

Personal information
- Full name: Robert James Puflett
- Born: 17 August 1881; Fitzroy, Victoria
- Died: 5 August 1968 (aged 86); Neutral Bay, New South Wales
- Original team: Fitzroy Crescent

Playing career^{1}
Years	Club	Games (Goals)
1902	Melbourne	4 (0)
- ^{1} Playing statistics correct to the end of 1902.

Robert James Puflett (17 August 1881 – 5 August 1968) was an Australian rules footballer who played with Melbourne in the Victorian Football League (VFL).
