= Hanafi Akbar =

Singaporean professional footballer

Personal information
- Full name: Mohamad Hanafi bin Mohd Akbar
- Date of birth: 7 February 1995 (age 31)
- Place of birth: Singapore
- Position: Midfielder

Youth career
- 2008–2013: National Football Academy

Senior career*
Years	Team	Apps	(Gls)
2014–2017	Balestier Khalsa	12	(0)
2020–2023	Jungfrau Punggol	0	(0)

International career
2021—	Singapore	0	(0)
- * Club domestic league appearances and goals as of 02:57, 23 November 2014 (UTC)

Mohamad Hanafi bin Mohd Akbar (born 7 February 1995) is a Singaporean professional footballer who plays as a midfielder.

== Career ==
=== Youth career ===
Hanafi represented the Singapore national under-14 team at the 2009 Asian Youth Games, and was part of the national under-15 team which won the bronze medal at the 2010 Summer Youth Olympics. He attracted interest from Tottenham Hotspur and Juventus for his exploits at youth level.

However, he failed to capitalise on his talents, choosing the influence of bad company instead, Hanafi skipped training with the National Football Academy and quit the team in 2013.

=== Balestier Khalsa ===
He eventually signed a two-year contract with S.League club Balestier Khalsa in December 2013 after being written off as a "rebel" by many coaches.

However, he was arrested for drug use in 2015 and was eventually sentenced for a year's imprisonment. Hanafi rejoined the Tigers in 2017 after his release and made his return to football in a S.League game against Garena Young Lions on 2 April 2017. Coming on as a half-time substitute, Hanafi showed his early promise by playing a part in his team's solitary goal of the game. Hanafi controlled the ball on his chest before sending a glorious cross-field volley to teammate Hazzuwan Halim, who squared the ball for Myanmar forward Aung Kyaw Naing to slot home the winner from close range.

== Honours ==
Singapore U15

- Summer Youth Olympics: bronze medalist, 2010
