= Sanjin Vrebac =

Austrian footballer

Personal information
- Date of birth: 25 February 2000 (age 26)
- Place of birth: Wagna, Austria
- Height: 1.81 m (5 ft 11 in)
- Position: Midfielder

Team information
- Current team: TSV Meerbusch
- Number: 70

Youth career
- 2006–2009: SV Wildon
- 2009–2010: USV Allerheiligen
- 2010–2012: SV Flavia Solva
- 2012: USV Allerheiligen
- 2012–2013: SV Flavia Solva
- 2013: Deutschlandsberger SC
- 2013–2014: SU Rebenland Leutschach
- 2014–2016: Kapfenberger SV
- 2016–2017: SC Bayer 05 Uerdingen
- 2018: VfR Fischeln

Senior career*
Years	Team	Apps	(Gls)
2018–2019	Balestier Khalsa	33	(5)
2020–2021	FK Panevėžys	5	(0)
2021–2022	Wels	13	(4)
2022	Spittal/Drau	16	(1)
2022	SC Weiz	12	(2)
2023–2025	SV Sonsbeck	34	(7)
2025–2026	Schwarz-Weiß Essen	42	(6)
2026–	TSV Meerbusch	4	(0)
- * Club domestic league appearances and goals as of 16 October 2026

Sanjin Vrebac (born 25 February 2000) is an Austrian footballer who plays as a midfielder for German Oberliga Niederrhein club TSV Meerbusch.

== Career ==
=== Early career ===
Born in Wagna, Austria, Vrebac began his career with SV Wildon before moving to the academy of USV Allerheiligen. A spell with SV Flavia Solva, punctuated with a brief return to Allerheiligen, was followed by another short spell, this time with Deutschlandsberger SC. After playing for SU Rebenland Leutschach, Vrebac joined professional club Kapfenberger SV in September 2014. In 2016, Vrebac's family moved to Krefeld, Germany, and he joined the academy of SC Bayer 05 Uerdingen.

=== Balestier Khalsa ===
A short spell with VfR Fischeln was followed by a move to Singapore, where he joined Singapore Premier League club Balestier Khalsa. Initially signed for the under-19 squad, he made his debut for the first team shortly after joining, and notched an assist apiece in his first two games. On 16 August 2018, Balestier Khalsa reported fellow Singapore Premier League club Hougang United to the Football Association of Singapore (FAS) following an accusation by Vrebac that he was slapped by Hougang United general manager Matthew Tay after he had approached Hougang United's bench at full time in his club's 2–1 win the day before. On 23 October of the same year, Tay was acquitted of the charge following a review by the FAS disciplinary committee.

=== Return to Europe ===
After two years in Singapore, Vrebac moved to Lithuania, signing with A Lyga club FK Panevėžys. He left the club after just five appearances, in part due to the COVID-19 pandemic in Lithuania. He returned to his native Austria, joining Regionalliga Central club Wels, but after just half a season in Wels, he moved to fellow Regionalliga Central club Spittal/Drau.

In July 2023, having been released by SC Weiz, Vrebac returned to Germany, signing with SV Sonsbeck of the Oberliga Niederrhein. Despite an injury-hit first half of the season, Vrebac's performances earned him new contract with the club in May 2024. However, by December 2024, he announced his intention to leave the club in order to play professionally. On signing for fellow Oberliga Niederrhein club SW Essen in January 2025, Vrebac revealed that he had signed a deal with SV Sonsbeck that allowed him to leave the club for free, while former coaches expressed their frustration that he had left the club mid-way through the season.

In July 2026, after a year-and-a-half with SW Essen, Vrebac joined TSV Meerbusch, also competing in the Oberliga Niederrhein.

== Personal life ==
Vrebac is the son of football manager Beris Vrebac, who has coached at SV Orsoy in Germany. His brother is footballer Adi Vrebac, who currently plays for German club SV Gablingen.

== Career statistics ==
=== Club ===
As of 16 October 2026

Appearances and goals by club, season and competition
Club	Season	League			Cup		Other		Total	
Club	Season	Division	Apps	Goals	Apps	Goals	Apps	Goals	Apps	Goals
Balestier Khalsa	2018	Singapore Premier League	9	0	2 (Note: Appearances in the Singapore Cup)	0	0	0	11	0
Balestier Khalsa	2019	Singapore Premier League	24	5	3	0	0	0	27	5
Balestier Khalsa	Total		33	5	5	0	0	0	38	5
FK Panevėžys	2020	A Lyga	5	0	0	0	0	0	5	0
Wels	2021–22	Regionalliga Central	13	4	0	0	0	0	13	4
Spittal/Drau	2021–22	Regionalliga Central	16	1	0	0	0	0	16	1
SC Weiz	2022–23	Regionalliga Central	12	2	0	0	0	0	12	2
SV Sonsbeck	2023–24	Oberliga Niederrhein	18	3	0	0	0	0	18	3
SV Sonsbeck	2024–25	Oberliga Niederrhein	16	4	0	0	3 (Note: Appearances in the Lower Rhine Cup)	0	19	4
SV Sonsbeck	Total		34	7	0	0	3	0	37	7
SW Essen	2024–25	Oberliga Niederrhein	15	2	0	0	0	0	15	2
SW Essen	2025–26	Oberliga Niederrhein	27	4	0	0	1	0	28	4
SW Essen	Total		42	6	0	0	1	0	43	6
TSV Meerbusch	2026–27	Oberliga Niederrhein	4	0	0	0	1	0	5	0
Career total			159	25	5	0	5	0	189	25
