= Dušan Marinković =

Serbian footballer

Personal information
- Date of birth: 22 May 2000 (age 26)
- Height: 1.70 m (5 ft 7 in)
- Position: Forward

Youth career
- FK Internacional
- 2017: Shanghai ReUnited

Senior career*
Years	Team	Apps	(Gls)
2018	Balestier Khalsa	4	(0)
- * Club domestic league appearances and goals as of 15:04, 6 January 2019 (UTC)

Dušan Marinković (born 22 May 2000) is a Serbian footballer who plays as a forward.

He joined Singaporese side Balestier Khalsa in summer 2018.

== Career statistics ==
=== Club ===
As of 6 January 2019.

Club	Season	League			Cup		Continental		Other		Total	
Club	Season	Division	Apps	Goals	Apps	Goals	Apps	Goals	Apps	Goals	Apps	Goals
Balestier Khalsa	2018	Singapore Premier League	4	0	0	0	–		0	0	4	0
Career total			4	0	0	0	0	0	0	0	4	0
