= Ashrul Syafeeq =

Singaporean footballer

Personal information
- Full name: Ashrul Syafeeq bin Mohamed Amin
- Date of birth: 11 April 1994 (age 32)
- Place of birth: Singapore
- Height: 1.81 m (5 ft 11 1/2 in)
- Position: Defender

Team information
- Current team: Hougang United
- Number: 4

Youth career
- 2012: Hougang United
- 2013 – 2014: Geylang International
- 2015: National Football Academy

Senior career*
Years	Team	Apps	(Gls)
2016	Young Lions FC	6	(0)
2017	Balestier Khalsa	?	(?)
2018–	Hougang United	?	(?)
- * Club domestic league appearances and goals as of July 8, 2018

Ashrul Syafeeq is a Singaporean footballer who plays for Hougang United as a defender.

== Club career ==
=== Young Lions FC ===
Ashrul began his professional football career with Garena Young Lions in the Sleague in 2016. He had also played prime league football with teams like Geylang International and Hougang United.

=== Balestier Khalsa ===
In December 2016, Ashrul was said to have signed for Balestier Khalsa as the Young Lions team only want players who are born 1995 and/or after as they prepare for the 2017 SEA Games to be held in Kuala Lumpur.

=== Hougang United ===
After being released by Balestier at the end of the 2017 season, Ashrul agreed to join Hougang United for the 2018 season.

== Personal life ==
He is the son of former Singapore international and Balestier player Amin Nasir who died on 15 January 2017 at the age of 48. Ashrul is also a leukaemia survivor.
