= Akbar Shah (footballer) =

Singaporean footballer

Personal information
- Full name: Akbar Shah Zainudeen
- Date of birth: 29 May 1996 (age 30)
- Place of birth: Singapore
- Positions: Midfielder; forward

Senior career*
| Years | Team | Apps | (Gls) |
| 2018-2019 | Balestier Khalsa FC | 18 | (2) |
- * Club domestic league appearances and goals

Akbar Shah (born 29 May 1996 in Singapore) is a Singaporean footballer, who plays as a midfielder or forward.
