= Shaqi Sulaiman =

Singaporean footballer

Personal information
- Date of birth: 11 October 1998 (age 28)
- Place of birth: Singapore

Senior career*
Years	Team	Apps	(Gls)
	Home United Football Club	0	(0)
-2017	Hougang United FC	0	(0)
2018-2019	Balestier Khalsa FC	14	(0)
- * Club domestic league appearances and goals

Shaqi Sulaiman (born 11 October 1998 in Singapore) is a Singaporean footballer.
