= Nazri Sabri =

Singaporean footballer

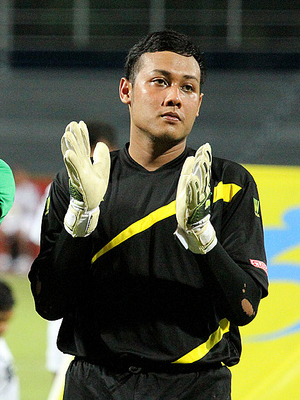
- Nazri Sabri playing for Hougang United FC in the League Cup against Home United on 11 June 2013.

Personal information
- Full name: Mohamad Nazri bin Sabri
- Date of birth: September 20, 1989 (age 37)
- Place of birth: Singapore
- Height: 1.77 m (5 ft 9 1/2 in)
- Position: Goalkeeper

Team information
- Current team: Home United

Senior career*
Years	Team	Apps	(Gls)
2010	Home United	1	(0)
2011	Geylang International	2	(0)
2012	Home United	7	(0)
2013	Woodlands Wellington	0	(0)
2014	Hougang United	1	(0)
2018	Balestier Khalsa	0	(0)
2019-	Home United	19	(0)
- * Club domestic league appearances and goals as of 7 October 2019

Nazri Sabri is a footballer who plays for Home United as a goalkeeper in the S.League.

== Club career ==
Nazri Sabri started his footballing career in Home United in the 2010 season, making his S.League debut against Beijing Guoan Talent on 2 August 2010.

He then moved to Geylang United in the 2011 S.League season before returning to the Protectors in the 2012 S.League season. Nazri played nine matches for Home United that year including a S.League match against his former club Geylang United which ended 7-3 in favour of the Protectors.

Nazri was released by Home United following the end of the 2012 S.League season and it was announced that he had joined Woodlands Wellington during the 2013 S.League mid season transfer window, coming in as a replacement for the injured Ahmadulhaq Che Omar, who tore his anterior crucial ligament earlier in the season.

He made his debut for Woodlands Wellington in a 2013 Singapore League Cup match against his former employers, Home United, on 11 June 2013.

=== Club career statistics ===
As of 20 March 2018

Club	Season	League	League		Singapore Cup		League Cup		Total	
Club	Season	League	Apps	Goals	Apps	Goals	Apps	Goals	Apps	Goals
Home United	2010	S.League	1	0	0	0	0	0	1	0
Geylang United	2011	S.League	2	0	0	0	0	0	2	0
Home United	2012	S.League	7	0	2	0	0	0	9	0
Woodlands Wellington	2013	S.League	0	0	0	0	1	0	1	0
Hougang United	2014	S.League	7	0	0	0	0	0	7	0
Balestier Khalsa	2018	S.League	0	0	0	0	0	0	0	0

All numbers encased in brackets signify substitute appearances.
