= Keegan Linderboom =

South African-born New Zealand footballer (born 1989)

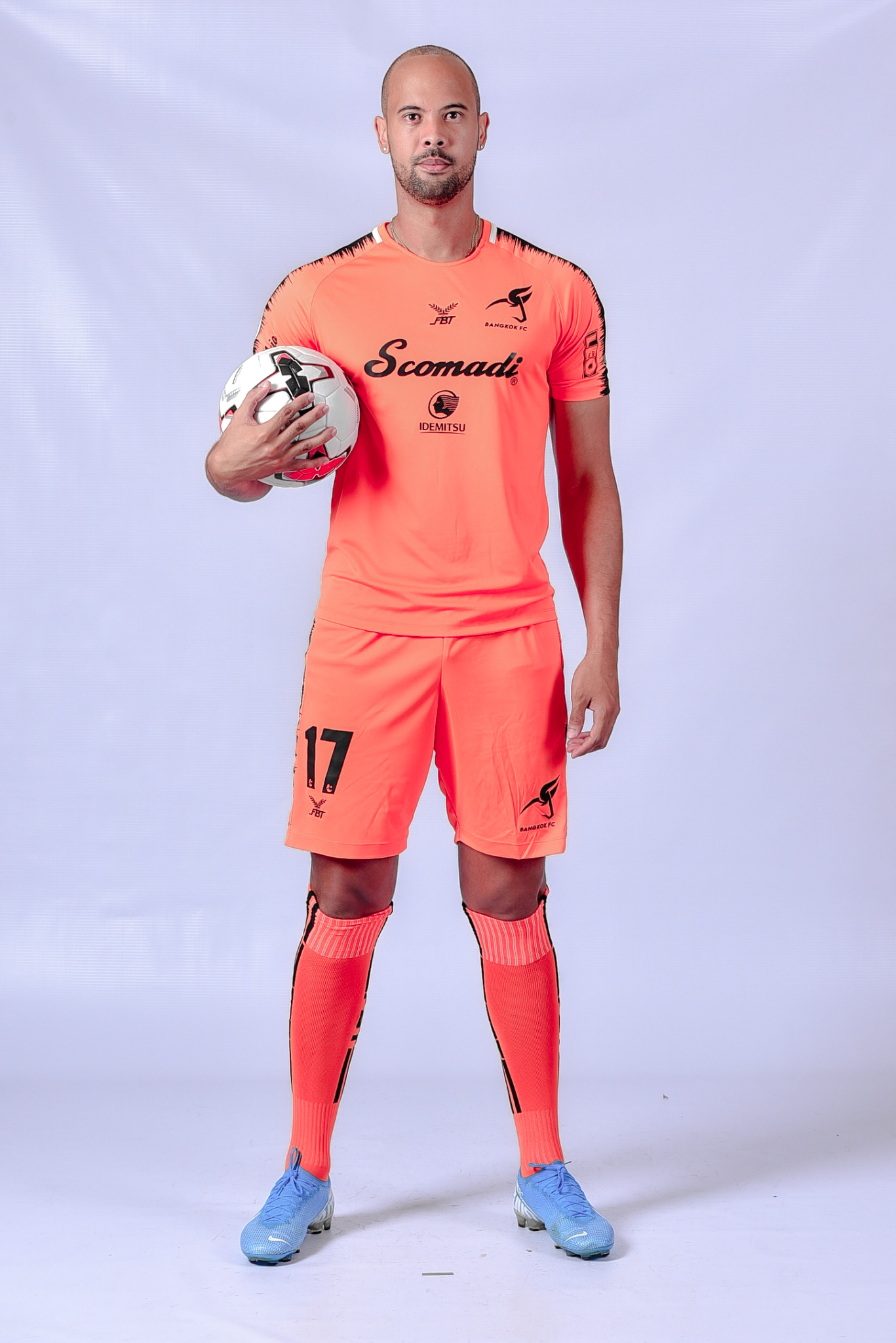
- Linderboom with Bangkok FC 2020

Personal information
- Full name: Keegan Linderboom
- Date of birth: 26 September 1989 (age 37)
- Place of birth: Durban, South Africa
- Height: 1.88 m (6 ft 2 in)
- Position: Forward

Youth career
- Waitakere United

Senior career*
Years	Team	Apps	(Gls)
2009	Waitakere United		
2010	West Auckland		
2010–2011	Waitakere United		
2012–2015	Birkenhead United	21	(19)
2015	Ba FC	6	
2015	Eastern Suburbs AFC		
2016–2017	Waitakere United	31	(14)
2018	Balestier Khalsa	17	(7)
2019	Keilor Park	11	(5)
2019	Mill Park	6	(3)
2019	Auckland City	1	(0)
2020–2021	Bangkok FC	18	(7)
- * Club domestic league appearances and goals as of 28 January 2021

Keegan Linderboom (born 26 September 1989) is a retired South African professional footballer who played as a forward. To date, Keegan has played in 5 countries including Singapore, Thailand, Australia and Fiji.

== Club career ==
Linderboom had an instant impact in his Birkenhead United career, scoring seven goals in the first five rounds of the competition.

After finishing as top goal scorer at the 2014 Pacific Cup, Linderboom signed for Ba FC for the 2015 OFC Champions League. He helped guide Ba to the Semi Finals.

Linderboom scored 15 goals in 31 games for Waitakere United over two years before joining Singapore Premier League side Balestier Khalsa ahead of the 2018 Singapore Premier League, rejecting offers from Auckland City FC and South African top-tier side Bloemfontein Celtic. Linderboom scored his first goal for the Tigers on his debut. He followed that up by scoring 4 goals in his first 6 appearances for Balestier before getting injured. On his first game back from injury he scored the winner against Young Lions securing Balestiers first win in 7 games since his injury.

After a brief stint overseas in Melbourne Australia, Linderboom signed back in his home country for Auckland City In August 2019.

He did not spend long back in New Zealand before signing for Thailand club Bangkok FC in January 2020. Linderboom scored 2 goals from 3 games before COVID-19 ended the season. He rejoined Bangkok FC for the next season and helped the club achieve the playoffs.

Linderboom returned to New Zealand after the Thai season ended in April 2021 and signed for Manukau United in the Auckland premier league.
