= Ahmad Syahir =

Singaporean footballer

Personal information
- Full name: Ahmad Syahir bin Sahimi
- Date of birth: 10 April 1992 (age 34)
- Place of birth: Singapore
- Height: 1.56 m (5 ft 1 in)
- Positions: Left-back; left midfielder

Team information
- Current team: Geylang International
- Number: 14

Senior career*
Years	Team	Apps	(Gls)
2010	Young Lions	1	(0)
2013–2021	Balestier Khalsa	167	(1)
2022–	Geylang International	30	(0)
- * Club domestic league appearances and goals as of 5 Feb 2021 ‡ National team caps and goals as of 5 Feb 2021

Ahmad Syahir bin Sahimi (born 10 April 1992) is a Singaporean footballer who plays as a left-back or left-midfielder for Singapore Premier League club Geylang International.

He is known as one of the shortest players in the Singapore Premier League and the longest serving player at Balestier Khalsa in their history.

== Club career ==
=== Young Lions ===
Ahmad began his career with Young Lions in the 2010 season.

=== Balestier Khalsa ===
After serving his two years compulsory National Service, Ahmad joined Balestier Khalsa ahead of the 2013 season. From the 2014 season, he was used as a regular starter for the club.

After 9 seasons at Balestier Khalsa and accumulating a total of 167 appearances, his contract wasn't renewed for the 2022 season.

=== Geylang International ===
Ahmad joined Geylang International ahead of the 2022 Singapore Premier League season.

== Career statistics ==
=== Club ===
As of 19 Aug 2022

Club	Season	League			FA Cup		League Cup		Continental		Total	
Club	Season	Division	Apps	Goals	Apps	Goals	Apps	Goals	Apps	Goals	Apps	Goals
Young Lions FC	2010	S.League	0	0	0	0	1	0	0	0	1	0
Balestier Khalsa	2013	S.League	2	0	2	0	0	0	0	0	4	0
Balestier Khalsa	2014	S.League	12	0	2	0	3	0	0	0	17	0
Balestier Khalsa	2015	S.League	13	0	1	0	4	0	5	0	23	0
Balestier Khalsa	2016	S.League	11	0	5	1	3	0	5	0	24	1
Balestier Khalsa	2017	S.League	20	0	1	0	3	0	0	0	24	0
Balestier Khalsa	2018	Singapore Premier League	21	0	4	0	0	0	0	0	25	0
Balestier Khalsa	2019	Singapore Premier League	18	0	1	0	0	0	0	0	19	0
Balestier Khalsa	2020	Singapore Premier League	13	0	0	0	0	0	0	0	13	0
Balestier Khalsa	2021	Singapore Premier League	18	0	0	0	0	0	0	0	18	0
Balestier Khalsa	Total		128	0	16	1	13	0	10	0	167	1
Geylang International	2022	Singapore Premier League	19	0	0	0	0	0	0	0	19	0
Geylang International	2023	Singapore Premier League	11	0	1	0	0	0	0	0	12	0
Geylang International	2024–25	Singapore Premier League	0	0	0	0	0	0	0	0	0	0
Geylang International	Total		30	0	1	0	0	0	0	0	31	0
Career total			158	0	17	1	14	0	10	0	199	1
