= Jonathan Tan (footballer) =

Singaporean footballer

Personal information
- Full name: Jonathan Tan Zen Yang
- Date of birth: 13 December 1995 (age 30)
- Place of birth: Singapore
- Height: 1.72 m (5 ft 7 1/2 in)
- Position: Left winger

Team information
- Current team: Balestier Khalsa
- Number: 20

Youth career
- –2013: National Football Academy

Senior career*
Years	Team	Apps	(Gls)
2014–2015	Geylang International	4	(0)
2016	Young Lions	8	(0)
2017	Balestier Khalsa	0	(0)

International career
2014–	Singapore U21		
- * Club domestic league appearances and goals

Jonathan Tan Zen Yang (born 13 December 1995) is a Singaporean footballer who plays as a left winger for Singapore Premier League club Balestier Khalsa.

== Career ==
=== Geylang International ===
Tan signed for Geylang International in the 2014 season. He made his debut in the second half of a 2–1 away loss to Warriors on 23 February.

=== Young Lions ===
He opts to join the Young Lions in 2016 as he fights for the SEA Games squad in 2017.

=== Balestier Khalsa ===
It was announced that he joined the Tigers for the 2017 season.

== International career ==
He represented the Singapore national under-14 team at the 2009 Asian Youth Games, and was part of the national under-15 team which won the bronze medal at the 2010 Summer Youth Olympics.

== International Statistics ==
=== U19 International caps ===
No	Date	Venue	Opponent	Result	Competition
1	9 September 2013	Gelora Delta Stadium, Sidoarjo, Indonesia	Timor-Leste	1-1 (draw)	2013 AFF U-19 Youth Championship
2	13 September 2013	Gelora Delta Stadium, Sidoarjo, Indonesia	Laos	2-0 (won)	2013 AFF U-19 Youth Championship
3	17 September 2013	Petrokimia Stadium, Gresik, Indonesia	Cambodia	2-3 (lost)	2013 AFF U-19 Youth Championship
4	8 October 2013	Thai-Japanese Stadium, Bangkok, Thailand	Thailand	0-3 (lost)	2014 AFC U-19 Championship qualification
5	10 October 2013	Thai-Japanese Stadium, Bangkok, Thailand	North Korea	0-4 (lost)	2014 AFC U-19 Championship qualification
6	12 October 2013	Thai-Japanese Stadium, Bangkok, Thailand	Brunei	3-1 (won)	2014 AFC U-19 Championship qualification

=== U19 International goals ===
No	Date	Venue	Opponent	Score	Result	Competition
1	12 October 2013	Thai-Japanese Stadium, Bangkok, Thailand	Brunei	3-1	3-1	2014 AFC U-19 Championship qualification

== Honours ==
Singapore U15

- Summer Youth Olympics: bronze medalist, 2010
