= Vedran Mesec =

Croatian footballer

Personal information
- Full name: Vedran Mesec
- Date of birth: 20 February 1988 (age 38)
- Place of birth: Zagreb, SFR Yugoslavia
- Height: 1.88 m (6 ft 2 in)
- Position: Forward

Team information
- Current team: Union Peuerbach
- Number: 9

Youth career
- 1997–2006: Croatia Sesvete

Senior career*
Years	Team	Apps	(Gls)
2005–2006	Croatia Sesvete	0	(0)
2006–2007	Maksimir	28	(14)
2007–2008	Croatia Sesvete	3	(0)
2008–2009	Zelina	39	(51)
2009–2010	Maksimir	3	(0)
2010	Segesta	4	(0)
2010–2014	Zelina	100	(40)
2014–2016	Etzella	43	(8)
2016–2017	Sesvete	17	(9)
2017–2018	Aluminij	25	(4)
2018–2019	Balestier Khalsa	14	(2)
2019–2020	Sesvete	12	(2)
2020-2021	Lučko	15	(10)
2021	Trnje		
2022-	Union Peuerbach	24	(18)
- * Club domestic league appearances and goals as of 27 October 2022

Vedran Mesec (born 20 February 1988) is a Croatian footballer who plays as a forward for Austrian Landesliga side Union Peuerbach.

== Career ==
Mesec signed for Singapore Premier League side Balestier Khalsa ahead of the 2018 Singapore Premier League. Mesec made his debut for the Tigers in a 3–1 loss to Home United. Although often played as a midfielder, he notched a goal in his first six appearances.
