= Sufianto Salleh =

Singaporean footballer

Personal information
- Full name: Sufianto Salleh
- Date of birth: 9 March 1993 (age 33)
- Place of birth: Singapore
- Position: Defender

Team information
- Current team: Balestier Khalsa FC
- Number: 19

Youth career
- 2011: National Football Academy
- 2014: Home United Academy

Senior career*
Years	Team	Apps	(Gls)
2012 – 2013	Young Lions FC	15	(0)
2015 –17	Home United	32	(1)
2018 -	Balestier Khalsa	31	(0)

International career
2011	Singapore U18		
2015 –	Singapore U22	4	(1)
- * Club domestic league appearances and goals as of October 5, 2019

Sufianto Salleh is a Singaporean footballer who plays for Home United FC as a defender. He was converted to a defender having played as a striker in his earlier career.

He started playing in the Sleague for Young Lions FC in 2012 before moving to the Home United prime league team in 2014 and was promoted to the Sleague squad in 2016.

== Club career ==
=== Young Lions FC ===
Sufianto began his professional football career with Garena Young Lions in the Sleague in 2012. He played mainly as a striker for 2 years before being released by the team.

=== Home United ===
After released by the Young Lions, he joined the Home United academy to play in their prime league squad. He was later promoted to the main squad in 2015 and was converted to a left back by Philipe Aw.

== Career statistics ==
Club	Season	S.League		Singapore Cup		Singapore League Cup		Asia		Total	
Club	Season	Apps	Goals	Apps	Goals	Apps	Goals	Apps	Goals	Apps	Goals
Young Lions	2012	4	0	0	0	0	0	—		4	0
Young Lions	2013	11	0	0	0	0	0	—		11	0
Home United	2015	10	0	2	0	1	0	—		13	0
Home United	2016	7	0	0	0	2	0	—		9	0
Home United	2017	0	0	0	0	0	0	—		0	0
