= Sheikh Abdul Hadi (footballer) =

Singaporean footballer

Personal information
- Full name: Sheikh Abdul Hadi Bin Sh Othman
- Date of birth: 24 March 1992 (age 34)
- Place of birth: Singapore
- Height: 1.83 m (6 ft 0 in)
- Position: Defender

Team information
- Current team: Balestier Khalsa
- Number: 12

Senior career*
Years	Team	Apps	(Gls)
2011	Gombak United	1	(0)
2011–2015	Courts Young Lions	73	(0)
2016–	Balestier Khalsa	28	(0)

International career
2014–	Singapore U23	??	(1)
- * Club domestic league appearances and goals as of 21:41, 22 October 2016 (UTC)

Sheikh Abdul Hadi Bin Sh Othman (born 24 March 1992) is a Singaporean footballer who plays as a defender for S.League club Balestier Khalsa FC.

== Personal life ==
Sheikh studied at Fuhua Primary School from 1999 to 2004, before going on to Jurongville Secondary School, and then Republic Polytechnic.

== Club career ==
=== Gombak United ===
Sheikh Abdul Hadi began his professional football career with Gombak United in the S.League in 2011.

=== Young Lions ===
On the same year, he went on and sign for the Under-23 side Young Lions. At the end of 2015, Hadi left the Young Lions in search for a new club.

=== Balestier Khalsa ===
After leaving the Young Lions, Hadi sign for the Balestier Khalsa in 2016.

== Career statistics ==
As of match played November 2016. Caps and goals may not be correct

Club	Season	S.League		Singapore Cup		Singapore League Cup		Asia		Total	
Club	Season	Apps	Goals	Apps	Goals	Apps	Goals	Apps	Goals	Apps	Goals
Gombak United	2011	1	0	0	0	0	0	—		1	0
Gombak United	Total	1	0	0	0	0	0	0	0	1	0
Courts Young Lions	2011	8	0	0	0	0	0	—		8	0
Courts Young Lions	2012	16	0	0	0	4	0	—		20	0
Courts Young Lions	2013	18	0	1	0	1	0	—		20	0
Courts Young Lions	2014	12	0	0	0	0	0	—		12	0
Courts Young Lions	2015	19	0	0	0	0	0	—		19	0
Courts Young Lions	Total	73	0	1	0	5	0	0	0	79	0
Balestier Khalsa	2016	22	0	4	0	3	0	6	0	29	0
Balestier Khalsa	2017	0	0	0	0	0	0	—		0	0
Balestier Khalsa	Total	22	0	4	0	3	0	6	0	29	0
Career total		96	0	5	0	8	0	0	0	109	0

=== U23 International goals ===
No	Date	Venue	Opponent	Score	Result	Competition
1	1 June 2015	Jalan Besar Stadium, Singapore	Philippines	1-0	1-0	2015 Southeast Asian Games
