= Oliver Puflett =

Australian soccer player

Personal information
- Full name: Oliver Puflett
- Date of birth: 26 July 1999 (age 27)
- Place of birth: Randwick, Australia
- Height: 1.88 m (6 ft 2 in)
- Position: Forward

Team information
- Current team: Rockdale Ilinden

Youth career
- Sydney Olympic
- 2016: Western Sydney Wanderers

Senior career*
Years	Team	Apps	(Gls)
2016–2019	Western Sydney Wanderers NPL	45	(7)
2019–2020	Home United	14	(4)
2020–2024	Sydney Olympic	106	(17)
2025–	Rockdale Ilinden	29	(1)

International career
2018	Australia U20	3	(1)
- * Club domestic league appearances and goals as of 6 October 2023

Oliver Puflett (born 26 July 1999) is an Australian soccer player who plays as a striker for Rockdale Ilinden.

== Youth career ==
Puflett started his career with the Western Sydney Wanderers FC, playing for its Under-21 team, scoring 5 goals in 11 games over 2 years. He also won the Y-League title in the 2017–18 season with them.

== Career ==
=== Home United ===
He played for the Western Sydney Wanderers FC Under-21 squad before signing his first professional contract and joining Singapore Premier League side Home United FC in March 2019.

He then made his debut a day after his signing, scoring a goal with an exquisite lobbed finish on his professional debut in a Uniform Derby win against Warriors FC.

== Career statistics ==
As of 11 June 2019

Club performance
Club	Season	S.League		Singapore Cup		Singapore League Cup		Total	
Club	Season	Apps	Goals	Apps	Goals	Apps	Goals	Apps	Goals
Home United	2019	7	4	0	0	0	0	7	4
Total		7	4	0	0	0	0	7	4
