= Toa Payoh Stadium =

Stadium in Toa Payoh, Singapore

Coordinates: 1°19′49″N 103°51′10″E

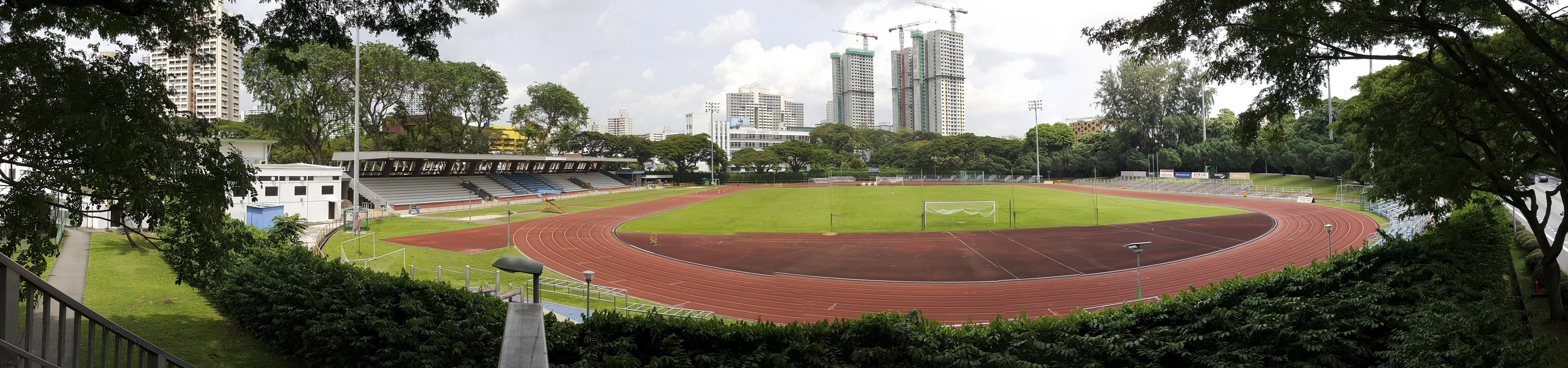
- Interactive map of Toa Payoh Stadium
- Location: 297 Lorong 6 Toa Payoh, Singapore 319389
- Owner: Sport Singapore
- Operator: Sport Singapore
- Capacity: 3,800
- Public transit: NS19 Toa Payoh

Construction
- Opened: 1 March 1974; 52 years ago
- Closed: 2023; 3 years ago
- Demolished: 2024; 2 years ago

Tenant
- Balestier Khalsa FC (2002– 2022)

Toa Payoh Stadium was a multi-purpose stadium in Toa Payoh, Singapore. It was used mostly for football matches and was the home stadium of Toa Payoh United and later Balestier Khalsa. The stadium held 3,800 people. It was taken over by the then Singapore Sports Council on 30 November 1973, and opened to the public on 1 March 1974.

== History and redevelopment ==
The stadium was closed and demolished in August 2024, with the general vicinity being redeveloped as part of the Toa Payoh Integrated Development (TPID), with facilities such as a library, a much larger stadium, polyclinic and swimming complex by 2030.

== Facility ==
The stadium had a total seating capacity of 3,964 people. The stadium consists of a soccer field, an 8-lane running track and a fitness corner.

== See also ==
- List of stadiums in Singapore
