= Fadli Kamis =

Singaporean footballer

Personal information
- Full name: Muhammad Fadli bin Kamis
- Date of birth: 7 November 1992 (age 33)
- Place of birth: Singapore
- Height: 1.73 m (5 ft 8 in)
- Position: Defender

Team information
- Current team: Lion City Sailors
- Number: 2

Senior career*
Years	Team	Apps	(Gls)
2011–2013	Geylang International	5	(0)
2014–2015	Courts Young Lions	46	(1)
2016–2021	Balestier Khalsa	92	(12)
2022–2024	Geylang International	23	(0)
2024–	Lion City Sailors	0	(0)

International career^{‡}
2014	Singapore U23	3	(0)
2014–2019	Singapore	3	(0)
- * Club domestic league appearances and goals as of 19 August 2017 ‡ National team caps and goals as of 11 June 2019

Muhammad Fadli bin Kamis (born 7 November 1992) is a Singaporean professional footballer who plays as a defender for Singapore Premier League club Lion City Sailors.

== Club career ==
Fadli started his career at S.League club Geylang International before moving to under-23 developmental side Courts Young Lions for the 2014 season. He stayed in the club for one year before moving on to Balestier Khalsa.

== International career ==
Fadli represented Singapore U23 at the 2014 Asian Games. He made his senior international debut in the starting line-up of a friendly match against Papua New Guinea on 6 September 2014. Fadli got his second cap for the national team after five years on 8 June 2019, in the friendly against Solomon Islands. Fadli got his first start for the national team in his third match in Singapore colors on 11 June 2019 against Myanmar.

=== Geylang International ===
On 13 November 2021, Fadli returned to Geylang International FC.

== Career statistics ==
=== Club ===
As of match played 30 Sept 2023. Caps and goals may not be correct.

Club	Season	S.League		Singapore Cup		Singapore League Cup		Asia		Total	
Club	Season	Apps	Goals	Apps	Goals	Apps	Goals	Apps	Goals	Apps	Goals
Geylang International	2011	5	0	-	-	0	0	—		5	0
Geylang International	2012	??	??	-	-	??	??	—		??	??
Geylang International	2013	??	??	-	-	??	??	—		??	??
Geylang International	Total	5	0	0	0	0	0	0	0	5	0
Young Lions	2014	23	0	0	0	0	0	—		23	0
Young Lions	2015	23	1	0	0	0	0	—		23	1
Young Lions	Total	46	1	0	0	0	0	0	0	46	1
Balestier Khalsa	2016	22	4	5	0	4	0	5	0	36	4
Balestier Khalsa	2017	23	3	1	0	2	1	—		26	4
Balestier Khalsa	2018	23	4	5	0	0	0	—		28	4
Balestier Khalsa	2019	20	1	0	0	0	0	—		20	1
Balestier Khalsa	2020	12	0	0	0	0	0	—		12	0
Balestier Khalsa	2021	21	0	0	0	0	0	—		21	0
Balestier Khalsa	Total	121	12	11	0	6	1	5	0	144	13
Geylang International	2022	6	0	0	0	0	0	0	0	6	0
Geylang International	2023	17	0	1	0	0	0	0	0	18	0
Geylang International	Total	23	0	1	0	0	0	0	0	24	0
Career total		195	13	12	0	6	1	5	0	216	14

== International Statistics ==
International caps

No	Date	Venue	Opponent	Result	Competition
1	6 September 2014	Hougang Stadium, Hougang, Singapore	Papua New Guinea	2-1 (won)	Friendly
2	8 June 2019	Singapore Sports Hub, Kallang, Singapore	Solomon Islands	4-3 (won)	Friendly
3	11 June 2019	Singapore Sports Hub, Kallang, Singapore	Myanmar	1-2 (lost)	Friendly

Singapore national team
Year	Apps	Goals
2014	1	0
2019	2	0
Total	3	0
