= Nurullah Hussein =

Singaporean footballer

Personal information
- Full name: Muhammad Nurullah bin Mohamed Hussein
- Date of birth: May 9, 1993 (age 33)
- Place of birth: Singapore
- Height: 1.85 m (6 ft 1 in)
- Position: Defender

Senior career*
Years	Team	Apps	(Gls)
2012	Gombak United	21	(0)
2013	Young Lions	4	(0)
2014–2019	Balestier Khalsa	78	(1)
2020	Geylang International FC	1	(0)
- * Club domestic league appearances and goals as of 24 November 2020

Muhammad Nurullah bin Mohamed Hussein (born May 8, 1993) is a Singaporean footballer formerly played as a defender for Geylang International FC in Singapore Premier League.

== Honours ==
=== Club ===
Balestier Khalsa

- Singapore Cup (1) : 2014
