= Huzaifah Aziz =

Singaporean footballer

Personal information
- Full name: Huzaifah Abdul Aziz
- Date of birth: 27 June 1994 (age 32)
- Place of birth: Singapore
- Positions: Midfielder; defender

Team information
- Current team: Hougang United

Youth career
- 2012: Home United
- 2013–2014: Geylang International

Senior career*
Years	Team	Apps	(Gls)
2014–2015	Geylang International	14	(0)
2016	Hougang United	16	(0)
2017–2020	Balestier Khalsa	41	(7)
2020–2021	Tampines Rovers	13	(0)
2021–2025	Geylang International	45	(0)
2025–	Hougang United	22	(0)

International career^{‡}
- Singapore U18
2018–	Singapore	6	(0)
- * Club domestic league appearances and goals as of 18 July 2021 ‡ National team caps and goals as of 11 June 2019

Huzaifah Abdul Aziz is a Singaporean professional footballer who plays primarily as a central-midfielder for Singapore Premier League club Hougang United and the Singapore National Team.

A versatile player, Huzaifah is also capable as a defensive-midfielder, left-back or centre-back. He is the nephew of former Singapore International Malek Awab.

== Club career ==
=== Geylang International ===
He made his senior and professional debut on 28 August 2015. He was promoted from the Geylang Prime League Squad to the Senior squad in 2015 before moving to Hougang United in 2016.

=== Hougang United ===
After being released by the Eagles, he joined the Hougang's revolution.

=== Balestier Khalsa ===
On 23 January, it was announced that he had signed for Balestier Khalsa for 2017 season, joining Raihan Rahman from Hougang United

=== Tampines Rovers ===
On 8 June 2021, Huzaifah returned to Tampines Rovers after successfully recovering from his injury.

=== Geylang International ===
On 7 November 2021, it was announced that he had returned to the Eagles for the 2022 season.

=== Hougang United ===
On 25 July 2025, Huzaifah re-joined Hougang United to bolster the club’s midfield for the 2025/26 season. On 12 April 2026, Huzaifah scored his first goal for the cheetahs since his return against the league giants Lion City Sailors with a rocket from 40 yards out which could be a goal of the season contender.

== International career ==
Huzaifah was first called up to the Singapore side in 2018 for the friendlies against Mongolia and Cambodia on 12 October and 16 October 2018 respectively. He made his international debut against Mongolia, replacing Hariss Harun in the 90th minute.

After 4 years since his last international appearances, Huzaifah was called up to the Singapore side in March 2023 for the friendly match against Hong Kong and Macau in which he played in both game.

== Career statistics ==
=== Club ===
As of match played 19 Aug 2022. Caps and goals may not be correct.

Club	Season	S.League		Singapore Cup		Singapore League Cup		Asia		Total	
Club	Season	Apps	Goals	Apps	Goals	Apps	Goals	Apps	Goals	Apps	Goals
Geylang International	2014	3	0	0	0	0	0	—		3	0
Geylang International	2015	11	0	0	0	2	0	—		13	0
Geylang International	Total	14	0	0	0	2	0	0	0	16	0
Hougang United	2016	16	0	0	0	3	0	—		19	0
Hougang United	Total	16	0	0	0	3	0	0	0	19	0
Balestier Khalsa	2017	20	2	1	0	3	0	—		24	2
Balestier Khalsa	2018	21	4	5	1	0	0	—		26	5
Balestier Khalsa	2019	20	2	0	0	0	0	—		20	2
Balestier Khalsa	Total	61	8	6	1	3	0	0	0	70	9
Tampines Rovers	2020	7	0	0	0	0	0	2	0	9	0
Tampines Rovers	2021	1	0	0	0	0	0	4	0	5	0
Tampines Rovers	Total	8	0	0	0	0	0	6	0	14	0
Geylang International	2022	23	0	2	0	0	0	0	0	25	0
Geylang International	2023	10	0	0	0	0	0	0	0	10	0
Geylang International	2024–25	0	0	0	0	0	0	0	0	0	0
Geylang International	Total	33	0	2	0	0	0	0	0	35	0
Career Total		132	8	8	1	8	0	6	0	152	9

== International statistics ==
International caps

No	Date	Venue	Opponent	Result	Competition
1	12 October 2018	Bishan Stadium, Bishan, Singapore	Mongolia	2–0 (won)	Friendly
2	16 October 2018	Phnom Penh Olympic Stadium, Phnom Penh, Cambodia	Cambodia	2–1 (won)	Friendly
3	20 March 2019	Bukit Jalil National Stadium, Kuala Lumpur, Malaysia	Malaysia	1–0 (won)	Friendly
4	11 June 2019	Singapore Sports Hub, Kallang, Singapore	Myanmar	1–2 (lost)	Friendly
5	23 March 2023	Mong Kok Stadium, Hong Kong	Hong Kong	1–1	Friendly
6	26 March 2023	Macau Olympic Complex Stadium, Macau	Macau	1–0	Friendly

Statistics accurate as of match played 12 October 2018

== Honours ==
=== Individual ===
- S.League Goal of the Year: 2017
- Singapore Premier League Goal of the Year: 2025–26
