= Hazzuwan Halim =

Singaporean footballer

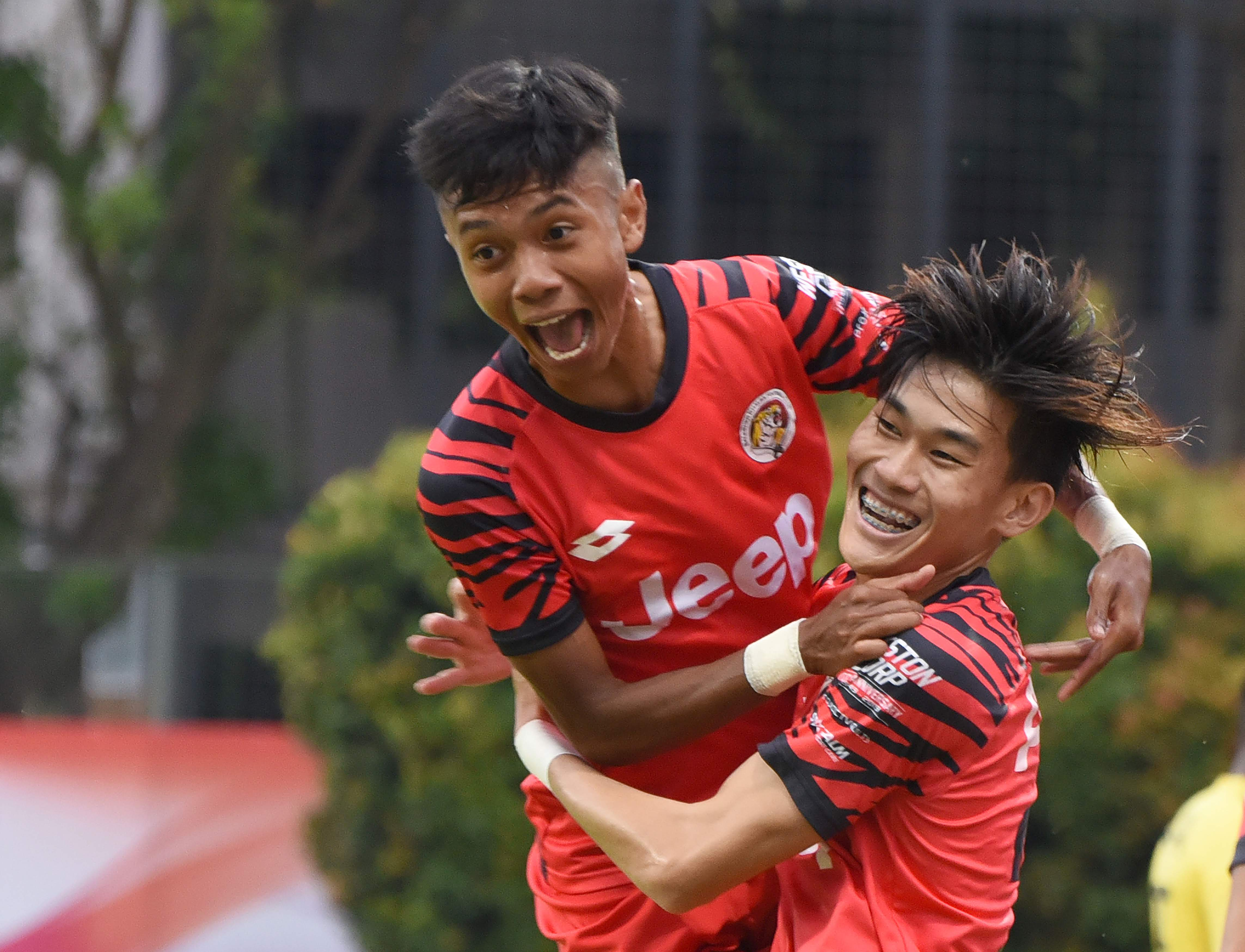
- Hazzuwan (on the left side) playing for Balestier Khalsa in 2020

Personal information
- Full name: Mohammad Hazzuwan bin Mohammad Halim
- Date of birth: 2 February 1994 (age 32)
- Place of birth: Singapore
- Height: 1.70 m (5 ft 7 in)
- Positions: Winger; striker; attacking midfielder

Team information
- Current team: Hougang United
- Number: 7

Senior career*
| Years | Team | Apps | (Gls) |
| 2012–2013 | Tanjong Pagar United | 3 | (0) |
| 2014–2021 | Baletier Khalsa | 140 | (29) |
| 2022 | Geylang International | 26 | (5) |
| 2023– | Hougang United | 19 | (4) |

International career^{‡}
| 2019– | Singapore | 6 | (0) |
- * Club domestic league appearances and goals as of 20 Jan 2023 ‡ National team caps and goals as of 20 Jan 2023

Mohammad Hazzuwan bin Mohammad Halim (born 2 February 1994) is a Singaporean professional footballer who plays primarily as a winger for Singapore Premier League club Hougang United and the Singapore national team. He is known for his pace and dribbling abilities. Mainly a winger, he can also be deployed as striker or attacking-midfielder.

== Club career ==
=== Tanjong Pagar United ===
Hazzuwan signed for Tanjong Pagar United in 2012 for the 2012 S.League season. He stayed with the club until 2013 but made only 3 appearances for the club.

=== Balestier Khalsa ===
He signed for Balestier Khalsa in 2014. He was awarded the "Young Player award" at the S-League's annual awards with tough competition from Home United's Irfan Fandi, the Young Lions' Singapore Hami Syahin and Albirex's Yasutaka Yanagi.

=== Geylang International ===
On 12 November 2021, Hazzuwan signed for Singapore Premier League side Geylang International. He made 26 appearances and contributed to his tenure at Geylang International with 5 goals and 2 assists.

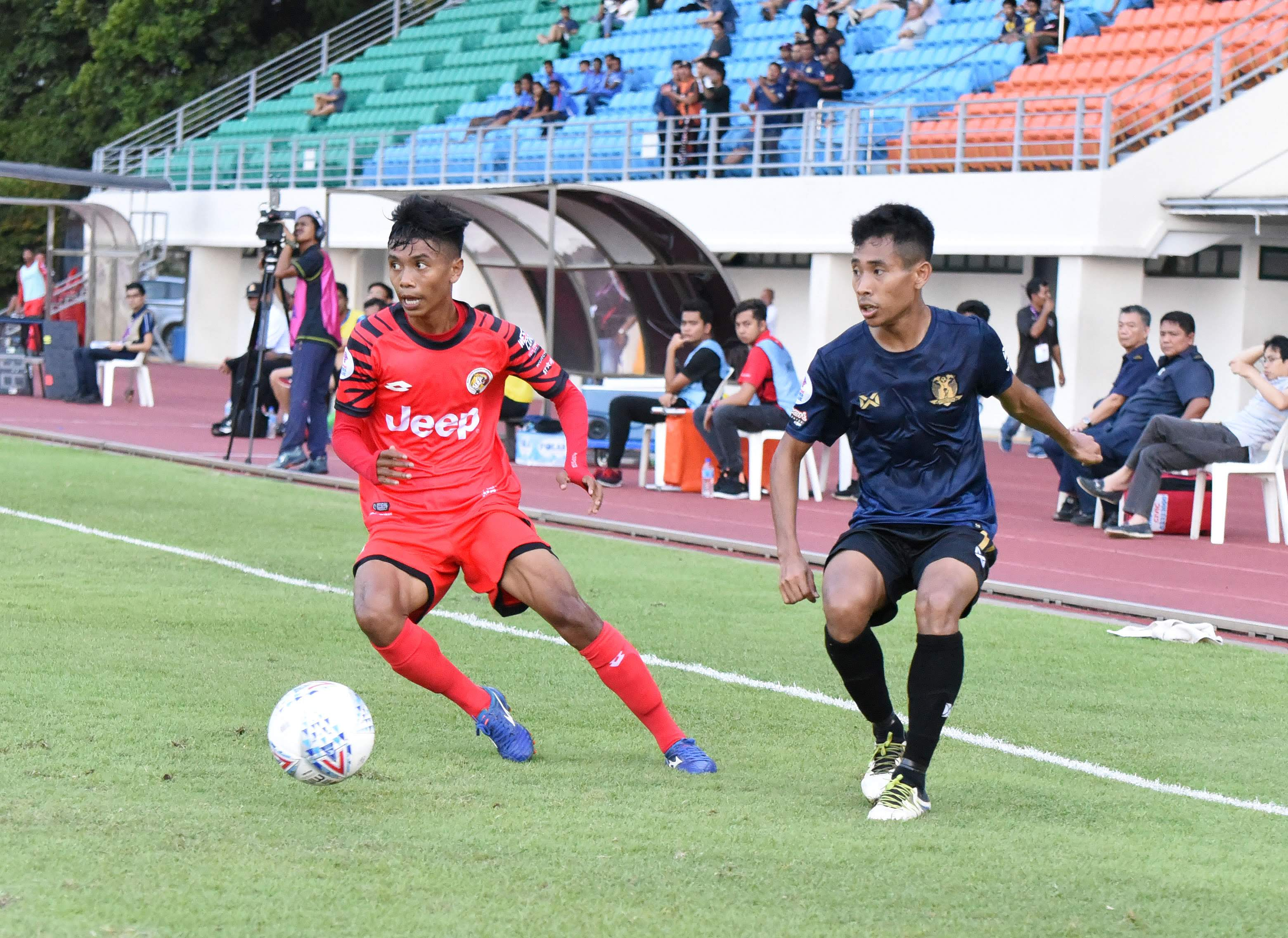
Hazzuwan Halim in action for Balestier Khalsa against Hougang United in the 2019 Singapore Premier League on 9 March 2019 at the Bishan Stadium.

=== Hougang United ===
On 23 January 2023, Hougang United announced their 5th signing, Hazzuwan, for the 2023 Singapore Premier League season.

== International career ==
Hazzuwan was first called up to the Singapore national team in 2019, for the 2022 FIFA World Cup qualifiers against Yemen and Palestine on 5 September and 10 September, respectively. He made his debut against Jordan, replacing Yasir Hanapi in the 67th minute.

Hazzuwan was also included in the 2022 VFF Tri-Nations Series tournament against Vietnam and India on 21 and 24 September.

== Career statistics ==
=== Club ===
As of match played 9 Oct 2022. Caps and goals may not be correct.

| Club | Season | S.League | | Singapore Cup | | Singapore League Cup | | Asia | | Total | |
| Club | Season | Apps | Goals | Apps | Goals | Apps | Goals | Apps | Goals | Apps | Goals |
|---|---|---|---|---|---|---|---|---|---|---|---|
| Tanjong Pagar | 2012 | 1 | 0 | 0 | 0 | 0 | 0 | — | | 1 | 0 |
| Tanjong Pagar | 2013 | 2 | 0 | 0 | 0 | 0 | 0 | — | | 2 | 0 |
| Tanjong Pagar | Total | 3 | 0 | 0 | 0 | 0 | 0 | 0 | 0 | 3 | 0 |
| Balestier Khalsa | 2015 | 16 | 0 | 1 | 0 | 3 | 0 | — | | 20 | 0 |
| Balestier Khalsa | 2016 | 17 | 1 | 3 | 0 | 1 | 0 | 5 | 0 | 26 | 1 |
| Balestier Khalsa | 2017 | 24 | 5 | 1 | 2 | 3 | 1 | — | | 28 | 8 |
| Balestier Khalsa | 2018 | 23 | 4 | 5 | 3 | 0 | 0 | — | | 28 | 7 |
| Balestier Khalsa | 2019 | 18 | 10 | 1 | 0 | 0 | 0 | — | | 19 | 10 |
| Balestier Khalsa | 2020 | 14 | 3 | 0 | 0 | 0 | 0 | — | | 14 | 3 |
| Balestier Khalsa | 2021 | 20 | 3 | 0 | 0 | 0 | 0 | 0 | 0 | 20 | 3 |
| Balestier Khalsa | Total | 132 | 26 | 11 | 5 | 7 | 1 | 5 | 0 | 155 | 32 |
| Geylang International | 2022 | 27 | 5 | 3 | 2 | 0 | 0 | 0 | 0 | 30 | 7 |
| Hougang United | 2023 | 19 | 4 | 5 | 0 | 1 | 0 | 5 | 0 | 19 | 4 |
| Hougang United | 2024–25 | 8 | 2 | 0 | 0 | 0 | 0 | 0 | 0 | 8 | 2 |
| Hougang United | Total | 27 | 6 | 5 | 0 | 1 | 0 | 5 | 0 | 27 | 6 |
| Career total | | 168 | 33 | 11 | 5 | 7 | 1 | 5 | 0 | 192 | 39 |

== International statistics ==
=== International caps ===
| No | Date | Venue | Opponent | Result | Competition |
|---|---|---|---|---|---|
| 1 | 5 October 2019 | Amman International Stadium, Amman, Jordan | Jordan | 0–0 (draw) | Friendly |
| 2 | 14 November 2019 | Abdullah bin Khalifa Stadium, Doha, Qatar | Qatar | 0–2 (lost) | Friendly |
| 3 | 19 November 2019 | Sheikh Ali Bin Mohammed Al-Khalifa Stadium, Muharraq, Bahrain | Yemen | 2–1 (won) | 2022 FIFA World Cup qualification – AFC second round |
| 4 | 21 Sept 2022 | Thống Nhất Stadium, Ho Chi Minh City, Vietnam | Vietnam | 0-4 (lost) | 2022 VFF Tri-Nations Series |
| 5 | 24 Sept 2022 | Thống Nhất Stadium, Ho Chi Minh City, Vietnam | India | 1-1 (draw) | 2022 VFF Tri-Nations Series |

As of match played 6 October 2019. Appearances and goals by national team and year

Singapore National Team
| Year | Apps | Goals |
|---|---|---|
| 2019 | 3 | 0 |
| 2021 | 1 | 0 |
| 2022 | 2 | 0 |
| Total | 6 | 0 |

== Honours ==
=== Club ===
==== Hougang United ====
- Singapore Cup Runner-ups (1): 2023

=== Individual ===
- S.League Young Player of the Year: 2017
