= 2019 Hougang United FC season =

Hougang United
2019 season
- Chairman: Bill Ng
- Head coach: Clement Teo
- Stadium: Jalan Besar Stadium
- S.League: 3rd
- Singapore Cup: Group Stage
| Home colours | Away colours |

The 2019 season was Hougang United's 22nd consecutive season in the top flight of Singapore football and in the S.League. Along with the S.League, the club will also compete in the Singapore Cup.

== Squad ==
=== S.League Squad ===
| No. | Name | Nationality | Date of birth (age) | Previous club | Contract since | Contract end |
Goalkeepers
| 1 | Heng How Meng ^{U23} | (Singapore) | | (Singapore) Tiong Bahru FC (NFL) | 2019 | |
| 13 | Ridhuan Barudin ^{>30} | (Singapore) | 23 March 1987 (age 39) | (Singapore) Tampines Rovers | 2015 | 2019 |
| 18 | Khairulhin Khalid | (Singapore) | 18 July 1991 (age 35) | (Singapore) LionsXII | 2016 | 2019 |
Defenders
| 2 | Alif Iskandar ^{U23} | (Singapore) | | (Singapore) NFA U18 | 2019 | 2019 |
| 3 | Afiq Yunos | (Singapore) | 10 December 1990 (age 35) | (Singapore) Geylang International | 2019 | |
| 5 | Kong Ho-won ^{U23} | (South Korea) | 4 September 1997 (age 29) | (South Korea) Chung-Ang University | 2019 | |
| 8 | Hafiz Sujad | (Singapore) | 1 November 1990 (age 36) | (Singapore) Tampines Rovers | 2019 | |
| 11 | Nazrul Nazari | (Singapore) | 11 February 1991 (age 35) | (Singapore) LionsXII | 2016 | 2019 |
| 12 | Fabian Kwok | (Singapore) | 17 March 1989 (age 37) | (Singapore) Tampines Rovers | 2017 | 2019 |
| 15 | Jordan Nicolas Vestering ^{U23} | (Singapore) (Netherlands) | 25 September 2000 (age 26) | (Singapore) NFA U18 | 2018 | 2019 |
| 16 | Justin Hui ^{U23} | (Singapore) | 17 February 1998 (age 28) | Youth Team | 2017 | 2019 |
| 17 | Faiz Salleh | (Singapore) | 17 July 1992 (age 34) | (Singapore) Young Lions FC | 2014 | 2019 |
| 20 | Muhaimin Suhaimi | (Singapore) | 20 February 1995 (age 31) | (Singapore) Young Lions FC | 2018 | 2019 |
| 27 | Azhar Manap ^{U23} | (Singapore) | 22 July 1999 (age 27) | | 2019 | 2019 |
Midfielders
| 4 | Afiq Noor | (Singapore) | 25 December 1993 (age 32) | (Singapore) Tiong Bahru FC (NFL) | 2019 | 2019 |
| 6 | Anumanthan Kumar | (Singapore) | 14 July 1994 (age 32) | (Singapore) Home United | 2019 | 2019 |
| 7 | Shahfiq Ghani | (Singapore) | 17 March 1992 (age 34) | (Singapore) Geylang International | 2018 | 2019 |
| 21 | Nikesh Singh Sidhu ^{U23} | (Singapore) | 24 February 1999 (age 27) | Youth Team | 2019 | 2019 |
| 22 | Mahathir Azeman ^{U23} | (Singapore) | 17 January 1996 (age 30) | (Singapore) Balestier Khalsa | 2019 | 2019 |
| 23 | Zulfahmi Arifin | (Singapore) | 5 October 1991 (age 35) | (Thailand) Chonburi F.C. | 2019 | |
| 24 | Amir Zalani ^{U23} | (Singapore) | 4 December 1996 (age 29) | (Singapore) Home United | 2017 | 2019 |
| 25 | Timothy David Yeo ^{U23} | (Singapore) | 19 October 2000 (age 26) | (Singapore) NFA U18 | 2019 | 2019 |
| 28 | Karthik Raj ^{U23} | (Singapore) | 1 August 1997 (age 29) | | 2019 | 2019 |
Strikers
| 9 | Stipe Plazibat | (Croatia) | 31 August 1989 (age 37) | (Croatia) NK Solin | 2019 | 2019 |
| 10 | Fazrul Nawaz | (Singapore) | 17 April 1985 (age 41) | (Singapore) Tampines Rovers | 2018 | 2019 |
| 14 | Iqbal Hussain | (Singapore) | 6 June 1993 (age 33) | (Singapore) Young Lions FC | 2016 | 2019 |
| 19 | Faris Ramli | (Singapore) | 24 August 1992 (age 34) | (Malaysia) Perlis Northern Lions F.C. | 2019 | 2019 |
| 26 | Paulin Mbaye ^{U23} | (France) | | (Singapore) SCC Firsts (Cosmo League) | 2019 | |

== Coaching staff ==
| Position | Name | Ref. |
|---|---|---|
| Head Coach | (Singapore) Clement Teo | |
| Assistant Coach | (Singapore) Salim Moin | |
| Head of Youth (COE) | (Singapore) Robin Chitrakar | |
| Goalkeeping Coach | (Singapore) Lim Queen Cher | |
| General Manager | (Singapore) Matthew Tay | |
| Team Manager | (Singapore) Clement Teo | |
| Sports Trainer | (Singapore) Thomas Pang | |
| Sports Trainer | (Singapore) Ryan Wang | |
| Kitman | (Singapore) Wan Azlan | |

== Transfers ==
=== Pre-season transfers ===
==== ln ====
| Position | Player | Transferred from | Ref |
|---|---|---|---|
| GK | (Singapore) Heng How Meng | (Singapore) Tiong Bahru FC (NFL) | |
| DF | (Singapore) Afiq Yunos | (Singapore) Tampines Rovers | Undisclosed |
| DF | (Singapore) Hafiz Abu Sujad | (Singapore) Tampines Rovers | Free |
| DF | (Singapore) Zulfahmi Arifin | (Thailand) Chonburi F.C. | Free |
| DF | (Singapore) Alif Iskandar | (Singapore) NFA U18 | |
| DF | (Singapore) Ariyan Shamsuddin | (Singapore) Garena Young Lions | Loan Return |
| DF | (South Korea) Kong Ho-won | (South Korea) Chung-Ang University | |
| MF | (Singapore) Afiq Noor | (Singapore) Tiong Bahru FC (NFL) | |
| MF | (Singapore) Mahathir Azeman | Free Agent | |
| MF | (Singapore) Anumanthan Kumar | (Singapore) Home United | End of NS |
| MF | (Singapore) Timothy David Yeo | (Singapore) NFA U18 | |
| FW | (Singapore) Fazrul Nawaz | (Singapore) Tampines Rovers | $50,000. 2 Years contract till 2019 |
| FW | (Croatia) Stipe Plazibat | (Croatia) NK Solin | |
| FW | (Brazil) Rafael Ramazotti | (Malaysia) PKNS FC | Free |
| FW | (Singapore) Faris Ramli | (Malaysia) Perlis Northern Lions F.C. | Free |

Note 1: Fazrul Nawaz returned to the team after the loan and subsequently complete the transfer.

Note 2: Ariyan Shamsuddin returned to the team after being loaned to Garena Young Lions in 2018. However, he was released for the season.

Note 3: Rafael Ramazotti was initially signed but left the club without paying off compensation to sign for Mexican club.

==== Out ====
| Position | Player | Transferred To | Ref |
|---|---|---|---|
| GK | (Singapore) Zulfairuuz Rudy | (Singapore) Tampines Rovers | |
| DF | (Singapore) Gerald Ting | | |
| DF | (Singapore) Asraf Zahid | (Singapore) Garena Young Lions | Free |
| DF | (Singapore) Ashrul Syafeeq | | |
| DF | (Singapore) Syaqir Sulaiman | (Singapore) GFA Sporting Westlake (NFL D1) | |
| DF | (Singapore) Ariyan Shamsuddin | (Singapore) SAFSA (NFL D1) | Free |
| DF | (Singapore) Illyas Lee | (Singapore) Balestier Khalsa | |
| MF | (Singapore) Jordan Chan | (Singapore) Balestier Khalsa | |
| MF | (Singapore) Nurhilmi Jasni | (Singapore) Tiong Bahru FC (NFL D1) | Free |
| MF | (Singapore) Stanely Ng | | |
| MF | (Singapore) Syahiran Miswan | (Singapore) Geylang International | |
| FW | (Singapore) Fazrul Nawaz | (Singapore) Tampines Rovers | Loan Return |
| FW | (Italy) (France) Antonie Viterale | (Switzerland) FC Lugano | Free |
| FW | (South Korea) Jang Jo-yoon | Retired | |
| FW | (Singapore) Daniel Goh Ji Xiong | (Singapore) Balestier Khalsa | Free |
| FW | (Singapore) Fareez Farhan | (Singapore) Geylang International | Free |
| FW | (Singapore) Syukri Bashir | (Singapore) Garena Young Lions | Free |
| FW | (Singapore) Idraki Adnan | (Singapore) SAFSA (NS) | |
| FW | (Brazil) Rafael Ramazotti | (Mexico) FC Juarez | Vacated Apartment |

==== Retained ====
| Position | Player | Ref |
|---|---|---|
| GK | (Singapore) Khairulhin Khalid | 2 Years contract signed in 2018 |
| MF | (Singapore) Muhaimin Suhaimi | 2 Years contract signed in 2018 |
| FW | (Singapore) Shahfiq Ghani | 2 Years contract signed in 2018 |
| FW | (Singapore) Iqbal Hussain | 2 Years contract signed in 2018 |

==== Extension ====
| Position | Player | Ref |
|---|---|---|
| GK | (Singapore) Ridhuan Barudin | |
| DF | (Singapore) Faiz Salleh | |
| MF | (Singapore) Amir Zalani | |
| MF | (Singapore) Fabian Kwok | |
| MF | (Singapore) Justin Hui | |

==== Promoted ====
| Position | Player | Ref |
|---|---|---|
| MF | (Singapore) Nikesh Singh Sidhu | |
| FW | (Singapore) Idraki Adnan | |

Note 1: Idraki Adnan was signed to the 2019 season but subsequently released.

==== Trial ====
| Position | Player | Trial @ | Ref |
|---|---|---|---|
| FW | (Singapore) Fareez Farhan | (Thailand) Chainat Hornbill F.C. | |
| FW | (Singapore) Iqbal Hussain | (Thailand) Chainat Hornbill F.C. | |

=== Mid-season transfer ===
==== In ====
| Position | Player | Transferred From | Ref |
|---|---|---|---|
| FW | (France) Pauline Mbaye | (Singapore) SCC First (Cosmo League) | |
| MF | (Singapore) Azhar Manap | Free Agent | |
| MF | (Singapore) Karthik Raj | Free Agent | |

== Friendlies ==
=== Pre-Season Friendly ===
Win Draw Loss

| 23 January 2019 1 | Jungfrau Punggol FC (Singapore) (NFL) | 0–6 | (Singapore) Hougang United | Jalan Besar Stadium |

| 2 February 2019 2 | Albirex Niigata (S) (Singapore) | 2–0 | (Singapore) Hougang United | Jalan Besar Stadium |
| | Hiroyoshi Kamata 44'; Daizo Horikoshi 86' |

| 7 February 2019 3 | Albirex Niigata (S) (Singapore) | 0–6 | (Singapore) Hougang United | Hougang Stadium |

| 10 February 2019 4 | Tiong Bahru FC (Singapore) (NFL) | 3–5 | (Singapore) Hougang United | Hougang Stadium |

Tour of Cambodia – 12 to 16 February

| 12 February 2019 1 | Nagaworld FC (Cambodia) | 1–1 | (Singapore) Hougang United | Phnom Penh |
| | | | Amir Zailani | Stadium: Phnom Penh Olympic Stadium |

| 14 February 2019 2 | Phnom Penh Crown FC (Cambodia) | 2–2 | (Singapore) Hougang United | Phnom Penh |
| | Darlan Martins 11'; Va Sokthorn 19' | | (o.g.); Amir Zailani | Stadium: RSN Stadium |

| 16 February 2019 3 | Boeung Ket Angkor FC (Cambodia) | 4–2 | (Singapore) Hougang United | Phnom Penh |
| | Julius Oiboh; Samuel Ajayi; Soeuth Nava | | Afiq Noor 27'; Faris Ramli | Stadium: RSN Stadium |

=== Mid-Season Friendly ===
Win Draw Loss

| 12 June 2019 1 | Project Vaults Oxley SC (Singapore) (NFL) | 0–5 | (Singapore) Hougang United | Hougang Stadium |
| | | | Faiz Salleh 10'; Hafiz Sujad 33'; Fazrul Nawaz 60'; Pauline Mbaye 65'; Nor Hakim 84' |

== Team statistics ==
=== Appearances and goals ===
As of 29 September 2018.

| No. | Pos. | Player | Sleague | | Singapore Cup | | Total | |
| No. | Pos. | Player | Apps. | Goals | Apps. | Goals | Apps. | Goals |
|---|---|---|---|---|---|---|---|---|
| 1 | GK | (Singapore) Heng How Meng | 1 | 0 | 0 | 0 | 1 | 0 |
| 2 | DF | (Singapore) Alif Iskandar | 5 | 0 | 0 | 0 | 5 | 0 |
| 3 | DF | (Singapore) Afiq Yunos | 19 | 2 | 2 | 0 | 21 | 2 |
| 4 | MF | (Singapore) Afiq Noor | 14(3) | 0 | 3 | 0 | 20 | 0 |
| 5 | DF | (South Korea) Kong Ho-won | 21 | 1 | 3 | 1 | 24 | 2 |
| 6 | MF | (Singapore) Anumanthan Kumar | 10(6) | 1 | 1 | 0 | 17 | 1 |
| 7 | MF | (Singapore) Shahfiq Ghani | 1(9) | 8 | 0(2) | 0 | 12 | 8 |
| 8 | DF | (Singapore) Hafiz Sujad | 10(9) | 2 | 0(2) | 0 | 21 | 2 |
| 9 | FW | (Croatia) Stipe Plazibat | 20(1) | 9 | 2 | 0 | 23 | 9 |
| 10 | FW | (Singapore) Fazrul Nawaz | 5(8) | 5 | 0(2) | 0 | 15 | 5 |
| 11 | DF | (Singapore) Nazrul Nazari | 13(3) | 2 | 3 | 0 | 19 | 2 |
| 12 | DF | (Singapore) Fabian Kwok | 10(7) | 2 | 0 | 0 | 17 | 2 |
| 13 | GK | (Singapore) Ridhuan Barudin | 17 | 0 | 1 | 0 | 18 | 0 |
| 14 | FW | (Singapore) Iqbal Hussain | 1(11) | 1 | 0(2) | 0 | 14 | 1 |
| 15 | DF | (Singapore) Jordan Nicolas Vestering | 15 | 1 | 3 | 0 | 18 | 1 |
| 16 | DF | (Singapore) Justin Hui | 1 | 0 | 0 | 0 | 1 | 0 |
| 17 | DF | (Singapore) Faiz Salleh | 0(2) | 0 | 1 | 0 | 3 | 0 |
| 18 | GK | (Singapore) Khairulhin Khalid | 5 | 0 | 2 | 0 | 7 | 0 |
| 19 | FW | (Singapore) Faris Ramli | 21(3) | 16 | 3 | 1 | 27 | 17 |
| 20 | DF | (Singapore) Muhaimin Suhaimi | 4(5) | 0 | 0(1) | 0 | 10 | 0 |
| 21 | MF | (Singapore) Nikesh Singh Sidhu | 18 | 1 | 3 | 0 | 21 | 1 |
| 22 | MF | (Singapore) Mahathir Azeman | 5 | 2 | 0 | 0 | 5 | 2 |
| 23 | MF | (Singapore) Zulfahmi Arifin | 19(1) | 1 | 3 | 0 | 23 | 1 |
| 24 | MF | (Singapore) Amir Zalani | 12 | 3 | 0 | 0 | 12 | 3 |
| 25 | MF | (Singapore) Timothy David Yeo | 5 | 0 | 0 | 0 | 5 | 0 |
| 26 | FW | (France) Paulin Mbaye | 1 | 0 | 0 | 0 | 1 | 0 |
| 43 | MF | (Singapore) Farhan Zulkifli | 9 | 1 | 3 | 0 | 12 | 1 |
| 44 | MF | (Singapore) Nor Hakim | 1 | 0 | 0 | 0 | 1 | 0 |

Note 1: Zulfahmi Arifin scored an own goal against Tampines Rovers on 3/3/2019.

== Competitions ==
=== Overview ===
| Competition | Record | | | | | | | |
| Competition | P | W | D | L | GF | GA | GD | Win % |
|---|---|---|---|---|---|---|---|---|
| Singapore Premier League | 24 | 13 | 4 | 7 | 58 | 45 | +13 | 54.17 |
| Singapore Cup | 3 | 1 | 0 | 2 | 2 | 4 | −2 | 33.33 |
| Total | 27 | 14 | 4 | 9 | 60 | 49 | +11 | 51.85 |

=== Singapore Premier League ===
Win Draw Loss

| 3 March 2019 1 | Hougang United (Singapore) | 1–5 | (Singapore) Tampines Rovers | Jalan Besar Stadium |
| | Faris Ramli 54' (pen.); Iqbal Hussain (yellow card) 45'; Justin Hui (yellow card) 46' (yellow-red card) 53'; Fabian Kwok (yellow card) 47'; Nazrul Nazari (yellow card) 83' | | Irwan Shah 45' (yellow card) 36'; Ryutaro Megumi 64'; Zulfahmi Arifin 71' (o.g.); Zehrudin Mehmedović 75'; Jordan Webb 93' (yellow card) 47'; Shahdan Sulaiman (penalty missed) 84; Shah Shahiran (yellow card) 35'; Taufik Suparno (yellow card) 59' | Referee: G. Letchman |

| 9 March 2019 2 | Balestier Khalsa (Singapore) | 0–1 | (Singapore) Hougang United | Bishan Stadium |
| | Kristijan Krajcek (yellow card) 42'; Huzaifah Aziz (yellow card) 45'; Illyas Lee (yellow card) 61'; Nurullah Hussein (yellow card) 78' | | Faris Ramli 60'; Afiq Noor (yellow card) 18' | Referee: Ahmad A'Qashah |

| 16 March 2019 3 | Hougang United (Singapore) | 5–1 | (Singapore) Warriors FC | Jalan Besar Stadium |
| | Stipe Plazibat 12' (pen.) 14'; Faris Ramli 37'; Amir Zalani 42' (yellow card) 55'; Fazrul Nawaz 78'; Zulfahmi Arifin (yellow card) 71' | | Fairoz Hassan 94'; Poh Yi Feng (yellow card) 15'; Sahil Suhaimi (yellow card) 64' | Referee: Lim Liang Yi |

| 31 March 2019 4 | Young Lions FC (Singapore) | 2–1 | (Singapore) Hougang United | Jalan Besar Stadium |
| | Syukri Bashir 33'; Saifullah Akbar 70'; Zulqarnaen Suzliman (yellow card) 45' | | Afiq Yunos 58'; Zulfahmi Arifin (yellow card) 64'; Gong Ho-won (red card) 72' | Referee: Farhan Mohamed |

| 12 April 2019 5 | Hougang United (Singapore) | 1–0 | (Singapore) Home United | Jalan Besar Stadium |
| | Faris Ramli 83' (pen.); Fabian Kwok (yellow card) 64'; Fazrul Nawaz (yellow card) 90' | | Aqhari Abdullah (yellow card) 63'; Hami Syahin (yellow card) 65'; Ho Wai Loon (yellow card) 81' | Referee: G. Letchman |

| 20 April 2019 6 | Hougang United (Singapore) | 4–1 | (Singapore) Geylang International | Jalan Besar Stadium |
| | Jordan Nicolas Vestering 7' (yellow card) 43'; Amir Zalani 54'; Afiq Yunos 67'; Fazrul Nawaz 83' (yellow card) 90'; Afiq Noor (yellow card) 51' | | Barry Maguire 49'; Darren Teh (yellow card) 18' | Referee: Muhammad Zulfiqar |

| 24 April 2019 7 | Hougang United (Singapore) | 4–2 | (Singapore) Albirex Niigata (S) | Jalan Besar Stadium |
| | Faris Ramli 9', 28'; Nikesh Singh Sidhu 56'; Shahfiq Ghani 70' | | Daizo Horikoshi 67'; Yoshikatsu Hiraga 90+2' | Referee: Muhammad Zulfiqar |

| 28 April 2019 8 | Brunei DPMM | 3–2 | (Singapore) Hougang United | Hassanal Bolkiah National Stadium |
| | Blake Ricciuto 20'; Andrei Varankow 65' (pen.); Hendra Azam Idris 90+4'; Charlie Clough (yellow card) 88' | | Stipe Plazibat 53' 55' (pen.); Jordan Nicolas Vestering (yellow card) 33'; Hafiz Abu Sujad (yellow card) 62'; Muhaimin Suhaimi (yellow card) 90+2' |

| 5 May 2019 9 | Tampines Rovers (Singapore) | 3–3 | (Singapore) Hougang United | Our Tampines Hub |
| | Shah Shahiran 57'; Zehrudin Mehmedović 66'; Khairul Amri 70'; Yasir Hanapi (yellow card) 19,51' (yellow-red card); Amirul Adli (yellow card) 85' | | Kong Ho-won 30'; Faris Ramli 56' 64'; Anumanthan Kumar (yellow card) 24'; Nikesh Singh Sidhu (yellow card) 64' | Referee: Ahmad A'Qashah |

| 12 May 2019 10 | Hougang United (Singapore) | 1–0 | (Singapore) Balestier Khalsa | Jalan Besar Stadium |
| | Faris Ramli (penalty missed) 45; Anumanthan Kumar 84' (yellow card) 74'; Jordan Nicolas Vestering (yellow card) 33'; Stipe Plazibat (yellow card) 49'; Muhaimin Suhaimi (yellow card) 63,81' (yellow-red card) | | Huzaifah Aziz (yellow card) 19'; Nurullah Hussein (yellow card) 45'; Sime Zuzul (yellow card) 47'; Illyas Lee (yellow card) 50' | Referee: Muhammad Zulfiqar |

| 25 May 2019 11 | Warriors FC (Singapore) | 3–2 | (Singapore) Hougang United | Jurong East Stadium |
| | Gabriel Quak 8'; Jonathan Béhé 52' 86'; Delwinder Singh (yellow card) 90' | | Amir Zailani 38'; Hafiz Sujad 76'; Anumanthan Kumar (yellow card) 14,89' (yellow-red card) | Referee: Nathan Chan |

| 29 June 2019 12 | Home United (Singapore) | 0–2 | (Singapore) Hougang United | Bishan Stadium |
| | Aqhari Abdullah (yellow card) 18'; Hafiz Nor (yellow card) 52'; Shahril Ishak (red card) 52'; Hami Syahin (yellow card) 65' | | Farhan Zulkifli 11'; Fazrul Nawaz 78'; Amir Zailani (yellow card) 38'; Nazrul Nazari (yellow card) 62' | Referee: Jansen Foo |

| 5 July 2019 13 | Geylang International (Singapore) | 2–2 | (Singapore) Hougang United | Our Tampines Hub |
| | Fareez Farhan 3' 38' | | Fazrul Nawaz 14'; Hafiz Sujad 63' | Referee: Ahmad A'Qashah |

| 10 July 2019 14 | Hougang United (Singapore) | 0–1 | (Singapore) Young Lions FC | Jalan Besar Stadium |
| | Lionel Tan (yellow card) 26'; Hafiz Sujad (yellow card) 45'; Fabian Kwok (yellow card) 47' | | Jacob Mahler 72'; Irfan Najeeb (yellow card) 51'; Zulqarnaen Suzliman (yellow card) 90' | Referee: Lim Liang Yi |

| 13 July 2019 15 | Albirex Niigata (S) (Singapore) | 1–2 | (Singapore) Hougang United | Jurong East Stadium |
| | Zamani Zamri 53'; Kyoga Nakamura (yellow card) 71' | | Stipe Plazibat 25' 31'; Nikesh Singh Sidhu (yellow card) 5'; Timothy David Yeo (yellow card) 29'; Ridhuan Barudin (yellow card) 86' | Referee: Farhan Mohd |

| 19 July 2019 16 | Hougang United (Singapore) | 3–1 | Brunei DPMM | Jalan Besar Stadium |
| | Faris Ramli 6' (pen.); Zulfahmi Arifin 32'; Nazrul Nazari 78'; Afiq Noor (yellow card) 53' | | Blake Ricciuto 45+3'; Charlie Clough (yellow card) 71' | Referee: Nathan Chan |

| 27 July 2019 17 | Hougang United (Singapore) | 2–4 | (Singapore) Tampines Rovers | Jalan Besar Stadium |
| | Stipe Plazibat 57'; Fabian Kwok 79'; Zulfahmi Arifin (yellow card) 45'; Alif Iskandar (yellow card) 47'; Kong Ho-won (yellow card) 65'; Nazrul Nazari (yellow card) 65' | | Jordan Webb 45+1' (pen.) 75'; Yasir Hanapi 69'; Joel Chew 90+5' | Referee: Juherman Zaiton |

| 4 August 2019 18 | Balestier Khalsa (Singapore) | 3–4 | (Singapore) Hougang United | Bishan Stadium |
| | Fadli Kamis 14'; Hazzuwan Halim 36' 75'; Fariz Faizal (yellow card) 62' | | Stipe Plazibat 43'; Shahfiq Ghani 58' 66'; Faris Ramli 78'; Afiq Yunos (yellow card) 84' | Referee: Abirami Naidu |

| 13 August 2019 19 | Hougang United (Singapore) | 3–1 | (Singapore) Warriors FC | Jalan Besar Stadium |
| | Mahathir Azeman 12'; Stipe Plazibat 68'; Faris Ramli 90+2'; Nikesh Singh Sidhu (yellow card) 28'; Afiq Noor (yellow card) 38'; Jordan Nicolas Vestering (yellow card) 45'; Fabian Kwok (yellow card) 82' | | Suria Prakash 85'; R Aaravin (yellow card) 44'; Gabriel Quak (yellow card) 45' | Referee: Lim Liang Yi |

| 18 August 2019 20 | Young Lions FC (Singapore) | 2–4 | (Singapore) Hougang United | Jalan Besar Stadium |
| | Jacob Mahler 59', 89' | | Fabian Kwok 7'; Nazrul Nazari 23'; Faris Ramli 74'; Mahathir Azeman 82' | Referee: Muhammad Zulfiqar |

| 1 September 2019 21 | Hougang United (Singapore) | 2–0 | (Singapore) Home United | Jalan Besar Stadium |
| | Faris Ramli 74' (pen.); Iqbal Hussain 81' | | | Referee: Nathan Chan |

| 15 September 2019 22 | Geylang International (Singapore) | 4–4 | (Singapore) Hougang United | Our Tampines Hub |
| | Fareez Farhan 7' 11' 28'; Shawal Anuar 70' | | Shahfiq Ghani 41' 75'; Faris Ramli 49' 80' | Referee: Muhammad Taqi |

| 27 August 2019 23 (Rescheduled) | Hougang United (Singapore) | 1–1 | (Singapore) Albirex Niigata (S) | Jalan Besar Stadium |
| | Faris Ramli 40' | | Souta Sugiyama 20' | Referee: Juherman Zaiton |

| 29 September 2019 24 (Rescheduled) | Brunei DPMM | 5–4 | (Singapore) Hougang United | Hassanal Bolkiah National Stadium |
| | Andrei Varankou 7' 37'; Adi Said 60' 82'; Fakharrazi Hassan 88' | | Shahfiq Ghani 56' 63' 72' (pen.); Fazrul Nawaz 90+5' | Referee: Muhd Taqi |

| Pos | Team | Pld | W | D | L | GF | GA | GD | Pts | Qualification or relegation |
|---|---|---|---|---|---|---|---|---|---|---|
| 1 | DPMM (Note: The two foreign clubs – Albirex Niigata (S) and DPMM – as well as the Football Association of Singapore (FAS) under-21 team, Young Lions, are ineligible for any AFC competition spots.) (C) | 24 | 15 | 5 | 4 | 51 | 25 | +26 | 50 | |
| 2 | Tampines Rovers | 24 | 12 | 8 | 4 | 52 | 29 | +23 | 44 | Qualification for AFC Champions League preliminary round 1 |
| 3 | Hougang United | 24 | 13 | 4 | 7 | 58 | 45 | +13 | 43 | Qualification for AFC Cup group stage |
| 4 | Albirex Niigata (S) | 24 | 12 | 5 | 7 | 36 | 25 | +11 | 41 | |
| 5 | Geylang International | 24 | 10 | 3 | 11 | 41 | 48 | −7 | 33 | |

Source: Singapore Premier League
Rules for classification: 1) points; 2) goal difference; 3) number of goals scored; 4) number of wins
(C) Champions

=== Singapore Cup ===
Win Draw Loss

| 25 September 2019 Match 1 | Albirex Niigata (S) (Singapore) | 1–2 | (Singapore) Hougang United | Jurong East Stadium |
| | Daizo Horikoshi 29' | | Kong Ho-won 28'; Faris Ramli 90' (pen.) | Referee: G. Letchman |

| 19 October 2019 Match 2 | Brunei DPMM | 0–1 | (Singapore) Hougang United | Jalan Besar Stadium |
| | Andrei Varankou 82' | | | Referee: Jansen Foo |

| 23 October 2019 Match 3 | Hougang United (Singapore) | 0–2 | (Singapore) Geylang International | Jalan Besar Stadium |
| | | | Amy Recha 74'; Fareez Farhan 84' (pen.) | Referee: Juherman Zaiton |
