= 2020 Hougang United FC season =

Hougang United
2020 season
- Chairman: Bill Ng
- Stadium: Hougang Stadium
Home colours	Away colours

The 2020 season was Hougang United's 23rd consecutive season in the top flight of Singapore football and in the S.League. Along with the S.League, the club will also compete in the Singapore Cup. They will also compete in the 2020 AFC Cup, a first in their history.

== Squad ==
=== S.League Squad ===
No.	Name	Nationality	Date of birth (age)	Previous club	Contract since	Contract end
Goalkeepers
13	Ridhuan Barudin ^{>30}	(Singapore)	23 March 1987 (age 39)	(Singapore) Tampines Rovers	2015	2020
18	Khairulhin Khalid	(Singapore)	18 July 1991 (age 35)	(Singapore) LionsXII	2016	2020
31	Daniel Ong ^{>30}	(Singapore)	31 August 1989 (age 37)	(Singapore) Tiong Bahru FC	2020	2020
Defenders
2	Anders Aplin	(Singapore) (England)	21 June 1991 (age 35)	(Singapore) Geylang International	2020	2020
3	Maksat Dzhakybaliev ^{U21}	(Kyrgyzstan)	18 February 2000 (age 26)	(Turkey) Sivasspor U-21	2020	2020
5	Lionel Tan ^{U23}	(Singapore)	5 June 1997 (age 29)	(Singapore) SAFSA	2020	
8	Hafiz Sujad	(Singapore)	1 November 1990 (age 36)	(Singapore) Tampines Rovers	2019	2020
11	Nazrul Nazari	(Singapore)	11 February 1991 (age 35)	(Singapore) LionsXII	2016	2021
14	Alif Iskandar ^{U23}	(Singapore)	16 January 1999 (age 27)	(Singapore) NFA U18	2019	2020
17	Faiz Salleh	(Singapore)	17 July 1992 (age 34)	(Singapore) Young Lions FC	2014	2020
19	Zac Anderson	(Australia)	30 April 1991 (age 35)	(Malaysia) Perak FA	2020	2020
20	Muhaimin Suhaimi	(Singapore)	20 February 1995 (age 31)	(Singapore) Young Lions FC	2018	2021
28	Afiq Yunos	(Singapore)	10 December 1990 (age 35)	(Thailand) Trat F.C.	2019	
35	Emmeric Ong	(Singapore)	25 January 1991 (age 35)	(Singapore) Warriors FC	2020	
Midfielders
4	Afiq Noor	(Singapore)	25 December 1993 (age 32)	(Singapore) Tiong Bahru FC (NFL)	2019	2020
6	Anumanthan Kumar	(Singapore)	14 July 1994 (age 32)	(Singapore) Home United	2019	2020
12	Fabian Kwok ^{>30}	(Singapore)	17 March 1989 (age 37)	(Singapore) Tampines Rovers	2017	2020
16	Justin Hui ^{U23}	(Singapore)	17 February 1998 (age 28)	Youth Team	2017	2020
21	Nikesh Singh Sidhu ^{U23}	(Singapore)	24 February 1999 (age 27)	(Singapore) Home United U19	2019	2020
22	Mahathir Azeman	(Singapore)	17 January 1996 (age 30)	(Singapore) Balestier Khalsa	2019	2020
24	Farhan Zulkifli ^{U23}	(Singapore)	10 November 2002 (age 24)	(Singapore) Home United U19	2019	2020
25	Charlie Machell	(England)	25 October 1994 (age 32)	(Cambodia) Svay Rieng FC	2020	2020
Strikers
7	Shahfiq Ghani	(Singapore)	17 March 1992 (age 34)	(Singapore) Geylang International	2018	2021
10	Shawal Anuar	(Singapore)	29 April 1991 (age 35)	(Singapore) Geylang International	2020	2021
23	Sahil Suhaimi	(Singapore)	8 July 1992 (age 34)	(Singapore) Warriors FC	2020	2020
26	Daniel Martens ^{U23}	(Singapore)	25 February 1999 (age 27)	(Singapore) Albirex Niigata (S)	2020	2020
32	Naufal Azman ^{U23}	(Singapore)	10 July 1998 (age 28)	(Singapore) Young Lions FC	2020	2020
Players who left during the season
1	Heng How Meng ^{U23}	(Singapore)	14 May 1998 (age 28)	(Singapore) Tiong Bahru FC (NFL)	2019	
9	Stipe Plazibat	(Croatia)	31 August 1989 (age 37)	(Croatia) NK Solin	2019	2020
15	Jordan Nicolas Vestering ^{U23}	(Singapore) (Netherlands)	25 September 2000 (age 26)	(Singapore) NFA U18	2018	2020

== Coaching staff ==
Position	Name	Ref.
Head coach	(Singapore) Clement Teo	
Assistant coach	(Singapore) Salim Moin	
Assistant coach	(Singapore) Firdaus Kassim	
Head of Youth (COE)	(Singapore) Firdaus Kassim	
Fitness coach	(Singapore) Syaqir Sulaiman	
Goalkeeping coach	(Singapore) Lim Queen Cher	
General Manager	(Singapore) Matthew Tay	
Team Manager	(Singapore) Clement Teo	
Sports Trainer	(Singapore) Thomas Pang	
Sports Trainer	(Singapore) Ryan Wang	
Kitman	(Singapore) Wan Azlan	

== Transfers ==
=== Pre-season transfers ===
==== In ====
Position	Player	Transferred From	Ref
DF	(Kyrgyzstan) Maksat Dzhakybaliev	(Turkey) Sivasspor u-21	Season loan
DF	(Australia) Zac Anderson	Free Agent	1 year contract signed in 2020
DF	(Singapore) Anders Aplin	(Singapore) Geylang International	1 year contract signed in 2019
DF	(Singapore) Prakash Raj	(Singapore) Young Lions FC	Loan Return
DF	(Singapore) Amer Hakeem	(Singapore) Young Lions FC	Loan Return
MF	(England) Charlie Machell	(Cambodia) Svay Rieng FC	1 year contract signed in 2019
FW	(Singapore) Syukri Bashir	(Singapore) Young Lions FC	Loan Return
FW	(Singapore) Daniel Martens	(Singapore) Albirex Niigata (S)	Loan return
FW	(Singapore) Sahil Suhaimi	(Singapore) Warriors FC	1 year contract signed in 2019
FW	(Singapore) Shawal Anuar	(Singapore) Geylang International	2 years contract signed in 2019

Note 1: Syukri Bashir returned to the team after the loan and move to Tanjong Pagar United.

Note 2: Amer Hakeem was released after returning from loan.

==== Out ====
Position	Player	Transferred To	Ref
DF	(Singapore) Azhar Manap	(Singapore) Balestier Khalsa	
DF	(South Korea) Kong Ho-won	(Singapore)	
DF	(Singapore) (Wales) Harhys Stewart	(Singapore) Young Lions FC	
DF	(Singapore) Sahffee Jubpre	(Singapore) Young Lions FC	
DF	(Singapore) Afiq Yunos	(Thailand) Trat F.C.	Season loan
DF	(Singapore) Amer Hakeem	(Singapore) Geylang International	
MF	(Singapore) Amir Zalani	(Singapore)	
MF	(Singapore) Timothy David Yeo	(Singapore)	
MF	(Singapore) Karthik Raj	(Singapore) Balestier Khalsa	
MF	(Singapore) Zulfahmi Arifin	(Thailand) Suphanburi F.C.	Season loan
FW	(Singapore) Faris Ramli	(Malaysia) Terengganu F.C. I	
FW	(Singapore) Iqbal Hussain	(Singapore) Geylang International	
FW	(Singapore) Fazrul Nawaz	(Singapore) Warriors FC	
FW	(France) Paulin Mbaye	(Singapore)	
FW	(Singapore) Syukri Bashir	(Singapore) Tanjong Pagar United	Free

Note 1: Amer Hakeem was released after returning from loan. He moved to Geylang International in the mid-season transfer window.

==== Retained / Extension ====
Position	Player	Ref
Coach	(Singapore) Clement Teo	
GK	(Singapore) Khairulhin Khalid	1 Year contract signed in 2019
GK	(Singapore) Ridhuan Barudin	1 Year contract signed in 2019
GK	(Singapore) Heng How Meng	
DF	(Singapore) Nazrul Nazari	2 years contract signed in 2019
DF	(Singapore) Muhaimin Suhaimi	2 years contract signed in 2019
DF	(Singapore) Hafiz Sujad	1 Year contract signed in 2019
DF	(Singapore) Afiq Yunos	1 Year contract signed in 2019
DF	(Singapore) Jordan Nicolas Vestering	1 Year contract signed in 2019
DF	(Singapore) Alif Iskandar	
DF	(Singapore) Faiz Salleh	1 Year contract signed in 2019
MF	(Singapore) Afiq Noor	1 Year contract signed in 2019
MF	(Singapore) Nikesh Singh Sidhu	1 Year contract signed in 2019
MF	(Singapore) Anumanthan Kumar	1 Year contract signed in 2019
MF	(Singapore) Fabian Kwok	1 Year contract signed in 2019
MF	(Singapore) Justin Hui	1 Year contract signed in 2019
MF	(Singapore) Mahathir Azeman	1 Year contract signed in 2019
FW	(Singapore) Shahfiq Ghani	2 years contract signed in 2019
FW	(Croatia) Stipe Plazibat	1 Year contract signed in 2019

==== Promoted ====
Position	Player	Ref
MF	(Singapore) Farhan Zulkifli	1 Year contract signed in 2019

==== Trial ====
Position	Player	Trial From	Ref

=== Mid-season transfer ===
==== In ====
Position	Player	Transferred From	Ref
GK	(Singapore) Daniel Ong	(Singapore) Tiong Bahru FC	
DF	(Singapore) Afiq Yunos	(Thailand) Trat F.C.	Loan Return
DF	(Singapore) Lionel Tan	(Singapore) SAFSA	NS Completed
DF	(Singapore) Emmeric Ong	(Singapore) Warriors FC	
FW	(Singapore) Naufal Azman	(Singapore) Young Lions FC	

Note 1: Afiq Yunos returned to the team after the loan and move from Trat FC was cancelled due to Covid 19.

==== Out ====
Position	Player	Transferred To	Ref
DF	(Singapore) Jordan Vestering	(Singapore) SAFSA	NS till 2022
GK	(Singapore) Heng How Meng	(Singapore) SAFSA	NS till 2022
FW	(Croatia) Stipe Plazibat	(Singapore) Lion City Sailors F.C.	Undisclosed
DF	(Australia) Zachary Anderson		Free
MF	(England) Charlie Machell		Free

== Friendlies ==
=== Pre-Season Friendly ===
Win Draw Loss

29 January 2020 Friendly	Hougang United (Singapore)	6–3	Singapore Football Club	Hougang Stadium
	Sahil Suhaimi; Farhan Zulkifli; Hafiz Sujad; Shahfiq Ghani		Ross Plain

1 February 2020 Friendly	Hougang United (Singapore)	7–0	(Singapore) Admiralty CSC	Hougang Stadium
	Sahil Suhaimi; Farhan Zulkifli; Shahfiq Ghani; Hafiz Sujad; Justin Hui; Stipe Plazibat

=== Tour of Malaysia ===
16 January 2020 Friendly	Terengganu F.C. I (Malaysia)	4–0	(Singapore) Hougang United	Kuala Lumpur
	Sanjar Shaakhmedov 10', 57'; Dominique Da Sylva 34', 75'			Stadium: UM Arena Stadium

18 January 2020 Friendly	UiTM F.C. (Malaysia)	cancelled	(Singapore) Hougang United	Kuala Lumpur
				Stadium: PKNS Sports Complex

20 January 2020 Friendly	Kuala Lumpur FA (Malaysia)	2–2	(Singapore) Hougang United	Kuala Lumpur
	Francis Koné 47'; Paulo Josué 90+5'		Hafiz Sujad 37'; Stipe Plazibat 65'	Stadium: Kuala Lumpur Stadium

== Team statistics ==
=== Appearances and goals ===
As of 25 Feb 2020

No.	Pos.	Player	Sleague		Singapore Cup		AFC Cup		Charity Shield		Total	
No.	Pos.	Player	Apps.	Goals	Apps.	Goals	Apps.	Goals	Apps.	Goals	Apps.	Goals
2	DF	(Singapore) Anders Aplin	14	2	0	0	3	0	1	0	18	2
3	DF	(Kyrgyzstan) Maksat Dzhakybaliev	1(6)	0	0	0	0	0	0	0	7	0
4	MF	(Singapore) Afiq Noor	9(4)	0	0	0	3	0	0(1)	0	17	0
5	DF	(Singapore) Lionel Tan	11	0	0	0	0	0	0	0	11	0
6	MF	(Singapore) Anumanthan Kumar	5(2)	0	0	0	1(1)	0	0	0	9	0
7	FW	(Singapore) Shahfiq Ghani	4(7)	1	0	0	1(2)	0	1	0	15	1
8	DF	(Singapore) Hafiz Sujad	9(2)	0	0	0	3	0	0	0	14	0
10	FW	(Singapore) Shawal Anuar	9(4)	4	0	0	1(2)	0	1	0	17	4
11	DF	(Singapore) Nazrul Nazari	13(1)	0	0	0	3	0	0	0	17	0
12	MF	(Singapore) Fabian Kwok	9(4)	0	0	0	2	0	0(1)	0	16	0
13	GK	(Singapore) Ridhuan Barudin	10	0	0	0	0	0	0	0	10	0
14	DF	(Singapore) Alif Iskandar	0	0	0	0	0	0	0	0	0	0
16	MF	(Singapore) Justin Hui	3(6)	1	0	0	0	0	0	0	9	1
17	DF	(Singapore) Faiz Salleh	1(6)	0	0	0	1	0	0	0	8	0
18	GK	(Singapore) Khairulhin Khalid	3	0	0	0	3	0	1	0	7	0
20	DF	(Singapore) Muhaimin Suhaimi	3(2)	0	0	0	0	0	1	0	6	0
21	MF	(Singapore) Nikesh Singh Sidhu	8(1)	0	0	0	0	0	1	0	10	0
22	MF	(Singapore) Mahathir Azeman	0	0	0	0	0	0	0	0	0	0
23	FW	(Singapore) Sahil Suhaimi	1(3)	1	0	0	3	0	0(1)	0	8	1
24	MF	(Singapore) Farhan Zulkifli	12(1)	1	0	0	0	0	1	0	14	1
26	FW	(Singapore) Daniel Martens	2	0	0	0	0	0	0	0	2	0
31	GK	(Singapore) Daniel Ong	1	0	0	0	0	0	0	0	1	0
32	FW	(Singapore) Naufal Azman	2(2)	0	0	0	0	0	0	0	4	0
35	DF	(Singapore) Emmeric Ong	0(1)	0	0	0	0	0	0	0	1	0
Players who have played this season but had left the club or on loan to other club
1	GK	(Singapore) Heng How Meng	0	0	0	0	0	0	0	0	0	0
9	FW	(Croatia) Stipe Plazibat	3	5	0	0	3	4	0	0	6	9
15	DF	(Singapore) (Netherlands) Jordan Vestering	3	1	0	0	1	0	1	0	5	1
19	DF	(Australia) Zac Anderson	10	1	0	0	3	0	1	0	14	1
25	MF	(England) Charlie Machell	7(1)	2	0	0	2	1	1	0	11	3

== Competitions ==
=== Overview ===
Competition	Record							
Competition	P	W	D	L	GF	GA	GD	Win %

=== Charity Shield ===
Win Draw Loss

22 February 2020 Charity Shield (Note: Hougang United was a last minute replacement for DPMM FC after DPMM pulled out from the Charity Shield due to Covid 19.)	Tampines Rovers (Singapore)	3–0	(Singapore) Hougang United	Jalan Besar Stadium
18:00	Irwan Shah 57'; Boris Kopitović 63'; Jordan Webb 69' (yellow card) 81' (yellow-red card) 82'; Kyoga Nakamura (yellow card) 34'; Syazwan Buhari (yellow card) 90'		Shawal Anuar (yellow card) 41'; Jordan Nicolas Vestering (yellow card) 48'; Anders Aplin (yellow card) 81'; Afiq Noor (yellow card) 85'	Referee: Ahmad A'Qashah

=== Singapore Premier League ===
Win Draw Loss

1 March 2020 1	Young Lions FC (Singapore)	1–4	(Singapore) Hougang United	Jurong West Stadium
	Ilhan Fandi 57'; Nur Adam Abdullah (yellow card) 72'	Report	Stipe Plazibat 7' 43' 90+1'; Jordan Nicolas Vestering 35' (yellow card) 71'; Farhan Zulkifli (yellow card) 38'; Afiq Noor (yellow card) 90'	Referee: G. Letchman; Man of the Match: (Croatia) Stipe Plazibat

15 March 2020 2	Hougang United (Singapore)	1–2	(Singapore) Geylang International	Hougang Stadium
	Shawal Anuar 81'; Anders Aplin (yellow card) 44'	Report	Christopher van Huizen 15' 49'; Firdaus Kasman (yellow card) 65'; Joshua Pereira (yellow card) 90+4'	Attendance: 0 (Note: Due to Covid 19, this match is played behind closed door.); Referee: Farhan Mohd; Man of the Match: (Singapore) Christopher van Huizen

18 March 2020 3	Balestier Khalsa (Singapore)	2–2	(Singapore) Hougang United	Bishan Stadium
	Šime Žužul 38'; Shuhei Hoshino 64'; Hazzuwan Halim (yellow card) 43'; Zaiful Nizam (yellow card) 57'	Report	Stipe Plazibat 48' 57'; Fabian Kwok (yellow card) 42'; Sahil Suhaimi (yellow card) 90'	Attendance: 0 Referee: Lim Liang Yi; Man of the Match: (Croatia) Stipe Plazibat

17 October 2020 4 (Rescheduled) (Note: The match is postponed following the coronavirus pandemic.)	Tampines Rovers (Singapore)	1–2	(Singapore) Hougang United	Our Tampines Hub
	Irwan Shah 60'; Taufik Suparno (yellow card) 75'; Syahrul Sazali (yellow card) 19'; Amirul Adli (yellow card) 49'	Report	Sahil Suhaimi 15' (yellow card) 33'; Farhan Zulkifli 18'; Maksat Dzhakybaliev (yellow card) 90+5'	Attendance: 0 Referee: Jansen Foo; Man of the Match: (Singapore) Sahil Suhaimi

1 November 2020 5 (Rescheduled)	Tanjong Pagar United (Singapore)	0–0	(Singapore) Hougang United	Bishan Stadium
	Syabil Hisham (yellow card) 16'; Raihan Rahman (yellow card) 30'; Suhairi Sabri (yellow card) 30'; Nashrul Amin (yellow card) 45+3'; Kenji Syed Rusydi (yellow card) 77'	Report	Muhaimin Suhaimi (yellow card) 44'; Charlie Machell (yellow card) 45+2'; Lionel Tan (yellow card) 62'; Afiq Noor (yellow card) 72'	Attendance: 0 Referee: Y. Sathyakumar; Man of the Match: (Singapore) Delwinder Singh

4 November 2020 6 (Rescheduled)	Lion City Sailors (Singapore)	1–1	(Singapore) Hougang United	Bishan Stadium
	Shahdan Sulaiman 60' (yellow card) 30'; Saifullah Akbar (yellow card) 67'; Tajeli Salamat (yellow card) 82'	Report	Shawal Anuar 33'; Farhan Zulkifli (yellow card) 72'; Justin Hui (yellow card) 83'; Lionel Tan (yellow card) 90+2'	Attendance: 0 Referee: Ahmad A'Qashah; Man of the Match: (Singapore) Shawal Anuar

8 November 2020 7 (Rescheduled)	Albirex Niigata (S) (Singapore)	4–0	(Singapore) Hougang United	Jurong East Stadium
	Hiroyoshi Kamata 55'; Kenta Kurishima 68'; Tomoyuki Doi 77'; Rio Sakuma 90+1'; Ryosuke Nagasawa (yellow card) 53'	Report	Hafiz Sujad (yellow card) 35'; Fabian Kwok (yellow card) 50'	Attendance: 0 Referee: Jansen Foo; Man of the Match: (Japan) Hiroyoshi Kamata

12 November 2020 8 (Rescheduled)	Hougang United (Singapore)	4–1	(Singapore) Young Lions FC	Hougang Stadium
	Zac Anderson 17'; Charlie Machell 46'; Shawal Anuar 80'; Anders Aplin 84'; Shahfiq Ghani (yellow card) 11' (yellow-red card) 45'; Daniel Ong (yellow card) 28'; Nikesh Singh (yellow card) 40'	Report	Jacob Mahler 28' (pen.); Syed Akmal (yellow card) 16'; Nur Adam Abdullah (yellow card) 26'; Ryhan Stewart (yellow card) 36'; Hami Syahin (yellow card) 51' (yellow-red card) 70'	Attendance: 0 Referee: Muhammad Zulfiqar; Man of the Match: (Japan) Anders Aplin

17 November 2020 9 (Rescheduled)	Hougang United (Singapore)	1–3	(Singapore) Lion City Sailors	Hougang Stadium
	Charlie Machell 90+2' (pen.); Daniel Martens (yellow card) 45'; Maksat Dzhakybaliev (yellow card) 77'; Farhan Zulkifli (yellow card) 80'	Report	Gabriel Quak 12'; Hafiz Nor 57'; Shahdan Sulaiman 87'	Attendance: 0 Referee: Lim Liang Yi; Man of the Match: (Singapore) Gabriel Quak

21 November 2020 10 (Rescheduled)	Geylang International (Singapore)	2–0	(Singapore) Hougang United	Our Tampines Hub
	Barry Maguire 42'; Amy Recha 59'; Yuki Ichikawa (yellow card) 30'; Firdaus Kasman (yellow card) 83'	Report	Nazrul Nazari (yellow card) 90+1'	Attendance: 0 Referee: Jansen Foo; Man of the Match: (Netherlands) Barry Maguire

25 November 2020 11 (Rescheduled)	Hougang United (Singapore)	0–2	(Singapore) Tampines Rovers	Hougang Stadium
	Anders Aplin (yellow card) 17'; Farhan Zulkifli (yellow card) 32'; Nazrul Nazari (yellow card) 56'; Hafiz Sujad (yellow card) 73'	Report	Boris Kopitović 22' (yellow card) 76'; Taufik Suparno 46'; Fazrul Nawaz (yellow card) 90+2'	Attendance: 0 Referee: Nathan Chan; Man of the Match: (Singapore) Yasir Hanapi

28 November 2020 12 (Rescheduled)	Hougang United (Singapore)	3–2	(Singapore) Tanjong Pagar United	Hougang Stadium
	Anders Aplin 52'; Shawal Anuar 24' (pen.); Shahfiq Ghani 87'; Nikesh Singh (yellow card) 18'; Hafiz Sujad (yellow card) 42'; Fabian Kwok (yellow card) 54'	Report	Farihin Farkhan 22'; Suria Prakash 65'; Yann Motta (yellow card) 20'; Shodai Nishikawa (yellow card) 37'	Attendance: 0 Referee: Farhan Mohd; Man of the Match: (Singapore) Shawal Anuar

2 December 2020 13 (Rescheduled)	Hougang United (Singapore)	1–2	(Singapore) Balestier Khalsa	Hougang Stadium
	Justin Hui 10'; Maksat Dzhakybaliev (yellow card) 30'; Shawal Anuar (yellow card) 90+4'	Report	Shuhei Hoshino 5' (yellow card) 50'; Šime Žužul 76'; Hazzuwan Halim (yellow card) 14'	Attendance: 0 Referee: Syarqawi Buhari; Man of the Match: (Croatia) Šime Žužul

5 December 2020 14 (Rescheduled)	Hougang United (Singapore)	0–1	(Singapore) Albirex Niigata (S)	Hougang Stadium
	Nikesh Singh (yellow card) 32'	Report	Ryoya Tanigushi 53'	Attendance: 0 Referee: Juherman Zaiton; Man of the Match: (Japan) Ryoya Tanigushi

Pos	Team	Pld	W	D	L	GF	GA	GD	Pts	Qualification or relegation
4	Geylang International	14	6	2	6	18	22	−4	20	Qualification for AFC Cup group stage
5	Balestier Khalsa	14	5	4	5	22	28	−6	19	
6	Hougang United	14	4	3	7	19	24	−5	15	
7	Young Lions (Note: The foreign club – Albirex Niigata (S) – as well as the Football Association of Singapore (FAS) under-21 team, Young Lions, are ineligible for any AFC competition spots.)	14	3	0	11	12	38	−26	9	
8	Tanjong Pagar United	14	0	5	9	14	33	−19	5	

Source: Singapore Premier League
Rules for classification: 1) points; 2) goal difference; 3) number of goals scored; 4) number of wins

=== Singapore Cup ===
Win Draw Loss

=== AFC Cup ===
Pos	Team	Pld	W	D	L	GF	GA	GD	Pts	HCM	YAN	HOU	LTO
1	(Vietnam) Hồ Chí Minh City	3	2	1	0	7	4	+3	7 (Note: Head-to-head away goals: Hồ Chí Minh City 2, Yangon United 0.)	—	~~26 Sep~~	~~29 Sep~~	~~23 Sep~~
2	(Myanmar) Yangon United	3	2	1	0	6	4	+2	7	2–2	—	1–0	3–2
3	(Singapore) Hougang United	3	1	0	2	5	5	0	3	2–3	~~23 Sep~~	—	~~26 Sep~~
4	(Laos) Lao Toyota	3	0	0	3	3	8	−5	0	0–2	~~29 Sep~~	1–3	—

Source: AFC
Rules for classification: Tiebreakers
Notes:

Win Draw Loss

==== Group stage ====
11 February 2020 Matchday 1	Lao Toyota F.C. (Laos)	1–3	(Singapore) Hougang United	Vientiane, Laos
	Goran Jerković 15'; Somsavath Sorphabmixay (yellow card) 10'; Piyaphong Pathammavong (yellow card) 81'	Report	Charlie Machell 38'; Stipe Plazibat 53' 82' (pen.) (yellow card) 90+3'; Afiq Noor (yellow card) 13'; Fabian Kwok (yellow card) 26'	Stadium: New Laos National Stadium; Attendance: 1,215; Referee: Ali Abdulnabi (Bahrain)

25 February 2020 Matchday 2	Hougang United (Singapore)	2–3	(Vietnam) Ho Chi Minh City FC	Kallang, Singapore
	Stipe Plazibat 77' (pen.) 80'; Hafiz Sujad (yellow card) 46'; Fabian Kwok (yellow card) 50'	Report	Nguyễn Công Phượng 14'; Amido Baldé 45+1' 60'; Le Van Son (yellow card) 70'; Bùi Tien Dung (yellow card) 75'; Nguyen Cong Thanh (yellow card) 90'	Stadium: Jalan Besar Stadium; Attendance: 873; Referee: Kim Dae-yong (South Korea)

10 March 2020 Matchday 3	Yangon United F.C. (Myanmar)	1–0	(Singapore) Hougang United	Yangon, Myanmar
	Than Paing 81'	Report	Anumanthan Kumar (yellow card) 27'	Stadium: Thuwunna Stadium; Referee: Jonathon Barreiro (Australia)

23 September 2020 Matchday 4 (Rescheduled)	Hougang United (Singapore)	cancelled	(Myanmar) Yangon United F.C.	Ho Chi Minh City, Vietnam
		Report		Stadium: Thống Nhất Stadium

26 September 2020 Matchday 5 (Rescheduled)	Hougang United (Singapore)	cancelled	(Laos) Lao Toyota F.C.	Ho Chi Minh City, Vietnam
		Report		Stadium: Thống Nhất Stadium

29 September 2020 Matchday 6 (Rescheduled)	Ho Chi Minh City FC (Vietnam)	cancelled	(Singapore) Hougang United	Ho Chi Minh City, Vietnam
		Report		Stadium: Thống Nhất Stadium
