= 2019 Warriors FC season =

Warriors
2019 season
- Chairman: Philip Lam Tin Sing
- Head coach: Mirko Grabovac
- Stadium: Jurong West Stadium
- S.League: 7th
- Singapore Cup: Runner-up

The 2019 season was Warriors' 24th consecutive season in the top flight of Singapore football and in the S.League. Along with the S.League, the club also competed in the Prime League, the Singapore Cup and the Singapore League Cup.

== Squad ==
=== S.League squad ===
As of 11 February 2019

| Squad No. | Name | Nationality | Date of birth (age) | Previous club | Contract Start | Contract end |
Goalkeepers
| 1 | Kimura Riki ^{U23} | (Singapore) (Japan) | 14 November 2000 (age 25) | (Singapore) FFA Under-17 | 2019 | |
| 13 | Shahul Rayyan | (Singapore) | 12 February 1995 (age 31) | (Singapore) Albirex Niigata (S) | 2019 | |
| 18 | Fashah Iskandar | (Singapore) | 15 February 1995 (age 31) | (Singapore) Young Lions FC | 2018 | |
Defenders
| 2 | Daniel Shafiq ^{U23} | (Singapore) | 22 November 1998 (age 27) | Youth Team | 2018 | |
| 3 | Yeo Hai Ngee | (Singapore) | 12 January 1995 (age 31) | (Singapore) Geylang International | 2019 | 2019 |
| 4 | Delwinder Singh | (Singapore) | 5 August 1992 (age 33) | (Singapore) Hougang United | 2018 | |
| 5 | Kento Fukuda (Captain) | (Japan) | 15 May 1990 (age 35) | (Singapore) Geylang International | 2016 | |
| 8 | Emmeric Ong | (Singapore) | 25 January 1991 (age 35) | (Singapore) LionsXII | 2015 | |
| 16 | Ryhan Stewart ^{U23} | (Singapore) (Wales) | 15 February 2000 (age 26) | (Singapore) Tampines Rovers | 2019 | |
| 21 | R Aaravin ^{U23} | (Singapore) | 24 February 1996 (age 30) | (Singapore) Young Lions FC | 2019 | |
| 25 | Shameer Aziq | (Singapore) | 30 December 1995 (age 30) | (Singapore) Tampines Rovers | 2019 | 2019 |
| 27 | Tajeli Salamat | (Singapore) | 7 February 1994 (age 32) | (Singapore) Tiong Bahru FC (NFL D1) | 2018 | |
Midfielders
| 6 | Ammirul Emmran | (Singapore) | 18 April 1995 (age 30) | (Singapore) Young Lions FC | 2018 | |
| 10 | Poh Yi Feng ^{>30} | (Singapore) | 15 November 1986 (age 39) | (Singapore) Balestier Khalsa | 2016 | |
| 11 | Ignatius Ang | (Singapore) | 12 November 1992 (age 33) | (Singapore) SAFSA (NFL D1) | 2018 | |
| 22 | Gabriel Quak | (Singapore) | 22 December 1990 (age 35) | (Thailand) Royal Thai Navy F.C. | 2019 | 2019 |
| 23 | Suria Prakash | (Singapore) | 23 December 1993 (age 32) | (Singapore) SAFSA (NFL D1) | 2018 | |
| 24 | Afiq Ehwan ^{U23} | (Singapore) | 25 January 2000 (age 26) | (Singapore) FFA Under-17 | 2019 | |
| 26 | Faizal Raffi ^{U23} | (Singapore) | 20 January 1996 (age 30) | (Singapore) Tampines Rovers | 2019 | 2019 |
| 28 | Aarish Kumar ^{U23} | (Singapore) | 19 May 1999 (age 26) | Youth Team | 2019 | 2019 |
Strikers
| 7 | Sahil Suhaimi | (Singapore) | 8 July 1992 (age 33) | (Malaysia) Sarawak FA | 2018 | |
| 9 | Jonathan Béhé | (France) | 13 January 1989 (age 37) | (Malaysia) Negeri Sembilan FA | 2018 | 2019 |
| 12 | Khairul Nizam | (Singapore) | 25 June 1991 (age 34) | (Singapore) Home United | 2018 | |
| 15 | Fadhil Noh | (Singapore) | 4 March 1989 (age 37) | (Singapore) Balestier Khalsa | 2017 | |
| 17 | Zulkiffli Hassim | (Singapore) | 26 March 1986 (age 39) | (Singapore) Yishun Sentek Mariners FC (NFL D1) | 2019 | |
| 19 | Ifat Sha'aban ^{U23} | (Singapore) | | Youth Team | 2019 | |
| 20 | Fairoz Hassan | (Singapore) | 26 November 1988 (age 37) | (Singapore) Geylang International | 2019 | |
| 29 | Ryosuke Nagasawa | (Japan) | 25 September 1998 (age 27) | (Thailand) Phuket City F.C. | 2019 | 2019 |
Players left club during season
| 14 | Ruzree Rohzaini ^{U23} | (Singapore) | 19 October 1997 (age 28) | Youth Team | 2019 | |

== Coaching staff ==
| Position | Name | Ref. |
|---|---|---|
| General Manager | (Singapore) Paul Poh | |
| Head Coach | (Singapore) Azlan Alipah | |
| Assistant Coach | (Singapore) Ismadi Mukhtar | |
| Goalkeeping Coach | (Singapore) Lee Bee Seng | |
| Team Manager | (Singapore) Yeo Jun Xian | |
| Fitness Trainer | (Singapore) Syaqir Sulaiman | |
| Sports Trainer | (Singapore) Narasiman Sathivelu | |

== Transfers ==
=== Pre-Season transfers ===
==== In ====
| Position | Player | Transferred From | Ref |
|---|---|---|---|
| GK | (Singapore) Shahul Rayyan | (Singapore) Albirex Niigata (S) | |
| GK | (Singapore) Bryan Quek | (Singapore) Admiralty FC (NFL D1) | Loan Return |
| GK | (Singapore) (Japan) Kimura Riki | (Singapore) FFA Under-17 | |
| DF | (Singapore) Fazli Shafie | (Singapore) Admiralty FC (NFL D1) | Loan Return |
| DF | (Singapore) R Aaravin | (Singapore) Young Lions FC | |
| DF | (Singapore) (Wales) Ryhan Stewart | (Singapore) Tampines Rovers | |
| DF | (Singapore) Shameer Aziq | (Singapore) Tampines Rovers | |
| DF | (Singapore) Yeo Hai Ngee | (Singapore) Geylang International | |
| MF | (Singapore) Zuhaili Mazli | (Singapore) Admiralty FC (NFL D1) | Loan Return |
| MF | (Singapore) Aniq Iskandar | (Singapore) Young Lions FC | Loan Return |
| MF | (Singapore) Afiq Ehwan | (Singapore) FFA Under-17 | |
| MF | (Singapore) Gabriel Quak | (Thailand) Royal Thai Navy F.C. | |
| MF | (Singapore) Faizal Raffi | (Singapore) Tampines Rovers | |
| FW | (Singapore) Fairoz Hassan | (Singapore) Geylang International | |
| FW | (Singapore) Zulkiffli Hassim | (Singapore) Yishun Sentek Mariners FC (NFL D1) | |
| FW | (Japan) Ryosuke Nagasawa | (Thailand) Phuket City F.C. | |

Note 1: Bryan Quek returned to the team after the loan and subsequently released.

Note 2: Fazli Shafie returned to the team after the loan and move to NFL club, Jungfrau Punggol FC.

Note 3: Zuhaili Mazli returned to the team after the loan and subsequently released.

Note 4: Aniq Iskandar returned to the team after the loan and subsequently released.

==== Out ====
| Position | Player | Transferred To | Ref |
|---|---|---|---|
| Coach | (Croatia) Mirko Grabovac | End of Contract | |
| GK | (Singapore) Hyrulnizam Juma'at | (Singapore) Albirex Niigata (S) | |
| GK | (Singapore) Bryan Quek | | |
| GK | (Singapore) Mukundan Maran | | |
| DF | (Singapore) Ho Wai Loon | (Singapore) Home United | |
| DF | (Singapore) Ismadi Mukhtar | Retired | |
| DF | (Singapore) Fazli Shafie | (Singapore) Jungfrau Punggol FC (NFL D1) | Free |
| DF | (Singapore) Wong Wen Jie | (Singapore) Jungfrau Punggol FC (NFL D1) | Free |
| MF | (Singapore) Firdaus Kasman | (Singapore) Geylang International | |
| MF | (Singapore) Hafiz Sulaiman | | |
| MF | (Singapore) Nur Luqman | (Singapore) Garena Young Lions | |
| MF | (Singapore) Zuhaili Mazli | (Singapore) Jungfrau Punggol FC (NFL D1) | Free |
| MF | (Singapore) Aniq Iskandar | (Singapore) SAFSA (NFL D1) | NS |
| MF | (Singapore) Shamil Sharif | Retired | |

==== Extension ====
| Position | Player | Ref |
|---|---|---|
| DF | (Japan) Kento Fukuda | |
| DF | (Singapore) Daniel Shafiq | |
| DF | (Singapore) Emmeric Ong | |
| MF | (Singapore) Ammirul Emmran | |
| MF | (Singapore) Poh Yi Feng | |
| MF | (Singapore) Suria Prakash | |
| MF | (Singapore) Shamil Sharif | |
| FW | (Singapore) Sahil Suhaimi | |
| FW | (Singapore) Ignatius Ang | |
| FW | (Singapore) Fadhil Noh | |
| FW | (Singapore) Tajeli Salamat | |
| FW | (Singapore) Khairul Nizam | |
| FW | (Singapore) Sahil Suhaimi | |

==== Promoted ====
| Position | Player | Ref |
|---|---|---|
| DF | (Singapore) Ruzree Rohzaini | |
| MF | (Singapore) Aarish Kumar | |
| FW | (Singapore) Ifat Sha'aban | |

==== Trial ====
| Position | Player | Trial @ | Ref |

=== Mid-Season Transfer ===
==== Out ====
| Position | Player | Transferred To | Ref |
|---|---|---|---|
| DF | (Singapore) Ruzree Rohzaini | (Singapore) Garena Young Lions | Season loan |

== Friendly ==
=== Pre-Season Friendly ===
Win Draw Loss

| 8 February 2019 1 | Projects Vault Oxley FC (Singapore) (NFL) | 0–4 | (Singapore) Warriors FC | Jalan Besar Stadium |
| 7pm |

Tour of Malaysia (9 to 18 January)

| 9 January 2019 1 | Melaka United (Malaysia) | 5–1 | (Singapore) Warriors FC | Hang Jebat Stadium |
| 2045 hours | Anselmo Casagrande 15,34'; Devan Raj 27'; Luka Milunovic 39'; Nurshamil Abd Ghani 53' | Report | Sahil Suhaimi 83' |

| 12 January 2019 2 | Negeri Sembilan FA (Malaysia) | 2–1 | (Singapore) Warriors FC | Paroi, Negeri Sembilan |
| 2045 hours | Goal | Report | Goal | Stadium: Tuanku Abdul Rahman Stadium |

| 14 January 2019 3 | UiTM F.C. (Malaysia) | 2–1 | (Singapore) Warriors FC | Bukit Jelutong, Selangor |
| 1645 hours | Goal | | Goal | Stadium: Sime Darby Field |

| 17 January 2019 4 | PKNP F.C. (Malaysia) | 2–0 | (Singapore) Warriors FC | Manjung District, Perak |
| 2045 hours | Hafiz Ramdan 23'; Hafiz Kamal 72' | | | Stadium: Manjung Municipal Council Stadium |

== Team statistics ==
=== Appearances and goals ===
As of 29 September 2018

| No. | Pos. | Player | Sleague | | Singapore Cup | | Total | |
| No. | Pos. | Player | Apps. | Goals | Apps. | Goals | Apps. | Goals |
|---|---|---|---|---|---|---|---|---|
| 1 | GK | (Singapore) (Japan) Kimura Riki | 2 | 0 | 0 | 0 | 2 | 0 |
| 2 | DF | (Singapore) Daniel Shafiq | 11 | 0 | 0 | 0 | 11 | 0 |
| 3 | DF | (Singapore) Yeo Hai Ngee | 4(2) | 1 | 1(1) | 0 | 8 | 1 |
| 4 | DF | (Singapore) Delwinder Singh | 13(3) | 0 | 2 | 0 | 18 | 0 |
| 5 | DF | (Japan) Kento Fukuda | 21 | 1 | 6 | 0 | 27 | 1 |
| 6 | MF | (Singapore) Ammirul Emmran | 2(12) | 0 | 0(2) | 0 | 16 | 0 |
| 7 | FW | (Singapore) Sahil Suhaimi | 17(4) | 5 | 2(3) | 4 | 26 | 9 |
| 8 | DF | (Singapore) Emmeric Ong | 11(4) | 0 | 0 | 0 | 15 | 0 |
| 9 | FW | (France) Jonathan Béhé | 21(2) | 12 | 5(1) | 1 | 29 | 13 |
| 10 | MF | (Singapore) Poh Yi Feng | 12(3) | 0 | 6 | 0 | 21 | 0 |
| 11 | MF | (Singapore) Ignatius Ang | 3(16) | 1 | 1(1) | 0 | 21 | 1 |
| 12 | FW | (Singapore) Khairul Nizam | 7(3) | 0 | 4(1) | 4 | 15 | 4 |
| 13 | GK | (Singapore) Shahul Rayyan | 6 | 0 | 2 | 0 | 8 | 0 |
| 15 | FW | (Singapore) Fadhil Noh | 4(1) | 0 | 0 | 0 | 5 | 0 |
| 16 | DF | (Singapore) Ryhan Stewart | 22 | 0 | 6 | 0 | 28 | 0 |
| 17 | FW | (Singapore) Zulkiffli Hassim | 4(5) | 2 | 0(2) | 0 | 11 | 2 |
| 18 | GK | (Singapore) Fashah Iskandar | 16 | 0 | 2(1) | 0 | 19 | 0 |
| 19 | FW | (Singapore) Ifat Sha'aban | 3 | 0 | 0 | 0 | 3 | 0 |
| 20 | FW | (Singapore) Fairoz Hasan | 5(3) | 3 | 0(3) | 1 | 11 | 4 |
| 21 | DF | (Singapore) R Aaravin | 10(3) | 0 | 1 | 0 | 14 | 0 |
| 22 | MF | (Singapore) Gabriel Quak | 22(1) | 9 | 6 | 2 | 29 | 11 |
| 23 | MF | (Singapore) Suria Prakash | 0(5) | 1 | 0(1) | 0 | 6 | 1 |
| 24 | MF | (Singapore) Afiq Ehwan | 1 | 0 | 0 | 0 | 1 | 0 |
| 25 | DF | (Singapore) Shameer Aziq | 4(2) | 0 | 3 | 0 | 9 | 0 |
| 26 | MF | (Singapore) Faizal Raffi | 21 | 3 | 6 | 0 | 27 | 3 |
| 27 | DF | (Singapore) Tajeli Salamat | 20(1) | 0 | 6 | 1 | 27 | 1 |
| 28 | MF | (Singapore) Aarish Kumar | 2 | 0 | 5 | 0 | 7 | 0 |

Note 1: Jonathan Behe scored an own goal in SPL match against Home United.

== Competitions ==
=== Overview ===
| Competition | Record | | | | | | | |
| Competition | P | W | D | L | GF | GA | GD | Win % |
|---|---|---|---|---|---|---|---|---|
| Singapore Premier League | 24 | 6 | 5 | 13 | 40 | 56 | −16 | 25.00 |
| Singapore Cup | 6 | 2 | 2 | 2 | 12 | 13 | −1 | 33.33 |
| Total | 30 | 8 | 7 | 15 | 52 | 69 | −17 | 26.67 |

=== Singapore Premier League ===
Win Draw Loss

| 16 March 2019 1 | Hougang United (Singapore) | 5–1 | (Singapore) Warriors FC | Jalan Besar Stadium |
| | Stipe Plazibat 12' (pen.) 14'; Faris Ramli 37'; Amir Zalani 42' (yellow card) 55'; Fazrul Nawaz 78'; Zulfahmi Arifin (yellow card) 71' | | Fairoz Hassan 94'; Poh Yi Feng (yellow card) 15'; Sahil Suhaimi (yellow card) 64' | Referee: Lim Liang Yi |

| 30 March 2019 2 | Warriors FC (Singapore) | 0–3 | (Singapore) Home United | Jurong East Stadium |
| | Poh Yi Feng (yellow card) 7'; Fadhil Noh (yellow card) 32'; Gabriel Quak (yellow card) 42'; Sahil Suhaimi (yellow card) 71'; Ryhan Stewart (yellow card) 90' | | Hami Syahin 51'; Song Ui-young 71'; Oliver Puflett 83' (yellow card) 72'; Izzdin Shafiq (yellow card) 34' | Referee: Muhammad Zulfiqar |

| 5 April 2019 3 | Geylang International (Singapore) | 5–2 | (Singapore) Warriors FC | Our Tampines Hub |
| | Amy Recha 58' (pen.) 72'; Yuki Ichikawa 66'; Firdaus Kasman 83'; Fareez Farhan 88'; Shahrin Saberin (yellow card) 44'; Syahiran Miswan (yellow card) 62' | | Ignatius Ang 21'; Fairoz Hassan 27'; Poh Yi Feng (red card) 62'; Suria Prakash (yellow card) 79' | Referee: G. Letchman |

| 17 May 2019 4 (Rescheduled) | Warriors FC (Singapore) | 2–0 | (Singapore) Young Lions FC | Jurong East Stadium |
| | Gabriel Quak 55'; Jonathan Béhé 64'; Fairoz Hasan (yellow card) 48' | | | Referee: Abirami Naidu |

| 13 April 2019 5 | Warriors FC (Singapore) | 1–2 | (Singapore) Albirex Niigata (S) | Jurong East Stadium |
| | Jonathan Béhé 37'; Kento Fukuda (yellow card) 53'; Faizal Raffi (yellow card) 64' | | Daizo Horikoshi 25'; Kyoga Nakamura (penalty missed); Hiroyoshi Kamata 49' | Referee: Nathan Chan |

| 20 April 2019 6 | Brunei DPMM | 4–2 | (Singapore) Warriors FC | Hassanal Bolkiah National Stadium |
| | Azwan Ali Rahman 1'; Andrey Varankow 43' (pen.) 90'; Blake Ricciuto 82'; Charlie Clough (yellow card) 63' | | Gabriel Quak 52'; Sahil Suhaimi 68' | Referee: Lim Liang Yi |

| 24 April 2019 7 | Warriors FC (Singapore) | 1–1 | (Singapore) Tampines Rovers | Jurong East Stadium |
| | Sahil Suhaimi 53'; Poh Yi Feng (yellow card) 47'; Jonathan Béhé (yellow card) 91'; Khairul Nizam (yellow card) 90+3' | | Shahdan Sulaiman 26'; Yasir Hanapi (yellow card) 91'; Irwan Shah (yellow card) 90+6' | Referee: Lim Liang Yi |

| 28 April 2019 8 | Balestier Khalsa (Singapore) | 2–1 | (Singapore) Warriors FC | Bishan Stadium |
| | Hazzuwan Halim 46'; Sanjin Vrebac 60'; Nurullah Hussein (yellow card) 56'; Fazli Shafie (yellow card) 88' | | Jonathan Béhé 77' (yellow card) 51'; Gabriel Quak (yellow card) 26' | Referee: Ahmad A'Qashah |

| 11 May 2019 9 | Young Lions FC (Singapore) | 0–2 | (Singapore) Warriors FC | Jalan Besar Stadium |
| | | | Gabriel Quak 45'; Jonathan Béhé 81' | Referee: Jansen Foo |

| 25 May 2019 10 | Warriors FC (Singapore) | 3–2 | (Singapore) Hougang United | Jurong East Stadium |
| | Gabriel Quak 8'; Jonathan Béhé 52' 86'; Delwinder Singh (yellow card) 90' | | Amir Zailani 38'; Hafiz Sujad 76'; Anumanthan Kumar (yellow card) 14,89' (yellow-red card) | Referee: Nathan Chan |

| 15 June 2019 11 | Home United (Singapore) | 4–4 | (Singapore) Warriors FC | Bishan Stadium |
| | Song Ui-young 10' 49'; Shahril Ishak 87' (pen.); Faizal Roslan 90' | | Sahil Suhaimi 19'; Gabriel Quak 45' 52'; Jonathan Béhé 54' | Referee: Ahmad A'Qashah |

| 23 June 2019 12 | Warriors FC (Singapore) | 1–2 | (Singapore) Geylang International | Jurong East Stadium |
| | Jonathan Béhé 37' | | Zikos Vasileios Chua 79' 81' | Referee: Juherman Zaiton |

| 30 June 2019 13 | Albirex Niigata (S) (Singapore) | 1–0 | (Singapore) Warriors FC | Bishan Stadium |
| | Hiroyoshi Kamata 30'; Naruki Takahashi (yellow card) 54'; Kengo Fukudome (yellow card) 83' | | Daniel Shafiq (yellow card) 17' | Referee: Muhammad Taqi |

| 6 July 2019 14 | Warriors FC (Singapore) | 3–3 | Brunei DPMM | Jurong East Stadium |
| | Gabriel Quak 12' 65' (pen.); Jonathan Béhé (penalty missed) 19; Sahil Suhaimi 77'; Ifat Sha'aban (yellow card) 27'; Tajeli Salamat (yellow card) 53'; Poh Yi Feng (yellow card) 69' | | Abdul Azizi Ali Rahman 29'; Azwan Ali Rahman 38'; Blake Ricciuto 55' (yellow card) 25'; Nur Ikhwan Othman (red card) 62' | Referee: Farhan Mohamed |

| 14 July 2019 15 | Tampines Rovers (Singapore) | 1–2 | (Singapore) Warriors FC | Our Tampines Hub |
| | Jordan Webb 90+6' (pen.); Amirul Adli (yellow card) 17' | | Yeo Hai Ngee 22'; Sahil Suhaimi 60' | Referee: Jansen Foo |

| 19 July 2019 16 (Rescheduled) | Warriors FC (Singapore) | 3–3 | (Singapore) Balestier Khalsa | Jurong East Stadium |
| | Jonathan Béhé 3'; Ignatius Ang 68'; Fairoz Hassan 75' | | Sanjin Vrebac 5'; Sime Zuzul 40' 85' (penalty missed) 88 | Referee: Syahir Ahmadi |

| 3 August 2019 17 | Warriors FC (Singapore) | 2–0 | (Singapore) Young Lions FC | Jurong East Stadium |
| | Jonathan Béhé 61' 79' | | | Referee: Nathan Chan |

| 13 August 2019 18 | Hougang United (Singapore) | 3–1 | (Singapore) Warriors FC | Jalan Besar Stadium |
| | Mahathir Azeman 12'; Stipe Plazibat 68'; Faris Ramli 90+2'; Nikesh Singh Sidhu (yellow card) 28'; Afiq Noor (yellow card) 38'; Jordan Nicolas Vestering (yellow card) 45'; Fabian Kwok (yellow card) 82' | | Suria Prakash 85'; R Aaravin (yellow card) 44'; Gabriel Quak (yellow card) 45' | Referee: Lim Liang Yi |

| 17 August 2019 19 | Warriors FC (Singapore) | 1–3 | (Singapore) Home United | Jurong East Stadium |
| | Gabriel Quak 10' | | Shahril Ishak 12,71'; Hafiz Nor 68' | Referee: Jansen Foo |

| 18 September 2019 20 (Rescheduled) | Geylang International (Singapore) | 4–3 | (Singapore) Warriors FC | Our Tampines Hub |
| | Shawal Anuar 4'; Barry Maguire 24'; Fareez Farhan 31' (pen.); Amy Recha 85' (pen.) | | Faizal Raffi 23' 38'; Hairul Syirhan 81' (o.g) | Referee: Farhan Mohamed |

| 31 August 2019 21 | Warriors FC (Singapore) | 2–1 | (Singapore) Albirex Niigata (S) | Jurong East Stadium |
| | Kento Fukuda 40'; Jonathan Béhé 59' | | Daizo Horikoshi 58' | Referee: Muhammad Taqi |

| 14 September 2019 22 | Brunei DPMM | 3–0 | (Singapore) Warriors FC | Hassanal Bolkiah National Stadium |
| | Andrei Varankou 31' 49' 67' | | | Referee: Muhammad Zulfiqar |

| 22 September 2019 23 | Warriors FC (Singapore) | 0–1 | (Singapore) Tampines Rovers | Jurong East Stadium |
| | | | Amirul Adli 84' | Referee: Juherman Zaiton |

| 29 September 2019 24 (Rescheduled) | Balestier Khalsa (Singapore) | 3–3 | (Singapore) Warriors FC | Bishan Stadium |
| | Sanjin Vrebac 67'; Hazzuwan Halim 81' (pen.); Kristijan Krajcek 86' | | Zulkiffli Hassim 41' 45'; Faizal Raffi 73' | Referee: Syahir Ahmadi |

| Pos | Team | Pld | W | D | L | GF | GA | GD | Pts |
|---|---|---|---|---|---|---|---|---|---|
| 5 | Geylang International | 24 | 10 | 3 | 11 | 41 | 48 | −7 | 33 |
| 6 | Home United | 24 | 9 | 3 | 12 | 34 | 46 | −12 | 30 |
| 7 | Warriors | 24 | 6 | 5 | 13 | 40 | 56 | −16 | 23 |
| 8 | Young Lions (Note: The two foreign clubs – Albirex Niigata (S) and DPMM – as well as the Football Association of Singapore (FAS) under-21 team, Young Lions, are ineligible for any AFC competition spots.) | 24 | 6 | 4 | 14 | 21 | 38 | −17 | 22 |
| 9 | Balestier Khalsa | 24 | 4 | 5 | 15 | 37 | 58 | −21 | 17 |

Source: Singapore Premier League
Rules for classification: 1) points; 2) goal difference; 3) number of goals scored; 4) number of wins

=== Singapore Cup ===
Win Draw Loss

| 25 September 2019 Match 1 | Tampines Rovers (Singapore) | 1–3 | (Singapore) Warriors FC | Our Tampines Hub |
| | Jordan Webb 72' (pen.) | | Sahil Suhaimi 7' 73'; Tajeli Salamat 90+2' | Referee: Farhan Mohamad |

| 19 October 2019 Match 2 | Warriors FC (Singapore) | 2–2 | (Singapore) Home United | Jurong East Stadium |
| | Khairul Nizam 46'; Gabriel Quak 62' | | Iqram Rifqi 16'; Song Ui-young 68' | Referee: Syahir Ahmadi |

| 23 October 2019 Match 3 | Balestier Khalsa (Singapore) | 0–0 | (Singapore) Warriors FC | Bishan Stadium |
| | | | | Referee: Farhan Mohamad |

==== Semi-final ====
| 26 October 2019 SF Leg 1 | Warriors FC (Singapore) | 0–1 | Brunei DPMM | Jurong East Stadium |
| | Gabriel Quak (penalty missed) | | Azwan Ali Rahman 41' | Referee: Ahmad A'Qashah |

| 30 October 2019 SF Leg 2 | Brunei DPMM | 4–5 (a.e.t.) (5–5 agg.) (2–4 p) | (Singapore) Warriors FC | Jalan Besar Stadium |
| | Abdul Azizi Ali Rahman 1'; Andrei Varankou 35' 60'; Razimie Ramlli 98' | | Jonathan Behe 12' (pen.) (penalty missed) 66; Khairul Nizam 29'; Sahil Suhaimi 62' 101'; Gabriel Quak 90+1' | Referee: Juherman Zaiton |
| | Penalties |
| | Andrei Varankou (penalty scored); Azwan Ali Rahman (penalty missed); Blake Ricciuto (penalty scored); Charlie Clough (penalty missed) | | Khairul Nizam (penalty scored); Kento Fukuda (penalty scored); Sahil Suhaimi (penalty scored); Tajeli Salamat (penalty scored) |

Warriors FC won 4–2 on penalty after 5–5 aggregate.

==== Final ====
| 3 November 2019 Final | Warriors FC (Singapore) | 3–4 | (Singapore) Tampines Rovers | Jalan Besar Stadium |
| | Khairul Nizam 12' 19'; Sahil Suhaimi (penalty missed) 84; Fairoz Hasan 84'; Shameer Aziq (yellow card) 52'; Yeo Hai Ngee (yellow card) 61' | | Irwan Shah 17'; Joel Chew Joon Herng 31'; Amirul Adli 57'; Zehrudin Mehmedović 65' (yellow card) 90'; Yasir Hanapi (yellow card) 46'; Jordan Webb (yellow card) 74'; Taufik Surpano (yellow card) 78' | Attendance: 2,952; Referee: Muhammad Taqi |
