= 2019 Singapore Cup =

Komoco Motors Singapore Cup

Tournament details
- Country: Singapore
- Dates: 25 September – 2 November 2019
- Teams: 8

Final positions
- Champions: Tampines Rovers FC

Tournament statistics
- Matches played: 18
- Goals scored: 54 (3 per match)
- Top goal scorer(s): (Belarus) Andrey Varankow; Sahil Suhaimi; Khairul Nizam (4 goals)
- All statistics correct as of 2 November 2019.

The 2019 Singapore Cup was the 22nd edition of the Singapore Cup. It was sponsored by Komoco Motors and known as the Komoco Motors Singapore Cup for sponsorship reasons. It was Singapore's annual premier club football knock-out tournament organised by the Football Association of Singapore.

The draw was held on 30 August 2019.

The 2019 Singapore Cup final was played between Tampines Rovers FC and Warriors FC at Jalan Besar Stadium on 2 November 2019. Tampines Rovers won the match 4–3 to secure their fourth Singapore Cup title.

== Format ==
=== Competition ===
The Singapore Cup will commence on 25 September 2019 with a group phase of two groups with four teams each. The teams will compete in the single-round group stage. The top two teams advance to the semifinals with the group winners facing the runner-up team from the other group. The higher seeded teams will host the one-off semifinals. The final will consist of a single match as well.

== Groups ==
=== Group A ===
Pos	Team	Pld	W	D	L	GF	GA	GD	Pts	Qualification
1	Tampines Rovers	3	2	0	1	6	3	+3	6	Semi-finals
2	Warriors	3	1	2	0	5	3	+2	5	Semi-finals
3	Balestier Khalsa	3	1	1	1	3	3	0	4	
4	Home United	3	0	1	2	3	8	−5	1	

Updated to match(es) played on 25 September 2019. Source: FAS
25 September 2019

Home United	1-3	Balestier Khalsa
Song Ui-young 45' (pen.)		Sime Zuzul 36'; Kristijan Krajcek 52', 60'

Bishan Stadium
Referee: Muhammad Zulfiqar
25 September 2019

Tampines Rovers	1-3	Warriors FC
Jordan Webb 72' (pen.)		Sahil Suhaimi 7', 73'; Tajeli Salamat 90'

Our Tampines Hub
Referee: Farhan Mohamad

19 October 2019

Warriors FC	2-2	Home United
Khairul Nizam 47'; Gabriel Quak 63'		Iqram Rifqi 15'; Song Ui-young 69'

Jurong East Stadium
Referee: Syahir Ahmadi
19 October 2019

Balestier Khalsa	0-2	Tampines Rovers
		Jordan Webb 60'; Ryutaro Megumi 79'

Bishan Stadium
Referee: Muhammad Taqi

23 October 2019

Tampines Rovers	3-0	Home United
Zehrudin Mehmedović 66'; Ryutaro Megumi 74'; Taufik Suparno 86'

Our Tampines Hub
Referee: G.Letchman
23 October 2019

Balestier Khalsa	0-0	Warriors FC

Bishan Stadium
Referee: Farhan Mohamad

=== Group B ===
Pos	Team	Pld	W	D	L	GF	GA	GD	Pts	Qualification
1	DPMM FC	3	2	1	0	3	1	+2	7	Semi-finals
2	Geylang International	3	1	1	1	3	3	0	4	Semi-finals
3	Albirex Niigata (S)	3	1	0	2	3	3	0	3	
4	Hougang United	3	1	0	2	2	4	−2	3	

Updated to match(es) played on 25 September 2019. Source: FAS
25 September 2019

Albirex Niigata (S)	1-2	Hougang United
Daizo Horikoshi 30'		Kong Ho-won 29'; Faris Ramli 90' (pen.)

Jurong East Stadium
Referee: G. Letchman
25 September 2019

DPMM FC	1-1	Geylang International
Andrey Varankow 90'		Shawal Anuar 37'

Jalan Besar Stadium
Referee: Syahir Ahmadi

19 October 2019

Hougang United	0-1	DPMM FC
		Andrey Varankow 80'

Jalan Besar Stadium
Referee: Jansen Foo
19 October 2019

Geylang International	0-2	Albirex Niigata (S)
		Daizo Horikoshi 80'; Daichi Tanabe 85'

Our Tampines Hub
Referee: Abirami Naidu

23 October 2019

Hougang United	0-2	Geylang International
		Amy Recha 74'; Fareez Farhan 84' (pen.)

Jalan Besar Stadium
Referee: Juherman Zaiton
23 October 2019

Albirex Niigata (S)	0-1	DPMM FC
		Azwan Ali Rahman 12'

Jurong East Stadium
Referee: Muhammad Zulfiqar

== Semi-finals ==
=== Bracket ===
Semi-finals
Tampines Rovers	2	2	4
Geylang International	0	1	1
DPMM FC	1	4	5 (2)
Warriors FC	0	5	5 (4)

Finals
Tampines Rovers	4
Warriors FC	3

The first legs will be played on 26 October 2019, and the second legs will be played on 30 October 2019.

Team 1	Agg.	Team 2	1st leg	2nd leg
Tampines Rovers	4–1	Geylang International	2–0	2–1
DPMM	5–5	Warriors	1–0	4–5

26 October 2019
17:30 UTC+8

Tampines Rovers	2-0	Geylang International
Shahdan Sulaiman 8' (pen.); Yasir Hanapi 78'

Our Tampines Hub
Referee: Farhan Mohamad
30 October 2019
19:45 UTC+8

Geylang International	1-2	Tampines Rovers
Jufri Taha 74'		Yasir Hanapi 5'; Shahdan Sulaiman 85' (pen.)

Our Tampines Hub
Referee: Nathan Chan

Tampines Rovers won 4-1 on aggregate.

26 October 2019
17:30 UTC+8

DPMM FC	1-0	Warriors
Azwan Ali Rahman 41'

Jalan Besar Stadium
Referee: Ahmad A'Qashah
30 October 2019
19:45 UTC+8

Warriors	5-4 (a.e.t.)	DPMM FC
Jonathan Behe 12' (pen.) (penalty missed) 66; Khairul Nizam 29'; Sahil Suhaimi 62' 101'; Gabriel Quak 90+1'		Abdul Azizi Ali Rahman 1'; Andrei Varankou 35' 60'; Razimie Ramlli 98'
Penalties
Khairul Nizam (penalty scored); Kento Fukuda (penalty scored); Sahil Suhaimi (penalty scored); Tajeli Salamat (penalty scored)	4-2	Andrei Varankou (penalty scored); Azwan Ali Rahman (penalty missed); Blake Ricciuto (penalty scored); Charlie Clough (penalty missed)

Jurong East Stadium
Referee: Juherman Zaiton

Warriors FC won 4-2 on penalty after 5-5 aggregate.

== 3rd / 4th ==
2 November 2019
17:00 UTC+8

Geylang International	2-2	Brunei DPMM
Ifwat Ismail 75'; Fareez Farhan 85' (pen.)		Azwan Saleh 19'; Charlie Clough 90+5'
Penalties
Barry Maguire (penalty scored); Darren Teh (penalty scored); Noor Ariff (penalty scored); Fareez Farhan (penalty scored); Harith Kanadi (penalty scored); Anders Aplin (penalty scored); Umar Akhbar (penalty scored); Yuki Ichikawa (penalty scored); Ifwat Ismail (penalty scored); Shahrin Saberin (penalty scored); Zainol Gulam (penalty scored); Barry Maguire (penalty scored)	12-11	Andrei Varankou (penalty scored); Adi Said (penalty scored); Blake Ricciuto (penalty scored); Najib Tarif (penalty scored); Azwan Ali Rahman (penalty scored); Helmi Zambin (penalty scored); Suhaimi Anak Sulau (penalty scored); Hazwan Hamzah (penalty scored); Yura Indera Putera Yunos (penalty scored); Charlie Clough (penalty scored); Haimie Anak Nyaring (penalty scored); Andrei Varankou (penalty missed)

Jalan Besar Stadium
Referee: G.Letchman

== Final ==
2 November 2019
20:00 UTC+8

Tampines Rovers	4-3	Warriors
Irwan Shah 17'; Joel Chew Joon Herng 31'; Amirul Adli 57'; Zehrudin Mehmedović 65' (yellow card) 90'; Yasir Hanapi (yellow card) 46'; Jordan Webb (yellow card) 74'; Taufik Surpano (yellow card) 78'		Khairul Nizam 12' 19'; Sahil Suhaimi (penalty missed) 84; Fairoz Hasan 84'; Shameer Aziq (yellow card) 52'; Yeo Hai Ngee (yellow card) 61'

Jalan Besar Stadium
Referee: Muhammad Taqi

=== Top scorers ===
As of 2 November 2019

Rank	Player	Team	M1	M2	M3	SF1	SF1	F	Total
1	(Belarus) Andrey Varankow	DPMM FC	1	1	0	0	2	0	4
1	(Singapore) Sahil Suhaimi	Warriors FC	2	0	0	0	2	0	4
1	(Singapore) Khairul Nizam	Warriors FC	0	1	0	0	1	2	4
3	(Brunei) Azwan Ali Rahman	DPMM FC	0	0	1	1	0	0	2
3	(Canada) Jordan Webb	Tampines Rovers	1	1	0	0	0	0	2
3	(Japan) Ryutaro Megumi	Tampines Rovers	0	1	1	0	0	0	2
3	(South Korea) Song Ui-young	Home United	1	1	0	0	0	0	2
3	(Japan) Daizo Horikoshi	Albirex Niigata (S)	1	1	0	0	0	0	2
3	(Croatia) Kristijan Krajcek	Balestier Khalsa	2	0	0	0	0	0	2
3	(Singapore) Gabriel Quak	Warriors FC	0	1	0	0	1	0	2
3	(Singapore) Fareez Farhan	Geylang International	0	0	1	0	0	1	2
3	(Serbia) Zehrudin Mehmedović	Tampines Rovers	0	0	1	0	0	1	2
3	(Singapore) Shahdan Sulaiman	Tampines Rovers	0	0	0	1	1	0	2
3	(Singapore) Yasir Hanapi	Tampines Rovers	0	0	0	1	1	0	2
13	(Croatia) Sime Zuzul	Balestier Khalsa	1	0	0	0	0	0	1
13	(France) Jonathan Behe	Warriors FC	0	0	0	0	1	0	1
13	(Singapore) Tajeli Salamat	Warriors FC	1	0	0	0	0	0	1
13	(Singapore) Fairoz Hasan	Warriors FC	0	0	0	0	0	1	1
13	(Singapore) Iqram Rifqi	Home United	0	1	0	0	0	0	1
13	(Japan) Daichi Tanabe	Albirex Niigata (S)	0	1	0	0	0	0	1
13	(Singapore) Faris Ramli	Hougang United	1	0	0	0	0	0	1
13	(South Korea) Kong Ho-won	Hougang United	1	0	0	0	0	0	1
13	(Singapore) Shawal Anuar	Geylang International	1	0	0	0	0	0	1
13	(Singapore) Ifwat Ismail	Geylang International	0	0	0	0	0	1	1
13	(Singapore) Jufri Taha	Geylang International	0	0	0	0	1	0	1
13	(Singapore) Amy Recha	Geylang International	0	0	1	0	0	0	1
13	(Singapore) Taufik Suparno	Tampines Rovers	0	0	1	0	0	0	1
13	(Singapore) Irwan Shah	Tampines Rovers	0	0	0	0	0	1	1
13	(Singapore) Joel Chew	Tampines Rovers	0	0	0	0	0	1	1
13	(Singapore) Amirul Adli	Tampines Rovers	0	0	0	0	0	1	1
13	(Brunei) Abdul Azizi Ali Rahman	DPMM FC	0	0	0	0	1	0	1
13	(Brunei) Azwan Saleh	DPMM FC	0	0	0	0	0	1	1
13	(England) Charlie Clough	DPMM FC	0	0	0	0	0	1	1
13	(Brunei) Razimie Ramlli	DPMM FC	0	0	0	0	1	0	1
