= Paulin Mbaye =

French footballer

Personal information
- Full name: Paulin Maguette Mbaye
- Date of birth: 16 January 1998 (age 28)
- Position: Forward

Youth career
- Montfaucon
- Racing Besançon
- Fontain
- Clémenceau Besançon
- UE Engordany

Senior career*
| Years | Team | Apps | (Gls) |
| 2018 | SCC Firsts | 1 | (0) |
| 2019 | Hougang United | 1 | (0) |
| 2020–2021 | Besançon Foot | 0 | (0) |
| 2022 | Coffrane II | 2 | (0) |
| 2022–2023 | Saint-Blaise | 7 | (2) |
| 2024–2025 | Bassecourt II | 1 | (1) |
| 2025 | Bassecourt | 4 | (0) |
- * Club domestic league appearances and goals as of 17:14, 8 December 2025 (UTC)

Paulin Mbaye (born 16 January 1996) is a French footballer who last played as a forward for Swiss 1. Liga Classic club Bassecourt.

== Career ==
Mbaye took an interest in football from a young age, joining amateur side Montfaucon at the age of three-and-a-half. Having also played in the academy of Racing Besançon, and at Fontain and Clémenceau Besançon, he left France for Andorra in September 2016, training with UE Engordany. He joined officially in January 2017, but left to move to Singapore, where his father had played, the following year.

In Singapore, Mbaye played once for amateur Cosmoleague club SCC Firsts, before joining professional club Hougang United in 2019. One Singapore Premier League appearance followed, before a return to France with Besançon Foot in 2020. After just one season with Besançon Foot, Mbaye moved to Switzerland, initially joining the reserve team of FC Coffrane, before joining FC Saint-Blaise.

Having left Saint-Blaise in early 2023, Mbaye initially returned to France, before returning to Switzerland to join 1. Liga Classic club FC Bassecourt. He initially began with Bassecourt's reserve team, scoring in his only appearance: the first in an 8–1 win against FC Olympic Fahy. Having started 2025 on the fringes of the Bassecourt first team, Mbaye was pictured in Malaysia later in the year, in the hope of joining an M-League club.

== Personal life ==
As well as football, Mbaye has an interest in journalism, and conducted an interview with Montpellier-based hip-hop group Set & Match for L'Est Républicain in 2015.

== Career statistics ==
=== Club ===
As of 8 December 2025.

Appearances and goals by club, season and competition
| Club | Season | League | | | Cup | | Other | | Total | |
| Club | Season | Division | Apps | Goals | Apps | Goals | Apps | Goals | Apps | Goals |
|---|---|---|---|---|---|---|---|---|---|---|
| SCC Firsts | 2018 | CosmoLeague | 1 | 0 | 0 | 0 | 0 | 0 | 1 | 0 |
| Hougang United | 2019 | Singapore Premier League | 1 | 0 | 0 | 0 | 0 | 0 | 1 | 0 |
| Besançon Foot | 2020–21 | Championnat National 3 | 0 | 0 | 0 | 0 | 0 | 0 | 0 | 0 |
| Coffrane II | 2022–23 | 2. Liga | 2 | 0 | 0 | 0 | 0 | 0 | 2 | 0 |
| Saint-Blaise | 2022–23 | 2. Liga | 7 | 2 | 0 | 0 | 0 | 0 | 7 | 2 |
| Bassecourt II | 2024–25 | 3. Liga | 1 | 1 | 0 | 0 | 0 | 0 | 1 | 1 |
| Bassecourt | 2025–26 | 1. Liga Classic | 4 | 0 | 0 | 0 | 0 | 0 | 4 | 0 |
| Career total | | | 16 | 3 | 0 | 0 | 0 | 0 | 16 | 3 |
