= Amirul Adli =

Singaporean footballer (born 1996)

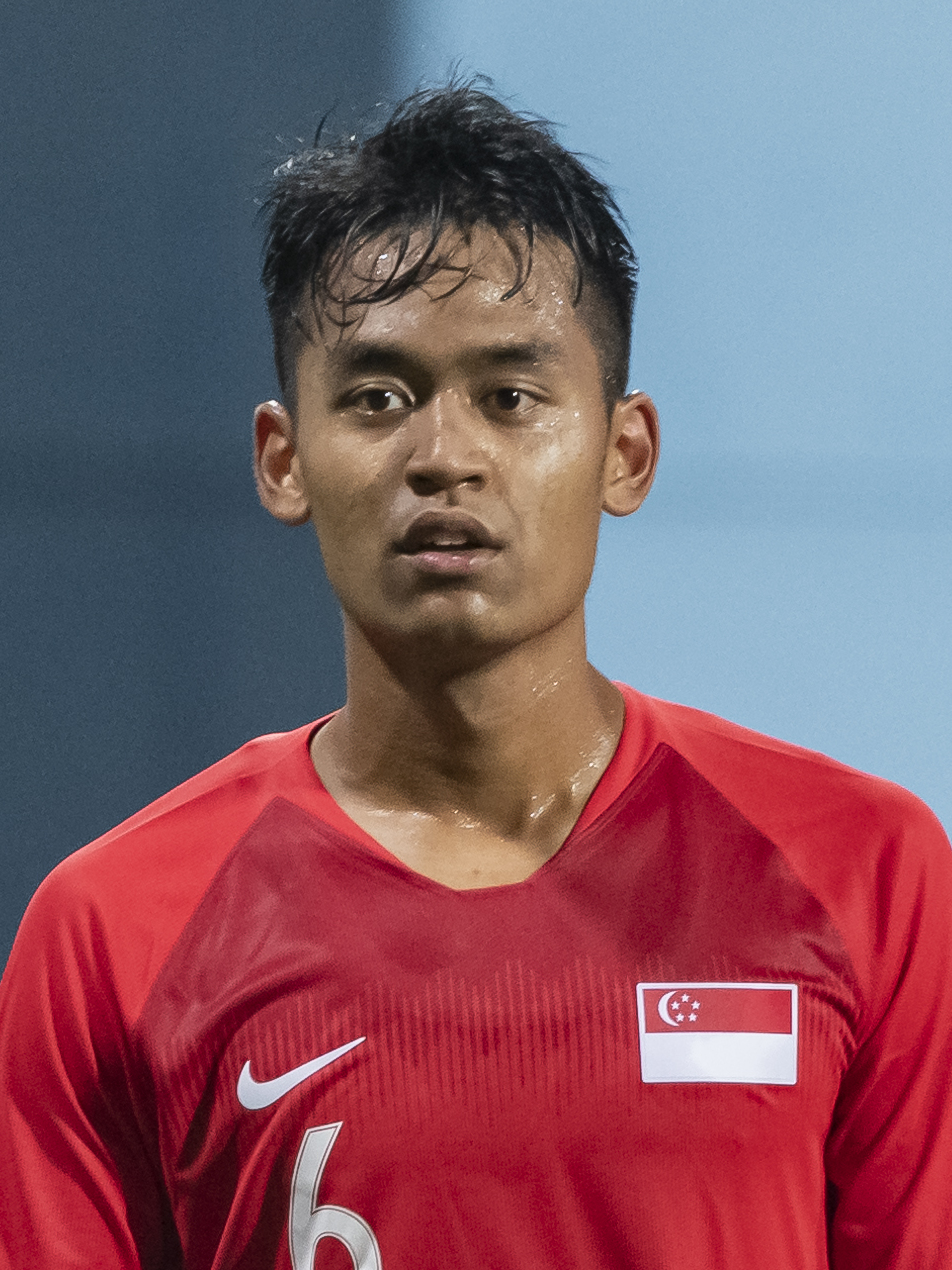
- Amirul playing for Singapore in 2019

Personal information
- Full name: Muhammad Amirul Adli bin Azmi
- Date of birth: 13 January 1996 (age 30)
- Place of birth: Singapore
- Height: 1.81 m (5 ft 11 1/2 in)
- Positions: Full-back; centre-back

Team information
- Current team: Negeri Sembilan (on loan from Tampines Rovers)
- Number: 15

Youth career
- 2009–2014: National Football Academy

Senior career*
Years	Team	Apps	(Gls)
2014–2017	Young Lions	86	(1)
2018–2020	Tampines Rovers	82	(7)
2021–2022	Lion City Sailors	42	(0)
2023	Geylang International	18	(1)
2024–	Tampines Rovers	42	(2)
2026–	→ Negeri Sembilan (loan)	11	(0)

International career^{‡}
2014–2018	Singapore U23	10	(0)
2014–	Singapore	40	(1)
- * Club domestic league appearances and goals as of 8 June 2026 ‡ National team caps and goals as of 15 October 2025

Muhammad Amirul Adli bin Azmi (born 13 January 1996) is a Singaporean professional footballer who plays as a full-back or a centre-back for Malaysia Super League club Negeri Sembilan, on loan from Tampines Rovers and the Singapore national team.

== Club career ==
=== Young Lions ===
In 2014, Amirul was promoted from the National Football Academy to S.League club, Young Lions. He made his professional career debut in a league match against Balestier Khalsa on 23 February 2014.

On 31 July 2015, Amirul received his first career red card after picking up two yellow cards in a league match against DPMM.

Amirul scored his first career goal on 2 July 2017 in a 2–1 loss against Geylang International.

=== Tampines Rovers ===
After four seasons playing with Young Lions, on 1 December 2017, Amirul was taken by Tampines Rovers for the newly revamped 2018 Singapore Premier League season.

=== Lion City Sailors ===
On 21 January 2021, Amirul joined newly privatised club, Lion City Sailors in which he helped them to win the 2021 Singapore Premier League in his debut season and also the 2022 Singapore Community Shield. At the end of the season, he was being linked to Malaysia Super League clubs, Terengganu, Kelantan and Negeri Sembilan were all reported to be interested in the player but nothing materialised.

=== Geylang International ===
On 20 February 2023, Amirul joined Geylang International as a free agent. On 27 May 2023, he scored his first goal for Geylang against his former club, Young Lions.

=== Return to Tampines Rovers ===
On 26 January 2024, Amirul rejoined his former club, Tampines Rovers ahead of the 2024–25 Singapore Premier League season.

==== Loan to Negeri Sembilan ====
On 13 January 2026, Amirul joined Malaysia Super League club Negeri Sembilan until the end of the 2025–26 season. Negeri Sembilan who has been in interested in the player since 2023 has finally finalised a deal with Amirul to joined the club. He make his debut for the club in a league match against Selangor on the next day.

== International career ==
Amirul was first called up to the Singapore national team against Papua New Guinea and Hong Kong in 2014. He made his international debut against Papua New Guinea on 6 September 2014, replacing Afiq Yunos in the 46th minute. He got his second cap in a 2–0 win against Laos on 13 November 2014, replacing Baihakki Khaizan in the 87th minute. He then got his third cap a few days later against Cambodia in a 4–2 on 17 November 2014, replacing Safuwan Baharudin in the 90th minute.

Amirul's first major senior tournament was the 2014 AFF Championship, making him the youngest player in the national team at age 18. His fourth cap came in the Singapore's last match of the 2014 AFF Championship against Malaysia replacing Shahfiq Ghani in the 76th minute. The game ended in a 3–1 loss to Singapore and was Amirul's first international loss with the national team. He got a couple of call ups in 2015 but did not feature for the team in that year.

Amirul was part of the 2018 AFF Championship, 2020 AFF Championship and 2022 AFF Championship squads.

On 5 June 2025, Amirul scored his first international goal in a friendly match against Maldives in a 3–1 win.

=== Others ===
He was selected in the Singapore national squad for The Sultan of Selangor's Cup to be held on 24 August 2019.

== Career statistics ==
=== Club ===
As of match played 8 June 2026. Caps and goals may not be correct.

Club	Season	S.League		Singapore Cup		League Cup Charity Shield		Asia		Total	
Club	Season	Apps	Goals	Apps	Goals	Apps	Goals	Apps	Goals	Apps	Goals
Young Lions	2014	22	0	0	0	0	0	—		22	0
Young Lions	2015	25	0	0	0	0	0	—		25	0
Young Lions	2016	16	0	1	0	-	-	—		17	0
Young Lions	2017	22	1	0	0	0	0	—		22	1
Young Lions	Total	85	1	1	0	0	0	0	0	86	1
Tampines Rovers	2018	23	4	2	0	0	0	6	0	31	4
Tampines Rovers	2019	23	1	5	1	0	0	6	0	34	2
Tampines Rovers	2020	12	1	0	0	1	0	4	0	17	1
Tampines Rovers	Total	58	6	7	1	1	0	16	0	82	7
Lion City Sailors	2021	16	0	0	0	0	0	0	0	16	0
Lion City Sailors	2022	26	0	0	0	1	0	6	0	33	0
Lion City Sailors	Total	42	0	0	0	1	0	6	0	49	0
Geylang International	2023	18	1	4	0	0	0	0	0	22	1
Tampines Rovers	2024–25	17	0	0	0	0	0	6	1	23	1
Tampines Rovers	2025–26	3	0	2	0	1	0	5	0	11	0
Tampines Rovers	Total	20	0	2	0	1	0	11	1	34	1
Malaysia		M-League		Malaysia FA Cup		Malaysia Cup		—		Total	
Negeri Sembilan (loan)	2025–26	11	0	0	0	3	0	—		14	0
Career total		234	8	14	1	5	0	33	1	286	10

- Young Lions are ineligible for qualification to AFC competitions in their respective leagues.
- Young Lions withdrew from the Singapore Cup and Singapore League Cup in 2011 due to scheduled participation in the 2011 AFF U-23 Youth Championship.

=== International ===
Appearances and goals by national team and year
National team	Year	Apps	Goals
Singapore
Singapore	2014	4	0
Singapore	2019	7	0
Singapore	2021	3	0
Total		14	0

==== International goals ====
No	Date	Venue	Opponent	Score	Result	Competition
1	5 June 2025	Bishan Stadium, Singapore	Maldives	1–0	3–1	Friendly

== Honours ==
Tampines Rovers

- Singapore Cup: 2019
- Singapore Community Shield: 2020, 2025

Lion City Sailors

- Singapore Premier League: 2021
- Singapore Community Shield: 2022
