= Hafiz Abu Sujad =

Singaporean footballer (born 1990)

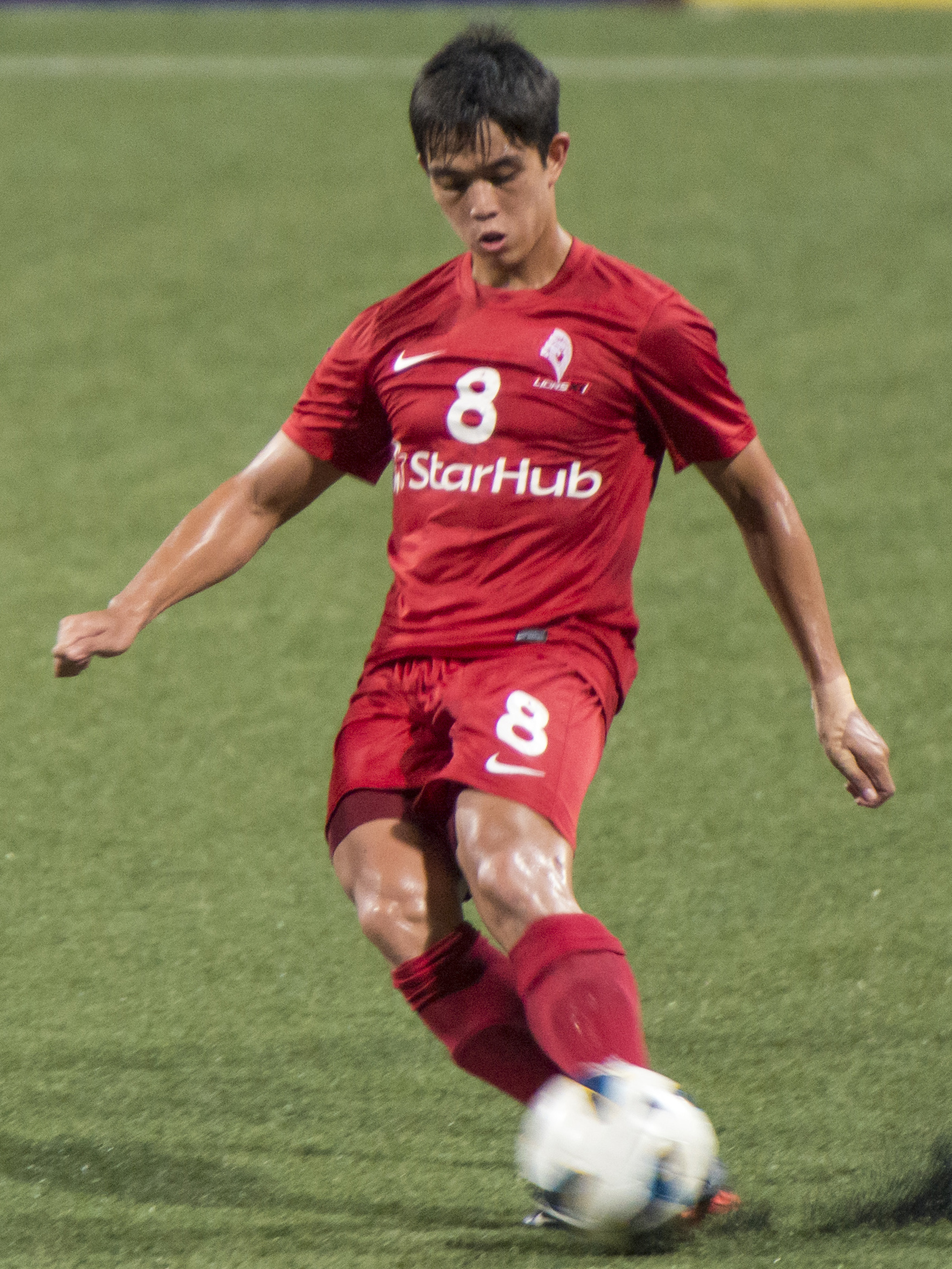
- Hafiz in 2013

Personal information
- Full name: Muhammad Hafiz bin Abu Sujad
- Date of birth: 1 November 1990 (age 36)
- Place of birth: Singapore
- Height: 1.72 m (5 ft 7 1/2 in)
- Positions: Left-back; left midfielder

Youth career
- National Football Academy

Senior career*
Years	Team	Apps	(Gls)
2009–2012	Young Lions	68	(2)
2013–2015	LionsXII	24	(1)
2016	Tampines Rovers	20	(2)
2017	BBCU	7	(0)
2017	Tampines Rovers	15	(4)
2018	Johor Darul Ta'zim II	10	(0)
2018	Tampines Rovers	19	(2)
2019–2022	Hougang United	27	(4)

International career^{‡}
2012–2021	Singapore	44	(1)
Medal record
Men's football
Representing Singapore
Sea Games
Bronze medal – third place	Naypyidaw 2013	Football
- * Club domestic league appearances and goals as of 16:41 at 08 October 2019 ‡ National team caps and goals as of 21:48, 11 June 2021 (UTC)

Muhammad Hafiz bin Abu Sujad (born 1 November 1990) is a former footballer who played in the Singapore Premier League and Malaysia Super League. He is a versatile player who can play in midfield or defence. He captained Young Lions, playing as a left-back prior to signing for LionsXII in 2013. With LionsXII, he began to play in more advanced positions in left and central midfield.

== Club career ==
=== Young Lions ===
Hafiz began his professional football career with Under-23 side Young Lions in the S.League in 2009.

=== LionsXII ===
In December 2011, the FAS announced that Hafiz was to join the newly formed LionsXII for the 2012 Malaysia Super League.

=== Tampines Rovers ===
In 2016, Hafiz signed for Tampines Rovers for the 2016 S.League campaign after LionsXII was disbanded in 2015. He had a stellar season with the Stags, earning him a nomination for the 2016 S.League Player of the Season award. In December, Hafiz went to Thailand for trials with Thai League 2 sides BBCU F.C. and Sisaket F.C.

=== BBCU ===
The 2017 season saw Hafiz seal a move to Thai Division 2 side BBCU F.C. on an initial one-year contract after he impressed on a trial there in December 2016.

=== Tampines Rovers ===
After leaving BBCU, Hafiz had signed a deal to return to Tampines Rovers and will be wearing the no.18 shirt which had been vacated by fellow Singapore International, Yasir Hanapi who had moved to PDRM in Malaysia.

=== JDT II ===
Hafiz next moved to Malaysia Premier League side JDT II for the 2018 season. Despite being on trial with Super League side Melaka United, Melaka opted for fellow Singapore international, Shahdan Sulaiman, instead, leaving Hafiz to seek a move to JDT II.

=== Return to Tampines ===
Hafiz rejoins Tampines Rovers on Singapore Premier League deadline day for registration, 13 April 2018.

== International career ==
Hafiz made his international debut on 16 October 2012, coming on as a substitute against India in a friendly match.

== Personal life ==
Hafiz comes from a sporting family. His father, Abu Sujad is a former Singapore international left-back while his mother, Norija, is a housewife. His sister Nurhafizah, is a former national netballer and became the Lions' physiotherapist. His older brother Nadzi, played in the S.League player with Balestier Central.

Hafiz's uncle is Mat Noh, a Malaysia Cup winner with Singapore and his cousin is Fandi Ahmad, former Singapore national player and former interim head coach of the Singapore national football team.

== Career statistics ==
=== Club ===
As of match played 10 Oct 2021. Caps and goals may not be correct.

Club	Season	S.League		Singapore Cup		Singapore League Cup		Asia		Total	
Club	Season	Apps	Goals	Apps	Goals	Apps	Goals	Apps	Goals	Apps	Goals
Young Lions	2009	8	0	—		—		—		8	0
Young Lions	2010	21	1	4	1	1	0	—		26	2
Young Lions	2011	17	0	—		—		—		17	0
Young Lions	2012	22	1	—		4	1	—		26	2
Young Lions	Total	68	2	4	1	5	1	0	0	77	4
Club	Season	Malaysia Super League		Malaysia FA Cup		Malaysia Cup		Asia		Total	
LionsXII	2013	18	0	1	0	7	2	—		26	2
LionsXII	2014	14	1	2	0	0	0	—		16	1
LionsXII	Total	24	1	3	0	7	2	0	0	34	3
Club	Season	S.League		Singapore Cup		Singapore League Cup		Asia		Total	
Tampines Rovers	2016	20	2	5	3	0	0	10	2	35	7
Tampines Rovers	Total	45	4	9	3	3	0	10	2	67	9
Club	Season	Thai League		FA Cup		League Cup		Asia		Total	
BBCU F.C.	2017	7	0	0	0	0	0	0	0	7	0
BBCU F.C.	Total	7	0	0	0	0	0	0	0	7	0
Club	Season	S.League		Singapore Cup		Singapore League Cup		Asia		Total	
Tampines Rovers	2017	13	2	2	0	3	0	0	0	18	2
Tampines Rovers	2018	12	0	2	0	0	0	0	0	14	0
Tampines Rovers	Total	45	4	9	3	3	0	10	2	67	9
Club	Season	Malaysia Premier League		Malaysia FA Cup		Malaysia Cup		Asia		Total	
Johor Darul Ta'zim II F.C.	2018	8	0	0	0	0	0	0	0	8	0
Johor Darul Ta'zim II F.C.	Total	8	0	0	0	0	0	0	0	8	0
Hougang United	2019	19	2	2	0	0	0	0	0	21	2
Hougang United	2020	11	0	0	0	0	0	3	0	14	0
Hougang United	2021	14	4	0	0	0	0	0	0	14	4
Hougang United	2022	0	0	0	0	0	0	0	0	0	0
Hougang United	Total	44	6	2	0	0	0	3	0	49	6
Career total		144	9	14	4	12	3	13	2	181	18

- Young Lions and LionsXII are ineligible for qualification to AFC competitions in their respective leagues.
- Young Lions withdrew from the 2011 and 2012 Singapore Cup, and the 2011 Singapore League Cup due to participation in AFC and AFF youth competitions.

=== International ===
Singapore national team
Year	Apps	Goals
2012	1	0
2013	5	0
2014	2	0
Total	8	0

Statistics accurate as of match played 5 March 2014

== Honours ==
=== Club ===
LionsXII

- Malaysia Super League: 2013
- Malaysia FA Cup: 2015
