= Jordan Vestering =

Singaporean association football player

Personal information
- Full name: Jordan Nicolas Vestering
- Date of birth: 25 September 2000 (age 26)
- Place of birth: Singapore
- Position: Left-back

Team information
- Current team: Hougang United
- Number: 3

Youth career
- 2008–2011: Tampines Rovers
- 2011–2013: JSSL Arsenal
- 2013–2017: NFA
- 2017–2018: Hougang United

Senior career*
Years	Team	Apps	(Gls)
2018–2020	Hougang United	30	(2)
2022–	Hougang United	43	(2)

International career^{‡}
2015–2016	Singapore U16	10	(1)
2017	Singapore U19	3	(0)
2019	Singapore U22	4	(1)
- * Club domestic league appearances and goals ‡ National team caps and goals as of 13 October 2019

Jordan Nicolas Vestering (born 25 September 2000) is a Singaporean professional footballer who plays primarily as a left-back for Singapore Premier League club Hougang United and the Singapore national team. Considered one of the best left-backs in the league, he is known for his crossing, no-nonsense and aggressive style of play.

== Early career ==
Vestering played at National Football Academy level at the age of 13 to 17 years old. He signed with Hougang United Under-19 team at the start of the 2018 season.

== Club career ==
=== Hougang United ===
Vestering made his first league appearance against Albirex Niigata (S) on 6 May 2018. He scored his first goal for the club in 2019, against Geylang International through a cross by Zulfahmi Arifin. The defender was named one of Singapore's 10 biggest talents by Goal in 2020, making the online publication's NxGn SG list. He left Hougang United in July 2020 to serve in the Singapore Armed Forces and complete his mandatory National services.

On 17 June 2022, Vestering returned to the club during the middle of the season following the conclusion of his NS and get his first start against Johor Darul Ta'zim during the friendly match midway throughout the season for the preparation of the team AFC Cup campaign in Vietnam. On 24 June 2022, He made his first official start for the season in a 2022 AFC Cup game against Cambodian club, Phnom Penh Crown in a 4–3 victory.

On 12 May 2023, Vestering would score his second debut goal for Hougang United in a 3–2 victory against Geylang International after going for a loose ball and rocketing it past Hafiz Ahmad. Vestering would've scored the fastest goal of the season before his 32 seconds mark would be beaten by Albirex Niigata's Seia Kunori months later.

On 26 May 2024, Vestering scored the equaliser goal in the 90+7 injury time to level the scored a 1–1 in a league match against Tanjong Pagar United.

== International career ==
=== Youth ===
Vestering made his debut for the Singapore under-22 on against Fiji on 6 September 2019. He provided an assist for Daniel Goh who scored his first goal.

=== Senior ===
Vestering was invited for the Singapore national team training on 3 and 10 March 2020. This marks his first involvement with the senior side. He made his return to the senior side with an international call up on 8 June 2023.

== Personal life ==
Vestering was born to a Dutch father and a Malay mother. His younger brother, Joaquin Vestering, plays his football with the Singapore Sports School.

== Career statistics ==
As of 14 July 2020

Club	Season	S.League		Singapore Cup		Singapore League Cup		Asia		Total	
Club	Season	Apps	Goals	Apps	Goals	Apps	Goals	Apps	Goals	Apps	Goals
Hougang United	2018	12	0	2	0	0	0	0	0	14	0
Hougang United	2019	15	1	3	0	0	0	0	0	18	1
Hougang United	2020	3	1	0	0	1	0	1	0	5	1
Hougang United	2022	8	0	2	0	0	0	0	0	10	0
Hougang United	2023	15	1	6	0	0	0	4	0	25	1
Hougang United	2024–25	24	1	4	0	0	0	0	0	28	1
Hougang United	2025–26	16	0	4	0	0	0	0	0	20	0
Hougang United	Total	93	4	21	0	1	0	5	0	120	4

== Honours ==
=== Hougang United ===
- Singapore Cup Champions (1): 2022
- Singapore Cup Runner-ups (1): 2023
