= Afiq Yunos =

Singaporean footballer

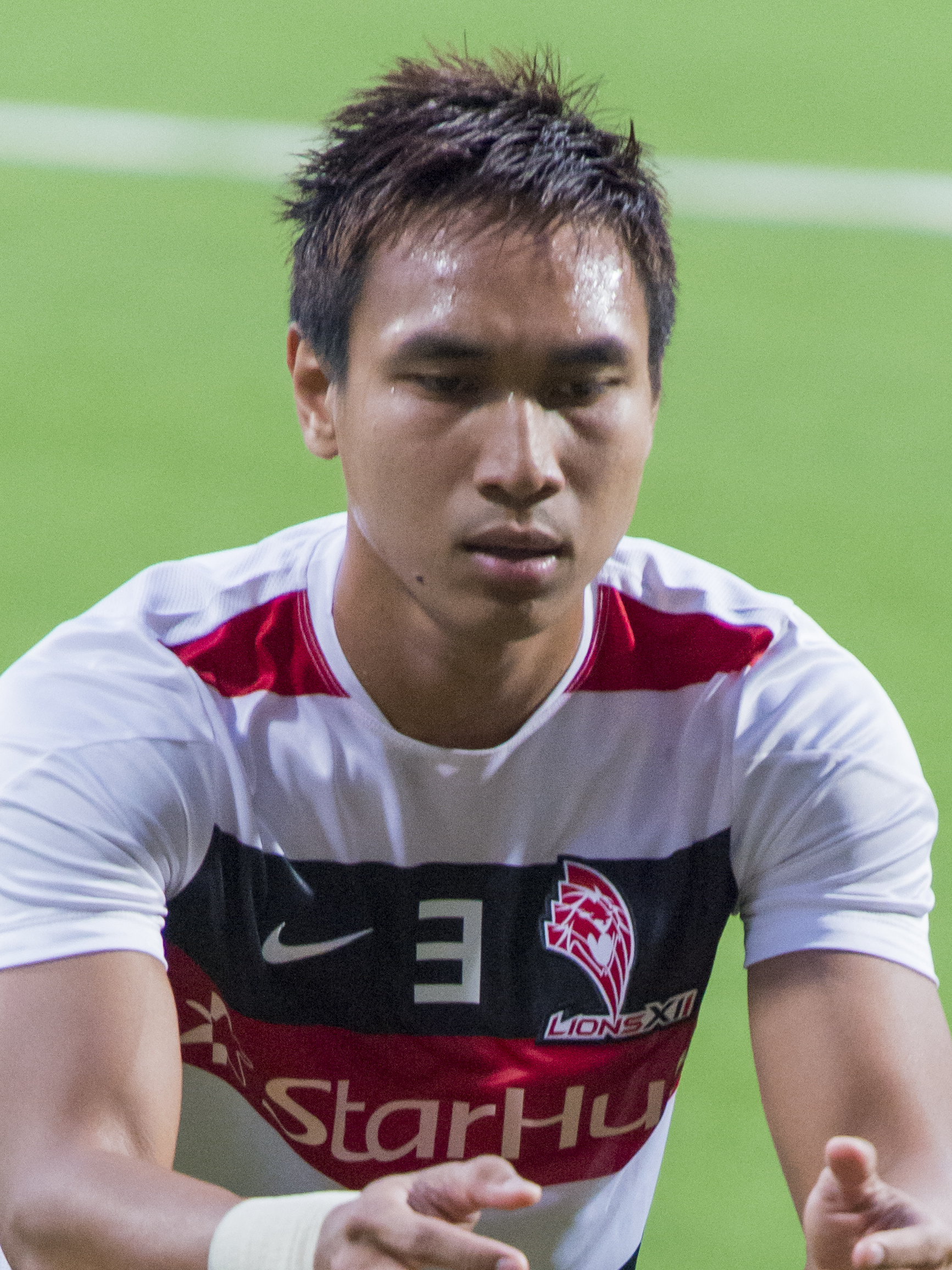
- Afiq in 2014

Personal information
- Full name: Mohammad Afiq bin Yunos
- Date of birth: 10 December 1990 (age 35)
- Place of birth: Singapore
- Height: 1.84 m (6 ft 1/2 in)
- Position: Centre-back

Senior career*
Years	Team	Apps	(Gls)
2008–2013	Young Lions	106	(7)
2014–2015	LionsXII	24	(1)
2016	Tampines Rovers	14	(0)
2017	Lion City Sailors	6	(0)
2018	Tampines Rovers	3	(0)
2018	→ Geylang International (loan)	14	(0)
2019–2021	Hougang United	21	(2)
2020	→ Trat (loan)	1	(0)
2021	Geylang International	6	(0)

International career^{‡}
2009–2013	Singapore U-23		
2010–	Singapore	12	(0)
Medal record
Men's football
Representing Singapore
Sea Games
Bronze medal – third place	Sea Games 2009	Football
Bronze medal – third place	Sea Games 2013	Football
- * Club domestic league appearances and goals as of 18 July 2021 ‡ National team caps and goals as of 22:14, 9 November 2016 (UTC)

Mohammad Afiq bin Yunos (born 10 December 1990) is a Singaporean professional footballer who plays for the Singapore national team as a centre-back.

Before he was included in the LionsXII setup, Afiq was playing with Young Lions in S.League.

== Club career ==
=== Young Lions ===
Afiq began his professional football career with Under-23 side Young Lions in the S.League in 2008.

=== LionsXII ===
It was announced that Afiq was to join the LionsXII for the 2014 Malaysia Super League.

=== Tampines Rovers ===
In 2016, Afiq signed for Tampines Rovers for the 2016 S.League campaign after LionsXII was disbanded in 2015. He has rejoined the Stags by signing a three-year contract from the 2018 season, having spent 2017 playing for Home United.

=== Geylang International ===
Afiq was loaned out to Geylang International in June 2018 from Tampines Rovers for the rest of the season.

=== Hougang United ===
Afiq signed with Hougang United for the 2019 season, joining a slew of big-name signings for the club.

=== Trat FC ===
Afiq then signed for Thailand side Trat FC for the 2020 Thai League 1 season, on loan from the Cheetahs.

=== Geylang International ===
On 8 July 2021, Afiq return to Geylang International on a permanent transfer from Hougang United for the remainder of the 2021 season.

== Career statistics ==
=== Club ===
As of match played 10 Oct 2021. Caps and goals may not be correct.

Club	Season	S.League		Singapore Cup		Singapore League Cup		Asia		Total	
Club	Season	Apps	Goals	Apps	Goals	Apps	Goals	Apps	Goals	Apps	Goals
Tampines Rovers	2016	14	0	2	1	0	0	8	2	25	3
Tampines Rovers	Total	14	0	2	1	0	0	8	2	25	3
Home United	2017	6	0	2	0	0	0	5	1	12	1
Home United	Total	6	0	2	0	0	0	5	1	12	1
Tampines Rovers	2018	3	0	0	0	0	0	6	0	9	0
Tampines Rovers	Total	3	0	0	0	0	0	6	0	9	0
Geylang International (on loan)	2018	10	0	2	0	0	0	0	0	12	0
Geylang International (on loan)	Total	10	0	2	0	0	0	0	0	12	0
Hougang United	2019	19	2	2	0	0	0	—		21	2
Hougang United	2020	0	0	0	0	0	0	—		0	0
Hougang United	Total	19	2	2	0	0	0	0	0	21	2
Club	Season	Thai League 1		Thai FA Cup		Thai League Cup		Asia		Total	
Trat (on loan)	2020	1	0	0	0	0	0	—		1	0
Trat (on loan)	Total	1	0	0	0	0	0	0	0	1	0
Career total		116	3	9	0	4	0	11	2	141	6

- Young Lions are ineligible for qualification to AFC competitions.

=== International ===
As of December 2016

Singapore national team
Year	Apps	Goals
2013	3	0
2014	3	0
2016	6	0
Total	12	0

== International career ==
He was called to Singapore national football team when the team was participating 2010 AFF Championship. Afiq was also called up to the Singapore U-23 side in the 2013 Southeast Asian Games.

== Others ==
=== Singapore Selection Squad ===
He was selected as part of the Singapore Selection squad for The Sultan of Selangor’s Cup to be held on 6 May 2017.
