= Kong Ho-won =

South Korean footballer

Personal information
- Date of birth: 4 September 1997 (age 29)
- Place of birth: Paju, South Korea
- Height: 1.84 m (6 ft 0 in)
- Position: Defender

Youth career
- –2018: Chung-Ang University

Senior career*
Years	Team	Apps	(Gls)
2019–	Hougang United	21	(1)
- * Club domestic league appearances and goals as of 17:14, 20 October 2019 (UTC)

- Kong Ho-won
- Hangul: 공호원
- RR: Gong Howon
- MR: Kong Howŏn

Kong Ho-won (Korean: 공호원; born 4 September 1997) is a South Korea footballer who used to be a defender for Hougang United. He has retired from professional football since.

== Career statistics ==
=== Club ===
As of 20 October 2019.

Club	Season	League			Cup		Continental		Other		Total	
Club	Season	Division	Apps	Goals	Apps	Goals	Apps	Goals	Apps	Goals	Apps	Goals
Hougang United	2019	Singapore Premier League	21	1	2 (Note: Appearances in the Singapore Cup)	1	–		0	0	23	2
Career total			21	1	2	1	0	0	0	0	23	2
