= Amir Zalani =

Singaporean footballer

Personal information
- Date of birth: 4 December 1996 (age 29)
- Place of birth: Singapore
- Height: 1.65 m (5 ft 5 in)
- Position: Forward

Team information
- Current team: Hougang United
- Number: 24

Senior career*
Years	Team	Apps	(Gls)
2016	Home United		
2017-2019	Hougang United		
2019–2021	Military		
2021–	Hougang United	17	(0)

International career
2016 –	Singapore U22		
- * Club domestic league appearances and goals as of 8 April 2016

Amir Zalani is a Singaporean professional footballer who plays either as a striker, right-winger or central-midfielder for Singapore Premier League club Hougang United.

== Club career ==
=== Home United ===
He was promoted to the senior squad in 2016 after impressing with the prime league team. He was the captain of the prime league team and played 19 games (with 10 goals) in 2015 prime league team. He scored two goals in the 2016 Singapore FA Cup finals against NFL side Siglap FC and securing his club's second consecutive FA Cup trophy.

He made his senior debut as a substitute on 11 June 2016 in a draw against Gerena Young Lions.

=== Hougang United ===
Zalani left Home United to join Hougang United in 2017.

On 10 June 2021, Amir returned to Hougang United after completing his national service duty. He will be wearing jersey number 24.

== International career ==
He was called up to represent Singapore's U21 team in 2017.

== Honours ==
=== Club ===
Hougang United

- Singapore Cup: 2022
