= Irwan Shah =

Singaporean footballer

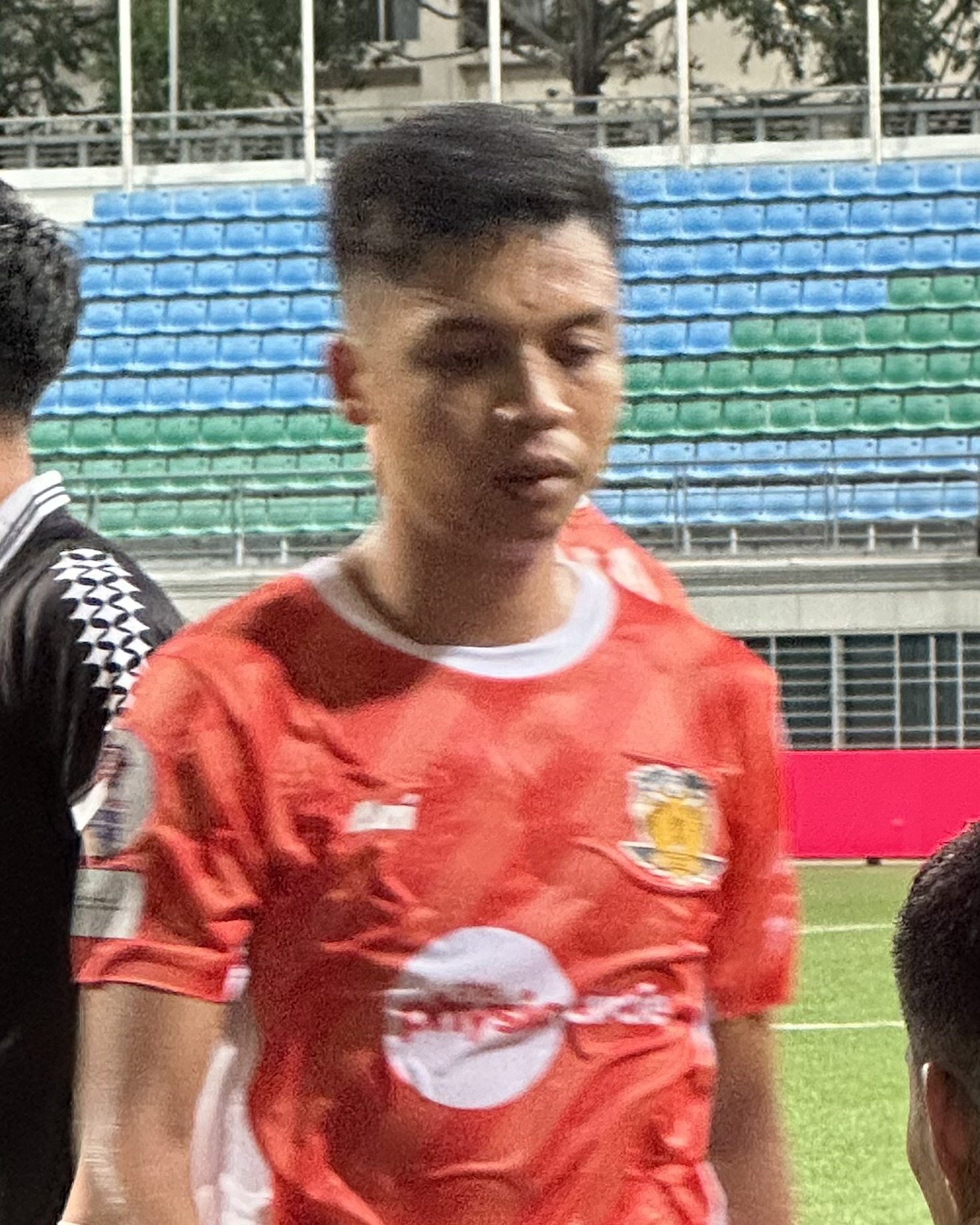
- Irwan Shah with Hougang United in 2023

Personal information
- Full name: Muhammad Irwan Shah bin Arismail
- Date of birth: 2 November 1988 (age 37)
- Place of birth: Singapore
- Height: 1.70 m (5 ft 7 in)
- Positions: Midfielder; defender

Senior career*
Years	Team	Apps	(Gls)
2009–2011	Young Lions	62	(0)
2012–2013	LionsXII	38	(2)
2014–2015	Warriors	53	(0)
2016–2022	Tampines Rovers	141	(6)
2023	Hougang United	21	(0)

International career^{‡}
2010–	Singapore	24	(0)
Medal record
Men's football
Representing Singapore
Sea Games
Bronze medal – third place	Sea Games 2009	Football
Asean Football Championship
Winner	AFF Suzuki Cup 2012	2012
- * Club domestic league appearances and goals as of 21 May 2009 ‡ National team caps and goals as of 11 June 2019

Muhammad Irwan Shah Bin Arismail (born 2 November 1988) is a Singaporean former footballer who last played as a central-midfielder. Mainly a central-midfielder, Irwan has also been positioned as a full-back, and occasionally as a centre-back when needed.

== Club career ==
=== LionsXII ===
Irwan helped LionsXII in making history as the first foreign club to win the 2013 Malaysia Super League.

=== Warriors ===
Irwan left LionsXII to join Warriors in 2014 which he helped the club to win the 2014 S.League in his first season.

=== Tampines Rovers ===
Irwan scored his first goal for Tampines Rovers in a friendly match against Terengganu FA on 14 January 2017. He was also included in the 2019 Singapore Premier League Team of the Year. On 2 November 2019, Irwan scored in the 2019 Singapore Cup Final helping the club to clinch the trophy.

=== Hougang United ===
After 6 years at Tampines, He joined Hougang United in 2023.

== Honours ==
=== Club ===
LionsXII

- Malaysia Super League: 2013

Warriors

- S.League: 2014

Tampines Rovers

- Singapore Cup: 2019
- Singapore Community Shield: 2020

==== Hougang United ====
- Singapore Cup Runner-ups (1): 2023

=== International ===
Singapore

- AFF Championship: 2012

=== Individual ===
- Singapore Premier League Team of the Year: 2019

== Club statistics ==
As of 16 March 2022

Club	Season	League			Cup		Continental		Other		Total	
Club	Season	Division	Apps	Goals	Apps	Goals	Apps	Goals	Apps	Goals	Apps	Goals
Young Lions	2009	S.League	24	0	0	0	0	0	0	0	24	0
Young Lions	2010	S.League	12	0	5	0	2	0	0	0	17	0
Young Lions	2011	S.League	26	0	0	0	0	0	0	0	26	0
Young Lions	Total		62	0	5	0	0	0	0	0	67	0
LionsXII	2012	Malaysia Super League	23	2	3	0	9	0	0	0	35	2
LionsXII	2013	Malaysia Super League	15	0	1	0	2	0	0	0	18	0
LionsXII	Total		38	2	4	0	11	0	0	0	53	2
Warriors FC	2014	S.League	26	0	2	0	1	0	0	0	29	0
Warriors FC	2015	S.League	27	0	2	0	2	0	0	0	31	0
Warriors FC	Total		53	0	4	0	3	0	0	0	60	0
Tampines Rovers	2016	S.League	19	0	4	0	5	0	0	0	28	0
Tampines Rovers	2017	S.League	16	1	2	0	2	0	5	0	25	1
Tampines Rovers	2018	Singapore Premier League	21	1	2	0	6	0	0	0	29	1
Tampines Rovers	2019	Singapore Premier League	24	2	6	1	6	2	0	0	36	5
Tampines Rovers	2020	Singapore Premier League	14	1	0	0	4	0	1	1	19	2
Tampines Rovers	2021	Singapore Premier League	20	1	0	0	0	0	5	0	25	1
Tampines Rovers	2022	Singapore Premier League	27	0	0	0	0	0	2	0	29	0
Tampines Rovers	Total		141	6	14	1	23	2	13	1	191	10
Hougang United	2023	Singapore Premier League	21	0	0	0	0	0	1	0	22	0
Hougang United	Total		21	0	0	0	0	0	1	0	22	0
Career total			309	7	27	1	32	2	13	0	382	10

== Others ==
=== Singapore Selection Squad ===
He was selected as part of the Singapore Selection squad for The Sultan of Selangor's Cup to be held on 24 August 2019.
