= Afiq Noor =

Singaporean footballer

Personal information
- Full name: Muhammad Afiq bin Mat Noor
- Date of birth: 25 December 1993 (age 32)
- Place of birth: Singapore
- Position: Midfielder

Team information
- Current team: Tiong Bahru FC
- Number: 4

Senior career*
Years	Team	Apps	(Gls)
2013–2015	Young Lions	51	(1)
2016–2022	Hougang United	32	(1)
2023–	Tiong Bahru FC	0	(0)

International career
2015	Singapore U23		
- * Club domestic league appearances and goals as of 02:14, 23 November 2014 (UTC)

Muhammad Afiq bin Mat Noor (born 25 December 1993) is a Singaporean professional footballer who played as a central midfielder for Singapore Premier League club Hougang United FC. A versatile player, Afiq is capable of play as a winger, striker, full-back and occasionally as a centre-back.

== Career ==
=== Young Lions FC ===
Formerly from the Warriors's prime league, he represented Singapore in 2012 in the regional finals of the Nike "The Chance" which were held in Jakarta together with Faris Ramli and Sim Li Ming.

He made his senior debut for Courts Young Lions on 20 February 2013 and go on to play 51 times for the lions.

=== Hougang United ===
In 2016, he signed for the Cheetah after being released by the Young Lions.

For 2017, he will continue his career with the Cheetah after signing an extension with the team.

=== Tiong Bahru FC ===
Afiq Noor joined Singapore Football League 1 club, Tiong Bahru FC.

== International career ==
He was the captain for the Under-21 National Team that took part in the Vietnam Youth Newspaper Cup in October 2015.

He was also part of the 2015 SEA Games Football Squad.

=== Club ===
As of match played 10 Oct 2021. Caps and goals may not be correct.

Club	Season	S.League		Singapore Cup		Singapore League Cup		Asia		Total	
Club	Season	Apps	Goals	Apps	Goals	Apps	Goals	Apps	Goals	Apps	Goals
Young Lions	2013	0	0	0	0	0	0	—		3	0
Young Lions	2014	0	0	0	0	0	0	—		4	0
Young Lions	2015	0	0	0	0	0	0	—		0	0
Young Lions	Total	0	0	0	0	0	0	0	0	7	0
Hougang United	2016	13	0	0	0	4	0	—		17	0
Hougang United	2017	10	0	3	0	2	0	—		15	0
Hougang United	Total	23	0	3	0	6	0	0	0	32	0
Tiong Bahru FC	2018	0	0	0	0	0	0	0	0	0	0
Tiong Bahru FC	Total	0	0	0	0	0	0	0	0	0	0
Hougang United	2019	17	0	3	0	0	0	0	0	20	0
Hougang United	2020	13	0	0	0	1	0	3	0	17	0
Hougang United	2021	14	1	0	0	0	0	0	0	14	1
Hougang United	2022	0	0	0	0	0	0	0	0	0	0
Hougang United	Total	44	1	3	0	1	0	3	0	51	1
Career total		142	4	7	0	5	0	14	2	169	7

- Young Lions are ineligible for qualification to AFC competitions.

== Honours ==
=== Club ===
Hougang United

- Singapore Cup: 2022
