= Mahathir Azeman =

Singaporean football player (born 1996)

Personal information
- Full name: Mahathir Azeman
- Date of birth: 17 January 1996 (age 30)
- Place of birth: Singapore
- Position: Midfielder

Youth career
- 2013–2014: Boavista Sport Club

Senior career*
Years	Team	Apps	(Gls)
2015	Balestier Khalsa	0	(0)
2015–2017	Home United	7	(0)
2017	Balestier Khalsa	0	(0)
2019—2020	Hougang United	11	(2)

International career
2016	Singapore U22		
- * Club domestic league appearances and goals as of November 10, 2017

Mahathir Azeman is a Singaporean former footballer widely known as the first Singaporean to play football professionally in Brazil, having been involved in the U23 reserve team for Boavista SC.

== Club career ==
=== Youth ===
==== Boavista ====
After his impressive performances in the Lion City Cup, he was brought by former S.League player and head coach of his secondary school team, Fabio Fanticelle Da Silva, for a training stint with Brazilian side Boavista Sport Club. After initially impressing on a five-month stint, Mahathir was handed a one-year extension to his contract. He impressed so much that he was given the No. 10 shirt, an honour in Brazilian football. He was also the youngest member, at 18, to link up with the Under-21 squad.

Mahathir is also a trailblazer for young Singaporean footballers as following his stint at Boavista, the Brazilian club once again handed two young Singaporean footballers, Ryan Goh and Winchell Ng, six-month contracts after they impressed on a one-month stint.

Mahathir returned to Singapore after an 18-month stint in Brazil to fulfill his National Service (NS) obligations. However, he has received an open invitation to return to Boavista following the completion of his NS.

=== Senior ===
==== Balestier Khalsa ====
Following his return to Singapore, Mahathir trained with S.League side Balestier Khalsa, who had partially sponsored his trip to Brazil.

==== Home United ====
He joined Home after enlisting for NS in the Singapore Police Force and linked up with the Home United prime league squad. Mahathir was trusted by the then-coach, Philippe Aw. His first game was against the Young Lions, which Home won 2–0.

Following Philippe Aw's promotion to Head Coach of the 1st team squad, Mahathir was also given chances to play for the first team in 2015 despite being registered only for the Prime League team.

He was retained for the 2017 S.League season.

== International career ==
Mahathir was a key player for the Singapore national U15 football team that finished third in the 2011 Lion City Cup.

He was called up to the Singapore national under-19 football team for the 2013 AFF U-19 Youth Championship.

He had his sights trained on earning a spot in the Singapore national under-23 football team that was due to play in the 2015 SEA Games on local soil and had his chances boosted when he was called up to the under-22 side that was gearing up for Olympics qualification. However, he was injured during training with Balestier and was ruled out for six months, missing out on the 2015 SEA Games in the process.

He was called up to the 2016 Sultan of Selangor Cup Squad to face Selangor FA. Mahathir was also called up to the Singapore national under-21 football team in 2016.

== Career statistics ==
As of 21 April 2017

Club	Season	S.League		Singapore Cup		League Cup		ACL		AFC Cup		Total	
Club	Season	Apps	Goals	Apps	Goals	Apps	Goals	Apps	Goals	Apps	Goals	Apps	Goals
Home United	2015	0	0	0	0	0	0	—				0	0
Home United	2016	7	0	1	0	3	0	—				11	0
Home United	2017	0	0	0	0	0	0	—		0	0	0	0
Home United	Total	7	0	1	0	3	0	0	0	0	0	11	0
Hougang United	2019	5	2	0	0	0	0	0	0	0	0	5	2
Hougang United	2020	0	0	0	0	0	0	0	0	0	0	0	0
Hougang United	Total	5	2	0	0	0	0	0	0	0	0	5	2
Career total		12	2	1	0	3	0	0	0	0	0	16	2
