= 2018 Hougang United FC season =

Hougang United
2018 season
- Chairman: Bill Ng
- Head coach: Clement Teo
- Stadium: Hougang Stadium

The 2018 season was Hougang United's 21st consecutive season in the top flight of Singapore football and in the S.League. Along with the S.League, the club will also compete in the Singapore Cup.

== Squad ==
=== S.League Squad ===
No.	Name	Nationality	Date of birth (age)	Previous club
Goalkeepers
1	Zulfairuuz Rudy	(Singapore)	22 May 1994 (age 32)	(Singapore) Home United
13	Ridhuan Barudin ^{>30}	(Singapore)	23 March 1987 (age 39)	(Singapore) Tampines Rovers
18	Khairulhin Khalid	(Singapore)	18 July 1991 (age 35)	(Singapore) LionsXII
Defenders
2	Asraf Zahid ^{U23}	(Singapore)	8 October 1999 (age 26)	Youth Team
3	Gerald Ting ^{U23}	(Singapore)	3 March 1999 (age 27)	Youth Team
4	Ashrul Syafeeq	(Singapore)	11 April 1994 (age 32)	(Singapore) Balestier Khalsa
11	Nazrul Nazari	(Singapore)	11 February 1991 (age 35)	(Singapore) LionsXII
15	Illyas Lee ^{U23}	(Singapore)	1 December 1995 (age 30)	(Singapore) Young Lions FC
17	Faiz Salleh	(Singapore)	17 July 1992 (age 34)	(Singapore) Young Lions FC
32	Syaqir Sulaiman	(Singapore)	12 August 1986 (age 40)	(Singapore) Warriors FC
59	Jordan Nicolas Vestering ^{U19}	(Singapore) (Netherlands)	25 September 2000 (age 26)	(Singapore) NFA U18
Midfielders
6	Syahiran Miswan	(Singapore)	22 January 1994 (age 32)	(Singapore) Home United
8	Jordan Chan ^{U23}	(Singapore)	5 March 1998 (age 28)	(Singapore) Young Lions FC
10	Stanely Ng	(Singapore)	27 May 1992 (age 34)	(Singapore) Geylang International
12	Fabian Kwok	(Singapore)	17 March 1989 (age 37)	(Singapore) Tampines Rovers
16	Justin Hui ^{U23}	(Singapore)	17 February 1998 (age 28)	Youth Team
19	Nurhilmi Jasni ^{>30}	(Singapore)	17 December 1986 (age 39)	(Singapore) Balestier Khalsa
20	Muhaimin Suhaimi ^{U23}	(Singapore)	20 February 1995 (age 31)	(Singapore) Young Lions FC
Strikers
7	Fareez Farhan	(Singapore)	29 July 1994 (age 32)	(Singapore) Young Lions FC
9	Antonie Viterale	(Italy) (France)	1 July 1996 (age 30)	(Italy) Hellas Verona
14	Iqbal Hussain	(Singapore)	6 June 1993 (age 33)	(Singapore) Young Lions FC
21	Syukri Bashir ^{U23}	(Singapore)	11 April 1998 (age 28)	Youth Team
23	Amir Zalani ^{U23}	(Singapore)	4 December 1996 (age 29)	(Singapore) Home United
24	Shahfiq Ghani	(Singapore)	17 March 1992 (age 34)	(Singapore) Geylang International
25	Daniel Goh Ji Xiong ^{U23}	(Singapore)	13 August 1999 (age 27)	Youth Team
26	Jang Jo-yoon	(South Korea)	1 January 1988 (age 38)	(South Korea) Gimpo Citizen FC
33	Fazrul Nawaz	(Singapore)	17 April 1985 (age 41)	(Singapore) Tampines Rovers
Players loaned out / placed on injury list / left during season
5	Adam Mitter	(England)	5 January 1993 (age 33)	(Philippines) Ilocos United
22	Nasrul Taib ^{U23}	(Singapore)	10 October 1997 (age 28)	Youth Team

== Coaching staff ==
2018

Position	Name	Ref.
Head coach	(Singapore) Clement Teo	
Assistant coach	(Singapore) Salim Moin	
Head of Youth (COE)	(Singapore) Robin Chitrakar	
Fitness coach	(Germany) Dirk Schauenberg	
Goalkeeping coach	(Singapore) Lim Queen Cher	
General Manager	(Singapore) Matthew Tay	
Team manager	(Singapore) Clement Teo	
Sports trainer	(Singapore) Thomas Pang	
Sports trainer	(Singapore) Ryan Wang	
Kitman	(Singapore) Wan Azlan	

== Transfers ==
=== Pre-season transfers ===
==== ln ====
Position	Player	Transferred from	Ref
DF	(Singapore) Ashrul Syafeeq	(Singapore) Hougang United	
DF	(Singapore) Illyas Lee	(Singapore) Garena Young Lions	
DF	(England) Adam Mitter	(Philippines) Ilocos United	
MF	(Singapore) Jordan Chan	(Singapore) Garena Young Lions	
MF	(Singapore) Muhaimin Suhaimi	(Singapore) Garena Young Lions	2 Years contract
MF	(Singapore) Stanely Ng	(Singapore) Geylang International	
FW	(Singapore) Shahfiq Ghani	(Singapore) Geylang International	2 Years contract

==== Out ====
Position	Player	Transferred To	Ref
DF	(Singapore) Delwinder Singh	(Singapore) Warriors FC	
DF	(Singapore) Zulfahmi Arifin	(Thailand) Chonburi	
DF	(Japan) Atsushi Shirota	(Cambodia) Phnom Penh Crown FC	
DF	(Singapore) Amer Hakeem	(Singapore) Garena Young Lions	Season loan
DF	(Singapore) Ariyan Shamsuddin	(Singapore) Garena Young Lions	Season loan
DF	(Singapore) Wahyudi Wahid		
DF	(Singapore) Ali Hudzafi		
DF	(Singapore) Lionel Tan	(Singapore) SAFSA (NFL Club)	Season loan
DF	(Singapore) Shaqi Sulaiman	(Singapore) Balestier Khalsa	
MF	(Singapore) Gareth Low Jun Kit	(Singapore) SAFSA (NFL Club)	Season loan
MF	(Singapore) Prakash Raj	(Singapore) Garena Young Lions	Season loan
MF	(Japan) Fumiya Kogure	(Singapore) Geylang International	
MF	(Singapore) Azhar Sairudin	(Singapore) Geylang International	
MF	(Singapore) Fairoz Hasan	(Singapore) Geylang International	
MF	(Singapore) Afiq Noor	(Singapore) Tiong Bahru FC (NFL Club)	
FW	(Spain) Pablo Rodríguez		

==== Extension ====
Position	Player	Ref
GK	(Singapore) Ridhuan Barudin	
GK	(Singapore) Khairulhin Khalid	2 Years contract
GK	(Singapore) Zulfairuuz Rudy	
DF	(Singapore) Faiz Salleh	
MF	(Singapore) Nurhilmi Jasni	
MF	(Singapore) Nazrul Nazari	
MF	(Singapore) Fabian Kwok	
MF	(Singapore) Syahiran Miswan	
FW	(Singapore) Iqbal Hussain	2 Years contract
FW	(Singapore) Fareez Farhan	
FW	(Singapore) Amir Zalani	

==== Promoted ====
Position	Player	Ref
DF	(Singapore) Gerald Ting	
DF	(Singapore) Asraf Zahid	
MF	(Singapore) Justin Hui	
MF	(Singapore) Nasrul Taib	
FW	(Singapore) Syukri Bashir	
FW	(Singapore) Daniel Goh Ji Xiong	
FW	(Italy) Antonie Viterale	

==== Trial ====
Position	Player	Trial @	Ref

=== Mid-season transfers ===
==== In ====
Position	Player	Transferred From	Ref
DF	(Singapore) Syaqir Sulaiman	(Singapore) Tiong Bahru FC	
FW	(Singapore) Fazrul Nawaz	(Singapore) Hougang United	$50,000
FW	(South Korea) Jang Jo-yoon	(South Korea) Gimpo Citizen FC	Free

==== Out ====
Position	Player	Transferred To	Ref
DF	(England) Adam Mitter	(Philippines) Global Cebu F.C.	Free
MF	(Singapore) Nasrul Taib	(Singapore) Tiong Bahru FC (NFL Club)	Free

==== Trial ====
Position	Player	Trial @	Ref
MF	(Singapore) Joshua de Souza	(Belgium) K.F.C. Vigor Wuitens Hamme (Belgium) KVK Robur	

== Friendlies ==
=== Pre-Season Friendly ===
Win Draw Loss

6 January 2018 1	Hougang United (Singapore)	1–0	Singapore Cricket Club (NFL Club)	Padang
	Justin Hui	Report

21 January 2018 2	Hougang United (Singapore)	3–0	(Singapore) Katong FC (NFL Club)	Jalan Besar Stadium
	Jordan Chan (pen.); Fareez Farhan (pen.); Iqbal Hussain

30 January 2018 3	Hougang United (Singapore)	Cancelled	(Australia) Rydalmere Lions	Jalan Besar Stadium
1700 hours

10 February 2018 4	Hougang United (Singapore)	2–1	(Singapore) Tiong Bahru FC (NFL Club)	Hougang Stadium
1700 hours	Adam Mitter; Iqbal Hussain

25 February 2018 5	Hougang United (Singapore)	8–0	(Singapore) Police SA (NFL Club)	Hougang Stadium
1700 hours

3 March 2018 6	Hougang United (Singapore)	Cancelled	(Singapore) SAFSA (NFL Club)	Hougang Stadium
1700 hours

10 March 2018 7	Hougang United (Singapore)	5–2	(Singapore) Hougang United U-19	Hougang Stadium
1700 hours

24 March 2018 8	Hougang United (Singapore)	Cancelled	(Singapore) Albirex Niigata (S)	Hougang Stadium
1700 hours

=== Surabaya Pre-Season Training ===
4 March 2018 1	Hougang United (Singapore)	0–2	(Indonesia) Madura United	Gelora Ratu Pamelingan Stadium
2000 hours		Report	Nuriddin Davronov 37'; Lamjed Chehoudi 90'

6 March 2018 2	Hougang United (Singapore)	0–2	(Indonesia) PS Mojokerto Putra	Gelora Ratu Pamelingan Stadium

=== Malaysia Pre-season tour ===
22 March 2018 1	Hougang United (Singapore)	4–4	(Malaysia) Melaka United	Hang Jebat Stadium
	Antonie Viterale; Muhaimin Suhaimi; Shahfiq Ghani

24 March 2018 2	Hougang United (Singapore)	1–2	(Malaysia) Johor Darul Ta'zim II F.C.	Pasir Gudang Corporation Stadium
	Shahfiq Ghani 83'		Murilo Damasceno 9', 15'

== Team statistics ==
=== Appearances and goals ===
As of 29 September 2018.

No.	Pos.	Player	Sleague		Singapore Cup		Total	
No.	Pos.	Player	Apps.	Goals	Apps.	Goals	Apps.	Goals
1	GK	(Singapore) Zulfairuuz Rudy	4	0	0	0	4	0
2	DF	(Singapore) Asraf Zahid	1(1)	0	0	0	2	0
3	DF	(Singapore) Gerald Ting	4	0	0	0	4	0
4	DF	(Singapore) Ashrul Syafeeq	6(5)	0	0	0	11	0
6	MF	(Singapore) Syahiran Miswan	13(2)	0	2	0	17	0
7	FW	(Singapore) Fareez Farhan	7(12)	3	1	0	20	3
8	MF	(Singapore) Jordan Chan	0(1)	0	0	0	1	0
9	FW	(Italy) Antonie Viterale	14(5)	1	1(1)	0	21	1
10	MF	(Singapore) Stanley Ng	10(4)	2	0	0	14	2
11	DF	(Singapore) Nazrul Nazari	14(2)	0	1(1)	0	18	0
12	MF	(Singapore) Fabian Kwok	19(3)	3	1	0	23	3
13	GK	(Singapore) Ridhuan Barudin	4(1)	0	2	0	7	0
14	FW	(Singapore) Iqbal Hussain	17(2)	4	2	0	21	4
15	DF	(Singapore) Illyas Lee	21	0	2	0	23	0
16	MF	(Singapore) Justin Hui	13(2)	1	0	0	15	1
17	DF	(Singapore) Faiz Salleh	20	1	2	0	21	1
18	GK	(Singapore) Khairulhin Khalid	16	0	0	0	16	0
19	MF	(Singapore) Nurhilmi Jasni	11(5)	1	1	0	17	1
20	MF	(Singapore) Muhaimin Suhaimi	14(3)	0	2	0	19	0
21	FW	(Singapore) Syukri Bashir	2(6)	0	0(1)	0	9	0
23	FW	(Singapore) Amir Zalani	7(2)	1	0	0	9	1
24	FW	(Singapore) Shahfiq Ghani	8(4)	2	0(2)	0	14	2
25	FW	(Singapore) Daniel Goh Ji Xiong	0(2)	0	0	0	2	0
26	FW	(South Korea) Jang Jo-yoon	5(2)	1	1(1)	0	9	1
32	DF	(Singapore) Syaqir Sulaiman	3(1)	0	0	0	4	0
33	FW	(Singapore) Fazrul Nawaz	4(3)	1	2	0	9	1
57	MF	(Singapore) Nikesh Singh Sidhu	0	0	0	0	0	0
59	DF	(Singapore) Jordan Nicolas Vestering	12	0	2	0	14	0
Players who have played this season and/or sign for the season but had left the club or on loan to other club
5	DF	(England) Adam Mitter	14	1	0	0	14	1
22	MF	(Singapore) Nasrul Taib	1(2)	0	0	0	3	0

== Competitions ==
=== Overview ===
Competition	Record							
Competition	P	W	D	L	GF	GA	GD	Win %
Singapore Premier League	24	2	6	16	22	44	−22	8.33
Singapore Cup	2	0	0	2	0	3	−3	0.00
Total	26	2	6	18	22	47	−25	7.69

=== Singapore Premier League ===
Win Draw Loss

4 April 2018 Round 1	Garena Young Lions (Singapore)	2–0	(Singapore) Hougang United	Jalan Besar Stadium
	Joshua Pereira 34'; Taufiq Muqminin 68'; Prakash Raj (yellow card) 59'		Antonie Viterale (yellow card) 31'; Nurhilmi Jasni (yellow card) 37'; Iqbal Hussain (yellow card) 81'

15 April 2018 Round 2	Hougang United (Singapore)	1–1	(Singapore) Warriors FC	Hougang Stadium
	Fareez Farhan 86' (pen.) (yellow card) 90'; Muhaimin Suhaimi (yellow card) 41'; Fabian Kwok (yellow card) 77'		Ho Wai Loon 39' (yellow card) 34'; Poh Yi Feng (yellow card) 28'; Emmeric Ong (yellow card) 62'; Faiz Salleh (yellow card) 77'

18 April 2018 Round 3	Tampines Rovers (Singapore)	4–0	(Singapore) Hougang United	Our Tampines Hub
	Shameer Aziq 19'; Khairul Amri 24'; Irwan Shah 67'; Jordan Webb 86'; Fahrudin Mustafic (yellow card) 83'

22 April 2018 Round 4	Hougang United (Singapore)	1–1	(Singapore) Balestier Khalsa	Hougang Stadium
	Iqbal Hussain 48'; Fabian Kwok 34'; Syahiran Miswan 61'; Illyas Lee (yellow card) 85'		Keegan Linderboom 9'; Huzaifah Aziz 73'	Referee: Muhammad Taqi Aljaafari Bin Jahari (Singapore)

2 May 2018 Round 5	Hougang United (Singapore)	3–3	(Singapore) Home United	Hougang Stadium
	Iqbal Hussain 57'; Adam Mitter 74'; Faiz Salleh 78'		Song Ui-young 34'; Faritz Abdul Hameed 40' (yellow card) 44'; Shahril Ishak 65'; Anumanthan Kumar (yellow card) 13'; Hafiz Nor (yellow card) 67'

6 May 2018 Round 6	Albirex Niigata (S) (Singapore)	1–0	(Singapore) Hougang United	Jurong East Stadium
	Kenya Takahashi 75'

12 May 2018 Round 7	Hougang United (Singapore)	1–3	(Singapore) Geylang International	Hougang Stadium
	Iqbal Hussain 87'		Shawal Anuar 2', 45'; Azhar Sairudin 75'

19 May 2018 Round 8	Hougang United (Singapore)	1–2	(Singapore) Garena Young Lions	Hougang Stadium
	Fabian Kwok 49'; Illyas Lee (yellow card) 75'; Fareez Farhan (yellow card) 78'		Ikhsan Fandi 57'; Naufal Azman 79'

2 June 2018 Round 9	Warriors FC (Singapore)	2–0	(Singapore) Hougang United	Choa Chu Kang Stadium
	Jonathan Béhé 87' (pen.) 90+3'; Delwinder Singh (yellow card) 10'; Nur Luqman (yellow card) 70'; Poh Yi Feng (yellow card) 77'; Ho Wai Loon (yellow card) 90+1'		Shahfiq Ghani (yellow card) 10'; Fabian Kwok (yellow card) 65'; Jordan Nicolas Vestering (yellow card) 86'

9 June 2018 Round 10	Hougang United (Singapore)	0–2	(Singapore) Tampines Rovers	Hougang Stadium
	Faiz Salleh (yellow card) 60'; Syahiran Miswan (yellow card) 79'; Stanley Ng (yellow card) 86'; Illyas Lee (yellow card) 87'		Fazrul Nawaz 45+1'; Khairul Amri 69'; Shameer Aziq (yellow card) 22' (yellow card) 59' (yellow-red card); Yasir Hanapi (yellow card) 79'

17 June 2018 Round 11	Balestier Khalsa (Singapore)	0–1	(Singapore) Hougang United	Toa Payoh Stadium
	Nurullah Hussein (yellow card) 58'; Sheikh Abdul Hadi (yellow card) 84'; Hazzuwan Halim (yellow card) 90+4'		Nurhilmi Jasni 73'; Illyas Lee (yellow card) 18'; Fabian Kwok (yellow card) 23' Justin Hui (yellow card) 82'; Khairulhin Khalid (yellow card) 90+4'; Jordan Vestering (yellow card) 90+4'

24 June 2018 Round 12	Hougang United (Singapore)	1–1	Brunei DPMM	National Stadium, Singapore
	Stanley Ng 23' (pen.); Nazrul Nazari (yellow card) 25'; Jordan Vestering (yellow card) 42'		Volodymyr Pryyomov 79'; Hendra Azam Idris (yellow card) 18'; Abdul Aziz Tamit (yellow card) 23'	Referee: Nathan Chan (Singapore)

1 July 2018 Round 13	Home United (Singapore)	1–0	(Singapore) Hougang United	Bishan Stadium
	Anumanthan Kumar 57'; Shakir Hamzah (yellow card) 43'		Syahiran Miswan (yellow card) 8'	Referee: Y.Sathyakumar (Singapore)

4 July 2018 Round 14	Hougang United (Singapore)	1–2	(Singapore) Albirex Niigata (S)	Hougang Stadium
	Amir Zalani 88'; Syaqir Sulaiman (yellow card) 23'; Ashrul Syafeeq (yellow card) 57'; Nurhilmi Jasni (yellow card) 59'		Hiroyoshi Kamata 38'; Shuhei Hoshino 69'; Kenya Takahashi (yellow card) 41'; Adam Swandi (yellow card) 90+3'	Referee: Muhammad Zulfiqar (Singapore)

5 August 2018 Round 15 (Rescheduled)	Geylang International (Singapore)	0–3	(Singapore) Hougang United	Bedok Stadium
	Jasper Chan (red card) 52'; Anders Aplin (yellow card) 52'; Yuki Ichikawa (yellow card) 78'		Justin Hui 36'; Fareez Farhan 64'; Jang Jo-yoon 87'; Syahiran Miswan (yellow card) 45+2'; Illyas Lee (yellow card) 53'	Referee: Jansen Foo (Singapore)

11 July 2018 Round 16	Brunei DPMM	3–2	(Singapore) Hougang United	Hassanal Bolkiah National Stadium
	Volodymyr Pryyomov 6'; Adi Said 63'; Shahrazen Said 90' (yellow card) 46'; Fakharrazi Hassan (yellow card) 36'; Hendra Azam Idris (yellow card) 45+1'		Fabien Kwok 31' (yellow card) 45+1'; Fareez Farhan 73'; Muhaimin Suhaimi (yellow card) 2'; Fareez Farhan (yellow card) 89'

14 July 2018 Round 17	Garena Young Lions (Singapore)	3–0	(Singapore) Hougang United	Jalan Besar Stadium
	Hami Syahin 23'; Haiqal Pashia 83'; Ikhsan Fandi 90'; R Aaravin (yellow card) 10'		Jordan Vestering (yellow card) 38' (yellow card) 83' (yellow-red card); Illyas Lee (yellow card) 49'

1 August 2018 Round 18	Hougang United (Singapore)	1–2	(Singapore) Warriors FC	Hougang Stadium
	Iqbal Hussain 48'; Khairulhin Khalid (yellow card) 79'		Kento Fukuda 17'; Jonathan Béhé 78'

12 August 2018 Round 19	Tampines Rovers (Singapore)	1–0	(Singapore) Hougang United	Our Tampines Hub
	Illyas Lee 12' (o.g.)			Referee: W. Ravisanthiran (Singapore)

15 August 2018 Round 20	Hougang United (Singapore)	1–2	(Singapore) Balestier Khalsa	Hougang Stadium
	Antonie Viterale 26'		Zakir Samsudin 73'; Hazzuwan Halim 75'	Referee: Juherman Zaiton (Singapore)

18 August 2018 Round 21	Brunei DPMM	3–1	(Singapore) Hougang United	Hassanal Bolkiah National Stadium
	Abdul Azizi Ali Rahman 3' 44' 45'		Fazrul Nawaz 49'	Referee: W. Ravisanthiran (Singapore)

15 September 2018 Round 22 (Rescheduled)	Hougang United (Singapore)	1–2	(Singapore) Home United	Hougang Stadium
	Shahfiq Ghani 62'		Hafiz Nor 34'; Song Ui-young 84'

23 September 2018 Round 23	Albirex Niigata (S) (Singapore)	2–2	(Singapore) Hougang United	Jurong East Stadium
	Adam Swandi 62'; Shun Kumagai (yellow card) 52' (goal) 86'; Shuhei Hoshino (yellow card) 74'		Stanley Ng 14' (pen.); Shahfiq Ghani 90+2' (yellow card) 25'

29 September 2018 Round 24 (Rescheduled)	Hougang United (Singapore)	1–1	(Singapore) Geylang International	Hougang Stadium
	Fabian Kwok 90+4'		Cameron Ayrton Bell 82'	Referee: Jansen Foo (Singapore)

Pos	Team	Pld	W	D	L	GF	GA	GD	Pts
5	Warriors FC	24	7	7	10	32	35	−3	28
6	Balestier Khalsa	24	7	6	11	25	36	−11	27
7	Young Lions (Note: The two foreign clubs – Albirex Niigata (S) and DPMM FC – as well as the Football Association of Singapore (FAS) under-21 team, Young Lions, are ineligible for any AFC competition spots.)	24	5	6	13	25	46	−21	21
8	Geylang International	24	5	5	14	26	57	−31	20
9	Hougang United	24	2	6	16	22	44	−22	12

Updated to match(es) played on 29 September 2018. Source: Singapore Premier League
Rules for classification: 1) points; 2) goal difference; 3) number of goals scored; 4) number of wins

=== Singapore Cup ===
Win Draw Loss

29 August 2018 Quarter Final 1st Leg	Hougang United (Singapore)	0–1	(Singapore) Albirex Niigata (S)	Hougang Stadium
	Illyas Lee (yellow card) 70'		Kenya Takahashi 74' (yellow card) 42'; Shuhei Hoshino (yellow card) 80'	Referee: G.Letchman (Singapore)

1 September 2018 Quarter Final 2nd Leg	Albirex Niigata (S) (Singapore)	2–0 (3–0 agg.)	(Singapore) Hougang United	Jurong East Stadium
	Taku Morinaga 42' 71'; Shuhei Hoshino (yellow card) 55'; Kenya Takahashi (yellow card) 76'		Jordan Vestering (yellow card) 23'; Fazrul Nawaz (yellow card) 30'; Illyas Lee (yellow card) 40'; Muhaimin Suhaimi (yellow card) 72'; Fabian Kwok (yellow card) 76'; Iqbal Hussain (yellow card) 90+2'	Referee: Ahmad A'Qashah (Singapore)

Hougang United lost 3–0 on aggregate.
