= 2017 Hougang United FC season =

Hougang United
2017 season
- Chairman: Bill Ng
- Head coach: Philippe Aw
- Stadium: Hougang Stadium
- S.League: Ongoing
- Singapore Cup: Semi-finals
- League Cup: Group Stage

The 2017 season was Hougang United's 20th consecutive season in the top flight of Singapore football and in the S.League. Along with the S.League, the club will also compete in the Prime League, the Singapore Cup and the Singapore League Cup.

== Squad ==
As of 6 January 2017.

=== Sleague ===
No.	Name	Nationality	Date of birth (age)	Previous club
Goalkeepers
1	Zulfairuuz Rudy	(Singapore)	22 May 1994 (age 32)	(Singapore) Home United
13	Ridhuan Barudin	(Singapore)	23 March 1987 (age 39)	(Singapore) Tampines Rovers
18	Khairulhin Khalid	(Singapore)	18 July 1991 (age 35)	(Singapore) LionsXII
Defenders
3	Ali Hudzafi	(Singapore)	23 March 1992 (age 34)	(Singapore) Young Lions
4	Delwinder Singh	(Singapore)	5 August 1992 (age 34)	(Singapore) Young Lions
5	Atsushi Shirota	(Japan)	6 November 1991 (age 35)	(Singapore) Albirex Niigata (S)
17	Faiz Salleh	(Singapore)	17 July 1992 (age 34)	(Singapore) Young Lions
21	Lionel Tan	(Singapore)	5 June 1997 (age 29)	(Singapore) Home United
25	Wahyudi Wahid	(Singapore)	29 October 1989 (age 37)	(Singapore) LionsXII
Midfielders
2	Fairoz Hasan	(Singapore)	26 November 1988 (age 37)	(Singapore) Gombak United
8	Azhar Sairudin	(Singapore)	30 December 1986 (age 39)	(Singapore) Home United
10	Fumiya Kogure	(Japan)	28 June 1989 (age 37)	(Singapore) Albirex Niigata (S)
11	Nazrul Nazari	(Singapore)	11 February 1991 (age 35)	(Singapore) LionsXII
12	Fabian Kwok	(Singapore)	17 March 1989 (age 37)	(Singapore) Tampines Rovers
16	Syahiran Miswan	(Singapore)	22 January 1994 (age 32)	(Singapore) Home United
19	Nurhilmi Jasni	(Singapore)	17 December 1986 (age 39)	(Singapore) Balestier Khalsa
20	Afiq Noor	(Singapore)	25 December 1993 (age 32)	(Singapore) Young Lions
23	Zulfahmi Arifin	(Singapore)	5 October 1991 (age 35)	(Singapore) Home United
Forwards
7	Fareez Farhan	(Singapore)	29 July 1994 (age 32)	(Singapore) Young Lions
9	Pablo Rodriguez	(Spain)	20 July 1985 (age 41)	(Indonesia) Madura United
14	Iqbal Hussain	(Singapore)	6 June 1993 (age 33)	(Singapore) Young Lions
24	Amir Zalani	(Singapore)	4 December 1996 (age 29)	(Singapore) Home United

=== Prime league ===
No.	Name	Nationality	Date of birth (age)	Previous club
Goalkeepers
32	Ahmad Fadly	(Singapore)	22 May 1994 (age 32)	(Singapore) Tampines Rovers
42	Heng How Meng	(Singapore)		(Singapore) Home United Prime League
Defender
27	Daniel Goh	(Singapore)		(Singapore) Home United Prime League
28	Nasrul Taib	(Singapore)	10 October 1997 (age 29)	(Singapore) Home United Prime League
34	Ariyan Shamsuddin	(Singapore)	28 August 1997 (age 29)	(Singapore) Tampines Rovers Prime League
39	Amer Hakeem	(Singapore)	8 November 1998 (age 28)	(Singapore) NFA U18
40	Shahrul Affandy	(Singapore)	24 February 1998 (age 28)	(Singapore) NFA U18
41	Shaqi Sulaiman	(Singapore)	10 November 1998 (age 28)	(Singapore) Home United Prime League
43	Kishon Philip	(Singapore)	26 November 1999 (age 26)	(Singapore) NFA U18
46	Asraf Zahid	(Singapore)	8 October 1999 (age 27)	
47	Gerald Joseph Ting	(Singapore)	3 March 1999 (age 27)	
Midfielder
29	Benedict Sim Yu Hao	(Singapore)		(Singapore) Home United Prime League
30	Prakash Raj	(Singapore)		(Singapore) NFA U18
31	Aarish Kumar	(Singapore)		
33	Justin Hui	(Singapore)	17 February 1998 (age 28)	(Singapore) NFA U18
35	Royston Tan	(Singapore)	22 February 1998 (age 28)	(Singapore) NFA U18
36	Gareth Low Jun Kit	(Singapore)	28 February 1997 (age 29)	(Singapore) Young Lions
38	Darren Yap	(Singapore)	3 July 1998 (age 28)	(Singapore) NFA U17
44	Karthik Raj	(Singapore)	1 August 1997 (age 29)	(Singapore) Home United Prime League
Forward
26	Antonie Viterale	(Italy)	1 July 1996 (age 30)	(Italy) Hellas Verona
27	Daniel Goh Ji Xiong	(Singapore)	13 August 1999 (age 27)	
37	Syukri Bashir	(Singapore)	11 April 1998 (age 28)	(Singapore) NFA U18
45	Nurhalis Azmi	(Singapore)	14 March 1997 (age 29)	(Singapore) Home United Prime League

== Transfers ==
=== Pre-season transfers ===
==== In ====
Position	Player	Transferred From	Ref
GK	(Singapore) Zulfairuuz Rudy	(Singapore) Home United	
DF	(Japan) Atsushi Shirota	(Singapore) Albirex Niigata	
DF	(Singapore) Lionel Tan	(Singapore) Home United Prime League	
DF	(Singapore) Ariyan Shamsuddin	(Singapore) NFA U17	To play for Prime League
MF	(Singapore) Fabian Kwok	(Singapore) Tampines Rovers	
MF	(Singapore) Azhar Sairudin	(Singapore) Home United	
MF	(Singapore) Zulfahmi Arifin	(Singapore) Home United	
MF	(Singapore) Syahiran Miswan	(Singapore) Home United	
MF	(Singapore) Gareth Low Jun Kit	(Singapore) Young Lions	To play for Prime League
FW	(Singapore) Fareez Farhan	(Singapore) Young Lions	
FW	(Italy) Antonie Viterale	(Italy) Hellas Verona Primavera	
FW	(Singapore) Amir Zalani	(Singapore) Home United Prime League	
FW	(Spain) Pablo Rodriguez	(Indonesia) Madura United	

==== Out ====
Position	Player	Transferred To	Ref
GK	(Singapore) Fawwaz Anuar	(Singapore) Yishun Sentek Mariners FC(NFL Club)	
DF	(Singapore) Yusiskandar Yusop	Released	
DF	(Singapore) Khairulnizam Jumahat	(Singapore) South Avenue SC	
DF	(Singapore) Faliq Sudir	(Singapore) Yishun Sentek Mariners FC(NFL Club)	
MF	(Singapore) Nur Na'im Ishak	(Singapore) Yishun Sentek Mariners FC(NFL Club)	
MF	(Singapore) Nur Ridho Jafri	(Singapore) Yishun Sentek Mariners FC(NFL Club)	
MF	(Singapore) Raihan Rahman	(Singapore) Balestier Khalsa	
MF	(Singapore) Huzaifa Aziz	(Singapore) Balestier Khalsa	
FW	(Slovakia) Jozef Kapláň	(Slovakia) FK Poprad	
FW	(Croatia) Stipe Plazibat	(Singapore) Home United	
FW	(Singapore) Samuel Benjamin	(Singapore) Yishun Sentek Mariners FC(NFL Club)	

=== Trial ===
Position	Player	From	Ref

=== Mid-season transfers ===
==== Out ====
Position	Player	Transferred To	Ref
MF	(Singapore) Anumanthan Kumar	(Singapore) Home United	National Service

== Friendlies ==
=== Pre-season friendlies ===
Win Draw Loss

7 January 2017 Friendly	Hougang United (Singapore)	3–0	Singapore Cricket Club Cosmo	Dempsey Field
	Fumiya Kogure; Afiq Mat Noor; Iqbal Hussain

12 January 2017 Friendly	Hougang United (Singapore)	1–3	(Malaysia) Pahang FC	Hougang Stadium
5pm	Pablo Rodríguez 73'	Report	Mohamadou Sumareh 16'; Julius Oiboh 23'; Kiko Insa 46'

18 January 2017 Friendly	Air Force Central (Thailand)	1–0	(Singapore) Hougang United	Ratchakram Golf Club
	Kayne Vincent 43'

21 January 2017 Friendly	Pattaya United (Thailand)	2–1	(Singapore) Hougang United	Ratchakram Golf Club
			Fumiya Kogure 65'

23 January 2017 Friendly	Army United (Thailand)	3–2	(Singapore) Hougang United	Ratchakram Golf Club
			Fareez Farhan 16'; Pablo Rodriguez 80'-P

10 February 2017 Friendly	SAFSA (Singapore)	0–2	(Singapore) Hougang United	Hougang Stadium
			Pablo Rodríguez 43', 74'

18 February 2017 Friendly	Albirex Niigata (S) (Singapore)	2–0	(Singapore) Hougang United	Hougang Stadium
	Hiroyoshi Kamata 43'; Shuto Inaba 58'	Report

=== In-season friendlies ===
July 2017 Friendly	Hougang United (Singapore)	4–1	(Singapore) Tiong Bahru FC

30 August 2017 Friendly	Hougang United (Singapore)	1–1	(Malaysia) Johor Darul Ta'zim	Hougang Stadium
	Iqbal Hussain 84'		S.Chanturu 59'

== Coaching staff ==
Position	Name	Ref.
Head coach	(Singapore) Philippe Aw	
Assistant coach	(Singapore) Clement Teo	
Prime League Coach	(Singapore) Robin Chitrakar	
Fitness coach	(Germany) Dirk Schauenberg	
Goalkeeping coach	(Singapore) Lim Queen Cher	
Team manager	(Singapore) Clement Teo	
Sports trainer	(Singapore) Thomas Pang	
Kitman		

== Team statistics ==
=== Appearances and goals ===
No.	Pos.	Player	Sleague		Singapore Cup		League Cup		Total	
No.	Pos.	Player	Apps.	Goals	Apps.	Goals	Apps.	Goals	Apps.	Goals
1	GK	(Singapore) Zulfairuuz Rudy	0	0	0	0	0	0	0	0
2	DF	(Singapore) Fairoz Hasan	6(4)	1	1(2)	1	1(2)	1	8(8)	3
3	DF	(Singapore) Ali Hudzafi	11(2)	0	2	0	3	0	16(2)	0
4	DF	(Singapore) Delwinder Singh	13(1)	0	6	1	1	0	20(1)	0
5	DF	(Japan) Atsushi Shirota	23	0	6	0	3	0	32	0
7	FW	(Singapore) Fareez Farhan	7(5)	4	3(3)	1	1(1)	1	11(9)	6
8	MF	(Singapore) Azhar Sairudin	14(2)	2	1(1)	0	2	0	17(3)	2
9	FW	(Spain) Pablo Rodriguez	8(4)	2	3(1)	4	2	1	13(5)	7
10	MF	(Japan) Fumiya Kogure	17(2)	7	5	2	2(1)	0	24(3)	9
11	MF	(Singapore) Nazrul Nazari	18(2)	3	5	0	3	0	26(2)	3
12	MF	(Singapore) Fabian Kwok	16(3)	0	5	1	3	0	24(3)	1
13	GK	(Singapore) Ridhuan Barudin	7	0	1	0	3	0	11	0
14	FW	(Singapore) Iqbal Hussain	6(7)	3	2(1)	0	0(2)	0	8(10)	3
16	MF	(Singapore) Syahiran Miswan	14(3)	0	5	1	2	0	21(3)	1
17	DF	(Singapore) Faiz Salleh	12(4)	0	3(2)	0	1(1)	0	16(7)	0
18	GK	(Singapore) Khairulhin Khalid	17(1)	0	5	0	0	0	22(1)	0
19	MF	(Singapore) Nurhilmi Jasni (captain)	10(3)	2	2(1)	0	0	0	12(4)	2
20	MF	(Singapore) Afiq Noor	6(4)	0	1(2)	0	1(1)	0	8(7)	0
21	DF	(Singapore) Lionel Tan	12(1)	0	1(1)	0	0	0	13(2)	0
23	MF	(Singapore) Zulfahmi Arifin	19(1)	0	5	0	2	0	26(1)	0
24	FW	(Singapore) Amir Zalani	3(5)	0	0	0	0	0	3(5)	0
25	DF	(Singapore) Wahyudi Wahid	4(1)	0	2(1)	0	0	0	6(2)	0
26	FW	(Italy) Antoine Viterale	9(4)	0	0(2)	1	0	0	10(6)	1
33	MF	(Singapore) Justin Hui	1(4)	1	1	0	0(1)	0	2(5)	1
34	DF	(Singapore) Ariyan Shamsuddin	1(2)	0	0	0	0	0	1(2)	0
36	MF	(Singapore) Gareth Low Jun Kit	2(3)	0	0	0	0	0	2(3)	0
37	FW	(Singapore) Syukri Bashir	1(1)	0	0	0	0	0	1(1)	0
47	DF	(Singapore) Gerald Ting	1	0	0	0	2	0	3	0
Players who have played this season but had left the club or on loan to other club
6	MF	(Singapore) Anumanthan Kumar	4(1)	0	0	0	0	0	4(1)	0

== Competitions ==
=== Overview ===
Competition	Record							
Competition	P	W	D	L	GF	GA	GD	Win %
S.League	24	9	3	12	24	31	−7	37.50
Singapore Cup	5	3	1	1	12	5	+7	60.00
League Cup	3	0	3	0	3	3	+0	0.00
Total	32	12	7	13	39	39	+0	37.50

=== S.League ===
Win Draw Loss

27 February 2017 Round 1	Hougang United (Singapore)	2–0	(Singapore) Geylang International	Hougang Stadium
	Fumiya Kogure 24'; Iqbal Hussain 87'; Anumanthan Kumar (yellow card) 46'; Syahiran Miswan (yellow card) 82'		Al-Qaasimy Rahman (yellow card) 80'	Attendance: 1,652; Referee: W Ravisanthiran

3 March 2017 Round 2	Tampines Rovers (Singapore)	2–1	(Singapore) Hougang United	Jalan Besar Stadium
	Ivan Džoni (penalty scored) 29'; Khairul Amri 61'; Irwan Shah (yellow card) 84'		Fumiya Kogure (penalty scored) 90'; Zulfahmi Arifin (yellow card) 7'; Syahiran Miswan (yellow card) 33'	Attendance: 1,585; Referee: Muhd Taqi

11 March 2017 Round 3	Hougang United (Singapore)	2–0	(Singapore) Young Lions	Hougang Stadium
	Fareez Farhan 45'; Fumiya Kogure 63'; Zulfahmi Arifin (yellow card) 56'; Nazrul Nazari (yellow card) 65'		Ammirul Emmran (yellow card) 62'	Attendance: 1,354; Referee: G Letchman

2 April 2017 Round 4	Brunei DPMM	2–0	(Singapore) Hougang United	Hassanal Bolkiah National Stadium
	Billy Mehmet 9' (yellow card) 70'; Hendra Azam 45'; Željko Savić (yellow card) 59'; Azwan Saleh (yellow card) 62'		Ali Hudzaifi (yellow card) 23'; Azhar Sairudin (yellow card) 30'; Pablo Rodríguez (yellow card) 59'; Afiq Noor (yellow card) 68'	Referee: Nathan Chan

9 April 2017 Round 5	Hougang United (Singapore)	0–2	(Singapore) Home United	Hougang Stadium
	Lionel Tan (yellow card) 17'; Nazrul Nazari (yellow card) 28'; Ali Hudzaifi (yellow card) 75'		Irfan Fandi 60'; Stipe Plazibat 72'; Aqhari Abdullah (yellow card) 87'	Attendance: 1,570; Referee: Farhad Mohd

14 April 2017 Round 6	Albirex Niigata (S) (Singapore)	2–0	(Singapore) Hougang United	Jalan Besar Stadium
	Tsubasa Sano 56', 89'; Naofumi Tanaka (yellow card) 31'		Nazrul Nazari (yellow card) 63'; Fabian Kwok (yellow card) 73'	Attendance: 2,011; Referee: Sukhbir Singh

27 April 2017 Round 7	Hougang United (Singapore)	1–0	(Singapore) Balestier Khalsa	Hougang Stadium
	Nurhilmi Jasni 39'; Ali Hudzaifi (yellow card) 90'; Lionel Tan (yellow card) 90'		Raihan Rahman (yellow card) 17'; Ahmad Syahir (yellow card) 71'	Attendance: 853; Referee: W Ravisanthiran

11 May 2017 Round 8	Warriors FC (Singapore)	0–2	(Singapore) Hougang United	Choa Chu Kang Stadium
	Jordan Webb (yellow card) 13'; Firdaus Kasman (yellow card) 20'; Syaqir Sulaiman (yellow card) 21'; Hafiz Osman (yellow card) 34' (yellow card) 88' (yellow-red card); Zulfadli Zainal Abidin (yellow card) 57'		Fumiya Kogure 53'; Fareez Farhan 90'; Nazrul Nazari (yellow card) 1'; Azhar Sairudin (yellow card) 13'	Attendance: 1,438; Referee: Farhad Mohamed

20 May 2017 Round 9	Geylang International (Singapore)	1–1	(Singapore) Hougang United	Jalan Besar Stadium
	Víctor Coto Ortega (penalty missed) 55; Ricardo Sendra 65'; Safirul Sulaiman (yellow card) 30'		Azhar Sairudin 5'; Khairulhin Khalid (yellow card) 34'; Ali Hudzaifi (yellow card) 45'; Delwinder Singh (yellow card) 53' (yellow card) 55' (yellow-red card); Afiq Noor (yellow card) 72'; Fabian Kwok (yellow card) 78'	Attendance: 1,300; Referee: Jansen Foo

25 May 2017 Round 10	Hougang United (Singapore)	0–3	(Singapore) Tampines Rovers	Hougang Stadium
	Syukri Bashir (yellow card) 79'		Khairul Amri 58' (yellow card) 36'; Madhu Mohana 85'; Jamil Ali 90'	Attendance: 832; Referee: Sukhbir Singh

23 September 2017 Round 11 (Rescheduled)	Hougang United (Singapore)	1–2	Brunei DPMM	Hougang Stadium
	Azhar Sairudin 85'; Gareth Low (yellow card) 29'; Lionel Tan (yellow card) 90'		Adi Said 29'; Daúd Gazale 77'; Vincent Reyes (yellow card) 61'	Referee: Sukhbir Singh

30 June 2017 Round 12	Home United (Singapore)	2–3	(Singapore) Hougang United	Jalan Besar Stadium
	Stipe Plazibat 35'; Khairul Nizam 49'; Hariss Harun (yellow card) 37'; Irfan Fandi (yellow card) 64'		Nazrul Nazari 33' 40' (yellow card) 84'; Fareez Farhan 83'; Lionel Tan (yellow card) 65'	Referee: G Letchman

3 July 2017 Round 13	Hougang United (Singapore)	2–1	(Singapore) Albirex Niigata (S)	Hougang Stadium
	Pablo Rodriguez 26'; Fairoz Hasan 47'		Ryota Nakai 10' (pen.)	Attendance: 980; Referee: Muhd Syahir

29 July 2017 Round 14	Balestier Khalsa (Singapore)	0–0	(Singapore) Hougang United	Toa Payoh Stadium
	Raihan Rahman (yellow card) 90'		Syahiran Miswan (yellow card) 36'; Delwinder Singh (yellow card) 90'; Pablo Rodríguez (yellow card) 90'; Nazrul Nazari (red card) 53'	Attendance: 966; Referee: Jansen Foo

4 August 2017 Round 15	Hougang United (Singapore)	0–1	(Singapore) Warriors FC	Jalan Besar Stadium
			Shahril Ishak 6'; Hafiz Osman (yellow card) 58'; Andrei Ciolacu (yellow card) 61'	Attendance: 1,259; Referee: G Letchman

18 August 2017 Round 16	Hougang United (Singapore)	0–1	(Singapore) Geylang International	Hougang Stadium
			Shawal Anuar 28'	Attendance: 741; Referee: Muhd Taqi

9 September 2017 Round 17	Tampines Rovers (Singapore)	5–1	(Singapore) Hougang United	Our Tampines Hub
	Shahdan Sulaiman 12' (pen.) 54' (pen.); Irwan Shah 45'; Ryutaro Megumi 65'; Fazli Ayob 90'; Ismadi Mukhtar (yellow card) 79'		Fareez Farhan 4'; Lionel Tan (yellow card) 11'; Faiz Salleh (yellow card) 66'	Attendance: 1,521; Referee: Sukhbir Singh

15 September 2017 Round 18	Hougang United (Singapore)	2–1	(Singapore) Young Lions FC	Hougang Stadium
	Pablo Rodríguez 1'; Nurhilmi Jasni 17' (yellow card) 44'; Delwinder Singh (yellow card) 26'; Syahiran Miswan (yellow card) 36' (yellow card) 73' (yellow-red card)		Rusyaidi Salime (yellow card) 37'	Attendance: 650; Referee: Ahmad A'Qashah

19 September 2017 Round 19	Brunei DPMM	1–4	(Singapore) Hougang United	Hassanal Bolkiah National Stadium
	Rafael Ramazotti 74'; Azwan Ali (yellow card) 34'; Nurikhwan Othman (yellow card) 38'		Fumiya Kogure 8' (pen.) 27' (pen.) 84'; Iqbal Hussain 76'; Lionel Tan (yellow card) 5'; Antoine Viterale (red card) 80'	Attendance: 778; Referee: Farhad Mohamed

15 October 2017 Round 20 (Rescheduled)	Hougang United (Singapore)	0–2	(Singapore) Home United	Hougang Stadium
	Fabian Kwok (yellow card) 88'		Abdil Qaiyyim 55'; Stipe Plazibat 69'; Anumanthan Kumar (yellow card) 46'; Izzdin Shafiq (yellow card) 89'	Attendance: 901; Referee: G Letchman

19 October 2017 Round 21	Albirex Niigata (S) (Singapore)	1–0	(Singapore) Hougang United	Jurong East Stadium
	Ryota Nakai 81'		Nurhilmi Jasni (yellow card) 90'	Referee: W Ravisanthiran

24 October 2017 Round 22	Young Lions FC (Singapore)	0–1	(Singapore) Hougang United	Jalan Besar Stadium
	Amirul Adli (yellow card) 28'		Justin Hui 60'; Faiz Salleh (yellow card) 41'	Referee: Sukhbir Singh

2 November 2017 Round 23	Hougang United (Singapore)	0–1	(Singapore) Balestier Khalsa	Hougang Stadium
	Syahiran Miswan (yellow card) 38'; Iqbal Hamid Hussain (yellow card) 45'		Hazzuwan Halim 59' (pen.); Raihan Rahman (yellow card) 87'	Referee: W Ravisanthiran

17 November 2017 Round 24	Warriors FC (Singapore)	1–1	(Singapore) Hougang United	Choa Chu Kang Stadium
	Hafiz Nor 39'		Iqbal Hussain 17'

Pos	Team	Pld	W	D	L	GF	GA	GD	Pts
4	Geylang International	24	11	3	10	32	37	−5	36
5	Warriors FC	24	9	7	8	33	36	−3	34
6	Hougang United	24	9	3	12	24	31	−7	30
7	Balestier Khalsa	24	5	4	15	17	33	−16	19
8	(Brunei) DPMM FC (Note: The two foreign clubs – Albirex Niigata (S) and DPMM FC – as well as the Football Association of Singapore (FAS) under-21 team, Young Lions, are not eligible for any AFC competition spots.)	24	5	2	17	30	61	−31	17

Source: S.League
Rules for classification: 1) points; 2) goal difference; 3) number of goals scored; 4) number of wins

=== Singapore Cup ===
Win Draw Loss

==== Preliminary round ====
20 June 2017 Preliminary round	Hougang United (Singapore)	1–0	(Philippines) Ceres–Negros	Hougang Stadium
	Antoine Viterale 77'; Fabian Kwok (yellow card) 14'; Ali Hudzafi (yellow card) 42'; Khairulhin Khalid (yellow card) 90+3'; Nazrul Nazari (yellow card) 90+4'		Kevin Ingreso (yellow card) 14'; Fernando Rodríguez (yellow card) 53'; Martin Steuble (yellow card) 90+4'	Referee: Sukhbir Singh

==== Quarter-final ====
11 August 2017 Quarter-final Leg 1	Hougang United (Singapore)	4–1	(Cambodia) Nagaworld FC	Hougang Stadium
	Fumiya Kogure 15', 40'; Pablo Rodríguez 72' (yellow card) 59'; Fairoz Hasan 85'; Atsushi Shirota (yellow card) 81'		Atuhei Kipson 59' (pen.); Nhim Sovannara (yellow card) 68'	Referee: W Ravisanthiran

14 August 2017 Quarter-final Leg 2	Nagaworld FC (Cambodia)	0–4	(Singapore) Hougang United	Jalan Besar Stadium
			Pablo Rodríguez 44', 69' (yellow card) 59'; Fareez Farhan 66'; Syahiran Miswan 78'	Referee: Ahmad A'Qashah

Hougang United won 8–1 on aggregate

==== Semi-final ====
27 September 2017 Semi-final Leg 1	Global Cebu F.C. (Philippines)	2–2	(Singapore) Hougang United	Jalan Besar Stadium
	Darryl Roberts 33', 68'; Hikaru Minegishi (yellow card) 57'; Dennis Villanueva (yellow card) 59'; Paul Mulders (yellow card) 90'		Delwinder Singh 28'; Fabian Kwok 85'; Fareez Farhan (yellow card) 53'	Referee: Nathan Chan

30 September 2017 Semi-final Leg 2	Hougang United (Singapore)	1–2	(Philippines) Global Cebu F.C.	Hougang Stadium
	Pablo Rodríguez 39'		Darryl Roberts 13', 72'	Referee: G Letchman

Hougang United lost 4–3 on aggregate

==== 3rd/4th place ====
25 November 2017 3rd/4th place	Home United (Singapore)	1–0	(Singapore) Hougang United	Jalan Besar Stadium
	Amiruldin Asraf 21'			Referee: Farhad Mohd

=== Singapore TNP League Cup ===
Pos	Team	Pld	W	D	L	GF	GA	GD	Pts	Qualification
1	Albirex Niigata (S)	3	2	1	0	0	0	0	7	Advance to semi-final
2	Warriors	3	1	1	1	6	7	−1	4	Advance to semi-final
3	Hougang United	3	0	3	0	3	3	0	3	
4	Home United	3	0	1	2	4	6	−2	1	

Source: S.League

==== Group matches ====
Win Draw Loss

7 July 2017 Group Stage M1	Hougang United (Singapore)	0–0	(Singapore) Albirex Niigata (S)	Hougang Stadium
				Referee: W Ravisanthiran

10 July 2017 Group Stage M2	Home United (Singapore)	1–1	(Singapore) Hougang United	Jalan Besar Stadium
	Stipe Plazibat 39'; Abdil Qaiyyim (yellow card) 25'; Afiq Yunos (yellow card) 90' (yellow card) 90' (yellow-red card); Khairul Nizam (red card) 90'		Fairoz Hasan 36'; Afiq Noor (yellow card) 53'; Justin Hui (yellow card) 70'; Delwinder Singh (yellow card) 90'	Referee: Farhad Mohd

13 July 2017 Group Stage M3	Hougang United (Singapore)	2–2	(Singapore) Warriors FC	Hougang Stadium
	Fareez Farhan 35'; Pablo Rodríguez 57'; Fabien Kwok (yellow card) 62'		Shahril Ishak 6'; Ho Wai Loon 41'	Referee: Muhd Syahir
