= 2016 Hougang United FC season =

Hougang United
2016 season
- Chairman: Bill Ng
- Head coach: K. Balagumaran
- Stadium: Hougang Stadium

The 2016 season was Hougang United's 19th consecutive season in the top flight of Singapore football and in the S.League. Along with the S.League, the club will also compete in the Prime League, the Singapore Cup and the Singapore League Cup.

== Squad ==
As of 6 January 2017.

=== Sleague ===
No.	Name	Nationality	Date of birth (age)	Previous club
Goalkeepers
1	Ridhuan Barudin	(Singapore)	23 March 1987 (age 39)	(Singapore) Tampines Rovers
13	Fawwaz Anuar	(Singapore)	6 January 1994 (age 32)	(Singapore) Tampines Rovers Prime League
18	Khairulhin Khalid	(Singapore)	18 July 1991 (age 35)	(Singapore) LionsXII
Defenders
2	Yusiskandar Yusop	(Singapore)	15 July 1985 (age 41)	(Singapore) Balestier Khalsa
3	Ali Hudzafi	(Singapore)	23 March 1992 (age 34)	(Singapore) Young Lions
4	Delwinder Singh	(Singapore)	5 August 1992 (age 34)	(Singapore) Young Lions
11	Nazrul Nazari	(Singapore)	11 February 1991 (age 35)	(Singapore) LionsXII
17	Faiz Salleh	(Singapore)	17 July 1992 (age 34)	(Singapore) Young Lions
21	Khairulnizam Jumahat	(Singapore)	8 December 1990 (age 35)	(Singapore) Geylang International
22	Wahyudi Wahid	(Singapore)	29 October 1989 (age 37)	(Singapore) LionsXII
Midfielders
6	Anumanthan Kumar	(Singapore)	14 July 1994 (age 32)	(Singapore) Young Lions FC
8	Fumiya Kogure	(Japan)	28 June 1989 (age 37)	(Singapore) Albirex Niigata (S)
10	Nur Naiim Ishak	(Singapore)	24 December 1993 (age 32)	(Singapore) Young Lions FC
12	Nur Ridho	(Singapore)	18 August 1994 (age 32)	(Singapore) Young Lions FC
15	Huzaifah Aziz	(Singapore)	27 June 1994 (age 32)	(Singapore) Geylang International
16	Raihan Rahman	(Singapore)	7 February 1991 (age 35)	(Singapore) LionsXII
19	Nurhilmi Jasni	(Singapore)	17 December 1986 (age 39)	(Singapore) Balestier Khalsa
20	Afiq Noor	(Singapore)	25 December 1993 (age 32)	(Singapore) Young Lions
Forwards
5	Fairoz Hasan	(Singapore)	26 November 1988 (age 37)	(Singapore) Gombak United
7	Jozef Kapláň	(Slovakia)	2 April 1986 (age 40)	(Singapore) Geylang International
9	Stipe Plazibat	(Croatia)	31 August 1989 (age 37)	(Croatia) NK Dugopolje
14	Iqbal Hussain	(Singapore)	6 June 1993 (age 33)	(Singapore) Young Lions
23	Samuel Benjamin	(Singapore)	31 October 1994 (age 32)	(Singapore) LionsXII

== Transfers ==
=== Pre-season transfers ===
==== In ====
Position	Player	Transferred From	Ref
GK	(Singapore) Khairulhin Khalid	(Singapore) LionsXII	
DF	(Singapore) Ali Hudzafi	(Singapore) Young Lions FC	
DF	(Singapore) Nazrul Nazari	(Singapore) LionsXII	
DF	(Singapore) Wahyudi Wahid	(Singapore) LionsXII	
DF	(Singapore) Yusiskandar Yusop	(Singapore) Balestier Khalsa	
MF	(Singapore) Afiq Noor	(Singapore) Young Lions FC	
MF	(Singapore) Anumanthan Kumar	(Singapore) Young Lions FC	
MF	(Singapore) Nur Naiim Ishak	(Singapore) Young Lions FC	
MF	(Japan) Fumiya Kogure	(Singapore) Albirex Niigata (S)	
MF	(Singapore) Huzaifah Aziz	(Singapore) Geylang International	
MF	(Singapore) Raihan Rahman	(Singapore) LionsXII	
FW	(Slovenia) Jozef Kapláň	(Singapore) Geylang International	
FW	(Croatia) Stipe Plazibat	(Croatia) NK Dugopolje	
FW	(Singapore) Iqbal Hussain	(Singapore) Young Lions FC	
FW	(Singapore) Samuel Benjamin	(Singapore) LionsXII	

==== Out ====
Position	Player	Transferred To	Ref
GK	(Singapore) Ahmadulhaq Che Omar	(Singapore) Admiralty FC(NFL Club)	
DF	(Japan) Kunihiro Yamashita	(Myanmar) Yangon United	
DF	(Japan) Yuki Uchiyama	(Japan) Hokkaido Consadole Sapporo	Loan Return
DF	(Singapore) Lau Meng Meng	(Singapore) Eunos Crescent FC	
DF	(Singapore) Faizal Amir	Released	
DF	(Singapore) Matthew Abraham	Released	
DF	(Singapore) Kenneth Chang	(Singapore) Tiong Bahru FC(NFL Club)	
MF	(Japan) Atsushi Shimono	(Philippines) JPV Marikina F.C.	
MF	(Argentina) Carlos Alberto Delgado	(Singapore) Geylang International	
MF	(Singapore) (Malaysia) Ruzaini Zainal	Retired	
MF	(Singapore) Firman Hanif	(Singapore) Yishun Sentek Mariners FC(NFL Club)	
MF	(Singapore) Taufiq Ghani	(Singapore) Geylang International	
FW	(Brazil) Diego Gama de Oliveira	(Indonesia) Pusamania Borneo F.C.	
FW	(Serbia) Vuk Sotirović	(Serbia) FK Borac Čačak	
FW	(Singapore) Muhaymin Salim	Released	
FW	(Singapore) Fareez Farhan	(Singapore) Young Lions	Season loan

=== Trial ===
Position	Player	From	Ref

=== Mid-season transfers ===
==== Out ====
Position	Player	Transferred To	Ref
MF	(Singapore) Anumanthan Kumar	(Singapore) Home United	National Service

== Coaching staff ==
Position	Name	Ref.
Head coach	(Singapore) Philippe Aw	
Assistant coach	(Singapore) Clement Teo	
Prime League Coach	(Singapore) Robin Chitrakar	
Fitness coach	(Germany) Dirk Schauenberg	
Goalkeeping coach	(Singapore) Lim Queen Cher	
Team manager	(Singapore) Clement Teo	
Sports trainer	(Singapore) Thomas Pang	
Kitman		

== Statistics ==
=== Appearances and goals ===
No.	Pos.	Player	Sleague		Singapore Cup		League Cup		Total	
No.	Pos.	Player	Apps.	Goals	Apps.	Goals	Apps.	Goals	Apps.	Goals
1	GK	(Singapore) Ridhuan Barudin	3	0	0	0	5	0	8	0
2	DF	(Singapore) Yusiskandar Yusop	12	0	0	0	5	0	17	0
3	DF	(Singapore) Ali Hudzafi	4	0	0	0	0	0	4	0
4	DF	(Singapore) Delwinder Singh	13	0	1	0	3	0	17	0
5	FW	(Singapore) Fairoz Hasan	19	0	1	0	3	0	23	0
6	MF	(Singapore) Anumanthan Kumar	22	0	1	0	0	0	23	0
7	FW	(Slovakia) Jozef Kapláň	24	3	1	0	5	5	30	8
8	MF	(Japan) Fumiya Kogure	21	4	1	1	5	3	27	8
9	FW	(Croatia) Stipe Plazibat	24	15	1	0	3	1	28	16
10	MF	(Singapore) Nur Na'iim	13	0	0	0	4	0	17	0
11	DF	(Singapore) Nazrul Nazari	23	0	1	0	0	0	24	0
12	MF	(Singapore) Nur Ridho	10	0	0	0	1	0	11	0
13	GK	(Singapore) Fawwaz Anuar	0	0	0	0	0	0	0	0
14	FW	(Singapore) Iqbal Hussain	18	4	1	0	5	2	24	6
15	MF	(Singapore) Huzaifah Aziz	16	0	0	0	3	0	19	0
16	MF	(Singapore) Raihan Rahman	21	2	1	0	4	0	26	2
17	DF	(Singapore) Faiz Salleh	17	1	1	0	0	0	18	1
18	GK	(Singapore) Khairulhin Khalid	21	0	1	0	0	0	22	0
19	MF	(Singapore) Nurhilmi Jasni	19	3	0	0	4	0	23	3
20	MF	(Singapore) Afiq Noor	15	0	0	0	4	0	19	0
21	DF	(Singapore) Khairulnizam Jumahat	1	0	1	0	4	0	6	0
22	DF	(Singapore) Wahyudi Wahid	10	0	1	0	4	0	15	0
23	DF	(Singapore) Samuel Benjamin	4	0	0	0	2	0	6	0
24	DF	(Singapore) Faliq Sudir	0	0	0	0	4	0	4	0
Players who have played this season but had left the club or on loan to other club

== Competitions ==
=== Overview ===
Competition	Record							
Competition	P	W	D	L	GF	GA	GD	Win %
S.League	24	9	5	10	35	39	−4	37.50
Singapore Cup	1	0	0	1	1	2	−1	0.00
League Cup	3	1	0	2	8	9	−1	33.33
Total	28	10	5	13	44	50	−6	35.71

=== S.League ===
Win Draw Loss

Round 1

18 February 2016 Round 1	Hougang United (Singapore)	1–0	(Singapore) Home United	Hougang, Singapore
	Stipe Plazibat 34'			Stadium: Hougang Stadium; Attendance: 2,307; Referee: Jansen Foo

26 February 2016 Round 2	Tampines Rovers (Singapore)	4–1	(Singapore) Hougang United	Jurong West, Singapore
	Shahdan Sulaiman 8'; Ismadi Mukhtar 1'; Jermain Pennant 19'; Fazrul Nawaz 84'		Stipe Plazibat 26'	Stadium: Jurong West Stadium; Attendance: 2,106; Referee: Ahmad A'Qashah

4 March 2016 Round 3	Hougang United (Singapore)	0–0	Brunei DPMM	Kallang, Singapore
				Stadium: Jalan Besar Stadium; Referee: Nathan Chan

10 March 2016 Round 4	Young Lions FC (Singapore)	1–3	(Singapore) Hougang United	Kallang, Singapore
	Fareez Farhan 79'		Stipe Plazibat 4' 82'; Taufiq Muqminin 52' (o.g.)	Stadium: Jalan Besar Stadium; Referee: Farhad Mohd

19 March 2016 Round 5	Hougang United (Singapore)	1–0	(Singapore) Balestier Khalsa	Hougang, Singapore
	Stipe Plazibat 82'			Stadium: Hougang Stadium; Referee: Ahmad A'Qashah

2 April 2016 Round 6	Albirex Niigata (S) (Singapore)	2–0	(Singapore) Hougang United	Jurong East, Singapore
	Atsushi Shirota 49'; Tatsuro Inui 86'			Stadium: Jurong East Stadium; Attendance: 2,384; Referee: Muhd Taqi

7 April 2016 Round 7	Hougang United (Singapore)	3–1	(Singapore) Geylang International	Hougang, Singapore
	Stipe Plazibat 55' (pen.); Faiz Salleh 60'; Raihan Rahman 88'		Carlos Delgado 15' (pen.)	Stadium: Hougang Stadium; Attendance: 1,537; Referee: Sukhbir Singh

14 April 2016 Round 8	Warriors FC (Singapore)	0–1	(Singapore) Hougang United	Choa Chu Kang, Singapore
			Fumiya Kogure 18'	Stadium: Choa Chu Kang Stadium; Referee: W. Ravisanthiran

Round 2

29 April 2016 Round 9	Home United (Singapore)	3–2	(Singapore) Hougang United	Kallang, Singapore
	Ilsø 16'; Song 28'; Faris 78'	Details	Plazibat 41' (pen.); Raihan 86'	Stadium: Jalan Besar Stadium; Referee: Muhd Taqi

4 May 2016 Round 10	Hougang United (Singapore)	1–1	(Singapore) Tampines Rovers	Hougang, Singapore
	Iqbal 70'	Details	Mehmet 41' (pen.)	Stadium: Hougang Stadium; Attendance: 1,538; Referee: Ahmad A'Qashah

14 May 2016 Round 11	Brunei DPMM	3–2	(Singapore) Hougang United	Bandar Seri Begawan, Brunei
	Paulo Sérgio 10'; Azwan A. 26'; Shahrazen 82'	Details	Plazibat 55'; Kapláň 59'	Stadium: Hassanal Bolkiah National Stadium; Referee: Jansen Foo

19 May 2016 Round 12	Hougang United (Singapore)	1–1	(Singapore) Garena Young Lions	Hougang, Singapore
	Nurhilmi 18'	Details	Fareez 14' (pen.)	Stadium: Hougang Stadium; Referee: Sukhbir Singh

10 June 2016 Round 13	Balestier Khalsa (Singapore)	2–2	(Singapore) Hougang United	Kallang, Singapore
	Tokić 10'; Fazli 60'	Details	Kogure 86'; Plazibat 90'	Stadium: Jalan Besar Stadium; Referee: Nathan Chan

15 June 2016 Round 14	Hougang United (Singapore)	1–2	(Singapore) Albirex Niigata (S)	Hougang, Singapore
	Kapláň 39'	Details	Kawata 57'; Inui 62'	Stadium: Hougang Stadium; Referee: Farhad Mohd

18 June 2016 Round 15	Geylang International (Singapore)	1–2	(Singapore) Hougang United	Bedok, Singapore
	Amy 90'	Details	Kapláň 63'; Plazibat 85'	Stadium: Bedok Stadium; Referee: Jansen Foo

23 June 2016 Round 16	Hougang United (Singapore)	1–3	(Singapore) Warriors	Hougang, Singapore
	Nurhilmi 40'	Details	Hafiz N. 61'; Shaiful 85'; Béhé 87'	Stadium: Hougang Stadium; Referee: G. Letchman

Round 3

12 August 2016 Round 17	Hougang United (Singapore)	4–2	(Singapore) Home United	Kallang, Singapore
	Plazibat 39' (pen.), 44' (pen.); Hussain 52'; Kogure 56'	Details	Ilsø 6'; Song 7'	Stadium: Jalan Besar Stadium; Referee: Muhd Taqi

17 August 2016 Round 18	Tampines Rovers (Singapore)	1–2	(Singapore) Hougang United	Jurong West, Singapore
	Webb 45'	Details	Plazibat 22'; Kogure 90+2'	Stadium: Jurong West Stadium; Referee: Sukhbir Singh

26 August 2016 Round 19	Hougang United (Singapore)	1–2	Brunei DPMM	Kallang, Singapore
	Plazibat 9'	Details	Ramazotti 51', 52'	Stadium: Jalan Besar Stadium; Referee: Ahmad A'Qashah

22 September 2016 Round 20	Garena Young Lions (Singapore)	0–2	(Singapore) Hougang United	Kallang, Singapore
		Details	Hussain 45'; Jasni 71'	Stadium: Jalan Besar Stadium; Referee: Jansen Foo

1 October 2016 Round 21	Hougang United (Singapore)	1–1	(Singapore) Balestier Khalsa	Hougang, Singapore
	Plazibat 8'	Details	Syafiq 70'	Stadium: Hougang Stadium; Referee: Farhad Mohd

14 October 2016 Round 22	Albirex Niigata (S) (Singapore)	3–0	(Singapore) Hougang United	Kallang, Singapore
	Kawata 4'; Jitozono 8'; Kumada 32'	Details		Stadium: Jalan Besar Stadium; Referee: Farhad Mohd

20 October 2016 Round 23	Hougang United (Singapore)	0–1	(Singapore) Geylang International	Hougang, Singapore
		Details	Suhaimi 43'	Stadium: Hougang Stadium; Referee: G. Letchman

25 October 2016 Round 24	Warriors (Singapore)	5–1	(Singapore) Hougang United	Choa Chu Kang, Singapore
	Béhé 51', 69', 90+3'; Rak 57'; Jaffar 81'	Details	Hussain 37'	Stadium: Choa Chu Kang Stadium; Referee: Nathan Chan

Pos	Team	Pld	W	D	L	GF	GA	GD	Pts	Qualification
4	Home United	24	11	4	9	50	42	+8	37	Qualification to AFC Cup Play-off Round
5	Geylang International	24	10	7	7	35	29	+6	37	
6	Hougang United	24	9	5	10	35	39	−4	32	
7	Warriors FC	24	7	7	10	39	39	0	28	
8	Balestier Khalsa	24	4	7	13	23	42	−19	19	

Updated to match(es) played on 31 October 2016. Source: S.League
Rules for classification: 1) points; 2) goal difference; 3) number of goals scored; 4) number of wins

=== Singapore Cup ===
Win Draw Loss

==== Preliminary round ====
26 May 2016	Home United (Singapore)	2–1	(Singapore) Hougang United	Bishan Stadium, Singapore
19:30 UTC+8	Azhar 48'; Ilsø 90'	Details	Kogure 58'	Referee: G. Letchman

=== Singapore TNP League Cup ===
Pos	Team	Pld	W	D	L	GF	GA	GD	Pts	Qualification
1	(Brunei) DPMM FC	3	3	0	0	8	1	+7	9	Advance to semi-final
2	Tampines Rovers	3	2	0	1	10	6	+4	6	Advance to semi-final
3	Hougang United	3	1	0	2	8	9	−1	3	
4	Warriors FC	3	0	0	3	1	11	−10	0	

Source: S.League

==== Group matches ====
Win Draw Loss

13 July 2016	Tampines Rovers (Singapore)	6–4	(Singapore) Hougang United	Jurong West Stadium, Singapore
19:30 UTC+8	Shahdan 28'; Na'iim 32' (o.g.); Webb 35'; Sufian 44' (pen.); Mehmet 75' (pen.); Saifullah 83'	Details	Kogure 56'; Kapláň 67', 87'; Plazibat 90'	Referee: Sukhbir Singh

17 July 2016	Hougang United (Singapore)	0–2	(Brunei) DPMM FC	Hougang Stadium, Singapore
19:30 UTC+8		Details	Paulo Sérgio 44' (pen.); Ramazotti 89' (pen.)	Referee: Nathan Chan

21 July 2016	Hougang United (Singapore)	4–1	(Singapore) Warriors	Hougang Stadium, Singapore
19:30 UTC+8	Iqbal Hussain 42' Fumiya Kogure 67' Jozef Kapláň 87' 90'	Details	Hafiz Rahim 71'	Referee: Farhad Mohd
