= Justin Hui =

Singaporean footballer

Personal information
- Full name: Justin Hui Yong Kang
- Date of birth: 17 February 1998 (age 28)
- Place of birth: Singapore
- Positions: Winger; central midfielder

Team information
- Current team: Hougang United

Youth career
- 2015–2016: National Football Academy

Senior career*
Years	Team	Apps	(Gls)
2016	Young Lions	1	(0)
2017–2020	Hougang United	27	(3)
2021	Lion City Sailors	2	(0)
2024	Hougang United	0	(0)

International career
2015	Singapore U19	4	(1)
- * Club domestic league appearances and goals as of 14 May 2021

Justin Hui Yong Kang (born 17 February 1998) is a Singaporean Chinese professional footballer who plays as a winger or central midfielder for Singapore Premier League club Hougang United.

== Personal life ==
Justin is the son of a private tutor and a teacher. He attended Holy Innocents' Primary School before attending the Singapore Sports School and Meridian Junior College. He was handed the captaincy of MJC's football team, guiding them to the 2017 A Division football title.

He was with the National Football Academy (Singapore) since Secondary 2 and later started his career with the National Football Academy Under-18 side in the Prime League.

His performance at the youth level led to him being nominated for the 2015 and 2016 Dollah Kassim Award although he did not win it.

== Club career ==
=== NFA U18 ===
Justin started his career with National Football Academy (NFA) u-18 team in 2015. In his second season with the team, he was handed the captaincy of the team by head coach, Takuya Inoue.

=== Young Lions ===
After impressive performances in the Prime League with the NFA U18s, he was handed a debut in the S.League for the Young Lions in September 2016, coming on as a substitute against Brunei DPMM. However, he was released from the team following the conclusion of the season.

=== Hougang United ===
Justin then moved to Hougang United for the 2017 S.League season but was initially registered for their reserve side in the Prime League. He made his debut for the Cheetahs against Tampines Rovers, coming on as a substitute in the 61st minute before earning a shock first start in the following match against Brunei DPMM in a 2–0 defeat. Hui made his first start for the club in a Singapore Cup match, in August, against Cambodian side Nagaworld FC, playing over 80 minutes. Hui then made his first S.League start for the Cheetahs in late October 2017 against his former club, Young Lions. It proved a debut to remember for Hui as he scored the winning goal in a 1–0 victory for the cheetahs. Prior to this match, Hui had made 3 substitute appearances in the league for the club.

== International career ==
He was part of the 2015 Under-18 Squad for AFC Under-19 Championship qualifiers.

== International Statistics ==
=== U19 International caps ===
No	Date	Venue	Opponent	Result	Competition
1	25 August 2015	Laos National Stadium, Vientiane, Laos	Malaysia	0-4 (lost)	2015 AFF U-19 Youth Championship
2	29 August 2015	Laos National Stadium, Vientiane, Laos	Vietnam	0-6 (lost)	2015 AFF U-19 Youth Championship
3	31 August 2015	Laos National Stadium, Vientiane, Laos	Timor-Leste	1-1 (draw)	2015 AFF U-19 Youth Championship
4	28 September 2015	SCG Stadium, Nonthaburi, Thailand	Northern Mariana Islands	10-0 (won)	2016 AFC U-19 Championship qualification

=== U19 International goals ===
No	Date	Venue	Opponent	Result	Competition
1	28 September 2015	SCG Stadium, Nonthaburi, Thailand	Northern Mariana Islands	10-0 (won)	2016 AFC U-19 Championship qualification

== Honours ==
=== Individual ===
- Straits Times' Young Star of the Month: May 2017, August 2017
- Straits Times' Young Athlete of the Year: 2018

== Career statistics ==
Updated 11 Apr 2021

Club	Season	S.League		Singapore Cup		League Cup		ACL		AFC Cup		Total	
Club	Season	Apps	Goals	Apps	Goals	Apps	Goals	Apps	Goals	Apps	Goals	Apps	Goals
Young Lions FC	2016	1	0	0	0	0	0	—				1	0
Young Lions FC	Total	1	0	0	0	0	0	0	0	0	0	1	0
Hougang United	2017	5	1	1	0	1	0	0	0	0	0	7	1
Hougang United	2018	15	1	0	0	0	0	0	0	0	0	15	1
Hougang United	2019	1	0	0	0	0	0	0	0	0	0	1	0
Hougang United	2020	9	1	0	0	0	0	0	0	0	0	9	1
Hougang United	Total	30	3	1	0	1	0	0	0	0	0	32	3
Lion City Sailors	2021	4	0	0	0	0	0	0	0	0	0	4	0
Lion City Sailors	Total	4	0	0	0	0	0	0	0	0	0	4	0
Career Total		35	3	1	0	3	0	0	0	0	0	37	3
