= Lionel Tan =

Singaporean footballer

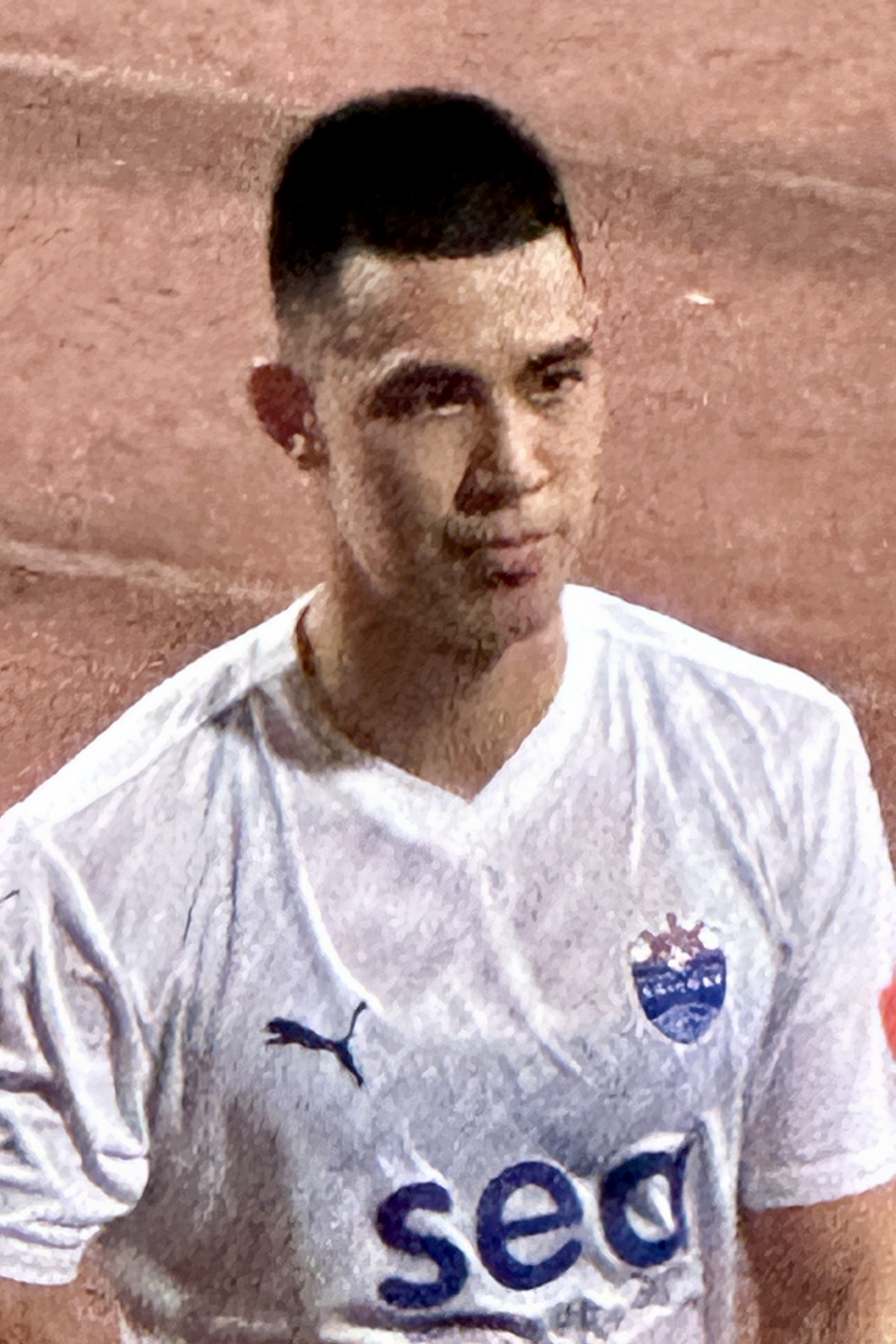
- Lionel with Lion City Sailors in 2024

Personal information
- Full name: Lionel Tan Han Wei
- Date of birth: 5 June 1997 (age 29)
- Place of birth: Singapore
- Height: 1.84 m (6 ft 0 in)
- Positions: Centre-back; right-back

Team information
- Current team: Lion City Sailors
- Number: 5

Youth career
- 2011–2014: Singapore Sports School
- 2015: National Football Academy
- 2016: Home United

Senior career*
Years	Team	Apps	(Gls)
2016	Home United	0	(0)
2017	Hougang United	13	(0)
2018	→ SAFSA (loan)	0	(0)
2019–2020	Young Lions	20	(0)
2020–2022	Hougang United	50	(3)
2023–	Lion City Sailors	63	(3)

International career^{‡}
2015	Singapore U19	12	(0)
2017–2019	Singapore U23	4	(1)
2023–	Singapore	36	(3)
Medal record
Men's football
Representing Singapore
Merlion Cup
Winner	2019 Singapore
Representing Singapore
Singapore Cup
Winner	2022 Singapore
- * Club domestic league appearances and goals as of 1 November 2026 ‡ National team caps and goals as of 1 October 2026

Lionel Tan Han Wei (陈汉玮, born 5 June 1997) is a Singaporean professional footballer who plays either as a centre-back or right-back for Singapore Premier League club Lion City Sailors and the Singapore national team.

Lionel was with the National Football Academy after graduating from Singapore Sports School. In 2016, Lionel started his career with Home United's Prime League team. Subsequently, in 2017, he moved to Hougang United. His performance at the youth level led to him being nominated for the 2014 Dollah Kassim Award although he did not win it in the end.

== Club career ==
=== Youth ===
Lionel started his career with National Football Academy (NFA) U-18 team in 2015 after his graduation from the Singapore Sports School. He had hoped to move on to the Garena Young Lions squad following his exploits with the NFA. However, when no such move arose, Tan jumped at the chance to be reunited with Robin Chitrakar at Home United's Prime League squad.

=== Home United ===
Lionel moved to Home United in 2016 and was made the vice captain of the prime league squad. During his time with the Protectors' Prime League squad, he helped them achieve a double, winning the Prime League and the Singapore FA Cup.

Lionel then made his senior debut on 14 July 2016 against Albirex Niigata (S) in the Singapore League Cup. He made a total of two senior appearances for Home United before moving on the next season.

=== Hougang United ===
Lionel then moved to Hougang United for the 2017 Singapore Premier League season. He made his debut for the Cheetahs against Tampines Rovers, coming on as a substitute in the 61st minute before earning a shock first start in the following match against Brunei DPMM in a 2–0 defeat.

==== Loan to SAFSA ====
In 2018, Lionel was loaned to SAFSA while he is serving his National Services duties.

=== Young Lions ===
After spending one year with SAFSA, Lionel moved to Garena Young Lions for the 2019 Singapore Premier League season for whom he made a total of 19 league appearances.

=== Return to Hougang United ===
Lionel returned to Hougang United after the completion of his National Service in the middle of the 2020 Singapore Premier League season. He scored the first professional goal of his career in the third match of the 2021 Singapore Premier League season, sweeping in a loose ball and helping his team to a shock 3–1 win against powerhouse Lion City Sailors.

=== Lion City Sailors ===
On 18 January 2023, Lion City Sailors announced the arrival of Lionel on a free from Hougang United. He make his debut on 24 February in a 3–1 win over Tanjong Pagar United. He scored his first goal for the club on 1 July against the same opponent in the away fixture in a thrashing 7–1 win. On 20 September, Lionel make his AFC Champions League debut in a 1–2 lost against Thailand club Bangkok United. On 9 December, he helped the club to win the 2023 Singapore Cup which is also his first back to back cup win with a different club.

On 26 February 2025, Lionel scored the only goal in the match against league rivals, Tampines Rovers which give Lion City Sailors the 9 points gap on top of the league table. Despite Maxime Lestienne's equaliser in the 91st minute of the 2025 AFC Champions League Two final against Sharjah, the Sailors finished as a runner-up after conceding in the 97th minute to finish the game in a 1–2 defeat.

== International career ==
=== Youth ===
Lionel was part of the 2015 Under-18 Squad for AFC Under-19 Championship qualifiers.

Lionel is also in the 2016 AFC Under-19 Championship qualifiers playing in matches against Thailand which the team lost 3–0. He also played against Chinese Taipei.

In 2017, Lionel was called up to the Singapore Under-22 squad for the 2017 Southeast Asian Games but failed to make a single appearance as the Republic crashed out in the group stages.

He captained the Singapore Under-22 squad for the 2019 Southeast Asian Games.

=== Senior ===
Lionel made his senior-level debut in a 1–1 draw with Hong Kong which saw him score a goal on both ends. Lionel then scored again in his second cap, a 1–0 victory over Macau. On 12 September 2023, he scored again to put Singapore in the lead against Chinese Taipei at the Bishan Stadium – his third international goal.

== Career statistics ==
=== Club ===
As of matches played on 30 May 2026

Club	Season	League			Singapore Cup		League Cup		AFC Competition		Community Shield / AFF Cup		Total	
Club	Season	Division	Apps	Goals	Apps	Goals	Apps	Goals	Apps	Goals	Apps	Goals	Apps	Goals
Home United	2016	S.League	0	0	0	0	3	0	0	0	0	0	3	0
Hougang United	2017	S.League	13	0	2	0	0	0	0	0	0	0	15	0
SAFSA (loan)	2018	Singapore National Football League	0	0	0	0	0	0	0	0	0	0	0	0
Young Lions (loan)	2019	Singapore Premier League	19	0	0	0	0	0	0	0	0	0	19	0
Hougang United	2020	Singapore Premier League	11	0	0	0	0	0	0	0	0	0	11	0
Hougang United	2021	Singapore Premier League	18	3	0	0	0	0	0	0	0	0	18	3
Hougang United	2022	Singapore Premier League	21	0	6	0	0	0	3	0	0		30	0
Hougang United	Total		50	3	6	0	0	0	3	0	0	0	59	3
Lion City Sailors	2023	Singapore Premier League	24	2	6	0	0	0	5	0	0	0	35	2
Lion City Sailors	2024–25	Singapore Premier League	16	0	0	0	0	0	6	0	4	0	26	0
Lion City Sailors	2025–26	Singapore Premier League	10	0	3	0	0	0	3	0	6 (Note: 1 appearance in Community Shield & 5 appearance in Shopee Cup.)	0	22	0
Lion City Sailors	2026–27	Singapore Premier League	0	0	0	0	0	0	0	0	0	0	0	0
Lion City Sailors	Total		50	2	9	0	0	0	14	0	11	0	83	2
Career total			138	5	20	0	3	0	17	0	10	0	177	5

=== International ===
==== International caps ====
No	Date	Venue	Opponent	Result	Competition
1	23 March 2023	Mong Kok Stadium, Hong Kong	Hong Kong	1–1 (draw)	Friendly
2	26 March 2023	Macau Olympic Complex Stadium, Macau	Macau	1–0 (won)	Friendly
3	16 June 2023	National Stadium, Singapore	Papua New Guinea	2-2 (draw)	Friendly
4	18 June 2023	National Stadium, Singapore	Solomon Islands	1-1 (draw)	Friendly
5	8 Sept 2023	Bishan Stadium, Singapore	Tajikistan	0-2 (lost)	Friendly
6	12 Sept 2023	Bishan Stadium, Singapore	Chinese Taipei	3-1 (win)	Friendly

==== International goals ====
No	Date	Venue	Opponent	Score	Result	Competition
1	23 March 2023	Mong Kok Stadium, Hong Kong	Hong Kong	1–1	1–1	Friendly
2	26 March 2023	Macau Olympic Complex Stadium, Macau	Macau	1–0	1–0	Friendly
3	12 September 2023	Bishan Stadium, Bishan, Singapore	Chinese Taipei	2–1	3–1	Friendly

==== U23 International goals ====
No	Date	Venue	Opponent	Score	Result	Competition
1	22 March 2019	MFF Football Centre, Mongolia	Hong Kong	1–1	1–1 (draw)	2020 AFC U-23 Championship qualification

==== U23 International caps ====
- Result column lists Singapore U22 score first.

No	Date	Venue	Opponent	Result	Competition
1	9 July 2017	Choa Chu Kang Stadium, Singapore	India	0–1 (lost)	Friendly
2	12 July 2017	Choa Chu Kang Stadium, Singapore	India	1–0 (win)	Friendly
3	22 March 2019	MFF Football Centre, Ulaanbaatar, Mongolia	Hong Kong	1–1 (draw)	2020 AFC U-23 Championship qualification
4	24 March 2019	MFF Football Centre, Ulaanbaatar, Mongolia	North Korea	1–1 (draw)	2020 AFC U-23 Championship qualification
5	26 March 2019	MFF Football Centre, Ulaanbaatar, Mongolia	Mongolia	3–1 (win)	2020 AFC U-23 Championship qualification
6	7 June 2019	Jalan Besar Stadium, Kallang, Singapore	Philippines	3–0 (win)	2019 Merlion Cup
7	9 June 2019	Jalan Besar Stadium, Kallang, Singapore	Thailand	1–0 (win)	2019 Merlion Cup
8	9 October 2019	Bishan Stadium, Bishan, Singapore	United Arab Emirates	0–3 (lost)	Friendly
9	26 November 2019	Rizal Memorial Stadium, Manila, Philippines	Laos	0–0 (draw)	2019 Southeast Asian Games
10	28 November 2019	Rizal Memorial Stadium, Manila, Philippines	Indonesia	0–2 (lost)	2019 Southeast Asian Games
11	1 December 2019	Biñan Football Stadium, Manila, Philippines	Thailand	0–3 (lost)	2019 Southeast Asian Games

==== U19 International caps ====
- Result column lists Singapore U19 score first.

No	Date	Venue	Opponent	Result	Competition
1	23 August 2015	Laos National Stadium, Vientiane, Laos	Myanmar	0–1	2015 AFF U-19 Youth Championship
2	25 August 2015	Laos National Stadium, Vientiane, Laos	Malaysia	0–4	2015 AFF U-19 Youth Championship
3	29 August 2015	Laos National Stadium, Vientiane, Laos	Vietnam	0–6	2015 AFF U-19 Youth Championship
4	31 August 2015	Laos National Stadium, Vientiane, Laos	Timor-Leste	1–1	2015 AFF U-19 Youth Championship
5	30 September 2015	SCG Stadium, Nonthaburi, Thailand	Northern Mariana Islands	10–0	2016 AFC U-19 Championship qualification
6	4 October 2015	SCG Stadium, Nonthaburi, Thailand	Thailand	0–3	2016 AFC U-19 Championship qualification
7	6 October 2015	SCG Stadium, Nonthaburi, Thailand	Chinese Taipei	2–2	2016 AFC U-19 Championship qualification
8	11 September 2016	Hàng Đẫy Stadium, Hanoi, Vietnam	Vietnam	0–0	2016 AFF U-19 Youth Championship
9	15 September 2016	Hàng Đẫy Stadium, Hanoi, Vietnam	Malaysia	1–2	2016 AFF U-19 Youth Championship
10	17 September 2016	Hàng Đẫy Stadium, Hanoi, Vietnam	Philippines	2–1	2016 AFF U-19 Youth Championship
11	19 September 2016	Hàng Đẫy Stadium, Hanoi, Vietnam	Timor-Leste	0–2	2016 AFF U-19 Youth Championship
12	4 August 2017	Hartfield Park, Australia	Australia	0–4	Friendly

== Honours ==
Home United

- Prime League: 2016
- Singapore FA Cup: 2016

Hougang United

- Singapore Cup: 2022

Lion City Sailors

- AFC Champions League Two runner-up: 2024–25
- Singapore Premier League: 2024–25
- Singapore Cup: 2023, 2024–25, 2025–26
- Singapore Community Shield: 2024; runner-up: 2025

Singapore U22

- Merlion Cup: 2019
