= Ridhuan Barudin =

Singaporean footballer

Personal information
- Full name: Muhammad Ridhuan Bin Barudin
- Date of birth: 23 March 1987 (age 39)
- Place of birth: Singapore
- Height: 1.82 m (5 ft 11 1/2 in)
- Position: Goalkeeper

Team information
- Current team: Hougang United
- Number: 31

Youth career
- 2005–2008: National Football Academy

Senior career*
Years	Team	Apps	(Gls)
2009–2010	Tampines Rovers	3	(0)
2011	Tanjong Pagar United	28	(0)
2012	Geylang United	7	(0)
2013–2014	Tampines Rovers	6	(0)
2015–2022	Hougang United	61	(0)
2023–2025	Tampines Rovers	5	(0)
2025–	Hougang United	33	(0)
- * Club domestic league appearances and goals as of 27 October 2011

Muhammad Ridhuan Bin Barudin (born 23 March 1987), nicknamed Ah Hong by fans, is a Singaporean professional footballer who plays as a goalkeeper for Singapore Premier League club Hougang United.

== Club career ==
=== Tampines Rovers ===
Ridhuan began his career with Tampines Rovers in 2009.

=== Tanjong Pagar United ===
Ridhuan's next move was to Tanjong Pagar United in January 2011. His performances with the Jaguars earned him a call-up to the Singapore national team.

=== Geylang United ===
Following the conclusion of the 2011 S.League season, Geylang United acted swiftly to sign Ridhuan in January 2012 to provide competition for veteran goalkeeper Yazid Yasin.

=== Back to Tampines Rovers ===
Ridhuan moved back to Tampines Rovers after a year with Geylang United where he was also retained for the 2014 S.League season.

=== Hougang United ===
Ridhuan first signed for Hougang United for the 2015 S.League season and established himself as the first choice goalkeeper after starving off challenges from Basil Chan and Ahmadulhaq Che Omar. Following his performances in 2015, he was subsequently handed a contract extension for the 2016 season. He was, however, dislodged by new signing Khairulhin Khalid at the start of the 2016 season. After making over 40 appearances for the club, Ridhuan was retained by the club for the 2017 S.League season. It was announced in late December 2017 that Riduan will be staying at Hougang United for a fourth consecutive season after agreeing to a contract extension.

In 2022, Ridhuan was ruled out midway of the 2022 Singapore Premier League for medical reasons. He was then released at the end of the season along with 3 other teammates.

=== Third stint at Tampines Rovers ===
Ridhuan signed with Tampines Rovers ahead of the 2023 Singapore Premier League season to bolster the goalkeeping department. He made his debut in a 2–0 victory over DPMM on 20 April. Ridhuan was selected in goal after main goalkeeper, Syazwan Buhari is out due to injury in July where Ridhuan played in three consecutives matches.

Ridhuan make his first start of the 2024–25 season keeping a clean sheet in a 2–0 win over Young Lions on 6 July 2024.

== International career ==
Ridhuan received his first international call-up in August 2011 for a friendly match against Thailand and two 2014 FIFA World Cup qualifying matches against China and Iraq.

== Career statistics ==
As of 27 Feb 2022

Club	Season	S.League		Singapore Cup		Singapore League Cup		Asia		Total	
Club	Season	Apps	Goals	Apps	Goals	Apps	Goals	Apps	Goals	Apps	Goals
Tampines Rovers	2010	3	0	0	0	1	0	0	0	4	0
Tampines Rovers	Total	3	0	0	0	1	0	0	0	4	0
Tanjong Pagar United	2011	27	0	1	0	0	0	0	0	28	0
Tanjong Pagar United	Total	27	0	1	0	0	0	0	0	28	0
Geylang International	2012	2	0	0	0	5	0	0	0	7	0
Geylang International	Total	2	0	0	0	5	0	0	0	7	0
Tampines Rovers	2013	5	0	0	0	2	0	1	0	8	0
Tampines Rovers	2014	1	0	1	0	2	0	0	0	4	0
Tampines Rovers	Total	6	0	1	0	4	0	1	0	12	0
Hougang United	2015	24	0	1	0	3	0	0	0	27	0
Hougang United	2016	3	0	0	0	5	0	0	0	8	0
Hougang United	2017	7	0	1	0	3	0	0	0	11	0
Hougang United	2018	5	0	2	0	0	0	0	0	7	0
Hougang United	2019	17	0	1	0	0	0	0	0	18	0
Hougang United	2020	10	0	0	0	0	0	0	0	10	0
Hougang United	2021	7	0	0	0	0	0	0	0	7	0
Hougang United	2022	1	0	0	0	0	0	0	0	1	0
Hougang United	Total	73	0	5	0	11	0	0	0	89	0
Tampines Rovers	2023	4	0	0	0	0	0	0	0	4	0
Tampines Rovers	2024–25	1	0	0	0	0	0	0	0	0	0
Tampines Rovers	Total	5	0	0	0	0	0	0	0	5	0
Career total		116	0	7	0	21	0	1	0	145	0

== Honours ==
=== Club ===
Hougang United

- Singapore Cup: 2022
