= Antoine Viterale =

Hong Kong footballer (born 1996)

Personal information
- Full name: Antoine Viterale
- Date of birth: 1 July 1996 (age 30)
- Place of birth: Hong Kong
- Height: 1.85 m (6 ft 1 in)
- Position: Forward

Team information
- Current team: Quimper Kerfeunteun

Youth career
- –2012: Kitchee
- 2012–2013: Lugano
- 2013–2014: Espanyol
- 2014–2015: Chievo
- 2015: Hellas Verona

Senior career*
Years	Team	Apps	(Gls)
2016–2018	Hougang United	31	(1)
2019–2020	Lugano U21	7	(4)
2022–	Quimper Kerfeunteun	7	(4)
- * Club domestic league appearances and goals as of 3 November 2019

Antoine Viterale (born 1 July 1996) is a former professional footballer currently playing in France for Quimper Kerfeunteun. He describes himself as a left-winger rather than a centre-forward.

== Youth career ==
Viterale was born to an Italian father and a French mother. His father, Giovanni Viterale, worked for Conrad Hotel, while in Hong Kong. Viterale lived in Hong Kong for 14 years since birth and was an academy player for Kitchee. He signed for Swiss side FC Lugano's U-18 squad, before breaking into RCD Espanyol's youth ranks. He would later move to Italian club Chievo Verona., before switching to Hellas Verona. Viterale trialed with Inter Milan in 2010 but was not offered a contract.

In December 2015, Viterale moved with his family into a condominium in Singapore. Originally, he was set to play for Tampines Rovers' Prime League team but the striker tore his ankle ligaments during a training session. Around May 2016 he got a call from an agent who explained that Garena Young Lions were seeking a striker so Viterale trained there for a few months; however, the forward never got a contract there despite having forged a good relationship with then coach Patrick Hesse.

== Club career ==
=== Hougang United ===
Viterale signed with Hougang United in December 2016 after scoring in two friendlies against MISC-MIFA and DRB-Hicom. Making his debut in a 2-0 triumph over Garena Young Lions, Viterale scored his first goal for Hougang United against Ceres–Negros in the 2017 Singapore Cup on 20 June 2017.

=== Lugano ===
On 3 March 2019, Viterale returned to Europe, signing with Swiss Super League club Lugano.

=== Quimper Kerfeunteun FC ===
On 16 January 2022, Viterale joined Quimper Kerfeunteun FC of the Brittany Football League of Regional 1, the sixth tier league of French football after taking a career break.

== Career statistics ==
=== Club ===
As of 14 July 2019.

Appearances and goals by club, season and competition
Club	Season	League			Singapore Cup		League Cup		Other		Total	
Club	Season	Division	Apps	Goals	Apps	Goals	Apps	Goals	Apps	Goals	Apps	Goals
Hougang United	2017	S.League	13	0	2	1	1	0	—		16	1
Hougang United	2018	Singapore Premier League	18	1	2	0	0	0	—		20	1
Hougang United	Total		31	1	4	1	1	0	—		36	2
Career total			31	1	4	1	1	0	—		36	2

== Personal life ==
His family currently resides in Singapore.

== International career ==
Viterale was born and raised in Hong Kong. He had the opportunity to represent the Under-17 team, however he declined the invitation.

On 5 June 2023, Viterale along with Michael Udebuluzor were invited to train with the Hong Kong national football team with a possible view to represent the national team.
