= Syahiran Miswan =

Singaporean footballer

Personal information
- Date of birth: 22 January 1994 (age 32)
- Place of birth: Singapore
- Position: Midfielder

Team information
- Current team: Yishun Sentek Mariners
- Number: 6

Youth career
- Singapore Sports School
- 2014: NFA U17
- 2015: Home United

Senior career*
Years	Team	Apps	(Gls)
2016	Home United		
2017–2018	Hougang United		
2019	Geylang International	?	(?)
2022–	Yishun Sentek Mariners	0	(0)
- * Club domestic league appearances and goals as of December 28, 2016

Syahiran Miswan is a Singaporean former footballer who played as a midfielder for Singapore National League Yishun Sentek Mariners. He started his professional career with Home United after graduating from the National Football Academy.

== Club career ==
=== NFA U17 ===
Syahiran started his career with NFA U17 after graduation in 2015.

=== Home United ===
Syahiran moved to the Protectors in 2015 and returned to where he started his youth career. He was part of the team which win the 2016 Singapore Cup semi final against Balestier Khalsa.

=== Hougang United ===
Syahiran move to Houang United in 2017. He was released due to a string of poor performances and was picked up by backmarker Geylang International.

=== Geylang International ===
Syahiran was sent off in a game against DPMM FC for a foul on Andrey Varankow as his team finished 5th at the end of the 2019 Singapore Premier League season.

He was contract was not renewed at the end of the season.
