= Fabian Kwok =

Singaporean footballer

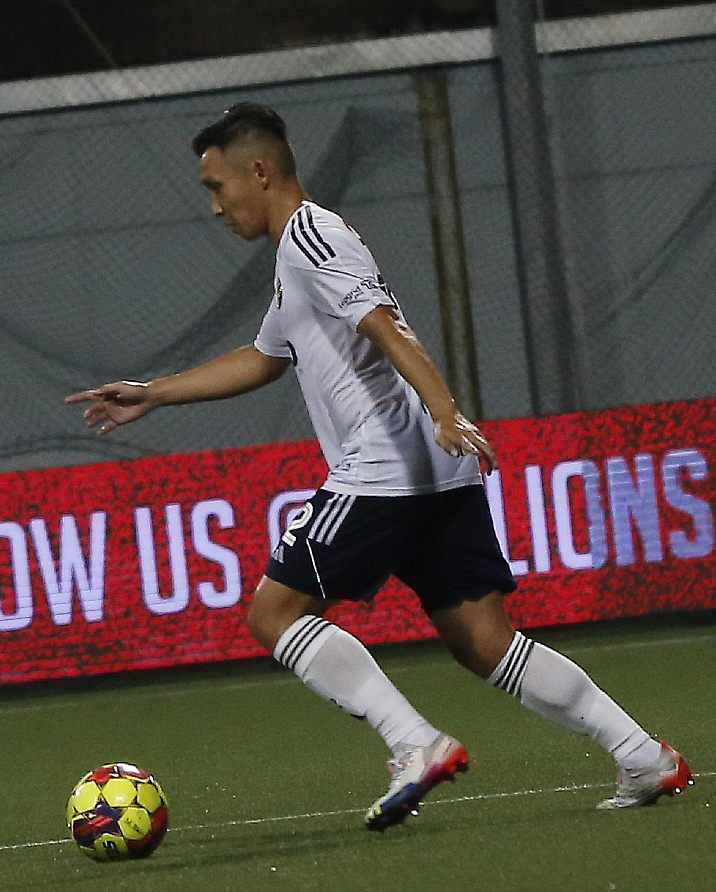
- Kwok in 2023

Personal information
- Full name: Fabian Kwok Wing Hong
- Date of birth: March 17, 1989 (age 37)
- Place of birth: Singapore
- Height: 1.75 m (5 ft 9 in)
- Positions: Defender; midfielder

Senior career*
Years	Team	Apps	(Gls)
2009	Young Lions FC	6	(0)
2010	Geylang International	5	(0)
2012–2014	Geylang International	43	(3)
2015–2016	Tampines Rovers	31	(3)
2017–2022	Hougang United	122	(9)
2023–	Balestier Khalsa	10	(1)
- * Club domestic league appearances and goals as of Jan 7, 2016

Fabian Kwok Wing Hong (born 17 March 1989), better known as Fabian, is a Singaporean former footballer who played primarily as a centre-back. A versatile player, he is also capable of playing as a defensive-midfielder and central-midfielder. He is considered a club legend for Hougang United making over 100 appearances for the club.

== Career ==
Fabian Kwok plays in the Singapore Premier League for Tampines Rovers F.C, Geylang International F.C, Young Lions FC, Hougang United F.C and currently Balestier Khalsa F.C. The highlight of his career came when he scored long ranged goal for the Eagles from the halfway line.

== Career statistics ==
As of 10 Oct 2021

Club	Season	S.League		Singapore Cup		Singapore League Cup		Asia		Total	
Club	Season	Apps	Goals	Apps	Goals	Apps	Goals	Apps	Goals	Apps	Goals
Geylang International	2010	5	0	0	0	0	0	0	0	5	0
Geylang International	2012	8	0	0	0	5	0	0	0	13	0
Geylang International	2013	14	1	1	0	2	0	0	0	17	1
Geylang International	2014	21	2	3	0	3	0	0	0	27	2
Geylang International	Total	48	3	3	0	10	0	0	0	62	3
Tampines Rovers	2015	23	1	1	0	1	0	0	0	25	1
Tampines Rovers	2016	9	0	1	0	4	1	4	0	18	1
Tampines Rovers	Total	32	1	2	0	5	1	4	0	43	2
Hougang United	2017	19	0	5	1	3	0	0	0	27	1
Hougang United	2018	22	0	1	0	0	0	0	0	23	0
Hougang United	2019	19	0	0	0	0	0	0	0	19	0
Hougang United	2020	13	0	0	0	1	0	2	0	16	0
Hougang United	2021	18	2	0	0	0	0	0	0	18	2
Hougang United	2022	0	0	0	0	0	0	0	0	0	0
Hougang United	Total	91	2	6	0	4	0	2	0	103	2
Balestier Khalsa	2023	0	0	0	0	0	0	0	0	0	0
Balestier Khalsa	Total	0	0	0	0	0	0	0	0	0	0
Career total		146	5	7	0	5	0	13	2	172	8

== Honours ==
=== Club ===
Hougang United

- Singapore Cup: 2022
