= Faiz Salleh =

Singaporean footballer

Personal information
- Date of birth: 17 July 1992 (age 34)
- Place of birth: Singapore
- Height: 1.69 m (5 ft 7 in)
- Position: Full-back

Senior career*
Years	Team	Apps	(Gls)
2013	Courts Young Lions	13	(0)
2014–2022	Hougang United	110	(3)
- * Club domestic league appearances and goals

Faiz Salleh (born 17 July 1992) is a Singaporean former footballer who last played as a full-back for Singapore Premier League club Hougang United. He made 110 appearances for the Cheetahs, retiring after the 2022 campaign and helping the Cheetahs win the 2022 Singapore Cup.

== Career ==
Faiz Salleh played in the S.League for Courts Young Lions and currently Hougang United. The highlight of his career came in July 2014, in which he scored a goal in the 3–0 triumph over reigning champions Balestier Khalsa in the 2014 Singapore League Cup.

== Honours ==
=== Club ===
Hougang United

- Singapore Cup: 2022
