= Hougang Stadium =

Multi-purpose stadium in Hougang, Singapore

- Pusat Sukan Hougang (Malay) 后港体育场 (Chinese) ஹவ்காங் விளையாட்டரங்கம் (Tamil)
- Workers' Party general election rally at Hougang Stadium, 2015
- Interactive map of Hougang Stadium
- Full name: Hougang ActiveSG Stadium
- Address: 100 Hougang Ave 2, Singapore 538856
- Location: Hougang, Singapore
- Owner: Sport Singapore
- Operator: Sport Singapore
- Capacity: 2,500
- Surface: Grass
- Public transit: NE14 Hougang

Construction
- Opened: 14 September 1987; 39 years ago
- Renovated: 2014

Tenant
- Hougang United (1998–2018, 2020–2022)

Hougang Stadium is a multi-purpose stadium located in Hougang, Singapore. It formerly served as the home ground of Hougang United FC, a Singapore Premier League football club. The stadium has also hosted football matches for various league competitions organised by the Football Association of Singapore (FAS), including Under 17 and Under 15 Youth League football matches.

The stadium is managed by Sport Singapore, and like most stadiums in Singapore, it is generally open to the public daily from 4.30am till 9.30pm, unless exclusively booked.

It has also occasionally hosted political rallies during Singapore's general elections, including those organised by the ruling People's Action Party (PAP) and opposition parties such as the Workers' Party (WP).

== History ==
Hougang Stadium is part of the Hougang Sport Centre, a community sports facility that also comprises the Hougang Swimming Complex and Hougang Sports Hall. The sports centre was developed in phases, with the swimming complex opening first on 24 May 1987. The stadium, constructed at a cost of approximately S$12 million, was handed over to the Singapore Sports Council on 31 August 1987, and opened to the public on 14 September 1987.

The stadium served as the home ground of Hougang United FC and its predecessors, Marine Castle United, Sengkang Marine, and Sengkang Punggol FC, from 1998 to 2018, and again from 2020 to 2022. Following changes to the venues used for Singapore Premier League matches, Hougang United's home matches were moved to Jalan Besar Stadium.

On 1 April 2024, the Hougang Sport Centre, including the stadium, was closed for renovation. The redevelopment included an expanded gym, upgrades to the indoor sports hall to accommodate activities such as basketball, badminton, and pickleball, and the refurbishment of the stadium's running track. The works were completed in June 2026.

== Facilities & structures ==
The stadium has a seating capacity of 2,500, comprising 1,500 permanent, and 1,000 semi-permanent seats. Its facilities include a football field, an eight lane running track, several athletic facilities, and a fitness corner.

== International fixtures ==
To date, only two international matches have been played at the stadium due to its limited seating capacity. Most international matches in Singapore are instead held at Jalan Besar Stadium or the National Stadium.

Date	Competition	Team	Score	Team
6 September 2014	Friendly	Singapore	2–1	Papua New Guinea
9 September 2014	Friendly	Singapore	0–0	Hong Kong

== See also ==
- List of stadiums in Singapore
