= Nurhilmi Jasni =

Singaporean footballer

Personal information
- Date of birth: 17 December 1986 (age 39)
- Place of birth: Singapore
- Height: 1.75 m (5 ft 9 in)
- Position: Midfielder

Team information
- Current team: Hougang United
- Number: 19

Senior career*
Years	Team	Apps	(Gls)
2008–2009	Tampines Rovers	1	(0)
2010–2011	Balestier Khalsa	52	(2)
2012–2019	Hougang United	132	(16)
- * Club domestic league appearances and goals

Nurhilmi Jasni (born 17 December 1986) is a Singaporean professional footballer who currently plays for Hougang United in the S.League. He plays as a midfielder.

== Career ==
Nurhilmi Jasni played in the S.League for Tampines Rovers, Balestier Khalsa and currently Hougang United. The highlight of his career came in April 2013, in which he scored a brace to help the Cheetahs to a victory over Harimau Muda B.
