= Clement Teo =

Singaporean association football coach

Personal information
- Place of birth: Singapore

Managerial career
- Years: Team
- –2011: Katong FC
- 2012–2013: Woodlands Wellington (assistant)
- 2014–2015: Tampines Rovers (team manager)
- 2018–2022: Hougang United
- 2023: Boeung Ket
- 2023–2025: Boeung Ket (technical director)

Clement Teo is a Singaporean association football coach who was most recently technical director of Cambodian Premier League club, Boeung Ket.

== Managerial career ==
=== Katong FC ===
Clement was the head coach of NFL Division 2 side, Katong Football Club in 2010 where at the same time, he was also a S.League match commissioner.

=== Woodlands Wellington ===
In 2012, Clement become assistant coach under Salim Moin of the S.League side, Woodlands Wellington. Apart from his coaching duties in Woodlands, he is usually the appointed spokesperson who addresses the media on behalf of the club.

=== Hougang United ===
In 2018, Clement was appointed as the head coach of Hougang United where he guided the club to win their first ever piece of silverware in the club history.

=== Boueng Ket ===
On 27 January 2023, Clement was appointed as the Cambodian side new head coach of Boeung Ket. On 15 December 2023, he was appointed as technical director of the club. On 19 July 2025, Boeung Ket announced the departure of Clement as technical director.

== Honours ==
=== Manager ===
==== Hougang United ====
- Singapore Cup: 2022

=== Individual ===
- Singapore Premier League Coach of the Year: 2021

== Performance by club ==
The following table provides a summary of Clement's record as coach.

Statistics correct as of 13 November 2018

Club	Period	Pld	W	D	L	Win %	Achievements
(Singapore) Hougang United	June 2018	16	2	3	11	12.5	
