= Atsushi Shirota =

Japanese footballer

Personal information
- Date of birth: November 6, 1991 (age 34)
- Place of birth: Nagano, Japan
- Height: 1.81 m (5 ft 11 1/2 in)
- Position: Defender

Youth career
- 2010–2013: National Institute of Fitness and Sports in Kanoya

Senior career*
Years	Team	Apps	(Gls)
2014–2015	V-Varen Nagasaki	2	(0)
2016	Albirex Niigata FC (Singapore)	30	(3)
2017	Hougang United	23	(0)
2018	Phnom Penh Crown	12	(3)
- * Club domestic league appearances and goals as of Jan 7, 2016

Atsushi Shirota (代田 敦資, Shirota Atsushi; born November 6, 1991) is a retired Japanese footballer. He is a defender.

He was educated at and played for the National Institute of Fitness and Sports in Kanoya before signing for J2 club, V-Varen Nagasaki. In 2016, he signed for Albirex Niigata FC (Singapore) from the S.League before moving to Sleauge club, Hougang United. In 2018, he signed for Cambodian club Phnom Penh Crown FC. On 7 March 2019, he announced his retirement from football at the age of 27.

== Club career statistics ==
As of Jan 2, 2017

Club performance			League		Cup		League Cup		Total	
Season	Club	League	Apps	Goals	Apps	Goals	Apps	Goals	Apps	Goals
Japan / Singapore			League		Singapore Cup / Emperor’s Cup		League Cup		Total	
2014	V-Varen Nagasaki	J2 League	0	0	0	0	0	0	0	0
2015	V-Varen Nagasaki	J2 League	0	0	2	0	0	0	2	0
2016	Albirex Niigata FC (S)	S.League	23	3	5	0	2	0	30	3
2017	Hougang United	S.League	23	0	6	0	3	0	32	0
2018	Phnom Penh Crown FC	Cambodian League	?	?	?	?	?	?	?	?
Total
Total	Japan		0	0	2	0	0	0	2	0
Total	Singapore		46	3	11	0	5	0	62	3
Total	Cambodia		0	0	0	0	0	0	0	0
Career total			23	3	7	0	2	0	32	3
