= Fairoz Hasan =

Singaporean footballer

Fairoz Hassan
Personal information
- Full name: Muhammad Fairoz bin Hasan
- Date of birth: 26 November 1988 (age 37)
- Place of birth: Singapore
- Height: 1.71 m (5 ft 7 1/2 in)
- Position: Forward

Team information
- Current team: Hougang United
- Number: 9

Youth career
- 2008: Sengkang Punggol

Senior career*
| Years | Team | Apps | (Gls) |
| 2008–2010 | Young Lions | 29 | (1) |
| 2010 | Geylang United | 1 | (0) |
| 2011 | Young Lions | 13 | (0) |
| 2012 | Gombak United | 17 | (1) |
| 2013–2017 | Hougang United | 87 | (4) |
| 2018 | Geylang International | 22 | (7) |
| 2019 | Warriors F.C. | 9 | (3) |
| 2020-2022 | Albirex Niigata (S) | 14 | (1) |
| 2023– | Hougang United | 10 | (0) |
- * Club domestic league appearances and goals as of 05:37 11 October 2019 (AEST)

Muhammad Fairoz bin Hasan (born 26 November 1988) is a Singaporean footballer who plays as a striker, right-winger or attacking-midfielder for Singapore Premier League club Hougang United.

== Career ==
Fairoz started his career at Sengkang Punggol in 2008. He was selected to represent Singapore in the Vietnam Under-21 Open competition.

Fairoz was fined $1,500 and banned for eight months for his involvement in the fight on Sept 7 2010 between the Young Lions and Beijing Guoan Talent, during a S.League match at Jalan Besar Stadium.

== Career statistics ==
=== Club ===
As of 29 March 2021.

| Club | Season | League | | | Singapore Cup | | League Cup | | Total | |
| Club | Season | Division | Apps | Goals | Apps | Goals | Apps | Goals | Apps | Goals |
|---|---|---|---|---|---|---|---|---|---|---|
| Gombak United | 2012 | SPL | 17 | 1 | 3 | 2 | 2 | 0 | 22 | 3 |
| Gombak United | Total | | 17 | 1 | 3 | 2 | 2 | 0 | 22 | 3 |
| Hougang United | 2013 | SPL | 20 | 1 | 1 | 0 | 1 | 0 | 22 | 1 |
| Hougang United | 2014 | SPL | 20 | 1 | 1 | 0 | 4 | 0 | 25 | 1 |
| Hougang United | 2015 | SPL | 19 | 2 | 1 | 0 | 4 | 0 | 24 | 2 |
| Hougang United | 2016 | SPL | 19 | 0 | 1 | 0 | 3 | 0 | 23 | 0 |
| Hougang United | 2017 | SPL | 10 | 1 | 3 | 1 | 3 | 1 | 16 | 3 |
| Hougang United | Total | | 85 | 5 | 7 | 1 | 15 | 1 | 107 | 7 |
| Geylang International | 2018 | SPL | 22 | 7 | 2 | 0 | 0 | 0 | 24 | 7 |
| Geylang International | Total | | 22 | 7 | 2 | 0 | 0 | 0 | 24 | 7 |
| Warriors FC | 2019 | SPL | 8 | 3 | 3 | 1 | 0 | 0 | 11 | 4 |
| Warriors FC | Total | | 8 | 3 | 3 | 1 | 0 | 0 | 11 | 4 |
| Albirex Niigata (S) | 2020 | SPL | 11 | 1 | 0 | 0 | 0 | 0 | 11 | 1 |
| Albirex Niigata (S) | 2021 | SPL | 8 | 0 | 0 | 0 | 0 | 0 | 8 | 0 |
| Albirex Niigata (S) | 2022 | SPL | 8 | 1 | 0 | 0 | 1 | 0 | 9 | 1 |
| Albirex Niigata (S) | Total | | 27 | 2 | 0 | 0 | 1 | 0 | 28 | 1 |
| Career total | | | 19 | 1 | 0 | 0 | 0 | 0 | 19 | 1 |

== Honours ==
=== Hougang United ===
- Singapore Cup Champions (1): 2022
- Singapore Cup Runner-ups (1): 2023
