= Iqbal Hussain =

Singaporean footballer

Personal information
- Full name: Mohamed Iqbal bin Hamid Hussain
- Date of birth: 6 June 1993 (age 33)
- Place of birth: Singapore
- Height: 1.86 m (6 ft 1 in)
- Position: Forward

Senior career*
Years	Team	Apps	(Gls)
2012	Gombak United	7	(3)
2013	LionsXII	1	(0)
2013–2015	Courts Young Lions	48	(9)
2016–2019	Hougang United	62	(12)
2020	Geylang International	14	(2)
2020–2021	Chennai City	10	(3)
2021	Balestier Khalsa	6	(0)
2023–2025	Geylang International	49	(8)

International career^{‡}
2013	Singapore U23		
2013–2025	Singapore	9	(0)
Medal record
Men's football
Representing Singapore
Sea Games
Bronze medal – third place	Sea Games 2013	Football
- * Club domestic league appearances and goals as of 23:43, 10 October 2021 (UTC) ‡ National team caps and goals as of 21 March 2019

Mohamed Iqbal bin Hamid Hussain (born 6 June 1993), more commonly known as Iqbal Hussain is a Singaporean professional footballer who last played as a winger or striker for the Singapore Premier League club Geylang International and the Singapore national team.

== Club career ==
=== Gombak United ===
Iqbal started his career at Gombak United where he scored 2 goals in 7 league games in the 2012 S.League.

=== LionsXII ===
In 2013, Iqbal joined Malaysia Super League club LionsXII after Gombak United withdrew from the S.League at the end of the 2012 season.

=== Young Lions ===
Restricted to one league appearance in the 2013 season and in need for match experience leading to the Southeast Asian Games, Iqbal was de-registered in April 2013 and joined under-23 developmental side Courts Young Lions in the S.League. He scored a total of 8 goals in 44 games during his 3 years stint with the club.

=== Hougang United ===
In 2016, Iqbal joined Hougang United. Although he did not have much playing time due to his National Service, Iqbal worked hard and impressed when he got to play and he even got a recall to the national team in 2016. In total, he finished the season with 6 goals, 8 assists in 24 games across all competitions. He even earned an S.League Goal of the Year nomination. His performances led to a contraction extension into the 2017 S.League season. However, due to his NS commitments, Iqbal was hardly able to make himself available for the Cheetahs, missing huge chunks of the season. After serving his NS in August 2017, Iqbal started featuring more prominently for the club. His efforts paid off as he was offered a contract extension for the 2018 S.League season.

==== Trials at Sukhothai ====
Iqbal went for trials in Thailand where he was offered a contract with Thai League 1 side, Sukhothai. However, the deal collapsed at the last minute.

=== Geylang International ===
Iqbal signed for the Eagles for the 2020 Singapore Premier League season and scored twice in his 2nd appearance for the team.

=== Chennai City ===
Iqbal became the first Singaporean to play in the I-League when he signed for Chennai City in December 2020. In the final game of the season, Iqbal scored the winner in the 94th minute to help his team finish 2-1 winners over already relegated NEROCA for his 3rd goal in 3 games. He scored 3 goals and made 2 assists in 10 games to help his team starve off relegation.

=== Balestier Khalsa ===
After a great stint with the I-League side Chennai City in India, Iqbal returned to his home country and signed for the Singapore Premier League side Balestier Khalsa for the remainder of the 2021 season. He made his first start for the Tigers in a 3–2 loss to developmental side Young Lions.

=== Returned to Geylang International ===
After a year of being a free agent, Iqbal re-joined his former club, Geylang International for the 2023 season.

== International career ==
Iqbal was part of the Singapore national under-23 team that won the bronze medal at the 2013 Southeast Asian Games. Iqbal represented Singapore U23 at the 2014 Asian Games.

Iqbal was called up to the senior team in July 2013. However, he made his senior international debut in the 35th minute of a friendly match against Papua New Guinea on 6 September 2014.

He earned the last of his seven Lions caps in 2019.

On 12 September 2023, Iqbal returns to the Singapore squad and was on the starting line up against Chinese Taipei making his first cap since 2019. He had earned praises for his performance throughout the match.

== Career statistics ==
=== Club ===
As of match played 10 May 2023. Caps and goals may not be correct.

Club	Season	S.League		Singapore Cup		Singapore League Cup		Asia		Total	
Club	Season	Apps	Goals	Apps	Goals	Apps	Goals	Apps	Goals	Apps	Goals
Gombak United	2012	7	2	3	1	1	0	—		11	3
Gombak United	Total	7	2	3	1	1	0	0	0	11	3
Club	Season	Malaysia Super League		Malaysia FA Cup		Malaysia Cup		Asia		Total	
LionsXII	2013	1	0	0	0	0	0	—		1	0
LionsXII	Total	1	0	0	0	0	0	0	0	1	0
Club	Season	S.League		Singapore Cup		Singapore League Cup		Asia		Total	
Young Lions	2013	19	2	1	0	3	1	—		23	3
Young Lions	2014	25	4	-	-	-	-	—		25	4
Young Lions	2015	4	2	-	-	-	-	—		4	2
Young Lions	Total	44	8	1	0	3	1	0	0	52	9
Hougang United	2016	18	4	1	0	5	2	—		24	6
Hougang United	2017	13	3	3	0	2	0	—		18	3
Hougang United	2018	19	4	2	0	0	0	—		21	4
Hougang United	2019	12	1	2	0	0	0	—		14	1
Hougang United	Total	62	12	8	0	7	2	0	0	77	14
Geylang International	2020	14	2	0	0	0	0	—		14	2
Geylang International	Total	14	2	0	0	0	0	0	0	14	2
Club	Season	I.League		FA Cup		League Cup		Asia		Total	
Club	Season	Apps	Goals	Apps	Goals	Apps	Goals	Apps	Goals	Apps	Goals
Chennai City FC	2021	10	3	0	0	0	0	—		10	3
Chennai City FC	Total	10	3	0	0	0	0	0	0	10	3
Club	Season	S.League		Singapore Cup		Singapore League Cup		Asia		Total	
Balestier Khalsa	2021	6	0	0	0	0	0	—		6	0
Balestier Khalsa	Total	6	0	0	0	0	0	0	0	6	0
Geylang International	2023	23	6	0	0	0	0	—		23	6
Geylang International	2024–25	13	1	0	0	0	0	0	0	13	1
Geylang International	Total	36	7	0	0	0	0	0	0	36	7
Career Total		180	32	9	0	10	3	0	0	199	35

- Young Lions and LionsXII are ineligible for qualification to AFC competitions in their respective leagues.

== International statistics ==
=== International caps ===
No	Date	Venue	Opponent	Result	Competition
4	12 Sept 2023	Bishan Stadium, Singapore	Chinese Taipei	3-1 (win)	Friendly

=== U19 International caps ===
No	Date	Venue	Opponent	Result	Competition
1	31 October 2011	Petaling Jaya Stadium, Selangor, Malaysia	Macau	0–0 (draw)	2012 AFC U-19 Championship qualification
2	2 November 2011	Petaling Jaya Stadium, Selangor, Malaysia	Australia	0–1 (lost)	2012 AFC U-19 Championship qualification
3	4 November 2011	Petaling Jaya Stadium, Selangor, Malaysia	China	0–11 (lost)	2012 AFC U-19 Championship qualification
4	8 November 2011	Petaling Jaya Stadium, Selangor, Malaysia	Indonesia	0–3 (lost)	2012 AFC U-19 Championship qualification

=== U23 International goals ===
No	Date	Venue	Opponent	Score	Result	Competition
1	22 March 2015	Jurong West Sports and Recreation Centre, Singapore	Cambodia	1–0	2–2	International Friendly

As of September 2023

Singapore national team
Year	Apps	Goals
2014	1	0
2016	2	0
2018	3	0
2019	1	0
2023	1	0
Total	3	0

== Honours ==
LionsXII

- Malaysia Super League: 2013

Singapore

- Southeast Asian Games bronze medal: 2013
