= Ali Hudzafi =

Singaporean footballer

Personal information
- Full name: Ali Hudzafi Bin Mohd Yusof
- Date of birth: 23 March 1992 (age 34)
- Place of birth: Singapore
- Position: Defender

Team information
- Current team: Hougang United

Senior career*
Years	Team	Apps	(Gls)
2011–2012	Tampines Rovers	0	(0)
2013	LionsXII	0	(0)
2014–2015	Young Lions FC	0	(0)
2016–	Hougang United	0	(0)
- * Club domestic league appearances and goals as of 27 October 2011

Ali Hudzafi is a Singaporean football player. He plays currently for Hougang United in the S.League for 2017. Throughout his career, he has had two ACL injuries.

== Club career ==
=== Tampines Rovers ===
Ali started his career with the Stags in their prime league team.

=== LionsXII ===
In 2013, he was called up to the LionsXII to play in the Malaysia Super League. He make an appearance for the team against ATM FA as a last minute substitute.

=== Young Lions ===
After being released by the LionsXII, he move to the Young Lions to play in the Sleague which he played for 2 seasons. (2014–2015)

=== Hougang United ===
He joined Hougang United in 2016 but missed out on a majority of appearances in 2016 due to a long-term injury.

He was re-signed for 2017.
