= Anumanthan Kumar =

Singaporean footballer (born 1994)

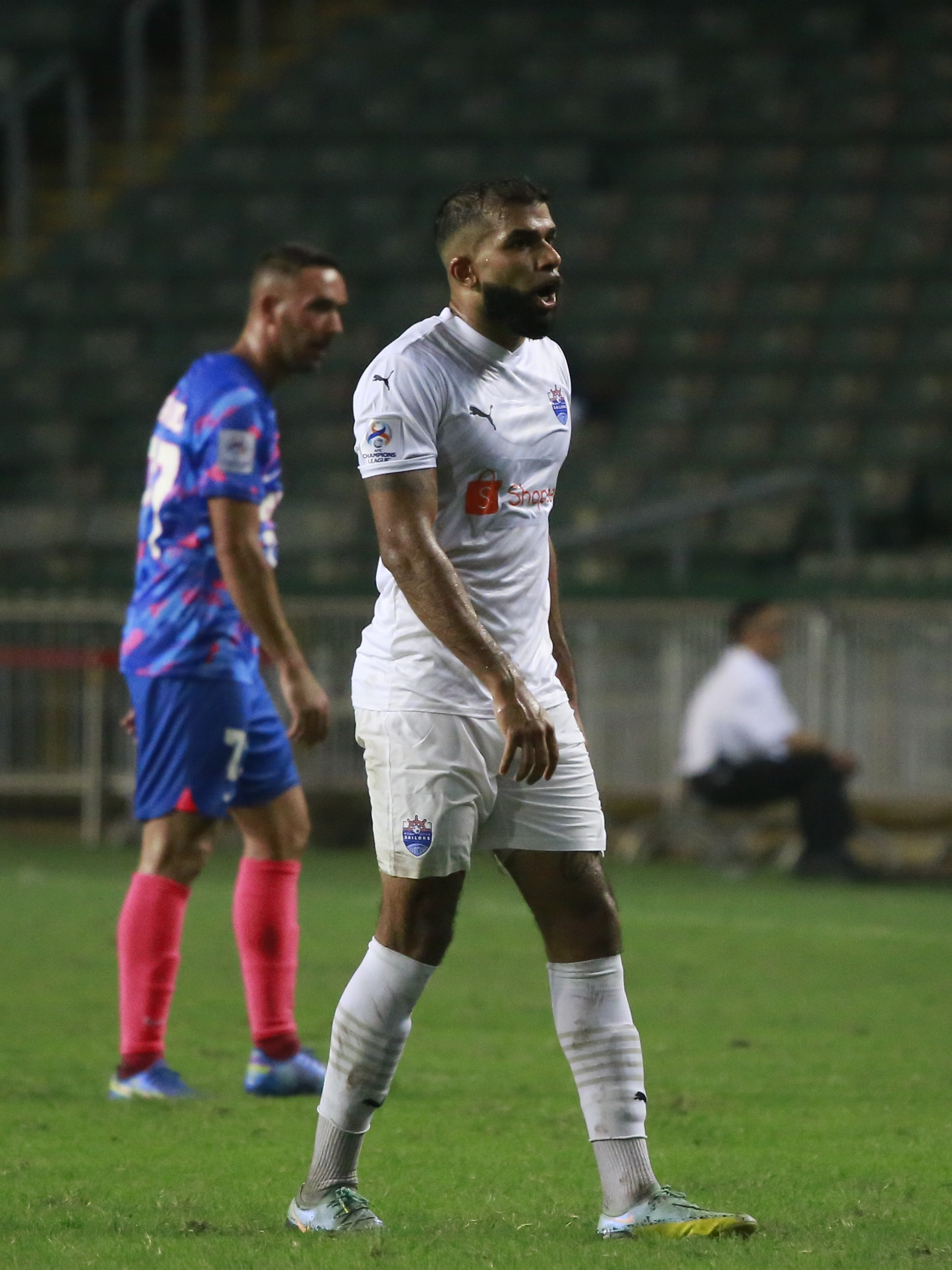
- Anu in action with Lion City Sailors during the 2023–24 AFC Champions League match.

Personal information
- Full name: Anumanthan Mohan Kumar
- Date of birth: 14 July 1994 (age 32)
- Place of birth: Singapore
- Height: 1.81 m (5 ft 11 1/2 in)
- Position: Defensive midfielder

Team information
- Current team: Kanchanaburi Power
- Number: 6

Youth career
- National Football Academy

Senior career*
| Years | Team | Apps | (Gls) |
| 2012–2015 | Young Lions | 63 | (2) |
| 2016–2017 | Hougang United | 27 | (0) |
| 2017–2018 | Home United | 24 | (2) |
| 2019–2020 | Hougang United | 23 | (1) |
| 2021 | Kedah Darul Aman | 21 | (1) |
| 2022–2025 | Lion City Sailors | 64 | (1) |
| 2025–2026 | Kanchanaburi Power | 10 | (0) |
| 2026- | Geylang International | 0 | (0) |

International career^{‡}
| 2013–2024 | Singapore | 41 | (0) |
Medal record
Men's football
Representing Singapore
Sea Games
| Bronze medal – third place | Naypyidaw 2013 | Football |
- * Club domestic league appearances and goals as of 11:21, 13 June 2025 (UTC) ‡ National team caps and goals as of 24 December 2022

Anumanthan Mohan Kumar (born 14 July 1994), nicknamed Anu, is a Singaporean professional footballer who plays as a defensive-midfielder for Singapore Premier League club Geylang International FC. Mainly a defensive-midfielder, Anu also been deployed as a central-midfielder and centre-back.

== Club career ==
=== Young Lions ===
Anumanthan began his professional football career with the Young Lions in 2012. With the team short on numbers, the National Football Academy trainee was called up to the squad. He played his first game in a 1–1 draw against Balestier Khalsa on 1 April 2012.

Anumanthan was one of five youth players shortlisted for the inaugural Dollah Kassim Award in 2010, which was eventually won by future Young Lions teammate Ammirul Emmran.

Anumanthan ended his Young Lions career on a high receiving offers from almost every club in the S.League vouching for his signature.

=== Hougang United ===
In January 2016, Anumanthan later went on to sign for Hougang United for the 2016 S.League campaign. In a stand-out breakthrough season, he won the 'Young Player of the Year' award and become the first Singaporean to win this award in 6 years after Hariss Harun won it in 2010.

Anumanthan was a vital member in the 2016 squad which almost made history by qualifying for their first ever AFC Cup, after a solid campaign for the club that year.

=== Home United ===
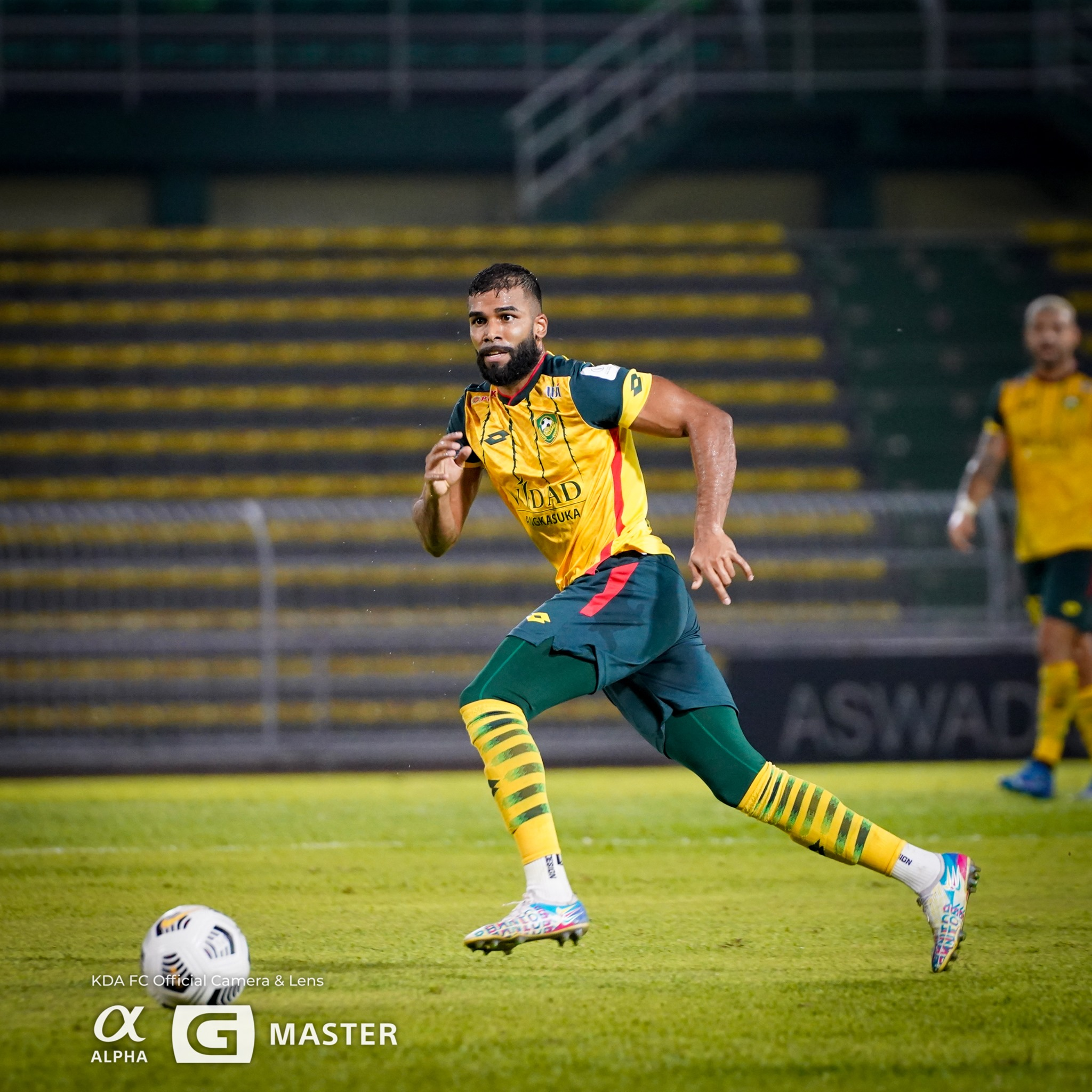
Anu playing for Kedah Darul Aman in 2021

Anumanthan signed for Home United in mid 2017 due to National Service commitments and featured his first game for the club against his former club Hougang United in October later that year. He went on to score his first goal for the club against rivals Warriors FC in a 2–1 lost. He ended the year by clinching 3rd placing in both the S.league and the Singapore Cup in 2017.

In 2018, Anumanthan went on to lead Home United to their first ever AFC Asian Cup Asean Zonal Championship title. He played a vital role in their successful campaign finishing 2nd in the Singapore Premier League.

=== Returned to Hougang United ===
After Anumanthan is done with his National Service commitments, in January 2019 he returned to his former club, Hougang United ahead for the 2019 Singapore Premier League season.

=== Kedah Darul Aman ===
On 18 January 2021, Anumanthan signed for Malaysia Super League club Kedah Darul Aman. On 13 August, Anumanthan scored his first goal for Kedah with a header against Selangor at the Darul Aman Stadium. Kedah went on to lose the match 2–4. He led Kedah to a 2nd place finish in the 2021 Malaysian Super League and finished the season with offers from other clubs.

=== Lions City Sailors ===
Anumanthan went on to sign a 3 year contract for Lion City Sailors in 2022. He helped his team to win the 2022 Singapore Community Shield that year and a Runner's-up finish to the league. Notably, he had put on a strong display of performance in the club's first match of the 2022 AFC Champions League to eventual champions, Urawa Red Diamonds. On 26 July 2023, Anu captained the Sailors against English giants, Tottenham Hotspurs in a friendly match at the Singapore National Stadium. On 9 December 2023, Anu guided the team to win the 2023 Singapore Cup.

Despite Maxime Lestienne's equaliser in the 91st minute of the 2025 AFC Champions League Two final against Sharjah, the Sailors finished as a runner-up after conceding in the 97th minute to finish the game in a 1–2 defeat.

On 10 June 2025, it was announced that Anumanthan would be leaving the club following the expiry of this contract.

=== Kanchanaburi Power ===
On 23 June 2025, it was announced that Anu would be joining newly promoted Thai League 1 side Kanchanaburi Power. He make his debut coming on as a substitution for Malaysian Sergio Agüero in a 3–3 draw to Bangkok United on 24 August.

== International career ==
Anumanthan was part of the Singapore national under-23 team that won the bronze medal at the 2013 Southeast Asian Games.

Anumanthan was called up to the senior team in July 2013. He made his senior debut for Singapore in a 2015 AFC Asian Cup qualifying match against Oman on 14 August 2013, coming on for striker Indra Shahdan Daud in the 70th minute. He followed it up with his first start in a friendly match against China on 6 September 2013.

In 2022, Anumanthan was included in the team for the 2022 FAS Tri-Nations Series and the 2022 AFF Championship.

== Style of play ==
Anu is a defensive midfielder known for his pace, physicality, aerial play, tackling, and work rate.

== Career statistics ==
=== Club ===
As of match played 7 Nov 2025

| Club | Season | League | | | National cup | | League cup | | Continental | | Other | | Total | |
| Club | Season | Division | Apps | Goals | Apps | Goals | Apps | Goals | Apps | Goals | Apps | Goals | Apps | Goals |
|---|---|---|---|---|---|---|---|---|---|---|---|---|---|---|
| Young Lions | 2012 | S.League | 4 | 0 | — | | — (Note: Young Lions withdrew from the 2012 Singapore League Cup due to participation in the 2013 AFC U-22 Championship qualifiers.) | | — | | — | | 4 | 0 |
| Young Lions | 2013 | S.League | 16 | 0 | 1 | 0 | 4 | 0 | — | | — | | 21 | 0 |
| Young Lions | 2014 | S.League | 23 | 1 | 0 | 0 | 0 | 0 | — | | — | | 23 | 1 |
| Young Lions | 2015 | S.League | 20 | 1 | 0 | 0 | 0 | 0 | — | | — | | 20 | 1 |
| Young Lions | Total | | 63 | 2 | 1 | 0 | 4 | 0 | 0 | 0 | 0 | 0 | 68 | 2 |
| Hougang United | 2016 | S.League | 22 | 0 | 1 | 0 | 0 | 0 | — | | — | | 23 | 0 |
| Hougang United | 2017 | S.League | 5 | 0 | 0 | 0 | 0 | 0 | — | | — | | 5 | 0 |
| Hougang United | Total | | 27 | 0 | 1 | 0 | 0 | 0 | 0 | 0 | 0 | 0 | 28 | 0 |
| Home United | 2017 | S.League | 6 | 1 | 1 | 0 | 0 | 0 | — | | — | | 7 | 1 |
| Home United | 2018 | S.League | 18 | 1 | 4 | 0 | 0 | 0 | 11 (Note: Appearance(s) in AFC Cup) | 2 | — | | 33 | 3 |
| Home United | Total | | 24 | 2 | 5 | 0 | 0 | 0 | 11 | 2 | 0 | 0 | 40 | 4 |
| Hougang United | 2019 | Singapore Premier League | 16 | 1 | 1 | 0 | 0 | 0 | — | | — | | 17 | 1 |
| Hougang United | 2020 | Singapore Premier League | 7 | 0 | 0 | 0 | 0 | 0 | 2 | 0 | — | | 9 | 0 |
| Hougang United | Total | | 23 | 1 | 1 | 0 | 0 | 0 | 2 | 0 | 0 | 0 | 26 | 1 |
| Kedah Darul Aman | 2021 | Malaysia Super League | 21 | 1 | 0 | 0 | 2 | 0 | 0 | 0 | — | | 23 | 1 |
| Lion City Sailors | 2022 | Singapore Premier League | 22 | 1 | 3 | 0 | 0 | 0 | 1 (Note: Appearance(s) in AFC Champions League Elite) | 0 | 1 | 0 | 27 | 1 |
| Lion City Sailors | 2023 | Singapore Premier League | 21 | 0 | 6 | 1 | 0 | 0 | 5 | 0 | — | | 32 | 1 |
| Lion City Sailors | 2024–25 | Singapore Premier League | 21 | 0 | 3 | 0 | 0 | 0 | 6 (Note: Appearance(s) in AFC Champions League Two) | 0 | 5 (Note: Four appearances in ASEAN Club Championship, one appearance in Singapore Community Shield) | 0 | 35 | 0 |
| Lion City Sailors | Total | | 64 | 1 | 12 | 1 | 0 | 0 | 12 | 0 | 6 | 0 | 94 | 2 |
| Kanchanaburi Power | 2025–26 | Thai League 1 | 5 | 0 | 0 | 0 | 0 | 0 | — | | — | | 5 | 0 |
| Geylang International | 2026–27 | Singapore Premier League | 0 | 0 | 0 | 0 | 0 | 0 | 0 | 0 | 0 | 0 | 0 | 0 |
| Geylang International | Total | | 0 | 0 | 0 | 0 | 0 | 0 | 0 | 0 | 0 | 0 | 0 | 0 |
| Career total | | | 227 | 7 | 20 | 1 | 6 | 0 | 25 | 2 | 6 | 0 | 284 | 10 |

- Young Lions are ineligible for qualification to AFC competitions.

=== International ===
==== U19 International caps ====
| No | Date | Venue | Opponent | Result | Competition |
|---|---|---|---|---|---|
| 1 | 31 October 2011 | Petaling Jaya Stadium, Selangor, Malaysia | Macau | 0-0 (draw) | 2012 AFC U-19 Championship qualification |
| 2 | 2 November 2011 | Petaling Jaya Stadium, Selangor, Malaysia | Australia | 0-1 (lost) | 2012 AFC U-19 Championship qualification |
| 3 | 4 November 2011 | Petaling Jaya Stadium, Selangor, Malaysia | China | 0-11 (lost) | 2012 AFC U-19 Championship qualification |
| 4 | 8 November 2011 | Petaling Jaya Stadium, Selangor, Malaysia | Indonesia | 0-3 (lost) | 2012 AFC U-19 Championship qualification |

As of December 2016

Singapore national team
| Year | Apps | Goals |
|---|---|---|
| 2013 | 3 | 0 |
| 2014 | 3 | 0 |
| 2016 | 6 | 0 |
| Total | 12 | 0 |

== Honours ==
=== Club ===
==== Kedah Darul Aman ====
- Malaysia Super League: Runners-up: 2021

Lion City Sailors

- AFC Champions League Two runner-up: 2024–25
- Singapore Premier League: 2024–25
- Singapore Cup: 2023, 2024–25
- Singapore Community Shield: 2022, 2024

=== International ===
Singapore

- Southeast Asian Games: bronze medal 2013

=== Individual ===
- S.League Young Player of the Year: 2016
