= Khairulhin Khalid =

Singaporean footballer (born 1991)

Personal information
- Full name: Muhammad Khairulhin bin Mohd Khalid
- Date of birth: 18 July 1991 (age 35)
- Place of birth: Singapore
- Height: 1.72 m (5 ft 7 1/2 in)
- Position: Goalkeeper

Team information
- Current team: Hougang United
- Number: 18

Senior career*
| Years | Team | Apps | (Gls) |
- Young Lions
| 2012–2015 | LionsXII | 2 | (0) |
| 2016– | Hougang United | 51 | (0) |

International career
- Singapore U23
| 2016– | Singapore | 0 | (0) |
Medal record
Men's football
Representing Singapore
Sea Games
| Bronze medal – third place | Sea Games 2013 | Football |
- * Club domestic league appearances and goals as of 26 February 2016

Muhammad Khairulhin bin Mohd Khalid (born 18 July 1991) is a Singaporean footballer who plays as a goalkeeper for Hougang United in the S.League.

== Youth career ==
Khairulhin was part of the National Youth Academy age group set ups until he was 18.

== Club career ==
=== LionsXII ===
In December 2011, the Football Association of Singapore announced that Khairulhin will join the newly formed LionsXII in the 2012 Malaysia Super League. The news was a shocking one as Khairulhin had been out of footballing circles for the past 3 years. He, however, failed to make a single appearance with first-choice Izwan Mahbud and back-up goalkeeper Hyrulnizam Juma'at ahead of him.

With the departure of Hyrulnizam to Warriors, Khairulhin assumed the role of second-choice custodian behind Izwan. He made his debut as a substitute against T-Team on 11 May 2013.

In total, Khairulhin made less than 10 appearances for LionsXII from 2012 to 2015.

=== Hougang United ===
Following the exit of the LionsXII from the Malaysia Super League, Khairulhin signed for Hougang United for the 2016 S.League season following the advice of former head coach and Singapore legend Fandi Ahmad. He started the season as the first choice goalkeeper for the Cheetahs, keeping 2 clean sheets in his first 3 games. After 12 games, Khairulhin had kept 4 clean sheets, more than any other local custodians in the league. He made 22 appearances in total over the entire season and was retained for the 2017 S.League season.

Khairulhin retained his position as starting goalkeeper for the Cheetahs, conceding only 16 goals in 14 S.League games.

== International career ==
Khairulhin was part of the Singapore national under-23 football team that won the bronze medal at the 2013 Southeast Asian Games.

=== Senior team ===
Following his exploits early on in the 2016 S.league season, Khairulhin was called up by national coach Bernd Stange for centralised training. Khairulhin was called up for the training tour in Japan and the friendly against Cambodia in 2016 by coach V. Sundramoorthy.

== Career statistics ==
=== Club ===
As of match played 5 Dec 2020

| Club | Season | S.League | | Singapore Cup | | Singapore League Cup | | Asia | | Total | |
| Club | Season | Apps | Goals | Apps | Goals | Apps | Goals | Apps | Goals | Apps | Goals |
|---|---|---|---|---|---|---|---|---|---|---|---|
| Young Lions | 2011 | - | - | — | | —| | | — | | 0 | 0 |
| Young Lions | Total | 0 | 0 | 0 | 0 | 0 | 0 | 0 | 0 | 0 | 0 |
| Club | Season | Malaysia Super League | | Malaysia FA Cup | | Malaysia Cup | | Asia | | Total | |
| LionsXII | 2012 | 0 | 0 | 0 | 0 | 0 | 0 | — | | 0 | 0 |
| LionsXII | 2013 | 2 | 0 | 0 | 0 | 0 | 0 | — | | 2 | 0 |
| LionsXII | 2014 | 0 | 0 | 0 | 0 | 0 | 0 | — | | 0 | 0 |
| LionsXII | 2015 | 0 | 0 | 0 | 0 | 0 | 0 | — | | 0 | 0 |
| LionsXII | Total | 2 | 0 | 0 | 0 | 0 | 0 | 0 | 0 | 2 | 0 |
| Club | Season | S.League | | Singapore Cup | | Singapore League Cup | | Asia | | Total | |
| Hougang United | 2016 | 12 | 0 | - | - | 0 | 0 | — | | 12 | 0 |
| Hougang United | 2017 | 14 | 0 | 1 | 0 | 0 | 0 | — | | 15 | 0 |
| Hougang United | 2018 | 16 | 0 | 0 | 0 | 0 | 0 | — | | 16 | 0 |
| Hougang United | 2019 | 5 | 0 | 2 | 0 | 0 | 0 | — | | 7 | 0 |
| Hougang United | 2020 | 3 | 0 | 0 | 0 | 1 | 0 | 3 | 0 | 7 | 0 |
| Hougang United | Total | 50 | 0 | 3 | 0 | 1 | 0 | 3 | 0 | 57 | 0 |
| Career Total | | 52 | 0 | 3 | 0 | 1 | 0 | 3 | 0 | 59 | 0 |

- Young Lions and LionsXII are ineligible for qualification to AFC competitions in their respective leagues.

== Honours ==
=== Club ===
LionsXII

- Malaysia Super League: 2013

=== International ===
Singapore

- Southeast Asian Games: Bronze Medal – 2013
