= 2021 Tanjong Pagar United FC season =

Tanjong Pagar United FC
2021 season
- Chairman: (Singapore) Raymond Tang
- Coach: (Singapore) Hasrin Jailani
- Ground: Jurong East Stadium
Home colours	Away colours

The 2021 season was Tanjong Pagar United FC's 16th season at the top level of Singapore football. The club also competed in the Singapore Cup.

== Squad ==
=== Singapore Premier League ===
As of 18 Dec 2020

No.	Name	Nationality	Date of birth (age)	Last club	Contract Since	Contract end
Goalkeepers
18	Fashah Iskandar	(Singapore)	15 February 1995 (age 31)	(Singapore) Warriors FC	2020	2021
23	Hariz Farid	(Singapore)	19 October 1997 (age 29)	(Singapore) Police SA (NFL)	2021	2021
28	Zharfan Rohaizad	(Singapore)	21 February 1997 (age 29)	(Singapore) Young Lions FC	2021	2021
Defenders
2	Faritz Abdul Hameed (Captain) ^{>30}	(Singapore)	16 January 1990 (age 36)	(Singapore) Home United	2020	2021
3	Shahrin Saberin	(Singapore)	14 February 1995 (age 31)	(Singapore) Geylang International	2021	2021
4	Delwinder Singh	(Singapore)	5 August 1992 (age 34)	(Singapore) Warriors FC	2020	2021
5	Emmeric Ong	(Singapore)	25 January 1991 (age 35)	(Singapore) Hougang United	2021	2021
7	Rusyaidi Salime ^{U23}	(Singapore)	25 April 1998 (age 28)	(Singapore) Young Lions FC	2021	2021
8	Prakash Raj ^{U23}	(Singapore)	11 June 1998 (age 28)	(Singapore) Hougang United U21	2021	2021
11	Shahib Masnawi ^{U23}	(Singapore)	4 August 2000 (age 26)	(Singapore) Young Lions FC	2021	2021
14	Julian Tan Jian Tang ^{U23}	(Singapore)	11 October 1999 (age 27)	Youth Team	2020	2021
26	Shakir Hamzah	(Singapore)	20 October 1992 (age 34)	(Malaysia) Perak F.C.	2021	2021
Midfielders
6	Ridhuan Muhammad ^{>30}	(Singapore)	6 May 1984 (age 42)	(Indonesia) Borneo F.C.	2021	2021
15	Shodai Nishikawa	(Japan)	21 September 1993 (age 33)	(Montenegro) OFK Petrovac	2020	2021
16	Raihan Rahman	(Singapore)	7 February 1991 (age 35)	(Singapore) Balestier Khalsa	2020	2021
17	Ammirul Emmran	(Singapore)	18 April 1995 (age 31)	(Singapore) Warriors FC	2020	2021
20	Blake Ricciuto	(Australia) (Uruguay) (Italy)	2 September 1992 (age 34)	(Spain) Vélez CF	2021	2021
21	Suhairi Sabri	(Singapore)	23 April 1996 (age 30)	(Singapore) Home United	2020	2021
22	Hadiputradila Saswadimata ^{U23}	(Singapore)	5 February 2000 (age 26)	(Singapore) Home United U19	2020	2021
Forwards
9	Reo Nishiguchi	(Japan)	21 August 1997 (age 29)	(Singapore) Albirex Niigata (S)	2021	2021
10	Luiz Júnior	(Brazil)	23 April 1990 (age 36)	(Malaysia) Sabah FA	2020	2021
12	Anaqi Ismit ^{U23}	(Singapore)	24 August 2001 (age 25)	(Singapore) Lion City Sailors FC	2021	2021
19	Khairul Amri ^{>30}	(Singapore)	14 March 1985 (age 41)	(Malaysia) FELDA United	2021	2021
25	Daniel Martens ^{U23}	(Singapore)	25 February 1999 (age 27)	(Singapore) Hougang United	2021	2021
Players loaned out / left during season
1	Joey Sim ^{>30}	(Singapore)	2 March 1987 (age 39)	(Singapore) Tiong Bahru FC (NFL)	2020	2021

== Coaching staff ==
Position	Name	Ref.
Chairman	(Singapore) Raymond Tang	
General manager	(Singapore) Desmund Khusnin	
Team manager	(Singapore) Noh Alam Shah	
Head coach	(Singapore) Hasrin Jailani	
Assistant coach	(Singapore) Herman Zailani	
Fitness Coach	(Singapore) Hafiz Osman	
Goalkeeping coach	(Singapore) Fajar Sarib	
Physiotherapist	(Singapore) Mukhlis Sawit	
Kitman	(Singapore) Azwan Hishamuddin	

== Transfers ==
=== In ===
Preseason

Position	Player	Transferred From	Ref
GK	(Singapore) Hariz Farid	(Singapore) Police SA (NFL D1)	
DF	(Singapore) Shahib Masnawi	(Singapore) Young Lions FC	Free
DF	(Singapore) Rusyaidi Salime	Free Agent	
DF	(Singapore) Emmeric Ong	(Singapore) Hougang United	Free
DF	(Singapore) Shahrin Saberin	(Singapore) Geylang International	Free
DF	(Singapore) Fathullah Rahmat	(Singapore) Tampines Rovers	Free
MF	(Singapore) Ridhuan Muhammad	Free Agent	Free
MF	(Singapore) Naufal Ilham	(Singapore) Lion City Sailors U21	Free
MF	(Australia) Blake Ricciuto	(Spain) Velez CF (Tier 4)	Free
FW	(Japan) Reo Nishiguchi	(Singapore) Albirex Niigata (S)	Free
FW	(Singapore) Daniel Martens	(Singapore) Hougang United	Free
FW	(Singapore) Khairul Amri	(Malaysia) FELDA United	Free

Mid-season

Position	Player	Transferred From	Ref
GK	(Singapore) Zharfan Rohaizad	(Singapore) Police SA	Free
DF	(Singapore) Prakash Raj	(Singapore) Hougang United U21	Free
DF	(Singapore) Shakir Hamzah	(Singapore) Tanjong Pagar United	Free

=== Loan In ===
Position	Player	Transferred From	Ref
FW	(Singapore) Anaqi Ismit	(Singapore) Lion City Sailors U21	Season loan

=== Out ===
Preseason

Position	Player	Transferred To	Ref
DF	(Brazil) Yann Motta	(Indonesia) Persija Jakarta	Free
DF	(Japan) Takahiro Tanaka	(Japan) FC Kariya (J4)	Free
DF	(Singapore) Syabil Hisham	(Singapore) Young Lions FC	Free
DF	(Singapore) Ariyan Shamsuddin	(Singapore)	
DF	(Singapore) Syariful Haq Sapari	(Singapore)	
MF	(Singapore) Ignatius Ang	(Singapore)	
MF	(Singapore) Ribiyanda Saswadimata	(Singapore)	
MF	(Singapore) Suria Prakash	(Singapore)	
FW	(Singapore) Nashrul Amin	(Singapore)	
FW	(Singapore) Zulkiffli Hassim	(Singapore)	

Mid-season

Position	Player	Transferred To	Ref
GK	(Singapore) Joey Sim	(Singapore)	Free

=== Loan Out ===
Preseason

Position	Player	Transferred To	Ref
GK	(Singapore) Kenji Syed Rusydi	(Singapore) SAFSA	NS till 2022
FW	(Singapore) Syahadat Masnawi	(Singapore) SAFSA	NS till 2022
FW	(Singapore) Syukri Bashir	(Singapore) SAFSA	NS till 2022

Preseason

Position	Player	Transferred To	Ref
MF	(Singapore) Efly Danish	(Singapore) SAFSA	NS till 2023

=== Extension / Retained ===
Position	Player	Ref
GK	(Singapore) Fashah Iskandar	
GK	(Singapore) Joey Sim	
DF	(Singapore) Delwinder Singh	
DF	(Singapore) Faritz Hameed	
MF	(Singapore) Raihan Rahman	
MF	(Singapore) Suhairi Sabri	
MF	(Singapore) Ammirul Emmran	
MF	(Singapore) Farihin Farkhan	
MF	(Japan) Shodai Nishikawa	
MF	(Singapore) Hadiputradila Saswadimata	
FW	(Brazil) Luiz Júnior	

=== Promoted ===
Position	Player	Ref
DF	(Singapore) Julian Tan Jian Tang	

== Friendlies ==
=== Pre-Season Friendly ===
Win Draw Loss

6 March 2021 1	Tanjong Pagar United (Singapore)	0–1	(Japan) Albirex Niigata (S)	Jurong East Stadium
		Report	Nicky Melvin Singh 15'	Attendance: 0 (Note: Due to Covid 19, this match is played behind closed door.)

=== Mid-season friendlies ===
Win Draw Loss

1 May 2021 1	Tanjong Pagar United (Singapore)	v	(Japan) Albirex Niigata (S)	Jurong East Stadium
				Attendance: 0 (Note: Due to the COVID-19 pandemic, this match was played behind closed doors.)

18 June 2021 2	Tanjong Pagar United (Singapore)	v	(Japan) Albirex Niigata (S)	Jurong East Stadium
				Attendance: 0

2 July 2021 3	Tanjong Pagar United (Singapore)	1–2	(Singapore) Balestier Khalsa	Jurong East Stadium
			Shuhei Hoshino	Attendance: 0

10 July 2021 4	Lion City Sailors (Singapore)	v	(Singapore) Tanjong Pagar United	Jalan Besar Stadium
				Attendance: 0

== Team statistics ==
=== Appearances and goals ===
As of 26 Sept 2021

Numbers in parentheses denote appearances as substitute.

No.	Pos.	Player	Sleague		Total	
No.	Pos.	Player	Apps.	Goals	Apps.	Goals
2	DF	(Singapore) Faritz Hameed	19	0	19	0
3	DF	(Singapore) Shahrin Saberin	17+1	0	18	0
4	DF	(Singapore) Delwinder Singh	11+1	0	12	0
5	DF	(Singapore) Emmeric Ong	4+2	0	6	0
6	MF	(Singapore) Ridhuan Muhammad	2+4	0	6	0
7	DF	(Singapore) Rusyaidi Salime	18	0	18	0
8	DF	(Singapore) Prakash Raj	2	0	2	0
9	FW	(Japan) Reo Nishiguchi	21	9	21	9
10	FW	(Brazil) Luiz Júnior	15+4	11	19	11
11	DF	(Singapore) Shahib Masnawi	1	0	1	0
12	FW	(Singapore) Anaqi Ismit	11+1	4	12	4
13	MF	(Singapore) Farihin Farkhan	0	0	0	0
14	DF	(Singapore) Julian Tan Jian Tang	0+1	0	1	0
15	MF	(Japan) Shodai Nishikawa	21	3	21	3
16	MF	(Singapore) Raihan Rahman	3+5	0	8	0
17	MF	(Singapore) Ammirul Emmran	2+8	0	10	0
18	GK	(Singapore) Fashah Iskandar	7	0	7	0
19	FW	(Singapore) Khairul Amri	4+14	5	18	5
20	MF	(Australia) (Italy) (Uruguay) Blake Ricciuto	20	2	20	2
21	MF	(Singapore) Suhairi Sabri	0+6	0	6	0
22	MF	(Singapore) Hadiputradila Saswadimata	3+1	0	4	0
25	FW	(Singapore) Daniel Martens	7	0	7	0
26	DF	(Singapore) Shakir Hamzah	9	1	9	1
28	GK	(Singapore) Zharfan Rohaizad	13	0	13	0
51	DF	(Singapore) Fathullah Rahmat	11	1	11	1
54	MF	(Singapore) Naufal Ilham	9+1	0	10	0
56	MF	(Singapore) Efly Danish	0+2	0	2	0
Players who have played this season but had left the club or on loan to other club
1	GK	(Singapore) Joey Sim	1	0	1	0

== Competitions ==
=== Overview ===
Competition	Record							
Competition	P	W	D	L	GF	GA	GD	Win %

=== Singapore Premier League ===
Win Draw Loss

14 March 2021 1	Geylang International (Singapore)	2–1	(Singapore) Tanjong Pagar United	Our Tampines Hub
	Matheus Moresche 18' (pen.) 74'; Amy Recha (yellow card) 49'	Report	Blake Ricciuto 21' (yellow card) 41'; Delwinder Singh (yellow card) 38'; Luiz Júnior (yellow card) 39'; Ammirul Emmran (yellow card) 62'	Attendance: 0 Referee: Lim Liang Yi

17 March 2021 2	Tanjong Pagar United (Singapore)	0–5	(Singapore) Lion City Sailors	Jurong East Stadium
		Report	Stipe Plazibat 47' (pen.) 59'; Song Ui-young 54' 70' (yellow card) 21'; Faris Ramli 84' (pen.)	Attendance: 0 Referee: Zulfiqar Mustaffa

21 March 2021 3	Tampines Rovers (Singapore)	3–1	(Singapore) Tanjong Pagar United	Our Tampines Hub
	Madhu Mohana 5'; Yasir Hanapi 61'; Taufik Suparno 85'; Irwan Shah (yellow card) 69'; Irfan Najeeb (yellow card) 71'		Luiz Júnior 80' (pen.); Fashah Iskandar (yellow card) 33'; Rusyaidi Salime (yellow card) 59'	Attendance: 0 Referee: Ahmad A'qashah

4 April 2021 4	Balestier Khalsa (Singapore)	4–0	(Singapore) Tanjong Pagar United	Toa Payoh Stadium
	Faizal Raffi 24'; Kristijan Krajcek 41' 89'; Šime Žužul 55'; Fadli Kamis (yellow card) 51'	Report	Khairul Amri (yellow card) 67'; Faritz Abdul Hameed (yellow card) 90'	Attendance: 0 Referee: Muhammad Taqi

7 April 2021 5	Tanjong Pagar United (Singapore)	3–3	(Singapore) Hougang United	Jurong East Stadium
	Shodai Nishikawa 6'; Luiz Júnior 60'; Reo Nishiguchi 84'; Shahrin Saberin (yellow card) 31'; Fashah Iskandar (yellow card) 36'; Naufal Ilham (yellow card) 54'; Ammirul Emmran (yellow card) 74'	Report	Idraki Adnan 27'; Tomoyuki Doi 61' 90+6'; Farhan Zulkifli (yellow card) 16'; Maksat Dzhakybaliev (yellow card) 39'; Fabian Kwok (yellow card) 80'; Anders Aplin (yellow card) 86'	Attendance: 0 Referee: Syarqawi Buhari

10 April 2021 6	Young Lions FC (Singapore)	0–4	(Singapore) Tanjong Pagar United	Jalan Besar Stadium
	Hami Syahin (yellow card) 24'; Amir Syafiz (yellow card) 73'	Report	Reo Nishiguchi 5'; Luiz Júnior 61' 63'; Blake Ricciuto 66'; Daniel Martens (yellow card) 31'; Emmeric Ong (yellow card) 36'; Suhairi Sabri (yellow card) 90+2'	Attendance: 0 Referee: Jansen Foo

17 April 2021 7	Tanjong Pagar United (Singapore)	0–6	(Japan) Albirex Niigata (S)	Jurong East Stadium
	Blake Ricciuto (yellow card) 23'; Shahrin Saberin (yellow card) 44'; Ammirul Emmran (yellow card) 45'; Faritz Hameed (yellow card) 70'	Report	Kiyoshiro Tsuboi 32' 37' 41'; Kuraba Kondo 62' 88'; Ryoya Tanigushi 68'; Shuya Yamashita (yellow card) 80'	Attendance: 0 Referee: Abirami Naidu

17 July 2021 8 (Rescheduled)	Tanjong Pagar United (Singapore)	1–1	(Japan) Young Lions FC	Jurong East Stadium
	Luiz Júnior 65'	Report	Hami Syahin 21' (pen.); Jacob Mahler (yellow card) 87'; Zulqarnaen Suzliman (yellow card) 90+3'	Attendance: 227; Referee: Ahmad A'qashah

16 May 2021 9	Lion City Sailors (Singapore)	3–1	(Singapore) Tanjong Pagar United	Jalan Besar Stadium
	Jorge Fellipe 55'; Gabriel Quak 59'; Diego Lopes 80'; Saifullah Akbar (yellow card) 31'; Amirul Adli (yellow card) 84'	Report	Shodai Nishikawa 47'; Daniel Martens (yellow card) 37'; Suhairi Sabri (yellow card) 67'	Attendance: 0 Referee: Abirami Naidu

24 April 2021 10 (Rescheduled)	Tanjong Pagar United (Singapore)	2–2	(Singapore) Tampines Rovers	Jurong East Stadium
	Reo Nishiguchi 21' (yellow card) 86'; Luiz Júnior 60' (pen.); Anaqi Ismit (yellow card) 37'; Suhairi Sabri (yellow card) 78'; Rusyaidi Salime (yellow card) 78'; Fashah Iskandar (yellow card) 88'	Report	Armin Bosnjak 38'; Daniel Bennett 45+4'; Madhu Mohana (yellow card) 52'; Taufik Suparno (yellow card) 89'	Attendance: 250; Referee: Juherman Zaiton

23 May 2021 11	Tanjong Pagar United (Singapore)	2–2	(Singapore) Balestier Khalsa	Jurong East Stadium
	Šime Žužul 61' 87'	Report	Reo Nishiguchi 32'; Khairul Amri 85' (pen.); Anaqi Ismit (yellow card) 77'; Raihan Rahman (yellow card) 81'	Attendance: 0 Referee: Juherman Zaiton

24 July 2021 12 (Rescheduled)	Hougang United (Singapore)	1–4	(Singapore) Tanjong Pagar United	Hougang Stadium
	Tomoyuki Doi 62'; Gilberto Fortunato (yellow card) 63'; Rusyaidi Salime (yellow card) 76'	Report	Anaqi Ismit 48'; Luiz Júnior 67'; Reo Nishiguchi 88'; Khairul Amri 90+4'	Referee: Jansen Foo

1 August 2021 13 (Rescheduled)	Tanjong Pagar United (Singapore)	1–3	(Singapore) Geylang International	Jurong East Stadium
	Luiz Júnior 62' (yellow card) 78'; Shakir Hamzah (yellow card) 8'; Fathullah Rahmat (yellow card) 47'	Report	Ilhan Noor 14' 38'; Shakir Hamzah 35' (o.g.); Afiq Yunos (yellow card) 18'; Faizal Roslan (yellow card) 68'; Izzdin Shafiq (yellow card) 78'; Yuki Ichikawa (yellow card) 78'	Referee: Farhad Mohamed

6 August 2021 14 (Rescheduled)	Albirex Niigata (S) (Japan)	1–2	(Singapore) Tanjong Pagar United	Jurong East Stadium
	Shuya Yamashita 80'	Report	Reo Nishiguchi 34'; Luiz Júnior 84'; Anaqi Ismit (yellow card) 50'	Referee: Taufik Thana

14 August 2021 15 (Rescheduled)	Geylang International (Singapore)	2–4	(Singapore) Tanjong Pagar United	Our Tampines Hub
	Anaqi Ismit 15' (o.g.); Amy Recha 18'; Harith Kanadi (yellow card) 45'; Abdil Qaiyyim Mutalib (yellow card) 90+4'	Report	Shodai Nishikawa 43'; Reo Nishiguchi 49'; Khairul Amri 78' 90'; Faritz Abdul Hameed (yellow card) 42'; Shakir Hamzah (yellow card) 56'; Blake Ricciuto (yellow card) 70'	Referee: Y Sathyakumar

20 August 2021 16 (Rescheduled)	Tanjong Pagar United (Singapore)	1–2	(Singapore) Lion City Sailors	Jurong East Stadium
	Luiz Júnior 77'; Rusyaidi Salime (yellow card) 52'; Shakir Hamzah (yellow card) 57'; Ammirul Emmran (yellow card) 90+2'	Report	Haiqal Pashia 42'; Jorge Fellipe 53'; Faris Ramli (yellow card) 70'; Hassan Sunny (yellow card) 82'	Referee: Ahmad A'qashah

29 August 2021 17 (Rescheduled)	Tampines Rovers (Singapore)	2–2	(Singapore) Tanjong Pagar United	Our Tampines Hub
	Irfan Najeeb 17'; Marc Ryan Tan 35'; Irwan Shah (yellow card) 73' (yellow-red card) 90+3'	Report	Shakir Hamzah 29'; Anaqi Ismit 45'; Khairul Amri (yellow card) 70'; Rusyaidi Salime (yellow card) 89'; Shahrin Saberin (yellow card) 90+4'	Referee: Jansen Foo

12 September 2021 18 (Rescheduled)	Balestier Khalsa (Singapore)	1–0	(Singapore) Tanjong Pagar United	Toa Payoh Stadium
	Hazzuwan Halim 47'; Puvan Raj (yellow card) 55'; Ahmad Syahir (yellow card) 62'; Ho Wai Loon (yellow card) 65'	Report	Blake Ricciuto (yellow card) 71'; Rusyaidi Salime (yellow card) 90+7'	Referee: Taufik Thana

18 September 2021 19 (Rescheduled)	Tanjong Pagar United (Singapore)	1–1	(Singapore) Hougang United	Jurong East Stadium
	Khairul Amri 53'; Raihan Rahman (yellow card) 70'; Faritz Hameed (yellow card) 85'	Report	Gilberto Fortunato 8'; Fabian Kwok (yellow card) 21'	Referee: Shadiq Al-Hussain

26 September 2021 20 (Rescheduled)	Young Lions FC (Singapore)	1–2	(Singapore) Tanjong Pagar United	Jalan Besar Stadium
	Glenn Kweh 23'; Joel Chew (yellow card) 45+1'; Ridhwan Fikri (yellow card) 45+1'; Syahrul Sazali (yellow card) 67'; Ryhan Stewart (yellow card) 85'	Report	Reo Nishiguchi 5'; Luiz Júnior 67' (pen.); Rusyaidi Salime (yellow card) 45+1'; Raihan Rahman (yellow card) 45+1'	Referee: Leow Hong Wei Clarence

10 October 2021 21 (Rescheduled)	Tanjong Pagar United (Singapore)	4–4	(Japan) Albirex Niigata (S)	Jurong East Stadium
	Anaqi Ismit 12' 73'; Fathullah Rahmat 59' (yellow card) 63'; Reo Nishiguchi 87'; Shakir Hamzah (yellow card) 20'; Shahrin Saberin (yellow card) 23'	Report	Kiyoshiro Tsuboi 20' 23' (pen.) 44' 45+2'	Referee: Jansen Foo

Pos	Team	Pld	W	D	L	GF	GA	GD	Pts	Qualification or relegation
3	Hougang United	21	10	4	7	48	40	+8	34	Qualification for AFC Cup group stage
4	Tampines Rovers	21	7	6	8	48	51	−3	27	Qualification for AFC Cup group stage
5	Tanjong Pagar United	21	5	7	9	36	49	−13	22	
6	Geylang International	21	6	2	13	33	52	−19	20	
7	Balestier Khalsa	21	5	4	12	34	52	−18	19	

Updated to match(es) played on 3 April 2021. Source: Singapore Premier League
Rules for classification: 1) points; 2) goal difference; 3) number of goals scored; 4) number of wins
