= 2020 Tanjong Pagar United FC season =

Tanjong Pagar United FC
2020 season
- Chairman: (Singapore) Raymond Tang
- Coach: (Singapore) Hasrin Jailani
- Ground: Jurong East Stadium
Home colours

The 2020 Singapore Premier League season was Tanjong Pagar United's 15th season at the top level of Singapore football. The club also competed in the Singapore Cup.

It was first reported that the Jaguar was applying to play for the 2020 season after the announcement of Warrior's plight. On 19 January 2020, FAS confirmed that the club "met all the necessary pre-requisites for participation in the SPL 2020 season." They played their matches in the Jurong East Stadium, sharing with Albirex Niigata (S).

== Squad ==
=== Sleague Squad ===
As of 25 Jan 2020

No.	Name	Nationality	Date of Birth (Age)	Last club	Contract Since	Contract End
Goalkeepers
1	Joey Sim ^{>30}	(Singapore)	2 March 1987 (age 39)	(Singapore) Tiong Bahru FC (NFL)	2020	2020
18	Fashah Iskandar	(Singapore)	15 February 1995 (age 31)	(Singapore) Warriors FC	2020	2020
23	Kenji Syed Rusydi ^{U23}	(Singapore)	12 July 1998 (age 28)	(Singapore) Young Lions FC	2020	2020
Defenders
2	Faritz Abdul Hameed ^{>30}	(Singapore)	16 January 1990 (age 36)	(Singapore) Home United	2020	
4	Delwinder Singh	(Singapore)	5 August 1992 (age 34)	(Singapore) Warriors FC	2020	2020
5	Yann Motta	(Brazil)	24 November 1999 (age 26)	(Brazil) Sampaio Corrêa FC	2020	
6	Syabil Hisham ^{U23}	(Singapore)	20 September 2002 (age 24)	(Singapore) Geylang International U19	2020	
7	Takahiro Tanaka	(Japan)	22 November 1993 (age 32)	(Japan) Renofa Yamaguchi FC	2020	
12	Syariful Haq Sapari ^{U23}	(Singapore)	22 July 2001 (age 25)	Free agent	2020	
25	Ariyan Shamsuddin ^{U23}	(Singapore)	28 August 1997 (age 29)	(Singapore) SAFSA	2020	
55	Julian Tan Jian Tang ^{U23}	(Singapore)	11 October 1999 (age 27)		2020	
Midfielders
11	Ignatius Ang	(Singapore)	12 November 1992 (age 34)	(Singapore) Warriors FC	2020	
13	Farihin Farkhan ^{U23}	(Singapore)	26 April 1998 (age 28)	Free agent	2020	
14	Hadiputradila Saswadimata ^{U23}	(Singapore)	5 February 2000 (age 26)	(Singapore) Home United U19	2020	
15	Shodai Nishikawa	(Japan)	21 September 1993 (age 33)	(Montenegro) OFK Petrovac	2020	
16	Raihan Rahman	(Singapore)	7 February 1991 (age 35)	(Singapore) Balestier Khalsa	2020	
17	Suria Prakash	(Singapore)	23 December 1993 (age 32)	(Singapore) Warriors FC	2020	2020
19	Ribiyanda Saswadimata ^{U23}	(Singapore)	5 February 1997 (age 29)	(Singapore) Yishun Sentek Mariners FC (NFL)	2020	
21	Suhairi Sabri	(Singapore)	23 April 1996 (age 30)	(Singapore) Home United	2020	2020
28	Ammirul Emmran	(Singapore)	18 April 1995 (age 31)	(Singapore) Warriors FC	2020	2020
57	Efly Danish ^{U23}	(Singapore)	15 October 2002 (age 24)		2020	
Forwards
3	Syukri Bashir ^{U23}	(Singapore)	11 April 1998 (age 28)	(Singapore) Young Lions FC	2020	
8	Nashrul Amin ^{U23}	(Singapore)	17 June 1997 (age 29)	(Singapore) GFA Victoria FC (NFL)	2020	2020
10	Luiz Júnior	(Brazil)	23 April 1990 (age 36)	(Malaysia) Sabah FA	2020	
24	Zulkiffli Hassim	(Singapore)	26 March 1986 (age 40)	(Singapore) Warriors FC	2020	2020
60	Indera Iskandar ^{U23}	(Singapore)	2 April 2003 (age 23)		2020	
Players loaned out / left during season
9	Syahadat Masnawi ^{U23}	(Singapore)	7 November 2001 (age 25)	(Singapore) Young Lions FC	2020	

== Coaching staff ==
Position	Name	Ref.
Chairman	(Singapore) Raymond Tang	
General Manager	(Singapore) Desmund Khusnin	
Team Manager	(Singapore) Noh Alam Shah	
Head coach	(Singapore) Hari Su'ap	
Assistant coach	(Singapore) Hasrin Jailani	
Fitness coach	(Singapore) Hafiz Osman	
Goalkeeping coach	(Singapore) Rizal Abdul Rahman	
Physiotherapist	(Singapore) Abdul Hamid Bin Omar	

== Transfers ==
=== Pre-season transfers ===
==== In ====
Position	Player	Transferred From	Ref
GK	(Singapore) Fashah Iskandar	(Singapore) Warriors FC	
GK	(Singapore) Kenji Syed Rusydi	(Singapore) Home United	
GK	(Singapore) Joey Sim	(Singapore) Tiong Bahru FC	
DF	(Singapore) Faritz Abdul Hameed	(Singapore) Home United	Free
DF	(Japan) Takahiro Tanaka	(Japan) Renofa Yamaguchi FC	Free
DF	(Singapore) Delwinder Singh	(Singapore) Warriors FC	
DF	(Singapore) Ribiyanda Saswadimata	(Singapore) Yishun Sentek Mariners FC	
DF	(Singapore) Hadiputradila Saswadimata	(Singapore) Home United U19	
DF	(Brazil) Yann Motta	(Brazil) Sampaio Corrêa FC	
MF	(Singapore) Suria Prakash	(Singapore) Warriors FC	
MF	(Singapore) Ignatius Ang	(Singapore) Warriors FC	
MF	(Singapore) Suhairi Sabri	(Singapore) Home United	
MF	(Singapore) Raihan Rahman	(Singapore) Balestier Khalsa	Free
MF	(Japan) Shodai Nishikawa		Free
FW	(Brazil) Luiz Júnior	(Malaysia) Sabah FA	
FW	(Singapore) Syukri Bashir	(Singapore) Hougang United	Free
FW	(Singapore) Nashrul Amin	(Singapore) GFA Victoria FC	Free
FW	(Singapore) Syahadat Masnawi	(Singapore) Young Lions FC	

==== Out ====
Position	Player	Transferred To	Ref

=== Mid Season ===
==== In ====
Position	Player	Transferred From	Ref
FW	(Singapore) Zulkiffli Hassim	(Singapore) Warriors FC	
DF	(Singapore) Ariyan Shamsuddin	(Singapore) SAFSA (NFL D1)	Free
MF	(Singapore) Ammirul Emmran	(Singapore) Warriors FC	

==== Out ====
Position	Player	Transferred To	Ref
FW	(Singapore) Syahadat Masnawi	(Singapore) SAFSA	NS

== Friendlies ==
=== Pre-Season Friendly ===
Win Draw Loss

2 February 2019 1	Tanjong Pagar United (Singapore)	9–0	(Singapore) Siglap FC	Jalan Besar Stadium

8 February 2020 2	Tanjong Pagar United (Singapore)	4–0	(Singapore) Geylang International	Jurong West Stadium

15 February 2020 3	Johor Darul Ta'zim F.C. II (Malaysia)	4–0	(Singapore) Tanjong Pagar United	Johor, Malaysia
	Kei Hirose 6'; Nicolás Alberto Fernández 28' (pen.) 55'; Rozaimi Abdul Rahman 86'			Stadium: Larkin Stadium

19 February 2020 4	Young Lions FC (Singapore)	1–1	(Singapore) Tanjong Pagar United	Jalan Besar Stadium
	Rezza Rezky		Luiz Júnior

23 February 2020 5	Albirex Niigata (S) (Singapore)	6–0	(Singapore) Tanjong Pagar United	Jurong East Stadium
	Doi Tomoyuki (pen.); Ryoya Tanigushi; Ryuya Mitsuzuka (pen.)

== Team statistics ==
=== Appearances and goals ===
As of 20 March 2020

Numbers in parentheses denote appearances as substitute.

No.	Pos.	Player	Sleague		Singapore Cup		Total	
No.	Pos.	Player	Apps.	Goals	Apps.	Goals	Apps.	Goals
1	GK	(Singapore) Joey Sim	0(1)	0	0	0	1	0
2	DF	(Singapore) Faritz Abdul Hameed	9(2)	0	0	0	11	0
4	DF	(Singapore) Delwinder Singh	9	0	0	0	9	0
5	DF	(Brazil) Yann Motta	13(1)	2	0	0	14	2
6	DF	(Singapore) Syabil Hisham	10(2)	0	0	0	12	0
7	DF	(Japan) Takahiro Tanaka	13(1)	0	0	0	14	0
8	FW	(Singapore) Nashrul Amin	11	0	0	0	11	0
10	FW	(Brazil) Luiz Júnior	8(6)	7	0	0	14	7
11	MF	(Singapore) Ignatius Ang	4(1)	0	0	0	5	0
13	MF	(Singapore) Farihin Farkhan	3(5)	1	0	0	8	1
14	MF	(Singapore) Hadiputradila Saswadimata	4(3)	0	0	0	7	0
15	MF	(Japan) Shodai Nishikawa	13	2	0	0	13	2
16	MF	(Singapore) Raihan Rahman	10(1)	0	0	0	11	0
17	MF	(Singapore) Suria Prakash	3(11)	1	0	0	14	1
18	GK	(Singapore) Fashah Iskandar	4	0	0	0	4	0
19	MF	(Singapore) Ribiyanda Saswadimata	1(1)	0	0	0	2	0
21	MF	(Singapore) Suhairi Sabri	11(1)	1	0	0	12	1
23	GK	(Singapore) Kenji Syed Rusydi	10	0	0	0	10	0
24	FW	(Singapore) Zulkiffli Hassim	3(5)	0	0	0	8	0
28	MF	(Singapore) Ammirul Emmran	9(2)	0	0	0	11	0
55	MF	(Singapore) Julian Tan Jian Tang	1	0	0	0	1	0
57	MF	(Singapore) Efly Danish	2	0	0	0	2	0
60	FW	(Singapore) Indera Iskandar	0(2)	0	0	0	2	0
Players who have played this season but had left the club or on loan to other club
9	FW	(Singapore) Syahadat Masnawi	3	0	0	0	3	0

== Competitions ==
=== Overview ===
Competition	Record							
Competition	P	W	D	L	GF	GA	GD	Win %

=== Singapore Premier League ===
Win Draw Loss

6 March 2020 1	Tanjong Pagar United (Singapore)	1–1	(Singapore) Lion City Sailors F.C.	Jurong East Stadium
	Yann Motta 26'; Shodai Nishikawa (yellow card) 20'; Syahadat Masnawi (yellow card) 47'; Takahiro Tanaka (yellow card) 56'; Faritz Abdul Hameed (yellow card) 86'	Report	Andy Pengelly 45'; Hafiz Nor (yellow card) 59'; Kaishu Yamazaki (yellow card) 77'	Attendance: 2,723; Referee: Lim Liang Yi; Man of the Match: (Singapore) Kenji Syed Rusydi

14 March 2020 2 (Rescheduled)	Tampines Rovers (Singapore)	2–0	(Singapore) Tanjong Pagar United	Our Tampines Hub
	Jordan Webb 12' 74'; Huzaifah Aziz (yellow card) 42'	Report	Syabil Hisham (yellow card) 29'; Nashrul Amin (yellow card) 57'; Delwinder Singh (yellow card) 61'; Ignatius Ang (yellow card) 79'; Luiz Júnior (yellow card) 84'; Yann Motta (yellow card) 85'	Attendance: 0 (Note: Due to Covid 19, this match is played behind closed door.); Referee: Muhammad Zulfiqar; Man of the Match: (Canada) Jordan Webb

20 March 2020 3 (Rescheduled)	Tanjong Pagar United (Singapore)	2–2	(Singapore) Albirex Niigata (S)	Jurong East Stadium
	Shodai Nishikawa 17'; Yann Motta 80' (yellow card) 62'; Syahadat Masnawi (yellow card) 22'; Delwinder Singh (red card) 44'	Report	Reo Nishiguchi 58'; Tomoyuki Doi 86'; Yasuhiro Hanada (yellow card) 76'	Attendance: 0 Referee: Ahmad A'Qashah; Man of the Match: (Singapore) Fashah Iskandar

17 October 2020 4 (Rescheduled) (Note: The match is postponed following the coronavirus pandemic.)	Tanjong Pagar United (Singapore)	0–1	(Singapore) Balestier Khalsa	Jurong East Stadium
	Faritz Abdul Hameed (yellow card) 86'	Report	Ensar Brunčević 50'; Elijah Lim Teck Yong (yellow card) 45+3'; Ahmad Syahir (yellow card) 81'; Zaiful Nizam (yellow card) 85'	Attendance: 0 Referee: Muhammad Zulfiqar; Man of the Match: (Serbia) Ensar Brunčević

25 October 2020 5 (Rescheduled)	Young Lions FC (Singapore)	2–1	(Singapore) Tanjong Pagar United	Jurong West Stadium
	Jacob Mahler 54' (yellow card) 77'; Shahrulnizam Mazlan 68'; Amirul Haikal (yellow card) 59'; Nur Adam Abdullah (yellow card) 76'; Sahffee Jubpre (yellow card) 90'; Irfan Najeeb (yellow card) 90+2'	Report	Luiz Júnior 74'; Syabil Hisham (yellow card) 56'	Attendance: 0 Referee: Syarqawi Buhari; Man of the Match: (Singapore) Jacob Mahler

1 November 2020 6 (Rescheduled)	Tanjong Pagar United (Singapore)	0–0	(Singapore) Hougang United	Bishan Stadium
	Syabil Hisham (yellow card) 16'; Raihan Rahman (yellow card) 30'; Suhairi Sabri (yellow card) 30'; Nashrul Amin (yellow card) 45+3'; Kenji Syed Rusydi (yellow card) 77'	Report	Muhaimin Suhaimi (yellow card) 44'; Charlie Machell (yellow card) 45+2'; Lionel Tan (yellow card) 62'; Afiq Noor (yellow card) 72'	Attendance: 0 Referee: Y. Sathyakumar; Man of the Match: (Singapore) Delwinder Singh

4 November 2020 7 (Rescheduled)	Tanjong Pagar United (Singapore)	0–3	(Singapore) Geylang International	Jurong East Stadium
	Raihan Rahman (yellow card) 44'	Report	Khairul Nizam 61'	Attendance: 0 Referee: Muhammad Taqi; Man of the Match: (Singapore) Khairul Nizam

13 November 2020 8 (Rescheduled)	Lion City Sailors (Singapore)	6–1	(Singapore) Tanjong Pagar United	Bishan Stadium
	Kaishu Yamazaki 14'; Stipe Plazibat 19' (pen.) 45+2'; Song Ui-young 40'; Adam Swandi 84' 90'; Tajeli Salamat (yellow card) 34'; Abdil Qaiyyim Mutalib (yellow card) 77'	Report	Suhairi Sabri 51'; Suria Prakash (yellow card) 85'	Attendance: 0 Referee: Syarqawi Buhari; Man of the Match: (Singapore) Shahdan Sulaiman

17 November 2020 9 (Rescheduled)	Geylang International (Singapore)	2–1	(Singapore) Tanjong Pagar United	Our Tampines Hub
	Shahrin Saberin 23'; Fareez Farhan 69'; Harith Kanadi (yellow card) 90'	Report	Luiz Júnior 80'; Takahiro Tanaka (yellow card) 12'	Attendance: 0 Referee: Juherman Zaiton; Man of the Match: (Netherlands) Barry Maguire

22 November 2020 10 (Rescheduled)	Tanjong Pagar United (Singapore)	2–2	(Singapore) Tampines Rovers	Jurong East Stadium
	Luiz Júnior 61' 81'; Raihan Rahman (yellow card) 8'; Faritz Abdul Hameed (yellow card) 18'; Delwinder Singh (yellow card) 90+2'	Report	Boris Kopitović 5' 75'; Jordan Webb (red card) 37'; Kyoga Nakamura (yellow card) 62'; Taufik Suparno (yellow card) 78'	Attendance: 0 Referee: Taufik Thana; Man of the Match: (Brazil) Luiz Júnior

25 November 2020 11 (Rescheduled)	Balestier Khalsa (Singapore)	2–2	(Singapore) Tanjong Pagar United	Bishan Stadium
	Danish Uwais 22'; Shuhei Hoshino 32'; C. Aarish Kumar (yellow card) 50'	Report	Luiz Júnior 26'; Shodai Nishikawa 35'	Attendance: 0 Referee: Ahmad A'Qashah; Man of the Match: (Brazil) Luiz Júnior

28 November 2020 12 (Rescheduled)	Hougang United (Singapore)	3–2	(Singapore) Tanjong Pagar United	Hougang Stadium
	Anders Aplin 52'; Shawal Anuar 24' (pen.); Shahfiq Ghani 87'; Nikesh Singh (yellow card) 18'; Hafiz Sujad (yellow card) 42'; Fabian Kwok (yellow card) 54'	Report	Farihin Farkhan 22'; Suria Prakash 65'; Yann Motta (yellow card) 20'; Shodai Nishikawa (yellow card) 37'	Attendance: 0 Referee: Farhan Mohd; Man of the Match: (Singapore) Shawal Anuar

2 December 2020 13 (Rescheduled)	Albirex Niigata (S) (Singapore)	3–0	(Singapore) Tanjong Pagar United	Jurong East Stadium
	Tomoyuki Doi 48' (pen.) 90+3'; Kotaro Takeda 89'; Ryuya Mitsuzuka (yellow card) 74'	Report		Attendance: 0 Referee: Muhammad Zulfiqar; Man of the Match: (Japan) Tomoyuki Doi

5 December 2020 14 (Rescheduled)	Tanjong Pagar United (Singapore)	2–4	(Singapore) Young Lions FC	Jurong East Stadium
	Luiz Júnior 66' (pen.) 90+2'; Raihan Rahman (yellow card) 61'; Syabil Hisham (yellow card) 78'	Report	Khairin Nadim 13' 85'; Ryhan Stewart 45'; Ilhan Fandi 45+2'; Syed Akmal (yellow card) 3'; Danial Crichton (yellow card) 10'	Attendance: 0 Referee: Farhan Mohd; Man of the Match: (Singapore) Khairin Nadim

Pos	Team	Pld	W	D	L	GF	GA	GD	Pts	Qualification or relegation
4	Geylang International	14	6	2	6	18	22	−4	20	Qualification for AFC Cup group stage
5	Balestier Khalsa	14	5	4	5	22	28	−6	19	
6	Hougang United	14	4	3	7	19	24	−5	15	
7	Young Lions (Note: The foreign club – Albirex Niigata (S) – as well as the Football Association of Singapore (FAS) under-21 team, Young Lions, are ineligible for any AFC competition spots.)	14	3	0	11	12	38	−26	9	
8	Tanjong Pagar United	14	0	5	9	14	33	−19	5	

Source: Singapore Premier League
Rules for classification: 1) points; 2) goal difference; 3) number of goals scored; 4) number of wins
