= 2018 Warriors FC season =

Warriors
2018 season
- Chairman: Philip Lam Tin Sing
- Head coach: Mirko Grabovac
- Stadium: Choa Chu Kang Stadium

The 2018 season was Warriors' 23rd consecutive season in the top flight of Singapore football and in the S.League. Along with the S.League, the club also competed in the Prime League, the Singapore Cup and the Singapore League Cup.

== Squad ==
=== S.League squad ===
As of 24 February 2017.

| Squad No. | Name | Nationality | Date of birth (age) | Previous club |
Goalkeepers
| 1 | Hyrulnizam Juma'at ^{>30} | (Singapore) | 14 November 1986 (age 40) | (Singapore) Home United |
| 13 | Mukundan Maran ^{U23} | (Singapore) | 21 July 1998 (age 28) | Youth Team |
| 25 | Fashah Iskandar ^{U23} | (Singapore) | 15 February 1995 (age 31) | (Singapore) Young Lions FC |
Defenders
| 2 | Ismadi Mukhtar ^{>30} | (Singapore) | 16 December 1983 (age 42) | (Singapore) Tampines Rovers |
| 4 | Delwinder Singh | (Singapore) | 5 August 1992 (age 34) | (Singapore) Hougang United |
| 5 | Kento Fukuda (Captain) | (Japan) | 15 May 1990 (age 36) | (Singapore) Geylang International |
| 8 | Emmeric Ong | (Singapore) | 25 January 1991 (age 35) | (Singapore) LionsXII |
| 16 | Daniel Shafiq ^{U23} | (Singapore) | 22 November 1998 (age 27) | Youth Team |
| 24 | Ho Wai Loon | (Singapore) | 20 August 1993 (age 33) | (Singapore) Balestier Khalsa |
Midfielders
| 6 | Ammirul Emmran ^{U23} | (Singapore) | 18 April 1995 (age 31) | (Singapore) Young Lions FC |
| 7 | Shamil Sharif | (Singapore) | 8 May 1992 (age 34) | (Singapore) Home United |
| 14 | Hafiz Sulaiman ^{U23} | (Singapore) | 10 October 1995 (age 31) | (Singapore) Young Lions FC |
| 17 | Poh Yi Feng ^{>30} | (Singapore) | 15 November 1986 (age 40) | (Singapore) Balestier Khalsa |
| 20 | Nur Luqman ^{U23} | (Singapore) | 20 June 1998 (age 28) | Youth Team |
| 21 | Firdaus Kasman | (Singapore) | 24 January 1988 (age 38) | (Singapore) Young Lions FC |
| 23 | Suria Prakash | (Singapore) | 23 December 1993 (age 32) | (Singapore) SAFSA (NFL D1) |
Strikers
| 9 | Jonathan Béhé | (France) | 13 January 1989 (age 37) | (Malaysia) Negeri Sembilan FA |
| 10 | Sahil Suhaimi | (Singapore) | 8 July 1992 (age 34) | (Malaysia) Sarawak FA |
| 11 | Ignatius Ang | (Singapore) | 12 November 1992 (age 34) | (Singapore) SAFSA (NFL D1) |
| 12 | Khairul Nizam | (Singapore) | 25 June 1991 (age 35) | (Singapore) Home United |
| 15 | Fadhil Noh | (Singapore) | 4 March 1989 (age 37) | (Singapore) Balestier Khalsa |
| 22 | Tajeli Salamat | (Singapore) | 7 February 1994 (age 32) | (Singapore) Tiong Bahru FC (NFL D1) |
Players loaned out / placed on injury list / left during season
| 3 | Fazli Shafie ^{U23} | (Singapore) | 6 June 1997 (age 29) | Youth Team |
| 18 | Bryan Quek ^{U23} | (Singapore) | 5 June 1995 (age 31) | Youth Team |
| 19 | Zuhaili Mazli ^{U23} | (Singapore) | 21 October 1997 (age 29) | Youth Team |

== Coaching staff ==
| Position | Name | Ref. |
|---|---|---|
| General Manager | (Singapore) Paul Poh | |
| Head coach | (Croatia) Mirko Grabovac | |
| Assistant coach | (Singapore) Azlan Alipah | |
| Goalkeeping coach | (Singapore) Lee Bee Seng | |
| Team manager | (Singapore) Yeo Jun Xian | |
| Fitness trainer | (Croatia) Marko Skomrlj | |
| Sports trainer | (Singapore) Narasiman Sathivelu | |

== Transfers ==
=== Pre-Season transfers ===
==== In ====
| Position | Player | Transferred From | Ref |
|---|---|---|---|
| GK | (Singapore) Fashah Iskandar | (Singapore) Garena Young Lions | |
| DF | (Singapore) Delwinder Singh | (Singapore) Hougang United | |
| DF | (Singapore) Ismadi Mukhtar | (Singapore) Tampines Rovers | |
| MF | (Singapore) Shamil Sharif | (Singapore) Home United | |
| MF | (Singapore) Ammirul Emmran | (Singapore) Garena Young Lions | |
| MF | (Singapore) Gabriel Quak | (Singapore) Geylang International | |
| MF | (Singapore) Hafiz Sulaiman | (Singapore) Garena Young Lions | |
| MF | (Singapore) Joshua Pereira | (Singapore) Garena Young Lions | |
| FW | (Singapore) Ignatius Ang | (Singapore) SAFSA (NFL Club) | |
| FW | (Singapore) Khairul Nizam | (Singapore) Home United | |
| FW | (Singapore) Sahil Suhaimi | (Malaysia) Sarawak FA | |
| FW | (France) Jonathan Béhé | (Malaysia) Negeri Sembilan FA | |
| FW | (Singapore) Tajeli Salamat | (Singapore) Tiong Bahru FC (NFL Club) | |

==== Out ====
| Position | Player | Transferred To | Ref |
|---|---|---|---|
| GK | (Singapore) Jasper Chan | (Singapore) Geylang International | |
| GK | (Singapore) Zainol Gulam | (Singapore) Geylang International | |
| DF | (Singapore) Zulfadli Zainal Abidin | (Singapore) Geylang International | |
| DF | (Singapore) Baihakki Khaizan | (Thailand) Muangthong United | |
| DF | (Singapore) Hafiz Osman | (Singapore) Warwick Knights FC (NFL Club) | |
| DF | (Singapore) Syaqir Sulaiman | (Singapore) Tiong Bahru FC (NFL Club) | |
| DF | (Singapore) Ang Zhiwei | (Singapore) Tiong Bahru FC (NFL Club) | |
| MF | (Singapore) Hafiz Nor | (Singapore) Home United | |
| MF | (Singapore) Ridhuan Muhammad | (Indonesia) Borneo F.C. | |
| MF | (Singapore) Shaiful Esah | (Singapore) Commonwealth Cosmos (Islandwide League) | |
| MF | (Singapore) Fazli Jaffar | (Singapore) Yishun Sentek Mariners FC (NFL Club) | |
| MF | (Singapore) Sharin Majid | (Singapore) Balestier Khalsa | |
| MF | (Singapore) Gabriel Quak | (Thailand) Royal Thai Navy | |
| FW | (Canada) Jordan Webb | (Singapore) Tampines Rovers | |
| FW | (Singapore) Shahril Ishak | (Singapore) Home United | |
| FW | (Romania) Andrei Ciolacu | (Romania) SC Juventus București | |
| FW | (United States) Clay Silvas | | |
| FW | (Singapore) Samuel Benjamin | (Singapore) GFA Sporting Westlake FC (NFL Club) | |
| FW | (Singapore) Nur Asyidiq | (Singapore) Yishun Sentek Mariners FC (NFL Club) | |

Note 1: Gabriel Quak was initially signed to a deal but released after Navy FC wanted to sign him.

Note 2: Ridhuan Muhammad was released by Borneo FC after the Cup Competition, thus making him a free agent.

Note 3: Baihakki Khaizan moved to Muangthong United but was loaned to Udon Thani before the new season start.

==== Retained ====
| Position | Player | Ref |
|---|---|---|
| GK | (Singapore) Hyrulnizam Juma'at | |
| DF | (Singapore) Emmeric Ong | |
| DF | (Singapore) Ho Wai Loon | |
| DF | (Japan) Kento Fukuda | |
| MF | (Singapore) Poh Yi Feng | |
| MF | (Singapore) Firdaus Kasman | |
| MF | (Singapore) Suria Prakash | |
| FW | (Singapore) Fadhil Noh | |

==== Promoted ====
| Position | Player | Ref |
|---|---|---|
| GK | (Singapore) Mukundan Maran | |
| GK | (Singapore) Bryan Quek | |
| DF | (Singapore) Zuhaili Mazli | |
| DF | (Singapore) Daniel Shafiq | |
| MF | (Singapore) Nur Luqman | |

==== Trial ====
| Position | Player | Trial @ | Ref |
|---|---|---|---|
| DF | (Singapore) Baihakki Khaizan | (Saudi Arabia) Jeddah Club | |

=== Mid-season transfers ===
==== Out ====
| Position | Player | Transferred To | Ref |
|---|---|---|---|
| GK | (Singapore) Bryan Quek | (Singapore) Admiralty FC (NFL) | Loan |
| DF | (Singapore) Fazli Shafie | (Singapore) Admiralty FC (NFL) | Loan |
| MF | (Singapore) Zuhaili Mazli | (Singapore) Admiralty FC (NFL) | Loan |

== Friendly ==
=== Pre-Season Friendly ===
Win Draw Loss

| 31 January 2018 1 | Rydalmere Lions (Australia) | 1–1 | (Singapore) Warriors FC | Jalan Besar Stadium |
| 1700 |

| 9 February 2018 2 | Balestier Khalsa (Singapore) | 1–0 | (Singapore) Warriors FC | Choa Chu Kang Stadium |
| 1900 | Hazzuwan Halim 5' |

| 24 February 2018 3 | Hosei University (Japan) | 2–3 | (Singapore) Warriors FC | Choa Chu Kang Stadium |
| 1700 |

| 3 March 2018 4 | Yishun Sentek Mariners FC (Singapore) | 0–6 | (Singapore) Warriors FC | Choa Chu Kang Stadium |
| 1900 | | | Suria Prakash 4', 45'; Ignatius Ang 27'; Jonathan Béhé 31'; Daniel Shafiq 36'; Ho Wai Loon 50' |

| 6 March 2018 5 | Malaysia U18 | Cancelled | (Singapore) Warriors FC | Choa Chu Kang Stadium |
| 1900 |

| 10 March 2018 6 | Albirex Niigata (S) (Singapore) | Cancelled | (Singapore) Warriors FC | Choa Chu Kang Stadium |
| 1700 |

| 17 March 2018 7 | Singapore U23 | 0–0 | (Singapore) Warriors FC | Jalan Besar Stadium |
| 1900 |

| 19 March 2018 8 | Pahang FA (Malaysia) | Cancelled | (Singapore) Warriors FC | Choa Chu Kang Stadium |
| 1900 |

| 24 March 2018 9 | Albirex Niigata (S) (Singapore) | v | (Singapore) Warriors FC | Choa Chu Kang Stadium |

== Team statistics ==
=== Appearances and goals ===
As of 29 September 2018

| No. | Pos. | Player | Sleague | | Singapore Cup | | Total | |
| No. | Pos. | Player | Apps. | Goals | Apps. | Goals | Apps. | Goals |
|---|---|---|---|---|---|---|---|---|
| 1 | GK | (Singapore) Hyrulnizam Juma'at | 0 | 0 | 0 | 0 | 0 | 0 |
| 2 | DF | (Singapore) Ismadi Mukhtar | 19(2) | 0 | 2 | 0 | 23 | 0 |
| 4 | DF | (Singapore) Delwinder Singh | 16(3) | 0 | 0(1) | 0 | 20 | 0 |
| 5 | DF | (Japan) Kento Fukuda | 21(1) | 5 | 2 | 0 | 24 | 5 |
| 6 | MF | (Singapore) Ammirul Emmran | 18(1) | 0 | 2 | 0 | 21 | 0 |
| 7 | MF | (Singapore) Shamil Sharif | 8(8) | 0 | 0(1) | 0 | 17 | 0 |
| 8 | DF | (Singapore) Emmeric Ong | 21 | 0 | 2 | 0 | 23 | 0 |
| 9 | FW | (France) Jonathan Béhé | 18(2) | 18 | 2 | 1 | 22 | 19 |
| 10 | FW | (Singapore) Sahil Suhaimi | 14(7) | 1 | 0(1) | 0 | 22 | 1 |
| 11 | FW | (Singapore) Ignatius Ang | 8(3) | 2 | 1 | 1 | 12 | 3 |
| 12 | FW | (Singapore) Khairul Nizam | 3(3) | 3 | 1(1) | 0 | 8 | 3 |
| 13 | GK | (Singapore) Mukundan Maran | 18 | 0 | 2 | 0 | 20 | 0 |
| 14 | MF | (Singapore) Hafiz Sulaiman | 13(2) | 0 | 2 | 0 | 17 | 0 |
| 15 | FW | (Singapore) Fadhil Noh | 11(3) | 0 | 2 | 0 | 16 | 0 |
| 16 | DF | (Singapore) Daniel Shafiq | 9 | 0 | 0 | 0 | 9 | 0 |
| 17 | MF | (Singapore) Poh Yi Feng | 10(5) | 0 | 0 | 0 | 15 | 0 |
| 20 | MF | (Singapore) Nur Luqman | 8(3) | 0 | 0 | 0 | 11 | 0 |
| 21 | MF | (Singapore) Firdaus Kasman | 5(9) | 0 | 1 | 0 | 15 | 0 |
| 22 | FW | (Singapore) Tajeli Salamat | 16(3) | 0 | 2 | 0 | 21 | 0 |
| 23 | MF | (Singapore) Suria Prakash | 4(10) | 0 | 0(1) | 0 | 15 | 0 |
| 24 | DF | (Singapore) Ho Wai Loon | 18(1) | 2 | 1(1) | 0 | 21 | 2 |
| 25 | GK | (Singapore) Fashah Iskandar | 6 | 0 | 0 | 0 | 6 | 0 |
Players who have played this season but had left the club or on loan to other club
| 3 | DF | (Singapore) Fazli Shafie | 0 | 0 | 0 | 0 | 0 | 0 |
| 18 | GK | (Singapore) Bryan Quek | 0 | 0 | 0 | 0 | 0 | 0 |
| 19 | DF | (Singapore) Zuhaili Mazli | 0 | 0 | 0 | 0 | 0 | 0 |

== Competitions ==
=== Overview ===
| Competition | Record | | | | | | | |
| Competition | P | W | D | L | GF | GA | GD | Win % |
|---|---|---|---|---|---|---|---|---|
| Singapore Premier League | 24 | 7 | 7 | 10 | 32 | 35 | −3 | 29.17 |
| Singapore Cup | 2 | 0 | 1 | 1 | 2 | 5 | −3 | 0.00 |
| Total | 26 | 7 | 8 | 11 | 34 | 40 | −6 | 26.92 |

=== Singapore Premier League ===
Win Draw Loss

| 4 April 2018 Round 1 | Geylang International (Singapore) | 1–1 | (Singapore) Warriors FC | Bedok Stadium |
| | Ryan Syaffiq 86'; Zulfadli Zainal Abidin (red card) 86' | | Jonathan Béhé 37' |

| 8 April 2018 Round 2 | Warriors FC (Singapore) | 0–1 | (Singapore) Garena Young Lions | Choa Chu Kang Stadium |
| | Ammirul Emmran (yellow card) 41'; Emmeric Ong (yellow card) 52'; Delwinder Singh (yellow card) 77' (yellow card) 87' (yellow-red card) | | Irfan Fandi 53'; Joshua Pereira (yellow card) 34' |

| 15 April 2018 Round 3 | Hougang United (Singapore) | 1–1 | (Singapore) Warriors FC | Hougang Stadium |
| | Fareez Farhan 86' (pen.) (yellow card) 90'; Muhaimin Suhaimi (yellow card) 41'; Fabian Kwok (yellow card) 77' | | Ho Wai Loon 39' (yellow card) 34'; Poh Yi Feng (yellow card) 28'; Emmeric Ong (yellow card) 62'; Faiz Salleh (yellow card) 77' |

| 21 April 2018 Round 4 | Warriors FC (Singapore) | 0–0 | (Singapore) Tampines Rovers | Choa Chu Kang Stadium |
| | Emmeric Ong (yellow card) 43'; Poh Yi Feng (yellow card) 58'; Tajeli Salamat (yellow card) 58'; Fadhil Noh (yellow card) 79'; Ho Wai Loon (yellow card) 85' | | Yasir Hanapi (yellow card) 37'; Fazrul Nawaz (yellow card) 81' |

| 29 April 2018 Round 5 | Balestier Khalsa (Singapore) | 2–1 | (Singapore) Warriors FC | Toa Payoh Stadium |
| | Keegan Linderboom 26'; Noor Akid Nordin 50'; Fadli Kamis (red card) 67'; Sufianto Salleh (yellow card) 89' | | Jonathan Béhé 74'; Hafiz Sulaiman (yellow card) 15' |

| 2 May 2018 Round 6 | Warriors FC (Singapore) | 2–2 | Brunei DPMM | Choa Chu Kang Stadium |
| | Kento Fukuda 7'; Sahil Suhaimi 8' (yellow card) 40' | | Volodymyr Pryyomov 35' (pen.) 67'; Helmi Zambin (yellow card) 24' |

| 5 May 2018 Round 7 | Home United (Singapore) | 3–3 | (Singapore) Warriors FC | Bishan Stadium |
| | Song Ui-young 14' 85' (pen.); Faizal Roslan 83'; Shakir Hamzah (yellow card) 68' | | Ho Wai Loon 2'; Jonathan Béhé 82' 90+4'; Hafiz Sulaiman (yellow card) 13'; Firdaus Kasman (yellow card) 55'; Emmeric Ong (yellow card) 84' |

| 13 May 2018 Round 8 | Warriors FC (Singapore) | 1–2 | (Singapore) Albirex Niigata (S) | Choa Chu Kang Stadium |
| | Jonathan Béhé 79' | | Shuhei Hoshino 20' 71' |

| 20 May 2018 Round 9 | Warriors FC (Singapore) | 0–2 | (Singapore) Geylang International | National Stadium, Singapore |
| | Tajeli Selamat (yellow card) 37'; Poh Yi Feng (yellow card) 44'; Firdaus Kasman (yellow card) 78' | | Fumiya Kogure 13' (pen.); Shawal Anuar 47' | Referee: Muhammad Taqi Aljaafari Bin Jahari (Singapore) |

| 26 May 2018 Round 10 | Garena Young Lions (Singapore) | 1–1 | (Singapore) Warriors FC | Jalan Besar Stadium |
| | Ikhsan Fandi 72'; Joshua Pereira (yellow card) 43'; Hami Syahin (yellow card) 66' | | Jonathan Béhé 37'; Hafiz Sulaiman (yellow card) 58' (yellow card) 68' (yellow-red card); Kento Fukuda (yellow card) 90+4' |

| 2 June 2018 Round 11 | Warriors FC (Singapore) | 2–0 | (Singapore) Hougang United | Choa Chu Kang Stadium |
| | Jonathan Béhé 87' (pen.) 90+3'; Delwinder Singh (yellow card) 10'; Nur Luqman (yellow card) 70'; Poh Yi Feng (yellow card) 77'; Ho Wai Loon (yellow card) 90+1' | | Shahfiq Ghani (yellow card) 10'; Fabian Kwok (yellow card) 65'; Jordan Nicolas Vestering (yellow card) 86' | Referee: Muhammad Taqi Aljaafari Bin Jahari (Singapore) |

| 17 June 2018 Round 12 | Tampines Rovers (Singapore) | 2–3 | (Singapore) Warriors FC | Our Tampines Hub |
| | Khairul Amri 84'; Jordan Webb 88'; Zulfadhmi Suzliman (yellow card) 45' | | Jonathan Béhé 12' (pen.) 32' 61'; Ho Wai Loon (yellow card) 69' | Referee: Jansen Foo (Singapore) |

| 23 June 2018 Round 13 | Warriors FC (Singapore) | 3–0 | (Singapore) Balestier Khalsa | Choa Chu Kang Stadium |
| | Ignatius Ang 20'; Jonathan Béhé 48' 90+1' |

| 30 June 2018 Round 14 | Brunei DPMM | 2–1 | (Singapore) Warriors FC | Hassanal Bolkiah National Stadium |
| | Mojtaba Esmaeilzadeh 57'; Adi Said 66'; Volodymyr Pryyomov (yellow card) 2'; Suhaimi Anak Sulau (yellow card) 77' | | Ignatius Ang 26'; Ho Wai Loon (yellow card) 55'; Poh Yi Feng (yellow card) 72' |

| 4 July 2018 Round 15 | Warriors FC (Singapore) | 0–2 | (Singapore) Home United | Choa Chu Kang Stadium |
| | | | Izzdin Shafiq 51'; Shahril Ishak 76' |

| 8 July 2018 Round 16 | Albirex Niigata (Singapore) | 2–0 | (Singapore) Warriors FC | Jurong East Stadium |
| | Wataru Murofushi 45+1'; Shuhei Hoshino 72' | | Ho Wai Loon (yellow card) 78' | Attendance: W. Ravisanthiran (Singapore) |

| 15 July 2018 Round 17 | Geylang International (Singapore) | 0–1 | (Singapore) Warriors FC | Bedok Stadium |
| | Afiq Yunos (yellow card) 20'; Fairoz Hassan (yellow card) 69'; Anders Aplin (yellow card) 82'; Darren Teh (yellow card) 85' | | Jonathan Béhé 10'; Khairul Nizam (red card) 90+4' | Referee: Nathan Chan (Singapore) |

| 22 July 2018 Round 18 | Warriors FC (Singapore) | 1–0 | (Singapore) Garena Young Lions | Choa Chu Kang Stadium |
| | Kento Fukuda 5'; Fadhil Noh (yellow card) 38'; Ismadi Mukhtar (yellow card) 67'; Jonathan Béhé (yellow card) 70'; Suria Prakash (yellow card) 90+1' | | Jacob William Mahler (yellow card) 36'; Hami Syahin (yellow card) 40'; R Aaravin (yellow card) 63'; Zulqarnaen Suzliman (yellow card) 84' | Referee: Juherman Zaiton (Singapore) |

| 1 August 2018 Round 19 | Hougang United (Singapore) | 1–2 | (Singapore) Warriors FC | Hougang Stadium |
| | Iqbal Hussain 48'; Khairulhin Khalid (yellow card) 79' | | Kento Fukuda 17'; Jonathan Béhé 78' |

| 15 August 2018 Round 20 | Warriors FC (Singapore) | 2–1 | (Singapore) Tampines Rovers | Choa Chu Kang Stadium |
| | Khairul Nizam 57'; Jonathan Béhé 86' (yellow card) 82'; Hafiz Sulaiman (yellow card) 19'; Sahil Sulaiman (yellow card) 79' | | Khairul Amri 20' (pen.); Jordan Webb (yellow card) 75' | Referee: G.Letchmann (Singapore) |

| 19 August 2018 Round 21 | Balestier Khalsa (Singapore) | 2–2 | (Singapore) Warriors FC | Toa Payoh Stadium |
| | Fadli Kamis 40'; Nurullah Hussein 76' (yellow card) 43'; Huzaifah Aziz (yellow card) 88'; Shaqi Sulaiman (yellow card) 94' | | Jonathan Béhé 28' 71'; Firdaus Kasman (yellow card) 65' | Referee: Muhammad Zulfiqar (Singapore) |

| 15 September 2018 Round 22 | Warriors FC (Singapore) | 1–2 | Brunei DPMM | Choa Chu Kang Stadium |
| | Kento Fukuda 34'; Fadhil Noh (yellow card) 36'; Ismadi Mukhtar (yellow card) 94' | | Volodymyr Pryyomov 42' 70'; Abdul Aziz Tamit (yellow card) 34' | Referee: Jansen Foo (Singapore) |

| 23 September 2018 Round 23 | Home United (Singapore) | 4–3 | (Singapore) Warriors FC | Bishan Stadium |
| | Song Ui-young 10' 50' 80' (pen.); Faritz Abdul Hameed 73' | | Khairul Nizam 17' (pen.) 42'; Ignatius Ang 71'; Ho Wai Loon (yellow card) 68'; Emmeric Ong (yellow card) 80' | Referee: W. Ravisanthiran (Singapore) |

| 29 September 2018 Round 24 (Rescheduled) | Warriors FC (Singapore) | 1–2 | (Singapore) Albirex Niigata (S) | Choa Chu Kang Stadium |
| | Kento Fukuda 45' (pen.); Ammirul Emmran (yellow card) 30'; Shamil Sharif (yellow card) 60' | | Wataru Murofushi 24' (yellow card) 60'; Shun Kumagai 57' (yellow card) 39'; Taku Morinaga (yellow card) 90+1' | Referee: Muhammad Farhan B Abd Rahman (Singapore) |

| Pos | Team | Pld | W | D | L | GF | GA | GD | Pts | Qualification or relegation |
|---|---|---|---|---|---|---|---|---|---|---|
| 3 | DPMM FC (Note: The two foreign clubs – Albirex Niigata (S) and DPMM FC – as well as the Football Association of Singapore (FAS) under-21 team, Young Lions, are ineligible for any AFC competition spots.) | 24 | 11 | 8 | 5 | 46 | 38 | +8 | 41 | |
| 4 | Tampines Rovers | 24 | 12 | 4 | 8 | 43 | 27 | +16 | 40 | Qualification to AFC Cup Group Stage |
| 5 | Warriors FC | 24 | 7 | 7 | 10 | 32 | 35 | −3 | 28 | |
| 6 | Balestier Khalsa | 24 | 7 | 6 | 11 | 25 | 36 | −11 | 27 | |
| 7 | Young Lions | 24 | 5 | 6 | 13 | 25 | 46 | −21 | 21 | |

Updated to match(es) played on 29 September 2018. Source: Singapore Premier League
Rules for classification: 1) points; 2) goal difference; 3) number of goals scored; 4) number of wins

=== Singapore Cup ===
Win Draw Loss

| 23 August 2018 Round 1 Leg 1 | Brunei DPMM | 2–2 | (Singapore) Warriors FC | Jalan Besar Stadium |
| | Brian McLean 65'; Volodymyr Pryyomov 84'; Yura Indera Putera (yellow card) 25'; Hendra Azam Idris (yellow card) 90+3' | | Jonathan Béhé 8'; Ignatius Ang 35'; Suria Prakash (yellow card) 64'; Ismadi Mukhtar (yellow card) 71' | Referee: Muhammad Taqi Aljaafari Bin Jahari (Singapore) |

| 19 September 2018 Round 1 Leg 2 | Warriors FC (Singapore) | 0–3 | Brunei DPMM | Choa Chu Kang Stadium |
| | Ho Wai Loon (red card) 89'; Shamil Sharif (yellow card) 90+5' | | Shahrazen Said 9'; Azwan Ali Rahman 28'; Volodymyr Pryyomov 90'; Azwan Saleh (yellow card) 90+5' | Referee: Muhammad Zulfiqar (Singapore) |

Warriors FC lost 5–2 on aggregate.
