= 2020 Warriors FC season =

Warriors
2020 season
- Chairman: Philip Lam Tin Sing
- Head coach: Azlan Alipah
- Stadium: Jurong West Stadium

Warriors FC sat out the 2020 Singapore Premier League season due to financial and legal troubles.

In November 2019, they were charged on court with 107 counts of not paying their staff salaries. In total, they failed to pay more than S$350,000 in salaries to about 30 employees, including players, sports trainers and support staff.

2 days after the incident being reported, ST reported that there were 2 parties that were interested to take over Warriors FC.

On 2 December 2019, the club's management committee said they had paid a total of S$150,000 in salaries to half of its football squad to settle arrears.

On 31 December 2019, FAS had instructed Warriors FC to sit out the 2020 Singapore Premier League season due to their financial issue and legal troubles.

== Squad ==
=== S.League squad ===
As of 11 February 2019

Squad No.	Name	Nationality	Date of birth (age)	Previous club	Contract Start	Contract end
Goalkeepers
13	Shahul Rayyan	(Singapore)	12 February 1995 (age 31)	(Singapore) Albirex Niigata (S)	2019	
Defenders
25	Shameer Aziq	(Singapore)	30 December 1995 (age 30)	(Singapore) Tampines Rovers	2019	2019
Midfielders
10	Poh Yi Feng ^{>30}	(Singapore)	15 November 1986 (age 40)	(Singapore) Balestier Khalsa	2016	2020
Strikers
15	Fadhil Noh ^{>30}	(Singapore)	4 March 1989 (age 37)	(Singapore) Balestier Khalsa	2017	
Players left club during season

== Coaching staff ==
Position	Name	Ref.
General Manager	(Singapore) Paul Poh	
Head Coach	(Singapore) Azlan Alipah	
Assistant Coach	(Singapore) Ismadi Mukhtar	
Goalkeeping Coach	(Singapore) Lee Bee Seng	
Team Manager	(Singapore) Yeo Jun Xian	
Fitness Trainer	(Singapore)	
Sports Trainer	(Singapore) Narasiman Sathivelu	

== Transfers ==
=== Pre-Season transfers ===
==== In ====
Position	Player	Transferred From	Ref
DF	(Singapore) Illyas Lee	(Singapore) Balestier Khalsa	Free
DF	(Singapore) Ruzree Rohzaini	(Singapore) Garena Young Lions	Loan Return
FW	(Singapore) Fazrul Nawaz	(Singapore) Hougang United	

Note 1: Illyas Lee moves to Tiong Bahru FC after the club was excluded from the 2020 Singapore Premier League season. Note 2: Fazrul Nawaz moves to Tampines Rovers after the club was excluded from the 2020 Singapore Premier League season.

==== Out ====
Position	Player	Transferred To	Ref
GK	(Singapore) Fashah Iskandar	(Singapore) Tanjong Pagar United	
GK	(Singapore) (Japan) Kimura Riki	(Singapore) Lion City Sailors U21	
DF	(Japan) Kento Fukuda		
DF	(Singapore) Delwinder Singh	(Singapore) Tanjong Pagar United	
DF	(Singapore) Tajeli Salamat	(Singapore) Home United	
DF	(Singapore) Yeo Hai Ngee	(Singapore) Balestier Khalsa	
DF	(Singapore) (Canada) Danial Scott Crichton	(Singapore) Garena Young Lions	
DF	(Singapore) (Wales) Ryhan Stewart	(Singapore) Garena Young Lions	
DF	(Singapore) Illyas Lee	(Singapore) Tiong Bahru FC (NFL)	
MF	(Singapore) Suria Prakash	(Singapore) Tanjong Pagar United	
MF	(Singapore) Ignatius Ang	(Singapore) Tanjong Pagar United	
MF	(Singapore) Gabriel Quak	(Singapore) Home United	
MF	(Singapore) Faizal Raffi	(Singapore) Balestier Khalsa	
MF	(Singapore) C. Aarish Kumar	(Singapore) Balestier Khalsa	
FW	(Singapore) Sahil Suhaimi	(Singapore) Hougang United	
FW	(Singapore) Khairul Nizam	(Singapore) Geylang International	
FW	(Singapore) Fairoz Hassan	(Singapore) Tiong Bahru FC (NFL)	
FW	(France) Jonathan Behe	(Oman) Al-Nahda Club	

Note 1: Fairoz Hassan moved to Tiong Bahru FC after being released from the club. He subsequently moved to Albirex Niigata (S) during the mid season transfer window

==== Extension / Retained ====
Position	Player	Ref
GK	(Singapore) Shahul Rayyan	
DF	(Singapore) Emmeric Ong	
DF	(Singapore) R Aaravin	
DF	(Singapore) Shameer Aziq	
MF	(Singapore) Ammirul Emmran	
MF	(Singapore) Poh Yi Feng	
FW	(Singapore) Fadhil Noh	

==== Promoted ====
Position	Player	Ref

==== Trial ====
Position	Player	Trial With	Ref
FW	(France) Jonathan Behe	(Malaysia) Penang FA	
FW	(France) Jonathan Behe	(Malaysia) Terengganu F.C. II	

=== Mid-Season Transfer ===
==== Out ====
Position	Player	Transferred To	Ref
DF	(Singapore) Emmeric Ong	(Singapore) Hougang United	
FW	(Singapore) Zulkiffli Hassim	(Singapore) Tanjong Pagar United	
MF	(Singapore) Ammirul Emmran	(Singapore) Tanjong Pagar United	
FW	(Singapore) Fazrul Nawaz	(Singapore) Tampines Rovers	
DF	(Singapore) R Aaravin	(Singapore) Balestier Khalsa	
