= 2016 Warriors FC season =

Warriors
2016 season
- Chairman: (Singapore) Philip Lam Tin Sing
- Head coach: (Singapore) Razif Onn
- Stadium: Choa Chu Kang Stadium
- S.League: Not started
- Singapore Cup: Not started

The 2016 season was Warriors' 21st consecutive season in the top flight of Singapore football and in the S.League. Along with the S.League, the club also competed in the Prime League, the Singapore Cup and the Singapore League Cup.

== Squad ==
=== S.League squad ===
As of 24 February 2017.

Squad No.	Name	Nationality	Date of birth (age)	Previous club
Goalkeepers
1	Yazid Yasin	(Singapore)	24 June 1979 (age 47)	(Singapore) Geylang International
18	Shahul Rayyan	(Singapore)	12 February 1995 (age 31)	(Singapore) Young Lions FC
20	Zainol Gulam	(Singapore)	4 February 1992 (age 34)	Youth Team
22	Jasper Chan	(Singapore)	7 November 1988 (age 38)	(Singapore) Eunos Crescent (NFL)
Defenders
2	Zulfadli Zainal	(Singapore)	26 April 1988 (age 38)	(Singapore) Tampines Rovers
3	Syaqir Sulaiman	(Singapore)	12 August 1986 (age 40)	(Singapore) Hougang United
4	Ismail Yunos	(Singapore)	24 October 1986 (age 40)	(Singapore) Tampines Rovers
5	Kento Fukuda	(Japan)	15 May 1990 (age 36)	(Singapore) Geylang International
6	Madhu Mohana	(Singapore)	6 March 1991 (age 35)	(Singapore) LionsXII
7	Shaiful Esah	(Singapore)	12 May 1986 (age 40)	(Singapore) Tampines Rovers
13	Hafiz Osman	(Singapore)	15 February 1984 (age 42)	(Singapore) Geylang International
24	Jeremy Chiang	(Singapore)	11 April 1985 (age 41)	(Singapore) Hougang United
Midfielders
8	Emmeric Ong	(Singapore)	25 January 1991 (age 35)	(Singapore) LionsXII
9	Poh Yi Feng	(Singapore)	15 November 1986 (age 40)	(Singapore) Balestier Khalsa
10	Nikola Rak	(Croatia)	29 August 1987 (age 39)	(Croatia) NK Lučko
11	Hafiz Nor	(Singapore)	22 August 1988 (age 38)	(Singapore) Geylang International
12	Ridhuan Muhammad	(Singapore)	6 May 1984 (age 42)	(Singapore) Tampines Rovers
14	Ignatius Ang	(Singapore)	11 November 1992 (age 34)	(Singapore) Balestier Khalsa
15	Fazli Jaffar	(Singapore)	9 May 1983 (age 43)	(Singapore) Hougang United
17	Andy Ahmad	(Singapore)	5 April 1991 (age 35)	(Singapore) Woodlands Wellington
19	Hafsyar Farkhan	(Singapore)	16 April 1988 (age 38)	Youth Team
21	Hafiz Rahim	(Singapore)	19 November 1983 (age 42)	(Singapore) Home United
25	Hafiz Sulaiman	(Singapore)	10 October 1995 (age 31)	Youth Team
Strikers
23	Jonathan Béhé	(France)	13 January 1989 (age 37)	(France) SC Toulon-Le Las
26	Marijan Šuto	(Croatia)	2 October 1996 (age 30)	NK Croatia Zmijavci

== Coaching staff ==
Position	Name	Ref.
Head coach	(Singapore) Razif Onn	
Assistant coach	(Singapore) Muhammad Effendi Bin Rahmat	
Assistant coach / Goalkeeping Coach	(Singapore) Lee Bee Seng	
Team manager	(Singapore) Eugene Cheang	
Fitness trainer	(Singapore) Silas Abdul Karim Bin Noor Shah	
Sports trainer	(Singapore) Benjamin Bhagawat	

== Transfers ==
=== Pre-season transfers ===
==== In ====
Position	Player	Transferred From	Ref
GK	(Singapore) Yazid Yasin	(Singapore) Geylang International	
GK	(Singapore) Shahul Rayyan	(Singapore) Young Lions FC	
GK	(Singapore) Jasper Chan	(Singapore) Hougang United	
GK	(Singapore) Zainol Gulam	Singapore Recreation Club	
DF	(Singapore) Shaiful Esah	(Singapore) Tampines Rovers	
DF	(Singapore) Zulfadli Zainal Abidin	(Singapore) Tampines Rovers	
DF	(Singapore) Ismail Yunos	(Singapore) Tampines Rovers	
DF	(Singapore) Madhu Mohana	(Singapore) LionsXII	
DF	(Japan) Kento Fukuda	(Singapore) Geylang International	
DF	(Singapore) Hafiz Osman	(Singapore) Geylang International	
DF	(Singapore) Jeremy Chiang		
MF	(Singapore) Hafiz Nor	(Singapore) Geylang International	
MF	(Singapore) Ignatius Ang	(Singapore) Balestier Khalsa	
MF	(Singapore) Poh Yi Feng	(Singapore) Balestier Khalsa	
MF	(Singapore) Ridhuan Muhammad	(Singapore) Tampines Rovers	
MF	(Singapore) Fazli Jaffar	(Singapore) Hougang United	
MF	(Croatia) Nikola Rak	(Croatia) NK Lučko	
FW	(France) Jonathan Béhé	(France) SC Toulon-Le Las	
FW	(Croatia) Marijan Šuto	NK Croatia Zmijavci	

==== Out ====
Position	Player	Transferred To	Ref
GK	(Singapore) Daniel Ong	(Singapore) Warriors FC	
GK	(Singapore) Neezam Aziz		
DF	(Croatia) Marin Vidošević	(Croatia) HNK Zmaj Makarska	
DF	(Singapore) Marcus Wheeler	(Singapore) Young Lions FC	
DF	(Singapore) Daniel Bennett	(Singapore) Geylang International	
DF	(Singapore) Irwan Shah	(Singapore) Tampines Rovers	
DF	(Singapore) Hamqaamal Shah		
DF	(Singapore) Illyas Lee	(Singapore) Young Lions FC	
MF	(Singapore) (China) Shi Jiayi		
MF	(Singapore) Azlan Razak		
MF	(Scotland) Kevin McCann	(Scotland) Falkirk F.C.	
MF	(Singapore) Karlo Ivancic	(Croatia) NK Zagorec Krapina	
MF	(England) Thomas Beattie	Retire	
FW	(Croatia) Nicolás Vélez	(India) NorthEast United FC	
FW	(Bosnia and Herzegovina) Miroslav Pejić	(Croatia) NK Zagorec Krapina	
FW	(Singapore) Fazrul Nawaz	(Singapore) Tampines Rovers	

=== Mid-season transfer ===
==== In ====
Position	Player	Transferred From	Ref

==== Out ====
Position	Player	Transferred To	Ref

== Team statistics ==
=== Appearances and goals ===
Numbers in parentheses denote appearances as substitute.

No.	Pos.	Player	Sleague		Singapore Cup		League Cup		Total	
No.	Pos.	Player	Apps.	Goals	Apps.	Goals	Apps.	Goals	Apps.	Goals
1	GK	(Singapore) Yazid Yasin	21	0	1	0	1	0	23	0
2	DF	(Singapore) Zulfadli Zainal Abidin	22	0	1	0	0	0	23	0
3	DF	(Singapore) Syaqir Sulaiman	18	2	0	0	3	0	21	2
4	DF	(Singapore) Ismail Yunos	9	0	1	0	4	0	14	0
5	DF	(Japan) Kento Fukuda	24	0	1	0	4	0	29	0
6	MF	(Singapore) Madhu Mohana	18	0	1	1	0	0	19	1
7	MF	(Singapore) Shaiful Esah	16	1	0	0	3	0	19	1
8	MF	(Singapore) Emmeric Ong	12	0	1	0	2	0	15	0
9	FW	(Singapore) Poh Yi Feng	20	0	1	0	4	0	25	0
10	FW	(Croatia) Nikola Rak	22	5	0	0	2	0	24	5
11	MF	(Singapore) Hafiz Nor	21	3	1	0	0	0	22	3
12	MF	(Singapore) Ridhuan Muhammad	12	0	0	0	4	0	16	0
13	DF	(Singapore) Hafiz Osman	18	0	1	0	0	0	19	0
14	MF	(Singapore) Ignatius Ang	7	0	0	0	0	0	7	0
15	MF	(Singapore) Fazli Jaffar	12	3	1	0	2	0	15	3
17	MF	(Singapore) Andy Ahmad	3	0	0	0	3	0	6	0
18	GK	(Singapore) Shahul Rayyan	0	0	0	0	0	0	0	0
19	MF	(Singapore) Hafsyar Farkhan	5	0	0	0	4	0	9	0
20	GK	(Singapore) Zainol Gulam	3	0	0	0	1	0	4	0
21	FW	(Singapore) Hafiz Rahim	20	1	1	0	4	1	25	2
22	GK	(Singapore) Jasper Chan	0	0	0	0	3	0	3	0
23	FW	(France) Jonathan Béhé	23	19	1	0	0	0	24	19
24	DF	(Singapore) Jeremy Chiang	0	0	0	0	1	0	1	0
25	MF	(Singapore) Hafiz Sulaiman	6	0	0	0	0	0	6	0
26	FW	(Croatia) Marijan Šuto	2	1	1	0	3	0	6	1
32	FW	(Singapore) Danial Zulkifli	0	0	0	0	1	0	1	0
38	MF	(Singapore) Aniq Iskandar	0	0	0	0	0	0	0	0
39	DF	(Singapore) Sharin Majid	0	0	0	0	0	0	0	0
40	GK	(Singapore) Mukundan Maran	0	0	0	0	0	0	0	0
Players who have played this season but had left the club or on loan to other club

== Competitions ==
=== S.League ===
Win Draw Loss

14 February 1	Home United	2–2	Warriors	Bishan, Singapore
19:30 UTC+08:00	Khairul 17'; Camara 82'	Details	Béhé 35' (pen.); Fazli 90+1'	Stadium: Bishan Stadium; Attendance: 1,756; Referee: Farhad Mohd

27 February 2	Brunei DPMM	3–1	Warriors	Bandar Seri Begawan, Brunei
20:15 UTC+08:00	McLean 7'; Maududi 26'; Azwan S. 28'	Details	Béhé 47'	Stadium: Hassanal Bolkiah National Stadium; Referee: Sukhbir Singh

4 March 3	Warriors	2–0	Garena Young Lions	Choa Chu Kang, Singapore
19:30 UTC+08:00	Hafiz R. 44'; Béhé 90'	Details		Stadium: Choa Chu Kang Stadium; Referee: Ahmad A'Qashah

11 March 4	Balestier Khalsa	1–1	Warriors	Kallang, Singapore
19:45 UTC+08:00	Fadli 90'	Details	Béhé 56'	Stadium: Jalan Besar Stadium; Referee: G. Letchman

18 March 5	Warriors	2–0	Albirex Niigata (S)	Kallang, Singapore
19:45 UTC+08:00	Syaqir 48'; Béhé 79'	Details		Stadium: Jalan Besar Stadium; Referee: Nathan Chan

1 April 6	Geylang International	2–2	Warriors	Kallang, Singapore
19:45 UTC+08:00	Quak 51'; Delgado 86'	Details	Béhé 16'; Ridhuan 89'	Stadium: Jalan Besar Stadium; Attendance: 1,854; Referee: Farhad Mohd

14 April 7	Warriors	0–1	Hougang United	Choa Chu Kang, Singapore
19:30 UTC+08:00		Details	Kogure 18'	Stadium: Choa Chu Kang Stadium; Referee: W. Ravisanthiran

22 April 8	Warriors	1–2	Home United	Kallang, Singapore
19:45 UTC+08:00	Béhé 63'	Details	Song 20'; Ilsø 85'	Stadium: Jalan Besar Stadium; Attendance: 2,308; Referee: Nathan Chan

30 April 9	Tampines Rovers	4–2	Warriors	Jurong West, Singapore
19:30 UTC+08:00	Mehmet 38'; Pennant 54' (pen.); Hafiz 75', 87'	Details	Hafiz N. 41'; Ridhuan 45'	Stadium: Jurong West Stadium; Attendance: 1,756; Referee: Farhad Mohd

5 May 10	Warriors	1–1	Brunei DPMM	Choa Chu Kang, Singapore
19:30 UTC+08:00	Suto 89'	Details	Paulo Sérgio 61'	Stadium: Choa Chu Kang Stadium; Referee: W. Ravisanthiran

12 May 11	Garena Young Lions	3–1	Warriors	Kallang, Singapore
19:30 UTC+08:00	Hami 5'; Hazim 16'; Khairul 50'	Details	Béhé 85'	Stadium: Jalan Besar Stadium; Attendance: 1,609; Referee: Nathan Chan

17 May^{A} 12	Warriors	0–0	Tampines Rovers	Choa Chu Kang, Singapore
19:30 UTC+08:00		Details		Stadium: Choa Chu Kang Stadium; Referee: Jansen Foo

20 May 13	Warriors	1–1	Balestier Khalsa	Choa Chu Kang, Singapore
19:30 UTC+08:00	Béhé 19'	Details	Krištić 29'	Stadium: Choa Chu Kang Stadium; Referee: G. Letchman

10 June 14	Albirex Niigata (S)	3–2	Warriors	Jurong East, Singapore
20:00 UTC+08:00	Inui 24', 26'; Ishiyama 89'	Details	Rak 37'; Béhé 65'	Stadium: Jurong East Stadium; Referee: Sukhbir Singh

15 June 15	Warriors	2–0	Geylang International	Choa Chu Kang, Singapore
20:00 UTC+08:00	Rak 2', 90'	Details		Stadium: Choa Chu Kang Stadium; Referee: Ahmad A'Qashah

23 June 16	Hougang United	1–3	Warriors	Hougang, Singapore
20:00 UTC+08:00	Nurhilmi 40'	Details	Hafiz N. 61'; Shaiful 85'; Béhé 87'	Stadium: Hougang Stadium; Referee: G. Letchman

4 August 17	Home United	3–0	Warriors	Bishan, Singapore
19:30 UTC+08:00	Ilsø 38', 89'; Song 64'	Details		Stadium: Bishan Stadium; Referee: Ahmad A'Qashah

12 August 18	Warriors	2–3	Tampines Rovers	Choa Chu Kang, Singapore
19:30 UTC+08:00	Béhé 23'; Ridhuan 34'	Details	Mehmet 1', 75' (pen.); Webb 57'	Stadium: Choa Chu Kang Stadium; Referee: G. Letchman

19 August 19	Brunei DPMM	3–0	Warriors	Bandar Seri Begawan, Brunei
20:15 UTC+08:00	Zulfadli 26' (o.g.); Ramazotti 60'; Paulo Sérgio 90+4'	Details		Stadium: Hassanal Bolkiah National Stadium; Referee: G. Letchman

26 August 20	Warriors	5–2	Garena Young Lions	Choa Chu Kang, Singapore
19:30 UTC+08:00	Rak 22'; Béhé 25', 88'; Sulaiman 30'; Nor 63'	Details	Amri 64'; Salime 75'	Stadium: Choa Chu Kang Stadium; Referee: Farhad Mohd

22 September 21	Balestier Khalsa	1–1	Warriors	Toa Payoh, Singapore
19:30 UTC+08:00	Syafiq 87'	Details	Béhé 45' (pen.)	Stadium: Toa Payoh Stadium; Referee: G. Letchman

30 September 22	Warriors	2–0	Albirex Niigata (S)	Kallang, Singapore
19:45 UTC+08:00	Ridhuan 9'; Béhé 86'	Details		Stadium: Jalan Besar Stadium; Referee: Muhd Taqi

14 October 23	Geylang International	2–1	Warriors	Bedok, Singapore
19:30 UTC+08:00	Recha 73'; Sulaiman 77'	Details	Jaffar 52'	Stadium: Bedok Stadium; Referee: Sukhbir Singh

25 October 24	Warriors	5–1	Hougang United	Choa Chu Kang, Singapore
19:30 UTC+08:00	Béhé 51', 69', 90+3'; Rak 57'; Jaffar 81'	Details	Hussain 37'	Stadium: Choa Chu Kang Stadium; Referee: Nathan Chan

Pos	Team	Pld	W	D	L	GF	GA	GD	Pts
5	Geylang International	24	10	7	7	35	29	+6	37
6	Hougang United	24	9	5	10	35	39	−4	32
7	Warriors FC	24	7	7	10	39	39	0	28
8	Balestier Khalsa	24	4	7	13	23	42	−19	19
9	(Singapore) Young Lions (Note: The two foreign clubs – Albirex Niigata (S) and DPMM FC – as well as the Football Association of Singapore (FAS) under-21 team, Young Lions, are not eligible for any AFC competition spots.)	24	2	3	19	23	70	−47	9

Updated to match(es) played on 31 October 2016. Source: S.League
Rules for classification: 1) points; 2) goal difference; 3) number of goals scored; 4) number of wins

=== Singapore Cup ===
Win Draw Loss

27 May 2016	Geylang International	2–1	Warriors FC	Jalan Besar Stadium, Singapore
19:45 UTC+8	Sahil 46'; Faritz 54'	Details	Madhu 21'	Referee: Nathan Chan

=== Singapore TNP League Cup ===
==== Group matches ====
Win Draw Loss

Pos	Team	Pld	W	D	L	GF	GA	GD	Pts	Qualification
1	(Brunei) DPMM FC	3	3	0	0	8	1	+7	9	Advance to semi-final
2	Tampines Rovers	3	2	0	1	10	6	+4	6	Advance to semi-final
3	Hougang United	3	1	0	2	8	9	−1	3	
4	Warriors FC	3	0	0	3	1	11	−10	0	

Source: S.League

13 July 2016	DPMM FC (Brunei)	4–0	Warriors FC	Jalan Besar Stadium, Singapore
19:30 UTC+8	Paulo Sérgio 62'; Adi 69'; Ramazotti 78', 90'	Details		Referee: W. Ravisanthiran

17 July 2016	Warriors FC	0–3	Tampines Rovers	Jalan Besar Stadium, Singapore
19:30 UTC+8		Details	Mehmet 45'; Kwok 55'; Ariyan 62'	Referee: Jansen Foo

21 July 2016	Hougang United	4–1	Warriors	Hougang Stadium, Singapore
19:30 UTC+8	Iqbal Hussain 42' Fumiya Kogure 67' Jozef Kapláň 87' 90'	Details	Hafiz Rahim 71'	Referee: Farhad Mohd
