= Behe =

Behe or Béhé is a surname. Notable people with the surname include:

- Jonathan Béhé (born 1989), French football player
- Michael Behe (born 1952), American biochemist and author
