= Daniel Martens =

Singaporean footballer

Personal information
- Full name: Martens Daniel Jordan Rowsing
- Date of birth: 25 February 1999 (age 27)
- Place of birth: Bukit Batok, Singapore
- Height: 1.80 m (5 ft 11 in)
- Position: Defender

Team information
- Current team: Austin

Youth career
- Tanjong Pagar
- Warriors
- NFA

Senior career*
Years	Team	Apps	(Gls)
2019–2020	Hougang United	2	(0)
2019	→ Albirex Niigata Singapore (loan)	15	(1)
2021	Tanjong Pagar United	7	(0)
2024–2026	Albirex Niigata Singapore	2	(0)
2026–	Austin	0	(0)
- * Club domestic league appearances and goals as of 31 Dec 2021 (UTC)

Martens Daniel Jordan Rowsing (born 25 February 1999) is a Singaporean professional footballer.

== Career ==
In 2019, Martens was on loan to Albirex Niigata Singapore.

== Career statistics ==
=== Club ===
As of match played 5 Dec 2020

Appearances and goals by club, season and competition
Club	Season	League			Cup		Continental		Other		Total	
Club	Season	Division	Apps	Goals	Apps	Goals	Apps	Goals	Apps	Goals	Apps	Goals
Hougang United	2019	Singapore Premier League	0	0	0	0	–		0	0	0	0
Hougang United	2020	Singapore Premier League	2	0	0	0	–		0	0	2	0
Hougang United	Total		2	0	0	0	–		0	0	2	0
Albirex Niigata Singapore (loan)	2019	Singapore Premier League	13	1	2 (Note: Appearances in the Singapore Cup)	0	–		0	0	15	1
Tanjong Pagar United	2021	Singapore Premier League	7	0	0	0	–		0	0	7	0
Career total			22	1	2	0	0	0	0	0	24	1
