= Joey Sim =

Singaporean footballer

Personal information
- Full name: Joey Sim Wei Zhi
- Date of birth: 2 March 1987 (age 39)
- Height: 1.77 m (5 ft 10 in)
- Position: Goalkeeper

Senior career*
Years	Team	Apps	(Gls)
2007	Home United	1	(0)
2008–2009	Sengkang Punggol	24	(0)
2010–2012	Balestier Khalsa	59	(0)
2013–2014	Geylang United FC	11	(0)
2015–2017	Tampines Rovers	29	(0)
2020–2021	Tanjong Pagar United	2	(0)

International career^{‡}
2012–	Singapore	1	(0)
- * Club domestic league appearances and goals as of 9 February 2013 ‡ National team caps and goals as of 9 February 2013

Joey Sim Wei Zhi (born 2 March 1987) is a former Singaporean footballer who last played as a goalkeeper for Tanjong Pagar United.

== International career ==
Sim made his international debut coming on as a substitute for Singapore in a friendly match against Pakistan on 19 November 2012.

== Honours ==
=== International ===
Singapore

- AFF Championship: 2012
