= Ismadi Mukhtar =

Singaporean footballer

Personal information
- Full name: Ismadi bin Mukhtar
- Date of birth: 16 December 1983 (age 42)
- Place of birth: Singapore
- Height: 1.69 m (5 ft 6 1/2 in)
- Position: Right wing-back

Senior career*
Years	Team	Apps	(Gls)
2008–2009	Woodlands Wellington	68	(3)
2010–2017	Tampines Rovers	240	(10)
2018–2019	Warriors	23	(0)
2022–2023	Warwick Knights	0	(0)

International career^{‡}
2014–2015	Singapore	10	(0)
- * Club domestic league appearances and goals ‡ National team caps and goals as of 23:46, 29 November 2014 (UTC)

Ismadi bin Mukhtar (born 16 December 1983) is a Singapore international footballer who last plays as a right wing-back for Singapore Premier League club Warriors.

== Playing career ==
Ismadi plied his trade in the S.League with Woodlands Wellington as his first club, After spending two years with the Rams, Ismadi went on to join league champions Tampines Rovers in 2010.

Since his journey with the Stags, he has won a total of three S.League medals (2011, 2012, 2013) and a Singapore Cup runners-up medal (2012).

== International career ==
Ismadi make his international debut for Singapore in a friendly match against Hong Kong on 10 October 2014.

In November 2014, Ismadi was recalled to the national team to participate in the 2014 AFF Championship.

== Controversial ==
While playing for Singapore Football League 1 club Warwick Knights during a league match against Yishun Sentek Mariners on 29 July 2023, the game was abandoned in the 27th minute after Ismadi received a red card from the referee which the referee called for a penalty for the opposition. The penalty call sparked protests in which Ismadi allegedly using a vulgarity to question the decision. He was shown a red card which Ismadi allegedly engaged in a short tussle with the referee ended up with a torn shirt. While the referee eventually changed into a new kit, a decision was taken for the game to be halted.

On 30 November 2023, Football Association of Singapore has handed Ismadi an 18-month ban and fined him $1,000 after he was found guilty of two charges for bringing the game into disrepute. He is barred from all FAS-sanctioned and organised tournaments matches for 18 months with immediate effect needing to pay the fine within seven days.
