= Yann Motta =

Brazilian footballer

Personal information
- Full name: Yann Motta Pinto
- Date of birth: 24 November 1999 (age 26)
- Place of birth: São Gonçalo, Brazil
- Height: 1.90 m (6 ft 3 in)
- Position: Centre-back

Youth career
- Sampaio Corrêa

Senior career*
Years	Team	Apps	(Gls)
2020	Tanjong Pagar United	14	(2)
2021–2022	Persija Jakarta	14	(1)
2023–2025	Tupi	0	(0)
2025	Corumbaense	0	(0)
2025–2026	Arema	5	(0)
- * Club domestic league appearances and goals as of 15:35, 29 November 2025 (UTC)

Yann Motta Pinto (born 24 November 1999) is a Brazilian professional footballer who plays as a centre-back.

== Career ==
=== Tanjong Pagar United ===
Motta joined Tanjong Pagar United from Sampaio Corrêa in February 2020, and on 6 March, scored on his debut in the Singapore Premier League.

=== Persija Jakarta ===
It was reported on 16 Dec 2020 that he will move to Indonesia club, Persija Jakarta, for the new season. This season was suspended on 27 March 2020 due to the COVID-19 pandemic. The season was abandoned and was declared void on 20 January 2021.

He made his league debut on 5 September by starting in a 1–1 draw against PSS Sleman, and he also scored his first goal for Persija in the 16th minute.

== Career statistics ==
=== Club ===
As of 29 November 2025

Club	Season	League			Cup		Other		Total	
Club	Season	Division	Apps	Goals	Apps	Goals	Apps	Goals	Apps	Goals
Tanjong Pagar United	2020	Singapore Premier League	14	2	0	0	0	0	14	2
Persija Jakarta	2021–22	Liga 1	14	1	0	0	6 (Note: Appearances in Menpora Cup.)	1	20	2
Arema	2025–26	Super League	5	0	0	0	2 (Note: Appearances in Piala Presiden.)	0	7	0
Career total			33	3	0	0	8	1	41	4

== Honours ==
Persija Jakarta

- Menpora Cup: 2021
