= SC Toulon-Le Las =

Defunct association football club in France

Toulon-Le Las
- Full name: Sporting Club Toulon-Le Las
- Founded: 1965
- Dissolved: 2016
- Ground: Stade Delaune
- Capacity: 1,500

Sporting Club Toulon-Le Las (commonly referred to as Toulon-Le Las) was a football club based in Toulon, France. The club was founded in 1965, and merged with Sporting Toulon Var in 2016, forming Sporting Club Toulon.
