= Takahiro Tanaka (footballer) =

Japanese footballer (born 1993)

Personal information
- Full name: Takahiro Tanaka
- Date of birth: November 22, 1993 (age 32)
- Place of birth: Hachiōji, Tokyo, Japan
- Height: 1.70 m (5 ft 7 in)
- Positions: Left back; right back

Team information
- Current team: FC Kariya
- Number: 24

Youth career
- 2005–2011: Tokyo Verdy Youth

Senior career*
Years	Team	Apps	(Gls)
2012–2014	Tokyo Verdy	10	(0)
2013	→ Machida Zelvia (loan)	19	(0)
2015–2018	Briobecca Urayasu	70	(3)
2019	Renofa Yamaguchi	0	(0)
2019	→ Suzuka Unlimited (loan)	10	(0)
2020	Tanjong Pagar United FC	12	(0)
2021–	FC Kariya		
- * Club domestic league appearances and goals as of 15:20, 9 January 2020 (UTC)

Takahiro Tanaka (田中 貴大, Tanaka Takahiro; born November 22, 1993) is a Japanese football player. He plays for FC Kariya.

== Club career ==
=== Tanjong Pagar United ===
Tanaka signed for Tanjong Pagar United FC for the 2020 Singapore Premier League.

== Club statistics ==
Updated to 02 February 2020.

Club performance			League		Cup		Total	
Season	Club	League	Apps	Goals	Apps	Goals	Apps	Goals
Japan			League		Emperor's Cup		Total	
2012	Tokyo Verdy	J2 League	5	0	0	0	5	0
2013	Machida Zelvia	JFL	19	0	0	0	19	0
2014	Tokyo Verdy	J2 League	5	0	0	0	5	0
2015	Briobecca Urayasu	JRL (Kantō, Div. 1)	17	3	0	0	17	3
2016	Briobecca Urayasu	JFL	22	0	0	0	22	0
2017	Briobecca Urayasu	JFL	14	0	1	0	15	0
2018	Briobecca Urayasu	JRL (Kantō, Div. 1)	17	0	0	0	17	0
2019	Renofa Yamaguchi	J2 League	0	0	0	0	0	0
2019	Suzuka Unlimited FC	JFL	10	0	0	0	10	0
2020	Tanjong Pagar United	S.League	12	0	0	0	12	0
Total			121	3	1	0	122	3
