= Syabil Hisham =

Singapore footballer

Personal information
- Full name: Muhammad Syabil Bin Hisham
- Date of birth: 20 September 2002 (age 24)
- Place of birth: Singapore
- Height: 1.82 m (6 ft 0 in)
- Position: Defender

Team information
- Current team: Balestier Khalsa
- Number: 4

Youth career
- –2019: Geylang International

Senior career*
Years	Team	Apps	(Gls)
2020	Tanjong Pagar United	12	(0)
2021–2022	Young Lions	16	(0)
2023	Balestier Khalsa	1	(0)
2025–	Balestier Khalsa	0	(0)
- * Club domestic league appearances and goals as of 15 May 2026

Muhammad Syabil bin Hisham (born 20 September 2002), more commonly known as Syabil Hisham or mononymously as Syabil, is a Singaporean professional footballer who plays as a centre-back for the Singapore Premier League club Balestier Khalsa. He made his professional debut with Tanjong Pagar United FC back in 2020.

== Club ==
=== Young Lions ===
Syabil Hisham joined the Young Lions's project in 2021 and stay for 2 years.

=== Balestier Khalsa ===
In 2023, he joined Balestier Khalsa after 2 years with Young Lions.

== Career statistics ==
=== Club ===
As of 15 May 2026.

Club	Season	League			Cup		Other		Total	
Club	Season	Division	Apps	Goals	Apps	Goals	Apps	Goals	Apps	Goals
Tanjong Pagar United	2020	Singapore Premier League	12	0	0	0	0	0	12	0
Tanjong Pagar United	Total		12	0	0	0	0	0	12	0
Young Lions FC	2021	Singapore Premier League	2	0	0	0	0	0	2	0
Young Lions FC	2022	Singapore Premier League	14	0	0	0	0	0	14	0
Young Lions FC	Total		16	0	0	0	0	0	16	0
Balestier Khalsa	2023	Singapore Premier League	1	0	0	0	0	0	1	0
Balestier Khalsa	2025–26	Singapore Premier League	0	0	1	0	0	0	1	0
Balestier Khalsa	Total		1	0	1	0	0	0	2	0
Career total			29	0	1	0	0	0	30	0
