= Suhairi Sabri =

Singaporean footballer

Personal information
- Full name: Suhairi Bin Sabri
- Date of birth: 23 April 1996 (age 30)
- Place of birth: Singapore
- Position: Midfielder

Team information
- Current team: Tanjong Pagar United
- Number: 21

Senior career*
Years	Team	Apps	(Gls)
2016	Warriors	0	(0)
2017–2019	Lion City Sailors	13	(0)
2020–2021	Tanjong Pagar United	21	(1)
2022–2024	Yishun Sentek Mariners		
2025–	Tanjong Pagar United	1	(0)
- * Club domestic league appearances and goals

Suhairi Sabri (born 23 April 1996 in Singapore) is a Singaporean footballer who now plays for Tanjong Pagar United in his home country.

== Career ==
Sabri started his senior career with Warriors. In 2017, he signed for Lion City Sailors in the Singapore Premier League, where he made thirteen appearances and scored zero goals. After that, he played for Tanjong Pagar United, where he now plays.
