= Kenji Syed Rusydi =

Singaporean footballer

Personal information
- Date of birth: 12 July 1998 (age 28)
- Place of birth: Singapore
- Height: 1.76 m (5 ft 9 in)
- Position: Goalkeeper

Team information
- Current team: Tanjong Pagar United
- Number: 12

Youth career
- –2016: NFA
- 2017–2018: Home United

Senior career*
Years	Team	Apps	(Gls)
2018–2019	Home United	4	(0)
2019	→ Young Lions (loan)	11	(0)
2020–2023	Tanjong Pagar United	28	(0)
2021–2022	→ SAFSA (loan)	0	(0)
2024–2025	Hougang United	5	(0)
2025–	Tanjong Pagar United	0	(0)

International career^{‡}
2019	Singapore U22	1	(0)
- * Club domestic league appearances and goals as of 21:46, 4 July 2020 (UTC) ‡ National team caps and goals as of 21:46, 4 July 2020 (UTC)

Kenji Syed Rusydi Al-Asyraf Bin Syed Ali (born 12 July 1998), better known as Kenji Asyraf, is a Singaporean professional footballer who most plays as a goalkeeper for Singapore Premier League club Tanjong Pagar United.

He was named in the 2019 SEA games squad.

== Club career ==
Kenji make his professional career debut for Home United on 7 April 2018 in 4–2 lost to Brunei DPMM.

In February 2020, Kenji moved to Tanjong Pagar United.

== Career statistics ==
=== Club ===
As of 4 July 2020

Appearances and goals by club, season and competition
Club	Season	League			Cup		Continental		Other		Total	
Club	Season	Division	Apps	Goals	Apps	Goals	Apps	Goals	Apps	Goals	Apps	Goals
Home United	2018	Singapore Premier League	4	0	3 (Note: Appearance(s) in Nedbank Cup)	0	–		0	0	7	0
Home United	2019	Singapore Premier League	0	0	0	0	–		0	0	0	0
Total			4	0	3	0	0	0	0	0	7	0
Young Lions	2019	Singapore Premier League	11	0	0	0	–		0	0	11	0
Total			11	0	0	0	0	0	0	0	11	0
Tanjong Pagar United	2020	Singapore Premier League	10	0	0	0	–		0	0	10	0
Tanjong Pagar United	2023	Singapore Premier League	18	0	3	0	–		0	0	21	0
Total			28	0	3	0	0	0	0	0	28	0
Hougang United	2024–25	Singapore Premier League	1	0	0	0	–		0	0	1	0
Total			0	0	0	0	0	0	0	0	0	0
Career total			43	0	6	0	0	0	0	0	49	0
