= Poh Yi Feng =

Singaporean footballer

Personal information
- Full name: Poh Yi Feng
- Date of birth: November 15, 1986 (age 39)
- Positions: Midfielder; attacking midfielder

Youth career
- 2003-2005: National Football Academy

Senior career*
Years	Team	Apps	(Gls)
2007-2008	Singapore Armed Forces FC	15	(0)
2008–2015	Balestier Khalsa	134	(8)
2016–2019	Warriors	62	(0)
2022-	Warwick Knights	0	(0)
Total		211	(8)

International career^{‡}
2012	Singapore	1	(0)
- * Club domestic league appearances and goals as of 28 February 2017 ‡ National team caps and goals as of 10 February 2013

Poh Yi Feng is a retired Singaporean footballer who played as a midfielder for Warriors FC and Balestier Khalsa in the S League.

== International career ==
Poh earned his first call up to the national team on 2012 for friendlies against Hong Kong and Malaysia. He made his first international debut for the Lions against Hong Kong in the 86th minute in a 1–0 away defeat.

== Honours ==
Singapore Armed Forces FC

- S League: 2007

Balestier Khalsa

- Singapore Cup: 2014
- League Cup: 2013
