= Kento Fukuda =

Japanese footballer

Personal information
- Date of birth: May 15, 1990 (age 36)
- Place of birth: Ibaraki, Japan
- Height: 1.83 m (6 ft 0 in)
- Position: Defender

Team information
- Current team: Warriors
- Number: 5

Youth career
- 1998–2002: Miyawada FC
- 2003–2008: Joso Identy FC

Senior career*
Years	Team	Apps	(Gls)
2009–2012	Shonan Bellmare	1	(0)
2010	→FC Kariya (loan)	15	(1)
2012	→Fujieda MYFC (loan)	16	(0)
2013	Albirex Niigata Singapore	27	(0)
2014–2015	Geylang International	49	(8)
2016–2019	Warriors	91	(8)
Total		108	(10)
- * Club domestic league appearances and goals as of December 31, 2015

Kento Fukuda (福田 健人, Kento Fukuda; born May 15, 1990) is a Japanese football player. He plays for S.League club Geylang International FC.

== Career ==
He is a central defender, who played for Shonan Bellmare for five years, and had loan spells with FC Kariya and Fujieda MYFC.

He first came to Singapore to play in the 2013 S.League season with Albirex Niigata FC (Singapore), appearing in 32 matches and scoring 1 goal in all competitions. It was announced in December 2013 that he, along with teammate - Yuki Ichikawa, have signed for Geylang International for the upcoming season.

He signed for 9 times S.League champions Warriors FC for the 2016 S.League season.

== Career statistics ==
=== Club ===
As of 2 Nov 2019.

Club	Season	League			Emperor Cup		League Cup		AFC Cup		Total	
Club	Season	Division	Apps	Goals	Apps	Goals	Apps	Goals	Apps	Goals	Apps	Goals
Shonan Bellmare	2009	J.League Division 2	0	0	0	0	0	0	0	0	0	0
Shonan Bellmare	Total		0	0	0	0	0	0	0	0	0	0
FC Kariya (on loan)	2010	Tōkai Adult Soccer League	15	1	0	0	0	0	0	0	15	1
FC Kariya (on loan)	Total		15	1	0	0	0	0	0	0	15	1
Shonan Bellmare	2010	J.League Division 1	0	0	0	0	0	0	0	0	0	0
Shonan Bellmare	2011	J.League Division 2	1	0	0	0	0	0	0	0	1	0
Shonan Bellmare	2012	J.League Division 2	0	0	0	0	0	0	0	0	0	0
Shonan Bellmare	Total		1	0	0	0	0	0	0	0	1	0
Fujieda MYFC (on loan)	2013	Japan Football League	16	0	0	0	0	0	0	0	16	0
Fujieda MYFC (on loan)	Total		16	0	0	0	0	0	0	0	16	0
Club	Season	League			Singapore Cup		League Cup		AFC Cup		Total	
Club	Season	Division	Apps	Goals	Apps	Goals	Apps	Goals	Apps	Goals	Apps	Goals
Albirex Niigata (S)	2013	S.League	27	0	1	0	4	0	0	0	32	0
Albirex Niigata (S)	Total		27	0	1	0	4	0	0	0	32	0
Geylang International	2014	S.League	24	7	3	0	4	1	0	0	31	8
Geylang International	2015	S.League	25	1	3	0	4	0	0	0	32	1
Geylang International	Total		49	8	6	0	8	1	0	0	63	9
Warriors FC	2016	S.League	24	0	1	0	4	0	0	0	29	0
Warriors FC	2017	S.League	24	2	1	0	5	0	0	0	30	2
Warriors FC	2018	Singapore Premier League	22	5	2	0	0	0	0	0	24	5
Warriors FC	2019	Singapore Premier League	21	1	6	0	0	0	0	0	27	1
Warriors FC	Total		91	8	10	0	9	0	0	0	110	8
Career total			205	18	16	0	17	1	0	0	211	19
