= Jonathan Béhé =

French footballer (born 1989)

Personal information
- Full name: Jonathan Henri Desire William Béhé
- Date of birth: 13 January 1989 (age 37)
- Place of birth: Marseille, France
- Height: 1.87 m (6 ft 2 in)
- Position: Striker

Youth career
- 2002–2007: Montpellier
- 2007: Hamburger SV
- 2008: Montpellier
- 2008–2009: Guingamp

Senior career*
Years	Team	Apps	(Gls)
2009–2010	Cassis Carnoux	34	(7)
2011	Le Mans	25	(6)
2012	Luch-Energiya	31	(10)
2013–2014	BEC Tero Sasana	30	(8)
2015	SC Le Las	32	(15)
2016	Warriors FC	23	(19)
2017	Sabah	14	(3)
2017–2018	Negeri Sembilan	12	(7)
2018–2019	Warriors FC	66	(48)
2020	Athlético Marseille	2	(1)
2021–2022	Istres	23	(9)
2022–2023	FC Rousset-Ste Victoire	15	(4)
- * Club domestic league appearances and goals

Jonathan Henri Desire William Béhé (born 13 January 1989) is a French former professional footballer who played as a striker.

== Career ==
Béhé began his career playing for the professional club Montpellier. After spending five years in the club's youth academy, he moved to Germany joining Hamburger SV. Béhé spent only six months at the club before returning to Montpellier where he was placed onto the club's Championnat de France amateur team in the fourth division. After six months in the reserves, he joined Guingamp but failed to make an appearance on the club's senior team only featuring in the reserves.

For the 2009–10 season, Béhé joined the semi-professional club SO Cassis Carnoux in the Championnat National, the third division of French football. He had a successful season with the club appearing in 27 total matches and converting ten goals. Following the season, on 18 May 2010, Béhé reached an agreement on a contract with professional club Le Mans who were previously relegated from the first division. On 14 June, the transfer became official with Béhé signing a three-year contract. He was assigned the number 10 shirt and made his professional debut on 30 July 2010 in a Coupe de la Ligue match against Le Havre. Béhé appeared as a substitute in a 2–1 defeat. He made his league debut a week later in a 2–0 victory over Nantes. During his time at Le Mans, he scored 6 goals in 25 appearances for the club.

In 2012, he was signed up by Luch-Energiya to play in Russia. He scored 3 goals in 13 appearances for the club. In 2013, he was signed up by the Thai side, BEC Tero Sasana F.C. where he scored 7 goals in 28 appearances for the club. He was released in December 2013, after the club decided not to renew his contract. On 15 January 2014, he signed a 12 months contract with Championnat de France Amateur 2 side, SC Le Las, scoring 14 goals in 30 appearances in the process, and helped the club to gain a second placing in the league, hence gaining promotion to Championnat de France Amateur, the fourth tier of the French football league. After the conclusion of his contract with SC Le Las, he was signed up by the Singapore side, Warriors FC.

=== Time in Singapore ===
He joined Warriors FC in S.League ahead of the 2016 season. He scored on his debut for the Warriors from the penalty spot in the first game of the season. Béhé continued his fine goalscoring run by notching 3 goals in as many games, notching his new side a first win in the 3rd round of the 2016 S.League season. He notched his 7th goal in 8 games for the Warriors in the Uniformed Derby against Home United but could not secure all 3 points for the Warriors as they slumped to a 2–1 defeat. He notched his 16th league goal of the season for the Warriors in a surprising 2–0 win over the league leaders on 30 September 2016. He scored 19 goals in 23 games to end up as a joint second top goalscorer alongside Ken Ilsø for the 2016 S.League season.

After a season away, Behe rejoined the Warriors for the 2018 Singapore Premier League season. He marked his second debut for the club with a debut goal in the first match week of the 2018 Singapore Premier League season. He has scored 4 goals out of 4 games.

== Personal life ==
Jonathan Béhé was born in Marseille in the south of France. He holds both French and Ivorian nationalities.

== Career statistics ==
As of 2 November 2019

Appearances and goals by club, season and competition
Club	Season	League			National Cup		League Cup		Continental		Total	
Club	Season	Division	Apps	Goals	Apps	Goals	Apps	Goals	Apps	Goals	Apps	Goals
SO Cassis Carnoux	2009–10	Championnat National	28	10	6	0	0	0	0	0	34	10
Le Mans	2010–11	Ligue 2	12	1	1	0	3	1	0	0	16	2
Le Mans	2010–11	Championnat National 2	11	6	0	0	0	0	0	0	11	6
Le Mans	2011–12	Ligue 2	7	0	1	0	1	0	0	0	9	0
Le Mans	2011–12	Championnat National 2	6	1	0	0	1	0	0	0	7	1
Le Mans	Total		36	8	2	0	5	1	0	0	43	9
Luch Vladivostok	2011–12	Russian Football National League	8	1	0	0	0	0	0	0	8	1
BEC Tero Sasana FC	2013	Thai Premier League	7	0	0	0	0	0	0	0	7	0
SC Toulon-Le Las	2015–16	Championnat National 2	8	4	0	0	0	0	0	0	8	4
Warriors FC	2016	S.League	23	19	1	0	0	0	0	0	24	19
Sabah FA	2017	Malaysia Premier League	14	3	0	0	0	0	0	0	14	3
Negeri Sembilan	2017	Malaysia Premier League	12	7	0	0	0	0	0	0	12	7
Warriors FC	2018	Singapore Premier League	20	18	2	1	0	0	0	0	22	19
Warriors FC	2019	Singapore Premier League	23	12	6	1	0	0	0	0	29	13
Warriors FC	Total		43	30	8	2	0	0	0	0	51	32
Athlético Marseille	2019–20	Championnat National 3	2	1	0	0	0	0	0	0	2	1
Career total			181	83	17	2	5	1	0	0	203	86
