= Delwinder Singh =

Singaporean footballer

Personal information
- Full name: Delwinder Singh s/o Ranjit Singh
- Date of birth: 5 August 1992 (age 34)
- Place of birth: Singapore
- Height: 1.79 m (5 ft 10 1/2 in)
- Position: Defender

Team information
- Current team: FC Jurong
- Number: 23

Senior career*
Years	Team	Apps	(Gls)
2011–2012	Tanjong Pagar United	30	(0)
2012–2013	Geylang International	33	(2)
2014	Courts Young Lions	4	(0)
2015–2017	Hougang United	12	(1)
2018–2019	Warriors FC	5	(0)
2020–2021	Tanjong Pagar United	21	(0)
2022	Balestier Khalsa	4	(0)
2023	Geylang International	5	(1)
2023–2024	Angkor Tiger	13	(0)
2025–	FC Jurong		

International career
2012–2022	Singapore U22	4	(0)
2011–	Singapore	5	(0)
- * Club domestic league appearances and goals

Delwinder Singh s/o Ranjit Singh (born 5 August 1992) is a Singaporean professional footballer who plays as a centre-back or full-back for FC Jurong and the Singapore national team. He made his international debut for Singapore in October 2011.

== Club career ==
=== Tanjong Pagar United ===
Delwinder started his career with Tanjong Pagar United in the 2011 S.League season. Despite still being a teenager, he was handed the captaincy of the club at the age of 18.

=== Geylang International ===
In December 2013, Delwinder signed with Geylang International ahead of the 2013 S. League season.

=== Young Lions ===
In January 2014, Delwinder joined Young Lions while serving his compulsory national services.

=== Hougang United ===
Delwinder impressed Hougang United when he played for the LionsXII in a friendly and was subsequently offered a contract. After making over 40 starts in league and cup competitions for the Cheetahs, Delwinder was handed a contract extension for the 2017 S.League season.

=== Warriors ===
Delwinder signed for Warriors in 2018 and his contract was extended for 2019.

=== Return to Tanjong Pagar United ===
On 4 February 2020, after 8 years, Delwinder returned to his boyhood club Tanjong Pagar United.

=== Balestier Khalsa ===
On 10 November 2021, Delwinder signed for Balestier Khalsa ahead of the 2022 Singapore Premier League season.

=== Return to Geylang International ===
On 14 March 2023, Delwinder returned to Geylang International after 10 years.

=== Angkor Tiger ===
On 29 July 2023, Delwinder signed a one-year deal with Cambodian Premier League club Angkor Tiger. He became the first Singaporean player to join a Cambodian side. On 6 August he debuted in a league match against ISI Dangkor Senchey.

== International career ==
Delwinder was handed his first call-up to the Singapore national team in 2011. He became one of the youngest players to represent the Lions, against Philippines at the age of 18. As of March 2016, Delwinder has earned 5 international caps for his country. He has also represented the Singapore U23.

== See also ==
- List of Sikh footballers
