= Fashah Iskandar =

Singaporean footballer

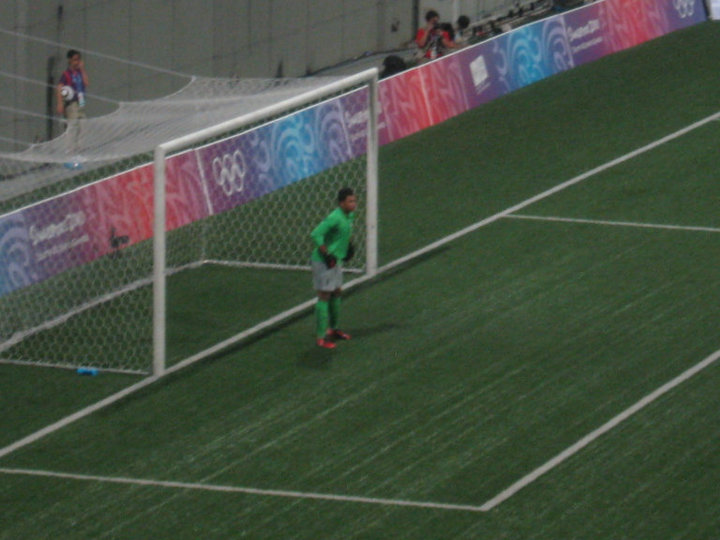
- Fashah Iskandar playing for the Singapore U16s in a 2010 Summer Youth Olympics match against Montenegro.

Personal information
- Full name: Mohammad Fashah Iskandar bin S Rosedin
- Date of birth: 15 February 1995 (age 31)
- Place of birth: Singapore
- Height: 1.87 m (6 ft 2 in)
- Position: Goalkeeper

Senior career*
Years	Team	Apps	(Gls)
2013–2015	Young Lions	0	(0)
2016	Tampines Rovers	0	(0)
2016–2017	Young Lions	8	(0)
2018–2019	Warriors	22	(0)
2020-2025	Tanjong Pagar United	20	(1)

International career^{‡}
2017	Singapore U22	1	(0)
- * Club domestic league appearances and goals as of 12 April 2023 ‡ National team caps and goals as of 3 May 2017

Mohammad Fashah Iskandar bin S Rosedin (born 15 February 1995), more commonly known as Fashah Iskandar or mononymously known as Fashah, is a Singaporean former footballer who played as a goalkeeper.

Fashah made headlines alongside the Singapore under-15 national team in 2010 when the team won bronze in the 2010 Summer Youth Olympics.

== Club career ==
=== Young Lions ===
He started his footballing career in 2013 where he signed for Young Lions. He made 24 appearances in their Prime League squad but failed to make a single appearance for the Cubs.

=== Tampines Rovers ===
In 2016, he signed for Tampines Rovers but didn't make a first team appearance. Fashah did however appear in their Prime League squad in a 5-5 draw to Balestier Khalsa.

=== Young Lions ===
He returned to Young Lions in 2016 and made his first competitive debut there after their French keeper left.

Despite criticism on his weight, Iskandar responded to it by saying “It is not about the body size but performance on the pitch”.

=== Tanjong Pagar ===
Fashah is retained for the 2024 season. He is rumoured to be in the running for national team selection against China in March 2024 and matches against Korea.

== Career statistics ==
As of match played 10 Oct 2021. Caps and goals may not be correct

Club	Season	S.League		Singapore Cup		Singapore League Cup		Asia		Total	
Club	Season	Apps	Goals	Apps	Goals	Apps	Goals	Apps	Goals	Apps	Goals
Young Lions FC	2013	0	0	0	0	0	0	0	0	0	0
Young Lions FC	2014	0	0	0	0	0	0	0	0	0	0
Young Lions FC	2015	0	0	0	0	0	0	0	0	0	0
Young Lions FC	2016	6	0	0	0	0	0	0	0	6	0
Young Lions FC	2017	2	0	0	0	0	0	0	0	2	0
Young Lions FC	Total	8	0	0	0	0	0	0	0	8	0
Warriors FC	2018	6	0	0	0	0	0	0	0	6	0
Warriors FC	2019	16	0	3	0	0	0	0	0	19	0
Warriors FC	Total	22	0	3	0	0	0	0	0	25	0
Tanjong Pagar United	2020	4	0	0	0	0	0	0	0	4	0
Tanjong Pagar United	2021	7	0	0	0	0	0	0	0	7	0
Tanjong Pagar United	2022	2	0	0	0	0	0	0	0	2	0
Tanjong Pagar United	2023	0	0	0	0	0	0	0	0	0	0
Tanjong Pagar United	Total	13	0	0	0	0	0	0	0	13	0
Career total		43	0	4	0	0	0	0	0	46	0

== International career ==
He has been involved in many of the Singaporean national youth teams. He was first called up to the Singapore U22 in 2017 for the match against Vanuatu U20.
