= Emmeric Ong =

Singaporean former footballer

Personal information
- Full name: Emmeric Ong Yu Min
- Date of birth: 25 January 1991 (age 35)
- Place of birth: Singapore
- Height: 1.82 m (5 ft 11 1/2 in)
- Positions: Defender; midfielder

Youth career
- National Football Academy

Senior career*
Years	Team	Apps	(Gls)
2011	Hougang United	11	(0)
2011–2013	Young Lions	16	(0)
2014	LionsXII	0	(0)
2015–2019	Warriors	122	(1)
2020	Hougang United	1	(0)
2021–2022	Tanjong Pagar United	21	(0)
2023–2025	Balestier Khalsa	19	(0)
2025/26	Tanjong Pagar United	1	(0)

International career^{‡}
2017	Singapore	2	(0)
- * Club domestic league appearances and goals as of 21 September 2025 ‡ National team caps and goals as of 24 March 2018

Emmeric Ong Yu Min (born 25 January 1991) is a Singaporean former professional footballer who played as a defender for most recently for Singapore Premier League club Tanjong Pagar United.

Emmeric retired from professional football on 1 February 2026.

== Club career ==
=== Hougang United ===
Emmeric got his break in the S.League when he was still registered as a Prime league player with Hougang United in 2011.

=== Young Lions ===
Commanding a starting spot and impressing the coaches, Emmeric caught the eyes of the national youth setup. He then moved to Young Lions as part of the Sea Games Preliminary Squad during the mid season transfer window. National Service commitments meant that Emmeric was ruled out of the Sea Games and was enlisted to the Army on 3 November 2011. Subsequent years followed in the S.League with the Young Lions, however, appearances were limited due to NS commitments. In 2013, Emmeric was reunited with then Hougang United coach Aide Iskandar. He then started the season as first choice centre back for the Young Lions, making 7 appearances before suffering an ACL injury and was ruled out of the season.

=== LionsXII ===
Emmeric signed for Malaysia Super League side LionsXII for the 2014 season. However, despite being a regular sight on the bench, Ong only managed a solitary appearance for the LionsXII in a 2014 Malaysia Cup match, for the entire season.

=== Warriors ===
Emmeric signed for S.League champions Warriors for the 2015 S.League season after failing to make any appearances for the LionsXII in the 2014 Malaysian Super League. He made just a single Malaysia Cup appearance on the last day of the season. In 2015, Ong was signed by the reigning S.League champions Warriors and looked to provide cover in defence for the champions. He did not feature in the match day squad for the first two league games of the season and remained on the bench for their AFC Champions league qualifier against Myanmar club Yadanarbon. However, things took a turn when Emmeric was given a run out in their 2-0 loss to Maldivian side Maziya and impressed coach Alex Weaver. He then came off their bench against Albirex Niigata (S) in their next league game, started their following AFC Cup game against Indian club Bengaluru and never looked back. Emmeric began to hold down a starting role in the team and kept experienced and foreign players such as Shi Jiayi and Thomas Beattie out of the side. He filled in at right back when needed but was mostly utilised as a holding midfielder. In December 2015, Emmeric signed on to stay at the Warriors for the 2016 S.League season.

His performances in the 2017 Singapore League Cup, in which the Warriors finished as runners-up, saw him earn a spot in Fourfourtwo's League Cup team of the year. 2017 proved to be a good year for Emmeric as he was a mainstay in the team throughout the season, with the club announcing on Facebook that Emmeric had been retained for the 2018 S.League season.

=== Tanjong Pager United ===
In 2021, Emmeric signed for Tanjong Pagar United.

On 25 July 2025, the club announced that Emmeric has returned to the club for the 2025/26 season. He donned the number 13 jersey for the club. Emmeric announced his retirement from professional football on 1 February 2026.

=== Balestier Khalsa ===
On 16 January 2023, Emmeric signed for Balestier Khalsa.

== International career ==
Although he was just a backup player in the LionsXII squad, Emmeric was called up to the Singapore U21 team for the Hassanal Bolkiah Trophy.

In 2017, Emmeric was called up to the national team for the friendly against Hong Kong and the 2019 AFC Asian Cup qualifiers against Turkmenistan on 31 August and 5 September respectively. He made his debut and started the game against Hong Kong but was red carded in the 87th minute.

== Career statistics ==
=== Club ===
As of match played 21 September 2025. Caps and goals may not be correct.

Club	Season	S.League		Singapore Cup		Singapore League Cup		Asia		Total	
Club	Season	Apps	Goals	Apps	Goals	Apps	Goals	Apps	Goals	Apps	Goals
Hougang United	2011	11	0	0	0	0	0	0	0	11	0
Hougang United	Total	11	0	0	0	0	0	0	0	11	0
Young Lions	2011	5	0	—		—		—		5	0
Young Lions	2012	4	0	—		—		—		4	0
Young Lions	2013	7	0	—		—		—		7	0
Young Lions	Total	16	0	0	0	0	0	0	0	16	0
LionsXII	2014	0	0	0	0	0	0	—		0	0
LionsXII	Total	0	0	0	0	0	0	0	0	0	0
Warriors	2015	25	0	2	0	2	0	6	0	35	0
Warriors	2016	12	0	1	0	2	0	—		15	0
Warriors	2017	19	0	1	0	4	1	—		24	1
Warriors	2018	21	0	2	0	0	0	—		23	0
Warriors	2019	15	0	0	0	0	0	—		15	0
Warriors	Total	92	0	6	0	8	1	6	0	122	1
Hougang United	2020	1	0	0	0	0	0	0	0	1	0
Hougang United	Total	1	0	0	0	0	0	0	0	1	0
Tanjong Pagar United	2021	6	0	0	0	0	0	0	0	6	0
Tanjong Pagar United	2022	15	0	1	0	0	0	0	0	16	0
Tanjong Pagar United	Total	21	0	1	0	0	0	0	0	22	0
Balestier Khalsa	2023	12	0	1	0	0	0	0	0	13	0
Balestier Khalsa	2024–25	7	0	1	0	0	0	0	0	8	0
Balestier Khalsa	Total	19	0	2	0	0	0	0	0	21	0
Tanjong Pagar United	2025–26	1	0	0	0	0	0	0	0	1	0
Tanjong Pagar United	Total	1	0	0	0	0	0	0	0	1	0
Career total		161	0	9	0	8	1	6	0	184	1

- Young Lions and LionsXII are ineligible for qualification to AFC competitions in their respective leagues.
- Young Lions withdrew from the Singapore Cup and Singapore League Cup in 2011 due to scheduled participation in the 2011 AFF U-23 Youth Championship.

=== International ===
Singapore national team
Year	Apps	Goals
2017	1	0
2018	1	0

International caps

No	Date	Venue	Opponent	Result	Competition
1	31 August 2017	Jalan Besar Stadium, Kallang, Singapore	Hong Kong	1-1 (draw)	Friendly
2	23 March 2018	Singapore Sports Hub, Kallang, Singapore	Maldives	3-2 (won)	Friendly

== Honours ==
=== Warriors FC ===
- Charity Shield: 2015
