= Hafiz Osman =

Singaporean footballer

Personal information
- Full name: Mohammad Hafiz Bin Osman
- Date of birth: 15 February 1984 (age 42)
- Place of birth: Singapore
- Height: 1.78 m (5 ft 10 in)
- Position: Centre-back

Senior career*
| Years | Team | Apps | (Gls) |
| 2003–2011 | Singapore Armed Forces | 93 | (1) |
| 2012–2014 | Tanjong Pagar United | 60 | (5) |
| 2015 | Geylang International | 24 | (1) |
| 2016–2017 | Warriors FC | 18 | (0) |
| Total | | 195 | (7) |

International career
| 2007 | Singapore | 9 | (0) |

Managerial career
- 2020–2026: Tanjong Pagar United (assistant)
- * Club domestic league appearances and goals

Hafiz Osman (born 15 February 1984) is a retired professional footballer who played in the S.League and the Singapore national football team.

== Club career ==
The natural right-back played in the S-League for Singapore Armed Forces, Tanjong Pagar United and Geylang International FC.

== International career ==
He made his debut for the Singapore national team on 8 January 2007 against Philippines. Osman played 9 times for the Singapore national football team.

He was part of the Singapore Under-23 team that took part in the 2007 Southeast Asian Games in Korat, Thailand that won a bronze medal.

== Honours ==
=== Club ===
Singapore Armed Forces

- S.League: 2006, 2007, 2008, 2009
- Singapore Cup: 2007, 2008

=== International ===
Singapore

- AFF Championship: 2007
- Southeast Asian Games: Bronze Medal - 2007
