= Suria Prakash =

Singaporean footballer

Personal information
- Full name: S. Suria Prakash
- Date of birth: 23 December 1993 (age 32)
- Place of birth: Singapore
- Position: Winger

Team information
- Current team: Tanjong Pagar United
- Number: 17

Youth career
- 2011: National Football Academy U18

Senior career*
Years	Team	Apps	(Gls)
2012–2013	Balestier Khalsa	8	(0)
2014	Warriors FC	6	(0)
2015	Young Lions	17	(1)
2017-2019	Warriors FC	21	(1)
2020–	Tanjong Pagar United	14	(1)

International career^{‡}
2014–	Singapore U23		
2014–	Singapore	2	(0)
- * Club domestic league appearances and goals as of 03:35, 24 December 2017 (UTC) ‡ National team caps and goals as of 03:35, 24 November 2014 (UTC)

S. Suria Prakash (born 23 December 1993) is a Singapore international footballer who plays as a winger for S.League club Tanjong Pagar United.

== Youth career ==
Suria joined the National Football Academy U18 in 2011 before moving to Balestier Khalsa's Centre of Excellence the following year.

== Club career ==
=== Balestier Khalsa ===
He made his professional debut for the Tigers in the 2012 S.League.

=== Warriors FC ===
Suria signed for Warriors in 2014. He was handed his first league start in a 1–0 home win over Brunei DPMM on 22 May. His performances in the 2014 season earned him a nomination for the S.League Young Player of the Year award.

He also finished as second top-scorer in the 2014 Prime League, scoring 16 goals for the reserve side.

=== Young Lions ===
After impressing during the 2014 S.League season, Suria was drafted into the Young Lions team for the 2015 S.League season, in preparation for the 2015 SEA Games. On his Young Lions debut, he laid on an assist to help the Young Lions garner a point in the opening game of the season.

=== Back to the Warriors ===
He scored his first league goal of the 2017 S.League season on his first league start, helping his side to a 2-1 win over Home United. It was announced in end-December 2017 that Suria will stay with the Warriors for the 2018 S.League season.

== International career ==
He made his international debut for Singapore in 2014, playing in a friendly against Papua New Guinea. He gained his second cap 3 days later against Hong Kong.

He was called up by Singapore Under-23 coach Aide Iskandar for the 2015 SEA Games.

== Career statistics ==
=== International ===
As of 24 November 2014

Singapore national team
Year	Apps	Goals
2014	2	0
Total	2	0

== Honours ==
Warriors

- S.League: 2014
