= Ammirul Emmran =

Singaporean footballer (born 1995)

Personal information
- Full name: Ammirul Emmran bin Mazlan
- Date of birth: 18 April 1995 (age 31)
- Place of birth: Singapore
- Height: 1.72 m (5 ft 7 1/2 in)
- Position: Midfielder

Youth career
- 2010–2013: National Football Academy

Senior career*
Years	Team	Apps	(Gls)
2014–2017	Young Lions	42	(0)
2018–2019	Warriors	32	(0)
2020–2021	Tanjong Pagar United	21	(0)
2022–2023	Balestier Khalsa	22	(0)

International career
- Singapore U21
- * Club domestic league appearances and goals as of 02:14, 23 November 2014 (UTC)

Ammirul Emmran bin Mazlan (born 18 April 1995) is a Singaporean professional footballer who last plays as a midfielder for Singapore Premier League club Balestier Khalsa.

Amirul won the inaugural Dollah Kassim Award for youth players in 2010.

== Playing career ==
Ammirul is a graduate of the National Football Academy. He was promoted to the national under-23 developmental side Courts Young Lions in 2014.

Ammirul represented the Singapore national under-14 team at the 2009 Asian Youth Games, and was part of the national under-15 team which won the bronze medal at the 2010 Summer Youth Olympics.

Amirul was also part of Singapore U23 squad playing in the OFC President's Cup held in Auckland.

== Career statistics ==
As of match played 2 Nov 2019. Caps and goals may not be correct

Club	Season	S.League		Singapore Cup		Singapore League Cup		Asia		Total	
Club	Season	Apps	Goals	Apps	Goals	Apps	Goals	Apps	Goals	Apps	Goals
Young Lions	2014	14	0	0	0	-	-	—		14	0
Young Lions	2015	16	0	0	0	-	-	—		16	0
Young Lions	2016	12	0	0	0	-	-	—		12	0
Young Lions	2017	14	0	0	0	0	0	—		14	0
Young Lions	Total	56	0	0	0	0	0	0	0	56	0
Warriors FC	2018	19	0	2	0	0	0	—		21	0
Warriors FC	2019	14	0	2	0	0	0	—		16	0
Warriors FC	Total	33	0	4	0	0	0	0	0	37	0
Tanjong Pagar United	2020	11	0	0	0	0	0	—		11	0
Tanjong Pagar United	2021	10	0	0	0	0	0	—		10	0
Tanjong Pagar United	Total	21	0	0	0	0	0	0	0	21	0
Balestier Khalsa	2022	1	0	0	0	0	0	0	0	1	0
Balestier Khalsa	Total	1	0	0	0	0	0	0	0	1	0
Career total		110	0	4	0	0	0	0	0	114	0

- Young Lions are ineligible for qualification to AFC competitions in their respective leagues.

== Honours ==
Singapore U15

- Summer Youth Olympics: bronze medalist, 2010
