= Ignatius Ang =

Singaporean footballer

Personal information
- Full name: Ignatius Ang Yu Heng
- Date of birth: 11 November 1992 (age 34)
- Place of birth: Singapore
- Height: 1.68 m (5 ft 6 in)
- Position: Winger

Team information
- Current team: Balestier Khalsa
- Number: 30

Senior career*
Years	Team	Apps	(Gls)
2010–2011	Young Lions	2	(0)
2012	Hougang United	15	(1)
2013	Young Lions	11	(1)
2014	LionsXII	0	(0)
2015	Balestier Khalsa	26	(2)
2016	Warriors	7	(0)
2017	SAFSA	12	(1)
2018-2019	Warriors	29	(5)
2020	Tanjong Pagar United	5	(0)
2022–	Balestier Khalsa	87	(14)
- * Club domestic league appearances and goals as of 15 May 2026

Ignatius Ang Yu Heng (born 11 November 1992) is a Singaporean footballer who plays as a winger or midfielder for Singapore Premier League club Balestier Khalsa and the Singapore National Team.

== Youth career ==
Before Ignatius started playing in the S.League, he played for the National Youth Academy, having represented the Under-16 and the Under-18 sides. Ang also played for the H-TWO-O/ITE Dream Team.

== Career ==
=== Young Lions ===
Ignatius started his career with the Young Lions in 2010 and stayed there for 2 years before leaving the club. He rejoined the club in 2013.

=== Hougang United ===
Ignatius made his way to Hougang United after being released in 2011 by the Young Lions.

=== LionsXII ===
Ignatius was drafted by Fandi Ahmad to the LionsXII team in 2014 to compete in the 2014 Malaysia Super League season. However, Ang failed to stake a claim in the team despite being named regularly on the bench.

=== Balestier Khalsa ===
After Ignatius was released by the FAS, he moved to Balestier in January 2015 and enjoyed more playing time after earning the trust of coach Marko Kraljević. His performances for the Tigers saw him earn a 'Young Player of the Year' nomination. During the 2015 AFC Cup, he assisted Jonathan Xu which sees Balestier Khalsa win 2–1 against Indian club East Bengal.

=== Warriors ===
Following good performances with the Tigers, Ignatius choose to move to the Warriors . However, this proved to be a wrong move as Ang failed to get regular game time.

=== SAFSA ===
Ignatius played for SAFSA in 2017, due to National Service.

=== Warriors ===
Ignatius will make a return to the professional S.League with former club, Warriors, in May 2018.

== International career ==
Although he was just a backup player in the LionsXII squad, Ang was called up to the Singapore Under-21 team for the Hassanal Bolkiah Trophy, one of the much-respected Southeast Asian youth tournaments.

On 26 August 2025, Ignatius was first called up to the Singapore national team for the local centralised training squad.

== Career statistics ==
As of 15 May 2026.

Club	Season	S.League		Singapore Cup		Singapore League Cup		Continental		Total	
Club	Season	Apps	Goals	Apps	Goals	Apps	Goals	Apps	Goals	Apps	Goals
Young Lions	2010	0	0	2	0	0	0	0	0	2	0
Young Lions	2011	2	0	0	0	0	0	0	0	2	0
Young Lions	Total	2	0	2	0	0	0	0	0	4	0
Hougang United	2012	15	1	1	0	1	0	0	0	17	1
Young Lions	2013	11	0	1	0	3	1	0	0	15	1
Club	Season	Malaysia Super League		Malaysia FA Cup		Malaysia Cup		Continental		Total	
LionsXII	2014	0	0	0	0	0	0	0	0	0	0
Club	Season	S.League		Singapore Cup		Singapore League Cup		Continental		Total	
Balestier Khalsa	2015	26	2	2	0	4	2	5	0	37	4
Warriors	2016	7	0	0	0	0	0	0	0	7	0
Warriors	2018	11	3	1	1	0	0	0	0	12	4
Warriors	2019	18	2	2	0	0	0	0	0	20	2
Warriors	Total	36	5	3	1	0	0	0	0	39	6
Tanjong Pagar United	2020	5	0	0	0	0	0	0	0	5	0
Balestier Khalsa	2022	20	1	3	0	0	0	0	0	23	1
Balestier Khalsa	2023	20	1	3	0	0	0	0	0	23	1
Balestier Khalsa	2024–25	27	10	4	1	0	0	0	0	31	11
Balestier Khalsa	2025–26	20	2	6	1	0	0	0	0	26	3
Balestier Khalsa	Total	87	14	16	2	0	0	0	0	103	16
Career Total		182	22	25	3	8	3	5	0	220	28
