= 2017 Geylang International FC season =

Geylang International
2017 season
- Chairman: Ben Teng
- Head coach: Hasrin Jailani (until July 2017) Mohd Noor Ali (from July 2017)
- Stadium: Bedok Stadium(until April 2017) Jalan Besar Stadium (from May 2017)
- S.League: 4th
- Singapore Cup: Preliminary round (knocked out by Global Cebu F.C.)
- League Cup: Semi-finals (knocked Out by Albirex Niigata Singapore)

The 2017 season was Geylang International's 22nd consecutive season in the top flight of Singapore football and in the S.League. Along with the S.League, the club also competed in the Prime League, the Singapore Cup and the Singapore League Cup.

== Squad ==
=== Sleague ===
As of 20 February 2017.

No.	Name	Nationality	Date of birth (age)	Previous club
Goalkeepers
1	Nur Amin Malik	(Singapore)	5 June 1995 (age 31)	(Singapore) Warriors FC Prime League
24	Syazwan Buhari	(Singapore)	22 September 1992 (age 34)	(Singapore) Young Lions
Defenders
2	Anders Eric Aplin	(Singapore)	21 June 1991 (age 35)	Singapore Recreational Club (NFL Club)
3	Yuki Ichikawa	(Japan)	29 August 1987 (age 39)	(Singapore) Albirex Niigata (S)
4	Isa Halim	(Singapore)	15 May 1986 (age 40)	(Singapore) Tampines Rovers
5	Darren Teh	(Singapore)		(Singapore) SAFSA
9	Faritz Abdul Hameed	(Singapore)	16 January 1990 (age 36)	(Singapore) LionsXII
18	Al-Qaasimy Rahman	(Singapore)	21 January 1992 (age 34)	(Singapore) Young Lions
Midfielders
6	Jeevakumaran Balakrishnan	(Singapore)		Youth Team
7	Gabriel Quak	(Singapore)	22 December 1990 (age 35)	(Singapore) LionsXII
8	Ricardo Sendra	(Argentina)	4 October 1987 (age 39)	(Argentina) Club Atlético Alvarado
11	Safirul Sulaiman	(Singapore)	12 October 1992 (age 34)	(Singapore) Young Lions
14	Stanely Ng	(Singapore)	27 May 1992 (age 34)	(Singapore) Home United
19	Farish Khan	(Singapore)		Youth Team
20	Nor Azli Yusoff	(Singapore)	17 March 1986 (age 40)	(Singapore) Home United
22	Taufiq Ghani	(Singapore)	19 November 1989 (age 36)	(Singapore) Hougang United
Forwards
10	Shahfiq Ghani	(Singapore)	17 March 1992 (age 34)	(Singapore) Young Lions
16	Víctor Coto	(Costa Rica)	29 September 1990 (age 36)	(Myanmar) Zeyar Shwe Myay
17	Amy Recha	(Singapore)	13 May 1992 (age 34)	(Singapore) Young Lions
21	Shawal Anuar	(Singapore)	29 April 1991 (age 35)	(Singapore) Keppel Monaco (NFL Club)

=== Prime League ===
As of 20 February 2017.

No.	Name	Nationality	Position (s)	Date of birth (age)	Previous club
Goalkeepers
40	Syed Syazwan	(Singapore)	GK		(Singapore) Prime League
41	Yeo Qi Long	(Singapore)	GK		(Singapore) Hougang United Prime League
Defender
30	Affian Jamari	(Singapore)	DF		(Singapore) Prime League
35	Syukrie Abdullah	(Singapore)	MF		(Singapore) Hougang United Prime League
36	Haziq Raheem	(Singapore)	DF		
44	Ashraf Razali	(Singapore)	DF		(Singapore) Prime League
Midfielder
26	Sadiq Rahim	(Singapore)	MF		(Singapore) Prime League
27	Noor Ariff	(Singapore)	MF		
29	Wayne Low Liu Wei	(Singapore)	MF		(Singapore) Hougang United Prime League
34	Min Thi Ha	(Myanmar) (Singapore)	MF		
37	Joan Hairey	(Singapore)	MF	20 August 1998 (age 28)	
45	Umar Akhbar	(Singapore)	MF		Prime League
Forward
32	Ifwat Ismail	(Singapore)	FW		(Singapore) Prime League
39	Asshukrie Wahid	(Singapore)	FW		(Singapore) Balestier Khalsa Prime League

== Coaching staff ==
Position	Name	Ref.
Head coach	(Singapore) Mohd Noor Ali	
Assistant coach	(Japan) Hirotaka Usui	
Goalkeeping coach	(Thailand) Sarong Naiket	
Team manager	(Singapore) Aizat Ramli	
Physiotherapist	(Singapore)	
Kitman	(Singapore) Leonard Koh	

== Transfers ==
=== Pre-season transfers ===
==== In ====
Position	Player	Transferred from	Ref
GK	(Singapore) Nur Amin Malik	(Singapore) Warriors FC Prime League	
DF	(Singapore) Darren Teh	(Singapore) SAFSA	
MF	(Singapore) Farish Khan	(Singapore) Prime League	
MF	(Singapore) Jeevakumaran Balakrishnan	(Singapore) Prime League	
FW	(Costa Rica) Víctor Coto Ortega	(Myanmar) Zeyar Shwe Myay	
FW	(Argentina) Ricardo Sendra	(Argentina) Club Atlético Alvarado	
FW	(Singapore) Asshukrie Wahid	(Singapore) Balestier Khalsa Prime League	(To play for Prime League)

==== Out ====
Position	Player	Transferred To	Ref
GK	(Singapore) Hairul Syirhan	(Singapore) Young Lions	
GK	(Singapore) Russell Santa Maria	Released	
DF	(Singapore) Daniel Bennett	(Singapore) Tampines Rovers	
DF	(Singapore) Shariff Abdul Samat	Released	
MF	(Philippines) Mark Hartmann	(Malaysia) Sarawak	
MF	(Argentina) Carlos Delgado	Released	
MF	(Singapore) Brandon Koh	(Singapore) SAFSA (NFL Club)	
MF	(Spain) Roberto Camarasa	(Spain) Recambios Colón	
FW	(Singapore) Sahil Suhaimi	(Singapore) Tampines Rovers	
FW	(Singapore) Indra Sahdan	(Singapore) Eunos Crescent (NFL Club)	

=== Mid-season transfers ===
==== Out ====
Position	Player	Transferred from	Ref
MF	(Singapore) Umar Akhbar	National Service	

=== Trial ===
Position	Player	From	Ref
FW	(France) Archie Fataki	(France) Balma SC	

== Friendlies ==
=== Pre-season friendlies ===
Win Draw Loss

5 January 2017 Pre-Season Friendly	Johor Darul Ta'zim (Malaysia)	5–0	(Singapore) Geylang International	Seri Gelam Field
	Azamuddin Akil; Ahmad Hazwan Bakri; Brian Ferreira; Fazly Mazlan; Darren Lok	Report

16 January 2017 Pre-Season Friendly	Melaka United (Malaysia)	0–2	(Singapore) Geylang International	Hang Tuah Stadium, Melaka
			Víctor Coto Ortega 40'; Ricardo 57'

19 January 2017 Pre-Season Friendly	Petaling Jaya Rangers (Malaysia)	1–2	(Singapore) Geylang International	MMU Stadium, Cyberjaya
	R. Barath Kumar 26'		Ricardo; Stanely Ng

22 January 2017 Pre-Season Friendly	Young Lions (Singapore)	1–1	(Singapore) Geylang International	Jalan Besar Stadium
5.30pm	Goal		Amy Recha

January 2017 Pre-Season Friendly	SAFSA (Singapore)	3–5	(Singapore) Geylang International
	Goal		Víctor Coto Ortega; Ricardo; Víctor Coto Ortega; Shawal Anuar; Shawal Anuar

4 February 2017 Pre-Season Friendly	Ceres–Negros (Philippines)	5–2	(Singapore) Geylang International	Bedok Stadium
8pm	OJ Porteria; Jason De Jong; Kevin Ingreso; Bienvenido Marañón; Bienvenido Marañón		Goal

9 February 2017 Pre-Season Friendly	Rydalmere Lions FC (Australia)	1–3	(Singapore) Geylang International	Bedok Stadium
	Kosuke Sumiyoshi 45'		Shahfiq Ghani 25'; Yuki Ichikawa 51'; Shawal Anuar 59'

=== In-season friendlies ===
24 March 2017 Friendly	Albirex Niigata (S) (Singapore)	cancelled	(Singapore) Geylang International	Bedok Stadium

26 March 2017 Friendly	Melaka United (Malaysia)	3–2	(Singapore) Geylang International	Bedok Stadium

22 August 2017 Friendly	Pahang FA (Malaysia)	2–0	(Singapore) Geylang International	Jalan Besar Stadium
	D. Christie Jayaseelan

7 October 2017 Friendly	Albirex Niigata (S) (Singapore)	2–1	(Singapore) Geylang International	Jurong East Stadium
	Shoichiro Sakamoto 1'; Tsubasa Sano 23'

Match cancelled after 1st half due to lightning warning signal

== Team statistics ==
=== Appearances and goals ===
Numbers in parentheses denote appearances as substitute.

No.	Pos.	Player	Sleague		Singapore Cup		League Cup		Total	
No.	Pos.	Player	Apps.	Goals	Apps.	Goals	Apps.	Goals	Apps.	Goals
1	GK	(Singapore) Nur Amin Malik	1	0	0	0	0	0	1	0
2	DF	(Singapore) Anders Eric Aplin	17(2)	0	1	0	3(1)	0	21(3)	0
3	DF	(Japan) Yuki Ichikawa	24	2	1	1	4	0	29	3
4	DF	(Singapore) Isa Halim (captain)	16(4)	0	1	0	1(1)	0	18(5)	0
5	DF	(Singapore) Darren Teh	11(1)	0	0	0	0	0	11(1)	0
6	MF	(Singapore) J.Balakrishnan	0	0	0	0	0	0	0	0
7	MF	(Singapore) Gabriel Quak	15(9)	2	0(1)	0	2(1)	1	17(11)	3
8	FW	(Argentina) Ricardo Sendra	20(1)	4	1	1	4	2	25(1)	7
9	DF	(Singapore) Faritz Abdul Hameed	22	1	1	0	3(1)	0	26(1)	1
10	FW	(Singapore) Shahfiq Ghani	17(5)	5	0(1)	0	1(1)	0	18(7)	5
11	MF	(Singapore) Safirul Sulaiman	17(3)	0	1	0	2	0	20(3)	0
14	MF	(Singapore) Stanely Ng	5(3)	1	0	0	0	0	5(3)	1
16	FW	(Costa Rica) Víctor Coto	22	5	1	1	2	1	25	7
17	FW	(Singapore) Amy Recha	9(12)	1	1	0	3(1)	2	13(13)	3
18	DF	(Singapore) Al-Qaasimy Rahman	16(2)	1	1	0	3	0	20(2)	1
19	MF	(Singapore) Farish Khan	0	0	0	0	0	0	0	0
20	MF	(Singapore) Nor Azli Yusoff	10(4)	0	0	0	2(1)	0	12(5)	0
21	FW	(Singapore) Shawal Anuar	15(4)	9	1	0	2(1)	0	18(5)	9
22	MF	(Singapore) Taufiq Ghani	1(1)	0	0	0	1	1	2(1)	1
24	GK	(Singapore) Syazwan Buhari	23	0	1	0	4	0	28	0
27	MF	(Singapore) Noor Ariff	2(1)	0	0	0	3	0	5(1)	0
30	DF	(Singapore) Affian Jamari	0	0	0	0	1	0	1	0
32	FW	(Singapore) Ifwat Ismail	0(7)	0	0	0	1(2)	3	1(9)	3
33	DF	(Singapore) Justin Sim	0(2)	0	0	0	1	0	1(2)	0
34	MF	(Myanmar) Min Thi Ha	2(1)	0	0	0	0	0	2(1)	0
37	MF	(Singapore) Joan Hairey	0(1)	0	0	0	0	0	0(1)	0
39	FW	(Singapore) Asshukrie Wahid	0(5)	0	0	0	1(1)	0	1(6)	0
43	DF	(Singapore) Ahmad Zaki	0(1)	0	0	0	0	0	0(1)	0
44	DF	(Singapore) Ashraf Razali	0	0	0	0	0(1)	0	0(1)	0
Players who have played this season but had left the club or on loan to other club
45	MF	(Singapore) Umar Akhbar	0	0	0	0	0	0	0	0

== Competitions ==
=== Overview ===
Competition	Record							
Competition	P	W	D	L	GF	GA	GD	Win %
S.League	24	11	3	10	32	37	−5	45.83
Singapore Cup	1	0	1	0	4	4	+0	0.00
League Cup	4	2	1	1	9	8	+1	50.00
Total	29	13	5	11	45	49	−4	44.83

=== S.League ===
Win Draw Loss

27 February 2017 Round 1albirex	Hougang United (Singapore)	2–0	(Singapore) Geylang International	Hougang Stadium
	Fumiya Kogure 24'; Iqbal Hussain 87'; Anumanthan Kumar (yellow card) 46'; Syahiran Miswan (yellow card) 82'		Al-Qaasimy Rahman (yellow card) 80'	Attendance: 1,652; Referee: W Ravisanthiran

4 March 2017 Round 2	Geylang International (Singapore)	2–0	(Singapore) Balestier Khalsa	Bedok Stadium
	Al-Qaasimy Rahman 26'; Fadli Kamis 59' (o.g.); Safirul Sulaiman (yellow card) 15'; Víctor Coto Ortega (yellow card) 18'; Shahfiq Ghani (yellow card) 85'		Nanda Lin Kyaw Chit (yellow card) 80'	Referee: Ahmad A'Qashah

10 March 2017 Round 3	Warriors FC (Singapore)	1–1	(Singapore) Geylang International	Choa Chu Kang Stadium
	Kento Fukuda 55'; Jasper Chan (yellow card) 81'		Víctor Coto Ortega 77'; Isa Halim (yellow card) 45'; Víctor Coto Ortega (yellow card) 66'	Attendance: 1,681; Referee: Farhad Mohd

8 April 2017 Round 4	Geylang International (Singapore)	0–4	(Singapore) Tampines Rovers	Jalan Besar Stadium
			Ryutaro Megumi 35', 90'; Yasir Hanapi 61', 81'; Son Yong Chan (yellow card) 23'; Jufri Taha (yellow card) 89'	Attendance: 1,552; Referee: Jansen Foo

15 April 2017 Round 5	Young Lions (Singapore)	0–2	(Singapore) Geylang International	Jalan Besar Stadium
	Jordan Chan (yellow card) 51'; Muhelmy Suhaimi (yellow card) 55'; Syahrul Sazali (yellow card) 86'	Report	Stanley Ng 64'; Shawal Anuar 75'; Anders Eric Aplin (yellow card) 56'; Ricardo Sendra (yellow card) 83'	Attendance: 1,764; Referee: Nathan Chan

20 April 2017 Round 6	Geylang International (Singapore)	2–0	Brunei DPMM FC	Bedok Stadium
	Shafiq Ghani 18'; Víctor Coto Ortega 52' (pen.); Al-Qaasimy Rahman (yellow card) 56'; Shawal Anuar (yellow card) 90'		Nurikhwan Othman (yellow card) 8'; Billy Mehmet (yellow card) 39'; Azwan Ali (yellow card) 65'	Attendance: 1,666; Referee: Farhad Mohamed

28 April 2017 Round 7	Home United (Singapore)	3–0	(Singapore) Geylang International	Bishan Stadium
	Song Ui-young 35'; Stipe Plazibat 81' (pen.); Khairul Nizam 90+4' (pen.)		Safirul Sulaiman (yellow card) 15'; Yuki Ichikawa (yellow card) 81'; Stanley Ng (yellow card) 85' (yellow card) 90+4' (yellow-red card); Anders Eric Aplin (red card) 90'	Attendance: 1,627; Referee: Sukhbir Singh

11 May 2017 Round 8 (Rescheduled)	Geylang International (Singapore)	0–1	(Singapore) Albirex Niigata (S)	Jalan Besar Stadium
	Nor Azli Yusoff (yellow card) 90'		Ryota Nakai 53'	Attendance: 1,145; Referee: W Ravisanthiran

20 May 2017 Round 9	Geylang International (Singapore)	1–1	(Singapore) Hougang United	Jalan Besar Stadium
	Víctor Coto Ortega (penalty missed) 55; Ricardo Sendra 65'; Safirul Sulaiman (yellow card) 30'		Azhar Sairudin 5'; Khairulhin Khalid (yellow card) 34'; Ali Hudzaifi (yellow card) 45'; Delwinder Singh (yellow card) 53' (yellow card) 55' (yellow-red card); Afiq Noor (yellow card) 72'; Fabian Kwok (yellow card) 78'	Attendance: 1,300; Referee: Jansen Foo

26 May 2017 Round 10	Balestier Khalsa (Singapore)	0–1	(Singapore) Geylang International	Jalan Besar Stadium
	Fadli Kamis (yellow card) 87'		Ricardo Sendra 40'	Referee: G Letchman

16 June 2017 Round 11	Geylang International (Singapore)	0–2	(Singapore) Warriors FC	Jalan Besar Stadium
	Amy Recha (yellow card) 77'		Shahril Ishak 16' 20'; Baihakki Khaizan (yellow card) 12'; Fadhil Noh (yellow card) 34'	Attendance: 1,101; Referee: Sukhbir Singh

29 June 2017 Round 12	Tampines Rovers (Singapore)	1–1	(Singapore) Geylang International	Jurong West Stadium
	Fazrul Nawaz 54'; Son Yong Chan (yellow card) 42'; Shakir Hamzah (yellow card) 89'		Ricardo Sendra 85'; Víctor Coto (yellow card) 42'	Attendance: 806; Referee: Muhd Taqi

2 July 2017 Round 13	Geylang International (Singapore)	2–1	(Singapore) Young Lions FC	Jalan Besar Stadium
	Amy Recha 67' (pen.) (yellow card) 72'; Victor Coto 76'; Isa Halim (yellow card) 33'; Ricardo Sendra (yellow card) 90'		Amirul Adli 82'; Illyas Lee (yellow card) 77'; Hami Syahin (yellow card) 89'; Taufik Suparno (yellow card) 90'	Attendance: 1,666; Referee: Jansen Foo

24 July 2017 Round 14	Brunei DPMM FC	0–1	(Singapore) Geylang International	Hassanal Bolkiah National Stadium
	Daúd Gazale (penalty missed) 62; Hazwan Hamzah (yellow card) 67'; Khairul Anwar (yellow card) 90'		Shafiq Ghani 81'; Nor Azli (yellow card) 43'; Faritz Abdul Hameed (yellow card) 76'	Attendance: 1,026; Referee: W Ravisanthiran

23 September 2017 Round 15 (Rescheduled)	Geylang International (Singapore)	1–3	(Singapore) Home United	Jalan Besar Stadium
	Shawal Anuar 90'; Victor Coto (yellow card) 88'		Adam Swandi 55'; Stipe Plazibat 86'; Shamil Sharif 90' (yellow card) 67'	Referee: W Ravisanthiran

5 August 2017 Round 16	Albirex Niigata (S) (Singapore)	5–0	(Singapore) Geylang International	Jurong East Stadium
	Shoichiro Sakamoto 6' (yellow card) 41'; Ryuya Motoda 15' 44' (pen.); Kento Nagasaki 31'; Tsubasa Sano 58'		Al-Qaasimy Rahman (yellow card) 17' (yellow card) 43' (yellow-red card); Gabriel Quak (yellow card) 41'; Safirul Sulaiman (yellow card) 84'	Attendance: 2,244; Referee: Muhd Zulfiqar

18 August 2017 Round 17	Hougang United (Singapore)	0–1	(Singapore) Geylang International	Hougang Stadium
			Shawal Anuar 28'	Attendance: 741; Referee: Muhd Taqi

9 September 2017 Round 18	Geylang International (Singapore)	2–0	(Singapore) Balestier Khalsa	Jalan Besar Stadium
	Gabriel Quak 27' (yellow card) 78'; Shawal Anuar 48'; Nor Azli Yusoff (yellow card) 17'; Faritz Hameed (yellow card) 71'		Huzaifah Aziz (yellow card) 79'; Ahmad Syahir (yellow card) 84'	Attendance: 1,350; Referee: W Ravisanthiran

15 September 2017 Round 19	Warriors FC (Singapore)	0–2	(Singapore) Geylang International	Choa Chu Kang Stadium
	Shaiful Esah (yellow card) 3'; Andrei-Cosmin Ciolacu (yellow card) 16'; Syaqir Sulaiman (yellow card) 64'; Baihakki Khaizan (yellow card) 90'		Shahfiq Ghani 78'; Shawal Anuar 86'; Nor Azli Yusoff (yellow card) 23'; Anders Aplin (yellow card) 52'; Isa Halim (yellow card) 90'	Attendance: 1,828; Referee: Sukhbir Singh

13 October 2017 Round 20	Geylang International (Singapore)	2–3	(Singapore) Tampines Rovers	Our Tampines Hub
	Shawal Anuar 8'; Yuki Ichikawa 47'; Ricardo Sendra (yellow card) 69'; Al-Qaasimy Rahman (yellow card) 90'		Fahrudin Mustafic 38'; Fazrul Nawaz 72'; Fazli Ayob 90'; Madhu Mohana (yellow card) 44'; Fazli Ayob (yellow card) 90'; Khairul Amri (yellow card) 90'; Ismadi Mukhtar (red card) 87'	Referee: Farhad Mohamed

21 October 2017 Round 21	Young Lions FC (Singapore)	0–4	(Singapore) Geylang International	Jalan Besar Stadium
			Shahfiq Ghani 15'; Víctor Coto Ortega 38'; Faritz Abdul Hameed 51'; Shawal Anuar 71'; Anders Aplin (yellow card) 20'	Referee: Ahmad A'Qashah

27 October 2017 Round 22	Geylang International (Singapore)	4–1	Brunei DPMM	Jalan Besar Stadium
	Shawal Anuar 8', 82'; Ricardo Sendra 20'; Víctor Coto Ortega 22'; Shahfiq Ghani (yellow card) 36'; Safirul Sulaiman (yellow card) 85'		Azwan Ali Rahman 51'; Vincent Reyes (yellow card) 40'; Rosmin Kamis (yellow card) 86'	Referee: Muhd Taqi

4 November 2017 Round 23	Home United (Singapore)	2–1	(Singapore) Geylang International	Bishan Stadium
	Stipe Plazibat 33'; Faris Ramli 70'; Shamil Sharif (yellow card) 77'; Aqhari Abdullah (yellow card) 90+3'		Gabriel Quak 46'; Víctor Coto Ortega (yellow card) 12'; Nor Azli Yusoff (yellow card) 31'; Isa Halim (yellow card) 34'; Faritz Abdul Hameed (yellow card) 37'; Anders Eric Aplin (yellow card) 73'	Referee: Jansen Foo

17 November 2017 Round 24	Geylang International (Singapore)	2–7	(Singapore) Albirex Niigata (S)	Jalan Besar Stadium
	Shahfiq Ghani 45' (pen.); Yuki Ichikawa 78'; Victor Coto (yellow card) 45'; Ricardo Sendra (yellow card) 59'; Ifwat Ismail (yellow card) 87'		Kento Nagasaki 14', 66'; Hiroyoshi Kamata 29'; Tsubasa Sano 31', 44', 60'; Yasutaka Yanagi 74'	Referee: Nathan Chan

Pos	Team	Pld	W	D	L	GF	GA	GD	Pts	Qualification
2	Tampines Rovers	24	17	3	4	48	20	+28	54	Qualification to AFC Champions League Preliminary Round 1 or AFC Cup Group Stage
3	Home United	24	15	5	4	58	26	+32	50	Qualification to AFC Cup Group Stage
4	Geylang International	24	11	3	10	32	37	−5	36	
5	Warriors FC	24	9	7	8	33	36	−3	34	
6	Hougang United	24	9	3	12	24	31	−7	30	

Source: S.League
Rules for classification: 1) points; 2) goal difference; 3) number of goals scored; 4) number of wins

=== Singapore Cup ===
Win Draw Loss

21 June 2017 Preliminary round	Geylang International (Singapore)	4–4 (a.e.t.) (2–3 p)	(Philippines) Global Cebu FC	Kallang
20:30 UTC+8	Ichikawa 15'; Ortega 45', (yellow card) 45'; Quak 83' (pen.); Sendra 90'; Halim (yellow card) 11'; Recha (yellow card) 54'		Roberts 19', 39' (pen.), 53'; Minegishi (penalty missed); Clarino 75'; Kaole (yellow card) 70'	Stadium: Jalan Besar Stadium

=== Singapore TNP League Cup ===
Pos	Team	Pld	W	D	L	GF	GA	GD	Pts	Qualification
1	(Brunei) DPMM FC	3	2	1	0	11	4	+7	7	Advance to semi-final
2	Geylang International	3	2	1	0	9	4	+5	7	Advance to semi-final
3	Balestier Khalsa	3	1	0	2	3	5	−2	3	
4	Tampines Rovers	3	0	0	3	2	12	−10	0	

Source: S.League

Win Draw Loss

8 July 2017 Group Stage M1	Balestier Khalsa (Singapore)	0–2	(Singapore) Geylang International	Toa Payoh Stadium
	Sheikh Abdul Hadi (yellow card) 72'		Amy Recha 31'; Ricardo Sendra 50'; Nor Azli (yellow card) 53'	Referee: Muhd Syahir

11 July 2017 Group Stage M2	Tampines Rovers (Singapore)	1–4	(Singapore) Geylang International	Jurong West Stadium
	Fazli Ayob 63'; Ismadi Mukhtar (yellow card) 90'		Ifwat Ismail 53' 64' 85'; Amy Recha 69'	Referee: Ahmad A'Qashah

14 July 2017 Group Stage M3	Brunei DPMM	3–3	(Singapore) Geylang International	Jalan Besar Stadium
	Adi Said 20'; Maududi Hilmi Kasmi 69'; Helmi Zambin 84'; Hanif Hamir (yellow card) 32'; Nurikhwan Othman (yellow card) 60'; Hazwan Hamzah (yellow card) 67'		Víctor Coto Ortega 23'; Ricardo Sendra 48'; Taufiq Ghani 68' (pen.)	Referee: Farhad Mohd

==== Knock out Stage ====
18 July 2017 Semi-final	Albirex Niigata (S) (Singapore)	4–0	(Singapore) Geylang International	Jurong East Stadium
	Takuya Akiyama 28'; Tsubasa Sano 79' 82'; Ryota Nakai 88'		Amy Recha (yellow card) 13'; Syazwan Buhari (yellow card) 62'; Isa Halim (yellow card) 63'; Al-Qaasimy Rahman (yellow card) 65'; Shawal Anuar (yellow card) 72'	Referee: Ahmad A'Qashah
