= 2018 Geylang International FC season =

Geylang International
2018 season
- Chairman: Ben Teng
- Head coach: Hirotaka Usui
- Stadium: Bedok Stadium
Home colours	Away colours

The 2018 season was Geylang International's 23rd consecutive season in the top flight of Singapore football and in the Singapore Premier League. Along with the Singapore Premier League, the club also competed in the Singapore Cup.

== Squad ==
=== Sleague ===
As of 20 February 2017.

No.	Name	Nationality	Date of birth (age)	Previous club
Goalkeepers
1	Jasper Chan	(Singapore)	7 November 1988 (age 38)	(Singapore) Warriors FC
24	Danial Faris ^{U23}	(Singapore)	23 May 1997 (age 22)	Youth Team
25	Zainol Gulam	(Singapore)	4 February 1992 (age 34)	(Singapore) Warriors FC
Defenders
2	Anders Aplin	(Singapore)	21 June 1991 (age 35)	(Singapore) SRC (Defunct NFL Club)
3	Jufri Taha ^{>30}	(Singapore)	4 March 1985 (age 41)	(Singapore) Tampines Rovers
4	Zulfadli Zainal Abidin	(Singapore)	26 April 1988 (age 38)	(Singapore) Warriors FC
5	Darren Teh ^{U23}	(Singapore)	9 September 1996 (age 30)	(Singapore) SAFSA (NFL D1)
11	Yeo Hai Ngee ^{U23}	(Singapore)	12 January 1995 (age 31)	(Singapore) Young Lions FC
14	Danish Irfan ^{U23}	(Singapore)	10 March 1999 (age 27)	(Singapore) NFA U18
15	Afiq Yunos	(Singapore)	10 December 1990 (age 35)	(Singapore) Tampines Rovers
21	Yuki Ichikawa (Captain)	(Japan)	29 August 1987 (age 39)	(Singapore) Albirex Niigata (S)
22	Ahmad Zaki ^{U23}	(Singapore)	20 April 1997 (age 29)	Youth Team
Midfielders
6	Umar Akhbar ^{U23}	(Singapore)		Youth Team
7	Ryan Syaffiq ^{U23}	(Singapore)	1 January 1997 (age 29)	(Singapore) Young Lions FC
8	Azhar Sairudin ^{>30}	(Singapore)	30 December 1986 (age 39)	(Singapore) Hougang United
9	Fuad Ramli	(Singapore)	2 June 1994 (age 32)	(Singapore) SAFSA (NFL D1)
10	Fumiya Kogure	(Japan)	28 June 1989 (age 37)	(Singapore) Hougang United
12	Sadiq Rahim ^{U23}	(Singapore)		Youth Team
13	Ryson Yap	(Singapore)	30 January 1993 (age 33)	(Singapore) Police SA (NFL D1)
16	Noor Ariff ^{U23}	(Singapore)		Youth Team
19	Farish Khan ^{U23}	(Singapore)		Youth Team
Forwards
17	Cameron Ayrton Bell	(Singapore)	18 April 1994 (age 32)	(Singapore) Tampines Rovers Prime League
18	Shawal Anuar	(Singapore)	29 April 1991 (age 35)	(Singapore) Keppel Monaco (Defunct NFL Club)
20	Fairoz Hassan	(Singapore)	26 November 1988 (age 37)	(Singapore) Hougang United
45	Zikos Vasileios Chua ^{U19}	(Singapore)	15 April 2002 (age 24)	(Singapore) NFA U16
Players loaned out / placed on injury list / left during season
24	Syed Syazwan ^{U23}	(Singapore)	17 January 1997 (age 29)	Youth Team
	Ashraf Razali ^{U23}	(Singapore)	14 November 1999 (age 27)	Youth Team

== Coaching staff ==
Position	Name	Ref.
Head coach	(Japan) Hirotaka Usui	
Assistant coach	(Singapore) Vedhamuthu Kanan	
Goalkeeping coach	(Thailand) Sarong Naiket	
Team manager	(Singapore) Andrew Ang	
Physiotherapist	(Singapore)	
Kitman		

== Transfers ==
=== Pre-season transfers ===
==== In ====
Position	Player	Transferred from	Ref
GK	(Singapore) Jasper Chan	(Singapore) Warriors FC	
GK	(Singapore) Zainol Gulam	(Singapore) Warriors FC	
DF	(Singapore) Yeo Hai Ngee	(Singapore) Garena Young Lions	
DF	(Singapore) Jufri Taha	(Singapore) Tampines Rovers	
DF	(Singapore) Zulfadli Zainal Abidin	(Singapore) Warriors FC	
DF	(Singapore) Danish Irfan Azman	(Singapore) NFA U18	
MF	(Singapore) Fuad Ramli	(Singapore) SAFSA (NFL 1)	
MF	(Singapore) Ryson Yap	(Singapore) Police SA (NFL 1)	
MF	(Singapore) Ryan Syaffiq	(Singapore) Garena Young Lions	
MF	(Singapore) Azhar Sairudin	(Singapore) Hougang United	
MF	(Singapore) Fairoz Hassan	(Singapore) Hougang United	
MF	(Japan) Fumiya Kogure	(Singapore) Hougang United	
FW	(Singapore) Cameron Ayrton Bell	Free Agent	

==== Out ====
Position	Player	Transferred To	Ref
GK	(Singapore) Syazwan Buhari	(Singapore) Tampines Rovers	
GK	(Singapore) Nur Amin Malik		
DF	(Singapore) Safirul Sulaiman	(Singapore) Tampines Rovers	
DF	(Singapore) Faritz Hameed	(Singapore) Home United	
DF	(Singapore) Isa Halim	Retired	
DF	(Singapore) Al-Qaasimy Rahman	Retired	
MF	(Singapore) Jeevakumaran Balakrishnan		
MF	(Singapore) Gabriel Quak	(Singapore) Warriors FC	
MF	(Singapore) Stanely Ng	(Singapore) Hougang United	
MF	(Singapore) Nor Azli Yusoff		
MF	(Singapore) Taufiq Ghani		
MF	(Argentina) Ricardo Sendra	(Indonesia) Perseru Serui	
MF	(Singapore) (Myanmar) Min Thi Ha		
MF	(Singapore) Asshukrie Wahid	(Singapore) Garena Young Lions	
FW	(Costa Rica) Víctor Coto Ortega		
FW	(Singapore) Shahfiq Ghani	(Singapore) Hougang United	
FW	(Singapore) Amy Recha	(Singapore) Home United	
FW	(Singapore) Ifwat Ismail	(Singapore) Garena Young Lions	

Note 1: Ricardo Sendra was initially signed by Perseru but was released before the season start.

==== Retained ====
Position	Player	Ref
DF	(Singapore) Darren Teh	
DF	(Singapore) Anders Eric Aplin	
DF	(Japan) Yuki Ichikawa	
MF	(Singapore) Farish Khan	
FW	(Singapore) Shawal Anuar	

Note 2: Yuki Ichikawa was initially released after the season but subsequently re-signed for 2018.

==== Promoted ====
Position	Player	Ref
GK	(Singapore) Syed Syazwan	
DF	(Singapore) Ashraf Razali	
DF	(Singapore) Ahmad Zaki	
MF	(Singapore) Noor Ariff	
MF	(Singapore) Sadiq Rahim	
MF	(Singapore) Umar Akhbar	

==== Trial ====
===== Trial (In) =====
Position	Player	Trial @	Ref
MF	(Australia) Addison Sayan	(Australia) Rydalmere FC	

===== Trial (Out) =====
Position	Player	Trial @	Ref
DF	(Singapore) Anders Aplin	(Japan) Matsumoto Yamaga	

=== Mid-season transfers ===
==== In ====
Position	Player	Transferred from	Ref
GK	(Singapore) Faris Danial	Free Agent	
DF	(Singapore) Afiq Yunos	(Singapore) Tampines Rovers	Loan

==== Out ====
Position	Player	Transferred To	Ref
GK	(Singapore) Syed Syazwan	NS till 2020	
DF	(Singapore) Anders Aplin	(Japan) Matsumoto Yamaga	Loan

==== Trial ====
===== Trial (In) =====
Position	Player	Trial From	Ref
FW	(Singapore) Zulkiffli Hassim	(Singapore) Yishun Sentek Mariners FC	

== Friendlies ==
=== Pre-Season Friendly ===
Win Draw Loss

10 January 2018 1	Singapore Cricket Club	2–3	(Singapore) Geylang International	Turf City Pitch 3
1915 hours

11 January 2018 2	Tampines Rovers (Singapore)	2–0	(Singapore) Geylang International	Our Tampines Hub
1700 hours	Zulfadhmi Suzliman 59'; Fahrudin Mustafic 83' (pen.)

19 January 2018 3	UiTM (Malaysia)	2–1	(Singapore) Geylang International	Skudai Johor
2045 hours			Nur Na'im Ishak	Stadium: UTM Stadium

26 January 2018 4	JDT II (Malaysia)	3–0	(Singapore) Geylang International	Jalan Besar Stadium
1915 hours	Rozaimi Abdul Rahman 25', 90'; Nicolás Alberto Fernández 65'

29 January 2018 5	Rydalmere Lions (Australia)	1–0	(Singapore) Geylang International	Jalan Besar Stadium
1700 hours

13 February 2018 6	GFA Sporting Westlake FC (Singapore)	0–6	(Singapore) Geylang International	Bedok Stadium

23 February 2018 7	Yishun Sentek Mariners FC (Singapore)	2–3	(Singapore) Geylang International	Bedok Stadium
1900

2 March 2018 8	Tiong Bahru FC (Singapore)	Postponed	(Singapore) Geylang International	Bedok Stadium
1900 hours

2 March 2018 8	South Avenue FC (Singapore)	1–2	(Singapore) Geylang International	Bedok Stadium
1900 hours

3 March 2018 9	Balestier Khalsa (Singapore)	0–1	(Singapore) Geylang International	Bedok Stadium
1700 hours			Darren Teh

17 March 2018 10	Albirex Niigata (S) (Singapore)	2–0	(Singapore) Geylang International	Bedok Stadium
1700 hours	Taku Morinaga 11'; Wataru Murofushi 42'	Report

23 March 2018 11	Tiong Bahru FC (Singapore)	v	(Singapore) Geylang International	Bedok Stadium
1900 hours

=== Batam Pre-season tour ===
10 March 2018 1	EPSON Batam (Indonesia)	1–3	(Singapore) Geylang International	Gelora Citramas Stadium

12 March 2018 2	Immigration FC JKR (Indonesia)	2–0	(Singapore) Geylang International	Gelora Citramas Stadium

== Team statistics ==
=== Appearances and goals ===
As of 29 September 2018.

No.	Pos.	Player	Sleague		Singapore Cup		Total	
No.	Pos.	Player	Apps.	Goals	Apps.	Goals	Apps.	Goals
1	GK	(Singapore) Jasper Chan	5(3)	0	0	0	8	0
3	DF	(Singapore) Jufri Taha	24	0	2	0	26	0
4	DF	(Singapore) Zulfadli Zainal Abidin	13(3)	0	2	0	18	0
5	DF	(Singapore) Darren Teh	24	1	2	0	26	1
6	MF	(Singapore) Umar Akhbar	2(1)	0	0	0	3	0
7	MF	(Singapore) Ryan Syaffiq	20(3)	2	0	0	23	2
8	MF	(Singapore) Azhar Sairudin	9(13)	1	2	0	24	1
9	MF	(Singapore) Fuad Ramli	15(4)	0	2	0	21	0
10	MF	(Japan) Fumiya Kogure	21	1	0	0	21	1
11	DF	(Singapore) Yeo Hai Ngee	9(7)	3	1(1)	0	18	3
12	MF	(Singapore) Sadiq Rahim	0(4)	0	0	0	4	0
13	MF	(Singapore) Ryson Yap	7(6)	0	0	0	13	0
14	DF	(Singapore) Danish Irfan Azman	15(2)	0	2	0	19	0
15	DF	(Singapore) Afiq Yunos	10	0	2	0	12	0
16	MF	(Singapore) Noor Ariff	4(4)	1	0	0	8	1
17	FW	(Singapore) Cameron Ayrton Bell	2(7)	1	0(2)	0	11	1
18	FW	(Singapore) Shawal Anuar	15	7	0	0	15	7
19	MF	(Singapore) Farish Khan	0	0	0	0	0	0
20	FW	(Singapore) Fairoz Hassan	19(3)	7	2	0	23	7
21	DF	(Japan) Yuki Ichikawa	23	1	2	0	25	1
22	DF	(Singapore) Ahmad Zaki	2(5)	0	1(1)	0	9	0
24	GK	(Singapore) Faris Danial	2	0	0	0	2	0
25	GK	(Singapore) Zainol Gulam	17	0	2	0	19	0
45	FW	(Singapore) Zikos Vasileios Chua	1(1)	0	0	0	2	0
Players who have played this season but had left the club or on loan to other club
2	DF	(Singapore) Anders Aplin	6(2)	1	0	0	8	1
15	DF	(Singapore) Ashraf Razali	0	0	0	0	0	0
24	GK	(Singapore) Syed Syazwan	0	0	0	0	0	0

== Competitions ==
=== Overview ===
Competition	Record							
Competition	P	W	D	L	GF	GA	GD	Win %
Singapore Premier League	24	5	5	14	26	57	−31	20.83
Singapore Cup	2	0	1	1	0	1	−1	0.00
Total	26	5	6	15	26	58	−32	19.23

=== Singapore Premier League ===
Win Draw Loss

4 April 2018 Round 1	Geylang International (Singapore)	1–1	(Singapore) Warriors FC	Bedok Stadium
	Ryan Syaffiq 86'; Zulfadli Zainal Abidin (red card) 86'		Jonathan Béhé 37'

7 April 2018 Round 2	Tampines Rovers (Singapore)	3–1	(Singapore) Geylang International	Our Tampines Hub
	Jordan Webb 1' 36'; Khairul Amri 81' (pen.)		Fairoz Hasan 45+5'; Yuki Ichikawa (yellow card) 84'

14 April 2018 Round 3	Geylang International (Singapore)	0–1	(Singapore) Balestier Khalsa	Bedok Stadium
			Fadli Kamis 19' (yellow card) 78'; Afiq Salman Tan (yellow card) 46'; Huzaifah Aziz (yellow card) 75'

17 April 2018 Round 4	Brunei DPMM	4–1	(Singapore) Geylang International	Hassanal Bolkiah National Stadium
	Adi Said 12'; Mojtaba Esmaeilzadeh 24'; Volodymyr Pryyomov 54' 56'; Nur Ikhwan Othman (yellow card) 79'		Noor Ariff 20'	Referee: Nathan Chan (Singapore)

22 April 2018 Round 5	Geylang International (Singapore)	1–4	(Singapore) Home United	Bedok Stadium
	Shawal Anuar 49'; Fairoz Hassan (yellow card) 11'; Darren Teh (yellow card) 90+3'		Hafiz Nor 2' 24'; Shahril Ishak 36'; Faizal Roslan 45+1'

28 April 2018 Round 6	Albirex Niigata (S) (Singapore)	5–0	(Singapore) Geylang International	Jurong East Stadium
	Wataru Murofushi 17'; Kenya Takahashi 30'; Taku Morinaga 71'; Shuhei Hoshino 82'; Ryujiro Yamanaka 85'		Shawal Anuar (yellow card) 62'

9 May 2018 Round 7	Geylang International (Singapore)	1–1	(Singapore) Garena Young Lions	Bedok Stadium
	Shawal Anuar 8'		Ifwat Ismail 81'

12 May 2018 Round 8	Hougang United (Singapore)	1–3	(Singapore) Geylang International	Hougang Stadium
	Iqbal Hussain 87'		Shawal Anuar 2' 45'; Azhar Sairudin 75'

20 May 2018 Round 9	Warriors FC (Singapore)	0–2	(Singapore) Geylang International	National Stadium, Singapore
	Tajeli Selamat (yellow card) 37'; Poh Yi Feng (yellow card) 44'; Firdaus Kasman (yellow card) 78'		Fumiya Kogure 13' (pen.); Shawal Anuar 47'	Referee: Muhammad Taqi Aljaafari Bin Jahari (Singapore)

27 May 2018 Round 10	Geylang International (Singapore)	1–2	(Singapore) Tampines Rovers	Bedok Stadium
	Fairoz Hasan 90'; Faud Ramli (yellow card) 59'		Ryutaro Megumi 85'; Fazrul Nawaz 90'

2 June 2018 Round 11	Balestier Khalsa (Singapore)	1–2	(Singapore) Geylang International	Toa Payoh Stadium
	Huzaifah Aziz 30' (pen.) (yellow card) 70'; Nurullah Hussein (yellow card) 51'; Noor Akid Nordin (yellow card) 57'		Fairoz Hasan 1'; Yuki Ichikawa 74'; Jufri Taha (yellow card) 29'

10 June 2018 Round 12	Geylang International (Singapore)	2–6	Brunei DPMM	Bedok Stadium
	Fairoz Hasan 69'; Shawal Anuar 73'		Volodymyr Pryyomov 6'; Adi Said 45' 85'; Mojtaba Esmaeilzadeh 47'; Azwan Saleh 59'; Helmi Zambin 67'; Abdul Aziz Tamit (yellow card) 76'

17 June 2018 Round 13	Home United (Singapore)	2–0	(Singapore) Geylang International	Bishan Stadium
	Amy Recha 47'; Shahril Ishak 89'; Anumanthan Kumar (yellow card) 33'; Shakir Hamzah (yellow card) 51'

24 June 2018 Round 14	Geylang International (Singapore)	0–3	(Singapore) Albirex Niigata (S)	Bedok Stadium
	Fairoz Hasan (yellow card) 45'		Shuhei Sasahara 27'; Wataru Murofushi 48'; Hiroyoshi Kamata 59'	Referee: Muhammad Taqi Aljaafari Bin Jahari (Singapore)

4 July 2018 Round 15	Garena Young Lions (Singapore)	1–3	(Singapore) Geylang International	Jalan Besar Stadium
	Haiqal Pashia 59'; R Aaravin (red card) 67'		Shawal Anuar 38'; Ryan Syaffiq 66'; Fairoz Hasan 70'	Referee: Muhammad Zulfiqar (Singapore)

5 August 2018 Round 16 (Rescheduled)	Geylang International (Singapore)	0–3	(Singapore) Hougang United	Bedok Stadium
	Jasper Chan (red card) 52'; Anders Aplin (yellow card) 52'; Yuki Ichikawa (yellow card) 78'		Justin Hui 36'; Fareez Farhan 64'; Jang Jo-yoon 87'; Syahiran Miswan (yellow card) 45+2'; Illyas Lee (yellow card) 53'	Referee: Jansen Foo (Singapore)

15 July 2018 Round 17	Geylang International (Singapore)	0–1	(Singapore) Warriors FC	Bedok Stadium
	Afiq Yunos (yellow card) 20'; Fairoz Hassan (yellow card) 69'; Anders Aplin (yellow card) 82'; Darren Teh (yellow card) 85'		Jonathan Béhé 10'; Khairul Nizam (red card) 90+4'	Referee: Nathan Chan (Singapore)

21 July 2018 Round 18	Tampines Rovers (Singapore)	4–1	(Singapore) Geylang International	Our Tampines Hub
	Khairul Amri 50' 60' 65' (pen.); Amirul Adli 89'; Daniel Bennett (yellow card) 31'; Zulfadhmi Suzliman (yellow card) 84'		Fairoz Hasan 33' (yellow card) 79'; Faud Ramli (yellow card) 26'; Afiq Yunos (yellow card) 64'	Referee: Muhammad Zulfiqar (Singapore)

1 August 2018 Round 19	Geylang International (Singapore)	1–0	(Singapore) Balestier Khalsa	Bedok Stadium
	Anders Aplin 73'		Dusan Marinkovic (yellow card) 82'

11 August 2018 Round 20	Brunei DPMM	2–2	(Singapore) Geylang International	Hassanal Bolkiah National Stadium
	Adi Said 18'; Brian McLean 43'		Yeo Hai Ngee 5'; Fairoz Hasan 45'

15 August 2018 Round 21	Geylang International (Singapore)	1–5	(Singapore) Home United	Bedok Stadium
	Darren Teh 87'		Faritz Hameed 40'; Shakir Hamzah 27'; Shahril Ishak 56' 61'; Hafiz Nor 58'	Referee: Muhammad Taqi Aljaafari Bin Jahari (Singapore)

18 August 2018 Round 22	Albirex Niigata (S) (Singapore)	4–0	(Singapore) Geylang International	Jurong East Stadium
	Shun Kumagai 8' (yellow card) 42'; Taku Morinaga 65'; Hiroyoshi Kamata 69'; Darren Teh 87' (o.g.); Shuhei Hoshino (penalty missed) 82		Azhar Sairudin (yellow card) 23' (yellow card) 32' (yellow-red card); Yeo Hai Ngee (yellow card) 75'; Ahmad Zaki (yellow card) 42'; Fairoz Hassan (yellow card) 85'; Jufri Taha (yellow card) 90+1'; Danish Irfan (yellow card) 90+4'; Fuad Ramli (red card) 86'	Referee: Y.Sathyakumar (Singapore)

22 September 2018 Round 23	Geylang International (Singapore)	2–2	(Singapore) Garena Young Lions	Bedok Stadium
	Yeo Hai Ngee 49' 57'; Ryan Syaffiq (yellow card) 55'; Fumiya Kogure (yellow card) 85'		R Aaravin 56'; Ikhsan Fandi 90+4'; Jacob Mahler (yellow card) 87'	Referee: Nathan Chan (Singapore)

29 September 2018 Round 24 (Rescheduled)	Hougang United (Singapore)	1–1	(Singapore) Geylang International	Hougang Stadium
	Fabian Kwok 90+4'		Cameron Ayrton Bell 82'	Referee: Jansen Foo (Singapore)

Pos	Team	Pld	W	D	L	GF	GA	GD	Pts
5	Warriors FC	24	7	7	10	32	35	−3	28
6	Balestier Khalsa	24	7	6	11	25	36	−11	27
7	Young Lions (Note: The two foreign clubs – Albirex Niigata (S) and DPMM FC – as well as the Football Association of Singapore (FAS) under-21 team, Young Lions, are ineligible for any AFC competition spots.)	24	5	6	13	25	46	−21	21
8	Geylang International	24	5	5	14	26	57	−31	20
9	Hougang United	24	2	6	16	22	44	−22	12

Updated to match(es) played on 29 September 2018. Source: Singapore Premier League
Rules for classification: 1) points; 2) goal difference; 3) number of goals scored; 4) number of wins

=== Singapore Cup ===
Win Draw Loss

29 August 2018 Quarter Final 1st Leg	Geylang International (Singapore)	0–0	(Singapore) Balestier Khalsa	Bedok Stadium
	Danish Irfan Azman (yellow card) 35'; Azhar Sairudin (yellow card) 48'; Afiq Yunos (yellow card) 50'		Noor Akid Nordin (yellow card) 27' (red card) 58'; Ahmad Syahir (yellow card) 42'	Referee: Nathan Chan (Singapore)

1 September 2018 Quarter Final 2nd Leg	Balestier Khalsa (Singapore)	1–0 (1–0 agg.)	(Singapore) Geylang International	Toa Payoh Stadium
	Hazzuwan Halim 85' (pen.)			Referee: W. Ravisanthiran (Singapore)

Geylang International lost 1–0 on aggregate.
