= 2016 Geylang International FC season =

Geylang International FC
2016 season
- Chairman: (Singapore) Ben Teng
- Coach: (Singapore) Hasrin Jailani
- Ground: Bedok Stadium
- S.League: 6th
- Singapore Cup: Quarter-finals
- League Cup: Group Stage

The 2016 S.League season was Geylang International's 21st season in the top flight of Singapore football and 42nd year in existence as a football club. The club also competed in the Singapore League Cup and the Singapore Cup.

== Squad ==
No.	Name	Nationality	Position (s)	Date of birth (age)	Last club
Goalkeepers
1	Hairul Syirhan	(Singapore)	GK	21 August 1995 (age 31)	Youth Team
12	Russell Santa Maria	(Singapore) (Philippines)	GK	24 October 1996 (age 29)	Singapore Cubs
24	Syazwan Buhari	(Singapore)	GK	22 September 1992 (age 34)	(Singapore) Young Lions FC
Defenders
2	Anders Eric Aplin	(Singapore)	DF	21 June 1991 (age 35)	Singapore Recreation Club
3	Yuki Ichikawa	(Japan)	DF	29 August 1987 (age 39)	(Singapore) Albirex Niigata (S)
4	Isa Halim	(Singapore)	DF	15 May 1986 (age 40)	(Singapore) Tampines Rovers
5	Shariff Abdul Samat	(Singapore)	DF	5 January 1984 (age 42)	(Singapore) Tampines Rovers
6	Dhukhilan s/o Jeevamani	(Singapore)	DF	24 March 1994 (age 32)	(Singapore) Young Lions FC
8	Daniel Bennett	(Singapore)	DF	7 January 1978 (age 48)	(Singapore) Warriors FC
9	Faritz Abdul Hameed	(Singapore)	DF	16 January 1990 (age 36)	(Singapore) LionsXII
18	Al-Qaasimy Rahman	(Singapore)	DF	21 January 1992 (age 34)	(Singapore) LionsXII
Midfielders
7	Gabriel Quak	(Singapore)	MF	22 December 1990 (age 35)	(Singapore) LionsXII
11	Safirul Sulaiman	(Singapore)	MF	12 October 1992 (age 33)	(Singapore) Young Lions FC
14	Stanely Ng	(Singapore)	MF	27 May 1992 (age 34)	(Singapore) Home United
19	Carlos Alberto Delgado	(Argentina)	MF	3 January 1986 (age 40)	(Singapore) Hougang United
20	Nor Azli Yusoff	(Singapore)	MF	17 March 1986 (age 40)	(Singapore) Tanjong Pagar United
22	Taufiq Ghani	(Singapore)	MF	19 November 1989 (age 36)	(Singapore) Hougang United
25	Brandon Koh	(Singapore)	MF	22 April 1995 (age 31)	Youth Team
Forwards
10	Shahfiq Ghani	(Singapore)	FW	17 March 1992 (age 34)	(Singapore) Young Lions FC
13	Indra Sahdan Daud	(Singapore)	FW	5 March 1979 (age 47)	(Singapore) Tampines Rovers
16	Mark Hartmann	(Philippines) (England)	FW	20 January 1992 (age 34)	(Philippines) Global FC
17	Amy Recha	(Singapore)	FW	13 May 1992 (age 34)	(Singapore) Young Lions FC
21	Shawal Anuar	(Singapore)	FW	29 April 1991 (age 35)	(Singapore) Keppel Monaco FC
23	Sahil Suhaimi	(Singapore)	FW	8 July 1992 (age 34)	(Singapore) LionsXII
Players who left during the club
15	Branko Čubrilo	(Croatia)	FW	20 May 1988 (age 38)	(Croatia) BŠK Zmaj

== Coaching staff ==
Position	Name	Ref.
Head coach	(Singapore) Hasrin Jailani	
Assistant coach	(Singapore) Mohd Noor Ali	
Goalkeeping coach	(Thailand) Sarong Naiket	
Team manager	(Singapore) Aizat Ramli	
Physiotherapist	(Singapore)	
Kitman	(Singapore) Leonard Koh	

== Pre-Season Transfers ==
=== In ===
Position	Player	Transferred from	Ref
DF	(Singapore) Faritz Abdul Hameed	(Singapore) LionsXII	
GK	(Singapore) Russell Santa Maria	(Singapore) Geylang International U21	
GK	(Singapore) Syazwan Buhari	(Singapore) Courts Young Lions	
DF	(Singapore) Anders Eric Aplin	Singapore Recreation Club	
DF	(Singapore) Isa Halim	(Singapore) Tampines Rovers	
DF	(Singapore) Shariff Abdul Samat	Singapore Recreation Club	
DF	(Singapore) Dhukhilan s/o Jeevamani	(Singapore) Geylang International U21	
DF	(Singapore) Daniel Bennett	(Singapore) Warriors FC	
DF	(Singapore) Al-Qaasimy Rahman	(Singapore) Courts Young Lions	
MF	(Singapore) Gabriel Quak	(Singapore) LionsXII	
MF	(Singapore) Safirul Sulaiman	(Singapore) Courts Young Lions	
MF	(Singapore) Stanely Ng	(Singapore) Home United	
MF	(Argentina) Carlos Delgado	(Singapore) Hougang United	
MF	(Singapore) Taufiq Ghani	(Singapore) Hougang United	
MF	(Singapore) Brandon Koh	(Singapore) Geylang International U21	
FW	(Singapore) Shahfiq Ghani	(Singapore) Courts Young Lions	
FW	(Singapore) Indra Sahdan Daud	(Singapore) Tampines Rovers	
FW	(Croatia) Branko Čubrilo	Free transfer	
FW	(Singapore) Amy Recha	(Singapore) Courts Young Lions	
FW	(Singapore) Sahil Suhaimi	(Singapore) LionsXII	

=== Out ===
Position	Player	Transferred To	Ref
DF	(Singapore) Khairulnizam Jumahat	(Singapore) Hougang United	
DF	(Singapore) Anaz Hadee	Released	
DF	(Singapore) Syed Thaha	Retired	
MF	(Japan) Tatsuro Inui	(Japan) Albirex Niigata (S)	
GK	(Singapore) Farhan Amin	Retired	
MF	(Singapore) Huzaifah Aziz	(Singapore) Hougang United	
FW	(Slovakia) Jozef Kapláň	(Singapore) Hougang United	
GK	(Singapore) Yazid Yasin	(Singapore) Warriors FC	
FW	(Brazil) Bruno Castanheira	(Japan) F.C. Gifu	
DF	(Singapore) Sevki Sha'ban	Retired	
DF	(Singapore) Hafiz Osman	(Singapore) Warriors FC	
DF	(Japan) Kento Fukuda	(Singapore) Warriors FC	
MF	(Singapore) Mustaqim Manzur	Retired	
MF	(Singapore) Hafiz Nor	(Singapore) Warriors FC	
MF	(Singapore) Shah Hirul	(Singapore) Balestier Khalsa	

== Pre-season Friendlies ==
15 January 2016 Pre-Season Friendly	Geylang International (Singapore)	9–0	(Singapore) Jungfrau Punggol	Jalan Besar Stadium
17:00 GMT+8

20 January 2016 Pre-Season Friendly	Police SA (Singapore)	0–6	(Singapore) Geylang International	Jurong Stadium
19:30 GMT+8

26 January 2016 Pre-Season Friendly	Johor Darul Takzim (Malaysia)	2–1	(Singapore) Geylang International	Larkin Stadium
20:45 GMT+8

3 February 2016 Pre-Season Friendly	Geylang International (Singapore)	6–0	(Singapore) Happy Feet FC	Bedok Stadium
17:00 GMT+8

6 February 2016 Pre-Season Friendly	Geylang International (Singapore)	8–0	Singapore Cricket Club	Bedok Stadium
17:00 GMT+8

== Competition ==
=== S.League ===
==== Round 1 ====
15 February 2016 1	Tampines Rovers (Singapore)	3–3	(Singapore) Geylang International	Jurong West Stadium
19:30 GMT+8	Jordan Webb 13'; Shakir Hamzah (yellow card) 29'; Billy Mehmet 34'; Noh Rahman (yellow card) 59' (red card); Yasir Hanapi 86' (yellow card) 89' (red card)	Report	Amy Recha 35'; Carlos Alberto Delgado 55'; Nor Azli (yellow card) 65'; Stanely Ng 79'; Taufiq Ghani (yellow card) 83'	Attendance: 2,930; Referee: Sukhbir Singh

20 February 2016 2	Geylang International (Singapore)	1–1	Brunei DPMM	Bedok Stadium
19:30 GMT+8	Yuki Ichikawa (yellow card) 20'; Stanely Ng (yellow card) 25'; Branko Cubrilo (yellow card) 45'; Amy Recha (yellow card) 70' (red card); Sahil Suhaimi 76'; Al-Qaasimy Rahman (yellow card) 89'	Report	Rafael Ramazotti 77'	Attendance: 2,000; Referee: Muhd Taqi

25 February 2016 3	Garena Young Lions (Singapore)	0–2	(Singapore) Geylang International	Jalan Besar Stadium
19:30 GMT+8	Firdaus Kasman (yellow card) 37'; Adam Swandi (yellow card) 56'	Report	Branko Čubrilo 15'; Faritz Hameed 66'; Stanely Ng (yellow card) 84'	Attendance: 2,416; Referee: Nathan Chan

3 March 2016 4	Geylang International (Singapore)	0–0	(Singapore) Balestier Khalsa	Bedok Stadium
19:30 GMT+8	Safirul Sulaiman (yellow card) 26'; Branko Cubrilo (yellow card) 40'; Shariff Samat (yellow card) 86'	Report	Fazli Ayob (yellow card) 25'	Attendance: 1,811; Referee: Jansen Foo

10 March 2016 5	Geylang International (Singapore)	0–0	(Japan) Albirex Niigata (S)	Bedok Stadium
19:30 GMT+8	Sahil Suhaimi (yellow card) 55'; Shawal Anuar (yellow card) 90'	Report	Tomoki Menda (yellow card) 90'	Attendance: 2,139; Referee: Sukhbir Singh

1 April 2016 6	Geylang International (Singapore)	2–2	(Singapore) Warriors	Jalan Besar Stadium
19:45 GMT+8	Branko Čubrilo (yellow card) 4'; Al-Qaasimy Rahman (yellow card) 31'; Faritz Hameed (yellow card) 43'; Gabriel Quak 50'; Carlos Delgado 86' (yellow card) 86'	Report	Jonathan Béhé 16'; Syaqir Sulaiman (yellow card) 24'; Zulfadli Zainal Abidin (yellow card) 45'; Emmeric Ong (yellow card) 79'; Ridhuan Muhammad 89'	Attendance: 1,854; Referee: Farhad Mohd

7 April 2016 7	Hougang United (Singapore)	3–1	(Singapore) Geylang International	Hougang Stadium
19:30 GMT+8	Nurhilmi Jasni (yellow card) 35'; Stipe Plazibat 54' (pen.); Faiz Salleh 60'; Raihan Rahman 88'	Report	Carlos Delgado 15' (pen.); Stanely Ng (yellow card) 58'; Gabriel Quak (yellow card) 65'	Attendance: 1,537; Referee: Sukhbir Singh

15 April 2016 8	Geylang International (Singapore)	2–2	(Singapore) Home United	Jalan Besar Stadium
19:45 GMT+8	Stanely Ng 24'; Amy Recha 46'	Report	Ken Ilsø 15'; Al-Qaasimy Rahman 39' (o.g.); Abdil Qaiyyim (yellow card) 87'	Attendance: 2,035; Referee: Jansen Foo

==== Round 2 ====
21 April 2016 9	Geylang International (Singapore)	0–1	(Singapore) Tampines Rovers	Bedok Stadium
19:30 GMT+8	Safirul Sulaiman (yellow card) 32'; Shawal Anuar (yellow card) 73'; Carlos Delgado (yellow card) 77'; Al-Qaasimy Rahman (yellow card) 85'	Report	Yasir Hanapi 28'; Izzdin Shafiq (yellow card) 67'; Fahrudin Mustafić (yellow card) 71'; Jermaine Pennant (yellow card) 85'	Attendance: 2,369; Referee: G. Letchman

30 April 2016 10	Brunei DPMM	1–2	(Singapore) Geylang International	Sultan Hassanal Bolkiah Stadium
20:15 GMT+8	Helmi Zambin (yellow card) 31'; Rafael Ramazotti 66' (pen.)	Report	Shawal Anuar 30'; Branko Čubrilo (yellow card) 56'; Faritz Hameed (yellow card) 65' (goal) 87'; Shariff Samat (yellow card) 77'; Daniel Bennett (yellow card) 78'	Referee: Ahmad A'Qashah

5 May 2016 11	Geylang International (Singapore)	3–1	(Singapore) Garena Young Lions	Bedok Stadium
19:30 GMT+8	Carlos Delgado 3' (pen.); Yuki Ichikawa 74'; Stanely Ng (yellow card) 77'; Gabriel Quak 88'	Report	Fareez Farhan 52' (pen.); Joshua Bernard Pereira (yellow card) 70'; Taufiq Muqminin (yellow card) 79'	Attendance: 1,331; Referee: G. Letchman

14 May 2016 12	Balestier Khalsa (Singapore)	1–3	(Singapore) Geylang International	Toa Payoh Stadium
19:30 GMT+8

20 May 2016 13	Albirex Niigata (S) (Japan)	2–0	(Singapore) Geylang International	Jalan Besar Stadium
19:45 GMT+8

15 June 2016 14	Warriors (Singapore)	2–0	(Singapore) Geylang International	Choa Chu Kang Stadium
20:00 GMT+8

18 June 2016 15	Geylang International (Singapore)	1–2	(Singapore) Hougang United	Bedok Stadium
20:00 GMT+8

24 June 2016 16	Home United (Singapore)	1–2	(Singapore) Geylang International	Jalan Besar Stadium
20:00 GMT+8

==== Round 3 ====
4 August 2016 17	Tampines Rovers (Singapore)	2–1	(Singapore) Geylang International	Jurong West Stadium
19:30 GMT+8	Jordan Webb 21'; Billy Mehmet 40'		Mark Hartmann 42'	Referee: W. Ravisanthiran

11 August 2016 18	Geylang International (Singapore)	1–1	Brunei DPMM	Bedok Stadium
19:30 GMT+8	Roberto Camarasa 5'		Azwan Ali Rahman 70'

18 August 2016 19	Garena Young Lions (Singapore)	0–2	(Singapore) Geylang International	Jalan Besar Stadium
19:30 GMT+8			Fashah Iskandar 50' (o.g.); Stanley Ng 82'	Referee: W. Ravisanthiran

25 August 2016 20	Geylang International (Singapore)	2–1	(Singapore) Balestier Khalsa	Bedok Stadium
19:30 GMT+8	Mark Hartmann 45'; Sahil Suhaimi 90'		Niko Tokić 42' (pen.)	Referee: Nathan Chan

22 September 2016 21	Albirex Niigata (S) (Singapore)	1–0	(Japan) Geylang International	Jurong East Stadium
19:30 GMT+8	Atsushi Shirota 76'			Referee: W. Ravisanthiran

14 October 2016 22	Geylang International (Singapore)	2–1	(Singapore) Warriors	Jalan Besar Stadium
19:30 GMT+8	Amy Recha 73'; Sahil Suhaimi 76'		Fazli Jaffar 52'	Referee: Sukhbir Singh

20 October 2016 23	Hougang United (Singapore)	0–1	(Singapore) Geylang International	Hougang Stadium
19:30 GMT+8			Sahil Suhaimi 43'	Referee: G. Letchman

27 October 2016 24	Geylang International (Singapore)	4–1	(Singapore) Home United	Jalan Besar Stadium
19:30 GMT+8	Mark Hartmann 6'; Shafiq Ghani 68'; Gabriel Quak 83'; Daniel Bennett 90'		Ken Ilsø 50'	Referee: Jansen Foo

Pos	Team	Pld	W	D	L	GF	GA	GD	Pts	Qualification
3	(Brunei) DPMM FC (Note: The two foreign clubs – Albirex Niigata (S) and DPMM FC – as well as the Football Association of Singapore (FAS) under-21 team, Young Lions, are not eligible for any AFC competition spots.)	24	12	5	7	47	37	+10	41	
4	Home United	24	11	4	9	50	42	+8	37	Qualification to AFC Cup Play-off Round
5	Geylang International	24	10	7	7	35	29	+6	37	
6	Hougang United	24	9	5	10	35	39	−4	32	
7	Warriors FC	24	7	7	10	39	39	0	28	

Updated to match(es) played on 31 October 2016. Source: S.League
Rules for classification: 1) points; 2) goal difference; 3) number of goals scored; 4) number of wins

=== Singapore Cup ===
28 May 2016 Preliminary Round	Geylang International (Singapore)	2–1	(Singapore) Warriors	Jalan Besar Stadium
19:45 GMT+8

28 June 2016 Quarter Finals	Albirex Niigata Singapore (Japan)	2–0	(Singapore) Geylang International	Jurong East Stadium
19:30 GMT+8	Masaya Jitozono 1'; Kento Nagasaki 53'			Referee: G. Letchman

1 July 2016 Quarter Finals	Geylang International (Singapore)	2–2	(Japan) Albirex Niigata Singapore	Bedok Stadium
19:30 GMT+8	Gabriel Quak 23'; Sahil Suhaimi 45'		Atsushi Kawata 65' 77' (pen.)	Referee: Sukhbir Singh

Geylang International lost 2–4 on aggregate.

=== Singapore TNP League Cup ===
Pos	Team	Pld	W	D	L	GF	GA	GD	Pts	Qualification
1	Albirex Niigata (S)	3	2	0	1	4	1	+3	6	Advance to semi-final
2	Home United	3	1	1	1	7	4	+3	4	Advance to semi-final
3	Geylang International	3	1	1	1	3	7	−4	4	
4	Balestier Khalsa	3	0	2	1	4	6	−2	2	

Source: S.League

14 July 2016	Balestier Khalsa	2–2	Geylang International	Toa Payoh Stadium, Singapore
19:30 UTC+8	Tokić 9'; Fadhil 22'	Details	Hartmann 54', 90'	Referee: Ahmad A'Qashah

18 July 2016	Geylang International	0–5	Home United	Bedok Stadium, Singapore
19:30 UTC+8		Details	Shamil 21', 65'; Ilsø 44', 61'; Yeo 90'	Referee: Sukhbir Singh

22 July 2016	Geylang International	1–0	(Japan) Albirex Niigata (S)	Bedok Stadium, Singapore
19:45 UTC+8	Shawal Anuar 34'	Details		Referee: Muhd Taqi

== Team statistics ==
=== Appearances ===
- Numbers in parentheses denote appearances as substitute.

No.	Pos.	Player	Sleague		Singapore Cup		League Cup		Total	
No.	Pos.	Player	Apps.	Goals	Apps.	Goals	Apps.	Goals	Apps.	Goals
1	GK	(Singapore) Hairul Syirhan	0	0	0	0	0	0	0	0
2	DF	(Singapore) Anders Eric Aplin	9	0	0	0	4	0	13	0
3	DF	(Japan) Yuki Ichikawa	23	1	3	0	5	0	31	1
4	DF	(Singapore) Isa Halim	17	0	1	0	5	0	23	0
5	DF	(Singapore) Shariff Abdul Samat	18	0	2	0	4	0	24	0
6	DF	(Singapore) Dhukhilan s/o Jeevamani	0	0	0	0	0	0	0	0
7	MF	(Singapore) Gabriel Quak	23	4	3	0	0	0	26	4
8	DF	(Singapore) Daniel Bennett	22	1	3	0	0	0	25	1
9	DF	(Singapore) Faritz Abdul Hameed	22	2	3	1	0	0	25	3
10	FW	(Singapore) Shahfiq Ghani	6	1	0	0	1	0	7	1
11	MF	(Singapore) Safirul Sulaiman	16	0	3	0	0	0	19	3
12	GK	(Singapore) Russell Santa Maria	0	0	0	0	0	0	0	0
13	FW	(Singapore) Indra Sahdan Daud	5	0	0	0	3	0	8	0
14	MF	(Singapore) Stanely Ng	20	3	2	0	4	0	26	0
16	FW	(Philippines) Mark Hartmann	5	3	2	1	5	4	12	8
17	FW	(Singapore) Amy Recha	17	4	0	0	0	0	17	4
18	DF	(Singapore) Al-Qaasimy Rahman	14	0	3	0	4	0	21	0
19	MF	(Argentina) Carlos Delgado	20	5	3	0	2	0	25	5
20	MF	(Singapore) Nor Azli Yusof	17	0	3	0	4	0	24	0
21	FW	(Singapore) Shawal Anuar	18	1	3	0	5	2	26	3
22	MF	(Singapore) Taufiq Ghani	3	0	0	0	4	0	7	0
23	FW	(Singapore) Sahil Suhaimi	21	5	3	0	0	0	24	5
24	GK	(Singapore) Syazwan Buhari	24	0	3	0	5	0	32	0
25	MF	(Singapore) Brandon Koh	2	0	0	0	0	0	2	0
27	MF	(Singapore) Farish Khan	0	0	0	0	1	0	1	0
28	MF	(Spain) Roberto Camarasa	3	1	0	0	3	0	6	1
32	FW	(Singapore) Ifwat Ismail	0	0	0	0	1	0	1	0
34	MF	(Singapore) Umar Akhbar	0	0	0	0	5	0	5	0
35	FW	(Singapore) Prince Julien Jean Marie	0	0	0	0	1	0	1	0
37	MF	(Singapore) Hairy Jamal	0	0	0	0	1	0	1	0
41	MF	(Singapore) Noor Ariff	0	0	0	0	0	0	0	0
42	MF	(Singapore) J.Balakrishnan	0	0	0	0	3	0	3	0
Players who have played this season but had left the club or on loan to other club
15	FW	(Croatia) Branko Čubrilo	11	3	1	0	0	0	0	0

=== Goalscorers ===
Rank	Pos.	No.	Player	S.League	League Cup	Singapore Cup	Total
1	FW	17	(Singapore) Amy Recha	1	0	0	1
1	MF	19	(Argentina) Carlos Delgado	1	0	0	1
1	MF	14	(Singapore) Stanely Ng	1	0	0	1
1	FW	23	(Singapore) Sahil Suhaimi	1	0	0	1
1	DF	15	(Croatia) Branko Čubrilo	1	0	0	1
1	DF	9	(Singapore) Faritz Abdul Hameed	1	0	0	1
TOTALS				6	0	0	6

=== Disciplinary record ===
No.	Pos.	Name	S.League		League Cup		Singapore Cup		Total	
No.	Pos.	Name	Booked	Sent off (straight red)	Booked	Sent off (straight red)	Booked	Sent off (straight red)	Booked	Sent off (straight red)
1	GK	(Singapore) Hairul Syirhan	0	0	0	0	0	0	0	0
2	DF	(Singapore) Anders Eric Aplin	0	0	0	0	0	0	0	0
3	DF	(Japan) Yuki Ichikawa	1	0	0	0	0	0	1	0
4	DF	(Singapore) Isa Halim	0	0	0	0	0	0	0	0
5	DF	(Japan) Shariff Abdul Samat	1	0	0	0	0	0	1	0
6	DF	(Singapore) Dhukhilan s/o Jeevamani	0	0	0	0	0	0	0	0
7	MF	(Singapore) Gabriel Quak	0	0	0	0	0	0	0	0
8	DF	(Singapore) Daniel Bennett	0	0	0	0	0	0	0	0
9	DF	(Singapore) Faritz Abdul Hameed	0	0	0	0	0	0	0	0
10	FW	(Singapore) Shahfiq Ghani	0	0	0	0	0	0	0	0
11	MF	(Singapore) Safirul Sulaiman	1	0	0	0	0	0	1	0
12	GK	(Singapore) Russell Santa Maria	0	0	0	0	0	0	0	0
13	FW	(Singapore) Indra Sahdan Daud	0	0	0	0	0	0	0	0
14	MF	(Singapore) Stanely Ng	2	0	0	0	0	0	2	0
15	FW	(Croatia) Branko Čubrilo	2	0	0	0	0	0	2	0
17	FW	(Singapore) Amy Recha	0	1	0	0	0	0	0	1
18	DF	(Singapore) Al-Qaasimy Rahman	1	0	0	0	0	0	1	0
19	MF	(Argentina) Carlos Delgado	0	0	0	0	0	0	0	0
20	MF	(Singapore) Nor Azli Yusoff	1	0	0	0	0	0	1	0
21	FW	(Singapore) Shawal Anuar	1	0	0	0	0	0	1	0
22	MF	(Singapore) Taufiq Ghani	1	0	0	0	0	0	1	0
23	FW	(Singapore) Sahil Suhaimi	1	0	0	0	0	0	1	0
24	GK	(Singapore) Syazwan Buhari	0	0	0	0	0	0	0	0
25	MF	(Singapore) Brandon Koh	0	0	0	0	0	0	0	0
