= 2021 Hougang United FC season =

Hougang United
2021 season
- Chairman: Bill Ng
- Head coach: Clement Teo
- Stadium: Hougang Stadium
Home colours	Away colours

The 2021 season was Hougang United's 24th consecutive season in the top flight of Singapore football and in the S.League. Along with the S.League, the club will also compete in the Singapore Cup.

== Squad ==
=== Singapore Premier League ===
No.	Name	Nationality	Date of birth (age)	Previous club	Contract since	Contract end
Goalkeepers
1	Mukundan Maran ^{U23}	(Singapore)	21 July 1998 (age 28)	(Singapore) Warriors FC	2021	2021
13	Ridhuan Barudin ^{>30}	(Singapore)	23 March 1987 (age 39)	(Singapore) Tampines Rovers	2015	2021
25	Aizil Yazid ^{U23}	(Singapore)	24 December 2004 (age 21)	(Singapore) Albirex Niigata (S)	2021	2021
30	Izwan Mahbud ^{>30}	(Singapore)	14 July 1990 (age 36)	(Thailand) Samut Prakan City F.C.	2021	2021
Defenders
2	Anders Aplin	(Singapore) (England)	21 June 1991 (age 35)	(Singapore) Geylang International	2020	2021
5	Lionel Tan	(Singapore)	5 June 1997 (age 29)	(Singapore) SAFSA (NFL)	2020	2021
8	Hafiz Sujad ^{>30}	(Singapore)	1 November 1990 (age 36)	(Singapore) Tampines Rovers	2019	2021
11	Nazrul Nazari	(Singapore)	11 February 1991 (age 35)	(Singapore) LionsXII	2016	2021
14	Maksat Dzhakybaliev	(Kyrgyzstan)	18 February 2000 (age 26)	(Turkey) Sivasspor U-21	2020	2021
16	Faiz Salleh	(Singapore)	17 July 1992 (age 34)	(Singapore) Young Lions FC	2014	2021
20	Muhaimin Suhaimi	(Singapore)	20 February 1995 (age 31)	(Singapore) Young Lions FC	2018	2021
26	Kishon Philip ^{U23}	(Singapore)	26 November 1999 (age 26)	Youth Team	2021	2021
Midfielders
4	Afiq Noor	(Singapore)	25 December 1993 (age 32)	(Singapore) Tiong Bahru FC (NFL)	2019	2021
6	Kaishu Yamazaki	(Japan)	12 July 1997 (age 29)	(Singapore) Lion City Sailors	2021	2021
12	Fabian Kwok (Captain) ^{>30}	(Singapore)	17 March 1989 (age 37)	(Singapore) Tampines Rovers	2017	2021
15	Farhan Zulkifli ^{U23}	(Singapore)	10 November 2002 (age 24)	(Singapore) Home United U19	2019	2021
18	Idraki Adnan ^{U23}	(Singapore)	13 March 1999 (age 27)	(Singapore) Young Lions FC	2021	2021
21	Nikesh Singh Sidhu ^{U23}	(Singapore)	24 February 1999 (age 27)	(Singapore) Home United U19	2019	2021
24	Naufal Azman ^{U23}	(Singapore)	10 July 1998 (age 28)	(Singapore) Young Lions FC	2020	2021
	Zulfahmi Arifin	(Singapore)	5 October 1991 (age 35)	(Thailand) Suphanburi F.C.	2021	2021
Strikers
7	Shahfiq Ghani	(Singapore)	17 March 1992 (age 34)	(Singapore) Geylang International	2018	2021
9	Tomoyuki Doi	(Japan)	24 September 1997 (age 29)	(Singapore) Albirex Niigata (S)	2021	2021
10	Shawal Anuar	(Singapore)	29 April 1991 (age 35)	(Singapore) Geylang International	2020	2021
17	Shahril Ishak ^{>30}	(Singapore)	23 January 1984 (age 42)	(Singapore) Warriors FC	2021	2021
19	Gilberto Fortunato	(Brazil)	7 November 1987 (age 39)	(Kosovo) FC Drita	2021	2021
22	Khairul Nizam	(Singapore)	25 June 1991 (age 35)	(Singapore) Geylang International	2021	2021
23	Sahil Suhaimi	(Singapore)	8 July 1992 (age 34)	(Singapore) Warriors FC	2020	2021
29	Amir Zalani	(Singapore)	4 December 1996 (age 29)	(Singapore) Home United	2021	2021
Players who left during the season
3	Afiq Yunos ^{>30}	(Singapore)	10 December 1990 (age 35)	(Thailand) Trat F.C.	2019	2021

== Coaching staff ==
Position	Name	Ref.
General Manager	(Singapore) Matthew Tay	
Head Coach	(Singapore) Clement Teo	
Assistant Coach	(Singapore) Firdaus Kassim	
Goalkeeping Coach	(Australia) Scott Starr	
Head of Youth (COE)	(Singapore) Han Yiguang	
Fitness Coach	(Singapore) Hairil Amin	
Team Manager	(Singapore) (Nigeria) Robert Eziakor	
Marketing Media	(Singapore) Liu Jueming	
Sports Trainer	(Singapore) Thomas Pang	
Sports Trainer	(Singapore) Ryan Wang	
Kitman	(Singapore) Wan Azlan	

== Transfers ==
=== In ===
Preseason

Position	Player	Transferred From	Ref
GK	(Singapore) Mukundan Maran	Free Agent	Free
GK	(Singapore) Aizil Yazid	(Singapore) Albirex Niigata (S)	Free
DF	(Japan) Kaishu Yamazaki	(Singapore) Lion City Sailors	Free
DF	(Singapore) Kishson Philip	(Singapore)	End of NS
FW	(Singapore) Khairul Nizam	(Singapore) Geylang International	Free
FW	(Singapore) Shahril Ishak	(Singapore) Lion City Sailors	Free
FW	(Brazil) Gilberto Fortunato	(Kosovo) FC Drita	Free
FW	(Japan) Tomoyuki Doi	(Singapore) Albirex Niigata (S)	Free
MF	(Singapore) Firas Irwan	Free Agent	NA

Mid-season

Position	Player	Transferred From	Ref
GK	(Singapore) Izwan Mahbud	(Thailand) Samut Prakan City F.C.	
FW	(Singapore) Amir Zalani	Free Agent	

=== Loan Return ===
Preseason

Position	Player	Transferred From	Ref
DF	(Singapore) Asraf Zahid	(Singapore) Young Lions FC	Loan Return
DF	(Singapore) Sahffee Jubpre	(Singapore) Young Lions FC	Loan Return
DF	(Singapore) (Wales) Harhys Stewart	(Singapore) Young Lions FC	Loan Return
MF	(Singapore) Nor Hakim Redzuan	(Singapore) Young Lions FC	Loan Return
MF	(Singapore) Zulfahmi Arifin	(Thailand) Suphanburi F.C.	Loan Return
FW	(Singapore) Idraki Adnan	(Singapore) Young Lions FC	Loan Return

Note 1: Zulfahmi Arifin loan to Suphanburi was cancelled before moving to Samut Prakan City on loan.

Note 2: Harhys Stewart loan to Young Lions was extended for another season.

Note 3: Sahffee Jubpre loan to Young Lions was extended for another season.

Note 4: Asraf Zahid left the club after returning to the club.

Mid-season

Position	Player	Transferred From	Ref
MF	(Singapore) Zulfahmi Arifin	(Thailand) Samut Prakan City F.C.	Loan Return

Note 1: Zulfahmi Arifin loan to Samut Prakan City was terminated before the agreed date, May 2022.

=== Out ===
Preseason

Position	Player	Transferred To	Ref
DF	(Singapore) Jordan Vestering	(Singapore) SAFSA	NS till 2022
GK	(Singapore) Heng How Meng	(Singapore) SAFSA	NS till 2022
GK	(Singapore) Khairulhin Khalid	(Singapore)	
GK	(Singapore) Daniel Ong	Singapore U19	Goalkeeper Coach
DF	(Singapore) Alif Iskandar	(Singapore) Young Lions FC	Free
DF	(Singapore) Emmeric Ong	(Singapore) Tanjong Pagar United	Free
DF	(Australia) Zachary Anderson	(Australia) Olympic FC	Free
MF	(England) Charlie Machell	(Cambodia) Visakha FC	Free
MF	(Singapore) Anumanthan Kumar	(Malaysia) Kedah FA	Free
MF	(Singapore) Mahathir Azeman	(Singapore)	Free
MF	(Singapore) Justin Hui	(Singapore) Lion City Sailors	Free
FW	(Singapore) Daniel Martens	(Singapore) Tanjong Pagar United	Free
DF	(Singapore) Asraf Zahid	(Singapore)	Free

Note 1: Zulfahmi Arifin loan to Suphanburi was cancelled before moving to Samut Prakan City on loan till May 2022 .

Mid-season

Position	Player	Transferred To	Ref
DF	(Singapore) Afiq Yunos	(Singapore) Geylang International	Free, 6 months contract

=== Loan out ===
Preseason

Position	Player	Transferred To	Ref
MF	(Singapore) Zulfahmi Arifin	(Thailand) Suphanburi F.C.	Season loan till May 2021
MF	(Singapore) Zulfahmi Arifin	(Thailand) Samut Prakan City F.C.	Season loan till May 2022
DF	(Singapore) (Wales) Harhys Stewart	(Singapore) Young Lions FC	Season loan
DF	(Singapore) Sahffee Jubpre	(Singapore) Young Lions FC	Season loan
MF	(Singapore) Nor Hakim Redzuan	(Singapore) Young Lions FC	Season loan

Mid-season

Position	Player	Transferred To	Ref
MF	(Singapore) Zulfahmi Arifin	(Thailand) Sukhothai F.C.	Season loan till May 2022

=== Retained / Extension ===
Position	Player	Ref
Coach	(Singapore) Clement Teo	
GK	(Singapore) Ridhuan Barudin	
DF	(Singapore) Nazrul Nazari	2 years contract signed in 2019
DF	(Singapore) Muhaimin Suhaimi	2 years contract signed in 2019
DF	(Singapore) Anders Aplin	
DF	(Singapore) Lionel Tan	
DF	(Singapore) Hafiz Sujad	
DF	(Singapore) Faiz Salleh	
DF	(Kyrgyzstan) Maksat Dzhakybaliev	
DF	(Singapore) Afiq Yunos	
MF	(Singapore) Afiq Noor	
MF	(Singapore) Fabian Kwok	
MF	(Singapore) Farhan Zulkifli	
MF	(Singapore) Nikesh Singh Sidhu	
FW	(Singapore) Shahfiq Ghani	2 years contract signed in 2019
FW	(Singapore) Shawal Anuar	2 years contract signed in 2019
FW	(Singapore) Sahil Suhaimi	
FW	(Singapore) Naufal Azman	

== Friendlies ==
=== Pre-Season Friendly ===
Win Draw Loss

5 March 2021	Tampines Rovers (Singapore)	6–1	(Singapore) Hougang United	Singapore
	Yasir Hanapi; Armin Bosnjak; Taufik Suparno; Kyoga Nakamura			Stadium: Our Tampines Hub

=== Mid-season friendlies ===
Win Draw Loss

8 June 2021 1	Geylang International (Singapore)	2–3	(Singapore) Hougang United	Our Tampines Hub
	Asshukrie Wahid; Moresche		Gilberto Fortunato (pen.); Shahril Ishak; Tomoyuki Doi	Attendance: 0 (Note: Due to Covid 19, this match is played behind closed door.)

4 July 2021 2	Hougang United (Singapore)	1–1	(Singapore) Young Lions FC	Jalan Besar Stadium
	Goal		Harhys Stewart	Attendance: 0

10 July 2021 3	Albirex Niigata (S) (Singapore)	v	(Singapore) Hougang United	Jurong East Stadium
				Attendance: 0 (Note: Due to the COVID-19 pandemic, this match was played behind closed doors.)

16 July 2021 4	Albirex Niigata (S) (Singapore)	v	(Singapore) Hougang United	Jurong East Stadium
				Attendance: 0

== Team statistics ==
=== Appearances and goals ===
As of 13 Aug 2021

No.	Pos.	Player	Sleague		Total	
No.	Pos.	Player	Apps.	Goals	Apps.	Goals
1	GK	(Singapore) Mukundan Maran	4	0	4	0
2	DF	(Singapore) (England) Anders Aplin	11+3	1	14	1
4	MF	(Singapore) Afiq Noor	3+11	1	14	1
5	DF	(Singapore) Lionel Tan	18	3	18	3
6	DF	(Japan) Kaishu Yamazaki	20	1	20	1
7	FW	(Singapore) Shahfiq Ghani	3+8	1	11	1
8	DF	(Singapore) Hafiz Sujad	7+7	4	14	4
9	FW	(Japan) Tomoyuki Doi	18+2	19	20	19
10	FW	(Singapore) Shawal Anuar	12+6	3	18	3
11	DF	(Singapore) Nazrul Nazari	9+3	1	12	1
12	MF	(Singapore) Fabian Kwok	15+3	2	18	2
13	GK	(Singapore) Ridhuan Barudin	7	0	7	0
14	DF	(Kyrgyzstan) Maksat Dzhakybaliev	14	1	14	1
15	MF	(Singapore) Farhan Zulkifli	20	0	20	0
16	DF	(Singapore) Faiz Salleh	6	0	6	0
17	FW	(Singapore) Shahril Ishak	1+7	0	8	0
18	MF	(Singapore) Idraki Adnan	12	4	12	4
19	FW	(Brazil) Gilberto Fortunato	8+3	4	11	4
20	DF	(Singapore) Muhaimin Suhaimi	2+4	0	6	0
22	FW	(Singapore) Khairul Nizam	2+4	0	6	0
23	FW	(Singapore) Sahil Suhaimi	0	0	0	0
24	FW	(Singapore) Naufal Azman	11	0	11	0
26	DF	(Singapore) Kishon Philip	9+1	1	10	1
29	FW	(Singapore) Amir Zalani	0+1	0	1	0
30	GK	(Singapore) Izwan Mahbud	10	0	10	0
53	MF	(Singapore) Jarrel Ong Jia Wei	1	1	1	1
55	MF	(Singapore) Josiah Phua Yong Qi	5	0	5	0
57	MF	(Singapore) Hairil Sufi	1	0	1	0
Players who have played this season but had left the club or on loan to other club
3	DF	(Singapore) Afiq Yunos	0	0	0	0

== Competitions ==
=== Overview ===
Competition	Record							
Competition	P	W	D	L	GF	GA	GD	Win %

=== Singapore Premier League ===
Win Draw Loss

13 March 2021 1	Albirex Niigata (S) (Japan)	3–1	(Singapore) Hougang United	Jurong East Stadium
	Kiyoshiro Tsuboi 25' 85'; Takahiro Tezuka 39'; Ryoya Tanigushi (yellow card) 78'		Jarrel Ong Jia Wei 42'; Idraki Adnan (yellow card) 24'; Kaishu Yamazaki (yellow card) 44'; Hafiz Sujad (yellow card) 78'; Farhan Zulkifli (yellow card) 80'	Attendance: 0 Referee: Muhammad Taqi

17 March 2021 2	Hougang United (Singapore)	4–1	(Singapore) Geylang International	Hougang Stadium
	Tomoyuki Doi 10' 51' (pen.); Hafiz Sujad 80'; Gilberto Fortunato 83'; Farhan Zulkifli (yellow card) 55'; Shawal Anuar (yellow card) 74'; Lionel Tan (yellow card) 85'	Report	Amy Recha 4'; Faizal Roslan (yellow card) 51'	Attendance: 0 Referee: Nathan Chan

20 March 2021 3	Lion City Sailors (Singapore)	1–3	(Singapore) Hougang United	Jalan Besar Stadium
	Stipe Plazibat 85'; Nur Adam Abdullah (yellow card) 65'	Report	Lionel Tan 19'; Tomoyuki Doi 20' 59'; Mukundan Maran (yellow card) 69'	Attendance: 0 (Note: Due to the COVID-19 pandemic, this match was played behind closed doors.); Referee: Juherman Zaiton

3 April 2021 4	Hougang United (Singapore)	5–1	(Singapore) Tampines Rovers	Hougang Stadium
	Tomoyuki Doi 19' 22' 90'; Maksat Dzhakybaliev 68' (yellow card) 54'; Shahfiq Ghani 71'; Lionel Tan (yellow card) 8'	Report	Boris Kopitović 23'; Baihakki Khaizan (yellow card) 36' (yellow-red card) 70'; Shah Shahiran (yellow card) 83'	Attendance: 0 Referee: Lim Liang Yi

7 April 2021 5	Tanjong Pagar United (Singapore)	3–3	(Singapore) Hougang United	Jurong East Stadium
	Shodai Nishikawa 6'; Luiz Júnior 60'; Reo Nishiguchi 84'; Shahrin Saberin (yellow card) 31'; Fashah Iskandar (yellow card) 36'; Naufal Ilham (yellow card) 54'; Ammirul Emmran (yellow card) 74'	Report	Idraki Adnan 27'; Tomoyuki Doi 61' 90+6'; Farhan Zulkifli (yellow card) 16'; Maksat Dzhakybaliev (yellow card) 39'; Fabian Kwok (yellow card) 80'; Anders Aplin (yellow card) 86'	Attendance: 0 Referee: Syarqawi Buhari

10 April 2021 6	Balestier Khalsa (Singapore)	0–1	(Singapore) Hougang United	Toa Payoh Stadium
	Ensar Brunčević (red card) 21'; Ahmad Syahir (yellow card) 72'; Aarish Kumar (yellow card) 72'	Report	Tomoyuki Doi 63'; Maksat Dzhakybaliev (yellow card) 74'	Attendance: 0 Referee: Y.Sathyakumar

17 April 2021 7	Hougang United (Singapore)	1–1	(Singapore) Young Lions FC	Hougang Stadium
	Tomoyuki Doi 90+1'; Anders Aplin (yellow card) 41'; Lionel Tan (yellow card) 88'	Report	Glenn Kweh 74'; Harhys Stewart (yellow card) 81'	Attendance: 0 Referee: Taufik Thana

9 May 2021 8	Hougang United (Singapore)	4–3	(Singapore) Balestier Khalsa	Hougang Stadium
	Kaishu Yamazaki 9'; Lionel Tan 29'; Idraki Adnan 36'; Hafiz Sujad 87'; Ridhuan Barudin (yellow card) 56'; Muhaimin Suhaimi (yellow card) 61'; Nazrul Nazari (yellow card) 88'	Report	Šime Žužul 3'; Faizal Raffi 45'; Kristijan Krajcek 72' (yellow card) 78'; Marko Kraljević (yellow card) 45+2'	Attendance: 0 Referee: Ahmad A'qasyah

16 May 2021 9	Geylang International (Singapore)	2–5	(Singapore) Hougang United	Our Tampines Hub
	Amy Recha 86'; Sylvano Comvalius 90+3'; Darren Teh (yellow card) 45+2'; Yuki Ichikawa (yellow card) 87'	Report	Tomoyuki Doi 28' 90+5'; Idraki Adnan 36'; Afiq Noor 66'; Shawal Anuar 72'; Lionel Tan (yellow card) 35'	Attendance: 0 Referee: Nathan Chan

24 April 2021 10 (Rescheduled)	Hougang United (Singapore)	0–1	(Singapore) Lion City Sailors	Hougang Stadium
	Farhan Zulkifli (yellow card) 7'; Idraki Adnan (yellow card) 47'; Anders Aplin (yellow card) 79'	Report	Diego Lopes 69'; Jorge Fellipe (yellow card) 90+3'	Attendance: 250; Referee: Farhad Mohamed

22 May 2021 11	Tampines Rovers (Singapore)	2–3	(Singapore) Hougang United	Our Tampines Hub
	Yasir Hanapi 12'; Boris Kopitović 62'	Report	Nazrul Nazari 45+1' (yellow card) 39'; Tomoyuki Doi 50'; Idraki Adnan 55'; Shafiq Ghani (yellow card) 88'; Muhaimin Suhaimi (yellow card) 90+4'	Attendance: 0 Referee: Taufik Thana

24 July 2021 12 (Rescheduled)	Hougang United (Singapore)	1–4	(Singapore) Tanjong Pagar United	Hougang Stadium
	Tomoyuki Doi 62'; Gilberto Fortunato (yellow card) 63'; Rusyaidi Salime (yellow card) 76'	Report	Anaqi Ismit 48'; Luiz Júnior 67'; Reo Nishiguchi 88'; Khairul Amri 90+4'	Referee: Jansen Foo

30 July 2021 13 (Rescheduled)	Hougang United (Singapore)	1–2	(Singapore) Albirex Niigata (S)	Hougang Stadium
	Kishon Philip 30'; Hafiz Sujad (yellow card) 77'; Maksat Dzhakybaliev (yellow card) 89'	Report	Kuraba Kondo 51'; Takahiro Tezuka 65'; Ryoya Tanigushi (yellow card) 90+5'	Referee: Syarqawi Buhari

7 August 2021 14 (Rescheduled)	Young Lions FC (Singapore)	0–1	(Singapore) Hougang United	Jalan Besar Stadium
	Hami Syahin (yellow card) 20' (yellow-red card) 71'; Arshad Shamim (yellow card) 72'	Report	Tomoyuki Doi 77'	Referee: Nathan Chan

13 August 2021 15 (Rescheduled)	Albirex Niigata (S) (Japan)	4–1	(Singapore) Hougang United	Jurong East Stadium
	Reo Kunimoto 2' 78'; Yasuhiro Hanada 89'; Takahiro Tezuka 90+1'	Report	Takahiro Tezuka 82' (o.g.); Maksat Dzhakybaliev (yellow card) 22'; Nazrul Nazari (yellow card) 30'; Anders Aplin (yellow card) 40'	Referee: Ahmad A'qashah

20 August 2021 16 (Rescheduled)	Hougang United (Singapore)	2–1	(Singapore) Geylang International	Hougang Stadium
	Shawal Anuar 59'; Hafiz Sujad 75'	Report	Amy Recha 82'; Yuki Ichikawa (yellow card) 38'	Referee: Jansen Foo

27 August 2021 17 (Rescheduled)	Lion City Sailors (Singapore)	1–1	(Singapore) Hougang United	Jalan Besar Stadium
	Stipe Plazibat 75'; Hafiz Nor (yellow card) 78'; Diego Lopes (yellow card) 90+2'	Report	Anders Aplin 50'; Farhan Zulkifli (yellow card) 35'; Hafiz Sujad (yellow card) 75'	Referee: Taufik Thana

11 September 2021 18 (Rescheduled)	Hougang United (Singapore)	7–3	(Singapore) Tampines Rovers	Hougang Stadium
	Fabian Kwok 3'; Tomoyuki Doi 18' 23' 33'; Lionel Tan 65'; Gilberto Fortunato 73'; Hafiz Sujad 80'; Farhan Zulkifli (yellow card) 55'	Report	Zehrudin Mehmedović 12' (yellow card) 30'; Boris Kopitović 42' 59'; Taufik Suparno (yellow card) 65'	Referee: Juherman Zaiton

18 September 2021 19 (Rescheduled)	Tanjong Pagar United (Singapore)	1–1	(Singapore) Hougang United	Jurong East Stadium
	Khairul Amri 53'; Raihan Rahman (yellow card) 70'; Faritz Hameed (yellow card) 85'	Report	Gilberto Fortunato 8'; Fabian Kwok (yellow card) 21'	Referee: Shadiq Al-Hussain

6 October 2021 20 (Rescheduled)	Balestier Khalsa (Singapore)	3–2	(Singapore) Hougang United	Toa Payoh Stadium
	Puvan Raj Sivalingam 10' 35'; Šime Žužul 85'	Report	Gilberto Fortunato 53'; Shawal Anuar 62'; Muhaimin Suhaimi (yellow card) 66'; Maksat Dzhakybaliev (yellow card) 67'	Referee: Hilmi Fuad

10 October 2021 21 (Rescheduled)	Hougang United (Singapore)	1–3	(Singapore) Young Lions FC	Hougang Stadium
	Fabian Kwok 73' (yellow card) 77'; Kishon Philip (yellow card) 45'	Report	Harhys Stewart 15'; Shah Shahiran 32'; Zamani Zamri 55' (yellow card) 80'	Referee: Taufil Thana

Pos	Team	Pld	W	D	L	GF	GA	GD	Pts	Qualification or relegation
1	Lion City Sailors	21	14	6	1	59	21	+38	48	Qualification for AFC Champions League group stage
2	Albirex Niigata (S) (Note: The foreign club – Albirex Niigata (S) – as well as the Football Association of Singapore (FAS) under-21 team, Young Lions, are ineligible for any AFC competition spots.)	21	13	7	1	50	19	+31	46	
3	Hougang United	21	10	4	7	48	40	+8	34	Qualification for AFC Cup group stage
4	Tampines Rovers	21	7	6	8	48	51	−3	27	Qualification for AFC Cup group stage
5	Tanjong Pagar United	21	5	7	9	36	49	−13	22	

Updated to match(es) played on 3 April 2021. Source: Singapore Premier League
Rules for classification: 1) points; 2) goal difference; 3) number of goals scored; 4) number of wins
