= Anders Aplin =

Singapore international footballer (born 1991)

Personal information
- Full name: Anders Aplin
- Date of birth: 21 June 1991 (age 35)
- Place of birth: Singapore
- Height: 1.80 m (5 ft 11 in)
- Position: Centre-back

Team information
- Current team: Retired

Youth career
- National Football Academy U-18s

Senior career*
| Years | Team | Apps | (Gls) |
| 2010–2012 | Singapore Cricket Club | | |
| 2013 | Singapore Vipers | | |
| 2014–2015 | Singapore Recreation Club | | |
| 2016–2019 | Geylang International | 55 | (1) |
| 2018–2019 | → Matsumoto Yamaga (loan) | 0 | (0) |
| 2020–2026 | Hougang United | 90 | (4) |

International career^{‡}
| 2018– | Singapore | 2 | (0) |
- * Club domestic league appearances and goals as of 19 April 2023 ‡ National team caps and goals as of 24 March 2018

Anders Aplin, better known as Anders, is a Singaporean former footballer who played as a centre-back. He was known for his long-throw-ins and defensive attributes.

Mainly a centre-back, he is also capable of playing as either a right-back, central-midfielder, and occasionally as a striker.

== Club career ==
=== Youth career ===
Aplin was part of the Singapore Sports School's inaugural cohort of footballers and moved on to the National Football Academy under-18s. In 2009, he was part of the Victoria Junior College football team which won the National Schools A Division title.

=== Singapore Cricket Club ===
Although Aplin was part of the Singapore Sports School's inaugural cohort of footballers, playing alongside future Lions such as Safuwan Baharudin and Madhu Mohana, his decision to focus on his studies saw him fall through the cracks of Singapore's professional football circuit. As a result, Anders played for Singapore Cricket Club in the amateur National Football League.

=== Singapore Recreation Club ===
Aplin next played for another NFL side, Singapore Recreation Club, where he was spotted by Geylang International coach Mohd Noor Ali, who was then helming Yishun Sentek Mariners. He was invited for trials with Geylang at the end of 2015 who was drawn to his aggression and determination.

=== Geylang International ===
Aplin started his professional football career with Geylang International in 2016 and made his debut in a League Cup game against Balestier Khalsa. He signed his first professional contract a year later. His performances in the 2017 S.League season saw him win his first call up to Singapore national team. He was also picked for a trial with J2 League side Matsumoto Yamaga in early 2018.

=== Matsumoto Yamaga ===
On 7 August 2018, it was announced on the club's website that Aplin had signed a loan deal with Matsumoto Yamaga until the end of the season. This loan made him the first Singaporean to play in the J2 League and in Japan. In his time at the Japanese club, Aplin had his own cheer song from the club Ultras.

=== Hougang United ===
Aplin was unveiled as a Hougang United player ahead of the 2020 season. He made his first start for the club against Tampines Rovers in the 2020 Singapore Community Shield. On 5 October 2023, Aplin assisted Đorđe Maksimović in the 89' minute of the game to settled a 2–1 win in the 2023–24 AFC Cup group stage fixture against Vietnamese club, Haiphong.

After the departure of long term club captain Nazrul Nazari, Anders was chosen as the club captain ahead of the 2025–26 season.

== International career ==
Aplin was first called up by coach V. Sundramoorthy in 2017 although he did not travel with the team for the friendly against Qatar and the Asian Cup qualifier against Turkmenistan on 10 October. He made his debut on 23 March 2018 in a 3-2 win against Maldives, replacing Irfan Fandi in the 73rd minute.

== Personal life ==
Aplin is the cousin of former Singapore international footballer Tan Kim Leng. Aplin is also a graduate of Nanyang Technological University (NTU), with a degree in business. He was also a commando in the Singapore Armed Forces (SAF) during his National Service.

From December 2019 to March 2021, Aplin was married to Rachel Wong, having first met while studying at NTU. The marriage was later annulled by Aplin on account of Wong's infidelity.

== Career statistics ==
=== Club ===
As of match played 27 February 2022

| | Season | S.League | | Singapore Cup | | League Cup | | ACL | | AFC Cup | | Total | |
| | Season | Apps | Goals | Apps | Goals | Apps | Goals | Apps | Goals | Apps | Goals | Apps | Goals |
|---|---|---|---|---|---|---|---|---|---|---|---|---|---|
| Geylang International | 2016 | 9 | 0 | 0 | 0 | 4 | 0 | — | | | | 13 | 0 |
| Geylang International | 2017 | 19 | 0 | 1 | 0 | 4 | 0 | — | | | | 24 | 0 |
| Geylang International | 2018 | 8 | 1 | 0 | 0 | 0 | 0 | — | | | | 8 | 1 |
| Geylang International | 2019 | 19 | 0 | 6 | 0 | 0 | 0 | — | | | | 25 | 0 |
| Geylang International | Total | 55 | 1 | 7 | 0 | 8 | 0 | - | - | - | - | 70 | 1 |
| Matsumoto Yamaga FC (loan) | 2018 | 0 | 0 | 0 | 0 | 0 | 0 | — | | | | 0 | 0 |
| Matsumoto Yamaga FC (loan) | Total | 0 | 0 | 0 | 0 | 0 | 0 | - | - | - | - | 0 | 0 |
| Hougang United | 2020 | 14 | 2 | 0 | 0 | 1 | 0 | 0 | 0 | 3 | 0 | 18 | 2 |
| Hougang United | 2021 | 14 | 1 | 0 | 0 | 0 | 0 | 0 | 0 | 0 | 0 | 14 | 1 |
| Hougang United | 2022 | 24 | 1 | 6 | 0 | 0 | 0 | 0 | 0 | 3 | 0 | 33 | 1 |
| Hougang United | 2023 | 16 | 0 | 6 | 0 | 0 | 0 | 0 | 0 | 5 | 0 | 27 | 0 |
| Hougang United | 2024–25 | 0 | 0 | 0 | 0 | 0 | 0 | 0 | 0 | 0 | 0 | 0 | 0 |
| Hougang United | Total | 68 | 4 | 12 | 0 | 1 | 0 | 0 | 0 | 11 | 0 | 92 | 4 |
| Career total | | 123 | 5 | 19 | 0 | 9 | 0 | 0 | 0 | 14 | 0 | 162 | 5 |

=== International ===
| No | Date | Venue | Opponent | Result | Competition |
|---|---|---|---|---|---|
| 1 | 23 March 2018 | Bishan Stadium, National Stadium, Singapore | Maldives | 3-2 (won) | Friendly |
| 2 | 27 March 2018 | Taipei Municipal Stadium, Taipei, Taiwan | Chinese Taipei | 0-1 (lost) | 2019 AFC Asian Cup qualification – third round |

As of match played 27 March 2018 Appearances and goals by national team and year

Singapore National Team
| Year | Apps | Goals |
|---|---|---|
| 2018 | 2 | 0 |
| Total | 2 | 0 |

== Honours ==
=== Club ===
Hougang United

- Singapore Cup Champions (1): 2022
- Singapore Cup Runner-ups (1): 2023
