= Wrestling Federation of Singapore =

Singapore Wrestling - Wrestling Federation of Singapore
- Formation: Founded as the Wrestling Federation of Singapore in 2008
- Type: Sports Federation
- Headquarters: 3 Bedok North Street 2, Bedok Sports Hall, Singapore(469643)
- Website: http://www.singaporewrestling.com/

The Wrestling Federation of Singapore (WFS) introduced wrestling as a national sport to Singapore in 2008 and formed a National Sports Association (NSA) with the Singapore Sports Council and Singapore National Olympic Council.

Founding Fathers of Singapore Wrestling: Mike Denoma and Jimmy Taenaka

WFS appointed Sergei Beloglazov as the first Singapore National Head Coach. Beloglazov was a former six times World Champion and two times Olympic Champion.

Singapore claimed its first medal in their 1st appearance at the 2009 Southeast Asian Games in Laos. Mohamad Sulaiman took a silver medal in the 74 kg Freestyle Wrestling category.

Melvynna Tambunan is Singapore's first female wrestler at 48 kg, competing in the 2009 Asian Senior Championships, 2009 Klippan Lady Open, 2009 World Championships in Denmark and 2009 Southeast Asian Games in Laos.

Freestyle Wrestling in Singapore is currently being developed with the intent of becoming accepted as one of the national sports. Styles will include Freestyle, Greco-Roman, Beach wrestling.

The Wrestling Federation of Singapore's belt system is the first belt system to ever be adopted by a national governing body for wrestling in the world. This unique system was designed by a committee made up of national coaches from both Russia and the United States, and it has a total of 9 levels of belts ranging from the Yellow Belt and advancing to a 4th degree of Black Belt. The initial belts are based on the number of approved techniques mastered and the more advanced belts require increasingly difficult levels of success in actual competition.

The Yellow Belt requires that a wrestler demonstrate a mastery of 8 qualified techniques or participation in 60 training sessions. The Orange Belt requires a demonstrated mastery of 20 qualified techniques or participation in 120 training sessions.

In Singapore, wrestling is promoting/taught to all schools to create awareness of the sport. Many parents think the sport of wrestling is dangerous because of the World Wrestling Entertainment (WWE). WFS is increasing awareness in Singapore on the safety, technique, conditioning and discipline of the sport.
