= Hirotaka Usui =

Japanese football manager (born 1980)

Personal information
- Date of birth: 6 April 1980 (age 46)
- Place of birth: Shiojiri, Nagano, Japan

Team information
- Current team: Blaublitz Akita (Assistant Manager)

Youth career
- Matsusho Gakuen HS
- Nihon University

Senior career*
Years	Team	Apps	(Gls)
- FC Anterope
- Nagano Elza

Managerial career
- 2003–2004: Nihon University
- 2006–2008: Nagano Elza (assistant)
- 2009–2011: Nagano Elza (youth)
- 2011–2014: Matsumoto Yamaga U18 (assistant)
- 2018: Geylang International
- 2019–2020: Matsumoto Yamaga U18 (assistant)
- 2020–2021: Matsumoto Yamaga U18
- 2021–: Blaublitz Akita (assistant)
- * Club domestic league appearances and goals

Hirotaka Usui (臼井 弘貴, Usui Hirotaka; born 6 April 1980) is a Japanese football manager. He was once in charge of Singapore Premier League side Geylang International, and is currently employed as the Assistant Manager of J2 League side Blaublitz Akita.

== Managerial statistics ==
As of 1 March 2019.

Managerial record by team and tenure
Team	From	To	Record				
Team	From	To	P	W	D	L	Win %
Geylang International	2018	2018	26	5	6	15	19.2
Total			26	5	6	15	19.2
