= Maksat Dzhakybaliev =

Serbian footballer

Personal information
- Full name: Maksat Dzhakybaliev
- Date of birth: 18 February 2000 (age 26)
- Place of birth: Kyrgyzstan
- Height: 1.82 m (6 ft 0 in)
- Position: Defender

Team information
- Current team: Asiagoal Bishkek
- Number: 3

Youth career
- 2019: Sivasspor

Senior career*
Years	Team	Apps	(Gls)
2020–2022	Hougang United	21	(1)
2022	FC Kaganat	7	(0)
- * Club domestic league appearances and goals

Maksat Dzhakybaliev (born 18 February 2000) is a Kyrgyzstani professional footballer.

== Club career ==
=== Hougang United ===
He join the club on loan from Turkey club, Sivasspor u-21.

He made his debut against Tampines Rovers on 17 October 2020.

== Career statistics ==
=== Club ===
As of 10 Oct 2021

Club	Season	League			FA Cup		Other		Total	
Club	Season	Division	Apps	Goals	Apps	Goals	Apps	Goals	Apps	Goals
Hougang United	2020	Singapore Premier League	7	0	0	0	0	0	7	0
Hougang United	2021	Singapore Premier League	14	1	0	0	0	0	14	1
FC Kaganat	2022	Kyrgyz Premier League	7	1	0	0	0	0	7	1
FC Alga Bishkek	2022	Kyrgyz Premier League	11	0	0	0	0	0	11	0
FC Alga Bishkek	2023	Kyrgyz Premier League	16	0	0	0	0	0	16	0
FC Alga Bishkek	2024	Kyrgyz Premier League	19	1	0	0	0	0	19	1
Asiagoal Bishkek	2025	Kyrgyz Premier League	2	0	0	0	0	0	2	0
Career total			21	1	0	0	0	0	21	1
