= Stanely Ng =

Singaporean footballer

Personal information
- Full name: Stanely Ng Yong Woo
- Date of birth: 27 May 1992 (age 34)
- Place of birth: Singapore
- Height: 1.70 m (5 ft 7 in)
- Position: Midfielder

Team information
- Current team: Hougang United
- Number: 10

Youth career
- 2007–2010: National Football Academy

Senior career*
Years	Team	Apps	(Gls)
2011	Geylang United Prime League	25	(11)
2011	Geylang United FC	2	(0)
2013–2014	Courts Young Lions	31	(0)
2015	Home United FC	23	(4)
2016–2017	Geylang International	28	(4)
2018–	Hougang United	0	(0)

International career
2011–2015	Singapore U23	32	(5)
2014–	Singapore	0	(0)
- * Club domestic league appearances and goals as of 2 July 2017

Stanely Ng Yong Woo (born 27 May 1992) is a Singaporean footballer who plays as a midfielder for Hougang United FC in the Singapore Premier League.

== Club career ==
=== Geylang United ===
Ng began his professional football career with Geylang United FC in the Sleague in 2011.

Ng made his Sleague debut as the first prime league player in the year, he came on as a substitute against Young Lions. He appeared a couple of times in the Sleague.

Ng helped Geylang United prime league team to win the championship in his first season. Alongside the likes of Amy Recha, Wahyudi Wahid and Taufiq Ghani.

=== Courts Young Lions ===
In 2012, Ng signed for Courts Young Lions, however due to national service commitments Ng failed to make a single appearance throughout the 2012 season.

Ng returned to the Young Lions squad in the only August 2013 season, made his debut against Hougang United and only made 5 appearances in the season.

In 2014, Ng stayed with the Courts Young Lions for his development of football, which seemed promising and exciting at the start of the season. Unfortunately, this was not the case for the remainder of the season as he found himself often on the bench. Also missing out on a spot in the 2014 Asian Games in Incheon, South Korea.

=== Home United ===
In 2015, Ng signed for Home United FC, where he secured a regular starting position and scored his first goal in April against Balestier Khalsa. He was subsequently named to Singapore's squad for the SEA Games. He recorded 4 goals and 5 assists across all competitions that season.

=== Geylang International ===
Stanely resigned for the Eagles for the 2016 S.League season and scored on the opening day of the campaign, earning Geylang a share of the spoils in a 3–3 draw against title-favourites, Tampines Rovers.

Represented Geylang International alongside Amy Recha and Syazwan Buhari for Singapore Selection for this year's Sultan of Selangor's Cup 2016. Where Ng played an important role as he scored a beautiful left-footed curler for the equaliser goal that cancelled out Gopinathan Ramachandra's goal. The Singapore Selection team went on to lift the Sultan of Selangor's Cup for the first time since 2011 by beating Selangor Selection 4–3 through a penalty shootout after the score was tied 1–1 at full-time.

=== Hougang United ===
Upon being released by Geylang International, Stanely signed for Hougang United for the 2018 S-League Season.

== International career ==
=== Youth ===
In 2008, the forward was part of the talented Class of '92 that became the first Singaporean youth team to qualify for a continental finals, when they made the AFC Under-16 Championship, scoring six goals in four games in the qualifiers.

While there was never any doubt over his talent, Ng's form dipped as his playing time with the Courts Young Lions was reduced during his National Service stint.

=== Senior ===
In 2014, the midfielder received his first call up to the senior team for friendlies against Hong Kong and Papua New Guinea but has yet to make a senior debut for the Lions.

In 2015, Ng was called up to the national team for the 2015 Southeast Asian Games in Singapore.
