= Jasper Chan =

Singaporean footballer

Personal information
- Full name: Jasper Chan Yu Hui 曾羽辉
- Date of birth: 7 November 1988 (age 38)
- Place of birth: Singapore
- Height: 1.83 m (6 ft 0 in)
- Position: Goalkeeper

Senior career*
Years	Team	Apps	(Gls)
2007–2011	Young Lions	12	(0)
2012–2014	Eunos Crescent		
2015	Hougang United	2	(0)
2016–2017	Warriors	4	(0)
2018	Geylang International		

International career
- Singapore U23
2007–	Singapore		
- * Club domestic league appearances and goals as of 2008

Jasper Chan Yu Hui (born 7 November 1988 in Singapore) is a Singaporean footballer who plays as a goalkeeper for S.League club, Geylang International.

== Club career ==
Chan started out in football as a striker, only switching to between the sticks when he was 12 "because the competition for outfield players got a bit hot."

His rise from S-League rookie to major player has been a steep one. When he first joined his current club, Young Lions, he was only the 2nd choice keeper. But two months into his professional football career, he got a starting spot in the first eleven and he has kept it since.

In 2015, he signed for Hougang United.

== International career ==
Chan was part of the Singapore Under-23 team that took part in the 2007 Southeast Asian Games in Korat, Thailand that won a bronze medal.

Chan sterling performances for the club has not gone unnoticed. He was first called up to the Singapore national football team in September 2007 and he has been a regular fixture in the national team since, although only as a substitute behind Lionel Lewis and Hassan Sunny. As of May 28, 2008, he was still uncapped.

The goalkeeping coach for Singapore, Lee Bee Seng who played for Singapore in the 1970s, made the bold prediction that "it is only a matter of time before (Chan) starts challenging for a place in the national team".

== Personal life ==
Chan studied general business studies at Temasek Polytechnic.

== Honours ==
=== International ===
- Southeast Asian Games Bronze Medallist: 2007
