= Víctor Coto =

Costa Rican footballer (born 1990)

Personal information
- Full name: Víctor Miguel Coto Ortega
- Date of birth: 29 September 1990 (age 36)
- Place of birth: Limón, Costa Rica
- Height: 1.80 m (5 ft 11 in)
- Position: Striker

Team information
- Current team: Geylang International
- Number: 16

Youth career
- Deportivo Saprissa
- Cisco Roma

Senior career*
Years	Team	Apps	(Gls)
2008–2009	Sliema Wanderers	9	(2)
2010	Gimnasia Jujuy	19	(0)
2011	Zeyar Shew Myay		
2012	Persijap Jepara		(1)
2013–2014	UCR	47	(5)
2015–2016	Zeyar Shew Myay	22	(7)
2017	Geylang International	22	(5)
- * Club domestic league appearances and goals as of 21 October 2017

Víctor Miguel Coto Ortega (born 29 September 1990, in Limón, Costa Rica) is a Costa Rican footballer. He is the first Costa Rican to have ever played in the S.League.

== Club career ==
Leaving Costa Rica aged 15 to start his youth career, Coto lived in Italy, during his time at Cisco Roma.

He has played in Europe and Asia had a spell at Argentine second division outfit Gimnasia Jujuy who released him in December 2011.

Coto played the 2014 Verano for Costa Rican primera division side UCR.

Penning a one-year contract with Geylang International in February 2017, the striker scored three goals in pre-season for the Singaporean team, registering his first competitive goal for the Eagles in a 1–1 tie with Warriors FC in the S.League.

Persija Jakarta were rumored to have shown interest in buying him for the 2016 Indonesia Soccer Championship A.
