= Al-Qaasimy Rahman =

Singaporean footballer

Personal information
- Full name: Muhammad Al-Qaasimy bin Abdul Rahman
- Date of birth: 21 January 1992 (age 34)
- Place of birth: Singapore
- Height: 1.76 m (5 ft 9 1/2 in)
- Position: Left-back

Youth career
- 2006–2010: National Football Academy (Singapore)

Senior career*
Years	Team	Apps	(Gls)
2010–2015	Courts Young Lions	70	(0)
2015	LionsXII	1	(0)
2016–2017	Geylang International	21	(1)

International career^{‡}
2007–2015	Singapore U23		
2014–2017	Singapore	6	(0)
Medal record
Men's football
Representing Singapore
Sea Games
Bronze medal – third place	Sea Games 2013	Football
- * Club domestic league appearances and goals as of 12:08, 28 April 2017 (UTC) ‡ National team caps and goals as of 12:08, 20 June 2015 (UTC)

Muhammad Al-Qaasimy bin Abdul Rahman (born 21 January 1992) is a Singaporean former footballer who last played as left-back for club Geylang International in the S.League.

In November 2014, he was called upon to the Singapore national team for the 2014 AFF Championship, which was his first senior international tournament.

== Early life ==
Muhammad Al-Qaasimy bin Abdul Rahman was born to parents, Abdul Rahman, his father, and, Habibullah Aman, his mother, in Singapore. He has an elder brother, Al-Kautsar. Qaasimy was introduced to football by both his father and brother and claimed it was the only sport introduced to him at a young age. His passion for football grew from then on and told his father that he wanted to go on and pursue football. Qaasimy won many trophies in his primary school and his teacher saw his potential and recommended his father to apply Qaasimy into the Singapore Sports School where he develop into his full potential. From then on that his father agreed Qaasimy's choice to pursue football and applied to the Singapore Sports School.

== Club career ==
=== Early career ===
Qaasimy started out as a striker before being converted into a right-back during his time in the NFA. He could play on both flanks of the fullback position while being on the right is his main and favourable side. After graduation from the Singapore Sports School, he had a burnout and lost passion for the game and almost quit his football path which he set on while at a very young age. He agreed to play for the Young Lions when they called him up to sign with them, "giving it a last go" before making a final decision on his career path. From then on, his career as a footballer skyrocketed and his passion for the game came back even stronger and decided to remain a footballer.

=== Young Lions ===
Having graduated from Singapore Sports School, Al-Qaasimy joined the Young Lions at the age of 18 whilst continuing his studies in Republic Polytechnic, a local tertiary institution. In his third season at the club, he was named as captain of the team at the start of the 2013 S.League season, succeeding from Hafiz Abu Sujad.

=== LionsXII ===
On 27 April 2015, it is announced that Al-Qaasimy will sign for Malaysian Super League side, LionsXII. He only joined the team after his SEA Games duties, during the mid-season transfer window.

=== Geylang International FC ===
In the 2016 season, Al-Qaasimy joined the Eagles from LionsXII. He was often deployed as a left full-back due to Faritz Hameed taking on the right. Al-Qaasimy was often dubbed by many people, the offensive full-back. He made his debut for the team in the first game of the 2016 S.League season, in a 3-3 draw with Tampines Rovers.

Al-Qaasimy scored his first ever professional goal in Geylang's first match of the 2017 S.League season, helping his side to a 2-0 victory over Balestier Khalsa FC.

== International career ==
Al-Qaasimy was named as the captain for the Singapore national under-23 football team that was to take part in the 2015 Southeast Asian Games to be held in Singapore. He also had prior experience in leading a squad at the international level, having had captained the under-22 side in 2012 for the AFC Under-22 qualifiers.

He was given his first cap for the senior team by Bernd Stange in a 2-1 win over Papua New Guinea and earned 5 caps before he was called up to the disappointing 2014 AFF Championship side that failed to launch a decent defence of their title.
