= Bedok Stadium =

Stadium in Singapore

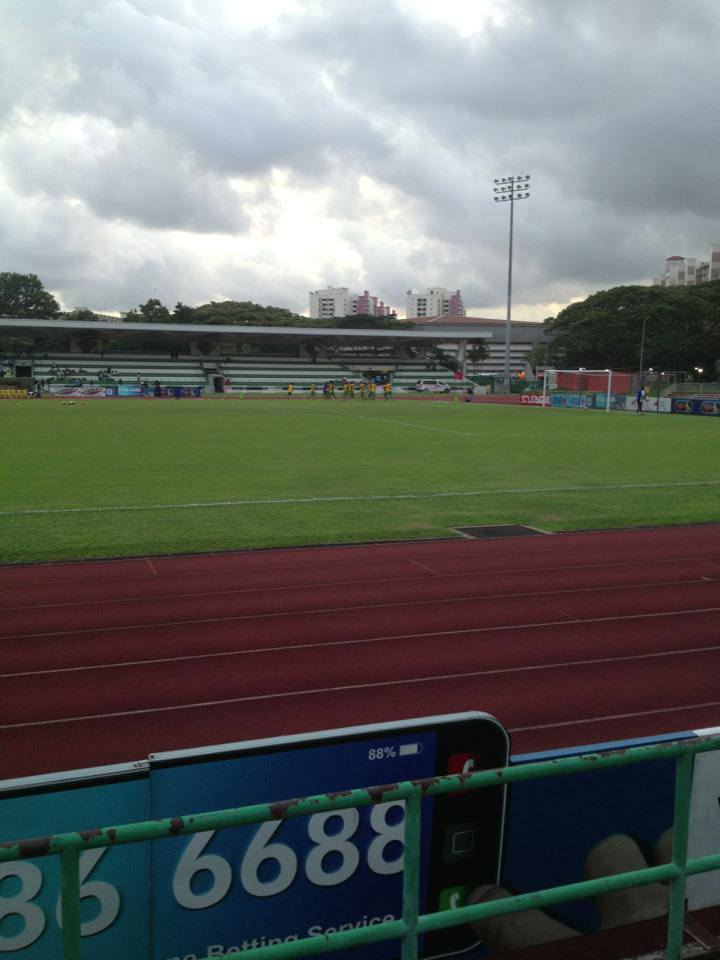
- Interactive map of Bedok Stadium
- Address: 1 Bedok North Street 2, Singapore 469642
- Location: Bedok, Singapore
- Coordinates: 1°19′35.06″N 103°56′21.35″E
- Owner: Sport Singapore
- Operator: Sport Singapore
- Capacity: 3,800
- Surface: Grass
- Scoreboard: Yes
- Public transit: EW5 Bedok; EW4 Tanah Merah

Construction
- Opened: 1 February 1982; 44 years ago
- Renovated: 2017

Tenant
- Geylang International (1996–2019)

Bedok Stadium is a football stadium located in Bedok, Singapore. It served as the home ground of Singapore Premier League side, Geylang International FC from 1996 till 2019. The stadium continues to host football matches for both the Singapore Premier League and Singapore National Football League competitions.

The stadium is managed by Sport Singapore, and is generally open to the public daily from 4:30am till 9:30pm, unless exclusively booked.

It has also occasionally served as a venue for general election rallies and post election assemblies, including those organised by the People's Action Party (PAP) and the Workers' Party (WP).

== History ==
People's Action Party general election rally at Bedok Stadium, 2011

Bedok Stadium is part of the Bedok Sports Complex, a community sports facility that also included the Bedok Swimming Complex, Bedok Indoor Sports Hall, and Bedok Fitness Centre. Construction of the complex was carried out in phases. Works on the swimming complex began in February 1979, followed by the stadium in October 1979, which was originally planned with a capacity of 1,500 spectators. Construction of the Indoors Sports Hall subsequently began in 1981.

Upon completion, Bedok Stadium was handed over to the Singapore Sports Council on 31 December 1981, and thereafter opened to the public on 1 February 1982.

The stadium underwent refurbishment in 2002, while its running track was replaced by Sport Singapore in September 2017. Several of the original sports facilities surrounding the Bedok Stadium, including the swimming pools, tennis courts, and some of the indoor halls facilities have since relocated to Heartbeat@Bedok, a nearby integrated development that officially opened in 2018.

== Facilities & Structures ==
The stadium has a seating capacity of 3,864 people, comprising 2000 permanent, 1000 semi-permanent & 864 portable seats. Its facilities include a football field, a running track, several athletic facilities, and a fitness corner. It is one of two stadiums in eastern Singapore with an eight-lane running track, with the other located at the Singapore University of Technology and Design.

Despite the redevelopment of other parts of the Bedok Sports Complex, several of the adjacent indoor sports halls remain in use. These accommodate facilities for several sporting associations, including the Singapore Boxing Federation, the Singapore Taekwondo Federation, the Singapore Weightlifting Federation, and the Wrestling Federation of Singapore.

== Future developments ==
The Urban Redevelopment Authority (URA) has proposed the redevelopment of Bedok Stadium and its surrounding precinct to provide a wider range of community and sporting facilities for residents. However, the location of the future stadium has yet to be determined, as the existing 7 hectare site occupied by Bedok Sports Complex and Bedok Stadium has been rezoned for residential use under the 2025 URA Master Plan.

== See also ==
- List of stadiums in Singapore
