= Roberto Camarasa =

Spanish footballer

Personal information
- Full name: Roberto Camarasa Calatayud
- Date of birth: 1 August 1995 (age 31)
- Place of birth: Rafelbunyol, Spain
- Height: 1.80 m (5 ft 11 in)
- Position: Midfielder

Senior career*
Years	Team	Apps	(Gls)
	Levante B	1	(0)
2014–2015	Almansa		
2015–2016	Alzira		
2016	Segorbe		
2016	Geylang International	3	(1)
2016–2017	Recambios Colón		
2018–2020	Puçol		
- * Club domestic league appearances and goals

Roberto Camarasa (born 1 August 1995 in Rafelbunyol, Spain) is a Spanish footballer. He is the son of former Spain international "Paco" Camarasa.

== Singapore ==
Placed in Geylang International of the Singaporean S.League's Prime League squad in mid-2016, Camarasa did not put in a torrid performance in any of his six appearances there, salvaging a goal in a 1–1 tie with DPMM in the 5th minute.

In the summer 2018, Camarasa joined UD Puçol.
