= Safirul Sulaiman =

Singaporean footballer (born 1992)

Personal information
- Full name: Safirul bin Sulaiman
- Date of birth: 12 October 1992 (age 34)
- Place of birth: Singapore
- Height: 1.73 m (5 ft 8 in)
- Position: Left midfielder

Team information
- Current team: Tampines Rovers
- Number: 6

Youth career
- National Football Academy

Senior career*
Years	Team	Apps	(Gls)
2010–2011	Young Lions	24	(1)
2012–2013	LionsXII	23	(0)
2014–2015	Young Lions	2	(0)
2016–2017	Geylang International	24	(0)
2018–2020	Tampines Rovers	12	(0)
2020	→ Geylang International (loan)	0	(0)
2022–2023	South Avenue SC	0	(0)

International career^{‡}
2012–2014	Singapore U22	4	(0)
2012–	Singapore	8	(0)
- * Club domestic league appearances and goals as of 4 October 2013 ‡ National team caps and goals as of 13 June 2017

Safirul bin Sulaiman (born 12 October 1992) is a Singaporean professional footballer who last plays as a left midfielder for National Football League Two club South Avenue SC and the Singapore national team.

== Club career ==
=== Young Lions ===
Safirul began his professional football career at S.League club Young Lions in 2010.

=== LionsXII ===
In December 2011, the Football Association of Singapore announced that Safirul had been signed on to the newly formed LionsXII in the 2012 Malaysia Super League. He played in 7 games as the Lions finished runners-up in their debut season.

Safirul was handed the number 11 jersey at the beginning of the 2013 season. He began to see more playing time, making 16 appearances in the league as LionsXII clinched their first Malaysia Super League title.

After 2 seasons with LionsXII, Safirul failed to make the squad for the 2014 season.

=== Return to Young Lions ===
On 21 February 2014, the FAS revealed that Safirul had made a return to former club Young Lions.

=== Geylang International ===
Safirul went to sign for Geylang International for the 2016 S.League in 2016.

=== Tampines Rovers ===
On 31 December 2017, Safirul joined rivals, Tampines Rovers.

=== Loan to Geylang International ===
On 2 October 2020, Safirul joined his former club for the 2020 Singapore Premier League on loan.

=== South Avenue SC ===
In 2022, Safirul joined National Football League Two club, South Avenue SC.

== International career ==
Safirul made his international debut and first start in a friendly match against Hong Kong on 1 June 2012.

== Personal life ==
Safirul graduated from the Singapore Sports School in 2009.

== Career statistics ==
=== Club ===
As of match played 2 Dec 2020

Club	Season	S.League		Singapore Cup		Singapore League Cup		Asia		Total	
Club	Season	Apps	Goals	Apps	Goals	Apps	Goals	Apps	Goals	Apps	Goals
Young Lions	2010	0	0	1	0	-	-	—		1	0
Young Lions	2011	24	1	—		—		—		24	1
Young Lions	Total	24	1	1	0	0	0	0	0	25	1
Club	Season	Malaysia Super League		Malaysia FA Cup		Malaysia Cup		Asia		Total	
LionsXII	2012	16	0	0	0	0	0	—		16	0
LionsXII	2013	7	0	2	0	9	0	—		18	0
LionsXII	Total	23	0	2	0	9	0	0	0	34	0
Club	Season	S.League		Singapore Cup		Singapore League Cup		Asia		Total	
Young Lions	2014	0	0	0	0	-	-	—		0	0
Young Lions	2015	0	0	0	0	-	-	—		0	0
Young Lions	Total	0	0	0	0	0	0	0	0	0	0
Geylang International	2016	5	0	5	0	-	-	—		10	0
Geylang International	2017	20	0	1	0	2	0	—		23	0
Geylang International	Total	25	0	6	0	2	0	0	0	33	0
Tampines Rovers	2018	3	0	0	0	-	-	6	0	9	0
Tampines Rovers	2019	1	0	0	0	-	-	0	0	0	0
Tampines Rovers	2020	1	0	0	0	-	-	1	0	2	0
Tampines Rovers	Total	5	0	0	0	0	0	7	0	12	0
Geylang International	2020	5	0	0	0	-	-	0	0	5	0
Geylang International	Total	5	0	0	0	0	0	0	0	5	0
Career Total		47	1	3	0	9	0	0	0	59	1

- Young Lions and LionsXII are ineligible for qualification to AFC competitions in their respective leagues.
- Young Lions withdrew from the Singapore Cup and Singapore League Cup in 2011 due to scheduled participation in the 2011 AFF U-23 Youth Championship.

=== U23 International goals ===
No	Date	Venue	Opponent	Score	Result	Competition
1	17 November 2011	Gelora Bung Karno Stadium, Jakarta	Thailand	0-2	0-2	2011 Southeast Asian Games
2	8 June 2015	Jalan Besar Stadium, Singapore	Cambodia	1-0	3-1	2015 Southeast Asian Games

== Honours ==
=== Club ===
LionsXII

- Malaysia Super League: 2013

Tampines Rovers

- Singapore Cup: 2019
- Singapore Community Shield: 2020
