= Nor Azli Yusoff =

Singaporean footballer

Personal information
- Full name: Nor Azli Bin Md Yusoff
- Date of birth: 29 April 1983 (age 43)
- Place of birth: Singapore
- Height: 1.69 m (5 ft 6 1/2 in)
- Position: Midfielder

Team information
- Current team: Geylang International II (Head Coach)

Senior career*
Years	Team	Apps	(Gls)
2005	Young Lions		
2005	Balestier Khalsa		
2006–2007	Gombak United		
2008–2010	Hougang United	44+	(0)
2011–2013	Home United	39	(0)
2014	Tanjong Pagar United	19	(0)
2015–2017	Geylang International	40	(0)

Managerial career
- 2025–: Geylang International II
- * Club domestic league appearances and goals

Nor Azli Yusoff is a retired Singaporean footballer who played as a midfielder who is currently the head coach of Singapore Premier League 2 club Geylang International II.

== Career ==
He started his career with the Cheetahs before moving to the Protectors. After his contract ended with Home United, he move to the Eagles in 2015 and stay on till now.

== Honours ==
=== Club ===
Home United

- Singapore Cup: 2013
- S.League: 2013 Runners Up

Tanjong Pagar

- Singapore League Cup: 2014 Runners Up

== Career statistics ==
As of 8 January 2017

Club	Season	S.League		Singapore Cup		Singapore League Cup		Total	
Club	Season	Apps	Goals	Apps	Goals	Apps	Goals	Apps	Goals
Hougang United	2009	18	0	0	0	0	0	0	0
Hougang United	2010	26	0	1	0	3	0	27	0
Home United	2011	19	0	5	0	3	0	27	0
Home United	2012	20	0	3	0	3	0	26	0
Home United	2013	17	0	1	0	2	0	20	0
Tanjong Pagar United	2014	19	0	2	0	5	0	26	0
Geylang International	2015	23	0	3	0	4	0	30	0
Geylang International	2016	17	0	3	0	4	0	24	0
Geylang International	2017	0	0	0	0	0	0	0	0
Total		159	0	18	0	24	0	180	0
Career total		159	0	18	0	24	0	180	0
