= Yuki Ichikawa =

Japanese footballer

Personal information
- Full name: Yuki Ichikawa (市川祐樹)
- Date of birth: August 29, 1987 (age 39)
- Place of birth: Niigata, Japan
- Height: 1.82 m (5 ft 11 1/2 in)
- Position: Defender

Youth career
- –1998: FC Kubiki
- 1999–2001: Kubiki Junior High School
- 2002–2004: Maebashi Ikuei High School

College career
Years	Team	Apps	(Gls)
2005–2008	Komazawa University		

Senior career*
Years	Team	Apps	(Gls)
2009–2011	Japan Soccer College		
2012–2013	Albirex Niigata Singapore	37	(0)
2014–2021	Geylang International	140	(11)
- * Club domestic league appearances and goals as of 20 October 2017

Yuki Ichikawa (市川 祐樹, Ichikawa Yūki; born August 29, 1987 in Niigata) is a Japanese football player, who is last played for S.League club Geylang International FC.

== Career ==
He played two seasons for Singapore side Albirex Niigata FC (Singapore) in the S.League after graduating from the JAPAN Soccer College. His primary role is a centre-back, but he can also play as a full-back.

== Honours ==
=== Individual ===
- Singapore Premier League Team of the Year: 2019

== Career statistics ==
As @ 10 Oct 2021

Club	Season	S.League		Singapore Cup		Singapore League Cup		Asia		Total	
Club	Season	Apps	Goals	Apps	Goals	Apps	Goals	Apps	Goals	Apps	Goals
Albirex Niigata (S)	2012	16	0	2	0	3	0	0	0	21	0
Albirex Niigata (S)	2013	21	0	1	0	4	0	0	0	26	0
Albirex Niigata (S)	Total	37	0	3	0	7	0	0	0	47	0
Geylang International	2014	24	2	3	0	3	0	0	0	30	2
Geylang International	2015	22	2	4	0	1	0	0	0	27	2
Geylang International	2016	23	0	3	0	5	0	0	0	31	0
Geylang International	2017	24	2	1	1	4	0	0	0	29	3
Geylang International	2018	23	1	2	0	0	0	0	0	25	1
Geylang International	2019	24	4	5	0	0	0	0	0	29	4
Geylang International	2020	14	0	0	0	0	0	0	0	14	0
Geylang International	2021	19	0	0	0	0	0	0	0	19	0
Geylang International	Total	173	11	18	1	13	0	0	0	204	12
Total		210	11	21	1	20	0	0	0	251	12
