= Taufiq Ghani =

Singaporean footballer

Personal information
- Full name: Muhammad Taufiq bin Ghani
- Date of birth: 19 November 1989 (age 36)
- Place of birth: Singapore
- Height: 1.76 m (5 ft 9 in)
- Position: Midfielder

Team information
- Current team: Geylang International
- Number: 22

Senior career*
| Years | Team | Apps | (Gls) |
| 2012–2013 | Geylang International | 26 | (1) |
| 2014 | Woodlands Wellington | 20 | (1) |
| 2015 | Hougang United | 9 | (0) |
| 2016– | Geylang International | 3 | (0) |
- * Club domestic league appearances and goals as of 17 January 2017

Muhammad Taufiq bin Ghani (born 19 November 1989) is a Singaporean professional football player who plays as a midfielder for Singapore Premier League club Geylang International. He is the older brother of footballer Shahfiq Ghani who’s also a professional footballer playing respectively as forward or midfielder for Singapore Premier League club Geylang International.

== Club career ==
In 2013, Taufiq played for Geylang International. In 2014, he played for Woodlands Wellington. After playing for Hougang for the 2015 season, Taufiq has since returned to Geylang International in 2016.
