= Amy Recha =

Singaporean footballer (born 1992)

Personal information
- Full name: Amy Recha Pristifana bin Samion
- Date of birth: 13 April 1992 (age 34)
- Place of birth: Surabaya, East Java, Indonesia
- Height: 1.71 m (5 ft 7 in)
- Positions: Forward; midfielder

Team information
- Current team: Albirex Niigata (S)
- Number: 7

Youth career
- Geylang International

Senior career*
Years	Team	Apps	(Gls)
2011–2013	Geylang International	28	(2)
2014–2015	Young Lions	28	(4)
2016–2017	Geylang International	43	(7)
2018	Home United	25	(2)
2019–2021	Geylang International	60	(21)
2022–2023	Hougang United	46	(13)
2024–	Albirex Niigata (S)	11	(2)

International career^{‡}
2016–	Singapore	13	(0)
- * Club domestic league appearances and goals as of 7 June 2016 ‡ National team caps and goals as of 29 December 2021

Amy Recha Pristifana bin Samion (born 13 April 1992), better known as Amy Recha, is a professional footballer who plays as a forward or midfielder for Singapore Premier League club Albirex Niigata (S), whom he vice-captains and the Singapore national team. Born in Indonesia, he represents Singapore at international level.

== Early life ==
Amy was born in Surabaya, Indonesia and moved to Singapore at a young age. His mother is Indonesian.

== Club career ==
=== Geylang International ===
Amy made his debut for Geylang International in the S.League on 25 May 2011 against Balestier Khalsa, coming on as a 59th-minute substitute for Masrezwan Masturi in the 59th minute, in which he also scored his first goal of his career in the 72nd minute as Geylang lost the match 3–1. He then scored his second goal of his career almost a year later on 10 May 2012 against Warriors in which he found the net in the 78th minute as Geylang drew the match 2–2.

=== Young Lions ===
Amy was loaned to the Young Lions between 2014 and 2015 and returned to the club in 2016.

=== Home United ===
Amy signed for Home United in 2018 after a dismal 2017 with Geylang International.

=== Geylang International ===
In 2019, Amy returned to the Eagles' nest after 1 season with the Protector.

==== Resurgence with the Eagles ====
Amy started the season off with an assist in a 2-–1 victory against Tanjong Pagar United after pressing on a loose ball and laying it off for Moresche. He followed this up with an opening goal against Hougang United in a 4–1 loss the following match. Despite losing 3 games in 5 matches, Amy had a good scoring streak having scored 4 and assisted 1 in the whole month of August. Amy would end his season with his best ever performance in his professional career with 12 goals and 3 assists.

=== Hougang United ===
On 19 January 2022, Amy signed for the Singapore Premier League side Hougang United. He'd score his first goal for the Cheetahs against his former sides as he converted a penalty against Zaiful Nizam. Amy would have a struggling season however as he went 7 games goalless until a 4–3 win against Cambodian side, Phnom Penh Crown in the 2022 AFC Cup where he scored a diving header. He'd score again against the Young Lions after the continental campaign but also made headlines for his open goal miss earlier. Recha would score and assist against the same opposition and followed this form with 2 goals against Lion City Sailors in a 9–4 defeat at home.

==== Singapore Cup run ====
Amy would prove to be an integral member of the squad that won the Singapore Cup. He would assist Shawal Anuar and score a superb volley against Geylang to give his side the lead and also provide an assist in a 4–2 win against Albirex Niigata (S). His cup form then led to a call up to the national team for the 2022 AFF Championship.

==== 2023 season ====
Amy scored his first goal of the season on the first match against Balestier Khalsa, poking in a tap-in to give his side the eventual win. He then converted from the spot against Tanjong Pagar United in a 3–1 win on 28 May 2023. On 7 June 2023, he scored his first professional hat-trick against Brunei DPMM. The first goal after pouncing on a Zulfahmi Arifin through ball and the second after pouncing on the rebound after Kristijan Naumovski saved Kristijan Krajček's shot. The latter would then assist Recha for his third with a volley to finish it off. On 22 December 2023, Hougang United announced that he will leave the club at the end of the 2023 season.

=== Albirex Niigata Singapore ===
On 30 December 2023, Albirex Niigata (S) announced the signing of Amy ahead of the 2024–25 Singapore Premier League season.

== International career ==
Amy was named in Singapore's tour of Japan in 2016, but did not play.

On 27 August 2021, Amy was called up to train with the national team in September. Then, on 11 November, he made his international debut in a friendly against Kyrgyzstan.

In 2022, Amy was included in the national team for the 2022 FAS Tri-Nations Series and 2022 AFF Championship.

== Career statistics ==
=== Club ===
Statistics accurate as of 10 October 2021

Club	Season	League		Singapore Cup		League Cup		AFC		Total	
Club	Season	Apps	Goals	Apps	Goals	Apps	Goals	Apps	Goals	Apps	Goals
Geylang International	2011	6	1	0	0	0	0	0	0	6	1
Geylang International	2012	16	1	4	0	0	0	0	0	20	1
Geylang International	2013	2	0	0	0	0	0	0	0	2	0
Geylang International	Total	24	2	4	0	0	0	0	0	28	2
Young Lions	2014	10	1	0	0	0	0	0	0	10	1
Young Lions	2015	18	3	0	0	0	0	0	0	18	3
Young Lions	Total	28	4	0	0	0	0	0	0	28	4
Geylang International	2016	17	4	1	0	0	0	0	0	18	4
Geylang International	2017	21	1	1	0	3	2	0	0	25	3
Geylang International	Total	38	5	2	0	3	2	0	0	43	7
Home United	2018	16	2	3	0	0	0	6	0	25	2
Home United	Total	16	2	3	0	0	0	6	0	25	2
Geylang International	2019	23	6	5	0	0	0	0	0	28	6
Geylang International	2020	12	2	0	0	0	0	0	0	12	2
Geylang International	2021	21	12	0	0	0	0	0	0	21	12
Geylang International	Total	56	20	5	0	0	0	0	0	61	20
Hougang United	2022	26	7	6	1	0	0	3	1	35	9
Hougang United	2023	20	6	0	0	1	0	0	0	21	6
Hougang United	Total	46	13	6	1	1	0	3	1	56	15
(Singapore) Albirex Niigata (S)	2024–25	0	0	0	0	0	0	0	0	0	0
(Singapore) Albirex Niigata (S)	Total	0	0	0	0	0	0	0	0	0	0
Career total		207	46	20	1	4	2	9	1	234	50

=== International ===
Appearances and goals by national team and year
National team	Year	Apps	Goals
Singapore
Singapore	2021	6	0
Total		6	0

==== International caps ====
No	Date	Venue	Opponent	Result	Competition
1	11 November 2021	Al Hamriya Sports Club Stadium, Sharjah, UAE	Kyrgyzstan	1-2 (lost)	Friendly
2	5 December 2021	National Stadium, Kallang, Singapore	Myanmar	3-0(won)	2020 AFF Championship
3	14 December 2021	National Stadium, Kallang, Singapore	Timor-Leste	2-0(won)	2020 AFF Championship
4	18 December 2021	National Stadium, Kallang, Singapore	Thailand	0-2(lost)	2020 AFF Championship
5	22 December 2021	National Stadium, Kallang, Singapore	Indonesia	1-1(draw)	2020 AFF Championship
6	25 December 2021	National Stadium, Kallang, Singapore	Indonesia	4-2(lost)	2020 AFF Championship
7	17 December 2022	Jalan Besar Stadium, Kallang, Singapore	Maldives	3-2(lost)	Friendly
8	24 December 2022	Jalan Besar Stadium, Kallang, Singapore	Myanmar	3-2(won)	2022 AFF Championship
9	27 December 2022	New Laos National Stadium, Vientiane, Laos	Laos	2-0(won)	2022 AFF Championship

== Honours ==
=== Club ===
Hougang United

- Singapore Cup: 2022
- Singapore Cup: Runner-ups: 2023
