= Faritz Abdul Hameed =

Singaporean footballer

Faritz Hameed
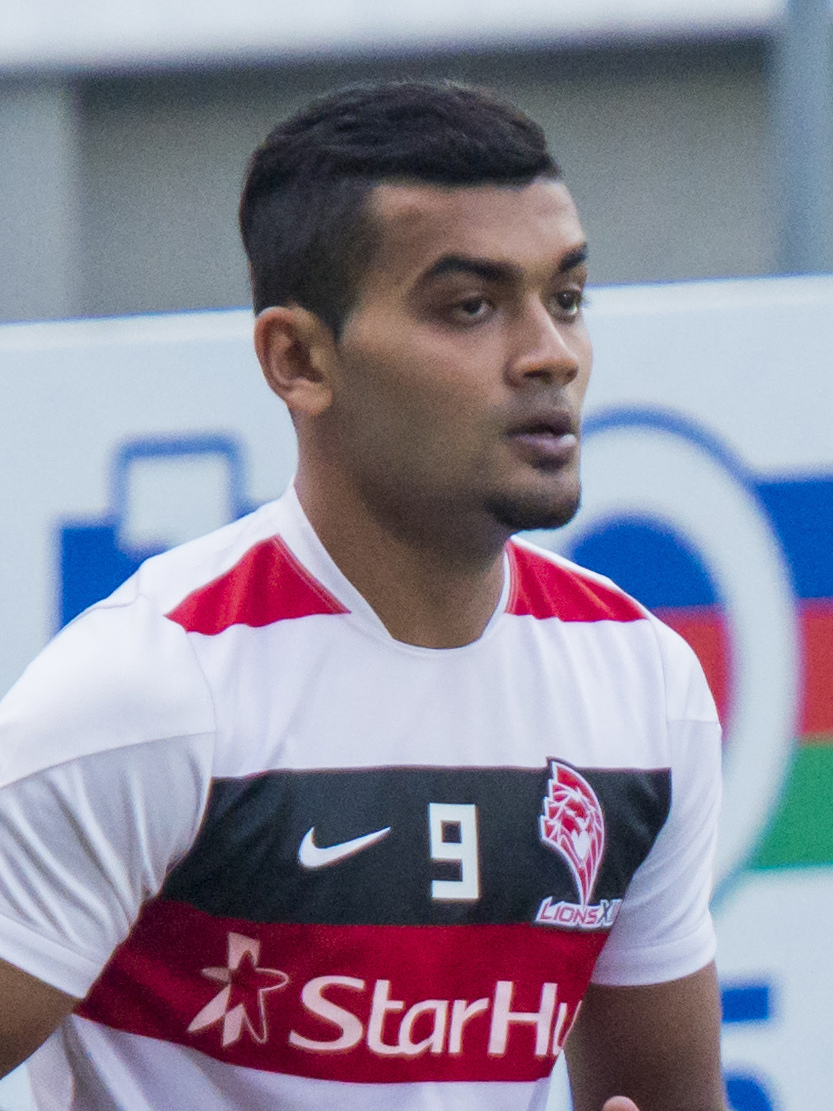
- Faritz warming up before a 2014 MSL game

Personal information
- Full name: Mohammed Faritz bin Abdul Hameed
- Date of birth: 16 January 1990 (age 36)
- Place of birth: Singapore
- Height: 1.76 m (5 ft 9 1/2 in)
- Positions: Centre-back; full-back

Youth career
- National Football Academy

Senior career*
Years	Team	Apps	(Gls)
2009–2012	Young Lions	75	(1)
2013–2015	LionsXII	32	(0)
2016–2017	Geylang International	36	(2)
2018–2019	Home United	18	(2)
2020–2023	Tanjong Pagar United	56	(2)

International career^{‡}
2013–2022	Singapore	33	(0)
Medal record
Men's football
Representing Singapore
Sea Games
Bronze medal – third place	Sea Games 2009	Football
Bronze medal – third place	Sea Games 2013	Football
- * Club domestic league appearances and goals as of 19 August 2017 ‡ National team caps and goals as of 11 June 2019

Mohammed Faritz bin Abdul Hameed (born 16 January 1990) is a Singaporean former footballer who last played as a centre-back or full-back for Singapore Premier League club Tanjong Pagar United and the Singapore national team.

== Club career ==
Faritz began his career with Young Lions in the S.League in 2009, playing four seasons for the club.

In January 2013, he was named in the LionsXII squad for the 2013 Malaysia Super League. He made his debut and first start in a MSL match against ATM on 9 January 2013. Faritz played a further 15 games at the right side of defence as LionsXII finished league winners.

In December 2015, it was announced that Faritz would join Geylang International for the 2016 S.League campaign after the LionsXII was disbanded in 2015.

Faritz joined Tanjong Pagar United in 2021 for the 2022 Singapore Premier League season.

Ending his career in Tanjong Pagar, Faritz announced his retirement from football on 7 June 2023.

== International career ==
Faritz was in the Singapore national under-23 football team that won the bronze medal at the 2009 and 2013 Southeast Asian Games. Faritz made his senior team debut in a friendly match against Myanmar on 6 June 2013. He assisted Khairul Amri's opening goal with a cross from the right flank.

In 2014, Faritz was not selected for the 2014 AFF Championship due to a knee injury.

== Others ==
=== Singapore Selection Squad ===
He was selected as part of the Singapore Selection squad for The Sultan of Selangor’s Cup to be held on 6 May 2017.

== Career statistics ==
=== Club ===
As of match played 5 Jul 22. Caps and goals may not be correct.

Club	Season	S.League		Singapore Cup		Singapore League Cup		Asia		Total	
Club	Season	Apps	Goals	Apps	Goals	Apps	Goals	Apps	Goals	Apps	Goals
Young Lions	2009	23	1	-	-	-	-	—		23	1
Young Lions	2010	20	0	3	0	-	-	—		23	0
Young Lions	2011	8	0	—		—		—		8	0
Young Lions	2012	24	0	—		4	1	—		28	1
Young Lions	Total	75	1	3	0	4	1	0	0	82	2
Club	Season	Malaysia Super League		Malaysia FA Cup		Malaysia Cup		Asia		Total	
LionsXII	2013	16	0	1	0	7	0	—		24	0
LionsXII	2014	16	0	2	0	0	0	—		18	0
LionsXII	2015	??	??	??	??	??	??	—		??	??
LionsXII	Total	32	0	3	0	7	0	0	0	42	0
Club	Season	S.League		Singapore Cup		Singapore League Cup		Asia		Total	
Geylang International	2016	22	2	3	1	0	0	—		25	3
Geylang International	2017	22	1	1	0	4	0	—		27	1
Geylang International	Total	44	3	4	1	4	0	0	0	52	4
Home United	2018	18	2	4	1	0	0	11	2	33	5
Home United	2019	17	1	2	0	0	0	7	0	26	1
Home United	Total	35	3	6	1	0	0	18	2	59	6
Tanjong Pagar United	2020	11	0	0	0	0	0	0	0	11	0
Tanjong Pagar United	2021	19	0	0	0	0	0	0	0	19	0
Tanjong Pagar United	2022	26	2	0	0	0	0	0	0	26	2
Tanjong Pagar United	Total	56	2	0	0	0	0	0	0	56	2
Career total		221	8	14	2	15	1	11	2	261	13

- Young Lions and LionsXII are ineligible for qualification to AFC competitions in their respective leagues.
- Young Lions withdrew from the 2011 and 2012 Singapore Cup, and the 2011 Singapore League Cup due to participation in AFC and AFF youth competitions.

== Honours ==
=== Club ===
Young Lions

- RHB Cup: 2011

LionsXII

- Malaysia Super League: 2013
- Malaysia FA Cup: 2015

Geylang International

- Plate League Cup Champions: 2016

=== International ===
Singapore

- Southeast Asian Games: 2009 (bronze)
- Southeast Asian Games: 2013 (bronze)
