= 2022 Tanjong Pagar United FC season =

Tanjong Pagar United FC
2022 season
- Chairman: (Singapore) Raymond Tang
- Coach: (Singapore) Hasrin Jailani
- Ground: Jurong East Stadium
- Singapore Cup: 6th
- League Cup: Group Stage
- Top goalscorer: League: (Japan) Reo Nishiguchi (26 goals); All: (Japan) Reo Nishiguchi (30 goals)
Home colours	Away colours

The 2022 season was Tanjong Pagar United FC's 17th season at the top level of Singapore football. The club also competed in the Singapore Cup, going out in the group stage.

== Squad ==
=== Singapore Premier League ===
As of 10 Jan 2022

No.	Name	Nationality	Date of birth (age)	Last club	Contract Since	Contract end
Goalkeepers
1	Veer Karan Sobti ^{U23}	(Singapore)	6 May 2004 (age 22)	(Singapore) Lion City Sailors U21	2022	2022
18	Fashah Iskandar	(Singapore)	15 February 1995 (age 31)	(Singapore) Warriors FC	2020	2022
28	Zharfan Rohaizad	(Singapore)	21 February 1997 (age 29)	(Singapore) Young Lions FC	2021	2022
Defenders
2	Faritz Hameed (Captain) ^{>30}	(Singapore)	16 January 1990 (age 36)	(Singapore) Home United	2020	2022
3	Shahrin Saberin	(Singapore)	14 February 1995 (age 31)	(Singapore) Geylang International	2021	2022
5	Emmeric Ong ^{>30}	(Singapore)	25 January 1991 (age 35)	(Singapore) Hougang United	2021	2022
7	Rusyaidi Salime	(Singapore)	25 April 1998 (age 28)	(Singapore) Young Lions FC	2021	2022
8	Daniel Bennett ^{>30}	(Singapore) (England)	7 January 1978 (age 48)	(Singapore) Tampines Rovers	2022	2022
11	Shakir Hamzah	(Singapore)	20 October 1992 (age 33)	(Malaysia) Perak F.C.	2021	2022
13	Aqhari Abdullah ^{>30}	(Singapore)	9 July 1991 (age 35)	(Singapore) Lion City Sailors	2022	2022
40	Akram Azman ^{U23}	(Singapore)	21 November 2000 (age 25)	(Singapore) Tampines Rovers	2022	2022
Midfielders
4	Faizal Raffi	(Singapore)	20 January 1996 (age 30)	(Singapore) Balestier Khalsa	2022	2022
6	Fathullah Rahmat ^{U23}	(Singapore)	5 September 2002 (age 24)	(Singapore) Tampines Rovers	2021	2022
14	Naufal Ilham ^{U23}	(Singapore)	16 August 2002 (age 24)	(Singapore) Lion City Sailors U21	2021	2022
15	Shodai Nishikawa	(Japan)	21 September 1993 (age 33)	(Montenegro) OFK Petrovac	2020	2022
16	Raihan Rahman ^{>30}	(Singapore)	7 February 1991 (age 35)	(Singapore) Balestier Khalsa	2020	2022
17	Ryan Syaffiq	(Singapore)	4 March 1995 (age 31)	(Singapore) Tiong Bahru FC	2022	2022
20	Blake Ricciuto	(Australia) (Uruguay) (Italy)	2 September 1992 (age 34)	(Spain) Vélez CF	2021	2022
21	Mirko Šugić	(Croatia)	25 April 1994 (age 32)	(Croatia) NK Dubrava	2022	2022
Forwards
9	Reo Nishiguchi	(Japan)	21 August 1997 (age 29)	(Japan) Albirex Niigata (S)	2021	2022
10	Syukri Bashir	(Singapore)	11 April 1998 (age 28)	(Singapore) Young Lions FC	2020	2022
12	Khairul Nizam ^{>30}	(Singapore)	25 June 1991 (age 35)	(Singapore) Hougang United	2022	2022
19	Khairul Amri ^{>30}	(Singapore)	14 March 1985 (age 41)	(Malaysia) FELDA United	2021	2022
Players loaned out / left during season
22	Hadiputradila Saswadimata ^{U23}	(Singapore)	5 February 2000 (age 26)	(Singapore) Home United U19	2020	2022

=== Women Squad ===
As of 14 Mar 2021

No.	Name	Nationality	Date of birth (age)	Last club	Contract Since	Contract end
Goalkeepers
1	Sofea Idayu Ishak	(Singapore)				2022
18	Nurul Haziqah	(Singapore)				2022
Defenders
3	Nur Adrianna Hazeri	(Singapore)				2022
5	Rena Lim Shu Ting	(Singapore)				2022
7	Sharda Parvin	(Singapore)				2022
11	Alyssa Deanna Yazrin	(Singapore)				2022
14	Tressa Jane Fernandez	(Singapore)		(Singapore) Petra FC		2022
22	Yvonne Ang Li Na	(Singapore)				2022
24	Imai Nagomi	(Japan)			2018	2022
Midfielders
4	Tan Xin Yi	(Singapore)				2022
6	Shahidah Lam	(Singapore)				2022
8	Rosairiani Suhairi	(Singapore)	15 September 2003 (age 23)			2022
9	Manami Fukuzawa	(Japan)			2018	2022
12	Erlysha Khairil	(Singapore)				2022
13	Nur Insyiarah Perwaz	(Singapore)				2022
15	Lim Ira Maon	(Malaysia)				2022
16	Nur Batrisyia Baharudin	(Singapore)				2022
17	Nicole Ng Wen Sui	(Singapore)				2022
21	Madeleine Lim Qian Yu	(Singapore)				2022
25	Nurin Zailani	(Singapore)				2022
Forwards
2	Yuki Monden	(Japan)		(Singapore) Police SA	2019	2022
10	Nuriah Mohamed Noor	(Singapore)				2022
19	Nurul Fatin Shukran	(Singapore)				2022
23	Farah Nurzahirah	(Singapore)				2022

== Coaching staff ==
Position	Name	Ref.
Chairman	(Singapore) Raymond Tang	
General Manager	(Singapore) Desmund Khusnin	
Team Manager	(Singapore) Noh Alam Shah	
Head Coach	(Singapore) Hasrin Jailani	
Head Coach (Women)	(Singapore) Samawira Basri	
Assistant Coach	(Singapore) Herman Zailani	
Goalkeeping Coach	(Singapore) Fajar Sarib	
Assistant Team Manager; Striker Coach; Video Analyst	(Singapore) Indra Sahdan	
Head of Youth	(Singapore) Abdul Musawir	
Fitness Coach	(Singapore) Hafiz Osman	
Physiotherapist	(Singapore) Fadhli Hussein	
Sport Trainer	(Singapore) Mukhlis Sawit	
Kitman	(Singapore) Azwan Hishamuddin	

== Transfers ==
=== In ===
Preseason

Position	Player	Transferred From	Ref
FW	(Singapore) Syukri Bashir	(Singapore) SAFSA	End of NS
DF	(Singapore) Daniel Bennett	(Singapore) Tampines Rovers	Free
DF	(Singapore) Aqhari Abdullah	(Singapore) Lion City Sailors	Free
DF	(Singapore) Akram Azman	Free Agent	End of NS
MF	(Croatia) Mirko Sugic	(Croatia) NK Dubrava (C2)	Undisclosed
MF	(Singapore) Faizal Raffi	(Singapore) Balestier Khalsa	Free
MF	(Singapore) Ryan Syaffiq	(Singapore) Tiong Bahru FC	Free
MF	(Singapore) Haziq Jalal	(Singapore) Tampines Rovers U21	Free
MF	(Singapore) Suriya Ramesh	(Singapore) Balestier Khalsa U21	Free
FW	(Singapore) Khairul Nizam	(Singapore) Hougang United	Free
FW	(Singapore) Joshua De Souza	(Singapore) Balestier Khalsa U21	Free

=== Loan In ===
Position	Player	Transferred From	Ref
GK	(Singapore) Veer Karan Sobti	(Singapore) Lion City Sailors U21	Season loan

=== Loan Return ===
Position	Player	Transferred To	Ref
FW	(Singapore) Anaqi Ismit	(Singapore) Lion City Sailors U21	Loan Return

=== Out ===
Preseason

Position	Player	Transferred To	Ref
GK	(Singapore) Hariz Farid	(Singapore) Yishun Sentek Mariners (SFL1)	Free
DF	(Singapore) Delwinder Singh	(Singapore) Balestier Khalsa	Free
DF	(Singapore) Prakash Raj	(Singapore)	Free
DF	(Singapore) Shahib Masnawi	(Singapore)	Free
DF	(Singapore) Julian Tan Jian Tang	Singapore Cricket Club FC (SFL2)	Free
MF	(Singapore) Suhairi Sabri	(Singapore) Yishun Sentek Mariners FC (SFL1)	Free
MF	(Singapore) Ammirul Emmran	(Singapore) Balestier Khalsa	Free
MF	(Singapore) Ridhuan Muhammad	NA	Retired
FW	(Brazil) Luiz Júnior	(El Salvador) C.D. Águila (E1)	Free
FW	(Singapore) Daniel Martens	(Singapore)	Free
FW	(Singapore) Syahadat Masnawi	(Singapore) GFA Sporting Westlake (SFL1)	Free

Mid-season

Position	Player	Transferred To	Ref
MF	(Singapore) Suriya Ramesh	(Singapore) Yishun FC (IWL)	Free

=== Loan Out ===
Preseason

Position	Player	Transferred To	Ref
GK	(Singapore) Kenji Syed Rusydi	(Singapore) SAFSA	NS till 2022
MF	(Singapore) Efly Danish	(Singapore) SAFSA	NS till 2023
FW	(Singapore) Hadiputradila Saswadimata	(Singapore) SAFSA	NS till 2024

=== Extension / Retained ===
Position	Player	Ref
GK	(Singapore) Zharfan Rohaizad	1 year contract till 2022
GK	(Singapore) Fashah Iskandar	1 year contract till 2022
DF	(Singapore) Faritz Hameed	1 year contract till 2022
DF	(Singapore) Shahrin Saberin	1 year contract till 2022
DF	(Singapore) Rusyaidi Salime	1 year contract till 2022
DF	(Singapore) Shakir Hamzah	1 year contract till 2022
DF	(Singapore) Emmeric Ong	1 year contract till 2022
MF	(Singapore) Naufal Ilham	1 year contract till 2022 (U21)
MF	(Singapore) Fathullah Rahmat	1 year contract till 2022 (U21)
MF	(Japan) Shodai Nishikawa	1 year contract till 2022
MF	(Singapore) Raihan Rahman	1 year contract till 2022
MF	(Singapore) Hadiputradila Saswadimata	1 year contract till 2022
MF	(Australia) Blake Ricciuto	1 year contract till 2022
FW	(Japan) Reo Nishiguchi	1 year contract till 2022
FW	(Singapore) Khairul Amri	1 year contract till 2022

== Friendlies ==
=== Pre-season ===
Win Draw Loss

15 January 2022 1	Tampines Rovers (Singapore)	3–2	(Singapore) Tanjong Pagar United	Tampines
	Christopher van Huizen; Taufik Suparno; Boris Kopitović	Report	Mirko Sugic (pen.)	Stadium: Our Tampines Hub

15 January 2022 2	Tampines Rovers (Singapore)	5–1	(Singapore) Tanjong Pagar United	Tampines
	Ong Yu En; Amirul Haikal; Jovan Ang; Matthias Koesno	Report	Goal	Stadium: Our Tampines Hub

29 January 2022 3	Tanjong Pagar United (Singapore)	1–3	(Singapore) Young Lions FC	Jurong East
	Goal		Jacob Mahler (pen.); Daniel Goh	Stadium: Jurong East Stadium

10 February 2022 4	Tanjong Pagar United (Singapore)	8–1	(Singapore) Balestier Khalsa	Jurong East
				Stadium: Jurong East Stadium

20 February 2022 5	Hougang United (Singapore)	v	(Singapore) Tanjong Pagar United	Hougang
				Stadium: Hougang Stadium

=== In-season ===
Win Draw Loss

1 May 2022 1	Tanjong Pagar United (Singapore)	1–2	(Singapore) Tampines Rovers	Jurong East
	Goal		Taufik Suparno; Matthias Josaphat Koesno	Stadium: Jurong East Stadium

25 May 2022 2	Tanjong Pagar United (Singapore)	v	(Singapore) Yishun Sentek Mariners	Jurong East
				Stadium: Jurong East Stadium

5 June 2022 3	Persib Bandung (Indonesia)	6–1	(Singapore) Tanjong Pagar United	Batam, Indonesia
	Ezra Walian; Ciro Alves; David da Silva; Febri Hariyadi			Stadium: Gelora Citramas Stadium

16 November 2022 4	Persis Solo (Indonesia)	5–2	(Singapore) Tanjong Pagar United	Johor, Malaysia
	Irfan Jauhari 12'; Ferdinand Sinaga 36' 50'; Fernando Rodríguez 63'; Arapenta Poerba 65'		Daniel Bennett 8' (pen.); Syukri Bashir 48'	Stadium: Larkin Stadium

== Team statistics ==
=== Appearances and goals ===
As of 6 Nov 2022

Numbers in parentheses denote appearances as substitute.

No.	Pos.	Player	SPL		Singapore Cup		Total	
No.	Pos.	Player	Apps.	Goals	Apps.	Goals	Apps.	Goals
2	DF	(Singapore) Faritz Hameed	25+1	2	0	0	26	2
3	DF	(Singapore) Shahrin Saberin	4+5	0	3	0	12	0
4	MF	(Singapore) Faizal Raffi	5+12	1	0+3	0	20	1
5	DF	(Singapore) Emmeric Ong	12+3	0	0+1	0	16	0
6	MF	(Singapore) Fathullah Rahmat	18+5	0	3	0	26	0
7	DF	(Singapore) Rusyaidi Salime	16+5	1	1+1	0	23	1
8	DF	(Singapore) Daniel Bennett	12+5	1	1	0	18	1
9	FW	(Japan) Reo Nishiguchi	26+1	26	3	4	30	30
10	FW	(Singapore) Syukri Bashir	7+8	0	0+1	0	16	0
11	DF	(Singapore) Shakir Hamzah	1+3	0	2	0	6	0
12	FW	(Singapore) Khairul Nizam	3+13	5	0+2	0	18	5
13	DF	(Singapore) Aqhari Abdullah	25+2	0	3	0	30	0
14	MF	(Singapore) Naufal Ilham	2+3	0	0	0	5	0
15	MF	(Japan) Shodai Nishikawa	26+1	5	3	0	30	5
16	MF	(Singapore) Raihan Rahman	23+1	1	3	0	27	1
17	MF	(Singapore) Ryan Syaffiq	0+3	0	0	0	3	0
18	GK	(Singapore) Fashah Iskandar	2	0	0	0	2	0
19	FW	(Singapore) Khairul Amri	10+12	5	2	1	24	6
20	MF	(Australia) Blake Ricciuto	25+1	6	3	1	29	7
21	MF	(Croatia) Mirko Šugić	24+1	5	2+1	0	28	5
28	GK	(Singapore) Zharfan Rohaizad	23	0	3	0	26	0
40	DF	(Singapore) Akram Azman	15+3	0	1	0	19	0
59	MF	(Singapore) Azim Akbar	1+1	0	0	0	2	0
Players who have played this season but had left the club or on loan to other club
1	GK	(Singapore) Veer Karan Sobti	1	0	0	0	1	0
22	MF	(Singapore) Hadiputradila Saswadimata	0+2	0	0	0	2	0

== Competitions ==
=== Overview ===
Competition	Record							
Competition	P	W	D	L	GF	GA	GD	Win %

=== Singapore Premier League ===
Win Draw Loss

25 February 2022 1	Albirex Niigata (S) (Japan)	0–2	(Singapore) Tanjong Pagar United	Jurong East
	Kodai Tanaka (yellow card) 48'; Kumpei Kakuta (yellow card) 81'	Report	Reo Nishiguchi 1' 10'; Aqhari Abdullah (yellow card) 58'; Raihan Rahman (yellow card) 61'	Stadium: Jurong East Stadium; Attendance: 728; Referee: Taufik Thana

6 March 2022 2	Tanjong Pagar United (Singapore)	2–2	(Singapore) Hougang United	Jurong East
	Khairul Nizam 72'; Shodai Nishikawa 88'; Reo Nishiguchi (yellow card) 59'	Report	Nazrul Nazari 77'; Kaishu Yamazaki 79'; Nazhiim Harman (yellow card) 13'; Muhaimin Suhaimi (yellow card) 62'; Khairul Amri (yellow card) 90+1'	Stadium: Jurong East Stadium; Referee: Jansen Foo

12 March 2022 3	Balestier Khalsa (Singapore)	3–5	(Singapore) Tanjong Pagar United	Toa Payoh
	Kuraba Kondo 23'; Ryoya Tanigushi 27'; Shuhei Hoshino 32'	Report	Khairul Amri 10'; Blake Ricciuto 18'; Mario Sugic 50' 59' (yellow card) 14'; Reo Nishiguchi 82'; Faritz Hameed (yellow card) 19'	Stadium: Toa Payoh Stadium; Referee: Clarence Leow Hong Wei

19 March 2022 4	Tanjong Pagar United (Singapore)	1–1	(Singapore) Geylang International	Jurong East
	Reo Nishiguchi 63'; Aqhari Abdullah (yellow card) 10'; Mario Sugic (yellow card) 25'; Naufal Ilham (yellow card) 68'; Raihan Rahman (yellow card) 90'	Report	Hazzuwan Halim 74'; Takahiro Tezuka (yellow card) 40'	Stadium: Jurong East Stadium; Referee: Ahmad A'qashah

2 April 2022 5	Young Lions FC (Singapore)	2–3	(Singapore) Tanjong Pagar United	Jalan Besar
	Zulqarnaen Suzliman 3'; Ilhan Fandi 30' (pen.); Syahrul Sazali (yellow card) 34'	Report	Khairul Amri 9' (yellow card) 85'; Faritz Hameed 41' (yellow card) 72'; Faizal Raffi 67'; Raihan Rahman (yellow card) 31'; Blake Ricciuto (yellow card) 82'	Stadium: Jalan Besar Stadium; Referee: Hilmi Fuad

6 April 2022 6	Tampines Rovers (Singapore)	3–3	(Singapore) Tanjong Pagar United	Tampines
	Faritz Abdul Hameed 12' (o.g.); Boris Kopitović 19'; Christopher van Huizen 64'; Kyoga Nakamura (yellow card) 72'; Ryan Sanizal (yellow card) 79'; Irwan Shah (yellow card) 87'	Report	Reo Nishiguchi 68' (pen.) 75'; Mario Sugic 90+3' (yellow card) 90+3'; Raihan Rahman (yellow card) 59'; Faritz Hameed (yellow card) 70'; Rusyaidi Salime (yellow card) 84'	Stadium: Our Tampines Hub; Referee: Taufik Thana

9 April 2022 7	Lion City Sailors (Singapore)	6–1	(Singapore) Tanjong Pagar United	Jalan Besar
	Diego Lopes 9' 28'; Shahdan Sulaiman 33'; Kim Shin-wook 46'; Hafiz Nor 73'; Maxime Lestienne 90+1'	Report	Pedro Henrique 71' (o.g.); Fathullah Rahmat (yellow card) 25'; Rusyaidi Salime (yellow card) 51'; Emmeric Ong (yellow card) 53'	Stadium: Jalan Besar Stadium; Referee: Muhammad Taqi

7 May 2022 8	Tanjong Pagar United (Singapore)	1–2	(Japan) Albirex Niigata (S)	Jurong East
	Reo Nishiguchi 22'; Raihan Rahman (yellow card) 45'; Blake Ricciuto (yellow card) 48'; Aqhari Abdullah (yellow card) 80'	Report	Kodai Tanaka 33'; Masaya Idetsu 45+2'; Kan Kobayashi (yellow card) 90'	Stadium: Jurong East Stadium; Referee: Jansen Foo

14 May 2022 9	Hougang United (Singapore)	1–1	(Singapore) Tanjong Pagar United	Hougang
	Pedro Bortoluzo 90+3'; Nazhiim Harman (yellow card) 29'; Andre Moritz (yellow card) 39'	Report	Reo Nishiguchi 90'; Aqhari Abdullah (yellow card) 10'; Faritz Hameed (yellow card) 39'; Akram Azman (yellow card) 63'	Stadium: Hougang Stadium; Referee: Andrea Verolino

20 May 2022 10	Tanjong Pagar United (Singapore)	1–0	(Singapore) Balestier Khalsa	Jurong East
	Reo Nishiguchi 37'; Fathullah Rahmat (yellow card) 20'; Faizal Raffi (red card) 90'	Report	Shuhei Hoshino (yellow card) 18'; Ammirul Emmran (yellow card) 62'	Stadium: Jurong East Stadium; Referee: Hilmi Fuad

28 May 2022 11	Tanjong Pagar United (Singapore)	4–2	(Singapore) Tampines Rovers	Jurong East
	Reo Nishiguchi 5' 32'; Rusyaidi Salime 21'; Shodai Nishikawa 38'; Khairul Amri (yellow card) 60'; Fathullah Rahmat (yellow card) 90'	Report	Firdaus Kasman 22'; Zehrudin Mehmedović 36'; Marc Ryan Tan (yellow card) 79'	Stadium: Jurong East Stadium; Referee: Andrea Verolino

18 June 2022 12	Tanjong Pagar United (Singapore)	2–0	(Singapore) Young Lions FC	Jurong East
	Reo Nishiguchi 40'; Faritz Hameed 49'	Report	Jared Gallagher (yellow card) 83'	Stadium: Jurong East Stadium; Referee: Abirami Naidu

26 June 2022 13	Geylang International (Singapore)	1–0	(Singapore) Tanjong Pagar United	Tampines
	Vincent Bezecourt 5' (yellow card) 87'; Takahiro Tezuka (yellow card) 67'; Huzaifah Aziz (yellow card) 74'; Hazzuwan Halim (yellow card) 82'	Report	Raihan Rahman (yellow card) 49'; Faritz Hameed (yellow card) 67'; Reo Nishiguchi (yellow card) 67'; Blake Ricciuto (yellow card) 67'	Stadium: Our Tampines Hub; Referee: Muhammad Taqi

3 July 2022 14	Tanjong Pagar United (Singapore)	0–6	(Singapore) Lion City Sailors	Jurong East
	Rusyaidi Salime (yellow card) 84'	Report	Maxime Lestienne 2'; Gabriel Quak 15' 54'; Hariss Harun 18'; Diego Lopes 52' 56'; Adam Swandi (yellow card) 90'	Stadium: Jurong East Stadium; Referee: Andrea Verolino

8 July 2022 15	Albirex Niigata (S) (Japan)	1–2	(Singapore) Tanjong Pagar United	Jurong East
	Ilhan Fandi 8'; Keito Hariya (yellow card) 78'; Yoshiki Matsuura (yellow card) 90'	Report	Reo Nishiguchi 90' (yellow card) 42'; Khairul Nizam 90+2'; Emmeric Ong (yellow card) 44'; Fathullah Rahmat (yellow card) 54'	Stadium: Jurong East Stadium; Referee: Abirami Naidu

17 July 2022 16	Tanjong Pagar United (Singapore)	2–2	(Singapore) Hougang United	Jurong East
	Raihan Rahman 6'; Reo Nishiguchi 38'; Mirko Šugić (yellow card) 38'; Faritz Hameed (yellow card) 54'	Report	Shawal Anuar 8'; Pedro Bortoluzo 57' (pen.); Sahil Suhaimi (yellow card) 38'	Stadium: Jurong East Stadium; Referee: Jansen Foo

23 July 2022 17	Balestier Khalsa (Singapore)	0–2	(Singapore) Tanjong Pagar United	Toa Payoh
	Daniel Goh (yellow card) 4'; Ryoya Tanigushi (yellow card) 54'; Ensar Brunčević (yellow card) 90'	Report	Reo Nishiguchi 28' 78'; Rusyaidi Salime (yellow card) 32'; Raihan Rahman (yellow card) 54'; Fathullah Rahmat (yellow card) 62'	Stadium: Toa Payoh Stadium; Referee: Muhammad Taqi

30 July 2022 18	Tanjong Pagar United (Singapore)	0–5	(Singapore) Geylang International	Jurong East
	Faizal Raffi (yellow card) 39'	Report	Vincent Bezecourt 2' 56'; Takahiro Tezuka 22'; Šime Žužul 24'; Rio Sakuma 67'	Stadium: Jurong East Stadium; Referee: Andrea Verolino

7 August 2022 19	Young Lions FC (Singapore)	4–2	(Singapore) Tanjong Pagar United	Jalan Besar
	Zikos Vasileios Chua 22' 30' 45' 52' (yellow card) 90+2'	Report	Khairul Amri 38'; Reo Nishiguchi 70'; Akram Amzal (red card) 19'; Khairul Nizam (yellow card) 52'; Emmeric Ong (yellow card) 90+2'	Stadium: Jalan Besar Stadium; Referee: Jansen Foo

13 August 2022 20	Tanjong Pagar United (Singapore)	3–4	(Singapore) Tampines Rovers	Jurong East
	Shodai Nishikawa 2'; Reo Nishiguchi 36' (pen.) 67' (pen.); Faizal Raffi 86'; Blake Ricciuto 90'	Report	Boris Kopitović 40'; Christopher van Huizen 42'; Yasir Hanapi 52'; Shuya Yamashita 78'; Irwan Shah (yellow card) 65'	Stadium: Jurong East Stadium; Referee: Hilmi Fuad

20 August 2022 21	Lion City Sailors (Singapore)	7–0	(Singapore) Tanjong Pagar United	Jalan Besar
	Maxime Lestienne 17'; Hafiz Nor 45'; Gabriel Quak 53'; Kim Shin-wook 58'; Diego Lopes 68' (pen.); Song Ui-young 74'; Diego Lopes 87'	Report	Khairul Amri (yellow card) 85'	Stadium: Jalan Besar Stadium; Referee: Taufik Thana

27 August 2022 22	Tanjong Pagar United (Singapore)	1–2	(Japan) Albirex Niigata (S)	Jurong East
	Blake Ricciuto 86' (yellow card) 90+1'; Akram Azman (yellow card) 90'	Report	Kumpei Kakuta 56'; Ilhan Fandi 73'; Masaya Idetsu (yellow card) 54'	Stadium: Jurong East Stadium; Referee: Jansen Foo

3 September 2022 23	Hougang United (Singapore)	3–3	(Singapore) Tanjong Pagar United	Hougang
	Shawal Anuar 10' 40'; Fabian Kwok (yellow card) 31'; Pedro Bortoluzo 90' (yellow card) 34'; Afiq Noor (yellow card) 55'	Report	Daniel Bennett 25'; Shodai Nishikawa 30'; Reo Nishiguchi 31' (pen.); Raihan Rahman (yellow card) 34'	Stadium: Hougang Stadium; Referee: Muhammad Taqi

9 September 2022 24	Tanjong Pagar United (Singapore)	3–1	(Singapore) Balestier Khalsa	Jurong East
	Mirko Šugić 28'; Blake Ricciuto 61'; Khairul Amri 71'	Report	Ryoya Tanigushi 82'; Madhu Mohana (yellow card) 57'; Ammirul Emmran (yellow card) 60'; Gareth Low (yellow card) 90+2'	Stadium: Jurong East Stadium; Referee: Andrea Verolino

20 October 2022 25 (Rescheduled)	Tampines Rovers (Singapore)	4–3	(Singapore) Tanjong Pagar United	Tampines
	Yasir Hanapi 19'; Joel Chew 90+2'; Boris Kopitović 61' (pen.) 73' (pen.); Irwan Shah (yellow card) 37'	Report	Blake Ricciuto 14'; Mirko Šugić 27'; Khairul Nizam 75'; Shahrin Saberin (yellow card) 88'	Stadium: Our Tampines Hub; Referee: Muhammad Taqi

1 October 2022 26	Tanjong Pagar United (Singapore)	8–1	(Singapore) Young Lions FC	Jurong East
	Reo Nishiguchi 3' (pen.) 8' (pen.) 53' (pen.) 79' 82'; Khairul Amri 45'; Blake Ricciuto 50' (yellow card) 44'; Khairul Nizam 70'; Rusyaidi Salime (yellow card) 65'	Report	Rasaq Akeem 66' (pen.); Fairuz Fazli Koh (yellow card) 2'	Stadium: Jurong East Stadium; Referee: Hilmi Fuad

9 October 2022 27	Geylang International (Singapore)	3–3	(Singapore) Tanjong Pagar United	Tampines
	Vincent Bezecourt 31' 90+3'; Shakir Hamzah 41' (o.g.); Huzaifah Aziz (yellow card) 25' (yellow-red card) 57'	Report	Blake Ricciuto 64' (yellow card) 90+5'; Khairul Nizam 72'; Reo Nishiguchi 89'; Raihan Rahman (yellow card) 27'; Rusyaidi Salime (yellow card) 45'; Shakir Hamzah (yellow card) 90+1'	Stadium: Our Tampines Hub; Referee: Andrea Verolino

14 October 2022 28 (Rescheduled)	Tanjong Pagar United (Singapore)	1–3	(Singapore) Lion City Sailors	Jurong East
	Shodai Nishikawa 72'; Fathullah Rahmat (yellow card) 59'; Faizal Raffi (yellow card) 90+1'	Report	Diego Lopes 17'; Gabriel Quak 74' 89'; Haifz Nor (yellow card) 22'; Maxime Lestienne (yellow card) 42'	Stadium: Jurong East Stadium; Referee: Jansen Foo

Pos	Team	Pld	W	D	L	GF	GA	GD	Pts	Qualification or relegation
4	Geylang International	28	10	9	9	48	46	+2	39	
5	Hougang United	28	10	9	9	65	71	−6	39	Qualification for AFC Cup group stage (Cup Winner)
6	Tanjong Pagar United	28	10	7	11	59	69	−10	37	
7	Balestier Khalsa	28	7	3	18	45	78	−33	24	
8	Young Lions (Note: The foreign club – Albirex Niigata (S) – as well as the Football Association of Singapore (FAS) under-21 team, Young Lions, are ineligible for any AFC competition spots.)	28	2	2	24	34	103	−69	8	

Source: Singapore Premier League
Rules for classification: 1) points; 2) goal difference; 3) number of goals scored; 4) number of wins

=== Singapore Cup ===
Pos	Team	Pld	W	D	L	GF	GA	GD	Pts	Qualification
1	Tampines Rovers (Q)	3	2	0	1	7	4	+3	6	Semi-finals
2	Hougang United (Q)	3	2	0	1	6	4	+2	6	Semi-finals
3	Tanjong Pagar United	3	2	0	1	6	6	0	6	
4	Geylang International	3	0	0	3	4	9	−5	0	

Updated to match(es) played on 25 September 2022. Source: FAS
(Q) Qualified for the phase indicated

Win Draw Loss

==== Group ====
28 October 2022 Match 1	Tanjong Pagar United (Singapore)	3–1	(Singapore) Hougang United	Jurong East
	Blake Ricciuto 45' (yellow card) 21'; Reo Nishiguchi 69' 71' (yellow card) 73'	Report	Sahil Suhaimi 17'; Lionel Tan (yellow card) 32'; Muhaimin Suhaimi (yellow card) 57'; Zulfahmi Arifin (yellow card) 73'; Pedro Bortoluzo (yellow card) 90' (yellow-red card) 90+1'	Stadium: Jurong East Stadium; Referee: Hilmi Fuad

1 November 2022 Match 2	Tampines Rovers (Singapore)	4–1	(Singapore) Tanjong Pagar United	Tampines
	Yasir Hanapi 15'; Boris Kopitović 26'; Kyoga Nakamura 60'; Taufik Suparno 72'; Zehrudin Mehmedović (yellow card) 22'; Ryaan Sanizal (yellow card) 88'	Report	Reo Nishiguchi 23' (penalty missed) 88; Shahrin Saberin (yellow card) 58'; Raihan Rahman (yellow card) 71'; Rusyaidi Salime (yellow card) 84'; Shakir Hamzah (yellow card) 85'	Stadium: Our Tampines Hub; Referee: Ahmad A'qashah

6 November 2022 Match 3	Tanjong Pagar United (Singapore)	2–1	(Singapore) Geylang International	Jurong East
	Khairul Amri 43'; Reo Nishiguchi 56'; Rusyaidi Salime (yellow card) 34'; Raihan Rahman (yellow card) 42'	Report	Hazzuwan Halim 41'	Stadium: Jurong East Stadium; Referee: Shadiq Al-Hussain

== Competition (WPL) ==
=== WPL League ===
Win Draw Loss

28 May 2022 1	Tanjong Pagar United (Singapore)	2–1	(Japan) Albirex Niigata (S) FC	Yishun
				Stadium: Yishun Stadium

5 June 2022 2	Tanjong Pagar United (Singapore)	5–0	(Singapore) Balestier Khalsa	Yishun
				Stadium: Yishun Stadium

11 June 2022 3	Tanjong Pagar United (Singapore)	4–1	(Singapore) Hougang United	Yishun
				Stadium: Yishun Stadium

18 June 2022 4	Tanjong Pagar United (Singapore)	1–3	(Singapore) Still Aerion Women	Yishun
				Stadium: Yishun Stadium

17 July 2022 5	Tanjong Pagar United (Singapore)	2–1	(Singapore) Tiong Bahru	Yishun
				Stadium: Yishun Stadium

31 July 2022 6	Tanjong Pagar United (Singapore)	0–0	(Singapore) Lion City Sailors	Yishun
				Stadium: Yishun Stadium

6 August 2022 7	Tanjong Pagar United (Singapore)	1–2	(Japan) Albirex Niigata (S) FC	Yishun
				Stadium: Yishun Stadium

13 August 2022 8	Tanjong Pagar United (Singapore)	0–0	(Singapore) Balestier Khalsa	Yishun
				Stadium: Yishun Stadium

20 August 2022 9	Tanjong Pagar United (Singapore)	5–1	(Singapore) Hougang United	Yishun
				Stadium: Yishun Stadium

27 August 2022 10	Tanjong Pagar United (Singapore)	2–0	(Singapore) Still Aerion Women	Yishun
				Stadium: Yishun Stadium
