= 2020 Balestier Khalsa FC season =

Balestier Khalsa
2020 season
- Chairman: S Thavaneson
- Head coach: Marko Kraljević
- Stadium: Bishan Stadium
- Singapore Cup: –

The 2020 season was Balestier Khalsa's 25th consecutive season in the top flight of Singapore football and in the Singapore Premier League and the Singapore Cup.

== Squad ==
=== Sleague Squad ===
As of 21 September 2018.

No.	Name	Nationality	Date of birth (age)	Previous club	Contract Since	Contract End
Goalkeepers
1	Zacharial Leong ^{U23}	(Singapore)	6 April 1998 (age 28)	Youth Team	2019	2020
19	Zaiful Nizam ^{>30}	(Singapore)	24 July 1987 (age 39)	(Singapore) Gombak United	2013	2020
23	Hafiz Ahmad ^{U23}	(Singapore)	30 December 1998 (age 27)	(Singapore) Project Vaults FC	2021	2021
Defenders
2	Fadli Kamis	(Singapore)	7 November 1992 (age 34)	(Singapore) Young Lions FC	2016	2020
3	Jufri Taha ^{>30}	(Singapore)	4 March 1985 (age 41)	(Singapore) Geylang International	2020	2020
4	Khalili Khalif ^{U23}	(Singapore)	3 January 1997 (age 29)	(Singapore) Home United U21	2018	2020
5	Ensar Brunčević	(Serbia)	13 February 1999 (age 27)	(Serbia) FK Spartak Subotica II (T2)	2020	2020
15	R Aaravin	(Singapore)	24 February 1996 (age 30)	(Singapore) Warriors FC	2020	
18	Ahmad Syahir	(Singapore)	10 April 1992 (age 34)	Youth Team	2013	2020
21	Yeo Hai Ngee	(Singapore)	12 January 1995 (age 31)	(Singapore) Warriors FC	2020	2020
32	Danish Uwais ^{U23}	(Singapore)	10 October 1997 (age 29)	(Singapore) Tiong Bahru FC (NFL)	2020	2020
39	Aiman Zavyan ^{U23}	(Singapore)	7 June 2002 (age 24)	(Singapore) Geylang International U19	2020	2020
45	Christian Chiang Moroni ^{U23}	(Singapore) (Italy)	22 January 2001 (age 25)	(Singapore) Hougang United U19	2020	2020
Midfielders
6	Aarish Kumar ^{U23}	(Singapore)	19 May 1999 (age 27)	(Singapore) Warriors FC	2020	2020
8	Kristijan Krajcek	(Croatia)	1 October 1993 (age 33)	(Croatia) NK BSK Bijelo Brdo (T2)	2019	2020
11	Karthik Raj ^{U23}	(Singapore)	1 August 1997 (age 29)	Youth Team	2020	2020
12	Jordan Efe Okwudili Emaviwe ^{U23}	(Singapore) (Nigeria)	9 April 2001 (age 25)		2020	2020
17	Zulfadhmi Suzliman	(Singapore)	10 February 1996 (age 30)	(Singapore) Tampines Rovers	2020	
22	Elijah Lim Teck Yong ^{U23}	(Singapore)	8 May 2001 (age 25)	(Singapore) Tampines Rovers U19	2020	2020
26	Faizal Raffi	(Singapore)	20 January 1996 (age 30)	(Singapore) Warriors FC	2020	2020
Forwards
7	Hazzuwan Halim	(Singapore)	2 February 1994 (age 32)	(Singapore) Tanjong Pagar United	2015	2021
9	Shuhei Hoshino	(Japan)	19 December 1995 (age 30)	(South Korea) Busan Transportation FC (T3)	2020	2020
10	Šime Žužul	(Croatia)	10 January 1996 (age 30)	(Croatia) NK Hrvatski Dragovoljac (T2)	2019	2021
28	Syukri Noorhaizam ^{U23}	(Singapore)	14 December 1999 (age 26)	(Singapore) Tiong Bahru FC (NFL)	2020	2020

== Coaching staff ==
Position	Name
Team Manager	Darwin Jalil
General Manager	Tim Nee Cheng
Head Coach	(Croatia) Marko Kraljević
Assistant Coach	Nasaruddin Jalil
Assistant Coach	Nasruldin Baharuddin
Goalkeeping Coach	Yazid Yasin
Fitness Coach	Rosman Sulaiman
Physiotherapist	Mohamed Nasser
Kitman	

== Transfer ==
=== Pre-season transfer ===
==== In ====
Position	Player	Transferred From	Ref
GK	(Singapore) Martyn Mun	(Singapore) Jungfrau Punggol FC	Free
GK	(Singapore) Oliver Sim	(Singapore) Home United U21	Free
DF	(Singapore) Jufri Taha	(Singapore) Geylang International	Free
DF	(Serbia) Ensar Brunčević	(Serbia) FK Spartak Subotica II	Free
DF	(Singapore) Danish Uwais	(Singapore) Tiong Bahru FC (NFL)	Free
DF	(Singapore) Aiman Zavyan	(Singapore) Geylang International U21	Free
DF	(Singapore) (Italy) Christian Chiang Moroni	(Singapore) Hougang United U21	Free
DF	(Singapore) Yeo Hai Ngee	(Singapore) Warriors FC	Free
MF	(Singapore) Noor Akid Nordin	(Singapore) Albirex Niigata (S)	Loan Return
MF	(Singapore) Faizal Raffi	(Singapore) Warriors FC	
MF	(Singapore) Aarish Kumar	(Singapore) Warriors FC	
MF	(Singapore) Zulfadhmi Suzliman	(Singapore) Tampines Rovers	Undisclosed
MF	(Singapore) Elijah Lim Teck Yong	(Singapore) Tampines Rovers	Free
MF	(Singapore) Karthik Raj	(Singapore) Hougang United	
FW	(Japan) Shuhei Hoshino	(South Korea) Busan Transportation FC	Free
FW	(Singapore) Syukri Noorhaizam	(Singapore) Tiong Bahru FC (NFL)	Free

Note 1: Noor Akid Nordin returns to the team after the loan and subsequently retires from football.

==== Out ====
Position	Player	Transferred To	Ref
GK	(Singapore) Naqiuddin Nodin		
GK	(Singapore) Faris Danial		
DF	(Singapore) Sufianto Salleh		
DF	(Singapore) Sheikh Abdul Hadi		
DF	(Singapore) Ahmad Zaki		
DF	(Singapore) Fazli Shafie		
DF	(Singapore) Nurullah Hussein	(Singapore) Geylang International	Free
DF	(Singapore) Illyas Lee	(Singapore) Warriors FC	Free
MF	(Singapore) Huzaifah Aziz	(Singapore) Tampines Rovers	Free
MF	(Singapore) Daniel Goh	(Singapore) Albirex Niigata (S)	Free
MF	(Singapore) Raihan Rahman	(Singapore) Tanjong Pagar United	Free
MF	(Singapore) Afiq Salman Tan	Retired	
MF	(Singapore) Noor Akid Nordin	(Singapore) Albirex Niigata (S)	
MF	(Singapore) Max Goh Yi Qi		
MF	(Austria) Sanjin Vrebac	(Lithuania) FK Panevėžys	
MF	(Singapore) Jonathan Tan	(Singapore) Tiong Bahru FC (NFL)	

==== Extension / Retained ====
Position	Player	Ref
GK	(Singapore) Zaiful Nizam	1 year contract signed in 2019
GK	(Singapore) Zacharial Leong	1 year contract signed in 2019
DF	(Singapore) Fadli Kamis	1 year contract signed in 2019
DF	(Singapore) Ahmad Syahir Sahimi	1 year contract signed in 2019
DF	(Singapore) Khalili Khalif	1 year contract signed in 2019
MF	(Croatia) Kristijan Krajcek	1 year contract signed in 2019
FW	(Singapore) Hazzuwan Halim	2 years contract signed in 2019
FW	(Croatia) Šime Žužul	2 year contract signed in 2019

==== Promoted ====
Position	Player	Ref

=== Mid-season transfer ===
==== In ====
Position	Player	Transferred From	Ref
GK	(Singapore) Hafiz Ahmad	(Singapore) SAFSA	Free
DF	(Singapore) R Aaravin	(Singapore) Warriors FC	
MF	(Singapore) (Nigeria) Jordan Efe Okwudili Emaviwe		

== Friendly ==
=== Pre-Season Friendly ===
Win Draw Loss

18 January 2019 1	Balestier Khalsa (Singapore)	8–0	(Singapore) Projects Vault Oxley FC	Toa Payoh Stadium

30 January 2020 2	Albirex Niigata (S) (Singapore)	cancelled	(Singapore) Balestier Khalsa	Jurong East Stadium

1 February 2019 3	Balestier Khalsa (Singapore)	11–0	Singapore Khalsa Association	Toa Payoh Stadium
	(o.g.); Šime Žužul 37' 39'; Hazzuwan Halim 46' 63'; Syukri Noorhaizam 48'; Azizi Rahman 72'; Shuhei Hoshino 68' 76' 82'; Ensar Brunčević 90'

6 February 2020 4	Balestier Khalsa (Singapore)	1–1	(Malaysia) Perak FA	Toa Payoh Stadium
	Shuhei Hoshino 14'		Shahrel Fikri 89'

13 February 2020 5	Albirex Niigata (S) (Singapore)	1–0	(Singapore) Balestier Khalsa	Jurong East Stadium
	Ryoya Tanigushi 70'

19 February 2020 6	Young Lions (Singapore)	cancelled	(Singapore) Balestier Khalsa	Jalan Besar Stadium

20 February 2020 7	Johor Darul Ta'zim (Malaysia)	7–0	(Singapore) Balestier Khalsa	Johor, Malaysia
	Diogo Luís Santo 20' 63' 65'; Aidil Zafuan 53'; Maurício 61'; Leandro Velázquez 72'; Hazwan Bakri 78'			Stadium: Sultan Ibrahim Stadium

== Team statistics ==
=== Appearances and goals ===
As of 15 September 2018

Numbers in parentheses denote appearances as substitute.

No.	Pos.	Player	Sleague		Singapore Cup		Total	
No.	Pos.	Player	Apps.	Goals	Apps.	Goals	Apps.	Goals
2	DF	(Singapore) Fadli Kamis	11(1)	0	0	0	12	0
3	DF	(Singapore) Jufri Taha	2(5)	0	0	0	7	0
4	DF	(Singapore) Khalili Khalif	3	0	0	0	3	0
5	DF	(Serbia) Ensar Brunčević	5	3	0	0	5	3
6	MF	(Singapore) Aarish Kumar	11(1)	0	0	0	12	0
7	FW	(Singapore) Hazzuwan Halim	14	3	0	0	14	3
8	MF	(Croatia) Kristijan Krajcek	13	3	0	0	13	3
9	FW	(Japan) Shuhei Hoshino	14	4	0	0	14	4
10	FW	(Croatia) Šime Žužul	11(3)	6	0	0	14	6
11	MF	(Singapore) Karthik Raj	5(3)	0	0	0	8	0
12	MF	(Singapore) (Nigeria) Jordan Emaviwe	4(2)	0	0	0	6	0
15	DF	(Singapore) R Aaravin	7(1)	1	0	0	8	1
17	MF	(Singapore) Zulfadhmi Suzliman	4(10)	0	0	0	14	0
18	DF	(Singapore) Ahmad Syahir	13	0	0	0	13	0
19	GK	(Singapore) Zaiful Nizam	14	0	0	0	14	0
21	DF	(Singapore) Yeo Hai Ngee	1(7)	0	0	0	8	0
22	MF	(Singapore) Elijah Lim Teck Yong	4(1)	0	0	0	5	0
26	MF	(Singapore) Faizal Raffi	2(6)	0	0	0	8	0
28	FW	(Singapore) Syukri Noorhaizam	1(1)	0	0	0	2	0
32	DF	(Singapore) Danish Uwais	4	1	0	0	4	1
39	DF	(Singapore) Aiman Zavyan	1(1)	0	0	0	2	0
52	DF	(Singapore) Keshav Kumar	4(4)	0	0	0	8	0
55	MF	(Singapore) Azizi Rahman	0(2)	0	0	0	2	0
77	MF	(Singapore) (Mali) Sameer Alassane	6(4)	0	0	0	10	0

== Competitions ==
=== Overview ===
Competition	Record							
Competition	P	W	D	L	GF	GA	GD	Win %

=== Singapore Premier League ===
Win Draw Loss

1 March 2020 1	Tampines Rovers (Singapore)	1–0	(Singapore) Balestier Khalsa	Our Tampines Hub
	Boris Kopitović 7'; Shannon Stephen (yellow card) 19'; Jordan Webb (yellow card) 46'; Shah Shahiran (yellow card) 57'; Zehrudin Mehmedović (yellow card) 86'	Report	Shuhei Hoshino (penalty missed) 58; Hazzuwan Halim (yellow card) 21'; Šime Žužul (yellow card) 45+1'; C. Aarish Kumar (yellow card) 60'; Faizal Raffi (yellow card) 78'; Zulfadhmi Suzliman (yellow card) 84'	Referee: Farhan Mohd; Man of the Match: (Singapore) Syazwan Buhari

7 March 2020 2	Balestier Khalsa (Singapore)	2–2	(Singapore) Albirex Niigata (S)	Bishan Stadium
	Ensar Brunčević 26'; Shuhei Hoshino 58'; Zaiful Nizam (yellow card) 89'; Ahmad Syahir (yellow card) 90+2'	Report	Ryoya Tanigushi 52'; Reo Nishiguchi 89'; Ryosuke Nagasawa (yellow card) 87'	Referee: Ahmad A'Qashah; Man of the Match: (Singapore) Zaiful Nizam

14 March 2020 3	Young Lions FC (Singapore)	0–2	(Singapore) Balestier Khalsa	Jurong West Stadium
	Harhys Stewart (yellow card) 33'; Danish Irfan (yellow card) 74'	Report	Hazzuwan Halim 32'; Ensar Brunčević 76' (yellow card) 29'; Ahmad Syahir (yellow card) 41'; C. Aarish Kumar (yellow card) 45+1'; Zulfadhmi Suzliman (yellow card) 62' (yellow-red card) 71'	Attendance: 0 (Note: Due to Covid 19, this match is played behind closed door.); Referee: Mohd Syarqawi; Man of the Match: (Singapore) Hazzuwan Halim

18 March 2020 4	Balestier Khalsa (Singapore)	2–2	(Singapore) Hougang United	Bishan Stadium
	Šime Žužul 38'; Shuhei Hoshino 64'; Hazzuwan Halim (yellow card) 43'; Zaiful Nizam (yellow card) 57'	Report	Stipe Plazibat 48' 57'; Fabian Kwok (yellow card) 42'; Sahil Suhaimi (yellow card) 90'	Attendance: 0 Referee: Lim Liang Yi; Man of the Match: (Croatia) Stipe Plazibat

17 October 2020 5 (Rescheduled) (Note: The match is postponed following the coronavirus pandemic.)	Tanjong Pagar United (Singapore)	0–1	(Singapore) Balestier Khalsa	Jurong East Stadium
	Faritz Abdul Hameed (yellow card) 86'	Report	Ensar Brunčević 50'; Elijah Lim Teck Yong (yellow card) 45+3'; Ahmad Syahir (yellow card) 81'; Zaiful Nizam (yellow card) 85'	Attendance: 0 Referee: Muhammad Zulfiqar; Man of the Match: (Serbia) Ensar Brunčević

24 October 2020 6 (Rescheduled)	Geylang International (Singapore)	2–3	(Singapore) Balestier Khalsa	Our Tampines Hub
	khairul Nizam 33' (yellow card) 50'; Barry Maguire 90+4'; Hairul Syirhan 80' (o.g.) (yellow card) 45'	Report	Kristijan Krajcek 60'; Hazzuwan Halim 66'; Ahmad Syahir (yellow card) 38'; Keshav Kumar (yellow card) 58'	Attendance: 0 Referee: Lim Liang Yi; Man of the Match: (Croatia) Kristijan Krajcek

7 November 2020 7 (Rescheduled)	Balestier Khalsa (Singapore)	1–7	(Singapore) Lion City Sailors	Bishan Stadium
	Kristijan Krajcek 63'; Faizal Raffi (yellow card) 78'	Report	Stipe Plazibat 10' 27' 31'; Song Ui-young 18'; Saifullah Akbar 33'; Tajeli Salamat 56'; Adam Swandi 65'	Attendance: 0 Referee: Juherman Zaiton; Man of the Match: (Croatia) Stipe Plazibat

12 November 2020 8 (Rescheduled)	Balestier Khalsa (Singapore)	2–2	(Singapore) Tampines Rovers	Bishan Stadium
	Šime Žužul 45' 55' (yellow card) 55'; Ahmad Syahir (yellow card) 18'; Keshav Kumar (yellow card) 19'; Kristijan Krajcek (yellow card) 41'; Fadli Kamis (yellow card) 53'; R Aaravin (yellow card) 64'; Faizal Raffi (yellow card) 90+3'	Report	Ryaan Sanizal 5'; Boris Kopitović 18' (pen.); Syahrul Sazali (yellow card) 90+3'	Attendance: 0 Referee: Muhammad Taqi; Man of the Match: (Montenegro) Boris Kopitović

17 November 2020 9 (Rescheduled)	Albirex Niigata (S) (Singapore)	2–0	(Singapore) Balestier Khalsa	Jurong East Stadium
	Hiroyoshi Kamata 65'; Tomoyuki Doi 80' (yellow card) 90'; Reo Nishiguchi (yellow card) 84'	Report	Sameer Alassane (yellow card) 77'; Kristijan Krajcek (yellow card) 82'; Ahmad Syahir (yellow card) 87'; Yeo Hai Ngee (yellow card) 88'	Attendance: 0 Referee: Nathan Chan; Man of the Match: (Japan) Ryosuke Nagasawa

21 November 2020 10 (Rescheduled)	Balestier Khalsa (Singapore)	1–2	(Singapore) Young Lions FC	Bishan Stadium
	R Aaravin 57'; Kristijan Krajcek (yellow card) 39'; Fadli Kamis (yellow card) 45' (red card) 61'	Report	Jacob Mahler 45+1' (pen.); Ryhan Stewart 86'; Harhys Stewart (yellow card) 36'; Nur Adam Abdullah (yellow card) 37'; Ryhan Stewart (yellow card) 38'; Amirul Haikal (yellow card) 75'	Attendance: 0 Referee: Y. Sathyakumar; Man of the Match: (Singapore) Ryhan Stewart

25 November 2020 11 (Rescheduled)	Balestier Khalsa (Singapore)	2–2	(Singapore) Tanjong Pagar United	Bishan Stadium
	Danish Uwais 22'; Shuhei Hoshino 32'; C. Aarish Kumar (yellow card) 50'	Report	Luiz Júnior 26'; Shodai Nishikawa 35'	Attendance: 0 Referee: Ahmad A'Qashah; Man of the Match: (Brazil) Luiz Júnior

28 November 2020 12 (Rescheduled)	Balestier Khalsa (Singapore)	2–0	(Singapore) Geylang International	Bishan Stadium
	Kristijan Krajcek 48'; Hazzuwan Halim 58'; R Aaravin (yellow card) 37'; Shuhei Hoshino (yellow card) 90'	Report	Yuki Ichikawa (yellow card) 34'; Christopher van Huizen (yellow card) 82'	Attendance: 0 Referee: Muhammad Zulfiqar; Man of the Match: (Singapore) R Aaravin

2 December 2020 13 (Rescheduled)	Hougang United (Singapore)	1–2	(Singapore) Balestier Khalsa	Hougang Stadium
	Justin Hui 10'; Maksat Dzhakybaliev (yellow card) 30'; Shawal Anuar (yellow card) 90+4'	Report	Shuhei Hoshino 5' (yellow card) 50'; Šime Žužul 76'; Hazzuwan Halim (yellow card) 14'	Attendance: 0 Referee: Syarqawi Buhari; Man of the Match: (Croatia) Šime Žužul

5 December 2020 14 (Rescheduled)	Lion City Sailors (Singapore)	5–2	(Singapore) Balestier Khalsa	Bishan Stadium
	Shahril Ishak 20'; Saifullah Akbar 34'; Danish Uwais 39' (o.g.); Song Ui-young 80' 90+2'; Rudy Khairullah (yellow card) 66'	Report	Sime Zuzul 41' 88'; Ahmad Syahir (yellow card) 47'	Attendance: 0 Referee: Jansen Foo; Man of the Match: (Singapore) Hafiz Nor

Table

Pos	Team	Pld	W	D	L	GF	GA	GD	Pts	Qualification or relegation
3	Lion City Sailors	14	8	3	3	44	18	+26	27	Qualification for AFC Cup group stage
4	Geylang International	14	6	2	6	18	22	−4	20	Qualification for AFC Cup group stage
5	Balestier Khalsa	14	5	4	5	22	28	−6	19	
6	Hougang United	14	4	3	7	19	24	−5	15	
7	Young Lions (Note: The foreign club – Albirex Niigata (S) – as well as the Football Association of Singapore (FAS) under-21 team, Young Lions, are ineligible for any AFC competition spots.)	14	3	0	11	12	38	−26	9	

Source: Singapore Premier League
Rules for classification: 1) points; 2) goal difference; 3) number of goals scored; 4) number of wins
