= 2020 Tampines Rovers FC season =

Tampines Rovers FC
2020 season
- Chairman: Desmond Ong
- Coach: Gavin Lee
- Ground: Our Tampines Hub
Home colours	Away colours

The 2020 season was Tampines Rovers's third season in the Singapore Premier League, their 25th season at the top level of Singapore football and 75th year in existence as a football club. Tampines Rovers also participated in this season's editions of the Singapore League Cup, Singapore Cup, Singapore Community Shield and the AFC Cup.

Managed by Gavin Lee in his second full season, the Stags finished second in the Singapore Premier League.

== Review ==
Tampines Rovers' 14th and final game of the season was at home against Geylang International at Our Tampines Hub on 5 December. The visitors took the lead on 24 minutes when Barry Maguire scored a header past Syazwan Buhari from Fareez Farhan's corner. Baihakki Khaizan levelled for the Stages in the 80th minute with a header from Irwan Shah's free-kick. The matched ended on a 1–1 which meant Lee's side finished their 2020 Singapore Premier League campaign in second place, three points behind champions Albirex Niigata (S).

== Squad ==
=== Singapore Premier League ===
As of 18 February 2020

No.	Name	Nationality	Date of birth (age)	Last club	Contract Since	Contract End
Goalkeepers
1	Zulfairuuz Rudy	(Singapore)	22 May 1994 (age 32)	(Singapore) Hougang United	2019	2020
24	Syazwan Buhari	(Singapore)	22 September 1992 (age 34)	(Singapore) Geylang International	2018	2020
Defenders
2	Shannon Stephen	(Singapore)	6 February 1994 (age 32)	(Singapore) Young Lions FC	2017	2020
3	Ryaan Sanizal ^{U23}	(Singapore)	31 May 2002 (age 24)	(Singapore) FFA U16	2019	2020
5	Amirul Adli	(Singapore)	13 January 1996 (age 30)	(Singapore) Young Lions FC	2018	2020
6	Madhu Mohana	(Singapore)	6 March 1991 (age 35)	(Malaysia) Negeri Sembilan FA	2018	2020
14	Baihakki Khaizan ^{>30}	(Singapore)	31 January 1984 (age 42)	(Thailand) PT Prachuap F.C.	2020	2021
16	Daniel Bennett ^{>30}	(Singapore) (England)	7 January 1978 (age 48)	(Singapore) Geylang International	2017	2020
17	Irwan Shah ^{>30}	(Singapore)	2 November 1988 (age 38)	(Singapore) Warriors FC	2016	2020
18	Fathullah Rahmat ^{U23}	(Singapore)	5 September 2002 (age 24)	(Singapore) FFA U17	2019	2020
21	Hamizan Hisham ^{U23}	(Singapore)	10 November 2001 (age 25)	(Singapore) FFA U18	2019	2020
22	Syahrul Sazali ^{U23}	(Singapore)	3 June 1998 (age 28)	(Singapore) Young Lions FC	2020	2020
Midfielders
4	Huzaifah Aziz	(Singapore)	27 June 1994 (age 32)	(Singapore) Balestier Khalsa	2020	2020
7	Yasir Hanapi ^{>30}	(Singapore)	21 June 1989 (age 37)	(Malaysia) PDRM FA	2018	2020
8	Kyoga Nakamura	(Japan)	25 April 1996 (age 30)	(Singapore) Albirex Niigata (S)	2020	2020
15	Shah Shahiran ^{U23}	(Singapore)	14 November 1999 (age 27)	(Singapore) FFA U18	2018	2020
23	Zehrudin Mehmedović ^{U21}	(Serbia)	15 March 1998 (age 28)	(Serbia) FK Mladost Lučani	2019	2020
Forwards
9	Boris Kopitović	(Montenegro)	27 April 1995 (age 31)	(Montenegro) OFK Petrovac	2020	2020
10	Jordan Webb ^{>30}	(Canada) (Jamaica) (Singapore)	24 March 1988 (age 38)	(Singapore) Warriors FC	2018	2020
13	Taufik Suparno	(Singapore) (Indonesia)	31 October 1995 (age 31)	(Singapore) SAFSA	2018	2020
19	Hairil Sufi ^{U23}	(Singapore)	27 May 2000 (age 26)	(Singapore) Hougang United	2020	2020
28	Fazrul Nawaz ^{>30}	(Singapore)	17 April 1985 (age 41)	(Singapore) Hougang United	2020	2020
Players loaned out / left during season
11	Safirul Sulaiman	(Singapore)	12 October 1992 (age 34)	(Singapore) Geylang International	2018	2020
12	Joel Chew ^{U23}	(Singapore)	9 February 2000 (age 26)	(Singapore) FFA U18	2019	2020

== Coaching staff ==
Position	Name	Ref.
Chairman	(Singapore) Desmond Ong	
General Manager	(Singapore) Desmund Khusnin	
Team Manager	(Singapore) William Phang	
Head coach	(Singapore) Gavin Lee	
Assistant coach	(Singapore) Fahrudin Mustafić	
Goalkeeping coach	(Singapore) William Phang	
Physiotherapist	(Singapore) Premjit Singh	
Kitman	(Singapore) Goh Koon Hiang	

== Transfers ==
=== Pre-season ===
==== In ====
Position	Player	Transferred From	Ref
DF	(Singapore) Syahrul Sazali	(Singapore) Young Lions FC	Free
MF	(Japan) Kyoga Nakamura	(Singapore) Albirex Niigata	Free
MF	(Singapore) Huzaifah Aziz	(Singapore) Balestier Khalsa	Free
FW	(Singapore) Hairil Sufi	(Singapore) Hougang United	Free
FW	(Montenegro) Boris Kopitović	(Montenegro) OFK Petrovac	Free
FW	(Singapore) Hairil Sufi	(Singapore) Hougang United	Free

==== Out ====
Position	Player	Transferred To	Ref
GK	(Singapore) Zephen-Sean	(Singapore)	Released
GK	(Singapore) Nurshafiq Zaini	(Singapore) Young Lions	
DF	(Singapore) Zakri Ee Kai Ren	(Singapore)	Released
DF	(Singapore) Akmal Azman	(Singapore) Young Lions	
MF	(Singapore) Shahdan Sulaiman	(Singapore) Lion City Sailors F.C.	Undisclosed
MF	(Singapore) Zulfadhmi Suzliman	(Singapore) Balestier Khalsa	Undsiclosed
MF	(Singapore) Elijah Lim Teck Yong	(Singapore) Balestier Khalsa	Free
FW	(Japan) Ryutaro Megumi	(Malaysia) Felda United	Free
GK	(Singapore) Haikal Hasnol		NS till 2020
DF	(Singapore) Irfan Najeeb		NS till 2020

Note 1: Shahdan Sulaiman's contract end at 2021 but transferred to Home United for undisclosed fee.

Note 2: Zulfadhmi Suzliman's contract end at 2020 but transferred to Balestier Khalsa for undisclosed fee.

==== Extension and retained ====
Position	Player	Ref
Coach	(Singapore) Gavin Lee	2 years extension
GK	(Singapore) Syazwan Buhari	
GK	(Singapore) Zulfairuuz Rudy	
DF	(Singapore) Madhu Mohana	1 year extension
DF	(Singapore) (England) Daniel Bennett	
DF	(Singapore) Amirul Adli	3 years contract signed in 2018
DF	(Singapore) Shannon Stephen	3 years contract signed in 2018
DF	(Singapore) Irwan Shah	
MF	(Singapore) Yasir Hanapi	3 years contract signed in 2018
MF	(Serbia) Zehrudin Mehmedović	1 year contract signed in 2019
MF	(Singapore) Safirul Sulaiman	
FW	(Canada) Jordan Webb	3 years contract signed in 2018
FW	(Singapore) Taufik Suparno	

==== Promoted ====
Position	Player	Ref
GK	(Singapore) Danial Iliya	
DF	(Singapore) Ryaan Sanizal	
DF	(Singapore) Fathullah Rahmat	
DF	(Singapore) Hamizan Hisham	
MF	(Singapore) Haziq Mikhail	
MF	(Singapore) Danish Siregar	

=== Mid-season transfers ===
==== In ====
Position	Player	Transferred From	Ref
DF	(Singapore) Baihakki Khaizan	(Thailand) PT Prachuap F.C.	Free; 2 years contract signed in 2020
FW	(Singapore) Fazrul Nawaz	(Singapore) Warriors FC	Free

==== Out ====
Position	Player	Transferred To	Ref
MF	(Singapore) Safirul Sulaiman	(Singapore) Geylang International	Undisclosed
MF	(Singapore) Joel Chew Joon Herng	(Singapore) SAFSA	NS
DF	(Singapore) Syahrul Sazali	(Singapore) SAFSA	NS

== Friendlies ==
=== Pre-season ===
Win Draw Loss

5 February 2020 1	Johor Darul Ta'zim F.C. II (Malaysia)	2–2	(Singapore) Tampines Rovers	Johor, Malaysia
	Fernando Rodríguez 27'; Amirul Husaini Zamri 48'		Zehrudin Mehmedović 24'; Boris Kopitović 75'	Stadium: Larkin Stadium

Leo Cup 2020 Thailand – 26 to 30 January

25 January 2020 Leo Cup QF	Muangthong United (Thailand)	2–1	(Singapore) Tampines Rovers	Nonthaburi Province
	Derley 57' 89'		Boris Kopitović 18'	Stadium: SCG Stadium

== Team statistics ==
=== Appearances and goals ===
No.	Pos.	Player	Sleague		Singapore Cup		ACL / AFC Cup		Charity Shield		Total	
No.	Pos.	Player	Apps.	Goals	Apps.	Goals	Apps.	Goals	Apps.	Goals	Apps.	Goals
1	GK	(Singapore) Zulfairuuz Rudy	0	0	0	0	1	0	0	0	1	0
2	DF	(Singapore) Shannon Stephen	2(2)	0	0	0	1(3)	0	0(1)	0	9	0
3	DF	(Singapore) Ryaan Sanizal	10	1	0	0	0	0	0	0	10	1
4	MF	(Singapore) Huzaifah Aziz	1(6)	0	0	0	1(1)	0	0	0	9	0
5	DF	(Singapore) Amirul Adli	9(3)	1	0	0	4	0	1	0	17	1
6	DF	(Singapore) Madhu Mohana	6(6)	1	0	0	3	0	0(1)	0	16	1
7	MF	(Singapore) Yasir Hanapi	8(1)	0	0	0	3	0	1	0	13	0
8	MF	(Japan) Kyoga Nakamura	14	0	0	0	4	0	1	0	19	0
9	FW	(Montenegro) Boris Kopitović	14	9	0	0	4	3	1	1	19	13
10	FW	(Canada) Jordan Webb	10(1)	7	0	0	4	3	1	1	16	11
13	FW	(Singapore) Taufik Suparno	1(11)	3	0	0	0(3)	0	0(1)	0	16	3
14	DF	(Singapore) Baihakki Khaizan	5(3)	1	0	0	0	0	0	0	8	1
15	MF	(Singapore) Shah Shahiran	14	1	0	0	4	0	1	0	19	1
16	DF	(Singapore) (England) Daniel Bennett	11(2)	0	0	0	2	0	0	0	15	0
17	DF	(Singapore) Irwan Shah	7(7)	1	0	0	4	0	1	1	19	2
18	MF	(Singapore) Fathullah Rahmat	0	0	0	0	0	0	0	0	0	0
19	FW	(Singapore) Hairil Sufi	0	0	0	0	0	0	0	0	0	0
21	DF	(Singapore) Hamizan Hisham	2	0	0	0	0	0	0	0	2	0
22	DF	(Singapore) Syahrul Sazali	8	1	0	0	2(2)	0	1	0	13	1
23	MF	(Serbia) Zehrudin Mehmedović	9(3)	2	0	0	4	0	1	0	17	2
24	GK	(Singapore) Syazwan Buhari	14	0	0	0	3	0	1	0	18	0
28	FW	(Singapore) Fazrul Nawaz	0(3)	0	0	0	0	0	0	0	3	0
53	DF	(Singapore) Andrew Aw	4	0	0	0	0	0	0	0	4	0
56	FW	(Singapore) Danish Siregar	2(2)	0	0	0	0	0	0	0	4	0
Players who have played this season and/or sign for the season but had left the club or on loan to other club
11	MF	(Singapore) Safirul Sulaiman	0(1)	0	0	0	0(1)	0	0	0	2	0
12	MF	(Singapore) Joel Chew Joon Herng	2	0	0	0	0(1)	0	1	0	5	0

Note ^{4} Player scored 4 goals ^{5} Player scored 5 goals

== Competitions ==
=== Overview ===
Competition	Record							
Competition	P	W	D	L	GF	GA	GD	Win %
SPL	14	8	5	1	27	11	+16	57.14
AFC Cup	3	2	1	0	4	2	+2	66.67
Charity Shield	1	1	0	0	3	0	+3	100.00
Total	18	11	6	1	34	13	+21	61.11

=== Charity Shield ===
Hougang United was a last minute replacement for DPMM FC after DPMM pulled out from the Charity Shield due to COVID-19.

Win Draw Loss

22 February 2020 Charity Shield (Note: Hougang United was a last minute replacement for DPMM FC after DPMM pulled out from the Charity Shield due to Covid 19.)	Tampines Rovers (Singapore)	3–0	(Singapore) Hougang United	Jalan Besar Stadium
18:00	Irwan Shah 57'; Boris Kopitović 63'; Jordan Webb 69' (yellow card) 81' (yellow-red card) 82'; Kyoga Nakamura (yellow card) 34'; Syazwan Buhari (yellow card) 90'		Shawal Anuar (yellow card) 41'; Jordan Nicolas Vestering (yellow card) 48'; Anders Aplin (yellow card) 81'; Afiq Noor (yellow card) 85'	Referee: Ahmad A'Qashah; Man of the Match: (Singapore) Irwan Shah

=== Singapore Premier League ===
Tampines Rovers ended the Singapore Premier league as the runners-up.

Win Draw Loss

1 March 2020 1	Tampines Rovers (Singapore)	1–0	(Singapore) Balestier Khalsa	Our Tampines Hub
	Boris Kopitović 7'; Shannon Stephen (yellow card) 19'; Jordan Webb (yellow card) 46'; Shah Shahiran (yellow card) 57'; Zehrudin Mehmedović (yellow card) 86'	Report	Shuhei Hoshino (penalty missed) 58; Hazzuwan Halim (yellow card) 21'; Šime Žužul (yellow card) 45+1'; C. Aarish Kumar (yellow card) 60'; Faizal Raffi (yellow card) 78'; Zulfadhmi Suzliman (yellow card) 84'	Referee: Farhan Mohd; Man of the Match: (Singapore) Syazwan Buhari

14 March 2020 2 (Rescheduled)	Tampines Rovers (Singapore)	2–0	(Singapore) Tanjong Pagar United	Our Tampines Hub
	Jordan Webb 12' 74'; Huzaifah Aziz (yellow card) 42'	Report	Syabil Hisham (yellow card) 29'; Nashrul Amin (yellow card) 57'; Delwinder Singh (yellow card) 61'; Ignatius Ang (yellow card) 79'; Luiz Júnior (yellow card) 84'; Yann Motta (yellow card) 85'	Attendance: 0 (Note: Due to Covid 19, this match is played behind closed door.); Referee: Muhammad Zulfiqar; Man of the Match: (Canada) Jordan Webb

18 March 2020 3	Tampines Rovers (Singapore)	4–0	(Singapore) Lion City Sailors F.C.	Our Tampines Hub
	Boris Kopitović 60'; Zehrudin Mehmedović 69'; Jordan Webb 78'; Shah Shahiran 82'; Daniel Bennett (yellow card) 16'	Report	Kaishu Yamazaki (yellow card) 10'; Hafiz Nor (yellow card) 77'	Attendance: 0 Referee: G. Letchman; Man of the Match: (Canada) Jordan Webb

17 October 2020 4 (Rescheduled) (Note: The match is postponed following the coronavirus pandemic.)	Tampines Rovers (Singapore)	1–2	(Singapore) Hougang United	Our Tampines Hub
	Irwan Shah 60'; Taufik Suparno (yellow card) 75'; Syahrul Sazali (yellow card) 19'; Amirul Adli (yellow card) 49'	Report	Sahil Suhaimi 15' (yellow card) 33'; Farhan Zulkifli 18'; Maksat Dzhakybaliev (yellow card) 90+5'	Attendance: 0 Referee: Jansen Foo; Man of the Match: (Singapore) Sahil Suhaimi

31 October 2020 5 (Rescheduled)	Tampines Rovers (Singapore)	2–0	(Singapore) Albirex Niigata (S)	Our Tampines Hub
	Syahrul Sazali 20' (yellow card) 87'; Jordan Webb 56' (pen.); Huzaifah Aziz (yellow card) 90+3'	Report	Fairoz Hasan (yellow card) 24'; Gareth Low (yellow card) 33'; Ryosuke Nagasawa (yellow card) 52'; Ryoya Tanigushi (yellow card) 66'	Attendance: 0 Referee: Farhan Mohd; Man of the Match: (Canada) Jordan Webb

4 November 2020 6 (Rescheduled)	Tampines Rovers (Singapore)	1–0	(Singapore) Young Lions FC	Our Tampines Hub
	Madhu Mohana 25'	Report	Jacob Mahler (yellow card) 38'; Ryhan Stewart (yellow card) 69'; Irfan Najeeb (yellow card) 72'	Attendance: 0 Referee: Lim Liang Yi; Man of the Match: (Japan) Kyoga Nakamura

7 November 2020 7 (Rescheduled)	Geylang International (Singapore)	1–1	(Singapore) Tampines Rovers	Our Tampines Hub
	Khairul Nizam 22'; Firdaus Kasman (yellow card) 39'; Adam Hakeem (yellow card) 41' (yellow-red card) 54'; Barry Maguire (yellow card) 80'; Hairul Syirhan (yellow card) 90+4'	Report	Boris Kopitović 12'; Jordan Webb (yellow card) 71'; Irwan Shah (yellow card) 85'; Yasir Hanapi (yellow card) 90'	Attendance: 0 Referee: Farhan Mohd; Man of the Match: (Singapore) Khairul Nizam

12 November 2020 8 (Rescheduled)	Balestier Khalsa (Singapore)	2–2	(Singapore) Tampines Rovers	Bishan Stadium
	Šime Žužul 45' 55' (yellow card) 55'; Ahmad Syahir (yellow card) 18'; Keshav Kumar (yellow card) 19'; Kristijan Krajcek (yellow card) 41'; Fadli Kamis (yellow card) 53'; R Aaravin (yellow card) 64'; Faizal Raffi (yellow card) 90+3'	Report	Ryaan Sanizal 5'; Boris Kopitović 18' (pen.); Syahrul Sazali (yellow card) 90+3'	Attendance: 0 Referee: Muhammad Taqi; Man of the Match: (Montenegro) Boris Kopitović

17 November 2020 9 (Rescheduled)	Young Lions FC (Singapore)	1–3	(Singapore) Tampines Rovers	Jurong West Stadium
	Khairin Nadim 20'; Shahib Masnawi (yellow card) 24'; Nurshafiq Zaini (yellow card) 83'	Report	Jordan Webb 50' 70' 84' (pen.); Shah Shahiran (yellow card) 35'; Kyoga Nakamura (yellow card) 39'; Ryaan Sanizal (yellow card) 46'; Irwan Shah (yellow card) 60'; Madhu Mohana (yellow card) 79'	Attendance: 0 Referee: Ahmad A'Qashah; Man of the Match: (Canada) Jordan Webb

22 November 2020 10 (Rescheduled)	Tanjong Pagar United (Singapore)	2–2	(Singapore) Tampines Rovers	Jurong East Stadium
	Luiz Júnior 61' 81'; Raihan Rahman (yellow card) 8'; Faritz Abdul Hameed (yellow card) 18'; Delwinder Singh (yellow card) 90+2'	Report	Boris Kopitović 5' 75'; Jordan Webb (red card) 37'; Kyoga Nakamura (yellow card) 62'; Taufik Suparno (yellow card) 78'	Attendance: 0 Referee: Taufik Thana; Man of the Match: (Brazil) Luiz Júnior

25 November 2020 11 (Rescheduled)	Hougang United (Singapore)	0–2	(Singapore) Tampines Rovers	Hougang Stadium
	Anders Aplin (yellow card) 17'; Farhan Zulkifli (yellow card) 32'; Nazrul Nazari (yellow card) 56'; Hafiz Sujad (yellow card) 73'	Report	Boris Kopitović 22' (yellow card) 76'; Taufik Suparno 46'; Fazrul Nawaz (yellow card) 90+2'	Attendance: 0 Referee: Nathan Chan; Man of the Match: (Singapore) Yasir Hanapi

29 November 2020 12 (Rescheduled)	Albirex Niigata (S) (Singapore)	1–4	(Singapore) Tampines Rovers	Jurong East Stadium
	Tomoyuki Doi 37'; Kenta Kurishima (yellow card) 82'	Report	Boris Kopitović 49' 62'; Amirul Adli 57'; Taufik Suparno 88'; Andrew Aw (yellow card) 24'; Zehrudin Mehmedović (yellow card) 64'	Attendance: 0 Referee: Jansen Foo; Man of the Match: (Japan) Kyoga Nakamura

2 December 2020 13 (Rescheduled)	Lion City Sailors (Singapore)	1–1	(Singapore) Tampines Rovers	Bishan Stadium
	Shahril Ishak 45'; Arshad Shamim (yellow card) 19'; Song Ui-young (yellow card) 72'	Report	Zehrudin Mehmedović 63'; Amirul Adli (yellow card) 90'	Attendance: 0 Referee: Nathan Chan; Man of the Match: (Serbia) Zehrudin Mehmedović

5 December 2020 14 (Rescheduled)	Tampines Rovers (Singapore)	1–1	(Singapore) Geylang International	Our Tampines Hub
	Andrew Aw (yellow card) 44'; Baihakki Khaizan 79' (yellow card) 66'	Report	Barry Maguire 24'; Firdaus Kasman (yellow card) 34' (red card) 90+7'; Amy Recha (yellow card) 61'; Umar Akhbar (yellow card) 78'; Darren Teh (yellow card) 87'; Hairul Syirhan (yellow card) 90+1'	Attendance: 0 Referee: Ahmad A'Qashah; Man of the Match: (Singapore) Baihakki Khaizan

Pos	Team	Pld	W	D	L	GF	GA	GD	Pts	Qualification or relegation
1	Albirex Niigata (S) (Note: The foreign club – Albirex Niigata (S) – as well as the Football Association of Singapore (FAS) under-21 team, Young Lions, are ineligible for any AFC competition spots.) (C)	14	10	2	2	32	14	+18	32	
2	Tampines Rovers	14	8	5	1	27	11	+16	29	Qualification for AFC Champions League group stage
3	Lion City Sailors	14	8	3	3	44	18	+26	27	Qualification for AFC Cup group stage
4	Geylang International	14	6	2	6	18	22	−4	20	Qualification for AFC Cup group stage
5	Balestier Khalsa	14	5	4	5	22	28	−6	19	
6	Hougang United	14	4	3	7	19	24	−5	15	
7	Young Lions	14	3	0	11	12	38	−26	9	
8	Tanjong Pagar United	14	0	5	9	14	33	−19	5	

Source: Singapore Premier League
Rules for classification: 1) points; 2) goal difference; 3) number of goals scored; 4) number of wins
(C) Champions

=== Singapore Cup ===
Win Draw Loss

=== AFC Champions League ===
Win Draw Loss

==== Qualifying play-off ====
14 January 2018 Preliminary round 1	Tampines Rovers (Singapore)	3–5 (a.e.t.)	(Indonesia) Bali United	Kallang
	Boris Kopitović 43'; Jordan Webb 52'; Rahmat Syamsuddin 67' (o.g.); Shah Shahiran (yellow card) 42'; Syahrul Sazali (yellow card) 113'	Report	Melvin Platje 8' 12'; Rahmat Syamsuddin 82'; Stefano Lilipaly 100'; Sidik Saimima 114'; Brwa Nouri (yellow card) 38'; Willian Pacheco (yellow card) 105'	Stadium: Jalan Besar Stadium; Attendance: 1,400; Referee: Ahmad Yacoub Ibrahim (Jordan)

=== AFC Cup ===
Pos	Team	Pld	W	D	L	GF	GA	GD	Pts	TAM	KAY	PSM	SHA
1	(Singapore) Tampines Rovers	3	2	1	0	4	2	+2	7	—	~~29 Sep~~	2–1	2–1
2	(Philippines) Kaya–Iloilo	3	1	2	0	3	1	+2	5	0–0	—	~~23 Sep~~	~~26 Sep~~
3	(Indonesia) PSM Makassar	3	1	1	1	5	4	+1	4	~~26 Sep~~	1–1	—	3–1
4	(Myanmar) Shan United	3	0	0	3	2	7	−5	0	~~23 Sep~~	0–2	~~29 Sep~~	—

Source: AFC
Rules for classification: Tiebreakers

Win Draw Loss

==== Group stage ====
12 February 2020 Matchday 1	Tampines Rovers (Singapore)	2–1	(Indonesia) PSM Makassar	Jalan Besar, Singapore
	Jordan Webb 23'; Boris Kopitović 64'; Madhu Mohana (yellow card) 52'	Report	Ferdinand Sinaga 68'; Asnawi Mangkualam (yellow card) 14'; Ahmad Agung (yellow card) 41'; Šerif Hasić (yellow card) 47' (yellow-red card) 88'	Stadium: Jalan Besar Stadium; Attendance: 1,266; Referee: Mooud Bonyadifar (Iran)

26 February 2020 Matchday 2	Kaya–Iloilo (Philippines)	0–0	(Singapore) Tampines Rovers	Bacolod, Philippines
	Masanari Omura (yellow card) 37'; Simone Rota (yellow card) 90'	Report		Stadium: Panaad Stadium; Referee: Hussein Abo Yehia (Lebanon)

10 March 2020 Matchday 3	Tampines Rovers (Singapore)	2–1	(Myanmar) Shan United F.C.	Jurong West, Singapore
	Boris Kopitović 55'; Jordan Webb 71'; Shah Shahiran (yellow card) 52'	Report	Hein Phyo Win 90+1'; Ye Yint Tun (yellow card) 32'; Hein Thiha Zaw (yellow card) 52'; Nyein Chan (yellow card) 58'; Zin Min Tun (yellow card) 90+2'	Stadium: Jurong West Stadium; Referee: Chen Hsin-chuan (Chinese Taipei)

23 September 2020 Matchday 4 (Rescheduled)	Shan United F.C. (Myanmar)	cancelled	(Singapore) Tampines Rovers	Yangon, Myanmar
		Report		Stadium: Thuwunna Stadium

26 September 2020 Matchday 5 (Rescheduled)	PSM Makassar (Indonesia)	cancelled	(Singapore) Tampines Rovers	Cibinong, Indonesia
		Report		Stadium: Pakansari Stadium

29 September 2020 Matchday 6 (Rescheduled)	Tampines Rovers (Singapore)	cancelled	(Philippines) Kaya–Iloilo	Jurong West, Singapore
		Report		Stadium: Jurong West Stadium
