= Mirko Šugić =

Croatian footballer

Personal information
- Date of birth: 25 April 1994 (age 32)
- Place of birth: Nova Gradiška, Croatia
- Height: 1.90 m (6 ft 3 in)
- Position: Midfielder

Senior career*
| Years | Team | Apps | (Gls) |
| 2014-2016 | Vrapče | | |
| 2016-2017 | HAŠK | | |
| 2018 | Dubrava | | |
| 2019 | Kustošija | 5 | (0) |
| 2019–2022 | Dubrava | 37 | (0) |
| 2020 | → Ilzer SV (loan) | 0 | (0) |
| 2022–2023 | Tanjong Pagar United | 48 | (6) |
- * Club domestic league appearances and goals as of 29 October 2022

Mirko Šugić (born 25 April 1994) is a Croatian professional footballer who plays as a midfielder, most recently for Singapore Premier League club Tanjong Pagar United. Mainly playing as a central midfielder, Šugić is also capable of playing as an attacking midfielder or defensive midfielder.

== Club career ==
He played a couple of friendly matches for Austrian side Ilzer SV, just before the 2020 COVID-19 pandemic kicked in.

=== Tanjong Pagar United ===
Šugić made the move to the Singapore Premier League side after he was recommended by Dragan Talajić, who played as a goalkeeper for Tanjong Pagar from 1997 to 2001 and won the Singapore Cup in 1998. Prior to joining the Jaguars, he was plying his trade in the Croatian second tier with NK Dubrava. Šugić grabbed his first assist for his new club in less than a minute into his competitive debut, finding teammate Reo Nishiguchi just inside the box who chested the ball and unleashed a volley into the back of the net in just 47 seconds of the game. Šugić grabbed his first two goals to help his team to a 5–3 win over Balestier Khalsa, with his first an acrobatic effort that bulged the net before sweeping home after a melee at a corner kick for his second. His performances in the opening rounds of the season saw him win the Player of the Month award for March 2022.

== Career statistics ==
=== Club ===
As of 8 November 2023.

| Club | Season | League | | | Cup | | Other | | Total | |
| Club | Season | Division | Apps | Goals | Apps | Goals | Apps | Goals | Apps | Goals |
|---|---|---|---|---|---|---|---|---|---|---|
| NK Kustošija | 2018–19 | Druga HNL | 5 | 0 | 0 | 0 | 0 | 0 | 5 | 0 |
| NK Kustošija | Total | | 5 | 0 | 0 | 0 | 0 | 0 | 5 | 0 |
| NK Dubrava | 2019–20 | Druga HNL | 2 | 0 | 0 | 0 | 0 | 0 | 2 | 0 |
| NK Dubrava | 2020–21 | Druga HNL | 32 | 0 | 0 | 0 | 0 | 0 | 32 | 0 |
| NK Dubrava | 2021–22 | Druga HNL | 3 | 0 | 0 | 0 | 0 | 0 | 3 | 0 |
| NK Dubrava | Total | | 37 | 0 | 0 | 0 | 0 | 0 | 37 | 0 |
| Tanjong Pagar United | 2022 | Singapore Premier League | 25 | 5 | 3 | 0 | 0 | 0 | 28 | 5 |
| Tanjong Pagar United | 2023 | Singapore Premier League | 23 | 1 | 3 | 0 | 0 | 0 | 26 | 1 |
| Tanjong Pagar United | Total | | 48 | 6 | 6 | 0 | 0 | 0 | 54 | 6 |
| Career total | | | 68 | 6 | 5 | 0 | 0 | 0 | 95 | 6 |

== Honours ==
=== Individual ===
• Singapore Premier League Player of the Month: March 2022
