= Naufal Ilham =

Singaporean footballer (born 2002)

Personal information
- Full name: Mohamad Naufal Ilham bin Mohamad Ismail
- Date of birth: 17 August 2002 (age 24)
- Place of birth: Singapore
- Height: 1.69 m (5 ft 7 in)
- Position: Midfielder

Team information
- Current team: Tanjong Pagar United
- Number: 7

Youth career
- –2020: Lion City Sailors F.C.

Senior career*
Years	Team	Apps	(Gls)
2021–	Tanjong Pagar United	23	(0)

International career
2017	Singapore U16	1	(0)
2019	Singapore U19	1	(0)
- * Club domestic league appearances and goals as of 15:04, 24 May 2021 (UTC)

Mohamad Naufal Ilham bin Mohamad Ismail (born 16 August 2002) is a Singaporean footballer currently playing as a midfielder for Tanjong Pagar United.

== Club ==
=== Tanjong Pagar United ===
He made his debut against Geylang International.

== Career statistics ==
=== Club ===
As of 24 May 2021.

Club	Season	League			Cup		Other		Total	
Club	Season	Division	Apps	Goals	Apps	Goals	Apps	Goals	Apps	Goals
Tanjong Pagar United	2021	Singapore Premier League	10	0	0	0	0	0	10	0
Tanjong Pagar United	2022	Singapore Premier League	5	0	0	0	0	0	5	0
Tanjong Pagar United	2023	Singapore Premier League	8	0	0	0	0	0	8	0
Tanjong Pagar United	2024-25	Singapore Premier League	0	0	0	0	0	0	0	0
Tanjong Pagar United	Total		23	0	0	0	0	0	23	0
Career total			23	0	0	0	0	0	23	0
