= Zulfadhmi Suzliman =

Singaporean footballer

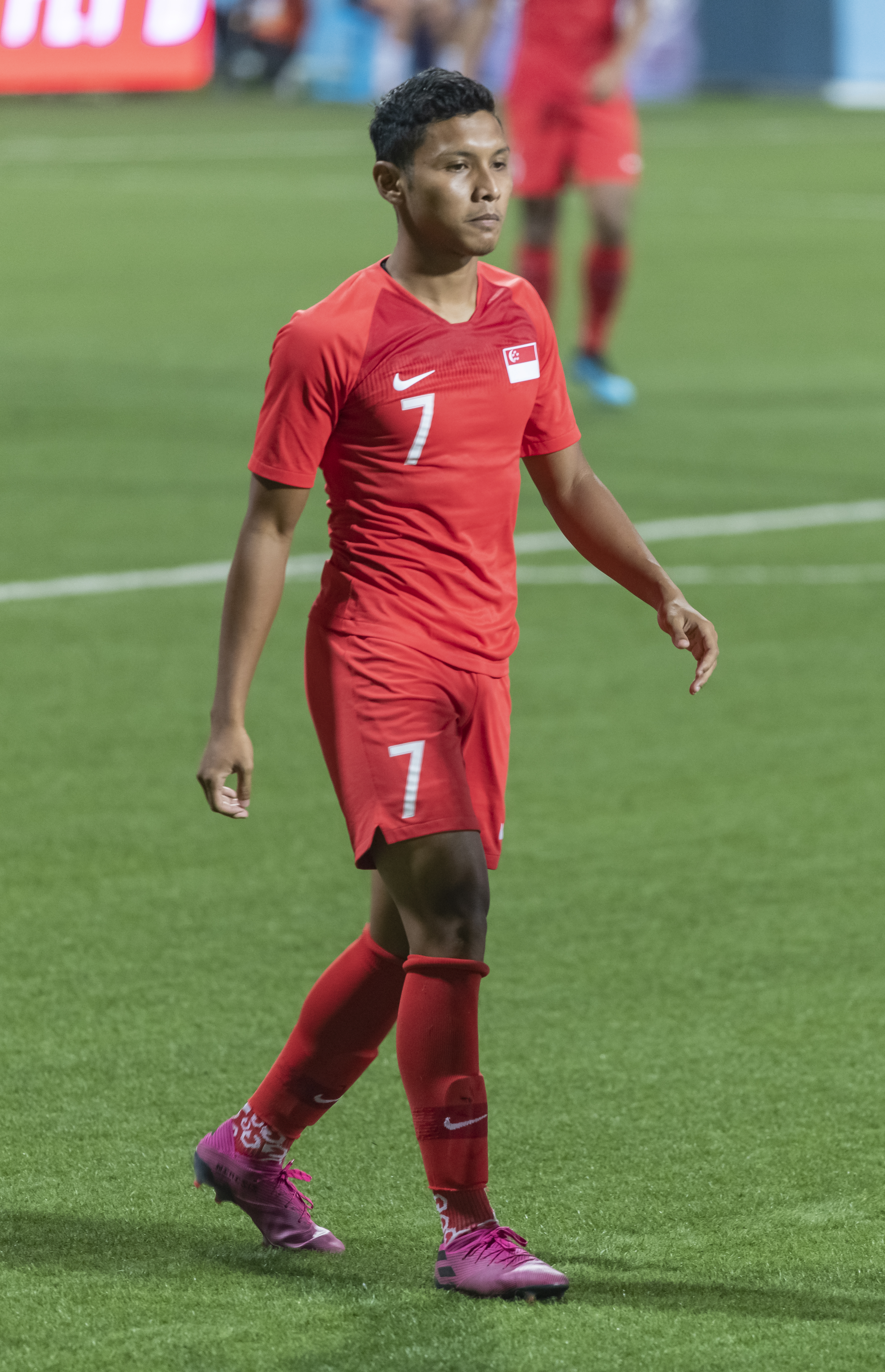

Personal information
- Full name: Muhammad Zulfadhmi bin Suzliman
- Date of birth: 10 February 1996 (age 30)
- Place of birth: Singapore
- Height: 1.71 m (5 ft 7 in)
- Position: Midfielder

Youth career
- –2014: National Football Academy
- 2015: Tampines Rovers

Senior career*
Years	Team	Apps	(Gls)
2016	Young Lions	7	(0)
2017–2019	Tampines Rovers	45	(1)
2020	Balestier Khalsa	14	(0)
2022	Geylang International	2	(0)
2022	Starlight Soccerites	0	(0)
2023–2024	Tanjong Pagar United	17	(0)

International career^{‡}
2012	Singapore U16		
2016–2018	Singapore U22		
2018	Singapore	2	(0)
- * Club domestic league appearances and goals ‡ National team caps and goals as of 11 September 2018

Muhammad Zulfadhmi bin Suzliman (born 10 February 1996) is a Singaporean footballer who plays as a winger, most recently for Singapore Premier League club Tanjong Pagar United.

He is the older brother of Zulqarnaen Suzliman, a professional footballer who plays for Singapore Premier League club Lion City Sailors as a right back.

== Club career ==
=== Youth career ===
Zulfadhmi started his football career at NFA before joining Tampines Rovers youth team in 2015.

=== Young Lions ===
Zulfadhmi was named in the squad for the 2016 S.League season where he make his professional debut on 20 February 2016 in a 5–0 lost to Albirex Niigata (S). He went on to make 7 appearance in the season for the club.

=== Tampines Rovers ===
Zulfadhmi signed with Tampines Rovers ahead of the 2017 season but was featured often for the club youth team. He was then promoted to the senior squad in the inaugural revamp 2018 Singapore Premier League season. He make his debut for the club on 14 January 2018 during the 2018 AFC Champions League qualifying play-offs against Indonesian club Bali United in a 3–1 lost.

Zulfadhmi scored his first professional goal against Albirex Niigata (S) on 20 May 2018 where he end up winning the 'Goal of the Year' award in that season.

=== Balestier Khalsa ===
On 9 January 2020, Zulfadhmi joined Balestier Khalsa. He make his debut for the club on 1 March against his former club Tampines Rovers.

=== Geylang International ===
On 31 March 2022, Zulfadhmi joined Geylang International. He make his debut on 5 April against Albirex Niigata (S). However he was released after playing twice for the club.

=== Starlight Soccerites ===
On 1 May 2022, Zulfadhmi joined semi-professional club that plays in the Singapore Football League, Starlight Soccerites.

=== Tanjong Pagar United ===
Zulfadhmi joined Tanjong Pagar United on 24 January 2023. He make his debut on 10 March in a 2–0 win against Geylang International.

== International career ==
=== Youth ===
Zulfadhmi represented Singapore's youth sides, Singapore U16 and U22.

=== Senior ===
On 29 August 2018, Zulfadhmi was called up to the Singapore national team by newly appointed head coach, Fandi Ahmad for the friendlies against Mauritius and Fiji. Zulfadhmi made his international debut on 7 September against Mauritius. He started the match and played the full 90 minutes in a 1–1 draw. He made his second appearance for the Lions four days later in a 2–0 friendly win against Fiji.

== Personal life ==
Zulfadhmi has two elder brothers, Zulkifli and Zulfadhli and a younger brother Zulqarnaen, all of whom have played in the Singapore Premier League.

Zulfadhmi served his 2 years National Service in SCDF.

== Honours ==
=== Club ===
Tampines Rovers

- Singapore Cup: 2019
- Singapore Community Shield: 2020

=== Individual ===
Singapore Premier League Goal of the Year: 2018

== Career statistics ==
As of match played 5 Dec 2020. Caps and goals may not be correct

Club	Season	S.League		Singapore Cup		Singapore League Cup		Asia		Total	
Club	Season	Apps	Goals	Apps	Goals	Apps	Goals	Apps	Goals	Apps	Goals
Young Lions FC	2016	7	0	-	-	1	0	—		8	0
Young Lions FC	Total	7	0	0	0	1	0	0	0	8	0
Tampines Rovers	2017	6	0	0	0	0	0	0	0	6	0
Tampines Rovers	2018	22	1	2	0	0	0	7	0	31	1
Tampines Rovers	2019	7	0	0	0	0	0	1	0	8	0
Tampines Rovers	Total	35	1	2	0	0	0	8	0	45	1
Balestier Khalsa	2020	14	0	0	0	0	0	0	0	14	0
Balestier Khalsa	Total	14	0	0	0	1	0	0	0	14	0
Geylang International	2022	2	0	0	0	0	0	0	0	2	0
Geylang International	Total	2	0	0	0	0	0	0	0	2	0
Tanjong Pagar United	2023	0	0	0	0	0	0	0	0	0	0
Tanjong Pagar United	Total	0	0	0	0	0	0	0	0	0	0
Career total		56	1	2	0	1	0	8	0	67	1

=== International ===
As of September 2018

Singapore national team
Year	Apps	Goals
2018	2	0
Total	2	0
