= Fathullah bin Rahmat =

Singaporean footballer

Fathullah Rahmat
Personal information
- Full name: Fathullah bin Rahmat
- Date of birth: 5 September 2002 (age 24)
- Place of birth: Singapore
- Height: 1.71 m (5 ft 7 in)
- Positions: Central midfielder; centre back

Team information
- Current team: Tanjong Pagar United
- Number: 13

Youth career
- –2020: Tampines Rovers U21
- 2021: Tanjong Pagar United U21

Senior career*
Years	Team	Apps	(Gls)
2021–2023	Tanjong Pagar United	49	(1)
2024–2025	Young Lions FC	22	(1)
2025–	Tanjong Pagar United	4	(0)

International career
2019–2022	Singapore U19	5	(0)
2023–	Singapore U23	5	(0)
- * Club domestic league appearances and goals as of 15:04, 28 August 2021 (UTC)

Fathullah Rahmat (born 5 September 2002) is a Singaporean footballer currently playing as a central-midfielder or centre-back for Singapore Premier League club Tanjong Pagar United FC and the Singapore national team.

== Club career ==
=== South Korea stints ===
In December 2022, it was announced that Fathullah and Ong Yu En will train with K League 1 sides Incheon United and Suwon Samsung Bluewings and K League 2 side Cheonan City from 26 December 2022 to 5 January 2023.

== International career ==
In June 2023, Fathullah was called up to the senior national squad for their upcoming friendlies against Papua New Guinea and the Solomon Islands.

== Career statistics ==
=== Club ===
As of 27 Feb 22.

Club	Season	League			Cup		Other		Total	
Club	Season	Division	Apps	Goals	Apps	Goals	Apps	Goals	Apps	Goals
Tanjong Pagar United	2021	Singapore Premier League	11	1	0	0	0	0	11	1
Tanjong Pagar United	2022	Singapore Premier League	23	0	3	0	0	0	26	0
Tanjong Pagar United	2023	Singapore Premier League	12	0	0	0	0	0	12	0
Tanjong Pagar United	Total		46	1	3	0	0	0	49	1
Young Lions	2024-25	Singapore Premier League	18	1	4	0	0	0	22	1
Young Lions	Total		18	1	4	0	0	0	22	1
Tanjong Pagar United	2024-25	Singapore Premier League	4	0	0	0	0	0	4	0
Tanjong Pagar United	Total		4	0	0	0	0	0	4	0
Career total			68	2	7	0	0	0	75	2
