= Shodai Nishikawa =

Japanese footballer

Personal information
- Date of birth: 21 September 1993 (age 33)
- Place of birth: Nara, Japan
- Height: 1.66 m (5 ft 5 in)
- Position: Winger

Team information
- Current team: Tanjong Pagar United
- Number: 25

Youth career
- 2009–2011: Diablossa Takada

College career
Years	Team	Apps	(Gls)
2012–2015	University of Tsukuba		

Senior career*
Years	Team	Apps	(Gls)
2016–2017	Kom	11	(3)
2017	Rudar Pljevlja	4	(0)
2017–2018	Petrovac	16	(0)
2020–2022	Tanjong Pagar United	61	(10)
2023–2024	Angkor Tiger	26	(3)
2024–	Tanjong Pagar United	22	(3)
- * Club domestic league appearances and goals as of 10:49, 30 October 2020 (UTC)

Shodai Nishikawa (西川 翔大, Nishikawa Shodai; born 21 September 1993), also known as just Nishikawa, is a Japanese professional footballer who currently plays as a winger for Singapore Premier League club Tanjong Pagar United.

He also holds the club record for the all-time appearance for Tanjong Pagar United, with 84.

== Club career ==
=== Kom ===
After graduating from University of Tsukuba in 2015, Nishikawa went for trials around Europe and signed for Montenegrin Second League club Kom in January 2016. He made his professional debut on 14 August 2016, where he also scored his first professional goal in a 2–1 loss against Radnički Berane.

=== Rudar Pljevlja ===
After impressing for Kom, Nishikawa subsequently on Montenegrin First League side Rudar Pljevlja on 19 January 2017. He made his debut for the club on 26 February in a league match against Dečić.

=== Petrovac ===
Nishikawa then joined another Montenegrin First League club, Petrovac, in August 2017. He made his debut on 5 August in a league match against Grbalj. He was released from the club a year later.

After leaving Europe, he went on trial with Indonesiam club Madura United in 2019. However, he failed to win a contract.

=== Tanjong Pagar United ===
After not playing football professionally for two years, Nishikawa moved to Southeast Asia to join Singapore Premier League club Tanjong Pagar United on 18 February 2020, earning around $3,000 per month. He made his first appearance for the club on 6 March in a league match against Lion City Sailors. He scored his first goal for the club in a 2–2 draw against Albirex Niigata (S) on 20 March.

During the league match against Young Lions during the 2022 season on 1 October 2022, Nishikawa recorded a hat-trick of assists in a 8–1 thrashing win. After spending three seasons at the club, he had recorded 10 goals and 18 assists in 64 appearances across all competition. He left the club at the end of the season.

=== Angkor Tiger ===
On 15 February 2023, Nishikawa joined Cambodian Premier League club Angkor Tiger where he was joined by compatriots Takuto Yasuoka, Shuto Asano and Taiga Kitajima. He made his debut for the club on 6 August in a 1–0 loss against ISI Dangkor Senchey. Nishikawa then scored his first goal for the club against the same opponent, but on home ground, in a 2–1 win on 5 November. He captained the club on 25 February 2024 in a 2–1 win against Tiffy Army.

=== Return to Tanjong Pagar United ===
On 22 May 2024, Nishikawa returned to his former club Tanjong Pagar United in preparation for the 2024–25 season. He scored a brace on 24 July in a 5–2 loss to Balestier Khalsa. On 26 January during a league match against DPMM, he surpassed Asraf Rashid with the club's all-time record appearances.

== Personal life ==
In 2021, Nishikawa get to know Fareha, a Singaporean Malay, through a social media platform. Nishikawa converted to Islam and they married in 2022. Nishikawa had attended religious classes online to learn about Islam and struggled when he started on his first fasting during Ramadan.

== Career statistics ==
=== Club ===
As of 25 May 2025

Club	Season	League			Cup		Other		Total	
Club	Season	Division	Apps	Goals	Apps	Goals	Apps	Goals	Apps	Goals
Kom	2016–17	Montenegrin Second League	11	3	3 (Note: Appearances in the Montenegrin Cup)	0	0	0	14	3
Rudar Pljevlja	2016–17	Montenegrin First League	4	0	0	0	1 (Note: Appearances in the 2016–17 Relegation play-offs)	0	5	0
OFK Petrovac	2017–18	Montenegrin First League	16	0	1	0	1 (Note: Appearances in the 2017–18 Relegation play-offs)	0	18	0
Tanjong Pagar United	2020	Singapore Premier League	13	2	0	0	0	0	13	2
Tanjong Pagar United	2021	Singapore Premier League	21	3	0	0	0	0	21	3
Tanjong Pagar United	2022	Singapore Premier League	27	5	3	0	0	0	30	5
Tanjong Pagar United	Total		61	10	3	0	0	0	64	10
Angkor Tiger	2023–24	Cambodian Premier League	26	3	0	0	0	0	26	3
Angkor Tiger	Total		26	3	0	0	0	0	26	3
Tanjong Pagar United	2024–25	Singapore Premier League	22	3	2	0	0	0	24	3
Tanjong Pagar United	Total		22	3	2	0	0	0	24	3
Career total			140	19	9	0	2	0	151	19
