= Reo Nishiguchi =

Japanese footballer

Personal information
- Date of birth: 21 August 1997 (age 29)
- Place of birth: Osaka, Japan
- Height: 1.81 m (5 ft 11 in)
- Position: Forward

Team information
- Current team: Chuncheon FC

Youth career
- Sakai Kita FC
- Cerezo Osaka
- Rip Ace SC
- 2013–2015: Kokoku High School

College career
Years	Team	Apps	(Gls)
2016–2019	Chukyo University		

Senior career*
Years	Team	Apps	(Gls)
2020	Albirex Niigata Singapore	11	(5)
2021–2022	Tanjong Pagar United	51	(39)
2023–2024	Gyeongju KHNP	13	(1)
2024–	Chuncheon FC		
- * Club domestic league appearances and goals as of 13:55, 25 February 2022 (UTC)

Reo Nishiguchi (西口 黎央, Nishiguchi Reo; born 21 August 1997) is a Japanese professional footballer who plays as a striker or winger for K3 League side Chuncheon FC.

== Club career ==
=== Chukyo University ===
Nishiguchi was part of Chukyo University school team where he participated in the 2018 Emperor's Cup. On 26 May 2018, he helped his team overcome a 2–0 deficit in extra time by scoring the first goal where his team eventually made the comeback by winning the match 3–2 against Saurcos Fukui thus qualifying to the second round, Nishiguchi also played in the next match against J1 League Júbilo Iwata but was bowed out from the tournament after suffering a 3–2 defeat in extra time.

=== Albirex Niigata Singapore ===
After graduating from Chukyo University, Nishiguchi was eventually recruited by Albirex Niigata (S) for the 2020 Singapore Premier League and started the season perfectly by scoring in 5 straight games. He eventually finished the season with 5 goals and notched 1 assist in 11 league appearances as he helped the White Swans to the 2020 Singapore Premier League title.

=== Tanjong Pagar United ===
On 14 December 2020, Tanjong Pagar United announced the signing of the Japanese forward for the 2021 Singapore Premier League season. Reo started all 21 games for the Jaguars in the 2021 season and amassed a return of nine goals and four assists in the season. Reo bettered his form in the 2022 season, scoring 30 goals in 30 games as he finished third in the goalscorers' chart where he also scored his first career hat-trick which ended up scoring 5 goals and assisted one in the demolishing match against Young Lions in a 8–1 win on 1 October 2022.

=== Gyeongju KHNP ===
On 23 February 2023, Nishiguchi moved to South Korean to signed with K3 League club Gyeongju KHNP. On 15 April, he scored his first goal for the club in which was the only goal in the match as he won his team the three points in the league against Chuncheon FC.

== Career statistics ==
=== Club ===
As of 22 June 2024.

Club	Season	League			FA Cup		Other		Total	
Club	Season	Division	Apps	Goals	Apps	Goals	Apps	Goals	Apps	Goals
Albirex Niigata Singapore	2020	Singapore Premier League	11	5	–		0	0	11	5
Albirex Niigata Singapore	Total		11	5	0	0	0	0	11	5
Tanjong Pagar United	2021	Singapore Premier League	21	9	–		0	0	21	9
Tanjong Pagar United	2022	Singapore Premier League	27	26	3	4	0	0	30	30
Tanjong Pagar United	Total		48	35	3	4	0	0	51	39
Gyeongju KHNP	2023	K3 League	6	1	1	1	0	0	7	2
Gyeongju KHNP	2024	K3 League	7	0	0	0	0	0	7	0
Gyeongju KHNP	Total		13	1	1	1	0	0	14	2
Chuncheon FC	2025	K3 League	0	0	0	0	0	0	0	0
Chuncheon FC	Total		0	0	0	0	0	0	0	0
Career total			72	45	3	4	0	0	81	48
