= Our Tampines Hub =

Integrated community and lifestyle hub

Coordinates: 1.3531°N 103.9404°E

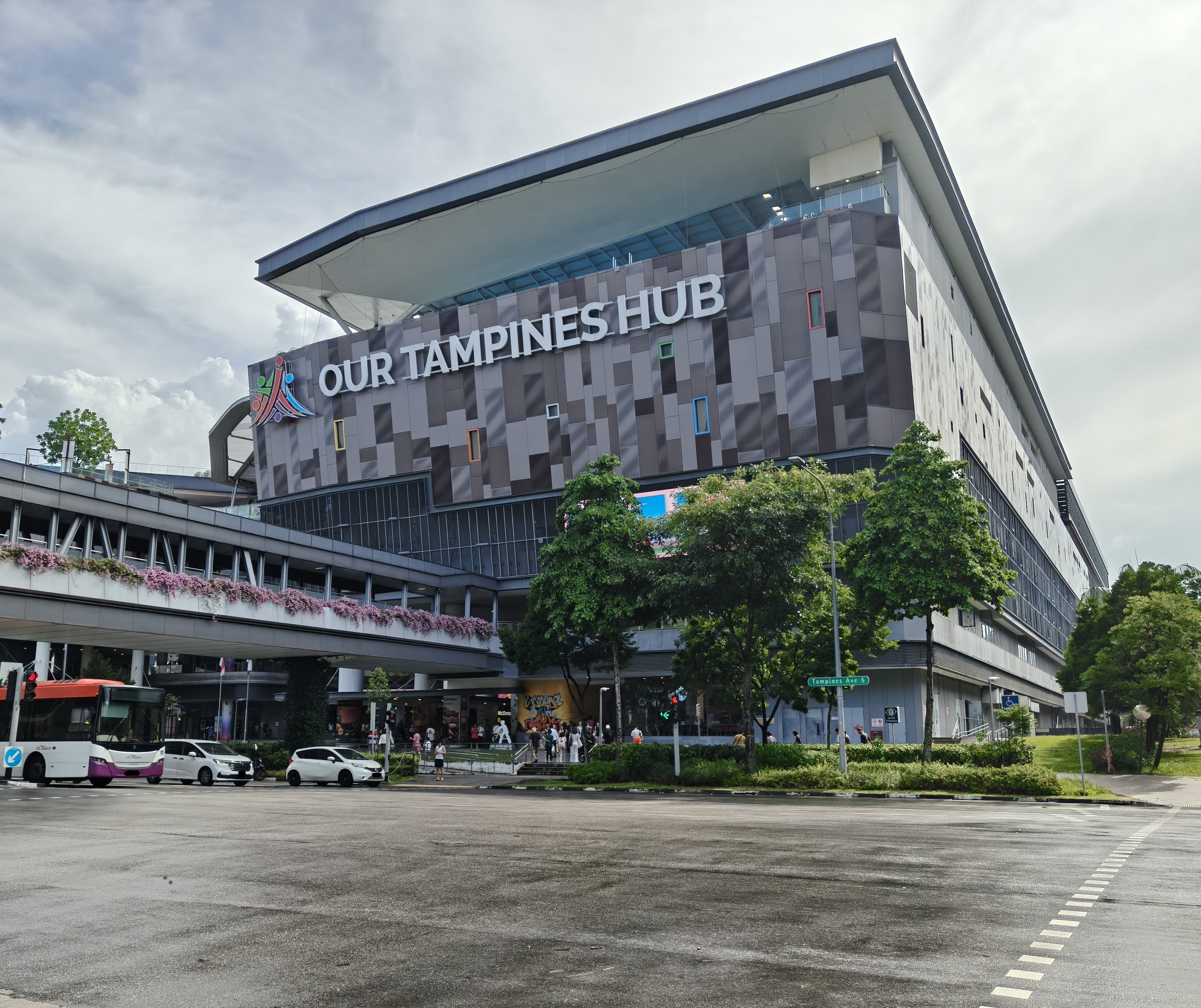
- Our Tampines Hub
- Interactive map of the Our Tampines Hub area
- Former names: Tampines Town Hub

General information
- Status: Completed
- Type: Mixed-use development
- Architectural style: Sustainable architecture
- Location: Tampines, Singapore, 1 Tampines Walk, Singapore 528523
- Opened: 6 August 2017; 9 years ago
- Cost: S$500 million
- Owner: People's Association

Technical details
- Floor count: 7
- Grounds: 5.3 hectares

Design and construction
- Architect: DP Architects Pte Ltd

Website
- tampines-hub.com
Town Square (Stadium)
- Interactive map of Town Square (Stadium)
- Capacity: 5,000
- Surface: Artificial turf
- Record attendance: 4,676 (Tampines Rovers vs DPMM, 28 July 2017)
- Public transit: EW2 DT32 Tampines
Tenants
- Tampines Rovers (2018–present); Geylang International (2019–present)

Our Tampines Hub (abbreviated as OTH) is an integrated community and lifestyle building in Tampines, Singapore. It is located on the grounds of the former Tampines Stadium and Tampines Sports Hall and is part of the development of the Tampines Regional Centre.

Built based on feedback from 15,000 residents living in the vicinity, the complex was officially opened by Prime Minister Lee Hsien Loong on 6 August 2017. The current multi-purpose complex replaced the former Tampines Stadium, Tampines Sports Hall, Tampines Swimming Complex, the Housing and Development Board (HDB) Tampines Branch Office and the Tampines Library, housing them under one roof.

== History ==
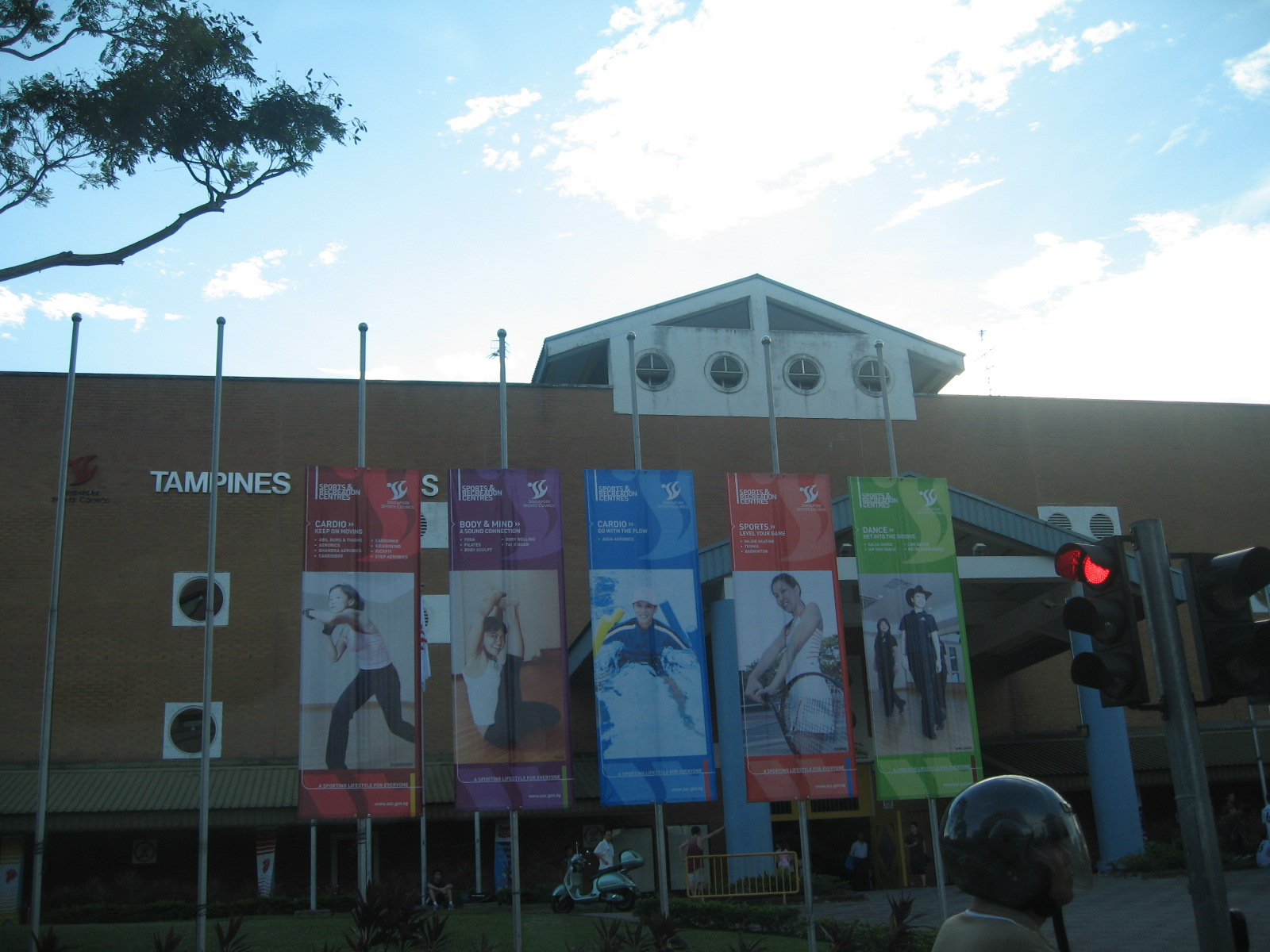
Tampines Sports Hall in July 2006

Our Tampines Hub occupies the grounds of the former sports facilities of Tampines Stadium and Tampines Sports Hall, which was opened in December 1989 in conjunction with the adjacent Tampines Swimming Complex. This coincided with the HDB's plan for opening sporting facilities new housing estates in the late eighties. Tampines Stadium was also the home stadium of the Singapore Premier League club, Tampines Rovers.

Plans for a new proposed integrated lifestyle town hub development to be built on the site of Tampines Stadium and Tampines Sports Hall were unveiled on 21 January 2011, and was part of the Tampines Masterplan for 2011–2015.

On 11 May 2013, a groundbreaking ceremony led by Members of Parliament for Tampines GRC was held at the former Tampines Stadium for what was to be for an integrated-community and sports facility on what was then known as Tampines Town Hub. By July that year, Tampines Stadium had been completely demolished. Construction commenced on 1 June 2014.

The official name of "Tampines Town Hub" was unveiled as Our Tampines Hub on 30 August 2015 with more than 2,000 residents in attendance. Residents also received updates and progress on the features and facilities offered. Residents also had a chance to vote and decide on the hub's logo. OTH opened in three phases starting from November 2016, becoming fully operational by 6 August 2017.

Video Assistant Referee

The Video Assistant Referee (VAR) technology will feature for the first time in Singapore league history, starting from the upcoming 2023 season of the Singapore Premier League

Our Tampines Hub have been retrofitted with remote cameras that relay the feeds back to the FAS headquarters in Jalan Besar which is operated centrally by a three-man team in the Production Control Room 2, which is the second such facility at the stadium. The VAR will have access to all the camera angles in the stadium and the Control Room can get these angles to check for any kind of situation from live speed to slow motion. New pitch-side camera systems that allow up to 40-time zoom have been installed, while network connectivity has been improved to deliver enhanced reliability and a smoother viewing experience. With VAR serving as extra pairs of eyes on the pitch, local football authorities hope to reduce bad refereeing calls, such as when a goal is wrongly disallowed for offside.

On 21 April 2024, Starhub organised a football event between players from the English Premier League and the Singapore national football team, including John Arne Riise, Teddy Sheringham, Dwight Yorke, David James, Emile Heskey, Jermaine Pennant, Wes Brown, Djibril Cisse, Glen Johnson, David Thompson, Dion Dublin, Keith Gillespie and Patrik Berger.

== Facilities ==
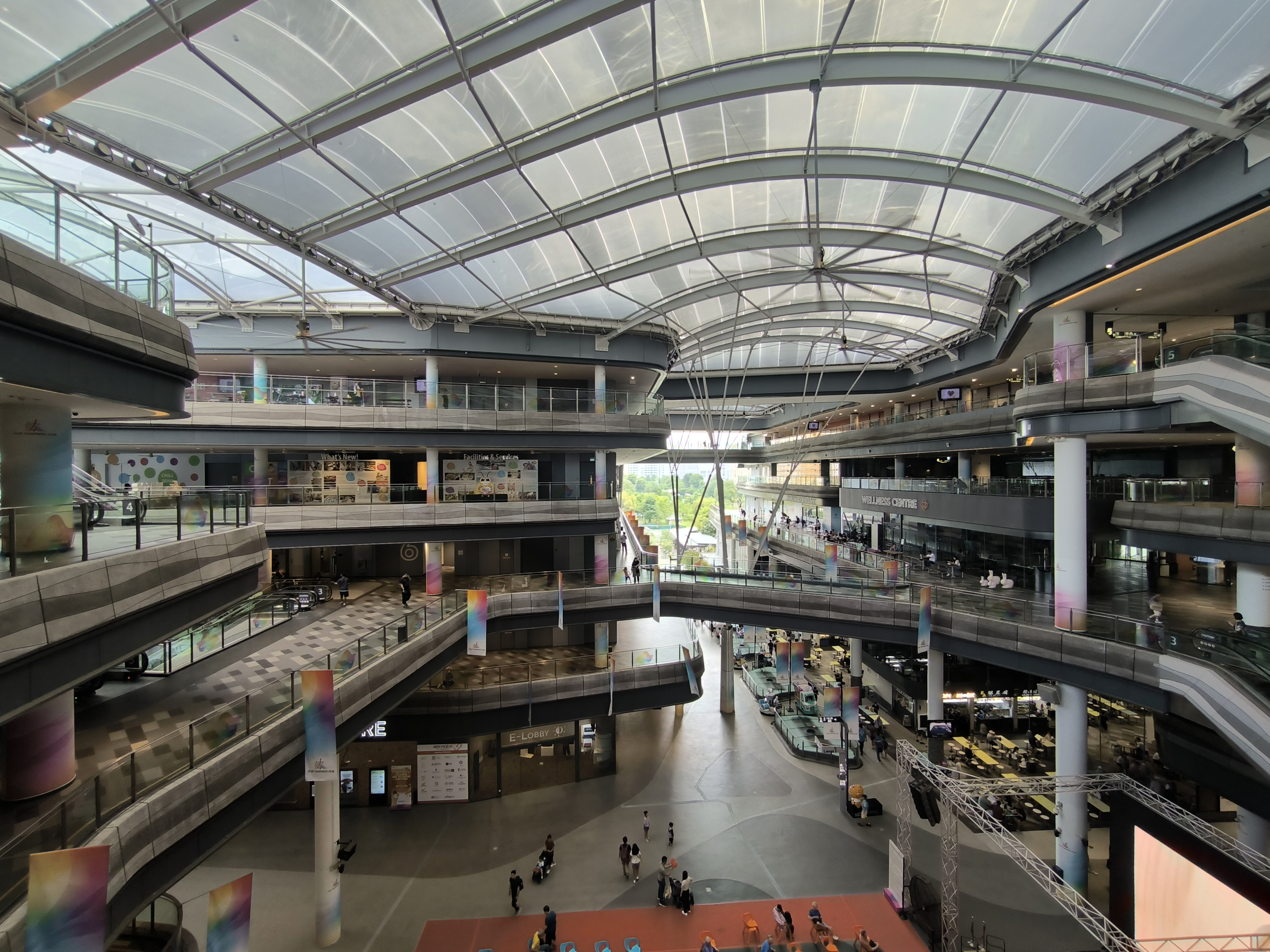
The interior of Our Tampines Hub in May 2025

The building houses six different swimming pools that satisfy families as well as sportspeople, one of which is the largest rooftop pool in Singapore. It also houses a 5,000 sq ft (460 m^{2}) playground and the Tampines Library.

=== Public Services Centre ===
OTH features a Public Services Centre, where residents have access to government services and assistance at a common location. It houses a 24/7 e-service lobby offering services from six different agencies: namely People's Association, North East Community Development Council, Housing Development Board, Workforce Singapore, Ministry of Social and Family Development, and ActiveSG.

=== Town Square ===
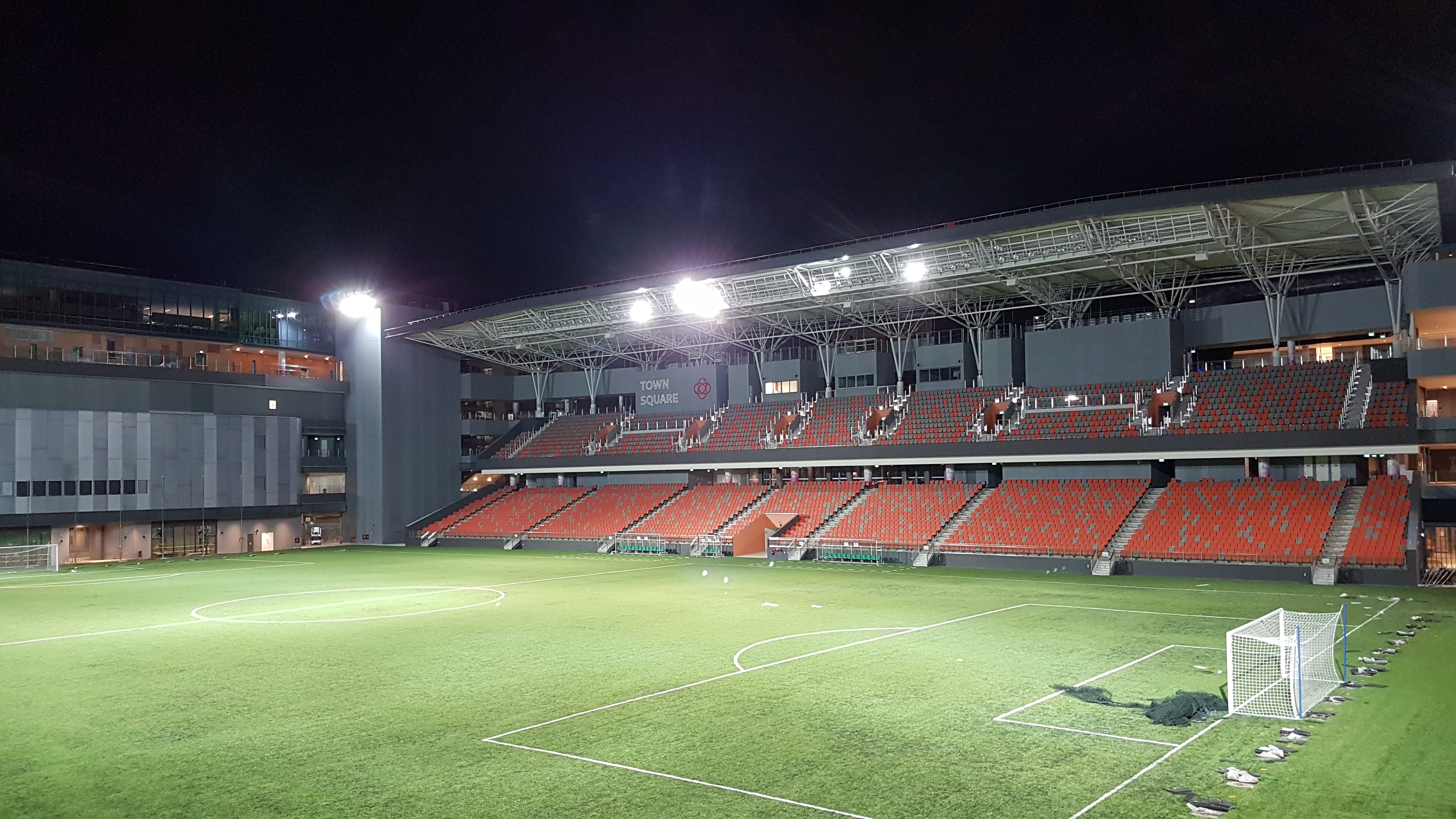
The "Town Square" in July 2017

Formerly known as Tampines Stadium, the main feature of OTH, the Town Square is a 5,100 seater stadium with a FIFA-endorsed "2 Star Quality Pro football pitch". The artificial turf can be used for both football and rugby matches, and also for other community events.

After 6 years of vacating Tampines Stadium for the construction of OTH, Tampines Rovers returned to their home ground with much fanfare. The pitch saw its first football match on 28 July 2017, with Tampines Rovers beating Bruneian club DPMM 2–0 where it was also became the highest recorded attendance at OTH for a football match to date. Tampines Rovers temporarily played at Clementi Stadium and Jurong West Stadium while OTH was under construction.

In 2019, Tampines Rovers rivals, Geylang International moved to OTH where they will both shared the stadium as the home ground for the club thus bringing the most anticipated derby in Singapore history also known as the 'Eastern Derby'.

With the redevelopment of The Float at Marina Bay, the Passing out parades of the Basic Military Training Centre are slated to be held there beginning of 2023.

=== Team Sports Hall ===
OTH houses a public sports Hall. It can be rented out for a fee and is sometimes used for the National School Games.
