= Ryaan Sanizal =

Singaporean footballer

Personal information
- Full name: Muhammad Ryaan bin Sanizal
- Date of birth: 31 May 2002 (age 24)
- Place of birth: Singapore
- Height: 1.76 m (5 ft 9 in)
- Positions: Centre-back; full-back

Team information
- Current team: Negeri Sembilan
- Number: 3

Youth career
- NFA
- Young Lions

Senior career*
Years	Team	Apps	(Gls)
2019–2025	Tampines Rovers	59	(3)
2024–2025	→ Young Lions (loan)	15	(0)
2025–2026	Hougang United	19	(0)
2026–	Negeri Sembilan	0	(0)

International career^{‡}
2017–2018	Singapore U16	4	(0)
2019	Singapore U19	5	(0)
2021–	Singapore U23	13	(0)
2022–	Singapore	3	(0)
- * Club domestic league appearances and goals as of 8 July 2026 ‡ National team caps and goals as of 14 June 2022

Muhammad Ryaan bin Sanizal (born 31 May 2002), nicknamed Yaan, is a Singaporean professional footballer who plays either as a centre-back or full-back for Malaysia Super League club Negeri Sembilan and the Singapore national team.

== Club career ==
Ryaan was nominated for the Dollah Salleh award in 2018 but failed to win it.

=== Tampines Rovers ===
Ryaan was the youngest player in the Tampines Rovers squad when he signed for them for the 2019 season.

=== Negeri Sembilan ===
On 8 July 2026, Ryaan was announced as Negeri Sembilan's first new foreign signing for the 2026–27 season, occupying one of the club's ASEAN player slots.

== International career ==
Ryaan represented Singapore at under-15 to under-23 levels.

=== Senior ===
Ryaan was first called up to the Singapore national team in 2022, for the FAS Tri-Nations Series 2022 against Malaysia and Philippines on 26 and 29 March 2022 respectively. However, he did not play in any of the matches. Ryaan made his full international debut on 14 June 2022 against Myanmar where he started the game during the 2023 AFC Asian Cup qualification in Kyrgyzstan.

In December 2024, Ryaan was called up by head coach, Tsutomu Ogura for the 2024 ASEAN Championship.

== Personal life ==
Ryaan is the older brother of Rauf Sanizal who plays as a left-back for Hougang United.

== Career statistics ==
=== Club ===
As of 16 March 2022.

Club	Season	League			Cup		Continental		Other		Total	
Club	Season	Division	Apps	Goals	Apps	Goals	Apps	Goals	Apps	Goals	Apps	Goals
(Singapore) Tampines Rovers	2019	Singapore Premier League	2	0	0	0	0	0	1	0	3	0
(Singapore) Tampines Rovers	2020	Singapore Premier League	10	1	0	0	0	0	0	0	10	1
(Singapore) Tampines Rovers	2021	Singapore Premier League	11	1	0	0	5	0	0	0	16	1
(Singapore) Tampines Rovers	2022	Singapore Premier League	25	0	0	0	2	0	0	0	27	0
(Singapore) Tampines Rovers	2023	Singapore Premier League	11	1	0	0	0	0	0	0	11	1
(Singapore) Tampines Rovers	Total		59	3	0	0	7	0	1	0	67	3
Young Lions	2024–25	Singapore Premier League	15	0	2	0	0	0	0	0	17	0
Young Lions	Total		15	0	2	0	0	0	0	0	17	0
Hougang United	2025–26	Singapore Premier League	19	0	4	0	0	0	0	0	23	0
Hougang United	Total		19	0	4	0	0	0	0	0	23	0
Negeri Sembilan	2026–27	Malaysia Super League	0	0	0	0	0	0	0	0	0	0
Negeri Sembilan	Total		0	0	0	0	0	0	0	0	0	0
Career total			93	3	6	0	7	0	1	0	107	3

=== International ===
==== International caps ====
No	Date	Venue	Opponent	Result	Competition
1	14 June 2022	Dolen Omurzakov Stadium, Bishkek, Kyrgyzstan	Myanmar	6–2 (won)	2023 AFC Asian Cup qualification
2	21 Sept 2022	Thống Nhất Stadium, Ho Chi Minh City, Vietnam	Vietnam	0-4 (lost)	2022 VFF Tri-Nations Series
3	24 Sept 2022	Thống Nhất Stadium, Ho Chi Minh City, Vietnam	India	1-1 (draw)	2022 VFF Tri-Nations Series
