= Boris Kopitović (footballer, born 1995) =

Montenegrin footballer

Personal information
- Date of birth: 27 April 1995 (age 31)
- Place of birth: FR Yugoslavia
- Height: 1.89 m (6 ft 2 in)
- Position: Striker

Team information
- Current team: Tanjong Pagar United

Senior career*
Years	Team	Apps	(Gls)
2013–2016	Petrovac	45	(15)
2016–2017	FK Mladost	24	(7)
2017–2018	Kom	25	(1)
2018–2019	Petrovac	42	(12)
2020–2025	Tampines Rovers	107	(93)
2025–2026	Bali United	47	(14)
2026–	Tanjong Pagar United	0	(0)
- * Club domestic league appearances and goals as of 22 May 2026

Boris Kopitović (born 27 April 1995) is a Montenegrin professional footballer who plays primarily as a striker for Singapore Premier League club Tanjong Pagar United.

Kopitović won the 2022 Singapore Premier League 'Top Goalscorer' award with 35 goals and was name in the 2022 'Team of the Year' in which he eventually became a key player for Tampines Rovers. He is known for his finishing inside the box and superb free-kicks.

Kopitović is also Tampines Rovers all-time top goalscorer in history with 110 goals in 138 appearances. He is the first Montenegrin to play for the club.

== Career ==
=== Petrovac ===
Kopitović started his career with Petrovac. During his time with Petrovac, he was named the revelation of the 2015–16 season in the Montenegrin First League, scoring 13 goals in 30 league appearances and also scoring back-to-back brace against Lovćen and Zeta Golubovac on 26 and 31 October 2015 respectively.

=== FK Mladost ===
In July 2016, Kopitović joined Mladost Podgorica. On 13 July 2016, he make his debut for the club in the 2016–17 UEFA Champions League second qualifying round against Bulgarian club Ludogorets in a 2–0 loss. On 22 October, he scored his first goal for the club in a 3–1 win over FK Bokelj.

=== Kom ===
On 27 July 2017, Kopitović joined Kom Podgorica on a free transfer. He scored his first and only goal for the club on 12 August 2017 against Iskra Danilovgrad.

=== Return to Petrovac ===
Kopitović returned to Petrovac after two seasons away where he was unable to replicate the form that saw him transferring to Mladost Podgorica.

Entering the winter break, Kopitović was the second top-scorer in the Montenegro top tier with 8 goals from 19 appearances for the 2019–20 Montenegrin First League, before he decided to transfer to Singapore Premier League side Tampines Rovers.

=== Tampines Rovers ===
On 6 January 2020, Kopitović moved to Southeast Asia to signed for Singapore Premier League club Tampines Rovers ahead of the 2020 season and opened his goal scoring account on his debut, netting in a 5–3 defeat to Indonesian club Bali United in the 2020 AFC Champions League qualifying play-offs on 14 January 2020. He scored in his second competitive game as well on 12 February 2020, helping his club to a 2–1 victory over Indonesian club PSM Makassar in the 2020 AFC Cup group stage. Kopitović scored a goal and also assisted Jordan Webb in the 2020 AFC Cup match against Myanmar club Shan United securing a 2–1 win. On 22 February 2020, he scored a goal to secured his club the 2020 Singapore Community Shield in a 3–0 win over Hougang United. Kopitović has enjoyed a brilliant start to life in Singapore in his first season scoring 13 goals in 19 appearances across all competitions.

In the 2021 season, Kopitović maintains his goal scoring record in which he scored in 4 consecutive matches and also scoring his first professional hat-trick against Young Lions in a 7–0 win on 7 April 2021. Kopitović also participated in the club 2021 AFC Champions League campaign where he played in all six of the club group stage matches but unfortunately failed to scored in all of the games. Kopitović than end the 2021 season scoring 16 goals in 27 appearances across all competition for the club.

However, the 2022 Season saw Kopitović flourish even further, notching 12 assists and 31 goals with 2 games left to play, going neck-to-neck with Kodai Tanaka in the challenge for the Golden Boot award. Kopitović eventually finished the season as the league top goalscorer, ending the season with 35 goals in 28 matches. He also scored a hat-trick and recorded 2 assists in a 7–1 thrashing win over Hougang United on 18 March 2022 in which he proceeded to scored in the next 6 consecutive league matches. On 30 June 2022, he scored a goal in the 2022 AFC Cup match against Malaysian club, Kuala Lumpur City in a 2–1 loss. On 3 September 2022, Kopitović scored a brace and recorded 4 assists in one match in a 7–0 away win over Young Lions. During the second leg of the 2022 Singapore Cup semi-finals match against Balestier Khalsa on 15 November 2022, he scored his second hat-trick of the season in a 8–1 thrashing win where his team qualified to the cup final.

In the 2023 season, Kopitović went on to have an impressive season maintaining his goalscoring profile where he scored 21 goals in 30 matches across all competition for the club.

On 13 January 2024, Kopitović signed a contract extension with Tampines Rovers which will see him play his fifth season with the club. He started the inaugural 2024–25 season in a fine form in which he scored a goal against Albirex Niigata (S) in a 3–1 win and also scoring in the Eastern Derby against Geylang International in a 4–4 draw. Kopitović went on to scored in six consecutive matches since the start of the season. On 13 July 2024, In his 120th appearance for the club in a league match against DPMM, he scored his 100th and 101st goal for Tampines Rovers in a 3–0 win. On 22 September in the away fixture against DPMM, Kopitović overtook Aleksandar Đurić to become Tampines Rovers all-time leading goalscorer in the club history with 110 goals. On 2 January 2025, it was announced that Kopitović has departed the club to sign with Liga 1 club Bali United after 5 years in the black and yellow jersey, leaving as the club's all-time top-scorer. The Montenegrin forward left the club, having scored 110 goals and notched 41 assists in 138 matches for the Stags from 2020 to 2024.

Bali United

On 2 January 2025, it was confirmed by reports that Kopitović will join Liga 1 side Bali United from Singapore Premier League side Tampines Rovers.

== Personal life ==
Kopitović has stated in an interview that he grown up idolising Cristiano Ronaldo back in 2003 when he was at Manchester United.

== Career statistics ==
As of 22 May 2026

Club	Season	League			FA Cup		League Cup		UEFA Cup		Total	
Club	Season	Division	Apps	Goals	Apps	Goals	Apps	Goals	Apps	Goals	Apps	Goals
Petrovac	2013–14	Montenegrin First League	1	0	0	0	0	0	0	0	1	0
Petrovac	2014–15	Montenegrin First League	14	2	3	0	0	0	0	0	17	2
Petrovac	2015–16	Montenegrin First League	30	13	2	0	0	0	0	0	32	13
Petrovac	Total		45	15	5	0	0	0	0	0	50	15
Mladost Podgorica	2016–17	Montenegrin First League	24	7	0	0	0	0	1	0	25	7
Mladost Podgorica	Total		24	7	0	0	0	0	1	0	25	7
Kom Podgorica	2017–18	Montenegrin First League	25	1	2	0	0	0	0	0	27	1
Kom Podgorica	Total		25	1	2	0	0	0	0	0	27	1
Petrovac	2018–19	Montenegrin First League	26	4	4	0	0	0	0	0	30	4
Petrovac	2019–20	Montenegrin First League	16	8	2	0	0	0	0	0	18	8
Petrovac	Total		42	12	6	0	0	0	0	0	48	12
Club	Season	League			Singapore Cup		League Cup & Others		AFC & ACL		Total	
Club	Season	Division	Apps	Goals	Apps	Goals	Apps	Goals	Apps	Goals	Apps	Goals
Tampines Rovers	2020	Singapore Premier League	15	9	0	0	1	1	4	3	20	13
Tampines Rovers	2021	Singapore Premier League	21	16	0	0	0	0	6	0	27	16
Tampines Rovers	2022	Singapore Premier League	28	35	5	5	0	0	2	1	35	41
Tampines Rovers	2023	Singapore Premier League	23	17	7	4	0	0	1	2	31	23
Tampines Rovers	2024–25	Singapore Premier League	20	16	0	0	0	0	6	1	26	17
Tampines Rovers	Total		107	93	12	9	1	1	19	7	139	110
Bali United	2024–25	Liga 1	15	6	0	0	0	0	0	0	15	6
Bali United	2025–26	Super League	32	8	0	0	0	0	0	0	32	8
Bali United	Total		47	14	0	0	0	0	0	0	47	14
Tanjong Pagar United	2026–27	Singapore Premier League	0	0	0	0	0	0	0	0	0	0
Tanjong Pagar United	Total		0	0	0	0	0	0	0	0	0	0
Career total			292	143	25	9	1	1	19	7	337	160

== Honours ==
Tampines Rovers

- Singapore Community Shield: 2020

Individual

- Singapore Premier League Top Scorer: 2022
- Singapore Premier League Team of the Year: 2022
