= Faizal Raffi =

Singaporean footballer (born 1996)

Personal information
- Date of birth: 20 January 1996 (age 30)
- Place of birth: Singapore
- Position: Midfielder

Senior career*
Years	Team	Apps	(Gls)
2015	Balestier Khalsa	0	(0)
2017–2018	Tampines Rovers	7	(0)
2019	Warriors FC	27	(3)
2020–2021	Balestier Khalsa	22	(2)
2022	Tanjong Pagar United	17	(1)
- * Club domestic league appearances and goals as of 7 April 2021 ‡ National team caps and goals as of 11 September 2018

Faizal Raffi (born 20 January 1996) is a Singaporean footballer who plays as a central midfielder for Singapore Premier League club Balestier Khalsa.

== Club career ==
=== Balestier Khalsa ===
In 2015, Raffi started his career with Balestier Khalsa Football Club and was named on the bench seven times in the season. He failed to make an appearance that season.

=== Tampines Rovers ===
He signed with the Stag's prime league squad.

== Career statistics ==
As of match played 10 Oct 2021. Caps and goals may not be correct

Club	Season	S.League		Singapore Cup		Singapore League Cup		Asia		Total	
Club	Season	Apps	Goals	Apps	Goals	Apps	Goals	Apps	Goals	Apps	Goals
Balestier Khalsa	2015	0	0	-	-	0	0	—		0	0
Tampines Rovers	2017	4	0	1	0	3	0	0	0	8	0
Tampines Rovers	2018	2	0	0	0	0	0	0	0	2	0
Tampines Rovers	Total	6	0	1	0	3	0	0	0	10	0
Warriors FC	2019	21	3	6	0	0	0	0	0	27	3
Balestier Khalsa	2020	8	0	0	0	0	0	0	0	8	0
Balestier Khalsa	2021	14	2	0	0	0	0	0	0	14	2
Balestier Khalsa	Total	22	2	0	0	0	0	0	0	22	2
Tanjong Pagar United	2022	17	1	3	0	0	0	0	0	20	1
Career total		66	6	10	0	3	0	0	0	79	6
