= Raihan Rahman =

Bengali footballer

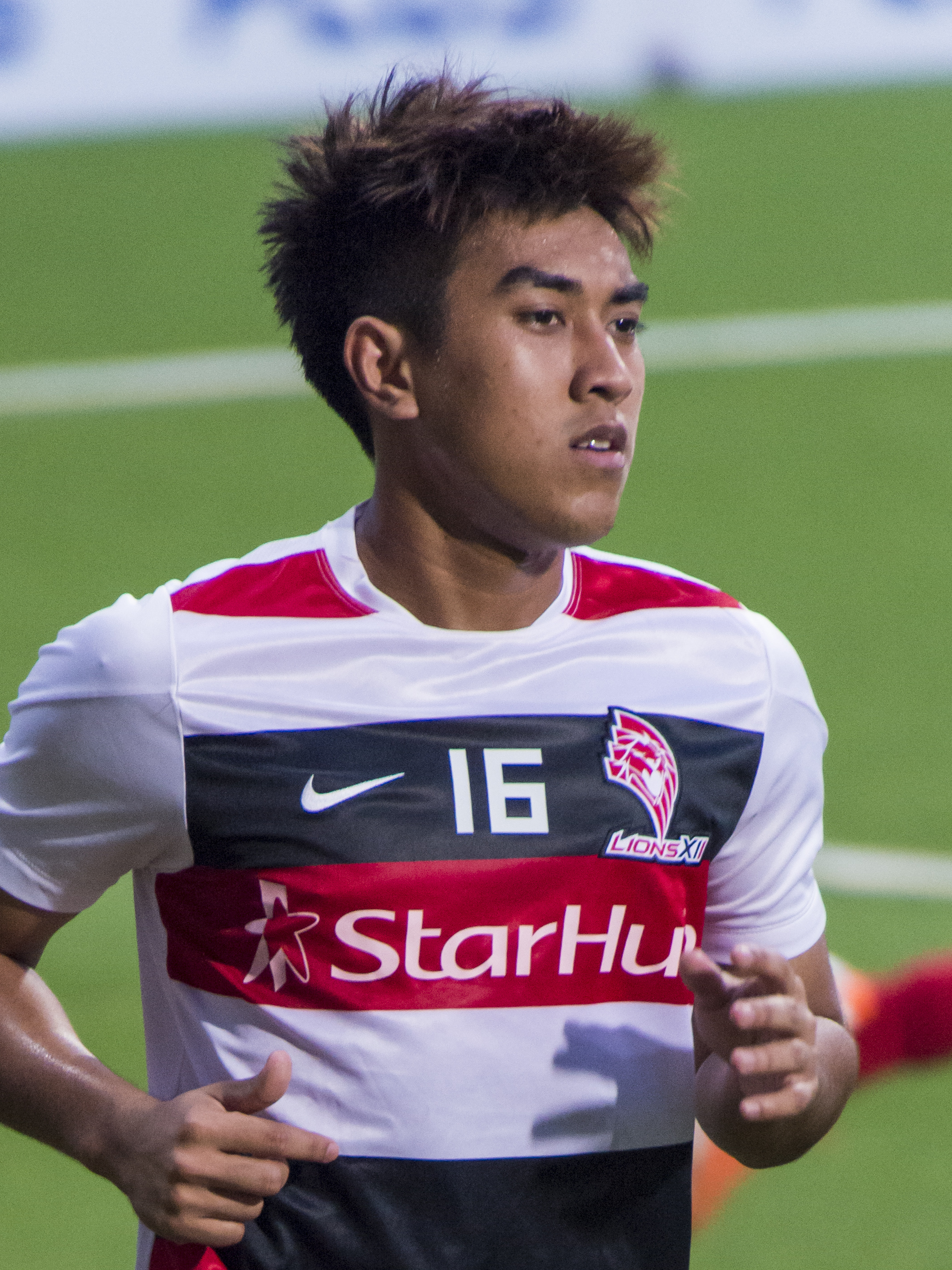
- Raihan with LionsXII in 2014

Personal information
- Full name: Muhammad Raihan bin Abdul Rahman
- Date of birth: 7 February 1991 (age 35)
- Place of birth: Singapore
- Height: 1.73 m (5 ft 8 in)
- Positions: Midfielder; defender

Team information
- Current team: Tanjong Pagar United
- Number: 16

Youth career
- Sengkang Punggol
- National Football Academy

Senior career*
Years	Team	Apps	(Gls)
2009–2011	Young Lions	16	(0)
2012–2013	LionsXII	11	(0)
2013	Young Lions	22	(1)
2014–2015	LionsXII	9	(0)
2016	Hougang United	8	(2)
2017–2019	Balestier Khalsa	50	(6)
2020–2023	Tanjong Pagar United	63	(1)
2024	Yishun Sentek Mariners	0	(0)
2025–	Tanjong Pagar United	16	(0)

International career^{‡}
2012	Singapore	3	(0)
- * Club domestic league appearances and goals as of 19 July 2022 ‡ National team caps and goals as of 16 October 2012

Muhammad Raihan bin Abdul Rahman (born 7 February 1991), better known as Raihan Rahman or just Raihan, is a Singaporean professional footballer who plays either as a midfielder or defender for Singapore Premier League club Tanjong Pagar United.

== Club career ==
=== Young Lions ===
Raihan began his professional football career with Under-23 side Young Lions in the S.League in 2009.

=== LionsXII ===
It was announced in 2011 that Raihan would be joining the newly formed LionsXII to compete and participate in the 2012 Malaysia Super League. However, he left the club in the mid transfer window in 2013.

=== Young Lions ===
After he left the club, he signed for the Under-23 team, Young Lions

=== LionsXII ===
Raihan then later returned to the LionsXII at the end of the 2013 S.League season and was stayed in the club for 2 years, from 2014 to 2015. However, injuries meant that Raihan only made 9 appearances for the LionsXII in all competitions.

=== Hougang United ===
Following the disbandment of the LionsXII, Raihan signed for Hougang United for the 2016 S.League season. While clubs like Warriors FC and Geylang International were rumoured to be interested in his services, he chose Hougang because they were his first club, having trained with Sengkang Punggol as a 15 year old. Despite some fine performances, he was released by the Cheetahs at the end of the season.

=== Balestier Khalsa ===
Raihan came close to retiring before it was announced on Balestier Khalsa's Facebook and Instagram page on 5 January 2017 that he would be joining the Tigers ahead of the 2017 S.League campaign. He made his debut for the club against Warriors and scored a debut goal by a penalty. He scored his second goal for the Tigers through a stupendous free kick, handing his side a 2-1 win against Brunei DPMM FC in the Tigers' 5th league game of the season.

His injury in a match against Hougang United in 2018 rendered him unable to continue playing in the season, causing Head Coach Marko Kraljevic to find replacements.

== International career ==
Raihan is a versatile player that can play both in defence as well as in midfield. By the age of 20, Raihan had been involved in many international tournaments at youth levels, including a bronze medal in the 2009 Southeast Asian Games. Raihan made his international debut in 2010 against Poland in a 6-1 loss. In 2011, he received another call-up to the national team as Radojko Avramović named him in the 33-man provisional squad for the 2014 FIFA World Cup Qualifiers. He was in the starting line up for the first time against Jordan on 12 November 2011. He made his third appearance in a 4-0 loss against Syria on 15 November 2013.

Due to injuries, Raihan did not get any call ups from 2015 onwards.

== Controversy ==
In 2017, Raihan was charge for an act of misconduct for allegedly using a racial slur by Jordan Webb during an off-the-field altercation. Webb claimed Raihan had called him a "n*****" in the 75th minute of the match. “I heard it loud and clear, 1,000 per cent. Raihan wouldn’t be able to sit here to my face and say he didn’t” said Webb in the newspaper report. Raihan was cleared of all charges by the Football Association of Singapore Disciplinary Committee (DC) and demanded an apology from Webb. K Bala Chandran, chair of the DC, noted that the evidence was inconclusive and the members of the DC had "doubts over what happened".

== Others ==
=== Singapore Selection Squad ===
He was selected as part of the Singapore Selection squad for The Sultan of Selangor’s Cup to be held on 6 May 2017.

== Career statistics ==
=== Club ===
As of match played 2 July 22. Caps and goals may not be correct.

Club	Season	S.League		Singapore Cup		Singapore League Cup		Asia		Total	
Club	Season	Apps	Goals	Apps	Goals	Apps	Goals	Apps	Goals	Apps	Goals
Young Lions	2009	12	0	-	-	1	0	—		13	0
Young Lions	2010	6	0	-	-	-	-	—		6	0
Young Lions	2011	4	0	—		—		—		4	0
Young Lions	Total	22	0	0	0	1	0	0	0	23	0
Club	Season	Malaysia Super League		Malaysia FA Cup		Malaysia Cup		Asia		Total	
LionsXII	2012	7	0	0	0	1	0	—		8	0
LionsXII	2013	4	0	1	0	0	0	—		5	0
LionsXII	Total	11	0	1	0	1	0	0	0	13	0
Club	Season	S.League		Singapore Cup		Singapore League Cup		Asia		Total	
Young Lions	2013	18	1	1	0	3	0	—		22	1
Young Lions	Total	18	1	1	0	3	0	0	0	22	1
Club	Season	Malaysia Super League		Malaysia FA Cup		Malaysia Cup		Asia		Total	
LionsXII	2014	9	0	1	0	0	0	—		10	0
LionsXII	2015	??	??	??	??	??	??	—		??	??
LionsXII	Total	9	0	1	0	0	0	0	0	10	0
Club	Season	S.League		Singapore Cup		Singapore League Cup		Asia		Total	
Hougang United	2016	21	2	1	0	4	0	Not qualified		26	2
Hougang United	Total	21	2	1	0	4	0	0	0	26	2
Balestier Khalsa	2017	21	4	1	1	3	1	—		25	6
Balestier Khalsa	2018	5	0	0	0	0	0	—		5	0
Balestier Khalsa	2019	16	0	0	0	0	0	—		16	0
Balestier Khalsa	Total	42	4	1	1	3	1	0	0	46	6
Tanjong Pagar United	2020	11	0	0	0	0	0	Not qualified		11	0
Tanjong Pagar United	2021	8	0	0	0	0	0	Not qualified		8	0
Tanjong Pagar United	2022	24	1	3	0	0	0	Not qualified		27	1
Tanjong Pagar United	2023	20	0	1	0	0	0	Not qualified		21	0
Tanjong Pagar United	2024-25	12	0	4	0	0	0	Not qualified		16	0
Tanjong Pagar United	Total	75	1	8	0	0	0	0	0	83	1
Career Total		198	8	13	1	12	1	0	0	223	10

- Young Lions and LionsXII are ineligible for qualification to AFC competitions in their respective leagues.
- Young Lions withdrew from the Singapore Cup and Singapore League Cup in 2011 due to scheduled participation in the 2011 AFF U-23 Youth Championship.
