= 2020 Geylang International FC season =

Geylang International
2020 season
- Chairman: Ben Teng
- Head coach: Mohd Noor Ali
- Stadium: Our Tampines Hub
Home colours	Away colours

The 2020 season was Geylang International's 25th consecutive season in the top flight of Singapore football and in the Singapore Premier League. Along with the Singapore Premier League, the club also competed in the Singapore Cup.

== Squad ==
=== Sleague ===
No.	Name	Nationality	Date of birth (age)	Previous club	Contract Since	Contract End
Goalkeepers
1	Hairul Syirhan	(Singapore)	21 August 1995 (age 31)	(Singapore) Young Lions FC	2019	2020
23	Wayne Chew ^{U23}	(Singapore)	22 October 2001 (age 24)	Youth Team	2019	2020
25	Zainol Gulam	(Singapore)	4 February 1992 (age 34)	(Singapore) Warriors FC	2018	2020
Defenders
2	Shahrin Saberin	(Singapore)	14 February 1995 (age 31)	(Singapore) Home United	2019	2020
3	Adam Hakeem ^{U23}	(Singapore)	17 March 1997 (age 29)	(Singapore) Young Lions FC	2020	2020
4	Nurullah Hussein	(Singapore)	9 May 1993 (age 33)	(Singapore) Balestier Khalsa	2020	2020
5	Darren Teh (Captain)	(Singapore)	9 September 1996 (age 30)	(Singapore) SAFSA (NFL)	2017	2020
11	Harith Kanadi ^{U23}	(Singapore)	1 August 2000 (age 26)	(Singapore) Tampines Rovers U19	2019	2020
15	Kamolidin Tashiev ^{U21}	(Kyrgyzstan)	9 February 2000 (age 26)	(Kyrgyzstan) FC Abdysh-Ata Kant (T1)	2020	2020
21	Yuki Ichikawa	(Japan)	29 August 1987 (age 39)	(Singapore) Albirex Niigata (S)	2014	2020
Midfielders
6	Nur Luqman ^{U23}	(Singapore) (Indonesia)	20 June 1998 (age 28)	(Singapore) Young Lions FC	2020	2020
8	Barry Maguire	(Netherlands) (Republic of Ireland)	27 October 1989 (age 36)	(Republic of Ireland) Limerick F.C.	2019	2020
16	Umar Ramle	(Singapore)	2 May 1996 (age 30)	Youth Team	2016	2020
17	Firdaus Kasman ^{>30}	(Singapore)	24 January 1988 (age 38)	(Singapore) Warriors FC	2019	2020
18	Azri Suhaili ^{U23}	(Singapore)	12 July 2002 (age 24)	Youth Team	2019	2020
22	Christopher van Huizen	(Singapore)	28 November 1992 (age 33)	(Singapore) Home United	2019	2020
28	Safirul Sulaiman	(Singapore)	12 October 1992 (age 33)	(Singapore) Tampines Rovers	2020	2020
Forwards
7	Amy Recha	(Singapore) (Indonesia)	13 May 1992 (age 34)	(Singapore) Home United	2019	2020
9	Khairul Nizam	(Singapore)	25 June 1991 (age 35)	(Singapore) Warriors FC	2020	2020
10	Fareez Farhan	(Singapore)	29 July 1994 (age 32)	(Singapore) Hougang United	2019	2020
14	Iqbal Hussain	(Singapore)	6 June 1993 (age 33)	(Singapore) Hougang United	2020	
20	Zikos Vasileios Chua ^{U23}	(Singapore) (Greece)	15 April 2002 (age 24)	(Singapore) NFA U16	2018	2020
Players loaned out / placed on injury list / left during season
	Nasrul Taib ^{U23}	(Singapore)	10 October 1997 (age 28)	(Singapore) Tiong Bahru FC	2020	2020
13	Gilson Varela	(Cape Verde) (Portugal)	12 May 1990 (age 36)	(Portugal) Castelo Branco (T3)	2020	2020
13	Joshua Pereira ^{U23}	(Singapore)	10 October 1997 (age 28)	(Singapore) Young Lions FC	2020	2020
19	Noor Ariff ^{U23}	(Singapore)	6 September 1998 (age 28)	Youth Team	2017	2020
24	Panagiotis Linardos	(Greece)	7 August 1991 (age 35)	(Greece) Panachaiki F.C. (T2)	2020	2020

== Coaching staff ==
Position	Name	Ref.
Chairman	(Singapore) Thomas Gay	
General Manager	(Singapore) Leonard Koh	
Head coach	(Singapore) Mohd Noor Ali	
Assistant coach	(Singapore) Khidhir Khamis	
Fitness coach	(Singapore) Muzhaffar Shah	
Goalkeeping coach	(Singapore) Shahril Jantan	
Team Manager	(Singapore)	
Physiotherapist	(Singapore)	
Sports Trainer	(Singapore) Daniel Feriza	
Kitman	(Singapore) Abdul Latiff	

== Transfers ==
=== Pre-season transfers ===
==== In ====
Position	Player	Transferred From	Ref
GK	(Singapore) Dylan Christopher Goh	(Singapore) Young Lions FC	
DF	(Singapore) Nurullah Hussein	(Singapore) Balestier Khalsa	
DF	(Kyrgyzstan) Kamolidin Tashiev	(Kyrgyzstan) FC Abdysh-Ata Kant	
MF	(Singapore) Joshua Pereira	(Singapore) Young Lions FC	
MF	(Singapore) (Indonesia) Nur Luqman	(Singapore) Young Lions FC	
MF	(Greece) Panagiotis Linardos	(Greece) Panachaiki F.C. (Tier 2)	1 Year deal signed 2019
FW	(Singapore) Khairul Nizam	(Singapore) Warriors FC	
FW	(Cape Verde) (Portugal) Gilson Varela	(Portugal) Sport Benfica e Castelo Branco (Tier 3)	
FW	(Singapore) Iqbal Hussain	(Singapore) Hougang United	

Note 1: Gilson Varela left the club before season start due to personal reason.

==== Out ====
Position	Player	Transferred To	Ref
DF	(Singapore) Anders Aplin	(Singapore) Hougang United	1 year contract signed in 2019
DF	(Singapore) Jufri Taha	(Singapore) Balestier Khalsa	Free
DF	(Singapore) Danish Irfan	(Singapore) Young Lions FC	Free
MF	(Singapore) Syahiran Miswan		
MF	(Singapore) Bryan Tan		
MF	(Singapore) Asshukrie Wahid		
FW	(Singapore) Shawal Anuar	(Singapore) Hougang United	2 years deal signed in 2019
FW	(Singapore) Ifwat Ismail		NS till 2021
FW	(New Zealand) Matthew Palmer	(New Zealand) Eastern Suburbs AFC	
FW	(Singapore) Fikri Junaidi	(Singapore) Young Lions FC	Season loan
FW	(Cape Verde) (Portugal) Gilson Varela	(Portugal) Sporting Clube de São João de Ver	

==== Extension / Retained ====
Position	Player	Ref
Coach	(Singapore) Mohd Noor Ali	3 years extension
GK	(Singapore) Zainol Gulam	
GK	(Singapore) Hairul Syirhan	
DF	(Singapore) Shahrin Saberin	
DF	(Singapore) Darren Teh	
DF	(Japan) Yuki Ichikawa	
MF	(Singapore) Noor Ariff	
MF	(Singapore) Umar Ramle	
MF	(Singapore) Firdaus Kasman	
MF	(Singapore) Christopher van Huizen	
MF	(Netherlands) (Republic of Ireland) Barry Maguire	
FW	(Singapore) (Indonesia) Amy Recha	
FW	(Singapore) Fareez Farhan	

==== Promoted ====
Position	Player	Ref
DF	(Singapore) Harith Kanadi	
MF	(Singapore) Azri Suhaili	
FW	(Singapore) (Greece) Zikos Vasileios Chua	

==== Trial (In) ====
Position	Player	Trial From	Ref
MF	(India) Jayan Varghese	(Singapore) Jungfrau Punggol FC	

==== Trial (Out) ====
Position	Player	Trial With	Ref
MF	(Netherlands) (Republic of Ireland) Barry Maguire	(Malaysia) Penang FA	

=== Mid-season transfer ===
==== In ====
Position	Player	Transferred From	Ref
MF	(Singapore) Nasrul Taib	(Singapore) Tiong Bahru FC	
MF	(Singapore) Safirul Sulaiman	(Singapore) Tampines Rovers	Undisclosed
DF	(Singapore) Adam Hakeem	Free Agent	

==== Out ====
Position	Player	Transferred To	Ref
MF	(Greece) Panagiotis Linardos	(Greece) Diagoras F.C.	
MF	(Singapore) Joshua Pereira	(Singapore) SAFSA	NS till 2022
MF	(Singapore) Noor Ariff	(Singapore) SAFSA	NS till 2022
MF	(Singapore) Nasrul Taib		

== Friendlies ==
=== Pre-season friendlies ===
Win Draw Loss

11 January 2020 1	Siglap FC (Singapore)	1–4	(Singapore) Geylang International	Turf City Pitch 2
	Goal		Amirul Naim Shahruddin; Nur Luqman; Amy Recha

18 January 2020 2	Geylang International (Singapore)	2–0	(Singapore) SAFSA	Our Tampines Hub
	Christopher van Huizen; Gilson Varela

23 January 2020 3	Geylang International (Singapore)	0–3	(Singapore) Young Lions FC	Our Tampines Hub
			Goal

8 February 2020 4	Tanjong Pagar United (Singapore)	4–0	(Singapore) Geylang International	Jurong West Stadium

9 February 2020 5	Perak FA (Malaysia)	4–0	(Singapore) Geylang International	Jurong West Stadium
	Shahrel Fikri 19' 56' 64' (pen.); Careca 50' (pen.)

12 February 2020 6	Johor Darul Ta'zim F.C. II (Malaysia)	3–1	(Singapore) Geylang International	Johor, Malaysia
	Fernando Rodríguez 42'; Amirul Husani 65'; Liridon Krasniqi 69' (pen.)		Khairul Nizam 50'	Stadium: Larkin Stadium

=== Tour of Malaysia ===
29 January 2020 Friendly	Selangor FA (Malaysia)	5–1	(Singapore) Geylang International	Selangor
	Ifedayo Olusegun; Sandro; Syazwan Zainon; Sean Selvaraj		Panagiotis Linardos	Stadium: Selayang Stadium

31 January 2020 Friendly	Selangor FA II (Malaysia)	6–1	(Singapore) Geylang International	Selangor
	Harith haikal Dani Armin; Farid Ashraf; Bajram Nebihi; Sharvin		Fareez Farhan	Stadium: Selayang Stadium

=== Tour of Indonesia ===
23 February 2020 Friendly	Persija Jakarta (Indonesia)	3–1	(Singapore) Geylang International	Jakarta
	Osvaldo Haay 6'; Marko Šimić 50'; Heri Susanto 82'		Panagiotis Linardos 69' (pen.)	Stadium: Gelora Bung Karno Stadium

== Team statistics ==
=== Appearances and goals ===
As of 29 September 2018.

No.	Pos.	Player	Sleague		Singapore Cup		Total	
No.	Pos.	Player	Apps.	Goals	Apps.	Goals	Apps.	Goals
1	GK	(Singapore) Hairul Syirhan	9(2)	0	0	0	11	0
2	DF	(Singapore) Shahrin Saberin	5(2)	1	0	0	7	1
3	DF	(Singapore) Adam Hakeem	6(1)	0	0	0	7	0
4	DF	(Singapore) Nurullah Hussein	1	0	0	0	1	0
5	DF	(Singapore) Darren Teh	14	1	0	0	14	1
6	MF	(Singapore) (Indonesia) Nur Luqman	10	0	0	0	10	0
7	FW	(Singapore) (Indonesia) Amy Recha	5(7)	2	0	0	12	2
8	MF	(Netherlands) (Republic of Ireland) Barry Maguire	13	3	0	0	13	3
9	FW	(Singapore) Khairul Nizam	5(4)	4	0	0	9	4
10	FW	(Singapore) Fareez Farhan	6(4)	1	0	0	10	1
11	DF	(Singapore) Harith Kanadi	13	0	0	0	13	0
14	FW	(Singapore) Iqbal Hussain	4(10)	2	0	0	14	2
15	DF	(Kyrgyzstan) Kamolidin Tashiev	3(2)	0	0	0	5	0
16	MF	(Singapore) Umar Ramle	6(2)	0	0	0	8	0
17	MF	(Singapore) Firdaus Kasman	13	0	0	0	13	0
18	MF	(Singapore) Azri Suhaili	3	0	0	0	3	0
20	FW	(Singapore) (Greece) Zikos Vasileios Chua	3(2)	0	0	0	5	0
21	DF	(Japan) Yuki Ichikawa	14	0	0	0	14	0
22	MF	(Singapore) Christopher van Huizen	8(5)	2	0	0	13	2
23	GK	(Singapore) Wayne Chew	1	0	0	0	1	0
25	GK	(Singapore) Zainol Gulam	4	0	0	0	4	0
28	MF	(Singapore) Safirul Sulaiman	1(4)	0	0	0	5	0
Players who have played this season but had left the club or on loan to other club
13	MF	(Singapore) Joshua Pereira	3	0	0	0	3	0
19	MF	(Singapore) Noor Ariff	2	0	0	0	2	0
24	MF	(Greece) Panagiotis Linardos	1(1)	0	0	0	2	0

== Competitions ==
=== Overview ===
Competition	Record							
Competition	P	W	D	L	GF	GA	GD	Win %

=== Singapore Premier League ===
Win Draw Loss

29 February 2020 1	Albirex Niigata (S) (Singapore)	4–0	(Singapore) Geylang International	Jurong East Stadium
	Reo Nishiguchi 40'; Ryosuke Nagasawa 52'; Tomoyuki Doi 59' (pen.); Ryoya Tanigushi 74'; Gareth Low (yellow card) 38'; Rio Sakuma (yellow card) 75'	Report	Fareez Farhan (red card) 49'; Shahrin Saberin (red card) 59'; Joshua Pereira (yellow card) 28'; Iqbal Hussain (yellow card) 75'	Attendance: 2,522; Referee: Muhammad Zulfiqar; Man of the Match: (Japan) Reo Nishiguchi

11 March 2020 2	Geylang International (Singapore)	3–0	(Singapore) Young Lions FC	Our Tampines Hub
	Iqbal Hussain 18' 57'; Khairul Nizam 75'; Noor Ariff (yellow card) 44'; Firdaus Kasman (yellow card) 45'; Barry Maguire (yellow card) 72'; Joshua Pereira (yellow card) 83'	Report	Jacob Mahler (yellow card) 88'	Attendance: 1,178; Referee: Nathan Chan; Man of the Match: (Singapore) Iqbal Hussain

15 March 2020 3	Hougang United (Singapore)	1–2	(Singapore) Geylang International	Hougang Stadium
	Shawal Anuar 81'; Anders Aplin (yellow card) 44'	Report	Christopher van Huizen 15' 49'; Firdaus Kasman (yellow card) 65'; Joshua Pereira (yellow card) 90+4'	Attendance: 0 (Note: Due to Covid 19, this match is played behind closed door.); Referee: Farhan Mohd; Man of the Match: (Singapore) Christopher van Huizen

18 October 2020 4 (Rescheduled) (Note: The match is postponed following the coronavirus pandemic.)	Lion City Sailors (Singapore)	4–0	(Singapore) Geylang International	Bishan Stadium
	Stipe Plazibat 7' 85'; Song Ui-young 45+5' (pen.); Shahril Ishak 90'; Naqiuddin Eunos (yellow card) 66'; Tajeli Salamat (yellow card) 78'	Report	Zainol Gulam (red card) 45'	Attendance: 0 Referee: Farhan Mohd; Man of the Match: (Croatia) Stipe Plazibat

24 October 2020 5 (Rescheduled)	Geylang International (Singapore)	2–3	(Singapore) Balestier Khalsa	Our Tampines Hub
	khairul Nizam 33' (yellow card) 50'; Barry Maguire 90+4'; Hairul Syirhan 80' (o.g.) (yellow card) 45'	Report	Kristijan Krajcek 60'; Hazzuwan Halim 66'; Ahmad Syahir (yellow card) 38'; Keshav Kumar (yellow card) 58'	Attendance: 0 Referee: Lim Liang Yi; Man of the Match: (Croatia) Kristijan Krajcek

4 November 2020 6 (Rescheduled)	Tanjong Pagar United (Singapore)	0–3	(Singapore) Geylang International	Jurong East Stadium
	Raihan Rahman (yellow card) 44'	Report	Khairul Nizam 61'	Attendance: 0 Referee: Muhammad Taqi; Man of the Match: (Singapore) Khairul Nizam

7 November 2020 7 (Rescheduled)	Geylang International (Singapore)	1–1	(Singapore) Tampines Rovers	Our Tampines Hub
	Khairul Nizam 22'; Firdaus Kasman (yellow card) 39'; Adam Hakeem (yellow card) 41' (yellow-red card) 54'; Barry Maguire (yellow card) 80'; Hairul Syirhan (yellow card) 90+4'	Report	Boris Kopitović 12'; Jordan Webb (yellow card) 71'; Irwan Shah (yellow card) 85'; Yasir Hanapi (yellow card) 90'	Attendance: 0 Referee: Farhan Mohd; Man of the Match: (Singapore) Khairul Nizam

13 November 2020 8 (Rescheduled)	Geylang International (Singapore)	0–1	(Singapore) Albirex Niigata (S)	Our Tampines Hub
	Yuki Ichikawa (yellow card) 3'; Kamolidin Tashiev (yellow card) 21'; Barry Maguire (yellow card) 90+1'	Report	Tomoyuki Doi 10'; Ryoya Tanigushi (yellow card) 78'; Kotaro Takeda (yellow card) 90'	Attendance: 0 Referee: Ahmad A'Qashah; Man of the Match: (Japan) Tomoyuki Doi

17 November 2020 9 (Rescheduled)	Geylang International (Singapore)	2–1	(Singapore) Tanjong Pagar United	Our Tampines Hub
	Shahrin Saberin 23'; Fareez Farhan 69'; Harith Kanadi (yellow card) 90'	Report	Luiz Júnior 80'; Takahiro Tanaka (yellow card) 12'	Attendance: 0 Referee: Juherman Zaiton; Man of the Match: (Netherlands) Barry Maguire

21 November 2020 10 (Rescheduled)	Geylang International (Singapore)	2–0	(Singapore) Hougang United	Our Tampines Hub
	Barry Maguire 42'; Amy Recha 59'; Yuki Ichikawa (yellow card) 30'; Firdaus Kasman (yellow card) 83'	Report	Nazrul Nazari (yellow card) 90+1'	Attendance: 0 Referee: Jansen Foo; Man of the Match: (Netherlands) Barry Maguire

25 November 2020 11 (Rescheduled)	Geylang International (Singapore)	0–3	(Singapore) Lion City Sailors F.C.	Our Tampines Hub
	Harith Kanadi (yellow card) 52'	Report	Song Ui-young 71'; Gabriel Quak 86'; Kaishu Yamazaki 90+1'; Arshad Shamim (yellow card) 49'	Attendance: 0 Referee: Syarqawi Buhari; Man of the Match: (Japan) Kaishu Yamazaki

28 November 2020 12 (Rescheduled)	Balestier Khalsa (Singapore)	2–0	(Singapore) Geylang International	Bishan Stadium
	Kristijan Krajcek 48'; Hazzuwan Halim 58'; R Aaravin (yellow card) 37'; Shuhei Hoshino (yellow card) 90'	Report	Yuki Ichikawa (yellow card) 34'; Christopher van Huizen (yellow card) 82'	Attendance: 0 Referee: Muhammad Zulfiqar; Man of the Match: (Singapore) R Aaravin

2 December 2020 13 (Rescheduled)	Young Lions FC (Singapore)	1–2	(Singapore) Geylang International	Jurong West Stadium
	Zamani Zamri 80' (pen.); Syed Akmal (yellow card) 45+3'; Harhys Stewart (yellow card) 66'; Ilhan Fandi (yellow card) 70'	Report	Darren Teh 51' (yellow card) 81'; Amy Recha 86' (pen.); Iqbal Hussain (yellow card) 19'; Azri Suhaili (yellow card) 21'; Christopher van Huizen (yellow card) 61'; Khairul Nizam (red card) 61'	Attendance: 0 Referee: Y. Sathyakumar; Man of the Match: (Singapore) Christopher van Huizen

5 December 2020 14 (Rescheduled)	Tampines Rovers (Singapore)	1–1	(Singapore) Geylang International	Our Tampines Hub
	Andrew Aw (yellow card) 44'; Baihakki Khaizan 79' (yellow card) 66'	Report	Barry Maguire 24'; Firdaus Kasman (yellow card) 34' (red card) 90+7'; Amy Recha (yellow card) 61'; Umar Akhbar (yellow card) 78'; Darren Teh (yellow card) 87'; Hairul Syirhan (yellow card) 90+1'	Attendance: 0 Referee: Ahmad A'Qashah; Man of the Match: (Singapore) Baihakki Khaizan

Pos	Team	Pld	W	D	L	GF	GA	GD	Pts	Qualification or relegation
1	Albirex Niigata (S) (Note: The foreign club – Albirex Niigata (S) – as well as the Football Association of Singapore (FAS) under-21 team, Young Lions, are ineligible for any AFC competition spots.) (C)	14	10	2	2	32	14	+18	32	
2	Tampines Rovers	14	8	5	1	27	11	+16	29	Qualification for AFC Champions League group stage
3	Lion City Sailors	14	8	3	3	44	18	+26	27	Qualification for AFC Cup group stage
4	Geylang International	14	6	2	6	18	22	−4	20	Qualification for AFC Cup group stage
5	Balestier Khalsa	14	5	4	5	22	28	−6	19	
6	Hougang United	14	4	3	7	19	24	−5	15	
7	Young Lions	14	3	0	11	12	38	−26	9	
8	Tanjong Pagar United	14	0	5	9	14	33	−19	5	

Source: Singapore Premier League
Rules for classification: 1) points; 2) goal difference; 3) number of goals scored; 4) number of wins
(C) Champions

=== Singapore Cup ===
Win Draw Loss
