= 2019 Geylang International FC season =

Geylang International
2019 season
- Chairman: Ben Teng
- Head coach: (Singapore) Mohd Noor Ali
- Stadium: Our Tampines Hub
Home colours	Away colours

The 2019 season was Geylang International's 24th consecutive season in the top flight of Singapore football and in the Singapore Premier League. Along with the Singapore Premier League, the club also competed in the Singapore Cup.

== Key events ==
=== Pre-season ===
1. On 26/9/2018, it was reported that Geylang International is interested in bringing Song Ui-young to Bedok Stadium together with their former coach, Lee Lim Saeng for Season 2019. Joining the Eagles to express interest is Indonesian giants Persija Jakarta.
2. On 30/10/2018, the team announced their 1st signing of the 2019 season. Shahrin Saberin officially joined from Home United after his contract ended.
3. On 31/10/2018, the team announced that Zainol Gulam is the 1st player to sign an extension to their contract.

=== In-season ===
1. On 24/4/2019, Syahiran Miswan was banned for 3 matches for committing an act of violent conduct on opponent at the 64th minute of play against Warriors FC.

== Squad ==
=== Sleague ===
No.	Name	Nationality	Date of Birth (Age)	Previous Club	Contract Since	Contract End
Goalkeepers
1	Hairul Syirhan	(Singapore)	21 August 1995 (age 31)	(Singapore) Young Lions FC	2019	2019
25	Zainol Gulam	(Singapore)	4 February 1992 (age 34)	(Singapore) Warriors FC	2018	2019
Defenders
2	Anders Aplin	(Singapore) (England)	21 June 1991 (age 35)	(Singapore) SRC (Ex NFL)	2016	
3	Jufri Taha ^{>30}	(Singapore)	4 March 1985 (age 41)	(Singapore) Tampines Rovers	2018	2019
4	Shahrin Saberin	(Singapore)	14 February 1995 (age 31)	(Singapore) Home United	2019	2019
5	Darren Teh ^{U23} (Captain)	(Singapore)	9 September 1996 (age 30)	(Singapore) SAFSA (NFL D1)	2017	2019
14	Danish Irfan ^{U23}	(Singapore)	10 March 1999 (age 27)	(Singapore) NFA U18	2018	2019
21	Yuki Ichikawa	(Japan)	29 August 1987 (age 39)	(Singapore) Albirex Niigata (S)	2014	2019
Midfielders
6	Syahiran Miswan	(Singapore)	22 January 1994 (age 32)	(Singapore) Hougang United	2019	2019
8	Barry Maguire	(Netherlands) (Republic of Ireland)	27 October 1989 (age 37)	(Republic of Ireland) Limerick F.C.	2019	2019
9	Noor Ariff ^{U23}	(Singapore)	6 September 1998 (age 28)	Youth Team	2017	2019
15	Bryan Tan ^{U23}	(Singapore)	7 May 1996 (age 30)		2019	2019
16	Umar Ramle ^{U23}	(Singapore)	2 May 1996 (age 30)	Youth Team	2016	2019
17	Firdaus Kasman ^{>30}	(Singapore)	24 January 1988 (age 38)	(Singapore) Warriors FC	2019	2019
19	Asshukrie Wahid ^{U23}	(Singapore)	27 February 1997 (age 29)	(Singapore) Young Lions FC	2019	2019
22	Christopher van Huizen	(Singapore)	28 November 1992 (age 33)	(Singapore) Home United	2019	
Forwards
7	Amy Recha	(Singapore) (Indonesia)	13 May 1992 (age 34)	(Singapore) Home United	2019	2019
10	Shawal Anuar	(Singapore)	29 April 1991 (age 35)	(Singapore) Keppel Monaco (Ex NFL)	2014	2019
11	Fareez Farhan	(Singapore)	29 July 1994 (age 32)	(Singapore) Hougang United	2019	2019
13	Matthew Palmer ^{U19}	(New Zealand)	16 February 2000 (age 26)	(Denmark) Vejle Boldklub U19	2019	2019
23	Ifwat Ismail ^{U23}	(Singapore)	27 March 1997 (age 29)	(Singapore) Young Lions FC	2019	2019
Players loaned out / placed on injury list / left during season
20	Corey Warren ^{U19}	(Australia)	27 April 2000 (age 26)	(Australia) Australasian Soccer Academy	2019	2019

== Coaching staff ==
Position	Name	Ref.
Head Coach	(Singapore) Mohd Noor Ali	
Assistant Coach	(Singapore) Syed Azmir	
Goalkeeping Coach	(Thailand) Sarong Naiket	
Goalkeeping Coach	(Singapore) Shahril Jantan	
Team Manager	(Singapore) Andrew Ang	
Physiotherapist	(Singapore)	
Kitman		

== Transfers ==
=== Pre-season transfers ===
==== In ====
Position	Player	Transferred From	Ref
Coach	(Singapore) Mohd Noor Ali	(Japan) Matsumoto Yamaga	End of Exchange
GK	(Singapore) Hairul Syirhan	(Singapore) Young Lions FC	
DF	(Singapore) Anders Aplin	(Japan) Matsumoto Yamaga	Loan Return
DF	(Singapore) Shahrin Saberin	(Singapore) Home United	
MF	(Singapore) Syahiran Miswan	(Singapore) Hougang United	
MF	(Singapore) Chris van Huizen	(Singapore) Home United	
MF	(Singapore) Firdaus Kasman	(Singapore) Warriors FC	
MF	(Singapore) Asshukrie Wahid	(Singapore) Young Lions FC	Loan Return
MF	(Netherlands) (Republic of Ireland) Barry Maguire	(Republic of Ireland) Limerick F.C.	
MF	(Australia) Mortaza Safdari	(Australia) Australasian Soccer Academy	Season loan
FW	(Singapore) Amy Recha	(Singapore) Home United	
FW	(Singapore) Ifwat Ismail	(Singapore) Young Lions FC	Loan Return
FW	(Singapore) Fareez Farhan	(Singapore) Hougang United	

==== Out ====
Position	Player	Transferred To	Ref
Coach	(Japan) Hirotaka Usui	Redesignated	End of Exchange
GK	(Singapore) Jasper Chan		
GK	(Malaysia) Faris Danial	(Singapore) Balestier Khalsa	Free
GK	(Singapore) Syed Syazwan		
DF	(Singapore) Afiq Yunos	(Singapore) Tampines Rovers	Loan Return
DF	(Singapore) Ahmad Zaki	(Singapore) Balestier Khalsa	Free
DF	(Singapore) Zulfadli Zainal Abidin	(Singapore) Tiong Bahru FC (NFL D1)	
DF	(Singapore) Yeo Hai Ngee	(Singapore) Warriors FC	
MF	(Singapore) Azhar Sairudin	(Singapore) Yishun Sentek Mariners FC (NFL D1)	
MF	(Singapore) Sadiq Rahim	(Singapore) Balestier United (NFL D1)	
MF	(Singapore) Fuad Ramli	(Singapore) Bishan Barx FC (NFL D1)	
MF	(Singapore) Ryson Yap	(Singapore) Police SA (NFL D1)	
MF	(Singapore) Farish Khan		
MF	(Japan) Fumiya Kogure	(Cambodia) Soltilo Angkor FC	
MF	(Singapore) Ryan Syaffiq	(Singapore) Tiong Bahru FC (NFL D1)	
FW	(Singapore) Cameron Ayrton Bell	(Singapore) Tiong Bahru FC (NFL D1)	
FW	(Singapore) Fairoz Hassan	(Singapore) Warriors FC	

==== Retained ====
Position	Player	Ref

==== Extension ====
Position	Player	Ref
GK	(Singapore) Zainol Gulam	
DF	(Singapore) Darren Teh	
DF	(Singapore) Danish Irfan Azman	
DF	(Singapore) Jufri Taha	
MF	(Japan) Yuki Ichikawa	
MF	(Singapore) Noor Ariff	
FW	(Singapore) Shawal Anuar	

==== Promoted ====
Position	Player	Ref

==== Trial ====
Position	Player	Trial From	Ref
FW	(Costa Rica) Víctor Coto Ortega	Free Agent	
MF	(Australia) Parham Khosravi	(Australia) Australasian Soccer Academy	
DF	(Australia) Morteza Safdari	(Australia) Australasian Soccer Academy	

=== Mid-season transfer ===
==== In ====
Position	Player	Transferred From	Ref
FW	(New Zealand) Matthew Palmer	Free Agent	
MF	(Singapore) Bryan Tan	(Singapore) SAFSA (NFL D1)	

==== Out ====
Position	Player	Transferred To	Ref
FW	(Australia) Corey Warren	(Lithuania) FC Vilniaus Vytis	

== Friendlies ==
=== Pre-season friendlies ===
Win Draw Loss

5 January 2019 1	Yishun Sentek Mariners FC (Singapore) (NFL)	3–2	(Singapore) Geylang International	The Arena
7pm

9 January 2019 2	Hibernians FC (Singapore) (Cosmo League)	0–6	(Singapore) Geylang International	Jalan Besar Stadium
7pm

12 January 2019 3	SAFSA (Singapore) (NFL)	1–1	(Singapore) Geylang International	Jalan Besar Stadium
7pm

13 January 2019 4	PKNS FC (Malaysia)	2–0	(Singapore) Geylang International	Jalan Besar Stadium
7pm	K. Gurusamy 76'; Faizat Ghazli 80'

18 January 2019 5	Global Football Academy (Singapore) (NFL)	1–13	(Singapore) Geylang International	Bedok Stadium

19 January 2019 6	Admiralty FC (Singapore) (NFL)	2–12	(Singapore) Geylang International	Bedok Stadium
5pm

3 February 2019 7	Singapore Cricket Club (NFL)	0–2	(Singapore) Geylang International

10 February 2019 8	Singapore Khalsa Association Football (NFL)	1–7	(Singapore) Geylang International	Jalan Besar Stadium
5pm

17 February 2019 9	Ceres–Negros F.C. (Philippines)	1–0	(Singapore) Geylang International	Our Tampines Hub
745pm	Mike Ott

24 February 2019 10	SAFSA (Singapore) (NFL)	2–3	(Singapore) Geylang International
5pm			Christopher van Huizen; Shahrin Saberin; Fareez Farhan

23 March 2019 11	Johor Darul Ta'zim II F.C. (Malaysia)	5–1	(Singapore) Geylang International	Pasir Gudang Corporation Stadium
845pm			Amy Recha

Tour of Malaysia (20 to 27 January)

22 January 2019 1	UKM F.C. (Malaysia)	4–0	(Singapore) Geylang International	Kuala Lumpur
1645 hours	Michael Chukwubunna; Faiz Hanif; Mateo Roskam			Stadium: Stadium University

24 January 2019 2	Selangor FA (Malaysia)	cancelled	(Singapore) Geylang International	Shah Alam, Selangor
2045hours				Stadium: Shah Alam Stadium

26 January 2019 3	Negeri Sembilan FA (Malaysia)	2–1	(Singapore) Geylang International	Paroi, Negeri Sembilan
2045hours			Barry Maguire	Stadium: Tuanku Abdul Rahman Stadium

=== Mid-season friendlies ===
Win Draw Loss

1 June 2019 1	Simei United FC (Singapore) (IWL)	0–1	(Singapore) Geylang International	Meridian Junior College
730pm

== Team statistics ==
=== Appearances and goals ===
As of 29 September 2018.

No.	Pos.	Player	Sleague		Singapore Cup		Total	
No.	Pos.	Player	Apps.	Goals	Apps.	Goals	Apps.	Goals
1	GK	(Singapore) Hairul Syirhan	9(1)	0	0	0	10	0
2	DF	(Singapore) Anders Aplin	16(3)	0	6	0	22	0
3	DF	(Singapore) Jufri Taha	11(3)	0	1(2)	1	17	1
4	DF	(Singapore) Shahrin Saberin	6	0	4	0	10	0
5	DF	(Singapore) Darren Teh	23	0	6	0	29	0
6	MF	(Singapore) Syahiran Miswan	7(1)	0	0	0	8	0
7	FW	(Singapore) Amy Recha	14(9)	6	3(2)	0	28	6
8	MF	(Netherlands) (Republic of Ireland) Barry Maguire	21	5	6	0	27	5
9	MF	(Singapore) Noor Ariff	9(8)	2	5	0	22	2
10	FW	(Singapore) Shawal Anuar	12(2)	8	2	1	16	9
11	FW	(Singapore) Fareez Farhan	14(10)	9	4(1)	2	29	11
13	FW	(New Zealand) Matthew Palmer	0(6)	0	1(4)	0	11	0
14	DF	(Singapore) Danish Irfan	19	0	0	0	19	0
16	MF	(Singapore) Umar Ramle	14(2)	0	4(2)	0	22	0
17	MF	(Singapore) Firdaus Kasman	18(2)	1	4	0	24	1
21	DF	(Japan) Yuki Ichikawa	24	4	5	0	29	4
22	MF	(Singapore) Christopher van Huizen	16(5)	1	4(1)	0	26	1
23	FW	(Singapore) Ifwat Ismail	4(6)	0	0(2)	1	12	1
25	GK	(Singapore) Zainol Gulam	15	0	3	0	18	0
36	MF	(Singapore) Fikri Junaidi	2(2)	0	0	0	4	0
37	FW	(Singapore) (Greece) Zikos Vasileios Chua	7(3)	5	0	0	10	5
38	MF	(Singapore) Azri Suhaili	1(1)	0	0	0	2	0
39	MF	(Singapore) Danish Qayyum	0(1)	0	0	0	1	0
40	DF	(Singapore) Harith Kanadi	1	0	3(2)	0	6	0
42	MF	(Singapore) (South Korea) Gabriel Myong	0(1)	0	0	0	1	0
Players who have played this season but had left the club or on loan to other club
20	MF	(Australia) Corey Warren	0(1)	0	0	0	1	0

Note 1: Darren Teh scored an own goal against Balestier Khalsa on 31/3/2019.

== Competitions ==
=== Overview ===
Competition	Record							
Competition	P	W	D	L	GF	GA	GD	Win %
Singapore Premier League	24	10	3	11	41	48	−7	41.67
Singapore Cup	6	1	2	3	6	9	−3	16.67
Total	30	11	5	14	47	57	−10	36.67

=== Singapore Premier League ===
Win Draw Loss

2 March 2019 1	Geylang International (Singapore)	1–0	(Singapore) Albirex Niigata (S)	Our Tampines Hub
	Yuki Ichikawa 86'; Danish Irfan (yellow card) 41'; Umar Akhbar (yellow card) 47'; Zainol Gulam (yellow card) 90'			Referee: Jansen Foo

9 March 2019 2	Brunei DPMM	3–0	(Singapore) Geylang International	Hassanal Bolkiah National Stadium
	Blake Ricciuto 22' (yellow card) 40'; Andrey Varankow 88' (pen.); Razimie Ramlli 90'; Fakharrazi Hassan (yellow card) 17'		Ifwat Ismail (yellow card) 42'; Jufri Taha (yellow card) 64'; Noor Ariff (yellow card) 88'; Darren Teh (yellow card) 90'	Referee: Y.Sathyakumar

16 March 2019 3	Geylang International (Singapore)	0–1	(Singapore) Tampines Rovers	Our Tampines Hub
	Darren Teh (yellow card) 28'; Amy Recha (yellow card) 49'		Khairul Amri 12'; Jordan Webb (yellow card) 18'	Referee: Muhammad Zulfiqar

31 March 2019 4	Balestier Khalsa (Singapore)	3–0	(Singapore) Geylang International	Bishan Stadium
	Darren Teh 59' (o.g.); Hazzuwan Halim 64'; Kristijan Krajcek 84'; Fadli Kamis (yellow card) 45'; Nurullah Hussein (yellow card) 45'; Daniel Goh Ji Xiong (yellow card) 59'		Barry Maguire (yellow card) 45'	Referee: Muhammad Taqi

5 April 2019 5	Geylang International (Singapore)	5–2	(Singapore) Warriors FC	Our Tampines Hub
	Amy Recha 58' (pen.) 72'; Yuki Ichikawa 66'; Firdaus Kasman 83'; Fareez Farhan 88'; Shahrin Saberin (yellow card) 44'; Syahiran Miswan (yellow card) 62'		Ignatius Ang 21'; Fairoz Hassan 27'; Poh Yi Feng (red card) 62'; Suria Prakash (yellow card) 79'	Referee: G. Letchman

14 April 2019 6	Young Lions FC (Singapore)	0–1	(Singapore) Geylang International	Jalan Besar Stadium
			Zikos Vasileios Chua 47'; Danish Irfan (yellow card) 36'; Amy Recha (yellow card) 60'	Referee: Farhan Mohamed

20 April 2019 7	Hougang United (Singapore)	4–1	(Singapore) Geylang International	Jalan Besar Stadium
	Jordan Nicolas Vestering 7' (yellow card) 43'; Amir Zalani 54'; Afiq Yunos 67'; Fazrul Nawaz 83' (yellow card) 90'; Afiq Noor (yellow card) 51'		Barry Maguire 49'; Darren Teh (yellow card) 18'	Referee: Muhammad Zulfiqar

24 April 2019 8	Home United (Singapore)	3–0	(Singapore) Geylang International	Bishan Stadium
	Oliver Puflett 9', 42'; Adam Swandi 58'; Hami Syahin (yellow card) 65'; Izzdin Shafiq (red card) 84'		Anders Aplin (yellow card) 24'; Barry Maguire (red card) 82'	Referee: Y.Sathyakumar

5 May 2019 9	Albirex Niigata (S) (Singapore)	2–0	(Singapore) Geylang International	Jurong East Stadium
	Kyoga Nakamura 85' 90'		Umar Akhbar (yellow card) 54'; Darren Teh (yellow card) 62'; Noor Ariff (yellow card) 70' (yellow-red card) 79'	Referee: Jansen Foo

11 May 2019 10	Geylang International (Singapore)	1–3	Brunei DPMM	Our Tampines Hub
	Amy Recha 79'; Firdaus Kasman (yellow card) 15'; Danish Irfan Azman (yellow card) 37'; Christopher van Huizen (yellow card) 47'; Jufri Taha (yellow card) 64'; Umar Ramle (yellow card) 95'		Blake Ricciuto 13'; Andrey Varankow 16' 36'; Nur Ikhwan Othman (yellow card) 35'; Charlie Clough (yellow card) 74'; Abdul Azizi Ali Rahman (red card) 94'	Referee: G. Letchman

25 May 2019 11	Tampines Rovers (Singapore)	1–1	(Singapore) Geylang International	Our Tampines Hub
	Jordan Webb 21' (pen.)		Shawal Anuar 30'	Referee: Farhan Mohamed

16 June 2019 12	Geylang International (Singapore)	5–0	(Singapore) Balestier Khalsa	Our Tampines Hub
	Shawal Anuar 17' 45'; Barry Maguire 44' 48'; Yuki Ichikawa (yellow card) 76'; Umar Akhbar (yellow card) 54'			Referee: Nathan Chan

23 June 2019 13	Warriors FC (Singapore)	1–2	(Singapore) Geylang International	Jurong East Stadium
	Jonathan Béhé 37'		Zikos Vasileios Chua 79' 81'	Referee: Juherman Zaiton

29 June 2019 14	Geylang International (Singapore)	1–2	(Singapore) Young Lions FC	Our Tampines Hub
	Zikos Vasileios Chua 82'; Firdaus Kasman (yellow card) 52'; Shawal Anuar (red card) 85'		Rezza Rezky 1'; Nur Luqman 59'; Zulqarnaen Suzliman (yellow card) 62'	Referee: Abirami Naidu

5 July 2019 15	Geylang International (Singapore)	2–2	(Singapore) Hougang United	Our Tampines Hub
	Fareez Farhan 3' 38'		Fazrul Nawaz 14'; Hafiz Sujad 63'	Referee: Ahmad A'Qashah

12 July 2019 16	Geylang International (Singapore)	2–3	(Singapore) Home United	Our Tampines Hub
	Noor Ariff 2' 10'		Hafiz Nor 5' 24'; Hami Syahin 42'; Faritz Abdul Hameed (yellow card) 79'; Abdil Qaiyyim Mutalib (yellow card) 90'	Referee: Muhd Taqi

26 July 2019 17	Geylang International (Singapore)	1–0	(Singapore) Albirex Niigata (S)	Our Tampines Hub
	Zikos Vasileios Chua 90+5'; Umar Akhbar (yellow card) 24'; Yuki Ichikawa (yellow card) 37'; Christopher Van Huizen (yellow card) 56'		Sota Sugiyama (yellow card) 12'; Daichi Tanabe (yellow card) 76'; Kyoga Nakamura (yellow card) 78'; Makito Hatanaka (yellow card) 85'	Referee: Lim Liang Yi

2 August 2019 18	Brunei DPMM	3–0	(Singapore) Geylang International	Hassanal Bolkiah National Stadium
	Hakeme Yazid 47'; Hendra Azam Idris 53'; Adi Said 85'; Blake Ricciuto (yellow card) 49'; Abdul Azizi Ali Rahman (yellow card) 90'		Yuki Ichikawa (yellow card) 81'	Referee: Syahir Ahmadi

14 August 2019 19	Geylang International (Singapore)	2–1	(Singapore) Tampines Rovers	Jalan Besar Stadium
	Shawal Anuar 16'; Yuki Ichikawa 90'		Shahdan Sulaiman 44'	Referee: Nathan Chan

18 August 2019 20	Balestier Khalsa (Singapore)	3–4	(Singapore) Geylang International	Bishan Stadium
	Daniel Goh 65', 72'; Sime Zuzul 75'		Christopher Van Huizen 7'; Shawal Anuar 57'; Fareez Farhan 90+1'; Amy Recha 90+4'	Referee: Syarqawi Buhari

18 September 2019 21 (Rescheduled)	Geylang International (Singapore)	4–3	(Singapore) Warriors FC	Our Tampines Hub
	Shawal Anuar 4'; Barry Maguire 24'; Fareez Farhan 31' (pen.); Amy Recha 85' (pen.)		Faizal Raffi 23' 38'; Hairul Syirhan 81' (o.g.)	Referee: Farhan Mohamed

31 August 2019 22	Young Lions FC (Singapore)	1–2	(Singapore) Geylang International	Jalan Besar Stadium
	Rasaq Akeem 90+1'		Fareez Farhan 45'; Barry Maguire 63'	Referee: Y.Sathyakumar

15 September 2019 23	Geylang International (Singapore)	4–4	(Singapore) Hougang United	Our Tampines Hub
	Fareez Farhan 7' 11' 28'; Shawal Anuar 70'		Shahfiq Ghani 41' 75'; Faris Ramli 49' 80'	Referee: Muhammad Taqi

21 September 2019 24	Home United (Singapore)	3–2	(Singapore) Geylang International	Bishan Stadium
	Shahril Ishak 5' 6'; Song Ui-young 85'		Amy Recha (penalty missed) 42 42'; Shawal Anuar 86'	Referee: Syarqawi Buhari

Pos	Team	Pld	W	D	L	GF	GA	GD	Pts	Qualification or relegation
3	Hougang United	24	13	4	7	58	45	+13	43	Qualification for AFC Cup group stage
4	Albirex Niigata (S) (Note: The two foreign clubs – Albirex Niigata (S) and DPMM – as well as the Football Association of Singapore (FAS) under-21 team, Young Lions, are ineligible for any AFC competition spots.)	24	12	5	7	36	25	+11	41	
5	Geylang International	24	10	3	11	41	48	−7	33	
6	Home United	24	9	3	12	34	46	−12	30	
7	Warriors	24	6	5	13	40	56	−16	23	

Source: Singapore Premier League
Rules for classification: 1) points; 2) goal difference; 3) number of goals scored; 4) number of wins

=== Singapore Cup ===
Win Draw Loss

25 September 2019 Match 1	Brunei DPMM	1–1	(Singapore) Geylang International	Jalan Besar Stadium
	Andrei Varankou 90+3'		Shawal Anuar 38'	Referee: Syahir Ahmadi

19 October 2019 Match 2	Geylang International (Singapore)	0–2	(Singapore) Albirex Niigata (S)	Our Tampines Hub
			Daizo Horikoshi 81'; Daichi Tanabe 85'	Referee: Abirami Naidu

23 October 2019 Match 3	Hougang United (Singapore)	0–2	(Singapore) Geylang International	Jalan Besar Stadium
			Amy Recha 74'; Fareez Farhan 84' (pen.)	Referee: Juherman Zaiton

==== Semi-final ====
26 October 2019 SF Leg 1	Geylang International (Singapore)	0–2	(Singapore) Tampines Rovers	Our Tampines Hub
			Shahdan Sulaiman 8' (pen.); Yasir Hanapi 78'	Referee: Farhan Mohamad

30 October 2019 SF Leg 2	Tampines Rovers (Singapore)	2–1 (4–1 agg.)	(Singapore) Geylang International	Our Tampines Hub
	Yasir Hanapi 5'; Shahdan Sulaiman 85' (pen.)		Jufri Taha 74'	Referee: Nathan Chan

Tampines Rovers won 4–1 on aggregate.

==== 3rd/4th place ====
3 November 2019 3rd/4th place	Geylang International (Singapore)	2–2 (12–11 p)	(Brunei) DPMM FC	Jalan Besar Stadium
	Ifwat Ismail 75'; Fareez Farhan 85' (pen.)		Azwan Saleh 19'; Charlie Clough 90+5'	Referee: G. Letchman
	Penalties
	Barry Maguire (penalty scored); Darren Teh (penalty scored); Noor Ariff (penalty scored); Fareez Farhan (penalty scored); Harith Kanadi (penalty scored); Anders Aplin (penalty scored); Umar Akhbar (penalty scored); Yuki Ichikawa (penalty scored); Ifwat Ismail (penalty scored); Shahrin Saberin (penalty scored); Zainol Gulam (penalty scored); Barry Maguire (penalty scored)		Andrei Varankou (penalty scored); Adi Said (penalty scored); Blake Ricciuto (penalty scored); Najib Tarif (penalty scored); Azwan Ali Rahman (penalty scored); Helmi Zambin (penalty scored); Suhaimi Anak Sulau (penalty scored); Hazwan Hamzah (penalty scored); Yura Indera Putera Yunos (penalty scored); Charlie Clough (penalty scored); Haimie Anak Nyaring (penalty scored); Andrei Varankou (penalty missed)
