= 2020 Lion City Sailors FC season =

Lion City Sailors
2020 season
- Chairman: Forrest Li
- Head coach: Aurelio Vidmar
- Stadium: Bishan Stadium
- Singapore Premier League: 3rd
Home colours	Away colours

The 2020 season was Lion City Sailors' 25th consecutive season in the Singapore Premier League and the first season since privatising from Home United. Along with the Singapore Premier League, the club competed in the Singapore Cup.

== Squad ==
=== SPL squad ===
As of 5 January 2020

Squad No.	Name	Nationality	Date of birth (age)	Previous club	Contract Since	Contract End
Goalkeepers
18	Hassan Sunny ^{>30}	(Singapore)	2 April 1984 (age 42)	(Thailand) Army United F.C.	2020	2021
24	Rudy Khairullah	(Singapore)	19 July 1994 (age 32)	(Singapore) Police SA (NFL D1)	2017	2020
30	Adib Hakim ^{U23}	(Singapore)	9 March 1998 (age 28)	(Singapore) Young Lions FC	2020	2020
Defenders
2	Zulqarnaen Suzliman ^{U23}	(Singapore)	29 March 1998 (age 28)	(Singapore) Young Lions FC	2020	
3	Tajeli Salamat	(Singapore)	7 February 1994 (age 32)	(Singapore) Warriors FC	2020	
5	Kaishu Yamazaki	(Japan)	12 July 1997 (age 29)	(Singapore) Albirex Niigata (S)	2020	
6	Abdil Qaiyyim Mutalib ^{>30}	(Singapore)	14 May 1989 (age 37)	(Singapore) Tampines Rovers	2015	2020
7	Aqhari Abdullah	(Singapore)	9 July 1991 (age 35)	(Singapore) LionsXII	2016	2020
12	Iqram Rifqi	(Singapore)	25 February 1996 (age 30)	Youth Team	2017	2020
15	Faizal Roslan	(Singapore)	30 May 1995 (age 31)	(Singapore) Young Lions FC	2018	2019
19	Naqiuddin Eunos ^{U23}	(Singapore)	1 December 1997 (age 28)	(Singapore) Young Lions FC	2020	2020
22	Ho Wai Loon	(Singapore)	20 August 1993 (age 33)	(Singapore) Warriors FC	2019	2019
Midfielders
8	Shahdan Sulaiman ^{>30}	(Singapore)	9 May 1988 (age 38)	(Singapore) Tampines Rovers	2020	2021
10	Song Ui-young	(South Korea)	8 November 1993 (age 33)	Youth Team	2012	2020
13	Izzdin Shafiq (Captain)	(Singapore)	14 December 1990 (age 35)	(Singapore) Tampines Rovers	2017	2020
14	Gabriel Quak	(Singapore)	22 December 1990 (age 35)	(Singapore) Warriors FC	2020	2021
20	Arshad Shamim ^{U23}	(Singapore)	9 December 1999 (age 26)	Youth Team	2018	2019
27	Adam Swandi	(Singapore)	12 January 1996 (age 30)	(Singapore) Albirex Niigata (S)	2019	2021
28	Saifullah Akbar ^{U23}	(Singapore)	31 January 1999 (age 27)	(Singapore) Young Lions FC	2020	
Strikers
11	Hafiz Nor ^{>30}	(Singapore)	22 August 1988 (age 38)	(Singapore) Warriors FC	2018	2019
17	Shahril Ishak ^{>30}	(Singapore)	23 January 1984 (age 42)	(Singapore) Warriors FC	2018	2019
23	Amiruldin Asraf ^{U23}	(Singapore)	8 January 1997 (age 29)	Youth Team	2017	2020
25	Haiqal Pashia ^{U23}	(Singapore)	29 November 1998 (age 27)	(Singapore) Young Lions FC	2020	2020
29	Stipe Plazibat	(Croatia)	31 August 1989 (age 37)	(Singapore) Hougang United	2020	2021
Players who left during the season
9	Andy Pengelly	(Australia)	19 July 1997 (age 29)	(Australia) Brisbane Strikers FC	2020	

== Coaching staff ==
Source
Position	Name	Ref.
Chairman	(Singapore) (China) Forrest Li	
General Manager	(Singapore) Badri Ghent	
Team Manager	(Singapore) Herwandy Hamid	
Head coach	(Australia) Aurelio Vidmar	
Assistant coach	(Singapore) Noh Rahman	
Goalkeeping coach	(Singapore) Chua Lye Heng	
Academy director	(Serbia) Luka Lalić	
Head of Youth (COE)	(Singapore) Robin Chitrakar	
Video analyst	(Singapore) Adi Saleh	
Sports Trainer	(Singapore) Fazly Hasan	
Sports Performance Coach	(Singapore) Shazaly Ayob	
Physiotherapist	(Singapore) Zahir Taufeek	
Kitman		

== Transfer ==
=== Pre-season transfer ===
==== In ====
Position	Player	Transferred from	Ref
Coach	(Australia) Aurelio Vidmar	NA	
GK	(Singapore) Hassan Sunny	(Thailand) Army United F.C. (Tier 2)	2 years contract signed in 2019
GK	(Singapore) Kenji Syed Rusydi	(Singapore) Young Lions FC	Loan Return
GK	(Singapore) Adib Hakim	(Singapore) Young Lions FC	
GK	(Singapore) (Japan) Kimura Riki	(Singapore) Warriors FC	
DF	(Japan) Kaishu Yamazaki	(Singapore) Albirex Niigata (S)	Free
DF	(Singapore) Zulqarnaen Suzliman	(Singapore) Young Lions FC	
MF	(Singapore) Gabriel Quak	(Singapore) Warriors FC	2 years contract signed in 2019
MF	(Singapore) Shahdan Sulaiman	(Singapore) Tampines Rovers	Undisclosed
MF	(Singapore) Saifullah Akbar	(Singapore) Young Lions FC	
MF	(Singapore) Naqiuddin Eunos	(Singapore) Young Lions FC	
FW	(Singapore) Haiqal Pashia	(Singapore) Young Lions FC	
FW	(Australia) Andy Pengelly	(Australia) Brisbane Strikers FC (Tier 2)	Free

Note 1: Kenji Syed Rusydi returned to the team after the loan and move to Tanjong Pagar United.

==== Out ====
Position	Player	Transferred To	Ref
GK	(Singapore) Kenji Syed Rusydi	(Singapore) Tanjong Pagar United	
GK	(Singapore) Nazri Sabri	(Singapore) Project Vaults Oxley SC	
GK	(Singapore) Haikal Hasnol		
DF	(Singapore) Taufiq Muqminin		
DF	(Singapore) Faritz Abdul Hameed	(Singapore) Tanjong Pagar United F.C.	
DF	(Singapore) Juma'at Jantan	Retired	
MF	(Australia) Isaka Cernak	(Thailand) Phrae United F.C. (Tier 2)	
MF	(Singapore) Fazli Ayob		
MF	(Singapore) Suhairi Sabri	(Singapore) Tanjong Pagar United F.C.	
MF	(Singapore) Muhelmy Suhaimi		
MF	(Singapore) Hami Syahin	(Singapore) Police SA	NS till 2022
FW	(Singapore) Nur Hizami Salim		
FW	(Australia) Oliver Puflett	(Australia) Sydney Olympic FC	

==== Extension / Retained ====
Position	Player	Ref
GK	(Singapore) Rudy Khairullah	
DF	(Singapore) Abdil Qaiyyim Mutalib	
DF	(Singapore) Aqhari Abdullah	
DF	(Singapore) Faizal Roslan	
DF	(Singapore) Ho Wai Loon	
DF	(Singapore) Iqram Rifqi	
MF	(Singapore) Izzdin Shafiq	
MF	(South Korea) Song Ui-young	2 years contract signed in Oct 2018
MF	(Singapore) Hami Syahin	NS till 2022
MF	(Singapore) Adam Swandi	2 years contract signed in Dec 2019
MF	(Singapore) Arshad Shamim	
FW	(Singapore) Hafiz Nor	
FW	(Singapore) Shahril Ishak	
FW	(Singapore) Amiruldin Asraf	

==== Promoted ====
Position	Player	Ref

==== Trial ====
===== Trial (In) =====
Position	Player	Trial From	Ref

===== Trial (Out) =====
Position	Player	Trial @	Ref

=== Mid-season transfer ===
==== In ====
Position	Player	Transferred From	Ref
FW	(Croatia) Stipe Plazibat	(Singapore) Hougang United	Undisclosed; 2 years contract

==== Out ====
Position	Player	Transferred To	Ref
GK	(Singapore) Putra Anugerah	(Singapore) Young Lions FC	Season loan
FW	(Australia) Andy Pengelly	(Australia) Peninsula Power FC	Free
MF	(Singapore) (Mali) Bill Mamadou	(Singapore) Young Lions FC	Season loan

==== Loan Out ====
Position	Player	Transferred To	Ref
DF	(Singapore) Zulqarnaen Suzliman	(Singapore) Young Lions FC	NS till 2022

== Friendlies ==
=== Pre-season friendlies ===
Win Draw Loss

15 January 2020 1	Johor Darul Ta'zim F.C. (Malaysia)	4–0	(Singapore) Lion City Sailors F.C.	Johor, Malaysia
	Gonzalo Cabrera 3'; Diogo Luís Santo 12'; Syafiq Ahmad 72'; Liridon Krasniqi 83'			Stadium: Sultan Ibrahim Stadium

15 February 2020 2	Singapore Football Club	0–4	(Singapore) Lion City Sailors F.C.	Bishan Stadium
			Gabriel Quak; Shahril Ishak

18 February 2020 3	Yishun Sentek Mariners FC (Singapore)	0–10	(Singapore) Lion City Sailors F.C.	Bishan Stadium
			Shahril Ishak; Song Ui-young; Andy Pengelly; Shahdan Sulaiman; Iqram Rifqi; Hafiz Nor; Arshad Shamim

21 February 2020 4	Young Lions FC (Singapore)	2–5	(Singapore) Lion City Sailors F.C.	Bishan Stadium
	Ilhan Fandi; Marc Ryan Tan		Andy Pengelly; Iqram Rifqi; Haiqal Paisha

28 February 2020 5	Tiong Bahru FC (Singapore)	0–8	(Singapore) Lion City Sailors F.C.	Bishan Stadium
			Hafiz Nor 7'; Song Ui-young 30' 61'; Gabriel Quak 31'; Haiqal Paisha 33'; Andy Pengelly 67'; Shahril Ishak 70' 80'

25 March 2020 6	Singapore Football Club	Unknown	(Singapore) Lion City Sailors F.C.	Bishan Stadium

==== Tour of Malaysia ====
4 February 2020 Friendly	Selangor FA II (Malaysia)	6–2	(Singapore) Lion City Sailors F.C.	Selangor
	Raja Imran		Song Ui-Young; Shahril Ishak	Stadium: Selayang Stadium

8 February 2020 Friendly	Selangor (Malaysia)	3–1	(Singapore) Lion City Sailors F.C.	Selangor
	Ifedayo Olusegun			Stadium: Selayang Stadium

== Team statistics ==
=== Appearances and goals ===
As of 15 March 2019

No.	Pos.	Player	Sleague		Singapore Cup		Total	
No.	Pos.	Player	Apps.	Goals	Apps.	Goals	Apps.	Goals
3	DF	(Singapore) Tajeli Salamat	14	2	0	0	14	2
5	DF	(Japan) Kaishu Yamazaki	14	2	0	0	14	2
6	DF	(Singapore) Abdil Qaiyyim Mutalib	9	0	0	0	9	0
7	DF	(Singapore) Aqhari Abdullah	10	0	0	0	10	0
8	MF	(Singapore) Shahdan Sulaiman	13	1	0	0	13	1
10	MF	(South Korea) Song Ui-young	12	9	0	0	12	9
11	FW	(Singapore) Hafiz Nor	14	1	0	0	14	1
12	MF	(Singapore) Iqram Rifqi	1	0	0	0	1	0
13	MF	(Singapore) Izzdin Shafiq	12	0	0	0	12	0
14	MF	(Singapore) Gabriel Quak	14	5	0	0	14	5
15	DF	(Singapore) Faizal Roslan	8	0	0	0	8	0
17	FW	(Singapore) Shahril Ishak	9	3	0	0	9	3
18	GK	(Singapore) Hassan Sunny	11	0	0	0	11	0
19	MF	(Singapore) Naqiuddin Eunos	14	0	0	0	14	0
20	MF	(Singapore) Arshad Shamim	10	2	0	0	10	2
22	DF	(Singapore) Ho Wai Loon	1	0	0	0	1	0
24	GK	(Singapore) Rudy Khairullah	3	0	0	0	3	0
25	FW	(Singapore) Haiqal Pashia	9	0	0	0	9	0
27	MF	(Singapore) Adam Swandi	11	4	0	0	11	4
28	MF	(Singapore) Saifullah Akbar	11	2	0	0	11	2
29	FW	(Croatia) Stipe Plazibat	8	9	0	0	8	9
Players who have played this season but had left the club or on loan to other club
2	DF	(Singapore) Zulqarnaen Suzliman	2	0	0	0	2	0
9	FW	(Australia) Andy Pengelly	2	1	0	0	2	1

== Competitions ==
=== Overview ===
Competition	Record							
Competition	P	W	D	L	GF	GA	GD	Win %
Singapore Premier League	14	8	3	3	44	18	+26	57.14
Total	14	8	3	3	44	18	+26	57.14

=== Singapore Premier League ===
Win Draw Loss

6 March 2020 1	Tanjong Pagar United (Singapore)	1–1	(Singapore) Lion City Sailors F.C.	Jurong East Stadium
	Yann Motta 26'; Shodai Nishikawa (yellow card) 20'; Syahadat Masnawi (yellow card) 47'; Takahiro Tanaka (yellow card) 56'; Faritz Abdul Hameed (yellow card) 86'	Report	Andy Pengelly 45'; Hafiz Nor (yellow card) 59'; Kaishu Yamazaki (yellow card) 77'	Attendance: 2,723; Referee: Lim Liang Yi; Man of the Match: (Singapore) Kenji Syed Rusydi

18 March 2020 2	Tampines Rovers (Singapore)	4–0	(Singapore) Lion City Sailors F.C.	Our Tampines Hub
	Boris Kopitović 60'; Zehrudin Mehmedović 69'; Jordan Webb 78'; Shah Shahiran 82'; Daniel Bennett (yellow card) 16'	Report	Kaishu Yamazaki (yellow card) 10'; Hafiz Nor (yellow card) 77'	Attendance: 0 (Note: Due to Covid 19, this match is played behind closed door.); Referee: G. Letchman; Man of the Match: (Canada) Jordan Webb

18 October 2020 3 (Rescheduled) (Note: The match is postponed following the coronavirus pandemic.)	Lion City Sailors F.C. (Singapore)	4–0	(Singapore) Geylang International	Bishan Stadium
	Stipe Plazibat 7' 85'; Song Ui-young 45+5' (pen.); Shahril Ishak 90'; Naqiuddin Eunos (yellow card) 66'; Tajeli Salamat (yellow card) 78'	Report	Zainol Gulam (red card) 45'	Attendance: 0 Referee: Farhan Mohd; Man of the Match: (Croatia) Stipe Plazibat

24 October 2020 4 (Rescheduled)	Albirex Niigata (S) (Singapore)	3–2	(Singapore) Lion City Sailors F.C.	Jurong East Stadium
	Tomoyuki Doi 19'; Ryosuke Nagasawa 35'; Reo Nishiguchi 94'	Report	Song Ui-young 59'; Gabriel Quak 88'; Stipe Plazibat (yellow card) 90+3'; Saifullah Akbar (yellow card) 90+4'	Attendance: 0 Referee: Muhammad Taqi; Man of the Match: (Japan) Kotaro Takeda

1 November 2020 5 (Rescheduled)	Lion City Sailors F.C. (Singapore)	5–0	(Singapore) Young Lions FC	Bishan Stadium
	Adam Swandi 71'; Stipe Plazibat 76' 82' (pen.); Gabriel Quak 90+1' (yellow card) 27'; Saifullah Akbar (yellow card) 37'; Haiqal Pashia (yellow card) 41'	Report	Jacob Mahler 46' (o.g.); Shahib Masnawi (yellow card) 17'; Nur Adam Abdullah (yellow card) 32'	Attendance: 0 Referee: Jansen Foo; Man of the Match: (Singapore) Gabriel Quak

4 November 2020 6 (Rescheduled)	Lion City Sailors F.C. (Singapore)	1–1	(Singapore) Hougang United	Bishan Stadium
	Shahdan Sulaiman 60' (yellow card) 30'; Saifullah Akbar (yellow card) 67'; Tajeli Salamat (yellow card) 82'	Report	Shawal Anuar 33'; Farhan Zulkifli (yellow card) 72'; Justin Hui (yellow card) 83'; Lionel Tan (yellow card) 90+2'	Attendance: 0 Referee: Ahmad A'Qashah; Man of the Match: (Singapore) Shawal Anuar

7 November 2020 7 (Rescheduled)	Balestier Khalsa (Singapore)	1–7	(Singapore) Lion City Sailors	Bishan Stadium
	Kristijan Krajcek 63'; Faizal Raffi (yellow card) 78'	Report	Stipe Plazibat 10' 27' 31'; Song Ui-young 18'; Saifullah Akbar 33'; Tajeli Salamat 56'; Adam Swandi 65'	Attendance: 0 Referee: Juherman Zaiton; Man of the Match: (Croatia) Stipe Plazibat

13 November 2020 8 (Rescheduled)	Lion City Sailors F.C. (Singapore)	6–1	(Singapore) Tanjong Pagar United	Bishan Stadium
	Kaishu Yamazaki 14'; Stipe Plazibat 19' (pen.) 45+2'; Song Ui-young 40'; Adam Swandi 84' 90'; Tajeli Salamat (yellow card) 34'; Abdil Qaiyyim Mutalib (yellow card) 77'	Report	Suhairi Sabri 51'; Suria Prakash (yellow card) 85'	Attendance: 0 Referee: Syarqawi Buhari; Man of the Match: (Singapore) Shahdan Sulaiman

17 November 2020 9 (Rescheduled)	Hougang United (Singapore)	1–3	(Singapore) Lion City Sailors	Hougang Stadium
	Charlie Machell 90+2' (pen.); Daniel Martens (yellow card) 45'; Maksat Dzhakybaliev (yellow card) 77'; Farhan Zulkifli (yellow card) 80'	Report	Gabriel Quak 12'; Hafiz Nor 57'; Shahdan Sulaiman 87'	Attendance: 0 Referee: Lim Liang Yi; Man of the Match: (Singapore) Gabriel Quak

22 November 2020 10 (Rescheduled)	Lion City Sailors F.C. (Singapore)	2–3	(Singapore) Albirex Niigata (S)	Bishan Stadium
	Song Ui-young 22' (pen.); Tajeli Salamat 45'; Aqhari Abdullah (yellow card) 58'; Saifullah Akbar (yellow card) 78'; Shahdan Sulaiman (yellow card) 90'; Hafiz Nor (yellow card) 90+1'	Report	Tomoyuki Doi 12'; Fairoz Hasan 34'; Yasuhiro Hanada 77'; Kotaro Takeda (yellow card) 25'; Kenta Kurishima (yellow card) 73'	Attendance: 0 Referee: Farhan Mohd; Man of the Match: (Japan) Tomoyuki Doi

25 November 2020 11 (Rescheduled)	Geylang International (Singapore)	0–3	(Singapore) Lion City Sailors F.C.	Our Tampines Hub
	Harith Kanadi (yellow card) 52'	Report	Song Ui-young 71'; Gabriel Quak 86'; Kaishu Yamazaki 90+1'; Arshad Shamim (yellow card) 49'	Attendance: 0 Referee: Syarqawi Buhari; Man of the Match: (Japan) Kaishu Yamazaki

29 November 2020 12 (Rescheduled)	Young Lions FC (Singapore)	0–4	(Singapore) Lion City Sailors F.C.	Jurong West Stadium
		Report	Arshad Shamim 33' 57'; Song Ui-young 40' (pen.); Gabriel Quak 72'; Abdil Qaiyyim Mutalib (yellow card) 4'; Kaishu Yamazaki (yellow card) 12'	Attendance: 0 Referee: Lim Liang Yi; Man of the Match: (Singapore) Gabriel Quak

2 December 2020 13 (Rescheduled)	Lion City Sailors F.C. (Singapore)	1–1	(Singapore) Tampines Rovers	Bishan Stadium
	Shahril Ishak 45'; Arshad Shamim (yellow card) 19'; Song Ui-young (yellow card) 72'	Report	Zehrudin Mehmedović 63'; Amirul Adli (yellow card) 90'	Attendance: 0 Referee: Nathan Chan; Man of the Match: (Serbia) Zehrudin Mehmedović

5 December 2020 14 (Rescheduled)	Lion City Sailors F.C. (Singapore)	5–2	(Singapore) Balestier Khalsa	Bishan Stadium
	Shahril Ishak 20'; Saifullah Akbar 34'; Danish Uwais 39' (o.g.); Song Ui-young 80' 90+2'; Rudy Khairullah (yellow card) 66'	Report	Sime Zuzul 41' 88'; Ahmad Syahir (yellow card) 47'	Attendance: 0 Referee: Jansen Foo; Man of the Match: (Singapore) Hafiz Nor

Pos	Team	Pld	W	D	L	GF	GA	GD	Pts	Qualification or relegation
1	Albirex Niigata (S) (Note: The foreign club – Albirex Niigata (S) – as well as the Football Association of Singapore (FAS) under-21 team, Young Lions, are ineligible for any AFC competition spots.) (C)	14	10	2	2	32	14	+18	32	
2	Tampines Rovers	14	8	5	1	27	11	+16	29	Qualification for AFC Champions League group stage
3	Lion City Sailors	14	8	3	3	44	18	+26	27	Qualification for AFC Cup group stage
4	Geylang International	14	6	2	6	18	22	−4	20	Qualification for AFC Cup group stage
5	Balestier Khalsa	14	5	4	5	22	28	−6	19	
6	Hougang United	14	4	3	7	19	24	−5	15	
7	Young Lions	14	3	0	11	12	38	−26	9	
8	Tanjong Pagar United	14	0	5	9	14	33	−19	5	

Source: Singapore Premier League
Rules for classification: 1) points; 2) goal difference; 3) number of goals scored; 4) number of wins
(C) Champions
