= Kyoga Nakamura =

Singaporean footballer (born 1996)

- Nakamura in 2026

Personal information
- Full name: Kyoga Nakamura
- Date of birth: 25 April 1996 (age 30)
- Place of birth: Funabashi, Chiba, Japan
- Height: 1.65 m (5 ft 5 in)
- Position: Midfielder

Team information
- Current team: Lion City Sailors
- Number: 46

Youth career
- 2012–2014: JEF United Chiba

Senior career*
Years	Team	Apps	(Gls)
2015–2017	JEF United Chiba	0	(0)
2015	→ YSCC Yokohama (loan)	14	(0)
2016	→ FC Ryukyu (loan)	3	(0)
2017	→ YSCC Yokohama (loan)	22	(1)
2018	YSCC Yokohama	4	(0)
2019	Albirex Niigata (S)	23	(7)
2020–2025	Tampines Rovers	118	(14)
2025–2026	Bangkok United	9	(1)
2026–	Lion City Sailors	20	(0)

International career^{‡}
2013	Japan U17	4	(0)
2013	Japan U18	1	(0)
2024–	Singapore	28	(2)
- * Club domestic league appearances and goals as of 25 October 2026 ‡ National team caps and goals as of 1 October 2026

Kyoga Nakamura (仲村 京雅, Nakamura Kyōga; born 25 April 1996) is a professional footballer who plays as a midfielder for Singapore Premier League club Lion City Sailors. Born in Japan, he plays for the Singapore national team.

== Club career ==
=== Early career ===
Nakamura was part of JEF United Chiba academy product where he got promoted to the senior squad in 2015.

==== YSCC Yokohama (loan) ====
However, in July 2015, Nakamura was loaned out to YSCC Yokohama ahead of the 2015 J3 League season. He made his professional career debut in a 2–1 loss to FC Ryukyu on 2 August. Nakamura returned to JEF United Chiba on 31 January 2016 after his loan move contract expired.

==== FC Ryukyu (loan) ====
On 14 September 2016, Nakamura joined J3 League club FC Ryukyu on a loan deal until 31 January 2017. He made his debut for the club on 25 September against SC Sagamihara where he assisted Yuta Togashi to equalise the score at 1–1. FC Ryukyu went on to win 3–1 at the end.

=== Second stint at YSCC Yokohama ===
In February 2017, Nakamura rejoined YSCC Yokohama for his second stint on loan from JEF United Chiba. On 30 April, he scored his first professional career goal against Giravanz Kitakyushu in a 3–2 loss. At the end of the season, YSCC Yokohama decided to make the move permanent and signed Kyoga on a free transfer.

=== Albirex Niigata Singapore ===
In February 2019, Nakamura moved to Singapore to signed with Albirex Niigata (S) where he was also chosen as the club captain for the 2019 season.

Nakamura scored seven and assisted eight times during the season, including a 35-metre lob in a 3–3 draw in July against Home United, earning him a nomination for the 'Goal of the Year' accolade. He also scored back-to-back braces against Home United and Geylang International on 27 April and 5 May respectively.

Nakamura was nominated for the 'Young Player of the Year' award but lost it to Hami Syahin. Albirex Niigata (S) finished 4th in the 2019 SPL.

=== Tampines Rovers ===
Nakamura was then snapped up by Singaporean club Tampines Rovers in January 2020. He made his debut for the club during the 2020 AFC Champions League qualifying play-offs in a 5–3 lost against Indonesian club Bali United which resulted in Tampines qualifying to the 2020 AFC Cup group stage instead. Nakamura went on to play in the tournament against Indonesian club, PSM Makassar, Philippines club Kaya-Iloilo and Myanmar club Shan United before the tournament was halted by the COVID-19 pandemic. On 22 February, Nakamura won his first silverware after helping Tampines win the 2020 Singapore Community Shield in a 3–0 win over Hougang United.

On 2 May 2021, Nakamura scored a brace against Young Lions in a 7–0 thrashing league win. Nakamura was also involved in the club all six fixtures during the 2021 AFC Champions League group stage matches against Japan's Gamba Osaka, Korea's Jeonbuk Hyundai Motors and Thailand's Chiangrai United. In January 2022, Nakamura was handed a new five-year deal by the Stags in an unprecedented move in Singaporean football, making it the longest contract extension in Singaporean league history. Kyoga had turned down offers from clubs in Japan, Indonesia and Thailand before reaffirming his commitment to the club. On 18 March 2022, he recorded an hat-trick of assists as Tampines Rovers thrash Hougang United 7–1.

=== Bangkok United ===
On 29 June 2025, it was announced that Kyoga would be joining Thai League 1 club Bangkok United on a one-year contract leaving Tampines Rovers after 158 appearances in all competition in his five years stint with the club. He make his debut for the club in the 2025–26 AFC Champions League Elite qualifying play-offs against Chinese club Chengdu Rongcheng on 12 August 2025. Kyoga then scored his first goal for the club in a league match against PT Prachuap on 22 November 2025 scoring a banger with his weak foot from outside the box which the match ended in a 4–1 win for Bangkok United.

=== Lion City Sailors ===
On 8 January 2026, Kyoga returned to Singapore to sign with Lion City Sailors on a two and a half year contract, which runs until the end of the 2027–28 season after terminating his contract with Bangkok United.

== International career ==
Nakamura playing for Singapore in 2026

In October 2013, Nakamura was selected for the Japan U17 national team for the 2013 U-17 World Cup in UAE. He played three matches including the Round of 16 match against Sweden U17.

On 2 September 2024, Nakamura was called up to the Singapore national team centralised training camp for a familiarisation stint prior to gaining Singapore citizenship. On 6 November 2024, he received his first official call up as a Singapore citizen. He made his debut for Singapore in their 3–2 international friendly victory against Myanmar on 15 November 2024, also earning a Man of the Match award for his performance.

Nakamura scored his first international goal on 14 December 2024 against East Timor at the Hàng Đẫy Stadium during the 2024 ASEAN Championship.

== Personal life ==
Nakamura was born in Funabashi. He moved to Singapore in 2019, becoming a permanent resident (PR) in 2024, and subsequently a Singaporean citizen later on 25 October 2024. As both Japan and Singapore do not permit multiple citizenships in adulthood, Nakamura had relinquished his Japanese citizenship in the process.

== Career statistics ==
=== Club ===
As of match played 17 May 2026

Club	Season	League			National cup (Note: Includes Emperor's Cup, Singapore Cup, Thai FA Cup)		League cup (Note: Includes J.League Cup, Thai League Cup)		Continental		Other		Total	
Club	Season	Division	Apps	Goals	Apps	Goals	Apps	Goals	Apps	Goals	Apps	Goals	Apps	Goals
JEF United Chiba	2015	J2 League	0	0	0	0	0	0	0	0	0	0	0	0
JEF United Chiba	2016	J2 League	0	0	0	0	0	0	0	0	0	0	0	0
JEF United Chiba	2017	J2 League	0	0	0	0	0	0	0	0	0	0	0	0
JEF United Chiba	Total		0	0	0	0	0	0	0	0	0	0	0	0
YSCC Yokohama (loan)	2015	J3 League	14	0	0	0	0	0	0	0	0	0	14	0
FC Ryukyu (loan)	2016	J3 League	3	0	0	0	0	0	0	0	0	0	3	0
YSCC Yokohama (loan)	2017	J3 League	22	1	1	0	0	0	0	0	0	0	23	1
YSCC Yokohama	2018	J3 League	4	0	0	0	0	0	0	0	0	0	4	0
Albirex Niigata (S)	2019	Singapore Premier League	23	7	3	0	0	0	0	0	1 (Note: Appearance in Singapore Community Shield)	0	27	7
Tampines Rovers	2020	Singapore Premier League	14	0	0	0	1	0	4 (Note: One appearance in AFC Champions League, three appearances in AFC Cup)	0	1	0	20	0
Tampines Rovers	2021	Singapore Premier League	21	3	0	0	0	0	6 (Note: Appearances in AFC Champions League)	0	0	0	27	3
Tampines Rovers	2022	Singapore Premier League	28	5	6	2	0	0	2 (Note: Appearance(s) in AFC Cup)	0	0	0	36	7
Tampines Rovers	2023	Singapore Premier League	23	3	7	0	0	0	1	0	0	0	31	3
Tampines Rovers	2024–25	Singapore Premier League	32	3	7	0	0	0	6 (Note: Appearances in AFC Champions League Two)	0	0	0	45	3
Tampines Rovers	Total		118	14	20	2	1	0	19	0	1	0	159	16
Bangkok United	2025–26	Thai League 1	9	1	0	0	0	0	5 (Note: One appearance in AFC Champions League Elite, four appearances in AFC Champions League Two)	0	3 (Note: Appearances in ASEAN Club Championship)	0	17	1
Lion City Sailors	2025–26	Singapore Premier League	16	0	1	0	0	0	0	0	0	0	17	0
Lion City Sailors	2026–27	Singapore Premier League	0	0	0	0	0	0	0	0	0	0	0	0
Lion City Sailors	Total		16	0	1	0	0	0	0	0	0	0	17	0
Career total			209	23	25	2	1	0	24	0	5	0	264	25

=== International ===
As of match played 10 June 2025

Appearances and goals by national team and year
National team	Year	Apps	Goals
Singapore	2024	7	2
Singapore	2025	4	0
Total		11	2

==== Japan U17 international caps ====
No	Date	Venue	Opponent	Result	Competition
1	21 October 2013	Sharjah Stadium, UAE	Venezuela	2–1 (won)	2013 FIFA U-17 World Cup
2	24 October 2013	Sharjah Stadium, UAE	Tunisia	2–1 (won)	2013 FIFA U-17 World Cup
3	28 October 2013	Sharjah Stadium, UAE	Sweden	1–2 (lost)	2013 FIFA U-17 World Cup

=== International goals ===
#	Date	Venue	Opponent	Score	Result	Competition
1.	14 December 2024	Hàng Đẫy Stadium, Hanoi, Vietnam	Timor-Leste	1–0	3–0	2024 ASEAN Championship
2.	29 December 2024	Việt Trì Stadium, Việt Trì, Vietnam	Vietnam	1–2	1–3	2024 ASEAN Championship

== Honours ==
=== Club ===
Tampines Rovers

- Singapore Community Shield: 2020

Lion City Sailors

- Singapore Cup: 2025-26

=== Individual ===
- Singapore Premier League Team of the Year: 2019, 2020, 2022, 2023
- ASEAN Championship Best XI: 2024
