= Gilson Varela =

Cape Verdean footballer

Personal information
- Full name: Gilson Monteiro Varela da Silva
- Date of birth: 12 May 1990 (age 36)
- Place of birth: Praia, Cape Verde
- Height: 1.90 m (6 ft 3 in)
- Position: Forward

Team information
- Current team: União Santarém
- Number: 45

Senior career*
Years	Team	Apps	(Gls)
2011–2012	Tyde		
2012–2013	Vianense	23	(1)
2013	Águias do Moradal	0	(0)
2014	Vitória de Sernache	19	(10)
2014–2015	União de Montemor	18	(6)
2015	Casa Pia	14	(4)
2015	Oriental	8	(0)
2016	Casa Pia	10	(0)
2016–2017	Benfica e Castelo Branco	10	(1)
2017	Pinhalnovense	12	(2)
2017–2018	Espinho	26	(9)
2018–2019	Etar	8	(0)
2019–2020	Benfica e Castelo Branco	6	(1)
2020	Geylang International	0	(0)
2020	SC São João de Ver	4	(0)
2021–	União Santarém	1	(0)

International career
2018–	Cape Verde	1	(0)
- * Club domestic league appearances and goals as of 19:22, 26 January 2021 (UTC)

Gilson Monteiro Varela da Silva, known as Gilson (born 12 May 1990) is a Cape Verdean football player who plays for União Santarém.

== Club career ==
He made his professional debut in the Segunda Liga for Oriental on 15 August 2015 in a game against Vitória Guimarães B.

On 11 July 2018, Varela signed with Bulgarian club Etar.

== Career statistics ==
=== Club ===
As of 2 Nov 2019.

Club	Season	League			FA Cup		League Cup		Continental		Total	
Club	Season	Division	Apps	Goals	Apps	Goals	Apps	Goals	Apps	Goals	Apps	Goals
Águias do Moradal	2013–14	Campeonato de Portugal	0	0	0	0	0	0	0	0	0	0
Águias do Moradal	Total		0	0	0	0	0	0	0	0	0	0
Vitória de Sernache	2013–14	Campeonato de Portugal	19	10	0	0	0	0	0	0	19	10
Vitória de Sernache	Total		19	10	0	0	0	0	0	0	19	10
União de Montemor	2014–15	Campeonato de Portugal	18	6	0	0	0	0	0	0	18	6
União de Montemor	Total		18	6	0	0	0	0	0	0	18	6
Casa Pia A.C.	2014–15	Campeonato de Portugal	14	4	0	0	0	0	0	0	14	4
Casa Pia A.C.	Total		14	4	0	0	0	0	0	0	14	4
Clube Oriental de Lisboa	2015–16	LigaPro	8	0	1	0	0	0	0	0	9	0
Clube Oriental de Lisboa	Total		8	0	1	0	0	0	0	0	9	0
Casa Pia A.C.	2015–16	Campeonato de Portugal	10	0	1	1	0	0	0	0	11	1
Casa Pia A.C.	Total		10	1	1	0	0	0	0	0	11	1
Sport Benfica e Castelo Branco	2016–17	Campeonato de Portugal	10	1	1	0	0	0	0	0	11	1
Sport Benfica e Castelo Branco	Total		10	1	1	0	0	0	0	0	11	1
C.D. Pinhalnovense	2016–17	Campeonato de Portugal	12	2	0	0	0	0	0	0	12	2
C.D. Pinhalnovense	Total		12	2	0	0	0	0	0	0	12	2
S.C. Espinho	2017–18	Campeonato de Portugal	26	9	0	0	0	0	0	0	26	9
S.C. Espinho	Total		26	9	0	0	0	0	0	0	26	9
Club	Season	League			FA Cup		League Cup		Continental		Total	
Club	Season	Division	Apps	Goals	Apps	Goals	Apps	Goals	Apps	Goals	Apps	Goals
SFC Etar Veliko Tarnovo	2018–19	First Professional Football League	8	0	2	0	0	0	0	0	10	0
SFC Etar Veliko Tarnovo	Total		8	0	2	0	0	0	0	0	10	0
Club	Season	League			FA Cup		League Cup		Continental		Total	
Club	Season	Division	Apps	Goals	Apps	Goals	Apps	Goals	Apps	Goals	Apps	Goals
Sport Benfica e Castelo Branco	2019–20	Campeonato de Portugal	6	1	0	0	0	0	0	0	6	1
Sport Benfica e Castelo Branco	Total		6	1	0	0	0	0	0	0	6	1
Club	Season	League			Singapore Cup		League Cup		AFC Cup		Total	
Club	Season	Division	Apps	Goals	Apps	Goals	Apps	Goals	Apps	Goals	Apps	Goals
Geylang International	2020	Singapore Premier League	0	0	0	0	0	0	0	0	0	0
Geylang International	Total		0	0	0	0	0	0	0	0	0	0
Career total			28	7	6	2	0	0	6	2	40	11

== International career ==
Varela made his debut for the Cape Verde national football team in a 2-0 2019 Africa Cup of Nations qualification loss to Tanzania on 16 October 2018.
