= Kamolidin Tashiyev =

Kyrgyzstani footballer

Personal information
- Full name: Kamolidin Nazhimidinovich Tashiyev
- Date of birth: 9 February 2000 (age 26)
- Place of birth: Jalal-Abad, Kyrgyzstan
- Height: 1.80 m (5 ft 11 in)
- Position: Defender

Team information
- Current team: Abdysh-Ata Kant

Youth career
- –2019: Abdysh-Ata Kant

Senior career*
Years	Team	Apps	(Gls)
2020	Geylang International	5	(0)
2021–	Abdysh-Ata Kant		
- * Club domestic league appearances and goals as of 19:58, 23 March 2021 (UTC)

Kamolidin Nazhimidinovich Tashiyev (Kyrgyz: Камолидин Ташиев; Russian: Камолидин Нажимидинович Ташиев; born 9 February 2000) is a Kyrgyzstani footballer who currently plays for Abdysh-Ata Kant.

== Career statistics ==
=== Club ===
As of match played 22 Mar 2025.

Club	Season	League			National Cup		Other		Total	
Club	Season	Division	Apps	Goals	Apps	Goals	Apps	Goals	Apps	Goals
Geylang International	2020	Singapore Premier League	5	0	0	0	0	0	5	0
FC Abdysh-Ata Kant	2021	Kyrgyz Premier League	15	2	0	0	0	0	15	2
FC Abdysh-Ata Kant	2022	Kyrgyz Premier League	17	2	0	0	0	0	17	2
Talant Besh-Küngöy	2023	Kyrgyz Premier League	3	0	0	0	0	0	3	0
Talant Besh-Küngöy	2024	Kyrgyz Premier League	4	0	0	0	0	0	4	0
FC Alga Bishkek	2024	Kyrgyz Premier League	9	0	0	0	0	0	9	0
FC Dordoi Bishkek	2025	Kyrgyz Premier League	0	0	0	0	0	0	0	0
Career total			5	0	0	0	0	0	5	0
