= Panagiotis Linardos =

Greek footballer

Personal information
- Date of birth: 7 August 1991 (age 35)
- Place of birth: Messolonghi, Greece
- Height: 1.79 m (5 ft 10 in)
- Position: Midfielder

Youth career
- –2009: Messolonghi
- 2009–2010: Apollon Limassol

Senior career*
| Years | Team | Apps | (Gls) |
| 2010–2011 | Parekklisia | 0 | (0) |
| 2012–2013 | AEZ Zakakiou | 22 | (10) |
| 2013–2014 | Anorthosis | 0 | (0) |
| 2013–2014 | → Anagennisi Deryneia (loan) | 25 | (9) |
| 2014–2015 | Omonia Aradippou | 26 | (6) |
| 2015–2016 | Panegialios | 25 | (4) |
| 2016–2017 | Veria | 16 | (3) |
| 2017–2018 | Lamia | 5 | (0) |
| 2018–2019 | Kerkyra | 21 | (2) |
| 2019 | Panachaiki | 10 | (1) |
| 2020 | Geylang International | 2 | (0) |
| 2020–2021 | Diagoras | 24 | (2) |
| 2021–2022 | Levadiakos | 16 | (2) |
| 2022–2023 | Panachaiki | 19 | (4) |
| 2023–2024 | Ionikos | 17 | (0) |
- * Club domestic league appearances and goals as of 15 May 2024

Panagiotis Linardos (Greek: Παναγιώτης Λινάρδος; born 7 August 1991) is a Greek former professional footballer who played as a midfielder.

== Career ==
Linardos started his football career in amateur football leagues of Aetoloacarnania Football Clubs Association playing for the local team of his hometown AE Mesolongi.

=== Move to Cyprus ===
He later moved on to Cyprus to become a professional football player as he played for several teams including Apollon Limassol and Anorthosis who played both were part of the Cypriot First Division.

=== Panegialios ===
In the summer of '15 he returned to Greece as he signed a contract with Panegialios. In Panegialios F.C., Linardos played in twenty five games and netted four times.

=== Veria ===
His performances in Football League led Veria to sign him on 20 July 2016 on a free transfer.

=== AEK Kerkyra ===
On 15 September 2018, he signed a one-year contract with Kerkyra on a free transfer.

=== Panachaiki ===
Linardos made 12 appearances in all competitions, including 10 in the Super League Greece 2, in the 2019–20 Superleague Greece 2 season before terminating his contract to move to Singapore.

=== Geylang International ===
Linardos signed for Singapore Premier League side Geylang International FC for the 2020 Singapore Premier League season. He terminated his contract with Panachaiki F.C. because he received a lucrative offer of more than €70,000 a year, from the Eagles.

== Honours ==
Levadiakos

- Super League 2: 2021–22
