= Umar Ramle =

Singaporean footballer

Personal information
- Full name: Umar Akhbar bin Ramle
- Date of birth: 2 May 1996 (age 30)
- Place of birth: Singapore
- Height: 1.64 m (5 ft 5 in)
- Position: Midfielder

Team information
- Current team: Tanjong Pagar United
- Number: 14

Senior career*
Years	Team	Apps	(Gls)
2016–2022	Geylang International	64	(1)
2023	Hougang United	4	(0)
2024–	Tanjong Pagar United	4	(0)
- * Club domestic league appearances and goals as of 3 February 2021

Umar Akhbar bin Ramle (born 2 May 1996), also known as just Umar, is a Singaporean professional footballer who plays as a central-midfielder or defensive-midfielder for Singapore Premier League club Tanjong Pagar United.

== Career statistics ==
=== Club ===
As of 25 May 2025

Club	Season	League			FA Cup		League Cup		Continental		Total	
Club	Season	Division	Apps	Goals	Apps	Goals	Apps	Goals	Apps	Goals	Apps	Goals
Geylang International	2016	S.League	0	0	0	0	5	0	0	0	5	0
Geylang International	2017	S.League	0	0	0	0	0	0	0	0	0	0
Geylang International	2018	Singapore Premier League	3	0	0	0	0	0	0	0	3	0
Geylang International	2019	Singapore Premier League	16	0	6	0	0	0	0	0	22	0
Geylang International	2020	Singapore Premier League	8	0	0	0	0	0	0	0	8	0
Geylang International	2021	Singapore Premier League	6	0	0	0	0	0	0	0	6	0
Geylang International	2022	Singapore Premier League	17	1	3	0	0	0	0	0	29	1
Geylang International	Total		50	1	9	0	5	0	0	0	64	1
Hougang United	2023	Singapore Premier League	4	0	0	0	0	0	0	0	4	0
Hougang United	Total		4	0	0	0	0	0	0	0	4	0
Tanjong Pagar United	2024–25	Singapore Premier League	4	0	0	0	0	0	0	0	4	0
Tanjong Pagar United	Total		4	0	0	0	0	0	0	0	4	0
Career total			58	1	9	0	5	0	0	0	72	1

== Honours ==
=== Hougang United ===
- Singapore Cup Runner-ups (1): 2023
