= Ryosuke Nagasawa =

Japanese footballer

Personal information
- Date of birth: 25 September 1998 (age 28)
- Place of birth: Osaka, Japan
- Height: 1.62 m (5 ft 4 in)
- Position: Forward

Team information
- Current team: North Bangkok University
- Number: 44

Youth career
- Nishinagao FC
- 2011–2013: Gamba Osaka
- 2014–2017: Vissel Kobe

Senior career*
Years	Team	Apps	(Gls)
2018–2019	Phuket City		
2020–2021	Albirex Niigata Singapore	28	(5)
2022	Radnički Niš	0	(0)
2023–2024	Kasetsart	31	(4)
2025	Nakhon Si United	11	(0)
2026–	North Bangkok University	0	(0)

International career^{‡}
2014	Japan U16	3	(1)
2015	Japan U17	4	(2)
- * Club domestic league appearances and goals as of 10:40, 11 January 2026 (UTC) ‡ National team caps and goals as of 9:30, 29 February 2020 (UTC)

Ryosuke Nagasawa (永澤 竜亮, Nagasawa Ryosuke; born 25 September 1998) is a Japanese professional footballer for Thai League 3 club North Bangkok University.

== Career statistics ==
=== Club ===
As of 11 January 2022.

Club	Season	League			Cup		Others		Total	
Club	Season	Division	Apps	Goals	Apps	Goals	Apps	Goals	Apps	Goals
Albirex Niigata Singapore	2020	Singapore Premier League	14	3	0	0	0	0	14	3
Albirex Niigata Singapore	2021	Singapore Premier League	14	2	0	0	0	0	14	2
Albirex Niigata Singapore	Total		28	5	0	0	0	0	28	5
Radnički Niš	2021–22	Serbian SuperLiga	0	0	0	0	0	0	0	0
Radnički Niš	Total		0	0	0	0	0	0	0	0
Persikabo 1973	2022–23	Liga 1 (Indonesia)	0	0	0	0	0	0	0	0
Persikabo 1973	Total		0	0	0	0	0	0	0	0
Kasetsart F.C.	2023–24	Thai League 2	0	0	0	0	0	0	0	0
Kasetsart F.C.	Total		0	0	0	0	0	0	0	0
Career total			28	5	0	0	0	0	28	5
