= Barry Maguire (footballer, born 1989) =

Dutch professional footballer (born 1989)

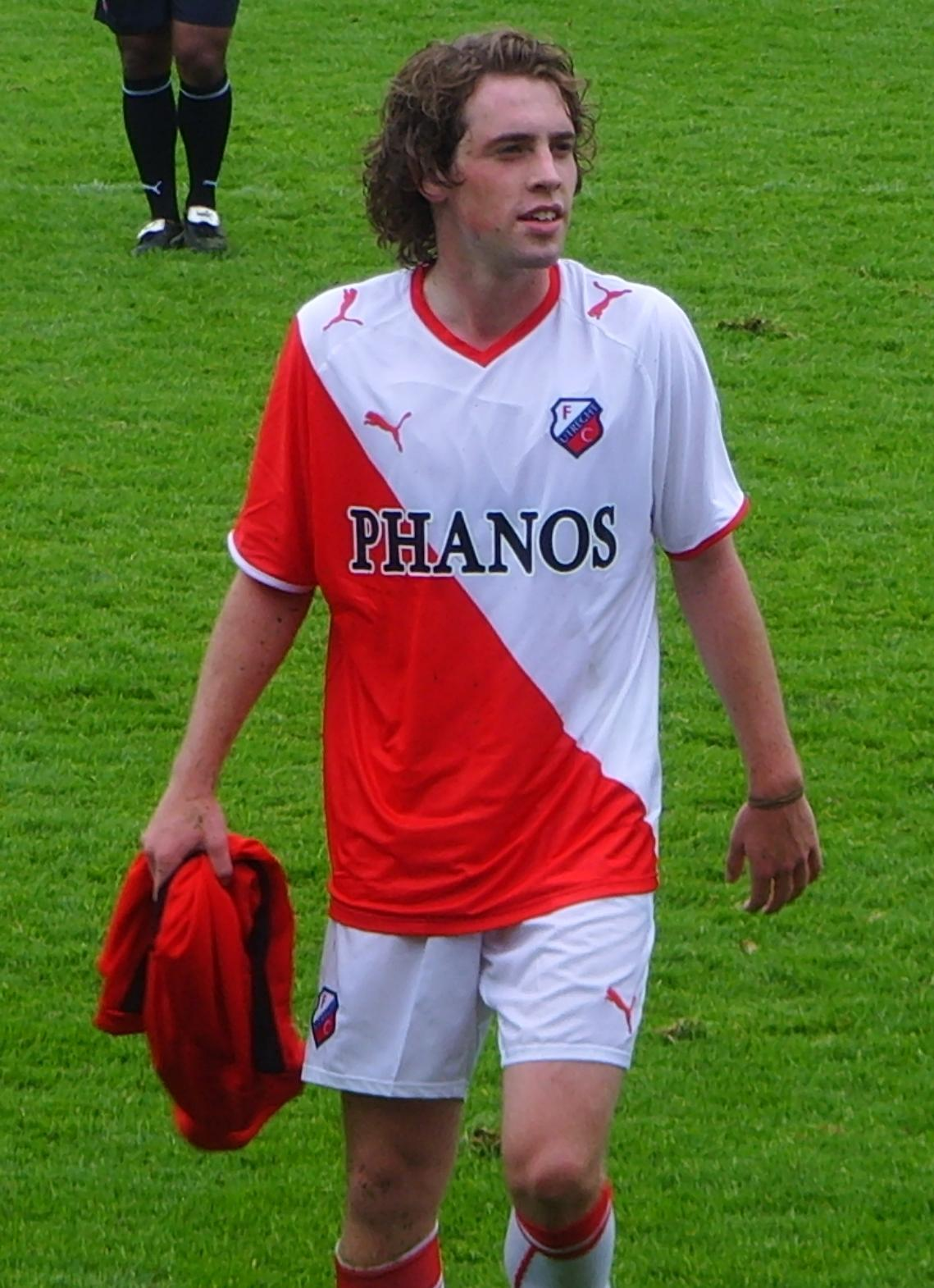
- Maguire at training with Utrecht in the 2007–08 season

Personal information
- Date of birth: 27 October 1989 (age 37)
- Place of birth: Tiel, Netherlands
- Height: 1.80 m (5 ft 11 in)
- Positions: Defensive midfielder; centre-back

Team information
- Current team: GVVV
- Number: 8

Youth career
- Theole
- –2006: Den Bosch

Senior career*
Years	Team	Apps	(Gls)
2006–2008	Den Bosch	66	(6)
2008–2011	Utrecht	50	(0)
2011–2013	VVV-Venlo	46	(6)
2013–2015	Den Bosch	66	(9)
2015–2017	Sarpsborg 08	3	(1)
2017–2018	TEC	13	(6)
2018	Limerick	25	(4)
2019–2021	Geylang International	50	(8)
2022	Den Bosch	14	(0)
2022–	GVVV	63	(3)

International career
2005	Republic of Ireland U16	1	(0)
2007	Netherlands U18	2	(0)
2007–2008	Netherlands U19	9	(2)
2008–2009	Netherlands U20	4	(0)
- * Club domestic league appearances and goals as of 13:59, 10 May 2024 (UTC)

Barry Maguire (born 27 October 1989) is a Dutch professional footballer who plays as a defensive midfielder for Tweede Divisie club GVVV.

== Youth career ==
Maguire started to play football at amateur club Theole, in his native town of Tiel. Here he was scouted by FC Den Bosch.

== Club career ==
=== FC Den Bosch ===
At the age of 16, he joined FC Den Bosch's first squad.

=== Utrecht ===
Maguire moved on to FC Utrecht in 2008. He scored Utrecht's fourth goal in their 4–0 win over Celtic in their Europa League play-off win in August 2010.

The development of a long-lasting injury to his back which also affected his left calf muscle caused Maguire to miss games and eventually have to move to less challenging leagues, in the hope of regaining his fitness.

=== Sarpsborg 08 FF ===
He joined Norwegian team Sarpsborg 08 FF in the summer of 2015.

=== TEC ===
Maguire moved to TEC in January 2017, after troubles with injuries and the expiration of his contract with Sarpsborg 08 FF. In the summer he was unable to agree a contract extension and left the club.

=== Limerick ===
Maguire moved from local club TEC to Limerick in February 2018. During his time at the club, which was struggling to avoid relegation for most of the season, he became one of the team's highest scorers, with most of his goals coming from late runs into the box. He scored three goals but failed to save his team from relegation.

=== Geylang International ===
In January 2019 it was announced that Maguire had joined Singapore Premier League club Geylang International. He won the 2020 Singapore Premier League Goal of the Year award a goal in a 2–1 win over the Young Lions in August.

=== Return to Den Bosch ===
After his contract with Geylang International expired Maguire trained with former club FC Den Bosch for three weeks. He subsequently agreed a contract until the end of the season in January 2022.

== International career ==
Maguire represented the Republic of Ireland Under-16 and the Netherlands Under-19 teams, since his father is Irish, Maguire can still represent either the Netherlands and the Republic of Ireland at senior competitive level.

On 27 January 2009, Barry Maguire was called up to the Republic of Ireland Under 21 squad for the first time, but he rejected the invitation the following day. In September 2010 he declared himself eager to represent Ireland.

== Career statistics ==
=== Club ===
As of match played 4 May 2024

Appearances and goals by club, season and competition
Club	Season	League			National cup		League cup		Continental		Other		Total		Ref.
Club	Season	Division	Apps	Goals	Apps	Goals	Apps	Goals	Apps	Goals	Apps	Goals	Apps	Goals	Ref.
FC Den Bosch	2006–07	Eerste Divisie	29	2	0	0	—		—		3	0	32	2	
FC Den Bosch	2007–08	Eerste Divisie	37	4	3	0	—		—		3	0	43	4	
FC Den Bosch	Total		66	6	3	0	—		—		6	0	75	6	–
Utrecht	2008–09	Eredivisie	27	0	1	0	—		0	0	1	0	29	0	
Utrecht	2009–10	Eredivisie	7	0	0	0	—		0	0	4	0	11	0	
Utrecht	2010–11	Eredivisie	16	0	2	1	—		9	1	—		27	2	
Utrecht	Total		50	0	2	1	0	0	9	1	5	0	66	2	–
VVV-Venlo	2011–12	Eredivisie	23	4	1	0	—		—		4	0	28	4	
VVV-Venlo	2012–13	Eerste Divisie	22	2	0	0	—		—		1	0	23	2	
VVV-Venlo	2013–14	Eerste Divisie	1	0	0	0	—		—		—		1	0	
VVV-Venlo	Total		46	6	1	0	—		—		5	0	52	6	–
FC Den Bosch	2013–14	Eerste Divisie	32	3	1	0	—		—		2	0	35	3	
FC Den Bosch	2014–15	Eerste Divisie	34	6	1	0	—		—		—		35	6	
FC Den Bosch	Total		66	9	2	0	—		—		2	0	70	9	–
Sarpsborg 08	2015	Tippeligaen	3	1	1	0	—		—		—		4	1	
SV TEC	2016–17	Derde Divisie	13	6	0	0	—		—		—		13	6	
Limerick	2018	League of Ireland Premier Division	25	4	1	2	1	0	—		2	0	29	6	
Geylang International	2019	Singapore Premier League	21	5	6	0	0	0	0	0	–		27	5	
Geylang International	2020	Singapore Premier League	13	3	0	0	0	0	0	0	–		13	3	
Geylang International	2021	Singapore Premier League	16	0	0	0	0	0	0	0	0	0	16	0	
Geylang International	Total		50	8	6	0	0	0	0	0	0	0	56	8	–
FC Den Bosch	2021–22	Eerste Divisie	14	0	0	0	—		—		—		14	0	
GVVV	2022–23	Derde Divisie	32	1	2	0	—		—		6	0	40	1	
GVVV	2023–24	Tweede Divisie	31	2	3	0	—		—		—		34	2	
GVVV	Total		63	3	5	0	—		—		6	0	74	3	–
Career total			396	43	21	3	1	0	9	1	26	0	453	47	–
