= Matthew Palmer (footballer) =

New Zealand footballer (born 2000)

Personal information
- Full name: Matthew Ray Palmer
- Date of birth: 16 February 2000 (age 26)
- Position: Forward

Team information
- Current team: Eastern Suburbs
- Number: 18

Youth career
- –2017: Eastern Suburbs
- 2019: Vejle Boldklub

Senior career*
Years	Team	Apps	(Gls)
2017–2018	Eastern Suburbs	9	(1)
2019	Geylang International	6	(0)
2020–	Eastern Suburbs	1	(0)

International career^{‡}
2017	New Zealand U17	7	(4)
- * Club domestic league appearances and goals as of 00:14, 19 January 2020 (UTC) ‡ National team caps and goals as of 17:14, 27 July 2019 (UTC)

Matthew Ray Palmer (born 16 February 2000) is a New Zealand footballer who currently plays for Eastern Suburbs as a forward.

== Career statistics ==
=== Club ===
As of 1 January 2020.

Club	Season	League			Cup		Continental		Other		Total	
Club	Season	Division	Apps	Goals	Apps	Goals	Apps	Goals	Apps	Goals	Apps	Goals
Eastern Suburbs	2016–17	ISPS Handa Premiership	1	0	0	0	–		0	0	1	0
Eastern Suburbs	2017–18	ISPS Handa Premiership	8	1	0	0	–		0	0	8	1
Eastern Suburbs	Total		9	1	0	0	0	0	0	0	9	1
Geylang International	2019	Singapore Premier League	6	0	5 (Note: Appearances in the Singapore Cup)	0	–		0	0	11	0
Career total			15	1	5	0	0	0	0	0	20	1
