= Zainol Gulam =

Singaporean association football player

Personal information
- Full name: Muhammad Zainol Bin Gulam Mohamed
- Date of birth: 4 February 1992 (age 34)
- Place of birth: Singapore
- Position: Goalkeeper

Team information
- Current team: Albirex Niigata (S)
- Number: 25

Youth career
- 2008: Sengkang Punggol
- 2010: Geylang International
- 2011–2013: Warriors FC
- 2014: Woodlands Wellington

Senior career*
Years	Team	Apps	(Gls)
2015	Singapore Recreational Club		
2016–2017	Warriors FC	9	(0)
2018–2021	Geylang International	43	(0)
2022–2023	Hougang United	4	(0)
2024–	Albirex Niigata (S)	0	(0)
- * Club domestic league appearances and goals as of 6 February 2023 (UTC)

Zainol Gulam is a Singaporean professional footballer who plays as a goalkeeper for Singapore Premier League club Albirex Niigata (S).

== Club career ==
=== Warriors FC ===
Zainol was part of Warriors FC's squad in 2016 and came on as a substitute after fellow custodian Yazid Yasin was sent off during a match against Tampines Rovers. Zainol was handed a start against Brunei DPMM for the following match and displayed a great performance as he held his opponents to a 1–1 draw.

At the end of the 2017 season, Zainol was released from the club and contemplated retirement to sign on in the civil force.

=== Geylang International ===
==== 2018 season ====
Geylang International signed Zainol for the 2018 season behind Jasper Chan. After Chan suffered an injury within his first few games. Zainol was given the nod in goal and started in Geylang's 17 league matches.

During a league match against his former club, the Warriors, at the Singapore National Stadium, Zainol made a string of saves to keep his former side at bay in a 2–0 victory, gaining him the nickname "King of Kallang".

==== 2019 season ====
In the 2019 Singapore Cup 3rd place play-offs against Brunei DPMM, Zainol made the winning save in the penalty shootout to help the Eagles clinch third place.

==== 2020 season ====
During a league match against Lion City Sailors on 18 October 2020, Zainol was sent off after performing a reckless tackle on Arshad Shamim, conceding a penalty at the same time which back-up goalkeeper Hairul Syirhan could not keep out.

Zainol, along with Geylang International, qualified for the 2021 AFC Cup group stage which was promptly cancelled in the following season.

==== 2021 season ====
Zainol started in goal against Lion City Sailors on 11 April 2021 at Our Tampines Hub in an 8–0 defeat to the hands of the visitors.

Zainol started only 6 out of Geylang's 14 matches at the time and declared retirement from professional football on 17 August 2021 due to the logistics behind professionalism in Singapore football. Zainol citing that football wasn't a secured job for him due to contract negotiations and decided to sign on with the Singapore Civil Defence Force. Zainol was also one out of five goalkeepers Geylang deployed in their entire league campaign.

=== Hougang United ===
==== Return from retirement ====
During the 2022 Singapore Premier League season, Zainol was found wearing Hougang United's tees in the stands over the course of the season.

On 18 June 2022, Hougang United announced that Zainol had come back from retirement and signed for the Cheetahs. He was a used substitute in their 8–0 defeat against Johor Darul Ta'zim in a friendly. Zainol made his return to the league on 15 October 2022 against the Young Lions, winning 5–3. He ended his league campaign with a clean sheet against Balestier Khalsa before being substituted on for Aizil Yazid in the 81st minute.

Zainol started in all but one game in Hougang's Singapore Cup run, helping the Cheetahs to their first ever silverware.

==== 2023 season ====
Following the arrival of Zaiful Nizam from Geylang International, Zainol was yet again relegated back to the bench but still made appearances for the club's Under-21 Center of Excellence squad. He would then make his first start of the season against Balestier Khalsa in the second round after Zaiful suffered an injury. Zainol produced seven saves in a 3–1 loss, playing a near perfect game as he stopped several shots from close range. He made his second consecutive start of the season in a 1–0 loss against Tampines Rovers.

=== Albirex Niigata Singapore ===
On 3 January 2024, Albirex Niigata Singapore announced that he has signed with the club and will serve as a back up goalkeeper to his former Warriors teammate, Hassan Sunny.

== International career ==
Zainol was called up for training by the Singapore national team in 2019 but never made a single appearance for the Lions.

== Career statistics ==
Update 23 May 2021

Club	Season	S.League		Singapore Cup		Singapore League Cup		Asia		Total	
Club	Season	Apps	Goals	Apps	Goals	Apps	Goals	Apps	Goals	Apps	Goals
Singapore Recreation Club	2015	0	0	0	0	3	0	0	0	3	0
Singapore Recreation Club	Total	0	0	0	0	3	0	0	0	3	0
Warriors FC	2017	6	0	0	0	0	0	0	0	6	0
Warriors FC	Total	6	0	0	0	0	0	0	0	6	0
Geylang International	2018	17	0	2	0	0	0	0	0	19	0
Geylang International	2019	15	0	6	0	0	0	0	0	16	0
Geylang International	2020	4	0	0	0	0	0	0	0	4	0
Geylang International	2021	7	0	0	0	0	0	0	0	7	0
Geylang International	Total	43	0	8	0	0	0	0	0	46	0

== Honours ==
=== Club ===
Hougang United

- Singapore Cup: 2022
