= Kaishu Yamazaki =

Japanese footballer

Personal information
- Full name: Kaishu Yamazaki
- Date of birth: 12 July 1997 (age 29)
- Place of birth: Chiba, Japan
- Height: 1.82 m (6 ft 0 in)
- Position: Defensive midfielder

Team information
- Current team: Kuching City

Youth career
- 2007–2015: Kashiwa Reysol
- 2016: Darmstadt 98

Senior career*
Years	Team	Apps	(Gls)
2016–2017	Iwaki FC	0	(0)
2018–2019	Albirex Niigata (S)	39	(3)
2020–2021	Lion City Sailors	13	(2)
2021–2023	Hougang United	39	(4)
2023	Mosta	6	(0)
2023	Persikabo 1973	17	(0)
2024–2026	Kaya–Iloilo	42	(6)
2026–	Kuching City	0	(0)
- * Club domestic league appearances and goals as of 4 July 2026

Kaishu Yamazaki (山崎 海秀, Yamazaki Kaishū; born 12 July 1997) is a Japanese professional footballer who plays as a defensive midfielder for Malaysian Football League club Kuching City.

== Club career ==
=== Youth ===
Yamazaki spent a season of his youth career in Germany with Darmstadt 98's U19 team in 2015.

=== Albirex Niigata Singapore ===
He signed for Albirex Niigata (S) from Iwaki FC for the 2018 Singapore Premier League. He made his debut for the White Swans in the 2018 Singapore Community Shield, winning his first piece of silverware in the process, after helping his team defeat Tampines Rovers 2–1. In total, he made 44 appearances for Albirex in all competitions, helping them land a domestic treble. At the end of the season, he was one of only four players to be retained by the White Swans.

Yamazaki played well in the 2019 Singapore Premier League season and was called up for the Sultan of Selangor's Cup to represent the Singapore Selection team. At the end of the season, he was also nominated for the Young Player of the Season award.

=== Lion City Sailors ===
Following his exploits for the White Swans, Yamazaki was snapped up local giants Lion City Sailors for the 2020 Singapore Premier League season.

=== Hougang United ===
1 season later, he joined Hougang United. He wins the 2022 Singapore Cup in the club's first-ever piece of silverware in their history.

=== Mosta ===
After 5 years in the Singapore Premier League, he joined European team Mosta, which currently plays in the Maltese Premier League, the top tier in Malta.

=== Persikabo 1973 ===
Ahead of the 2023–24 Liga 1, Yamazaki decided comeback to Southeast Asia and joined Indonesian Liga 1 club Persikabo 1973 alongside Singaporean coach, Aidil Sharin.

=== Kaya–Iloilo ===
In January 2014, Yamazaki moved to the Philippines to join Kaya–Iloilo. He made his debut for the club on 7 April in a 2–0 win against rivals United City. In the next league match against Don Bosco Garelli on 13 April, Yamazaki scored a brace in a 13–0 thrashing win. He helped his team to win the league title at the end of the season.

=== Kuching City ===
On 5 July 2026, Yamazaki signed for Kuching City as their second foreign player, with Dylan Wenzel-Halls signing the day before.

== Club statistics ==
As of 9 Dec 2024

Club	Season	League			Singapore Cup		League Cup / AFF Cup		Continential Cup		Total	
Club	Season	Division	Apps	Goals	Apps	Goals	Apps	Goals	Apps	Goals	Apps	Goals
Albirex Niigata (S)	2018	Singapore Premier League	15	0	3	0	0	0	0	0	18	0
Albirex Niigata (S)	2019	Singapore Premier League	24	3	3	0	0	0	0	0	27	3
Albirex Niigata (S)	Total		39	3	6	0	0	0	0	0	45	3
Lion City Sailor	2020	Singapore Premier League	13	2	0	0	0	0	0	0	13	2
Hougang United	2021	Singapore Premier League	20	1	0	0	0	0	0	0	20	1
Hougang United	2022	Singapore Premier League	19	3	0	0	0	0	3	0	22	3
Hougang United	Total		39	4	0	0	0	0	3	0	42	4
Mosta	2023–24	Maltese Premier League	6	0	0	0	3	0	0	0	9	0
Persikabo 1973	2023–24	Liga 1 (Indonesia)	17	0	0	0	0	0	0	0	17	0
Kaya–Iloilo	2024	Philippines Football League	13	3	0	0	0	0	0	0	13	3
Kaya–Iloilo	2024–25	Philippines Football League	5	0	0	0	2	0	6	1	13	1
Total			18	3	0	0	2	0	6	1	26	4
Career total			132	12	6	0	5	0	9	1	152	13

== Honours ==
=== Club ===
Albirex Niigata (S)

- Singapore Premier League: 2018
- Singapore Cup: 2018
- Singapore Community Shield: 2018

Hougang United

- Singapore Cup: 2022

==== Kaya–Iloilo ====
- Philippines Football League: 2024

=== Individual ===
- Singapore Premier League Team of the Year: 2019, 2020, 2021
