= Shahrin Saberin =

Singaporean footballer

Personal information
- Full name: Muhammad Shahrin bin Saberin
- Date of birth: 14 February 1995 (age 31)
- Place of birth: Singapore
- Height: 1.77 m (5 ft 10 in)
- Positions: Centre-back; defensive midfielder

Team information
- Current team: Tanjong Pagar United
- Number: 3

Youth career
- 2010–2013: SAFFC
- 2015: Home United FC

Senior career*
Years	Team	Apps	(Gls)
2016	Home United	13	(1)
2017	→ Young Lions (loan)	15	(0)
2018	Home United	16	(1)
2019–2020	Geylang International	17	(1)
2021–2025	Tanjong Pagar United	53	(1)

International career
2014–2017	Singapore U22	20	
- * Club domestic league appearances and goals as of December 28, 2016

Muhammad Shahrin bin Saberin is a Singaporean footballer who plays either as a centre-back or defensive-midfielder for Singapore Premier League club Tanjong Pagar United.

He was called up to the 2016 SOS Squad to face Selangor FA. He is also the captain of the Garena Young Lions and Singapore U-22. He was one of the nominees for the S.League Young Player of the Year 2016.

== Club career ==
=== Home United ===
Shahrin was part of the Singapore Armed Forces Football Club (SAFFC) U16 in 2010 after failing to make the cut to the Youth Olympic Games Squad. In 2012, he went back to SAFFC youth set up but this time with the U-18 team. After a successful season in 2012, he was promoted to the Warriors Prime League team. Singapore Cubs, which were then the Singapore U-20, was his next destination in 2014. The Singapore U-20 is a club under FAS and which was coached by former Technical Director of FAS, Slobodan Pavkovic, In 2015, he signed for the Home United Prime league team because of National Service (NS) and was trusted by the coach then, Philippe Aw to get his debut and eventually get more playing time in the Sleague. His first game was against the Courts Young Lions.

=== Young Lions ===
Shahrin signed for Garena Young Lions in 2017. He was the captain of that team.

=== Home United ===
Sharin returned to Home United after the loan from Garena Young Lions ended.

=== Geylang International ===
He moved to the Eagles for the 2019 season, seeking regular action.

== Career statistics ==
As of 11 Oct 2021

Club	Season	S.League		Singapore Cup		Singapore League Cup		Asia		Total	
Club	Season	Apps	Goals	Apps	Goals	Apps	Goals	Apps	Goals	Apps	Goals
Home United	2015	7	0	0	0	0	0	0	0	7	0
Home United	2016	18	1	2	0	0	0	0	0	20	1
Home United	Total	25	1	2	0	0	0	0	0	27	1
Garena Young Lions	2017	15	0	0	0	0	0	0	0	15	0
Home United	2018	13	0	1	0	0	0	6	0	20	0
Geylang International	2019	6	0	1	0	0	0	0	0	7	0
Geylang International	2020	7	1	0	0	0	0	0	0	7	1
Geylang International	Total	13	1	1	0	0	0	0	0	14	1
Tanjong Pagar United	2021	18	0	0	0	0	0	0	0	18	0
Tanjong Pagar United	2022	9	0	3	0	0	0	0	0	12	0
Tanjong Pagar United	2023	11	1	3	0	0	0	0	0	14	1
Tanjong Pagar United	2024–25	9	0	0	0	0	0	0	0	9	0
Tanjong Pagar United	Total	47	1	6	0	0	0	0	0	53	1
Career total		113	3	10	0	0	0	6	0	129	3
