= Kristijan Krajček =

Croatian footballer (born 1993)

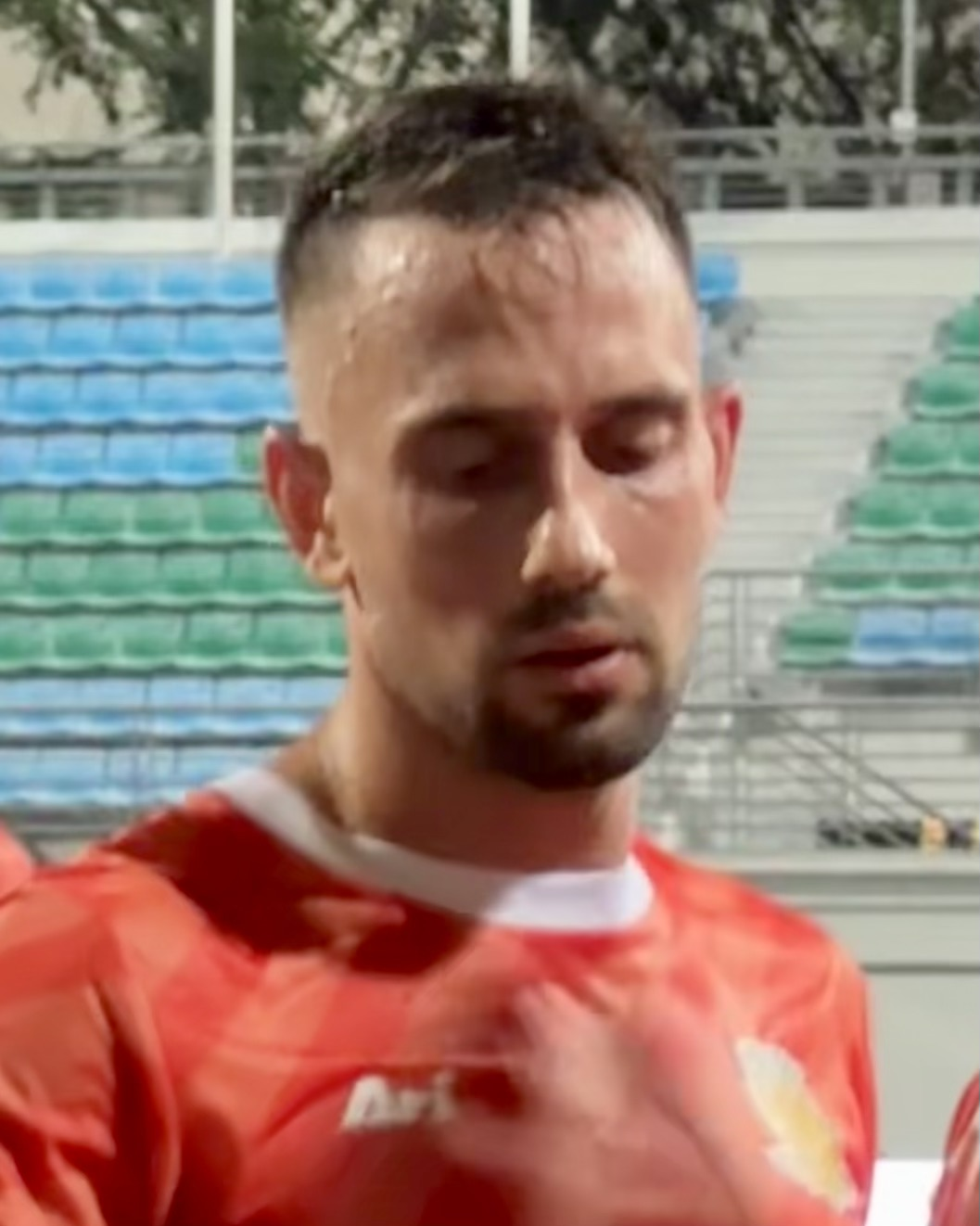
- Krajček with Hougang United in 2023

Personal information
- Date of birth: 1 October 1993 (age 33)
- Place of birth: Osijek, Croatia
- Height: 1.72 m (5 ft 8 in)
- Positions: Winger; attacking midfielder

Team information
- Current team: Hougang United
- Number: 10

Youth career
- –2011: Đakovo Croatia
- 2011: NK HAŠK

Senior career*
Years	Team	Apps	(Gls)
2012–2013	NK HAŠK	21	(1)
2013–2014	Đakovo Croatia	-	(-)
2014–2016	Bijelo Brdo	1	(0)
2016–2017	Hrvatski Dragovoljac	31	(3)
2017	Marsonia		
2018	Brežice 1919	13	(3)
2018	Bijelo Brdo	13	(2)
2019–2021	Balestier Khalsa	50	(16)
2022–2025	Hougang United	56	(21)
- * Club domestic league appearances and goals as of 5 January 2024

Kristijan Krajček (born 1 October 1993) is a Croatian professional footballer who recently played either as a winger or attacking-midfielder for Singapore Premier League club Hougang United. Considered as one of the best players in the league as well as Hougang United, Krajček is known for his free-kick abilities, assists, finishing, dribbling and long-range efforts.

He is the first ever player to score a hat-trick in a Singapore Cup Final when they faced Tampines Rovers at the Jalan Besar Stadium on 19 November 2022, where he helped the club win its first ever piece of silverware.

== Career ==
=== NK HASK ===
Krajček being his career with NK HASK when he was 17, after starting his football journey in an academy that is

=== Brežice 1919 ===
On 21 February 2018, Krajček joined Slovenian Second League club, Brežice 1919.

=== Bijelo Brdo ===
On 13 July 2018, Krajček moved to Bijelo Brdo.

=== Balestier Khalsa ===
On 2 February 2019, Krajček moved to Southeast Asia to joined Singapore Premier League club, Balestier Khalsa.

=== Hougang United ===
In January 2022, Krajček moved to another Singaporean club, Hougang United for the 2022 season. Having just joined the club at the beginning of the year, he became instrumental throughout the season helping them in finished as a runners up in the 2022 AFC Cup group stage, finishing third place in the league and also a hat-trick in the 2022 Singapore Cup final against Tampines Rovers which gave Hougang their first ever piece of silverware. He ends the season well with 12 goals and 17 assists in 34 appearances.

== Career statistics ==
=== Club ===
As of 16 September 2023

Club	Season	League			Cup		Asia		Total	
Club	Season	Division	Apps	Goals	Apps	Goals	Apps	Goals	Apps	Goals
NK HAŠK	2011–12	2. HNL	7	0	0	0	0	0	7	0
NK HAŠK	2012–13	2. HNL	21	1	0	0	0	0	21	1
NK HAŠK	Total		28	1	0	0	0	0	28	1
Bijelo Brdo	2014–15	3. HNL	–		2 (Note: Appearances in the Croatian Football Cup)	0	0	0	2	0
Bijelo Brdo	2015–16	3. HNL	–		1	0	0	0	1	0
Bijelo Brdo	Total		0	0	3	0	0	0	3	0
Hrvatski Dragovoljac	2016–17	2. HNL	31	3	0	0	0	0	31	3
Hrvatski Dragovoljac	Total		31	3	0	0	0	0	31	3
Brežice 1919	2017–18	2. SNL	13	3	0	0	0	0	13	3
Brežice 1919	Total		13	3	0	0	0	0	13	3
Bijelo Brdo	2018–19	2. HNL	13	2	1	0	0	0	14	2
Bijelo Brdo	Total		13	2	1	0	0	0	14	2
Balestier Khalsa	2019	Singapore Premier League	17	5	3	2	0	0	20	7
Balestier Khalsa	2020	Singapore Premier League	13	3	0	0	0	0	13	3
Balestier Khalsa	2021	Singapore Premier League	17	6	0	0	0	0	17	6
Balestier Khalsa	Total		47	14	3	2	0	0	50	16
Hougang United	2022	Singapore Premier League	25	7	5	5	3	0	33	12
Hougang United	2023	Singapore Premier League	20	9	1	0	1	0	22	9
Hougang United	2024–25	Singapore Premier League	0	0	0	0	0	0	0	0
Hougang United	Total		45	16	6	5	4	0	56	21
Career total			176	38	13	7	4	0	194	46

== Honours ==
=== Club ===
Hougang United

- Singapore Cup Champions (1): 2022
- Singapore Cup Runner-ups (1): 2023

=== Individual ===
- Singapore Premier League Team of the Year: 2020
