= Hairul Syirhan =

Singaporean footballer

Personal information
- Full name: Hairul Syirhan
- Date of birth: 21 August 1995 (age 31)
- Place of birth: Singapore
- Height: 1.78 m (5 ft 10 in)
- Position: Goalkeeper

Team information
- Current team: Geylang International
- Number: 1

Senior career*
Years	Team	Apps	(Gls)
2015–2016	Geylang International	1	(0)
2017–2018	Young Lions	17	(0)
2019–2021	Geylang International	32	(0)
2022–2023	Balestier Khalsa	40	(0)
2024–	Geylang International	0	(0)

International career
2016	Singapore U21		
- * Club domestic league appearances and goals as of 02:14, 23 November 2014 (UTC)

Hairul Syirhan (born 21 August 1995), better known as Hairul, is a Singaporean professional footballer who plays as a goalkeeper for Singapore Premier League club Geylang International and the Singapore national team.

== Club career ==
=== Geylang International ===
Hairul started his career with the Geylang International Prime League squad and was promoted to the 2015 S.League squad after impressing in the Prime League in the 2014 season.

=== Young Lions ===
In 2017, he was drafted to the Garena Young Lions squad while serving his National Service.

=== Geylang International ===
Hairul returned to Geylang International ahead of the 2019 Singapore Premier League season.

=== Balestier Khalsa ===
After a decade of being at Geylang, he left the club to ventures for new journey and signed for Balestier Khalsa.

=== Geylang International ===
After a year at Balestier, Hairul returned to Geylang International ahead of the 2024–25 Singapore Premier League season.

== International career ==
=== Youth ===
Hairul was part of the initial Singapore U21 team called up for the 2017 Southeast Asian Games.

=== Senior ===
In June 2023, Hairul was called up to the senior squad for the first time to face Papua New Guinea and Solomon Island but yet failed to make a single appearances. Hairul was called up again in September 2023 against Tajikistan and Chinese Taipei which he also missed out on on his international debut.

== Personal life ==
Hairul's father is Singapore's top golfer, Mardan Mamat.

== Career statistics ==
As of match played 10 Oct 2021. Caps and goals may not be correct

Club	Season	S.League		Singapore Cup		Singapore League Cup		Asia		Total	
Club	Season	Apps	Goals	Apps	Goals	Apps	Goals	Apps	Goals	Apps	Goals
Geylang International	2015	1	0	-	-	0	0	—		1	0
Geylang International	2016	0	0	-	-	0	0	—		0	0
Geylang International	Total	1	0	0	0	0	0	0	0	1	0
Young Lions	2017	9	0	-	-	0	0	—		9	0
Young Lions	2018	8	0	-	-	0	0	—		8	0
Young Lions	Total	17	0	0	0	0	0	0	0	17	0
Geylang International	2019	10	0	-	-	0	0	—		10	0
Geylang International	2020	11	0	-	-	0	0	—		11	0
Geylang International	2021	5	0	0	0	0	0	0	0	5	0
Geylang International	Total	26	0	0	0	0	0	0	0	26	0
Balestier Khalsa	2022	16	0	6	0	0	0	0	0	22	0
Balestier Khalsa	2023	24	0	3	0	0	0	0	0	27	0
Balestier Khalsa	Total	40	0	9	0	0	0	0	0	49	0
Geylang International	2024–25	8	0	0	0	0	0	0	0	8	0
Geylang International	Total	8	0	0	0	0	0	0	0	8	0
Career total		92	0	9	0	0	0	0	0	101	0

- Young Lions are ineligible for qualification to AFC competitions in their respective leagues.
