= 2020 Singapore Premier League =

Singapore Premier League
- Season: 2020
- Dates: 29 February – 5 December
- Champions: (Japan) Albirex Niigata (S) (4th title)
- AFC Champions League: Tampines Rovers
- AFC Cup: Lion City Sailors; Geylang International
- Matches: 56
- Goals: 185 (3.3 per match)
- Biggest home win: Lion City Sailors 5-0 Young Lions (1 November 2020); Lion City Sailors 6-1 Tanjong Pagar United (13 November 2020)
- Biggest away win: Balestier Khalsa 1-7 Lion City Sailors (7 November 2020)
- Highest scoring: Balestier Khalsa 1-7 Lion City Sailors (7 November 2020)
- Highest attendance: 2,723 (Tanjong Pagar 1-1 Sailors; 6 March 2020)
- Lowest attendance: 574 (Balestier 2-2 Albirex (S); 7 March 2020)

The 2020 Singapore Premier League (also known as the AIA Singapore Premier League due to sponsorship reasons) was the 3rd season of the Singapore Premier League, the top-flight Singaporean professional league for association football clubs, since its rebranding in 2018. The champions of the 2020 Singapore Premier League qualified for the AFC Champions League group stage automatically.

DPMM FC were the defending champions, but withdrew from the league prior to the season re-starting in October 2020. The league was won by Albirex Nigata (S) on the last matchday after beating Hougang United 1-0. Tampines Rovers qualified for the AFC Champions League as the highest ranked local team while Lion City Sailors and Geylang International qualified for the AFC Cup.

== Format ==
The following key changes were made to the rules for the 2020 season:

1. Singapore Premier League clubs can sign a maximum of four foreign players in the 2020 season, up from three as compared to 2019.
2. From 2019, only four stadiums host regular matches. The 8 teams (excluding DPMM) will host the matches in the following stadiums: Our Tampines Hub (Tampines Rovers and Geylang International), Jalan Besar Stadium (Young Lions and Hougang United), Bishan Stadium (Home United and Balestier Khalsa) and Jurong East Stadium (Albirex Niigata and Warriors FC).
3. For 2019, Albirex is allowed to sign as many locals as their budget allows. However, the club are only allowed one Singaporean over the age of 23. Also, Albirex must have two Singaporeans in their starting lineup for each game.
4. Each team is now able to register up to 28 players in their squad, an increase of 3 players as compared to 2018.
5. FAS had instructed Warriors FC to sit out the 2020 Singapore Premier League season due to their financial issue.
6. Tanjong Pagar United to replace Warriors FC in Singapore Premier League 2020.
7. Young Lions to play their home games at Jurong West Stadium, while Hougang United will move back to their previous home at Hougang Stadium. Tanjong Pagar United will take over Warriors and played in Jurong East Stadium.
8. Home United changed its name to Lion City Sailors Football Club ahead of the new season after being taken over by SEA Group. It is the 1st club in the SPL to be privatized.
9. Local SPL clubs are required to have a minimum of six U-23 players for a squad size of 19 to 25 players; this increases to seven (squad size 26), eight (27) and nine (28).
10. Players in the League shall be allocated jersey numbers 1 to 50. Jersey numbers that have been registered shall not be reused during the same season.

=== Disruptions due to COVID-19 ===
Due to the COVID-19 pandemic in Singapore and more generally in Southeast Asia, the season was halted from 27 March.

The Ministry of Culture, Community and Youth approved the season recommencement on 17 October. Competition rule changes included the provision for two water breaks during a match, and clubs will be able to use up to five substitutions (in defined windows after half-time).

On 26 October 2020, DPMM FC withdrew from the league due to travel restrictions.

== Teams ==
A total of 8 teams competed in the league. Albirex Niigata (S) from Japan is the only foreign team invited.

=== Stadiums and locations ===
Locations of the 2018 Singapore Premier League teams from Singapore

Team	Stadium	Capacity
Albirex Niigata (S)	Jurong East Stadium	2,700
Balestier Khalsa	Bishan Stadium	3,500
Geylang International	Our Tampines Hub	5,000
Hougang United	Hougang Stadium	3,800
Lion City Sailors	Bishan Stadium	3,500
Tampines Rovers	Our Tampines Hub	5,000
Tanjong Pagar United	Jurong East Stadium	2,700
Young Lions	Jurong West Stadium	3,200

=== Personnel and sponsors ===
Note: Flags indicate national team as has been defined under FIFA eligibility rules. Players may hold more than one non-FIFA nationality.

Team	Head coach	Captain	Kit manufacturer	Main Shirt sponsor	Other shirt sponsors
Albirex Niigata (S)	(Japan) Keiji Shigetomi	(Japan) Kazuki Hashioka	Mizuno	Canon	Kirin; EnglishCentral; Lensmode; Kubota; Reeracoen; Gain City; Nippon Medical Care; Fitogether
Balestier Khalsa	(Croatia) Marko Kraljević	(Singapore) Zaiful Nizam	Adidas	Jeep	Weston Corporation; Project Vaults; StarBalm
Geylang International	(Singapore) Mohd Noor Ali	(Japan) Yuki Ichikawa	FBT	Epson	Heng Motor; Chiang Kong; Broadway; D2D Sports; SoundTech
Hougang United	(Singapore) Clement Teo	(Singapore) Khairulhin Khalid	Warrix		SportCenter by Zup; Polar Water
Lion City Sailors	(Australia) Aurelio Vidmar	(Singapore) Izzdin Shafiq	Puma	SEA	Shopee
Tampines Rovers	(Singapore) Gavin Lee	(Singapore) Yasir Hanapi	Mizuno	Hyundai Avante	ANA Courier Express; StarBalm
Tanjong Pagar United	(Singapore) Hasrin Jailani	(Singapore) Faritz Abdul Hameed	Thorb		
Young Lions	(Singapore) Nazri Nasir	(Singapore) Jacob Mahler	Nike		Catapult

=== Coaching changes ===
Team	Outgoing Head Coach	Manner of Departure	Date of Vacancy	Position in table	Incoming Head Coach	Date of appointment
Young Lions	(Singapore) Fandi Ahmad	Contract End	31 December 2019	Pre-Season	(Singapore) Nazri Nasir	1 January 2020
Lion City Sailors	(Singapore) Noh Rahman (Interim)	End of Caretaker	31 December 2019	Pre-Season	(Australia) Aurelio Vidmar	
Tanjong Pagar United	NA	NA	NA	Pre-Season	(Singapore) Hairi Su'ap	1 January 2020
Tanjong Pagar United	(Singapore) Hairi Su'ap	Resigned	14 October 2020	7th	(Singapore) Hasrin Jailani	14 October 2020

=== Foreigners ===
Singapore Premier League clubs can sign a maximum of four foreign players in the 2020 season, up from three as compared to 2019. However, one of them has to be 21 years old or younger on 1 January 2020.

Albirex Niigata can sign up unlimited number of Singaporean players for the new season. Only 1 local player above 23 years old is allowed.

Players name in bold indicates the player was registered during the mid-season transfer window.

Club	Player 1	Player 2	Player 3	U21 Player 1	SG U-23 Player 1	SG U-23 Player 2	SG U-23 Player 3	Former Players
Albirex Niigata (S)	(Singapore) Hyrulnizam Juma'at	(Singapore) Fairoz Hassan	(Singapore) Gareth Low	(Singapore) Ong Yu En	(Singapore) Iman Hakim	(Singapore) Aizil Yazid	(Singapore) Kenji Austin	(Singapore) Sharul Nizam (Singapore) Zamani Zamri (Singapore) Daniel Goh
Balestier Khalsa	(Japan) Shuhei Hoshino	(Croatia) Šime Žužul	(Croatia) Kristijan Krajcek	(Serbia) Ensar Brunčević				
Geylang International	(Japan) Yuki Ichikawa	(Netherlands) Barry Maguire		(Kyrgyzstan) Kamolidin Tashiev				(Cape Verde) Gilson Varela (Greece) Panagiotis Linardos
Hougang United	(England) Charlie Machell	(Australia) Zachary Anderson		(Kyrgyzstan) Maksat Dzhakybaliev				(Croatia) Stipe Plazibat
Lion City Sailors	(South Korea) Song Ui-young	(Japan) Kaishu Yamazaki	(Croatia) **Stipe Plazibat**					(Australia) Andy Pengelly
Tampines Rovers	(Japan) Kyoga Nakamura	(Canada) Jordan Webb	(Montenegro) Boris Kopitović	(Serbia) Zehrudin Mehmedović				
Tanjong Pagar United	(Japan) Takahiro Tanaka	(Japan) Shodai Nishikawa	(Brazil) Luiz Júnior	(Brazil) Yann Motta				

Note 1: Albirex is allowed to sign as many locals as their budget allows. However, the club are only allowed one Singaporean over the age of 23.

Note 2: Hougang United releases Charlie Machell and Zac Anderson before the season end as their contracts ended 30 November 2020 were not extended.

== League table ==
Pos	Team	Pld	W	D	L	GF	GA	GD	Pts	Qualification or relegation
1	Albirex Niigata (S) (Note: The foreign club – Albirex Niigata (S) – as well as the Football Association of Singapore (FAS) under-21 team, Young Lions, are ineligible for any AFC competition spots.) (C)	14	10	2	2	32	14	+18	32	
2	Tampines Rovers	14	8	5	1	27	11	+16	29	Qualification for AFC Champions League group stage
3	Lion City Sailors	14	8	3	3	44	18	+26	27	Qualification for AFC Cup group stage
4	Geylang International	14	6	2	6	18	22	−4	20	Qualification for AFC Cup group stage
5	Balestier Khalsa	14	5	4	5	22	28	−6	19	
6	Hougang United	14	4	3	7	19	24	−5	15	
7	Young Lions	14	3	0	11	12	38	−26	9	
8	Tanjong Pagar United	14	0	5	9	14	33	−19	5	

Source: Singapore Premier League
Rules for classification: 1) points; 2) goal difference; 3) number of goals scored; 4) number of wins
(C) Champions

== Results ==
Home \ Away	ALB	TAM	LCS	GEY	HOU	BAL	YLI	TPU
Albirex Niigata (S)	—	1–4	3–2	4–0	4–0	2–0	2–0	3–0
Tampines Rovers	2–0	—	4–0	1–1	1–2	1–0	1–0	2–0
Lion City Sailors	2–3	1–1	—	4–0	1–1	5–2	5–0	6–1
Geylang International	0–1	1–1	0–3	—	2–0	2–3	3–0	2–1
Hougang United	0–1	0–2	1–3	1–2	—	1–2	4–1	3–2
Balestier Khalsa	2–2	2–2	1–7	2–0	2–2	—	1–2	2–2
Young Lions	0–4	1–3	0–4	1–2	1–4	0–2	—	2–1
Tanjong Pagar United	2–2	2–2	1–1	0–3	0–0	0–1	2–4	—

Updated to match(es) played on 20 March 2020. Source:
Legend: Blue = home team win; Yellow = draw; Red = away team win.
For upcoming matches, an "a" indicates there is an article about the rivalry between the two participants.

== Statistics ==
=== Top scorers ===
As at 5 December 2020

Rank	Player	Club	Goals
1	(Croatia) Stipe Plazibat	Hougang United / Lion City Sailors	14
2	(Japan) Tomoyuki Doi	Albirex Niigata (S)	11
3	(Montenegro) Boris Kopitović	Tampines Rovers	9
3	(South Korea) Song Ui-young	Lion City Sailors	9
4	(Canada) Jordan Webb	Tampines Rovers	7
4	(Brazil) Luiz Júnior	Tanjong Pagar United	7
5	(Croatia) Sime Zuzul	Balestier Khalsa	6
6	(Japan) Reo Nishiguchi	Albirex Niigata (S)	5
6	(Singapore) Gabriel Quak	Lion City Sailors	5
7	(Japan) Ryoya Tanigushi	Albirex Niigata (S)	4
7	(Japan) Shuhei Hoshino	Balestier Khalsa	4
7	(Singapore) Adam Swandi	Lion City Sailors	4
7	(Singapore) Khairul Nizam	Geylang International	4
7	(Singapore) Shawal Anuar	Hougang United	4

=== Top assists ===
As at 5 December 2020

Rank	Player	Club	Assists
1	(Singapore) Gabriel Quak	Lion City Sailors	7
2	(Singapore) Shahdan Sulaiman	Lion City Sailors	6
3	(Croatia) Stipe Plazibat	Hougang United/ Lion City Sailors	5 (1 for Hougang, 4 for LCS)
3	(Canada) Jordan Webb	Tampines Rovers	5
3	(Croatia) Kristijan Krajček	Balestier Khalsa	5
3	(Singapore) Nur Adam Abdullah	Young Lions	5

=== Clean Sheets ===
As at 5 December 2020

Rank	Player	Club	Clean sheets
1	(Japan) Kei Okawa	Albirex Niigata (S)	8
2	(Singapore) Syazwan Buhari	Tampines Rovers	6
3	(Singapore) Hassan Sunny	Lion City Sailors	4
4	(Singapore) Zaiful Nizam	Balestier Khalsa	3
5	(Singapore) Hairul Syirhan	Geylang International	2
6	(Singapore) Zainol Gulam	Geylang International	1
6	(Singapore) Kenji Syed Rusydi	Tanjong Pagar United	1
6	(Singapore) Ridhuan Barudin	Hougang United	1

=== Hat-tricks ===
Player	For	Against	Result	Date	Reference
(Croatia) Stipe Plazibat	Hougang United	Young Lions	4–1	1 March 2020	
(Croatia) Stipe Plazibat	Lion City Sailors	Balestier Khalsa	7–1	7 November 2020	
(Canada) Jordan Webb	Tampines Rovers	Young Lions	3–1	17 November 2020	

=== Penalty missed ===
Player	For	Against	Date
(Japan) Shuhei Hoshino	Balestier Khalsa	Tampines Rovers	1 March 2020

=== Man of the Match ===
As of 5 December 2020

Rank	Player	Club	Man of the Match
1	(Croatia) Stipe Plazibat	Hougang United / Lion City Sailors	4 (2 for Hougang & 2 for LCS)
1	(Canada) Jordan Webb	Tampines Rovers	4
2	(Singapore) Gabriel Quak	Lion City Sailors	3
2	(Japan) Tomoyuki Doi	Albirex Niigata (S)	3
3	(Singapore) Khairul Nizam	Geylang International	2
3	(Netherlands) Barry Maguire	Geylang International	2
3	(Singapore) Christopher van Huizen	Geylang International	2
3	(Japan) Ryosuke Nagasawa	Albirex Niigata (S)	2
3	(Brazil) Luiz Júnior	Tanjong Pagar United	2
3	(Singapore) Shawal Anuar	Hougang United	2
3	(Japan) Kyoga Nakamura	Tampines Rovers	2

=== Discipline ===
==== Player ====
- Most yellow cards: 7
  - Ahmad Syahir (Balestier Khalsa)
- Most red cards: 1
  - Adam Hakeem (Geylang International)
  - Delwinder Singh (Tanjong Pagar United)
  - Fadli Kamis (Balestier Khalsa)
  - Firdaus Kasman (Geylang International)
  - Khairul Nizam (Geylang International)
  - Hami Syahin (Geylang International)
  - Shahfiq Ghani (Hougang United)
  - Shahrin Saberin (Geylang International)
  - Zainol Gulam (Geylang International)
  - Zulfadhmi Suzliman (Balestier Khalsa)

== Awards ==
=== Monthly awards ===
Month	Player of the Month		Young Player of the Month		Reference
Month	Coach	Club	Player	Club	Reference
April					

== Singapore Premier League Awards night winners ==
Awards	Winners	Club
Player of the Year	(Singapore) Gabriel Quak	Lion City Sailors
Young Player of the Year	(Singapore) Saifullah Akbar	Lion City Sailors
Coach of the Year	(Japan) Keiji Shigetomi	Albirex Niigata (S)
Top Scorer Award	(Croatia) Stipe Plazibat	Lion City Sailors
Fair Play Award	Albirex Niigata (S)	
Referee of the Year	(Singapore) Ahmad A'Qashah	—N/a

AIA Team of the Year
Goalkeeper	(Singapore) Syazwan Buhari (Tampines Rovers)			
Defence	(Singapore) Tajeli Salamat (Lion City Sailors)	(Japan) Kaishu Yamazaki (Lion City Sailors)	(Japan) Kazuki Hashioka ( (Japan) Albirex Niigata (S))	(Singapore) Daniel Bennett (Tampines Rovers)
Midfield	(Croatia) Kristijan Krajcek (Balestier Khalsa)	(Japan) Kyoga Nakamura (Tampines Rovers)	(Singapore) Gabriel Quak (Lion City Sailors)	(South Korea) Song Ui-young (Lion City Sailors)
Attack	(Brazil) Luiz Júnior (Tanjong Pagar United)		(Croatia) Stipe Plazibat (Lion City Sailors)	
