= 2018 Tampines Rovers FC season =

Tampines Rovers FC
2018 season
- Chairman: Desmond Ong
- Coach: Jürgen Raab
- Ground: Our Tampines Hub
- Top goalscorer: League: Khairul Amri (15); All: Khairul Amri (19)
Home colours	Away colours

The 2018 S.League season is Tampines Rovers's 23rd season at the top level of Singapore football and 73rd year in existence as a football club. The club will also compete in the Singapore League Cup, Singapore Cup, Singapore Community Shield and the AFC Cup.

== Key events ==
=== Pre-season ===
On 9/12/2017, it was announced that the team had signed 15 players in the preparation for the 2018 AFC Champions Leagues qualifier against Bali United.

On 25/12/2017, ESPN FC reported that Jordan Webb rebutted the chance to join Portugal League 2 team as he wanted to work with Rabb.

On 12/1/2018, it was reported that Jordan Webb & Ryutaro Megumi will miss the Tampines' ACL playoff due to injury.

On 28/2/2018, Rabb confirmed that Shannon Stephen will be out of the season due to a ligament injury.

== Squad ==
=== Sleague Squad ===
As of 22 April 2018

No.	Name	Nationality	Date of birth (age)	Last club	Contract Since	Contract End
Goalkeepers
1	Hariz Farid ^{U23}	(Singapore)	19 October 1997 (age 28)	Youth Team	2017	2018
21	Haikal Hasnol ^{U23}	(Singapore)	4 November 1995 (age 30)	Youth Team	2017	2020
24	Syazwan Buhari	(Singapore)	22 September 1992 (age 34)	(Singapore) Geylang International	2018	2019
Defenders
2	Madhu Mohana	(Singapore)	6 March 1991 (age 35)	(Malaysia) Negeri Sembilan FA	2018	2018
4	Fahrudin Mustafic (captain) ^{>30}	(Singapore) (Serbia)	17 April 1981 (age 45)	(Indonesia) Persela Lamongan	2011	2018
5	Amirul Adli ^{U23}	(Singapore)	13 January 1996 (age 30)	(Singapore) Young Lions FC	2018	2020
12	Shannon Stephen	(Singapore)	2 June 1994 (age 32)	(Singapore) Young Lions FC	2017	2020
13	Shameer Aziq ^{U23}	(Singapore)	30 December 1995 (age 30)	(Singapore) Young Lions FC	2018	2018
16	Daniel Bennett ^{>30}	(Singapore) (England)	7 January 1978 (age 48)	(Singapore) Geylang International	2017	2019
17	Irwan Shah	(Singapore)	2 November 1988 (age 37)	(Singapore) Warriors FC	2016	2019
22	Danish Uwais ^{U23}	(Singapore)	10 October 1999 (age 27)	Youth Team	2017	2018
23	Irfan Najeeb ^{U23}	(Singapore)	31 July 1999 (age 27)	(Singapore) NFA U18	2018	2020
63	Ryhan Stewart ^{U19}	(Singapore) (Wales)	15 February 2000 (age 26)	Youth Team	2017	2018
Midfielders
6	Safirul Sulaiman	(Singapore)	12 October 1992 (age 34)	(Singapore) Geylang International	2018	2019
7	Zulfadhmi Suzliman ^{U23}	(Singapore)	10 February 1996 (age 30)	Youth Team	2017	2020
14	Haziq Razzali ^{U23}	(Singapore)	23 July 1999 (age 27)	(Singapore) NFA U18	2018	2018
18	Yasir Hanapi	(Singapore)	21 June 1989 (age 37)	(Malaysia) PDRM FA	2018	2020
20	Faizal Raffi ^{U23}	(Singapore)	20 January 1996 (age 30)	Youth Team	2017	2018
27	Hafiz Sujad	(Singapore)	1 November 1990 (age 35)	(Malaysia) JDT II	2018	2018
59	Elijah Lim Teck Yong ^{U19}	(Singapore)	8 May 2001 (age 25)	(Singapore) NFA U17	2018	2018
65	Shah Shahiran ^{U19}	(Singapore)	14 November 1999 (age 26)	(Singapore) NFA U18	2018	2018
Forwards
9	Ryutaro Megumi	(Japan)	29 June 1993 (age 33)	(Japan) Aoyama Gakuin University	2017	2019
11	Jordan Webb	(Canada) (Jamaica)	24 March 1988 (age 38)	(Singapore) Warriors FC	2018	2020
19	Khairul Amri ^{>30}	(Singapore)	14 March 1985 (age 41)	(Singapore) Young Lions FC	2017	2020
29	Taufik Suparno ^{U23}	(Singapore)	31 October 1995 (age 30)	(Singapore) SAFSA	2018	2018
Players loaned out
3	Afiq Yunos	(Singapore)	10 December 1990 (age 35)	(Singapore) Home United	2018	2020
8	Shahdan Sulaiman	(Singapore)	9 May 1988 (age 38)	(Singapore) LionsXII	2016	2020
10	Fazrul Nawaz ^{>30}	(Singapore)	17 April 1985 (age 41)	(Singapore) Warriors FC	2016	2019

== Coaching staff ==
Position	Name	Ref.
Chairman	(Singapore) Desmond Ong	
General Manager	(Singapore) Desmund Khusnin	
Head coach	(Germany) Jürgen Raab	
Team manager	(Singapore) Leonard Koh	
Assistant coach	(Singapore) Gavin Lee	
Goalkeeping coach	(Singapore) William Phang	
Physiotherapist	(Singapore) Premjit Singh	
Kitman	(Singapore) Goh Koon Hiang	

== Transfers ==
=== Pre-season transfers ===
==== In ====
Position	Player	Transferred From	Ref
GK	(Singapore) Syazwan Buhari	(Singapore) Geylang International	2 years contract
DF	(Singapore) Afiq Yunos	(Singapore) Home United	3 years contract
DF	(Singapore) Amirul Adli Azmi	(Singapore) Garena Young Lions	3 years contract
DF	(Singapore) Irfan Najeeb	(Singapore) NFA U18	1 year contract
DF	(Singapore) Madhu Mohana	(Malaysia) Negeri Sembilan FA	1 year contract
MF	(Singapore) Shah Shahiran	(Singapore) NFA U18	1 year contract
MF	(Singapore) Safirul Sulaiman	(Singapore) Geylang International	2 years contract
MF	(Singapore) Yasir Hanapi	(Malaysia) PDRM FA	3 years contract
MF	(Singapore) Hanafi Akbar	(Singapore) Balestier Khalsa	Undisclosed
MF	(Singapore) Haziq Razzali	(Singapore) NFA U18	Undisclosed
FW	(Canada) Jordan Webb	(Singapore) Warriors FC	3 years contract
FW	(Singapore) Shameer Aziq	(Singapore) Garena Young Lions	Undisclosed

==== Out ====
Position	Player	Transferred To	Ref
GK	(Singapore) Joey Sim	(Singapore) Tiong Bahru FC	
GK	(Singapore) Izwan Mahbud	(Thailand) Nongbua Pitchaya	
DF	(Singapore) Madhu Mohana	(Malaysia) Negeri Sembilan F.C.	
DF	(Singapore) Imran Sahib		
DF	(Singapore) Ismadi Mukhtar	(Singapore) Warriors FC	
DF	(Singapore) Jufri Taha	(Singapore) Geylang International	
DF	(Singapore) Shakir Hamzah	(Singapore) Home United	
DF	(Singapore) Ehvin Sasidharan		
MF	(Singapore) Jamil Ali		
MF	(Singapore) Shahdan Sulaiman	(Malaysia) Melaka United	Season loan
MF	(South Korea) Son Yong-chan	(India) Ozone F.C.	
MF	(Singapore) Hafiz Sujad	(Malaysia) JDT II	
MF	(Singapore) Fazli Ayob	(Singapore) Home United	
MF	(Singapore) Amirul Haziq	(Singapore) Yishun Sentek Mariners FC (NFL Club)	
FW	(Singapore) Hafiz Rahim		
FW	(Croatia) Ivan Jakov Džoni	(Croatia) NK Imotski	
FW	(United States) Diego Silvas		
FW	(Singapore) Rafiq Tajudin		

Note 1: Rafiq Tajudin was initially promoted to the Sleague before being deregistered.

Note 2: Madhu Mohana initially moved to Malaysia before being released and signed with the Stags for the rest of season.

Note 3: Hafiz Sujad initially moved to Malaysia with JDT II before being released and signed with the Stags for the rest of season.

==== Retained ====
Position	Player	Ref
FW	(Singapore) Khairul Amri	1) 2 years contract signed in Jan 2017; 2) Extend another 3 years in Dec 2017.

==== Extension ====
Position	Player	Ref
GK	(Singapore) Haikal Hasnol	3 years contract.
DF	(Singapore) Fahrudin Mustafić	1 year contract.
DF	(Singapore) Daniel Bennett	2 years contract.
DF	(Singapore) Irwan Shah	2 years contract.
DF	(Singapore) Shannon Stephen	3 years contract.
MF	(Japan) Ryutaro Megumi	2 years contract.
MF	(Singapore) Shahdan Sulaiman	3 years contract.
FW	(Singapore) Fazrul Nawaz	2 years contract.

==== Promoted ====
Position	Player	Ref
GK	(Singapore) Hariz Farid	1 year contract
DF	(Singapore) Ryhan Stewart	1 year contract
DF	(Singapore) Danish Uwais	1 year contract
MF	(Singapore) Zulfadhmi Suzliman	3 years contract
FW	(Singapore) Faizal Raffi	1 year contract
FW	(Singapore) Rafiq Tajudin	1 year contract

==== Trial ====
Position	Player	Trial @	Ref

=== Mid-season transfers ===
==== In ====
Position	Player	Transferred From	Ref
DF	(Singapore) Hafiz Sujad	(Malaysia) JDT II	
FW	(Singapore) Taufik Suparno	(Singapore) SAFSA	

==== Out ====
Position	Player	Transferred To	Ref
DF	(Singapore) Afiq Yunos	(Singapore) Geylang International	Season loan
MF	(Singapore) Hanafi Akbar	Free Agent	
FW	(Singapore) Fazrul Nawaz	(Singapore) Hougang United	Loan then $50,000
MF	(Singapore) Shah Shahiran	Relegated to U19 squad	
DF	(Singapore) Ryhan Stewart	Relegated to U19 squad	

==== Extension ====
Position	Player	Ref
DF	(Singapore) Irfan Najeeb	3 years contract.

== Friendlies ==
=== Pre-Season Friendly ===
Win Draw Loss

6 January 2018 1	Tampines Rovers (Singapore)	2–1	(Malaysia) JDT II	Jalan Besar Stadium
	Ryutaro Megumi 14'; Fazrul Nawaz 75'		Nicolás Alberto Fernández 85'

11 January 2018 2	Tampines Rovers (Singapore)	2–0	(Singapore) Geylang International	Our Tampines Hub
	Zulfadhmi Suzliman 59'; Fahrudin Mustafic 83' (pen.)

1 February 2018 3	Rydalmere Lions (Australia)	3–2	(Singapore) Tampines Rovers	Our Tampines Hub
1700 hours			Zulfadhmi Suzliman

== Team statistics ==
=== Appearances and goals ===
As of 29 September 2018

No.	Pos.	Player	Sleague		Singapore Cup		ACL / AFC Cup		Total	
No.	Pos.	Player	Apps.	Goals	Apps.	Goals	Apps.	Goals	Apps.	Goals
1	GK	(Singapore) Hariz Farid	0(1)	0	0(1)	0	0	0	2	0
2	MF	(Singapore) Madhu Mohana	10(9)	1	2	0	0	0	21	1
4	DF	(Singapore) Fahrudin Mustafic	19	1	1	0	7	0	27	1
5	DF	(Singapore) Amirul Adli	23	4	2	0	6	0	31	4
6	MF	(Singapore) Safirul Sulaiman	2(1)	0	0	0	6	0	9	0
7	MF	(Singapore) Zulfadhmi Suzliman	14(8)	1	1(1)	0	3(4)	0	31	1
9	FW	(Japan) Ryutaro Megumi	24	4	2	0	5	0	31	4
11	MF	(Canada) Jordan Webb	22(1)	5	2	1	3(1)	1	29	7
12	DF	(Singapore) Shannon Stephen	0	0	0	0	2	1	2	1
13	FW	(Singapore) Shameer Aziq	17(2)	1	1	0	3	0	23	1
14	MF	(Singapore) Haziq Razzali	0	0	0	0	0	0	0	0
16	DF	(Singapore) Daniel Bennett	22(1)	1	1(1)	0	7	0	32	1
17	DF	(Singapore) Irwan Shah	16(5)	1	2	0	6	0	29	1
18	MF	(Singapore) Yasir Hanapi	22	2	1	0	5	0	28	2
19	FW	(Singapore) Khairul Amri	16(5)	15	2	2	6(1)	2	30	19
20	MF	(Singapore) Faizal Raffi	1(1)	0	0	0	0	0	2	0
21	GK	(Singapore) Haikal Hasnol	0	0	0	0	1	0	1	0
22	DF	(Singapore) Danish Uwais	0	0	0	0	0	0	0	0
23	DF	(Singapore) Irfan Najeeb	16	2	2	0	4(2)	1	24	3
24	GK	(Singapore) Syazwan Buhari	24	0	2	0	6	0	32	0
27	MF	(Singapore) Hafiz Sujad	4(8)	0	1(1)	0	0	0	14	0
29	FW	(Singapore) Taufik Suparno	1(3)	0	0(1)	0	0	0	5	0
59	MF	(Singapore) Elijah Lim Teck Yong	0	0	0	0	0	0	0	0
63	DF	(Singapore) Ryhan Stewart	0	0	0	0	0	0	0	0
65	MF	(Singapore) Shah Shahiran	0(9)	0	0	0	0(4)	0	13	0
Players who have played this season and/or sign for the season but had left the club or on loan to other club
2	MF	(Singapore) Hanafi Akbar	0	0	0	0	0	0	0	0
3	DF	(Singapore) Afiq Yunos	1(2)	0	0	0	3(3)	0	9	0
10	FW	(Singapore) Fazrul Nawaz	7(6)	4	0	0	4(2)	1	19	5
14	FW	(Singapore) Rafiq Tajudin	0	0	0	0	0	0	0	0

== Competitions ==
=== Overview ===
Competition	Record							
Competition	P	W	D	L	GF	GA	GD	Win %
S.League	24	12	4	8	43	27	+16	50.00
AFC Champions League	1	0	0	1	1	3	−2	0.00
AFC Cup	6	0	1	5	5	14	−9	0.00
Singapore Cup	2	1	0	1	3	4	−1	50.00
Total	33	13	5	15	52	48	+4	39.39

=== Singapore Premier League ===
Win Draw Loss

31 March 2018 Round 1	Albirex Niigata (S) (Singapore)	2–1	(Singapore) Tampines Rovers	Singapore Sports Hub
1730hrs	Taku Morinaga 59'; Shuhei Hoshino 89'		Mustafic Fahrudin 77'	Stadium: Singapore Sports Hub; Attendance: 18942; Referee: W. Ravisanthiran (Singapore)

7 April 2018 Round 2	Tampines Rovers (Singapore)	3–1	(Singapore) Geylang International	Our Tampines Hub
	Jordan Webb 1' 36'; Khairul Amri 81' (pen.)		Fairoz Hasan 45+5'; Yuki Ichikawa (yellow card) 84'

18 April 2018 Round 3	Tampines Rovers (Singapore)	4–0	(Singapore) Hougang United	Our Tampines Hub
	Shameer Aziq 19'; Khairul Amri 24'; Irwan Shah 67'; Jordan Webb 86'; Fahrudin Mustafic (yellow card) 83'

21 April 2018 Round 4	Warriors FC (Singapore)	0–0	(Singapore) Tampines Rovers	Choa Chu Kang Stadium
	Emmeric Ong (yellow card) 43'; Poh Yi Feng (yellow card) 58'; Tajeli Salamat (yellow card) 58'; Fadhil Noh (yellow card) 79'; Ho Wai Loon (yellow card) 85'		Yasir Hanapi (yellow card) 37'; Fazrul Nawaz (yellow card) 81'

2 May 2018 Round 5	Tampines Rovers (Singapore)	1–0	(Singapore) Balestier Khalsa	Our Tampines Hub
	Irfan Najeeb 49'			Referee: Muhammad Zulfiqar (Singapore)

26 June 2018 Round 6 (Rescheduled)	Tampines Rovers (Singapore)	1–0	(Singapore) Home United	Our Tampines Hub
	Amirul Adli 46'			Referee: Ahmad A'Qashah (Singapore)

20 May 2018 Round 7	Tampines Rovers (Singapore)	3–4	(Singapore) Albirex Niigata (S)	Our Tampines Hub
	Fazrul Nawaz 24'; Ryutaro Megumi 63'; Zulfadhmi Suzliman 76'		Ryujiro Yamanaka 8' 65'; Shuhei Hoshino 47'; Daiki Asaoka 90+1'

27 May 2018 Round 8	Geylang International (Singapore)	1–2	(Singapore) Tampines Rovers	Bedok Stadium
	Fairoz Hasan 90'; Faud Ramli (yellow card) 59'		Ryutaro Megumi 85'; Fazrul Nawaz 90+1'

30 May 2018 Round 9	Garena Young Lions (Singapore)	0–4	(Singapore) Tampines Rovers	Jalan Besar Stadium
			Fazrul Nawaz 13'; Amirul Adli 71'; Ryutaro Megumi 90+1' 90+3'

3 June 2018 Round 10	Tampines Rovers (Singapore)	3–1	(Singapore) Garena Young Lions	Our Tampines Hub
	Yasir Hanapi 19' 27'; Khairul Amri 90+2'		Ikhsan Fandi 31'	Referee: Y.Sathyakumar (Singapore)

9 June 2018 Round 11	Hougang United (Singapore)	0–2	(Singapore) Tampines Rovers	Hougang Stadium
	Faiz Salleh (yellow card) 60'; Syahiran Miswan (yellow card) 79'; Stanley Ng (yellow card) 86'; Illyas Lee (yellow card) 87'		Fazrul Nawaz 45+1'; Khairul Amri 69'; Shameer Aziq (yellow card) 22' (yellow card) 59' (yellow-red card); Yasir Hanapi (yellow card) 79'

17 June 2018 Round 12	Tampines Rovers (Singapore)	2–3	(Singapore) Warriors FC	Our Tampines Hub
	Khairul Amri 84'; Jordan Webb 88'; Zulfadhmi Suzliman (yellow card) 45'		Jonathan Béhé 12' (pen.) 32' 61'; Ho Wai Loon (yellow card) 69'	Referee: Jansen Foo (Singapore)

30 June 2018 Round 13	Balestier Khalsa (Singapore)	2–5	(Singapore) Tampines Rovers	Toa Payoh Stadium
	Hazzuwan Halim 21' (pen.); Akbar Shah 78'		Irfan Najeeb 9'; Khairul Amri 25' 70' 90+1'; Jordan Webb 90+3'

4 July 2018 Round 14	Tampines Rovers (Singapore)	0–2	Brunei DPMM	Our Tampines Hub
			Volodymyr Pryyomov 40' (pen.) 49'	Referee: G.Letchman (Singapore)

8 July 2018 Round 15	Home United (Singapore)	0–0	(Singapore) Tampines Rovers	Bishan Stadium
				Referee: Muhammad Taqi Aljaafari Bin Jahari (Singapore)

14 July 2018 Round 16	Albirex Niigata (S) (Singapore)	2–1	(Singapore) Tampines Rovers	Jurong East Stadium
	Shuhei Hoshino 1' 50'		Khairul Amri 87'	Referee: Jansen Foo

18 July 2018 Round 17	Brunei DPMM	1–1	(Singapore) Tampines Rovers	Hassanal Bolkiah National Stadium
	Adi Said 58' (yellow card) 13'; Abdul Aziz Tamit (yellow card) 45+1'; Abdul Mu'iz Sisa (yellow card) 80'		Khairul Amri 45'; Madhu Mohana (yellow card) 72'; Daniel Bennett (yellow card) 80'; Jordan Webb (yellow card) 90+2'	Referee: Muhammad Taqi Aljaafari Bin Jahari (Singapore)

21 July 2018 Round 18	Tampines Rovers (Singapore)	4–1	(Singapore) Geylang International	Our Tampines Hub
	Khairul Amri 50' 60' 65' (pen.); Amirul Adli 89'; Daniel Bennett (yellow card) 31'; Zulfadhmi Suzliman (yellow card) 84'		Fairoz Hasan 33' (yellow card) 79'; Faud Ramli (yellow card) 26'; Afiq Yunos (yellow card) 64'	Referee: Muhammad Zulfiqar (Singapore)

1 August 2018 Round 19	Garena Young Lions (Singapore)	2–1	(Singapore) Tampines Rovers	Jalan Besar Stadium
	Ikhsan Fandi 41'; Irfan Fandi 89'		Amirul Adli 27'	Referee: W. Ravisanthiran (Singapore)

12 August 2018 Round 20	Tampines Rovers (Singapore)	1–0	(Singapore) Hougang United	Our Tampines Hub
	Illyas Lee 12' (o.g.)			Referee: W. Ravisanthiran (Singapore)

15 August 2018 Round 21	Warriors FC (Singapore)	2–1	(Singapore) Tampines Rovers	Choa Chu Kang Stadium
	Khairul Nizam 57'; Jonathan Béhé 86' (yellow card) 82'; Hafiz Sulaiman (yellow card) 19'; Sahil Sulaiman (yellow card) 79'		Khairul Amri 20' (pen.); Jordan Webb (yellow card) 75'	Referee: G.Letchmann (Singapore)

15 September 2018 Round 22 (Rescheduled)	Tampines Rovers (Singapore)	1–0	(Singapore) Balestier Khalsa	Our Tampines Hub
	Madhu Mohana 39'

22 September 2018 Round 23	Brunei DPMM	2–1	(Singapore) Tampines Rovers	Hassanal Bolkiah National Stadium
	Volodymyr Pryyomov 49' 63'		Daniel Bennett 78'; Fahrudin Mustafic (red card) 59'; Yasir Hanapi (red card) 83'

29 September 2018 Round 24 (Rescheduled)	Tampines Rovers (Singapore)	1–1	(Singapore) Home United	Our Tampines Hub
	Khairul Amri 72' (pen.); Madhu Mohana (yellow card) 20'; Shameer Aziq (yellow card) 20'; Shah Shahiran (yellow card) 90+5'		Shahril Ishak 77'; Song Ui-Young (penalty missed) 95; Iqram Rifqi (yellow card) 40'; Abdil Qaiyyim (yellow card) 71'	Referee: Muhammad Taqi Aljaafari Bin Jahari (Singapore)

Pos	Team	Pld	W	D	L	GF	GA	GD	Pts	Qualification or relegation
2	Home United	24	12	7	5	48	36	+12	43	Qualification to AFC Champions League Preliminary Round 1
3	DPMM FC (Note: The two foreign clubs – Albirex Niigata (S) and DPMM FC – as well as the Football Association of Singapore (FAS) under-21 team, Young Lions, are ineligible for any AFC competition spots.)	24	11	8	5	46	38	+8	41	
4	Tampines Rovers	24	12	4	8	43	27	+16	40	Qualification to AFC Cup Group Stage
5	Warriors FC	24	7	7	10	32	35	−3	28	
6	Balestier Khalsa	24	7	6	11	25	36	−11	27	

Updated to match(es) played on 29 September 2018. Source: Singapore Premier League
Rules for classification: 1) points; 2) goal difference; 3) number of goals scored; 4) number of wins

=== AFC Champions League ===
Win Draw Loss

==== Qualifying play-off ====
16 January 2018 Preliminary round 1	Bali United (Indonesia)	3–1	(Singapore) Tampines Rovers	Bali
	Fadil Sausu 14'; Ilija Spasojević 61'; Hanis Saghara Putra 90+3'		Shannon Stephen 42'	Stadium: Kapten I Wayan Dipta Stadium; Referee: Hiroyuki Kimura, Japan

=== AFC Cup ===
Pos	Team	Pld	W	D	L	GF	GA	GD	Pts	Qualification	PSJ	SLN	JDT	TAM
1	(Indonesia) Persija Jakarta	6	4	1	1	13	6	+7	13	Zonal semi-finals	—	1–0	4–0	4–1
2	(Vietnam) Sông Lam Nghệ An	6	3	1	2	8	5	+3	10 (Note: Head-to-head results: Sông Lam Nghệ An 2–0 Johor Darul Ta'zim, Johor Darul Ta'zim 3–2 Sông Lam Nghệ An.)		0–0	—	2–0	2–1
3	(Malaysia) Johor Darul Ta'zim	6	3	1	2	8	9	−1	10		3–0	3–2	—	2–1
4	(Singapore) Tampines Rovers	6	0	1	5	5	14	−9	1		2–4	0–2	0–0	—

Source: AFC
Rules for classification: Group stage tiebreakers
Notes:

Win Draw Loss

==== Group Match ====
10 February 2018 Match Day 1	Tampines Rovers (Singapore)	0–2	(Vietnam) Sông Lam Nghệ An	Singapore
	Zulfadhmi Suzliman (yellow card) 53'; Fahrudin Mustafic (yellow card) 90+2'		Ho Phuc Tinh 49'; Ho Khac Ngoc 71'	Stadium: Jalan Besar Stadium; Attendance: 1,450; Referee: Mohammed Al-Hoish (Saudi Arabia)

28 February 2018 Match Day 2	Persija Jakarta (Indonesia)	4–1	(Singapore) Tampines Rovers	Jakarta
	Marko Šimić 12', 74', 86'; Rezaldi Hehanusa 41'		Khairul Amri 77'	Stadium: Gelora Bung Karno Stadium; Attendance: 49,056; Referee: Kim Woo-sung (South Korea)

6 March 2018 Match Day 3	Tampines Rovers (Singapore)	0–0	(Malaysia) Johor Darul Ta'zim	Singapore
	Safirul Sulaiman (yellow card) 25'; Khairul Amri (yellow card) 54'; Yasir Hanapi (yellow card) 69'		Nazmi Faiz Mansor (yellow card) 12'; Afiq Fazail (yellow card) 67'; Azrif Nasrulhaq (yellow card) 90'	Stadium: Jalan Besar Stadium; Attendance: 2,250; Referee: Hussein Abo Yehia (Lebanon)

14 March 2018 Match Day 4	Johor Darul Ta'zim (Malaysia)	2–1	(Singapore) Tampines Rovers	Johor
	Safawi Rasid 13'; Ahmad Hazwan 79' (yellow card) 66'; La'Vere Corbin-Ong (yellow card) 44'		Khairul Amri 45' (pen.); Fazrul Nawaz (yellow card) 78'	Stadium: Tan Sri Dato' Haji Hassan Yunos Stadium; Attendance: 8,750; Referee: Payam Heidary (Iran)

10 April 2018 Match Day 5	Sông Lam Nghệ An (Vietnam)	2–1	(Singapore) Tampines Rovers	Nghệ An
	Michael Olaha 16'; Hồ Tuấn Tàin 75'		Irfan Najeeb 38'	Stadium: Vinh Stadium; Referee: Yaqoub Al-Hammadi (UAE)

24 April 2018 Match Day 6	Tampines Rovers (Singapore)	2–4	(Indonesia) Persija Jakarta	Singapore
	Jordan Webb 27'; Fazrul Nawaz 80'		Rezaldi Hehanusa 23'; Marko Šimić 45+1'; Novri Setiawan 51'; Addison Alves 72'	Stadium: Jalan Besar Stadium; Referee: Rowan Arumughan (India)

=== Singapore Cup ===
Win Draw Loss

27 July 2018 Quarter Final 1st Leg	Home United (Singapore)	1–2	(Singapore) Tampines Rovers	Jalan Besar Stadium
	Shahril Ishak 61'		Khairul Amri 45+1'; Jordan Webb 85'; Yasir Hanapi (yellow card) 90' (yellow-red card)	Referee: Muhammad Taqi Aljaafari Bin Jahari, Singapore

19 September 2018 Quarter Final 2nd Leg	Tampines Rovers (Singapore)	1–3 (3–4 agg.)	(Singapore) Home United	Our Tampines Hub
	Khairul Amri 45'; Daniel Bennett (yellow card) 86'; Syazwan Buhari (red card) 90+4'		Song Ui-young 21'; Iqram Rifqi 34'; Shahril Ishak 71'; Izzdin Shafiq (yellow card) 83'	Referee: Nathan Chan, Singapore

Tampines Rovers lost 4–3 on aggregate.

== See also ==
- 2017 Tampines Rovers FC season
