= 2017 Tampines Rovers FC season =

Tampines Rovers FC
2017 season
- Chairman: (Singapore) Desmond Ong
- Coach: (Germany) Jürgen Raab
- Ground: Jurong West Stadium
- S.League: 2nd
- Singapore Cup: Quarter Finals knocked out by Albirex Niigata Singapore
- League Cup: Group Stage
Home colours	Away colours

The 2017 S.League season is Tampines Rovers's 22nd season at the top level of Singapore football and 72nd year in existence as a football club. The club will also compete in the Singapore League Cup, Singapore Cup, Singapore Community Shield and the AFC Cup.

== Key events ==
=== January ===
On 4/1/2017, Khairul Amri joined the Stag's club despite offers from Hougang United and Warriors FC.

On 7/1/2017, Hafiz Sujad left the club to join Thailand League 2 club, BBCU FC.

On 13/1/2017, it is reported that Daniel Bennett had crossed over from the Stags' fierce rival, Geylang International for the new season after his contract is not renewed at the end of the 2016 season.

On 24/1/2017, Tampines Rovers' AFC Champions League dreams were dashed after they were beaten 2–0 by Global FC from the Philippines.

On 27/1/2017, coach, Akbar Nawas parted ways with the Stag after it was reported that they had been looking at various options since the end of 2016 season.

=== February ===
On 1/2/2017, Jurgen Raab was announced as the new coach for the team, signing a 3 years contract.

On 8/2/2017, it was reported that Sahil Suhaimi will sign for the team but only play in the AFC Cup competition.

On 10/2/2017, Singaporean-American, Raspreet Sandhu from Sonoma State University signed for the club to play in the AFC Cup.

On 21/2/2017, the Stags kicked off their AFC Cup campaign with a 2–1 win against Felda United.

On 26/2/2017, Stags failed to stop Albirex Niigata (S) from winning their 5th consecutive title, the Charity Shield.

=== March ===
On 3/3/2017, the Stags won their 1st match of the 2017 Sleague season by beating Hougang United 2–1.

On 6/3/2017, it was reported that some of the players were not pay on time, sparkling fears of money issue the club faced in 2016.

On 7/3/2017, the club lost 5–0 in Philippines to Ceres Negro. This is a landmark victory for a Philippines club in their AFC Cup history.

On 14/3/2017, 7 Stags were called up to the National Team for the matches against Afghanistan & Bahrain. The 7 players were Izwan Mahbud, Shakir Hamzah, Madhu Mohana, Daniel Bennett, Mustafic Fahrudin, Yasir Hanapi & Khairul Amri.

On 15/3/2017, another trashing in the AFC Cup for the Stags against Hanoi FC. They lost 4–0 in Hanoi.

On 16/3/2017, captain Madhu Mohana was handed a suspended $1,000 fine for his comments on social media directed at referee Sukhbir Singh after they lost to Albirex in the Charity Shield.

=== April ===
On 4/4/2017, the Stags concede a last minute goal to Hanoi to lost their 3rd consecutive match in the continental tournament.

On 8/4/2017, it was announced that Sahil Suhaimi who was only registered for the AFC Cup will be joining English Premier League club Burnley FC for a month-long training stint.

=== May ===
On 3/5/2017, the team was knocked out of the AFC Cup competition after failing to win their last group match against Ceres Negro FC.

On 12/5/2017, the Stags beat the unbeaten Protectors by 3–2 to go to #2 in the table.

On 16/5/2017, long term injured player, Fazrul Nawaz announced that has set a target of June for his full comeback after making his return to national training on 15/5/2017 following an eight-month absence.

=== June ===
On 21/6/2017, Tampines chairman Krishna Ramachandra announced he is stepping down from duty after 19months in-charge.

=== July ===
On 28/7/2017, the team returned to Tampines for their home game. The 1st home game after years away is against Brunei DPMM.

=== September ===
On 7/9/2017, Desmond Ong is appointed as the new chairman of the club.

== Squad ==
=== Sleague Squad ===
As of 4 May 2017.

No.	Name	Nationality	Date of Birth (Age)	Last club	Contract Since	Contract End
Goalkeepers
1	Izwan Mahbud	(Singapore)	14 July 1990 (age 36)	(Singapore) LionsXII	2016	
21	Joey Sim	(Singapore)	2 March 1987 (age 39)	(Singapore) Geylang International	2015	
24	Haikal Hasnol	(Singapore)	4 November 1995 (age 31)	Youth Team	2017	
Defenders
2	Ismadi Mukhtar	(Singapore)	16 December 1983 (age 42)	(Singapore) Woodlands Wellington	2010	
3	Jufri Taha	(Singapore)	4 March 1985 (age 41)	(Singapore) Balestier Khalsa	2010	
4	Fahrudin Mustafic	(Singapore) (Serbia)	17 April 1981 (age 45)	(Indonesia) Persela Lamongan	2011	
6	Madhu Mohana	(Singapore)	6 March 1991 (age 35)	(Singapore) Warriors FC	2017	2017
11	Shakir Hamzah	(Singapore)	10 October 1992 (age 34)	(Singapore) LionsXII	2016	2017
12	Shannon Stephen	(Singapore)	2 June 1994 (age 32)	(Singapore) Young Lions FC	2017	
15	Imran Sahib	(Singapore)	12 October 1982 (age 44)	(Singapore) Gymkhana FC (IWL Club)	2017	2017
16	Daniel Bennett	(Singapore) (England)	7 January 1978 (age 48)	(Singapore) Geylang International	2017	2017
22	Ehvin Sasidharan	(Singapore)	14 February 1996 (age 30)	(Singapore) Young Lions FC	2017	2017
25	Irwan Shah	(Singapore)	2 November 1988 (age 38)	(Singapore) Warriors FC	2016	
Midfielders
7	Son Yong Chan	(South Korea)	15 April 1991 (age 35)	(Philippines) Ceres–Negros F.C.	2017	2017
8	Shahdan Sulaiman	(Singapore)	9 May 1988 (age 38)	(Singapore) LionsXII	2016	2017
9	Ryutaro Megumi	(Japan)	29 June 1993 (age 33)	(Japan) Aoyama Gakuin University	2017	2017
13	Amirul Haziq	(Singapore)	30 October 1994 (age 32)	Singapore Cubs	2017	2017
14	Fazli Ayob	(Singapore)	24 January 1990 (age 36)	(Singapore) Balestier Khalsa	2017	
17	Jamil Ali	(Singapore)	2 May 1984 (age 42)	(Singapore) Balestier Khalsa	2017	
18	Hafiz Sujad	(Singapore)	1 November 1990 (age 36)	(Thailand) BBCU F.C.	2017	
Forwards
10	Fazrul Nawaz	(Singapore)	17 April 1985 (age 41)	(Singapore) Warriors FC	2016	
19	Khairul Amri	(Singapore)	14 March 1985 (age 41)	(Singapore) Young Lions	2017	2018
20	Ivan Jakov Džoni	(Croatia)	25 July 1994 (age 32)	(Slovakia) FK Dukla Banská Bystrica	2017	2017
21	Hafiz Rahim	(Singapore)	19 November 1983 (age 42)	(Singapore) Warriors FC	2017	

=== Prime League Squad ===
As of 3 January 2017.

No.	Name	Nationality	Position (s)	Date of Birth (Age)	Last club	Contract Since	Contract End
Midfielders
26	Noor Hilman	(Singapore)	MF		Youth Team		
30	Aide Shazwandi	(Singapore)	MF		(Singapore) NFA U17		
42	Andi Agus Salam Kahar	(Singapore)	MF		(Singapore) Geylang International Prime League		
47	Zulfadhmi Suzliman	(Singapore)	MF		(Singapore) Young Lions		
Forwards
27	Faizal Raffi	(Singapore)	FW		(Singapore) Balestier Khalsa Prime League		
28	Diego Silvas	(United States)	FW	25 September 1997 (age 29)	(United States) Seattle Sounders FC	2016	
35	Haiqal Sulaiman	(Singapore)	FW		Youth Team		

== Coaching staff ==
Position	Name	Ref.
Head Coach	(Germany) Jürgen Raab	
Assistant Coach	(Singapore) Herman Zailani	
Goalkeeping Coach	(Singapore) Rameshpal Singh	
Team Manager	(Singapore) Desmund Khusnin	
Physiotherapist		
Kitman	(Singapore) Goh Koon Hiang	
Director of Football	(Singapore) Jita Singh	

== Transfers ==
=== Pre-season transfers ===
==== In ====
Position	Player	Transferred From	Ref
DF	(Singapore) Madhu Mohana	(Singapore) Warriors	
DF	(Singapore) Imran Sahib	(Singapore) Gymkhana FC (IWL Club)	
DF	(Singapore) Firman Hanif	(Singapore) Siglap FC (NFL Club)	
DF	(Singapore) Daniel Bennett	(Singapore) Geylang International	
DF	(Singapore) Farhan Rahmat	(Singapore) Siglap FC (NFL Club)	
MF	(Singapore) Jamil Ali	(Singapore) Balestier Khalsa	
MF	(Singapore) Fazli Ayob	(Singapore) Balestier Khalsa	
MF	(South Korea) Son Yong Chan	(Philippines) Ceres Negros	
MF	(Japan) Ryutaro Megumi	(Japan) Aoyama Gakuin University	
MF	(United States) Raspreet Sandhu	(United States) Sonoma State University	
MF	(Singapore) Zulfadhmi Suzliman	(Singapore) Young Lions	(To Prime League)
FW	(Singapore) Khairul Amri	(Singapore) Young Lions	
FW	(Croatia) Ivan Jakov Džoni	(Slovakia) Dukla Banská Bystrica	
FW	(Singapore) Sahil Suhaimi	(Singapore) Geylang International	

==== Out ====
Position	Player	Transferred To	Ref
GK	(Singapore) Ahmad Fadly	(Singapore) Hougang United Prime League	
DF	(Singapore) Hafiz Sujad	(Thailand) BBCU	
DF	(Singapore) Afiq Yunos	(Singapore) Home United	
DF	(Singapore) Noh Rahman	Retire	
MF	(Singapore) Nawari Ahmad	(Singapore) Gymkhana FC (NFL Club)	
MF	(Singapore) Fabian Kwok	(Singapore) Hougang United	
MF	(Canada) Jordan Webb	(Singapore) Warriors	
MF	(England) Jermaine Pennant	(England) Bury FC	
MF	(Singapore) Izzdin Shafiq	(Singapore) Home United	
MF	(Singapore) Firman Hanif	(Singapore) Yishun Sentek Mariners FC	
FW	(Republic of Ireland) Billy Mehmet	Brunei DPMM	
FW	(Singapore) Sufian Anuar	Released	

=== Mid-season transfers ===
==== In ====
Position	Player	Transferred From	Ref
DF	(Singapore) Ehvin Sasidharan	(Singapore) Young Lions FC	
DF	(Singapore) Shannon Stephen		
MF	(Singapore) Hafiz Sujad	(Thailand) BBCU F.C.	

==== Out ====
Position	Player	Transferred To	Ref
MF	(Singapore) Yasir Hanapi	(Malaysia) PDRM FA	
MF	(Singapore) Farhan Rahmat		
FW	(Singapore) Sahil Suhaimi	(Malaysia) Sarawak FA	

=== Trial ===
Position	Player	From	Ref
FW	(Australia) (Iran) Hossein Ellahi	(United States) Seattle Sounders FC Academy	
DF	(Singapore) Shannon Stephen	(Singapore) Young Lions	

== Friendlies ==
=== Pre-season friendlies ===
Win Draw Loss

10 January 2017 Pre-Season Friendly	Tampines Rovers (Singapore)	1–4	(Malaysia) Pahang FC	Jurong West Stadium
	Ivan Džoni – 34mins (P)		Julius Oiboh – 21min, 66min Mohamadou Sumareh – 23mins Ashari Samsudin – 62min

14 January 2017 Pre-Season Friendly	Terengganu (Malaysia)	2–2	(Singapore) Tampines Rovers	Sultan Mizan Zainal Abidin Stadium
	Federico Falcone; Lutfulla Turaev		Irwan Shah; Ryutaro Megumi

16 January 2017 Pre-Season Friendly	T-Team (Malaysia)	2–1	(Singapore) Tampines Rovers	Sultan Ismail Nasiruddin Shah Stadium
	Abdoulaye Maïga-34m; Ahmad Takhiyuddin-75m		Ivan Džoni-45m

=== In Season Friendlies ===
7 June 2017 Friendly	Tampines Rovers (Singapore)	3–1	(Singapore) Kembangan United (NFL Club)	Meridan JC

== Team statistics ==
=== Appearances and goals ===
No.	Pos.	Player	Sleague		Singapore Cup		League Cup		AFC Cup		Total	
No.	Pos.	Player	Apps.	Goals	Apps.	Goals	Apps.	Goals	Apps.	Goals	Apps.	Goals
1	GK	(Singapore) Izwan Mahbud	17	0	2	0	0	0	7	0	26	0
2	DF	(Singapore) Ismadi Mukhtar	11(3)	0	1	0	2	0	4(2)	0	23	0
3	DF	(Singapore) Jufri Taha	9(6)	0	0	0	3	0	3(2)	0	23	0
4	DF	(Singapore) Fahrudin Mustafic (captain)	24	1	1	0	0	0	5	0	30	1
6	DF	(Singapore) Madhu Mohana (captain)	15(2)	1	2	0	0	0	5(1)	0	25	1
7	MF	(South Korea) Son Yong Chan	20(1)	1	2	0	0	0	7	1	30	2
8	MF	(Singapore) Shahdan Sulaiman	21	5	2	1	0	0	3(1)	0	27	6
9	MF	(Japan) Ryutaro Megumi	23	7	2	0	0	0	7	0	32	7
10	FW	(Singapore) Fazrul Nawaz	7(4)	3	2	0	3	0	0	0	16	3
11	DF	(Singapore) Shakir Hamzah	9(1)	2	2	0	0	0	4	0	16	2
12	DF	(Singapore) Shannon Stephen	6(1)	3	0	0	0	0	0	0	7	3
13	MF	(Singapore) Amirul Haziq	1(1)	0	0	0	2	0	0	0	4	0
14	MF	(Singapore) Fazli Ayob	10(6)	5	0	0	2(1)	1	2(1)	0	22	6
15	DF	(Singapore) Imran Sahib	6	0	0	0	0	0	0	0	6	0
16	DF	(Singapore) Daniel Bennett	23	2	2	0	0	0	7	0	32	2
17	MF	(Singapore) Jamil Ali	0(7)	1	0(1)	0	1(1)	1	0(3)	1	13	3
18	MF	(Singapore) Hafiz Abu Sujad	12(1)	2	2	0	3	0	0	0	18	2
19	FW	(Singapore) Khairul Amri	9(5)	6	1(1)	0	0	0	3(3)	3	22	9
20	FW	(Croatia) Ivan Džoni	11(7)	7	0(2)	0	0	0	6	1	26	8
21	FW	(Singapore) Hafiz Rahim	2(6)	0	0	0	3	0	1(1)	0	13	0
22	DF	(Singapore) Ehvin Sasidharan	0	0	0	0	1(2)	0	0	0	3	0
23	GK	(Singapore) Joey Sim	2(1)	0	0	0	3	0	0	0	6	0
24	GK	(Singapore) Haikal Hasnol	4	0	0	0	0	0	0	0	4	0
25	DF	(Singapore) Irwan Shah	12(4)	1	1(1)	0	2	0	3(2)	0	25	1
27	FW	(Singapore) Faizal Raffi	0(4)	0	0(1)	0	3	0	0	0	8	0
29	FW	(United States) Diego Silvas	1(2)	0	0	0	0	0	0	0	3	0
30	MF	(Singapore) Aide Shazwandi	0(1)	0	0	0	0(1)	0	0	0	2	0
31	MF	(Singapore) Khairul Nizam	0	0	0	0	1(2)	0	0	0	3	0
32	MF	(Singapore) Danish Uwais	0	0	0	0	2	0	0	0	2	0
42	MF	(Singapore) Andi Agus Salam Kahar	0	0	0	0	1(1)	0	0	0	2	0
47	MF	(Singapore) Zulfadmi Suzliman	0(6)	0	0	0	0	0	0	0	6	0
Players who have played this season but had left the club or on loan to other club
12	MF	(United States) Raspreet Sandhu	0	0	0	0	0	0	2(1)	0	3	0
18	MF	(Singapore) Yasir Hanapi	8(1)	2	0	0	0	0	7	3	16	5
22	DF	(Singapore) Farhan Rahmat	0	0	0	0	0	0	0	0	0	0
32	MF	(Singapore) Sahil Suhaimi	0	0	0	0	0	0	2(2)	0	4	0
	MF	(Singapore) Firman Hanif	0	0	0	0	0	0	0	0	0	0

== Competitions ==
=== Overview ===
Competition	Record							
Competition	P	W	D	L	GF	GA	GD	Win %
S.League	24	17	3	4	48	20	+28	70.83
AFC Cup	6	2	0	4	8	17	−9	33.33
Singapore Cup	2	0	0	2	1	7	−6	0.00
League Cup	3	0	0	3	2	12	−10	0.00
Total	35	19	3	13	59	56	+3	54.29

=== S.League ===
Win Draw Loss

26 February 2017 Round 1	Albirex Niigata (S) (Singapore)	2–1	(Singapore) Tampines Rovers	Kallang
	Shoichiro Sakamoto 74', 82'	Report	Ryutaro Megumi 36' (yellow card) 84'; Ivan Jakov Džoni (penalty missed) 60; Madhu Mohana (yellow card) 24' (red card) 88'; Daniel Bennett (yellow card) 57'; Yasir Hanapi (yellow card) 49, 64' (yellow-red card); Son Yong Chan (yellow card) 90'; Ismadi Mukhtar (red card) 90'	Stadium: National Stadium, Singapore; Attendance: 15,480; Referee: Sukhbir Singh

3 March 2017 Round 2	Tampines Rovers (Singapore)	2–1	(Singapore) Hougang United	Jalan Besar Stadium
	Ivan Džoni 29' (pen.); Khairul Amri 61'; Irwan Shah (yellow card) 84'		Fumiya Kogure 90' (pen.); Zulfahmi Arifin (yellow card) 7'; Syahiran Miswan (yellow card) 33'	Attendance: 1,585; Referee: Muhammad Taqi Aljaafari Bin Jahari

11 March 2017 Round 3	Balestier Khalsa (Singapore)	0–1	(Singapore) Tampines Rovers	Toa Payoh Stadium
	Fadli Kamis (yellow card) 46'; Aung Kyaw Naing (yellow card) 48'; Sheikh Abdul Hadi (red card) 90'		Ivan Džoni 50' (penalty missed) 75 (yellow card) 81'; Son Yong Chan (yellow card) 40'; Jamil Ali (yellow card) 75' (red card) 90'	Attendance: 950; Referee: Nathan Chan

1 April 2017 Round 4	Tampines Rovers (Singapore)	0–1	(Singapore) Warriors FC	Jurong West Stadium
	Ismadi Mukhtar (yellow card) 42'	Report	Jordan Webb 28'; Baihakki Khaizan (yellow card) 22'; Hafiz Osman (yellow card) 45'	Referee: G Letchman

8 April 2017 Round 5	Geylang International (Singapore)	0–4	(Singapore) Tampines Rovers	Jalan Besar Stadium
			Ryutaro Megumi 35', 90'; Yasir Hanapi 61', 81'; Son Yong Chan (yellow card) 23'; Jufri Taha (yellow card) 89'	Attendance: 1,552; Referee: Jansen Foo

23 April 2017 Round 6	Tampines Rovers (Singapore)	1–0	(Singapore) Young Lions FC	Jurong West Stadium
	Khairul Amri 90+4' (yellow card) 90' (yellow card) 90+4' (yellow-red card); Son Yong Chan (yellow card) 33'; Daniel Bennett (yellow card) 76'; Shahdan Sulaiman (yellow card) 83'; Zulfadmi Suzliman (yellow card) 88'		Muhelmy Suhaimi (yellow card) 61'	Referee: Jansen Foo

28 April 2017 Round 7	Brunei DPMM	0–1	(Singapore) Tampines Rovers	Sultan Hassanal Bolkiah Stadium
	Maududi Hilmi Kasmi (yellow card) 39'; Yura Indera Putera Yunos (yellow card) 56'; Helmi Zambin (yellow card) 71'		Ivan Džoni 3'	Referee: Muhd Taqi

12 May 2017 Round 8	Tampines Rovers (Singapore)	3–2	(Singapore) Home United	Jalan Besar Stadium
	Khairul Amri 31'; Shakir Hamzah 41'; Daniel Bennett 44'; Fazli Ayob (yellow card) 18'; Son Yong Chan (yellow card) 62'; Yasir Hanapi (yellow card) 67'; Shakir Hamzah (yellow card) 85'; Zulfadmi Suzliman (yellow card) 90'		Amiruldin Asraf 13' 82'; Song Ui-young (yellow card) 17'; Shamil Sharif (yellow card) 89'	Attendance: 1,223; Referee: G Letchman

21 May 2017 Round 9	Tampines Rovers (Singapore)	1–4	(Singapore) Albirex Niigata (S)	Jurong West Stadium
	Son Yong Chan 71'; Shahdan Sulaiman (yellow card) 29'; Shakir Hamzah (yellow card) 43' (yellow card) 53' (yellow-red card); Fazli Ayob (yellow card) 50'		Naofumi Tanaka 27' 90'; Tsubasa Sano 47' (pen.) 78'; Shoichiro Sakamoto (yellow card) 53'	Attendance: 1,052; Referee: Nathan Chan

25 May 2017 Round 10	Hougang United (Singapore)	0–3	(Singapore) Tampines Rovers	Hougang Stadium
	Syukri Bashir (yellow card) 79'		Khairul Amri 58' (yellow card) 36'; Madhu Mohana 85'; Jamil Ali 90'	Attendance: 832; Referee: Sukhbir Singh

17 June 2017 Round 11	Tampines Rovers (Singapore)	3–1	(Singapore) Balestier Khalsa	Jurong West Stadium
	Fazli Ayob 38' (yellow card) 29'; Ryutaro Megumi 41'; Ivan Džoni 49'		Fadli Kamis 82'; Raihan Rahman (yellow card) 46'; Huzaifah Aziz (yellow card) 57'	Attendance: 986; Referee: Jansen Foo

22 June 2017 Round 11	Warriors FC (Singapore)	0–1	(Singapore) Tampines Rovers	Choa Chu Kang Stadium
	Fazli Jaffar (yellow card) 40'; Zulfadli Zainal Abidin (yellow card) 82'		Shahdan Sulaiman 83' (pen.); Fazli Ayob (yellow card) 59'	Attendance: 1,528; Referee: G Letchman

29 June 2017 Round 13	Tampines Rovers (Singapore)	1–1	(Singapore) Geylang International	Jurong West Stadium
	Fazrul Nawaz 54'; Son Yong Chan (yellow card) 42'; Shakir Hamzah (yellow card) 89'		Ricardo Sendra 85'; Víctor Coto (yellow card) 42'	Attendance: 806; Referee: Muhd Taqi

28 July 2017 Round 14	Tampines Rovers (Singapore)	2–0	Brunei DPMM	Tampines Hub
	Shakir Hamzah 28'; Shahdan Sulaiman 83' (pen.); Fazrul Nawaz (yellow card) 79'		Hazwan Hamzah (yellow card) 53'; Vincent Reyes (yellow card) 85'	Attendance: 4,676; Referee: Muhd Syahir

23 October 2017 Round 15 (Rescheduled)	Home United (Singapore)	0–2	(Singapore) Tampines Rovers	Bishan Stadium
	Irfan Fandi (yellow card) 65'; Stipe Plazibat (yellow card) 80'; Abdil Qaiyyim (yellow card) 90'		Ryutaro Megumi 13', 55'; Irwan Shah (yellow card) 40'	Referee: G Letchman

19 August 2017 Round 16	Albirex Niigata (S) (Singapore)	4–0	(Singapore) Tampines Rovers	Jurong East Stadium
	Kento Nagasaki 12'; Ryota Nakai 16', 83'; Yasutaka Yanagi 22'		Fahrudin Mustafic (yellow card) 30'	Attendance: 1,202; Referee: Nathan Chan

9 September 2017 Round 17	Tampines Rovers (Singapore)	5–1	(Singapore) Hougang United	Our Tampines Hub
	Shahdan Sulaiman 12' (pen.) 54' (pen.); Irwan Shah 45'; Ryutaro Megumi 65'; Fazli Ayob 90'; Ismadi Mukhtar (yellow card) 79'		Fareez Farhan 4'; Lionel Tan (yellow card) 11'; Faiz Salleh (yellow card) 66'	Attendance: 1,521; Referee: Sukhbir Singh

12 September 2017 Round 18	Young Lions FC (Singapore)	0–4	(Singapore) Tampines Rovers	Jalan Besar Stadium
	Haiqal Pashia (yellow card) 47'; Muhaimin Suhaimi (yellow card) 72'		Shannon Stephen 16', 58' (yellow card) 50'; Ivan Jakov Džoni 37', 78' (yellow card) 72'	Attendance: 1,323; Referee: G Letchman

17 September 2017 Round 19	Balestier Khalsa (Singapore)	0–1	(Singapore) Tampines Rovers	Toa Payoh Stadium
			Fazrul Nawaz 53'	Attendance: 864; Referee: Muhd Syahir

20 September 2017 Round 20	Tampines Rovers (Singapore)	1–1	(Singapore) Warriors FC	Jurong West Stadium
	Hafiz Abu Sujad 15'; Fahrudin Mustafic (yellow card) 90'		Shahril Ishak 57' (pen.) (yellow card) 45'; Baihakki Khaizan (yellow card) 64'; Hafiz Nor (yellow card) 72'; Syaqir Sulaiman (yellow card) 90'	Attendance: 1,325; Referee: W Ravisanthiran

15 October 2017 Round 21 (Rescheduled)	Geylang International (Singapore)	2–3	(Singapore) Tampines Rovers	Our Tampines Hub
	Shawal Anuar 8'; Yuki Ichikawa 47'; Ricardo Sendra (yellow card) 69'; Al-Qaasimy Rahman (yellow card) 90'		Fahrudin Mustafic 38'; Fazrul Nawaz 72'; Fazli Ayob 90'; Madhu Mohana (yellow card) 44'; Fazli Ayob (yellow card) 90'; Khairul Amri (yellow card) 90'; Ismadi Mukhtar (red card) 87'	Referee: Farhad Mohamed

28 October 2017 Round 22	Tampines Rovers (Singapore)	3–0	(Singapore) Young Lions FC	Our Tampines Hub
	Shannon Stephen 8'; Hafiz Abu Sujad 77'; Daniel Bennett 82'			Referee: Jansen Foo

3 November 2017 Round 23	Brunei DPMM	0–5	(Singapore) Tampines Rovers	Hassanal Bolkiah National Stadium
			Shahdan Sulaiman 21'; Hazwan Hamzah 36' (o.g.); Khairul Amri 45', 66'; Ivan Dzonin 80'; Fazli Ayob (yellow card) 47'	Referee: Muhd Syahir

18 November 2017 Round 24	Tampines Rovers (Singapore)	0–0	(Singapore) Home United	Our Tampines Hub
	Shannon Stephen (yellow card) 47'; Madhu Mohana (yellow card) 73'; Ismadi Mukhtar (yellow card) 85'; Son Yong Chan (yellow card) 87'		Faris Ramli (yellow card) 37'; Stipe Plazibat (yellow card) 52'	Referee: G Letchman

Pos	Team	Pld	W	D	L	GF	GA	GD	Pts	Qualification
1	(Japan) Albirex Niigata (S) (Note: The two foreign clubs – Albirex Niigata (S) and DPMM FC – as well as the Football Association of Singapore (FAS) under-21 team, Young Lions, are not eligible for any AFC competition spots.) (C)	24	20	2	2	70	16	+54	62	
2	Tampines Rovers	24	17	3	4	48	20	+28	54	Qualification to AFC Champions League Preliminary Round 1 or AFC Cup Group Stage
3	Home United	24	15	5	4	58	26	+32	50	Qualification to AFC Cup Group Stage
4	Geylang International	24	11	3	10	32	37	−5	36	
5	Warriors FC	24	9	7	8	33	36	−3	34	

Source: S.League
Rules for classification: 1) points; 2) goal difference; 3) number of goals scored; 4) number of wins
(C) Champions

=== Singapore Cup ===
==== Quarter-final ====
Win Draw Loss

10 August 2017 Quarter Final Leg 1	Tampines Rovers (Singapore)	1–5	(Singapore) Albirex Niigata (S)	Tampines Hub
	Shahdan Sulaiman 90+2' (pen.); Son Yong Chan (yellow card) 48'; Fahrudin Mustafic (yellow card) 51'		Kento Nagasaki 26', 59'; Rui Kumada 33'; Shoma Kondo 83'; Shoichiro Sakamoto 84'; Naofumi Tanaka (yellow card) 80'; Koki Sato (yellow card) 81'; Takuya Akiyama (yellow card) 90+1'	Referee: Farhad Mohamed

13 August 2017 Quarter Final Leg 2	Albirex Niigata (S) (Singapore)	2–0	(Singapore) Tampines Rovers	Jurong East Stadium
	Naofumi Tanaka 30'; Ryuya Motoda 45'			Referee: Jansen Foo

Tampines Rovers lost 1–7 on aggregate.

=== Singapore TNP League Cup ===
Pos	Team	Pld	W	D	L	GF	GA	GD	Pts	Qualification
1	(Brunei) DPMM FC	3	2	1	0	11	4	+7	7	Advance to semi-final
2	Geylang International	3	2	1	0	9	4	+5	7	Advance to semi-final
3	Balestier Khalsa	3	1	0	2	3	5	−2	3	
4	Tampines Rovers	3	0	0	3	2	12	−10	0	

Source: S.League

Win Draw Loss

8 July 2017 Group Stage M1	Tampines Rovers (Singapore)	1–5	Brunei DPMM	Jalan Besar Stadium
	Jamil Ali 67'; Syed Haziq (yellow card) 70'; Fazli Ayob (yellow card) 73'		Adi Said 14'; Hafiz 31' (o.g.); Maududi Hilmi Kasmi 41'; Azwan Ali 41'; Shahrazen Said 48' (yellow card) 12'; Najib Tarif (yellow card) 87'	Referee: Jansen Foo

11 July 2017 Group Stage M2	Tampines Rovers (Singapore)	1–4	(Singapore) Geylang International	Jurong West Stadium
	Fazli Ayob 63'; Ismadi Mukhtar (yellow card) 90'		Ifwat Ismail 53' 64' 85'; Amy Recha 69'	Referee: Ahmad A'Qashah

14 July 2017 Group Stage M3	Balestier Khalsa (Singapore)	3–0	(Singapore) Tampines Rovers	Toa Payoh Stadium
	Fadli Kamis 30'; Hazzuwan Halim 56'; Aung Kyaw Naing 86'		Jufri Taha (yellow card) 66'; Jamli Ali (yellow card) 70'; Ehvin Sasidharan (yellow card) 88'	Referee: W Ravisanthiran

=== AFC Champions League ===
Win Draw Loss

==== Qualifying play-off ====
24 January 2017 Preliminary round 1	Global (Philippines)	2–0	(Singapore) Tampines Rovers	Manila
	Ahamad Azzawi 59'; Misagh Bahadoran 73'		Khairul Amri (penalty missed)	Stadium: Rizal Memorial Stadium, Manila; Attendance: 1120; Referee: Liu Kwok Man (Hong Kong)

=== AFC Cup ===
==== Group stage ====
Pos	Team	Pld	W	D	L	GF	GA	GD	Pts	Qualification	CER	HAN	TAM	FEL
1	(Philippines) Ceres–Negros	6	3	2	1	16	8	+8	11 (Note: Head-to-head results: Hà Nội 1–1 Ceres–Negros, Ceres–Negros 6–2 Hà Nội.)	Zonal semi-finals	—	6–2	5–0	0–0
2	(Vietnam) Hà Nội	6	3	2	1	14	10	+4	11		1–1	—	4–0	4–1
3	(Singapore) Tampines Rovers	6	2	0	4	8	17	−9	6		2–4	1–2	—	2–1
4	(Malaysia) FELDA United	6	1	2	3	7	10	−3	5		3–0	1–1	1–3	—

Source: AFC
Rules for classification: Group stage tiebreakers
Notes:

Win Draw Loss

21 February 2017 Match Day 1	Tampines Rovers (Singapore)	2–1	(Malaysia) Felda United	Singapore
	Son Yong Chan 64'; Khairul Amri 83'; Izwan Mahbud (yellow card) 90+3'	Report	Fazrul Hazli 86'; Ridzuan Abdunloh (yellow card) 39'; Farizal Harun (yellow card) 41'; Shukor Adan (yellow card) 52'; Lucas Cano (yellow card) 90'	Stadium: Jalan Besar Stadium; Attendance: 1,277; Referee: Takuto Okabe (Japan); Man of the Match: Son Yong Chan

7 March 2017 Match Day 2	Ceres–Negros (Philippines)	5–0	(Singapore) Tampines Rovers	Bacolod
	Iain Ramsay 1'; Bienvenido Marañón 24', 64'; Manuel Ott 38'; Fernando Rodríguez 72'		Son Yong Chan (yellow card) 86'	Stadium: Panaad Stadium; Attendance: 8,000; Referee: Kim Woo-Sung (Korea)

15 March 2017 Match Day 3	Hà Nội T&T (Vietnam)	4–0	(Singapore) Tampines Rovers	Hanoi
	Loris Arnaud 16'; Nguyễn Văn Quyết 65'; Đỗ Hùng Dũng 89'; Gonzalo Marronkle 90+3' (pen.)			Stadium: Hàng Đẫy Stadium; Attendance: 2,600; Referee: Mooud Bonyadifar (Iran)

5 April 2017 Match Day 4	Tampines Rovers (Singapore)	1–2	(Vietnam) Hà Nội T&T	Singapore
	Yasir Hanapi 68'; Sahil Suhaimi (yellow card) 74'	Report	Nguyễn Văn Quyết 75'; Phạm Văn Thành 90+2'	Stadium: Jalan Besar Stadium; Attendance: 1,565; Referee: Mohammad Hasan Mahmoud Arafah (Jordan); Man of the Match: Nguyễn Văn Quyết

19 April 2017 Match Day 5	Felda United (Malaysia)	1–3	(Singapore) Tampines Rovers	Selangor
	Norshahrul Idlan 51' (yellow card) 41'; Mootaz El Jounaidi (yellow card) 22'; Shukor Adan (yellow card) 84'		Ivan Džoni 29'; Khairul Amri 68', 72'	Stadium: Selayang Stadium; Attendance: 2,252; Referee: Lau Fong Hei (Hong Kong); Man of the Match: Khairul Amri

3 May 2017 Match Day 6	Tampines Rovers (Singapore)	2–4	(Philippines) Ceres–Negros	Singapore
	Yasir Hanapi 25' 60' (pen.); Son Yong Chan (yellow card) 15'; Shakir Hamzah (red card) 27'; Fahrudin Mustafić (yellow card) 36'; Ismadi Mukhtar (yellow card) 44'	Report	Bienvenido Marañón 6' 23'; Fernando 45' (pen.) (yellow card) 31'; Kota Kawase 66'; Martin Steuble (yellow card) 70'	Stadium: Jalan Besar Stadium; Attendance: 856; Referee: Masoud Tufayelieh (Syria); Man of the Match: Bienvenido Marañón
