= 2019 Tampines Rovers FC season =

Tampines Rovers FC
2019 season
- Chairman: (Singapore) Desmond Ong
- Coach: (Singapore) Gavin Lee
- Ground: Our Tampines Hub
- Top goalscorer: League: Jordan Webb; All: Jordan Webb
Home colours	Away colours

The 2019 Singapore Premier League season was Tampines Rovers's 24th season at the top level of Singapore football and 74th year in existence as a football club. The club competed in the Singapore League Cup, Singapore Cup, Singapore Community Shield and the AFC Cup.

Tampines Rovers were second placed in the Singapore Premier League and won the Singapore Cup, defeating Warriors FC in a 4–3 victory in the final. Tampines Rovers was equal in points with Hanoi FC at the top of the table at the group stage in the AFC Cup but was second placed due to a lower goal difference and failed to proceed beyond the group stage.

== Squad ==
=== Singapore Premier League Squad ===
As of 22 April 2018

No.	Name	Nationality	Date of birth (age)	Last club	Contract since	Contract end
Goalkeepers
1	Zulfairuuz Rudy	(Singapore)	22 May 1994 (age 32)	(Singapore) Hougang United	2019	2019
24	Syazwan Buhari	(Singapore)	22 September 1992 (age 34)	(Singapore) Geylang International	2018	2019
25	Zephen-Sean ^{U23}	(Singapore)	10 February 1998 (age 28)	Youth Team	2019	2019
Defenders
2	Shannon Stephen	(Singapore)	6 February 1994 (age 32)	(Singapore) Young Lions FC	2017	2020
3	Zakri Ee Kai Ren ^{U23}	(Singapore)	20 November 2000 (age 25)	(Singapore) NFA U18	2019	2019
4	Akmal Azman ^{U23}	(Singapore)	21 November 2000 (age 25)	(Singapore) NFA U18	2019	2019
5	Amirul Adli ^{U23}	(Singapore)	13 January 1996 (age 30)	(Singapore) Young Lions FC	2018	2020
6	Madhu Mohana	(Singapore)	6 March 1991 (age 35)	(Malaysia) Negeri Sembilan FA	2018	2019
16	Daniel Bennett ^{>30}	(Singapore) (England)	7 January 1978 (age 48)	(Singapore) Geylang International	2017	2019
17	Irwan Shah ^{>30}	(Singapore)	2 November 1988 (age 37)	(Singapore) Warriors FC	2016	2019
Midfielders
7	Zulfadhmi Suzliman ^{U23}	(Singapore)	10 February 1996 (age 30)	Youth Team	2017	2020
8	Shahdan Sulaiman ^{>30}	(Singapore)	9 May 1988 (age 38)	(Malaysia) Melaka United	2016	2020
11	Safirul Sulaiman	(Singapore)	12 October 1992 (age 34)	(Singapore) Geylang International	2018	2019
12	Joel Chew Joon Herng ^{U23}	(Singapore)	9 February 2000 (age 26)	(Singapore) NFA U18	2019	2019
15	Shah Shahiran ^{U23}	(Singapore)	14 November 1999 (age 26)	(Singapore) NFA U18	2018	2019
18	Yasir Hanapi	(Singapore)	21 June 1989 (age 37)	(Malaysia) PDRM FA	2018	2020
23	Zehrudin Mehmedović ^{U21}	(Serbia)	15 March 1998 (age 28)	(Serbia) FK Mladost Lučani	2019	2019
Forwards
9	Ryutaro Megumi	(Japan)	29 June 1993 (age 33)	(Japan) Aoyama Gakuin University	2017	2019
10	Jordan Webb ^{>30}	(Canada) (Jamaica) (Singapore)	24 March 1988 (age 38)	(Singapore) Warriors FC	2018	2020
13	Taufik Suparno	(Singapore)	31 October 1995 (age 30)	(Singapore) SAFSA	2018	2019
14	Shagir Firaf ^{U23}	(Singapore)	10 April 2000 (age 26)	Youth Team	2019	2019
Players loaned out / left during season
19	Khairul Amri ^{>30}	(Singapore)	14 March 1985 (age 41)	(Singapore) Young Lions FC	2017	2020

== Coaching staff ==
Position	Name	Ref.
Chairman	(Singapore) Desmond Ong	
General Manager	(Singapore) Desmund Khusnin	
Team Manager	(Singapore) Leonard Koh	
Head Coach	(Singapore) Kadir Yahaya	
First Team Coach	(Singapore) Gavin Lee	
Assistant Coach	(Singapore) Fahrudin Mustafić	
Fitness Coach	(Singapore) Isa Halim	
Goalkeeping Coach	(Singapore) William Phang	
Physiotherapist	(Singapore) Premjit Singh	
Kitman	(Singapore) Goh Koon Hiang	

== Transfers ==
=== Pre-season transfers ===
==== In ====
Position	Player	Transferred From	Ref
Coach	(Singapore) Gavin Lee	Promoted	
GK	(Singapore) Zulfairuuz Rudy	(Singapore) Hougang United	
DF	(Singapore) Afiq Yunos	(Singapore) Geylang International	Loan Return
DF	(Singapore) Akmal Azman	(Singapore) NFA U18	
DF	(Singapore) Zakri Ee Kai Ren	(Singapore) NFA U18	
DF	(Singapore) Hamizan Hisham	(Singapore) NFA U18	
DF	(Singapore) Ryaan Sanizal	(Singapore) NFA U16	
MF	(Singapore) Shahdan Sulaiman	(Malaysia) Melaka United	Loan Return
MF	(Singapore) Joel Chew Joon Herng	(Singapore) NFA U18	
MF	(Serbia) Zehrudin Mehmedović	(Serbia) FK Mladost Lučani	1 Year contract
MF	(Serbia) Mirza Delimeđac	(Serbia) FK Novi Pazar Reserve	1 Year contract
FW	(Singapore) Fazrul Nawaz	(Singapore) Hougang United	Loan Return

Note 1: Fazrul Nawaz returned to the team after the loan and subsequently complete the transfer to the cheetah despite signing a 3 years contract in 2018 .

Note 2: Afiq Yunos returned to the team after the loan and subsequently moved to Hougang United despite signing a 3 years contract in 2018.

==== Out ====
Position	Player	Transferred To	Ref
Coach	(Germany) Jurgen Raab	Sacked	
GK	(Singapore) Haikal Hasnol	(Singapore) Home United	Season loan (NS)
GK	(Singapore) Hariz Farid	(Singapore) Police SA (NFL D1)	
DF	(Singapore) Danish Uwais	(Singapore) Tiong Bahru FC (NFL D1)	
DF	(Singapore) Afiq Yunos	(Singapore) Hougang United	Undisclosed
DF	(Singapore) Hafiz Sujad	(Singapore) Hougang United	
DF	(Singapore) (Wales) Ryhan Stewart	(Singapore) Warriors FC	
DF	(Singapore) Shameer Aziq	(Singapore) Warriors FC	
DF	(Singapore) Irfan Najeeb	(Singapore) Garena Young Lions	Season loan (NS)
MF	(Singapore) Haziq Razzali		
MF	(Singapore) Faizal Raffi	(Singapore) Warriors FC	
MF	(Singapore) (Serbia) Fahrudin Mustafic	Retired	
FW	(Singapore) Fazrul Nawaz	(Singapore) Hougang United	$50,000

Note 1: Haikal Hasnol moves to Home United during his NS despite signing a 3 years contract in 2018 .

Note 2: Irfan Najeeb moves to Young Lions during his NS despite signing a 3 years contract in 2018 .

==== Retained ====
Position	Player	Ref
GK	(Singapore) Haikal Hasnol	3 years contract signed in 2018
GK	(Singapore) Syazwan Buhari	2 years contract signed in 2018
DF	(Singapore) Amirul Adli	3 years contract signed in 2018
DF	(Singapore) Shannon Stephen	3 years contract signed in 2018
DF	(Singapore) (England) Daniel Bennett	2 years contract signed in 2018
DF	(Singapore) Irwan Shah	2 years contract signed in 2018
DF	(Singapore) Irfan Najeeb	3 years contract signed in 2018
DF	(Singapore) Afiq Yunos	3 years contract signed in 2018
MF	(Singapore) Safirul Sulaiman	2 years contract signed in 2018
MF	(Singapore) Zulfadhmi Suzliman	3 years contract signed in 2018
MF	(Singapore) Yasir Hanapi	3 years contract signed in 2018
MF	(Singapore) Shahdan Sulaiman	3 years contract signed in 2018
FW	(Singapore) Khairul Amri	3 years contract signed in 2017
FW	(Canada) Jordan Webb	3 years contract signed in 2018
FW	(Japan) Ryutaro Megumi	2 years contract signed in 2018

==== Extension ====
Position	Player	Ref
DF	(Singapore) Madhu Mohana	
MF	(Singapore) Shah Shahiran	
FW	(Singapore) Taufik Suparno	

==== Promoted ====
Position	Player	Ref
MF	(Singapore) Elijah Lim Teck Yong	

==== Trial In ====
Position	Player	Trial From	Ref
MF	(Serbia) Zehrudin Mehmedović	(Serbia) FK Mladost Lučani	
MF	(Serbia) Mirza Delimeđac	(Serbia) FK Novi Pazar Reserve	

==== Trial Out ====
Position	Player	Trial @	Ref
DF	(Singapore) Amirul Adli	(Thailand) Chainat Hornbill F.C.	

=== Mid-season transfers ===
==== Out ====
Position	Player	Transferred to	Ref
FW	(Singapore) Khairul Amri	(Malaysia) Felda United	
MF	(Serbia) Mirza Delimeđac	(Serbia) FK Novi Pazar	

== Friendlies ==
=== SPL Team ===
==== Pre-Season Friendly ====
Win Draw Loss

11 January 2019 1	Singapore Cricket Club	0–9	(Singapore) Tampines Rovers	The Cage
1915 hours			Khairul Amri; Taufik Suparno

3 February 2019 2	Katong FC (Singapore)	0–9	(Singapore) Tampines Rovers	The Arena
1700 hours			Khairul Amri 15', 20', 30', 83'; Jordan Webb 21', 73'; Yasir Hanapi 53', 77'; Ryutaro Megumi 70'

10 February 2019 3	Johor Darul Ta'zim II F.C. (Malaysia)	1–0	(Singapore) Tampines Rovers	Pasir Gudang Corporation Stadium
1730 hours

16 February 2019 4	Albirex Niigata (S) (Singapore)	0–4	(Singapore) Tampines Rovers	Our Tampines Hub
			Khairul Amri; Jordan Webb; Zehrudin Mehmedović; Shahdan Sulaiman (pen.)

Leo Cup 2019 Thailand – 18 to 25 January

19 January 2019 Leo Cup AEC Stage	Chiangrai United F.C. (Thailand)	3–0	(Singapore) Tampines Rovers	Chiang Rai Province
	Shinnaphat Leeaoh 52'; Bill 84'; Ekanit Panya 90+1'			Stadium: Singha Stadium

23 January 2019 Friendly	Chiangrai City F.C. (Thailand)	1–2	(Singapore) Tampines Rovers	Chiang Rai Province
	Goal		Jordan Webb	Stadium: Singha Stadium

=== U19 Team ===
==== Pre-Season Friendly ====
Win Draw Loss

21 January 2019 1	Chiangrai United U23 (Thailand)	2–2	(Singapore) Tampines Rovers U19	Chiang Rai Province
	28'		Shagir Firaf	Stadium: Mae Fah Luang University Sports Complex

3 February 2019 2	Project Vaults FC (Singapore)	0–5	(Singapore) Tampines Rovers U19	The Arena

11 March 2019 3	Simei United (Singapore)	0–4	(Singapore) Tampines Rovers U19	Our Tampines Hub

== Team statistics ==
=== Appearances and goals ===
No.	Pos.	Player	Sleague		Singapore Cup		ACL / AFC Cup		Total	
No.	Pos.	Player	Apps.	Goals	Apps.	Goals	Apps.	Goals	Apps.	Goals
1	GK	(Singapore) Zulfairuuz Rudy	2	0	2	0	0	0	4	0
2	DF	(Singapore) Shannon Stephen	0	0	0	0	0	0	0	0
3	DF	(Singapore) Zakri Ee Kai Ren	0(1)	0	0	0	0	0	1	0
4	DF	(Singapore) Akmal Azman	15(3)	0	1(2)	0	1(2)	0	24	0
5	DF	(Singapore) Amirul Adli	23	1	5	1	6	0	34	2
6	DF	(Singapore) Madhu Mohana	20(4)	0	6	0	6	0	36	0
7	MF	(Singapore) Zulfadhmi Suzliman	2(6)	0	1(1)	0	0(1)	0	11	0
8	MF	(Singapore) Shahdan Sulaiman	23	6	5	2	6	0	34	8
9	FW	(Japan) Ryutaro Megumi	24	6	3(2)	2	6	2	35	10
10	FW	(Canada) Jordan Webb	22(1)	15	4(1)	2	6	4	34	21
11	MF	(Singapore) Safirul Sulaiman	0(3)	0	1	0	0	0	4	0
12	MF	(Singapore) Joel Chew Joon Herng	5(5)	1	6	1	0	0	16	2
13	FW	(Singapore) Taufik Suparno	15(9)	3	1(5)	1	0(6)	0	36	4
14	FW	(Singapore) Shagir Firaf	0	0	1	0	0	0	1	0
15	MF	(Singapore) Shah Shahiran	23	2	5	0	0(4)	0	32	2
16	DF	(Singapore) Daniel Bennett	13(5)	0	5	0	5	0	28	0
17	DF	(Singapore) Irwan Shah	21(3)	2	5(1)	1	6	2	36	5
18	MF	(Singapore) Yasir Hanapi	21	3	5	1	6	1	32	5
23	MF	(Serbia) Zehrudin Mehmedović	6(17)	7	4(2)	2	6	2	35	11
24	GK	(Singapore) Syazwan Buhari	22	0	2	0	6	0	30	0
25	GK	(Singapore) Zephen-Sean	0	0	0	0	0	0	0	0
49	MF	(Singapore) Elijah Lim Teck Yong	0(2)	0	0	0	0	0	2	0
50	DF	(Singapore) Ryaan Sanizal	1(1)	0	2(2)	0	0(1)	0	7	0
61	DF	(Singapore) Hamizan Hisham	3(2)	0	0	0	0	0	5	0
Players who have played this season and/or sign for the season but had left the club or on loan to other club
19	FW	(Singapore) Khairul Amri	2(4)	3	0	0	4(1)	5	11	8
26	MF	(Serbia) Mirza Delimeđac	0	0	0	0	2(3)	1	5	1

Note 1: Shah Shahiran scored an own goal in Singapore Premier League match against Albirex Niigata (S).

=== Hat-tricks ===
Player	Against	Result	Date	Reference
(Singapore) Khairul Amri	(Myanmar) Yangon United	4–3	1 May 2019	

Note ^{4} Player scored 4 goals ^{5} Player scored 5 goals

== Competitions ==
=== Overview ===
Competition	Record							
Competition	P	W	D	L	GF	GA	GD	Win %
Singapore Premier League	24	12	8	4	52	29	+23	50.00
Singapore Cup	6	5	0	1	14	7	+7	83.33
AFC Cup	6	4	1	1	17	10	+7	66.67
Total	36	21	9	6	83	46	+37	58.33

=== Singapore Premier League ===
Win Draw Loss

3 March 2019 1	Hougang United (Singapore)	1–5	(Singapore) Tampines Rovers	Jalan Besar Stadium
	Faris Ramli 54' (pen.); Iqbal Hussain (yellow card) 45'; Justin Hui (yellow card) 46' (yellow-red card) 53'; Fabian Kwok (yellow card) 47'; Nazrul Nazari (yellow card) 83'		Irwan Shah 45' (yellow card) 36'; Ryutaro Megumi 64'; Zulfahmi Arifin 71' (o.g.); Zehrudin Mehmedović 75'; Jordan Webb 93' (yellow card) 47'; Shahdan Sulaiman (penalty missed) 84; Shah Shahiran (yellow card) 35'; Taufik Suparno (yellow card) 59'	Referee: G. Letchman

8 March 2019 2	Tampines Rovers (Singapore)	5–1	(Singapore) Home United	Our Tampines Hub
	Irwan Shah 34'; Yasir Hanapi 41'; Taufik Suparno 50' (penalty missed) 16; Shahdan Sulaiman 59'; Jordan Webb 76' (pen.); Amirul Adli (yellow card) 58'		Adam Swandi 57'; Abdil Qaiyyim Mutalib (yellow card) 58'; Nazri Sabri (yellow card) 75'; Aqhari Abdullah (yellow card) 90'	Referee: Muhammad Taqi

16 March 2019 3	Geylang International (Singapore)	0–1	(Singapore) Tampines Rovers	Our Tampines Hub
	Darren Teh (yellow card) 28'; Amy Recha (yellow card) 49'		Khairul Amri 12'; Jordan Webb (yellow card) 18'	Referee: Muhammad Zulfiqar

29 March 2019 4	Tampines Rovers (Singapore)	0–0	(Singapore) Albirex Niigata (S)	Our Tampines Hub
	Irwan Shah (yellow card) 49'		Kodai Sumikawa (yellow card) 90'	Attendance: 2745; Referee: Juherman Zaiton; Man of the Match: Syazwan Buhari (Singapore)

7 April 2019 5	Brunei DPMM	2–1	(Singapore) Tampines Rovers	Hassanal Bolkiah National Stadium
	Andrey Varankow 45'; Azwan Ali Rahman 60'; Yura Indera Putera Yunos (yellow card) 21'; Razimie Ramlli (yellow card) 82'; Hendra Azam Idris (yellow card) 90'		Khairul Amri 84'; Zulfadhmi Suzliman (yellow card) 19'; Yasir Hanapi (yellow card) 54'	Referee: Nathan Chan

21 April 2019 6	Balestier Khalsa (Singapore)	1–1	(Singapore) Tampines Rovers	Bishan Stadium
	Hazzuwan Halim 74'; Raihan Rahman (yellow card) 63'; Sufianto Salleh (yellow card) 81'; Daniel Goh Ji Xiong (yellow card) 89'		Zehrudin Mehmedović 76'; Shah Shahiran (yellow card) 66'; Shahdan Sulaiman (yellow card) 90+3'	Referee: G. Letchman

24 April 2019 7	Warriors FC (Singapore)	1–1	(Singapore) Tampines Rovers	Jurong East Stadium
	Sahil Suhaimi 53'; Poh Yi Feng (yellow card) 47'; Jonathan Béhé (yellow card) 91'; Khairul Nizam (yellow card) 90+3'		Shahdan Sulaiman 26'; Yasir Hanapi (yellow card) 91'; Irwan Shah (yellow card) 90+6'	Referee: Lim Liang Yi

29 May 2019 8 (Rescheduled)	Tampines Rovers (Singapore)	4–0	(Singapore) Young Lions FC	Our Tampines Hub
	Lionel Tan 12' (o.g.); Taufik Suparno 33'; Zehrudin Mehmedović 89'; Jordan Webb 90+2' (yellow card) 68'; Akmal Azman (yellow card) 44'		Haiqal Pashia (yellow card) 70,78' (yellow-red card)	Referee: Muhammad Zulfiqar / Nazree Hussain; Man of the Match: Ryutaro Megumi (Japan)

5 May 2019 9	Tampines Rovers (Singapore)	3–3	(Singapore) Hougang United	Our Tampines Hub
	Shah Shahiran 57'; Zehrudin Mehmedović 66'; Khairul Amri 70'; Yasir Hanapi (yellow card) 19,51' (yellow-red card); Amirul Adli (yellow card) 85'		Kong Ho-won 30'; Faris Ramli 56' 64'; Anumanthan Kumar (yellow card) 24'; Nikesh Singh Sidhu (yellow card) 64'	Referee: Ahmad A'Qashah; Man of the Match: Zehrudin Mehmedović (Serbia)

23 July 2019 10 (Rescheduled)	Home United (Singapore)	2–4	(Singapore) Tampines Rovers	Bishan Stadium
	Shahril Ishak 23'; Hafiz Nor 26'; Arshad Shamim (yellow card) 39'		Ryutaro Megumi 5'; Yasir Hanapi 58'; Jordan Webb 71' 76'	Referee: G. Letchman

25 May 2019 11	Tampines Rovers (Singapore)	1–1	(Singapore) Geylang International	Our Tampines Hub
	Jordan Webb 21' (pen.)		Shawal Anuar 30'	Referee: Farhan Mohamed; Man of the Match: Akmal Azman (Singapore)

15 June 2019 12	Albirex Niigata (S) (Singapore)	3–1	(Singapore) Tampines Rovers	Jurong East Stadium
	Hiroyoshi Kamata 5'; Daizo Horikoshi 41'; Shah Shahiran 69' (o.g.); Shoki Ohara (yellow card) 36'; Kyoga Nakamura (yellow card) 70'		Shahdan Sulaiman 81'; Joel Chew (yellow card) 35'; Zehrudin Mehmedovic (yellow card) 55'; Zulfadhmi Suzliman (yellow card) 70'; Irwan Shah (yellow card) 75'; Yasir Hanapi (yellow card) 82'	Referee: G. Letchman

22 June 2019 13	Tampines Rovers (Singapore)	3–1	Brunei DPMM	Our Tampines Hub
	Ryutaro Megumi 26' 70'; Jordan Webb 40' (yellow card) 81'		Razimie Ramlli 27'; Azwan Ali Rahman (yellow card) 43'; Yura Indera Putera Yunos (yellow card) 57' (yellow-red card) 64'	Referee: Jansen Foo; Man of the Match: Ryutaro Megumi (Japan)

7 July 2019 14	Tampines Rovers (Singapore)	4–2	(Singapore) Balestier Khalsa	Our Tampines Hub
	Zehrudin Mehmedovic 15' 44'; Jordan Webb 17'; Ryutaro Megumi 31'		Raihan Rahman 47'; Sime Zuzul 87' (pen.)	Referee: Muhd Taqi

14 July 2019 15	Tampines Rovers (Singapore)	1–2	(Singapore) Warriors FC	Our Tampines Hub
	Jordan Webb 90+6' (pen.); Amirul Adli (yellow card) 17'		Yeo Hai Ngee 22'; Sahil Suhaimi 60'	Referee: Jansen Foo

18 July 2019 16 (Rescheduled)	Young Lions FC (Singapore)	1–1	(Singapore) Tampines Rovers	Jalan Besar Stadium
	Syed Firdaus Hassan 69'		Jordan Webb 23' (yellow card) 72'; Yasir Hanapi (yellow card) 63'	Referee: Juherman Zaiton

27 July 2019 17	Hougang United (Singapore)	2–4	(Singapore) Tampines Rovers	Jalan Besar Stadium
	Stipe Plazibat 57'; Fabian Kwok 79'; Zulfahmi Arifin (yellow card) 45'; Alif Iskandar (yellow card) 47'; Kong Ho-won (yellow card) 65'; Nazrul Nazari (yellow card) 65'		Jordan Webb 45+1' (pen.) 75'; Yasir Hanapi 69'; Joel Chew 90+5'	Referee: Juherman Zaiton

3 August 2019 18	Tampines Rovers (Singapore)	3–0	(Singapore) Home United	Our Tampines Hub
	Shahdan Sulaiman 18'; Shah Shahiran 28'; Ryutaro Megumi 72'			Referee: Muhammad Zulfiqar; Man of the Match: Shahdan Sulaiman (Singapore)

14 August 2019 19	Geylang International (Singapore)	2–1	(Singapore) Tampines Rovers	Jalan Besar Stadium
	Shawal Anuar 16'; Yuki Ichikawa 90'		Shadan Sulaiman 44'	Referee: Nathan Chan

18 August 2019 20 (Rescheduled)	Tampines Rovers (Singapore)	2–0	(Singapore) Albirex Niigata (S)	Our Tampines Hub
	Shadan Sulaiman 2'; Jordan Webb 22'			Referee: Farhan Mohamed

18 September 2019 21 (Rescheduled)	Brunei DPMM	0–1	(Singapore) Tampines Rovers	Hassanal Bolkiah National Stadium
			Jordan Webb 16'	Referee: Nathan Chan

14 September 2019 22	Tampines Rovers (Singapore)	3–3	(Singapore) Balestier Khalsa	Our Tampines Hub
	Taufik Suparno 6'; Yasir Hanapi 31'; Jordan Webb 91'		Hazzuwan Halim 21'; Sanjin Vrebac 29'; Kristijan Krajcek 81'	Referee: Farhan Mohamed

22 September 2019 23	Warriors FC (Singapore)	0–1	(Singapore) Tampines Rovers	Jurong East Stadium
			Amirul Adli 84'	Referee: Juherman Zaiton

29 September 2019 24	Tampines Rovers (Singapore)	1–1	(Singapore) Young Lions FC	Our Tampines Hub
	Zehrudin Mehmedović 68'		Saifullah Akbar 85' (pen.)	Referee: Jansen Foo

Pos	Team	Pld	W	D	L	GF	GA	GD	Pts	Qualification or relegation
1	DPMM (Note: The two foreign clubs – Albirex Niigata (S) and DPMM – as well as the Football Association of Singapore (FAS) under-21 team, Young Lions, are ineligible for any AFC competition spots.) (C)	24	15	5	4	51	25	+26	50	
2	Tampines Rovers	24	12	8	4	52	29	+23	44	Qualification for AFC Champions League preliminary round 1
3	Hougang United	24	13	4	7	58	45	+13	43	Qualification for AFC Cup group stage
4	Albirex Niigata (S)	24	12	5	7	36	25	+11	41	
5	Geylang International	24	10	3	11	41	48	−7	33	

Source: Singapore Premier League
Rules for classification: 1) points; 2) goal difference; 3) number of goals scored; 4) number of wins
(C) Champions

=== Singapore Cup ===
Win Draw Loss

==== Group ====
25 September 2019 Match 1	Tampines Rovers (Singapore)	1–3	(Singapore) Warriors FC	Our Tampines Hub
	Jordan Webb 72' (pen.)		Sahil Suhaimi 7' 73'; Tajeli Salamat 90+2'	Referee: Farhan Mohamad

19 October 2019 Match 2	Balestier Khalsa (Singapore)	0–2	(Singapore) Tampines Rovers	Bishan Stadium
			Jordan Webb 59'; Ryutaro Megumi 79'	Referee: Muhd Taqi

23 October 2019 Match 3	Tampines Rovers (Singapore)	3–0	(Singapore) Home United	Our Tampines Hub
	Zehrudin Mehmedović 66'; Ryutaro Megumi 74'; Taufik Suparno 86'			Referee: G.Letchman

==== Semi-final ====
26 October 2019 SF Leg 1	Geylang International (Singapore)	0–2	(Singapore) Tampines Rovers	Our Tampines Hub
			Shahdan Sulaiman 8' (pen.); Yasir Hanapi 78'	Referee: Farhan Mohamad

30 October 2019 SF Leg 2	Tampines Rovers (Singapore)	2–1 (4–1 agg.)	(Singapore) Geylang International	Our Tampines Hub
	Yasir Hanapi 5'; Shahdan Sulaiman 85' (pen.)		Jufri Taha 74'	Referee: Nathan Chan

Tampines Rovers won 4–1 on aggregate.

==== Final ====
3 November 2019 Final	Warriors FC (Singapore)	3–4	(Singapore) Tampines Rovers	Jalan Besar Stadium
	Khairul Nizam 12' 19'; Sahil Suhaimi (penalty missed) 84; Fairoz Hasan 84'; Shameer Aziq (yellow card) 52'; Yeo Hai Ngee (yellow card) 61'		Irwan Shah 17'; Joel Chew Joon Herng 31'; Amirul Adli 57'; Zehrudin Mehmedović 65' (yellow card) 90'; Yasir Hanapi (yellow card) 46'; Jordan Webb (yellow card) 74'; Taufik Surpano (yellow card) 78'	Attendance: 2,952; Referee: Muhammad Taqi

=== AFC Cup ===
Pos	Team	Pld	W	D	L	GF	GA	GD	Pts	Qualification	HAN	TAM	YAN	NAG
1	(Vietnam) Hà Nội	6	4	1	1	23	5	+18	13 (Note: Head-to-head results: Tampines Rovers 1–1 Hà Nội, Hà Nội 2–0 Tampines Rovers.)	Zonal semi-finals	—	2–0	0–1	10–0
2	(Singapore) Tampines Rovers	6	4	1	1	17	10	+7	13		1–1	—	4–3	4–2
3	(Myanmar) Yangon United	6	2	0	4	10	14	−4	6		2–5	1–3	—	2–0
4	(Cambodia) Nagaworld	6	1	0	5	6	27	−21	3		1–5	1–5	2–1	—

Source: AFC
Rules for classification: Group stage tiebreakers
Notes:

Win Draw Loss

==== Group stage ====
26 February 2019 Matchday 1	Yangon United (Myanmar)	1–3	(Singapore) Tampines Rovers	Thingangyun Township, Yangon
	Sekou Sylla 13'; Kekere Moukailou (yellow card) 64'	Report	Khairul Amri 55'; Zehrudin Mehmedović 61'; Ryutaro Megumi 68'	Stadium: Thuwunna Stadium; Attendance: 675; Referee: Shukri Al-Hunfush (Saudi Arabia); Man of the Match: Khairul Amri (Singapore)

12 March 2019 Matchday 2	Tampines Rovers (Singapore)	1–1	(Vietnam) Hanoi FC	Singapore
	Jordan Webb 77'; Yasir Hanapi (yellow card) 51'	Report	Pape Omar Faye 62'	Stadium: Jalan Besar Stadium; Attendance: 1671; Referee: Omar Mohamed Al-Ali (United Arab Emirates); Man of the Match: Jordan Webb (Canada)

2 April 2019 Matchday 3	Nagaworld FC (Cambodia)	1–5	(Singapore) Tampines Rovers	Phnom Penh, Cambodia
	Dani Kouch 24'	Report	Jordan Webb 45', 66'; Zehrudin Mehmedovic 57'; Mirza Delimedjac 90+1'; Ryutaro Megumi 90+3'; Daniel Bennett (yellow card) 40'	Stadium: Phnom Penh Olympic Stadium; Attendance: 320; Referee: Ahmad Al-Ali (Kuwait); Man of the Match: Zehrudin Mehmedović (Serbia)

17 April 2019 Matchday 4	Tampines Rovers (Singapore)	4–2	(Laos) Nagaworld FC	Singapore
	Irwan Shah 3'; Yasir Hanapi 87'; Khairul Amri 90+1'; Jordan Webb 90+5'	Report	Dani Kouch 14' (yellow card) 64'; Esoh Omogba 90'; Atuheire Kipson (yellow card) 28'	Stadium: Jalan Besar Stadium; Attendance: 1,283; Referee: Yusuke Araki (Japan); Man of the Match: Khairul Amri (Singapore)

1 May 2019 Matchday 5	Tampines Rovers (Singapore)	4–3	(Myanmar) Yangon United	Singapore
	Khairul Amri 2' 43' 77'; Irwan Shah 90+1'	Report	Soe Min Naing 58'; Maung Maung Lwin 77'; Kyaw Zin Oo 85'	Stadium: Jalan Besar Stadium; Attendance: 1,827; Referee: Kim Dae-yong (South Korea); Man of the Match: Khairul Amri (Singapore)

15 May 2019 Matchday 6	Hanoi FC (Vietnam)	2–0	(Singapore) Tampines Rovers	Hanoi, Vietnam
	Ganiyu Oseni 10'; Nguyễn Thành Chung 31'; Tran Dinh Trong (yellow card) 45+2'; Nguyễn Văn Dũng (yellow card) 75'	Report	Yasir Hanapi (yellow card) 15,45+2' (yellow-red card); Jordan Webb (yellow card) 84'	Stadium: Hàng Đẫy Stadium; Referee: Ali Shaban (Kuwait)

== Tampines Rovers End of Season Award Night ==
Awards	Winners
Player of the Year	(Singapore) Shahdan Sulaiman
Fans' Player of the Year	(Canada) Jordan Webb
Young Player of the Year	(Singapore) Shah Shahiran
Golden Boot	(Canada) Jordan Webb

== See also ==
- 2017 Tampines Rovers FC season
- 2018 Tampines Rovers FC season
