= Silvas =

Silvas is a surname. Notable people with the surname include:

- Diego Silvas (born 1997), American soccer player
- Haim Silvas (born 1975), Israeli footballer and manager
- Lucie Silvas (born 1977), British singer-songwriter
- Tom Silvas, American soccer player
