= Raspreet Sandhu =

American soccer player

Personal information
- Date of birth: 15 September 1993 (age 33)
- Place of birth: Mountain View, California, United States
- Positions: Forward; winger

Team information
- Current team: Tampines Rovers
- Number: 12

Youth career
- American Youth Soccer Organization

College career
Years	Team	Apps	(Gls)
2013–2015	Sonoma State Seawolves		(4)

Senior career*
Years	Team	Apps	(Gls)
2017–	Tampines Rovers FC	6	(0)
- * Club domestic league appearances and goals

Raspreet Sandhu (born 15 September 1993) is an American professional soccer player who plays for Tampines Rovers as a forward or winger. As fielding more than three players is proscribed by the S.League regulations, he is allowed to play in the AFC Cup. So far he has made one assist in a 2–1 victory over Felda United.

== College ==
Recording seven assists and three goals with the Sonoma State Seawolves, his attacking abilities were complimented by Sonoma State coach Marcus Ziemer who said 'his ball skills were outstanding', was 'quick' and 'agile' and had 'excellent vision'. The American-born player is the first overseas Sikh to play in the S.League and was playing football at the age of two.

== Career ==
=== Tampines Rovers ===
Over 30 family members watched the fixture versus Felda United in which he made his debut. Tampines Rovers president and director both were impressed by his football ability.

== AFC Cup statistics ==
Year	Club	Apps	Goals
2017	Tampines Rovers FC	2	0

== Personal life ==
His father Kalwant, a pious Sikh, played for Tampines Rovers FC in his time as a footballer. Later, Kalwant emigrated to Mountain View, California with his wife Pamela and Raspreet was born there as well as his two brothers, Hanspreet and Chandpreet.

== See also ==
- List of Sikh footballers
