= Tom Silvas =

American soccer player

Thomas Silvas
Personal information
- Full name: Thomas Silvas
- Height: 5 ft 9 in (1.75 m)
- Position: Forward

Youth career
- 1983–1986: UCLA

Senior career*
Years	Team	Apps	(Gls)
1987	Los Angeles Heat		
1988	San Jose Earthquakes		
1989	California Kickers		
1990	Los Angeles Heat	0	(0)
1990	Orlando Lions		
1993	Santa Cruz Surf		
1996–1998	Chico Rooks		

International career
1986	United States	2	(0)
- * Club domestic league appearances and goals

Thomas Silvas is a retired American soccer forward who played three seasons in the Western Soccer Alliance, one in the American Professional Soccer League and at least two in the USISL. He earned two caps with the U.S. national team in 1986 and currently works as assistant coach for Singapore side Tampines Rovers.

== High school and college ==
Silvas attended St. Francis High School from 1980 to 1983. He played four seasons with the Lancers soccer team in the West Catholic Athletic League being named the league's offensive MVP from 1981 to 1983. He also holds the league's career scoring record with 41 goals in 36 games. He then attended UCLA where he played on the men's soccer team from 1983 to 1986. In 1985, the Bruins won the NCAA Men's Soccer Championship and Silvas was named the team's offensive MVP.

== Professional ==
Silvas spent three seasons in the Western Soccer Alliance, each with a different team. In 1987, he played with the Los Angeles Heat, in 1988 with the San Jose Earthquakes, and in 1989 with the California Kickers. In 1990, the league merged with the American Soccer League to form the American Professional Soccer League. Silvas began the season with the Heat, but was hampered by an ankle injury. The team released him as he was healthy and he jumped across the country to sign with the Orlando Lions in June 1990. He played for the Chico Rooks of the USISL from 1996 to 1998.

== National team ==
Silvas earned two caps with the U.S. national team, both in February 1986. The first game was a scoreless tie with Canada on February 5. Bruce Murray replaced him in the 80th minute. The second game came two days later, a 1–1 tie with Uruguay.

== Post-playing career ==
Silvas works as an attorney in Los Gatos, California and coaches youth club soccer in San Jose, California. He was the junior varsity soccer coach at St. Francis High School. From the past two years, he has led the JV soccer team to back-to-back championships, the first one being, which was not won in a very long time, all wins except 1 loss, and 2 ties, and the second championship(2007–2008) going undefeated. This is the first time since 1977 since the J.V. boys soccer team had won back-to-back soccer championships. As of 2011, Coach Silvas became the coach of the varsity team at Saint Francis, leading the team to the WCAL championship and winning a Coach of the Year award along the way.

== Asian coaching career ==
In June 2016, Silvas accepted an invitation to move to Singapore to work with S.League club Tampines Rovers where his teenage son Diego Silvas was part of the first-team squad. After helping on an informal basis in the 2016 season as Tampines finished second in the league, and made the final of the Singapore Cup, Silvas was appointed assistant coach for the 2017 S.League season.
