= Imran Sahib =

Singaporean footballer

Personal information
- Full name: Mohammad Imran Sahib bin Mohamed Ibrahim Sahib
- Date of birth: 12 October 1982 (age 44)
- Place of birth: Singapore
- Height: 1.70 m (5 ft 7 in)
- Position: Right-back

Senior career*
Years	Team	Apps	(Gls)
2001	Sembawang Rangers	29	(3)
2002–2004	Home United	20	(2)
2005	Young Lions	9	(0)
2005–2006	Home United	32	(1)
2007	Woodlands Wellington	31	(2)
2008–2016	Tampines Rovers	88	(1)
2016	Gymkhana		
2017	Tampines Rovers		

International career
2004	Singapore	4	(0)
- * Club domestic league appearances and goals

Mohammad Imran Sahib bin Mohamed Ibrahim Sahib (born 12 October 1982) is a former Singapore international footballer.

== Club career ==
Previously, Imran played for Sembawang Rangers, Woodlands Wellington, Home United & Young Lions.

Imran contract with Home United was not renewed for the 2016 season despite his good season in 2015.

Imran joined then joined Singapore Islandwide League club, Gymkhana in 2016 for leisure.

In 2017, it was reported that Imran had since moved to Tampines Rovers before retiring at the end of the season.

== International career ==
Played 4 times for his country, Imran has not opened his account. Not selected since 2004.

== Controversial ==
Imran was sentenced on 13 November 2020 to 18 weeks' jail and a fine of $1,000 for offences including molesting his Tinder date's friend.

== Honours ==
=== International ===
Singapore

- ASEAN Football Championship: 2004
