= Ryutaro Megumi =

Japanese footballer

Personal information
- Date of birth: June 29, 1993 (age 33)
- Place of birth: Chiba, Japan
- Height: 1.71 m (5 ft 7 1/2 in)
- Position: Forward

Team information
- Current team: Cerveza Tokyo

Youth career
- 2012–2015: Aoyama Gakuin University

Senior career*
Years	Team	Apps	(Gls)
2016	Tsukuba FC	29	(10)
2017–2019	Tampines Rovers	48	(21)
2020–2022	FELDA United	10	(0)
2022–	Cerveza Tokyo		
- * Club domestic league appearances and goals as of 9 April 2017

Ryutaro Megumi (恵 龍太郎, Megumi Ryūtarō; born June 29, 1993) is a Japanese footballer who plays for Japanese club Cerveza FC Tokyo as a forward.. He was educated at and played for Aoyama Gakuin University. He moved to Tampines Rovers in 2017 after impressing scouts during a football trial.

== Club career ==
=== Tsukuba FC ===
Megumi was playing for Tsukuba FC in the Kantō Soccer League, where he scored a grand total of 10 goals in 29 games for the club. In December 2016, he announced that he would be leaving the club to further his footballing career elsewhere.

=== Tampines Rovers ===
In February 2017, Megumi signed a 10-month contract with S.League side Tampines Rovers FC for the 2017 S.League season. He scored on his league debut in a 1-2 loss to 2016 S.League champions Albirex Niigata Singapore. Following this, he was set up by fellow new signing Ivan Jakov Džoni.

He scored his first brace for the club in a 4-0 demolition of Geylang International while assisting another two goals. In total, Megumi netted 14 goals in the league for his new club.

Megumi ended the season as the Stags' top-scorer and was also nominated for the S.League Player of the Year award. In December 2017, the club announced that he will be renewing his contract with the club.

=== FELDA United ===
In 2020, Megumi moved to Malaysia Super League club, FELDA United.

=== Cerveza FC Tokyo ===
In 2022, Megumi returned to Japan to join Cerveza FC Tokyo.

== Career statistics ==
=== Club ===
As of 6 Nov 2020

Club	Season	League			Singapore Cup		League Cup & Others		AFC Cup		Total	
Club	Season	Division	Apps	Goals	Apps	Goals	Apps	Goals	Apps	Goals	Apps	Goals
Tampines Rovers	2017	S.League	23	7	2	0	0	0	8	0	33	7
Tampines Rovers	2018	Singapore Premier League	24	4	2	0	0	0	5	0	31	4
Tampines Rovers	2019	Singapore Premier League	24	6	5	2	0	0	6	2	35	10
Tampines Rovers	Total		71	17	9	2	0	0	19	2	99	21
Club	Season	League			FA Cup		Malaysia Cup		AFC Cup		Total	
Club	Season	Division	Apps	Goals	Apps	Goals	Apps	Goals	Apps	Goals	Apps	Goals
FELDA United	2020	Malaysia Super League	10	0	0	0	1	0	0	0	11	0
FELDA United	Total		10	0	0	0	1	0	0	0	11	0
Career total			74	17	9	2	0	0	19	2	102	21

== Honours ==
Tampines Rovers

- Singapore Cup: 2019
