= Shannon Stephen =

Singaporean footballer (born 1994)

Personal information
- Date of birth: 2 June 1994 (age 32)
- Place of birth: Singapore
- Height: 1.80 m (5 ft 11 in)
- Position: Defender

Senior career*
Years	Team	Apps	(Gls)
2012	Young Lions	3	(0)
2013	Tampines Rovers	3	(0)
2016	Young Lions	8	(0)
2017–2020	Tampines Rovers	19	(3)
- * Club domestic league appearances and goals

Shannon Stephen (born 2 June 1994) is a Singaporean former professional footballer who played for the Singapore Premier League side, Tampines Rovers as a defender.

== Education ==
Stephen studied in Republic Polytechnic.

== Career ==
In 2013, Stephen signed for Tampines Rovers.

In 2013, he hurt his knee during a Prime League game and suffered an anterior cruciate ligament (ACL) injury with the ACL snapped. He had surgery and recovered after nine months.

In 2014, Stephen signed for the Young Lions. While playing for the Young Lions, Stephen was called up by the Singapore national team's coach V. Sundramoorthy as a hopeful addition to the national team in 2015. However, he tore his ACL again during a training session.

In 2017, he was called up to play in an international friendly against Lebanon.

Stephen retired from football in 2021.

== Later life ==
After retiring from football Stephen worked as a fitness trainer.

== Personal life ==
Stephen's father, Stephen Rajah, was a professional footballer with defunct club Sembawang Rangers FC.

== Career statistics ==
As of 2 December 2020

Appearances and goals by club, season and competition
Club	Season	League			Singapore Cup		League Cup		Continental		Total	
Club	Season	Division	Apps	Goals	Apps	Goals	Apps	Goals	Apps	Goals	Apps	Goals
Young Lions	2012	S.League	3	0	0	0	3	0	0	0	3	0
Tampines Rovers	2013	S.League	2	0	0	0	1	0	0	0	3	0
Young Lions	2015	S.League	0	0	0	0	0	0	0	0	0	0
Young Lions	2016	S.League	7	0	1	0	0	0	0	0	8	0
Young Lions	Total		7	0	1	0	0	0	0	0	8	0
Tampines Rovers	2017	S.League	7	3	0	0	0	0	0	0	7	3
Tampines Rovers	2018	S.League	0	0	0	0	0	0	2	0	2	0
Tampines Rovers	2019	Singapore Premier League	0	0	0	0	0	0	0	0	0	0
Tampines Rovers	2020	Singapore Premier League	5	0	0	0	0	0	4	0	9	0
Tampines Rovers	Total		12	3	0	0	0	0	6	0	18	3
Career total			24	3	1	0	4	0	6	0	32	3

== Honours ==
Tampines Rovers

- Singapore Cup: 2019
- Singapore Community Shield: 2020
