= Jufri Taha =

Singaporean footballer

Personal information
- Full name: Muhammad Jufri bin Taha
- Date of birth: 4 March 1985 (age 41)
- Place of birth: Singapore
- Height: 1.72 m (5 ft 7 1/2 in)
- Position: Defender

Senior career*
| Years | Team | Apps | (Gls) |
| 2006–2009 | Balestier Khalsa | 79 | (1) |
| 2010–2017 | Tampines Rovers | 142 | (0) |
| 2018–2020 | Geylang International | 38 | (0) |
| 2020–2021 | Balestier Khalsa | 7 | (0) |
| 2022–2024 | Warwick Knights | | |

International career^{‡}
| 2012 | Singapore | 3 | (0) |
- * Club domestic league appearances and goals as of 07:46, 25 November 2014 (UTC) ‡ National team caps and goals as of 10 February 2013

Muhammad Jufri bin Taha (born 4 March 1985) is a retired Singaporean footballer who last plays as a defender for NFL club Warwick Knights.
