= Shahdan Sulaiman =

Singaporean footballer (born 1988)

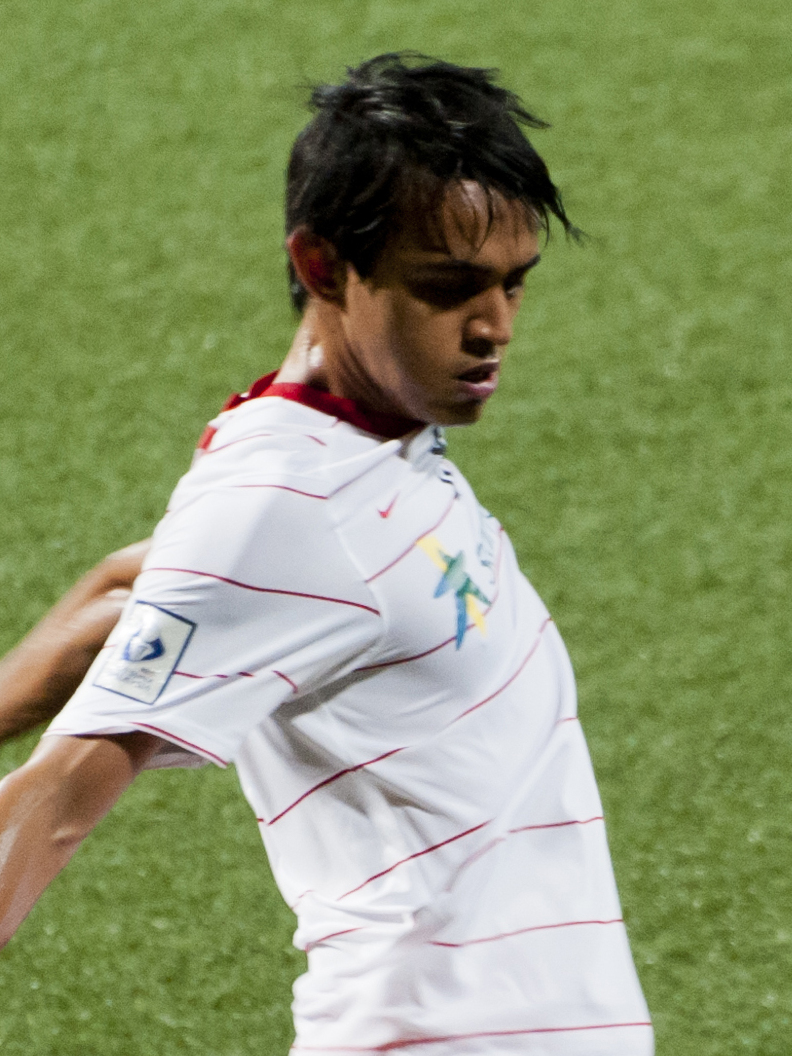
- Shahdan in 2012

Personal information
- Full name: Shahdan bin Sulaiman
- Date of birth: 9 May 1988 (age 38)
- Place of birth: Singapore
- Height: 1.80 m (5 ft 11 in)
- Position: Midfielder

Youth career
- 2000–2005: National Football Academy

Senior career*
Years	Team	Apps	(Gls)
2006–2008	Tampines Rovers	52	(4)
2009–2010	Home United	37	(1)
2010–2011	Tampines Rovers	39	(5)
2011	Young Lions	13	(2)
2012	LionsXII	25	(8)
2013–2014	Tampines Rovers	52	(9)
2015	LionsXII	25	(4)
2016	Tampines Rovers	35	(8)
2018	→ Melaka United (loan)	20	(1)
2019	Tampines Rovers	24	(6)
2020–2022	Lion City Sailors	42	(6)
2023–	Hougang United	43	(3)

International career^{‡}
2010–	Singapore	90	(6)
Medal record
Men's football
Representing Singapore
Sea Games
Bronze medal – third place	Vientiane 2009	Football
Asean Football Championship
Winner	AFF Suzuki Cup 2012	2012
- * Club domestic league appearances and goals as of 28 July 2018 ‡ National team caps and goals as of 14 December 2024

Shahdan bin Sulaiman (born 9 May 1988), better known as Shahdan, is a Singaporean professional footballer who plays as a central-midfielder most recently for Singapore Premier League club Geylang International and the Singapore national team. He is known for his free-kick abilities and long-range efforts.

A versatile player, Shahdan is also capable of playing either as a Defensive Midfielder, Attacking Midfielder and occasionally a centre-back.

== Club career ==
=== Early career ===
Shahdan previously played for S.League clubs Home United, Tampines Rovers & Young Lions. He moved to play for the LionsXII in the Malaysia Super League for the 2012 season. In 2012, while playing for the LionsXII, Shahdan Sulaiman's impressive form had attracted the attention of the Thai scouts from Pattaya United F.C. who likened him to be a player in the mould of Kaka due to his vision and passing ability. He was briefly considered by the Thai club to join as part of their foreign Asian player scheme, but the move did not happen.

=== Tampines Rovers ===
He joined Tampines Rovers in the 2013 season after he was left out of the LionsXII squad as the squad was mostly made up of U-23 players in preparation of the Southeast Asian Games.

In 2013, he signed a 23 months contract with his old club Tampines Rovers. He finished the 2013 season with 4 goals and 9 assists. At the end of 2014, while playing for the national team in the AFF Championship, he picked up an injury which ruled him out for 6 months of the 2015 season.

=== Back to LionsXII ===
Following his recovery from a long-term injury he picked up at the end of 2014, Shahdan re-joined the LionsXII in 2015. He made his long awaited comeback in a game against Sime Darby as a late substitute in May 2015. In his next match against ATM FA, he scored with his first touch of the ball and made his first start in July, against Kelantan.

=== Re-signing for the Stags ===
In January 2016, after the disbandment of LionsXII, he went back to Tampines Rovers FC, although he has had to take a huge pay cut. Shahdan played a key role in the team, starting 10 out of 10 league games for the stags before he then missed a huge chunk of the season due to an injury that he picked up in the 90th minute of an AFC Cup tie with Selangor at the Singapore Sports Hub. He marked his return in late October, helping his team to a 3-1 win over the Young Lions and eventually secured a place in the national team for the 2016 AFF Championship.

Shahdan remained with the stags for the 2017 S.League season. He had a good season, scoring 6 goals in all competitions, with his performances attracting interest from MSL side Melaka United.

=== Melaka United ===
Shahdan signed for Malaysia Super League side Melaka United for the 2018 season on a season long loan from the Stags to fill their ASEAN foreign player slot. On 26 August 2018, in the Malaysia Cup fixture vs PDRM, he scored the 4th goal of the match with a free kick in a 6-1 away victory.

=== Returning to Tampines Rovers ===
Shahdan returned to the Stags for the 2019 Singapore Premier League season and had a stellar season where he was one of three nominees for the Player of the Year award.

=== Lion City Sailors ===
Shahdan then signed for the Singapore Premier League's first privatised club, Lion City Sailors for the 2020 Singapore Premier League season. On 18 April 2022, He assisted Pedro Henrique goal from a corner with a famous victory over Korean club, Daegu FC in the AFC Champions League. On 29 June 2022, he scored a free kick against Young Lions. On 19 June 2022, Shahdan scored 2 volleys from outside the box against Balestier Khalsa. On 16 July 2022, he found the back of the net with a great effort goal from outside the box against Geylang International. He ended his season with 5 goals and 6 assists.

=== Hougang United ===
Shahdan signed for the Cheetahs ahead of the 2023 SPL season but suffered a fractured fibula and dislocation of his left ankle during pre-season which meant that he missed most of the campaign. However, he overcame these issues and established himself as a key player for Hougang United in the 2024 Singapore Premier League season with one goal and three assists from 14 appearances.

== International career ==
Shahdan got his first goal for the national team in a 2–2 draw with Azerbaijan, scoring a last gasp equaliser to help the Lions come back from behind.

8 June 2019, he scored a free kick and got himself an assist in a 4-3 win against Solomon Islands.

In the 2020 AFF Championship 2nd leg semi-finals fixture vs Indonesia, with one swerve of his right foot, Shahdan sent a free-kick to the top left corner of Indonesia’s net, which gave nine-man Singapore a shock 2-1 lead, although the Lions ultimately lost in extra time.

As of January 2023, Shahdan has amassed 85 caps for the senior national team.

== Career statistics ==
=== Club ===
As of match played 24 Oct 2022

Club	Season	League			Cup^{1}		League Cup^{2}		Continental		Total	
Club	Season	Division	Apps	Goals	Apps	Goals	Apps	Goals	Apps	Goals	Apps	Goals
Tampines Rovers	2006	S.League	5	0	—	—	—	—	—	—	5	0
Tampines Rovers	2007	S.League	21	2	—	—	—	—	—	—	21	2
Tampines Rovers	2008	S.League	26	2	—	—	—	—	—	—	26	2
Tampines Rovers	Total		52	4	—	—	—	—	—	—	52	4
Home United	2009	S.League	21	0	—	—	—	—	—	—	21	0
Home United	2010	S.League	16	1	1	0	1	0	—	—	18	1
Home United	Total		37	1	1	0	1	0	—	—	39	1
Tampines Rovers	2010	S.League	7	1	5	2	—	—	—	—	12	3
Tampines Rovers	2011	S.League	19	7	—	—	—	—	7	1	26	8
Tampines Rovers	Total		26	8	5	2	—	—	7	1	38	11
Young Lions	2011	S.League	13	2	—	—	—	—	—	—	13	2
Young Lions	Total		13	2	—	—	—	—	—	—	13	2
LionsXII	2012	Malaysia Super League	25	8	4	0	10	0	—	—	39	8
LionsXII	Total		25	8	4	0	10	0	—	—	39	8
Tampines Rovers	2013	S.League	25	4	1	0	3	0	5	0	34	4
Tampines Rovers	2014	S.League	27	5	6	0	1	0	7	0	41	5
Tampines Rovers	Total		52	9	7	0	4	0	12	0	75	9
LionsXII	2015	Malaysia Super League	0	1	0	0	0	2	—	—	0	0
LionsXII	Total		0	0	0	0	0	0	—	—	0	0
Tampines Rovers	2016	S.League	13	2	1	0	1	1	6	0	21	3
Tampines Rovers	2017	S.League	21	5	2	1	0	0	4	0	27	6
Tampines Rovers	Total		34	7	3	1	1	1	10	0	48	9
Melaka United (loan)	2018	Malaysia Super League	20	0	0	1	0	0	—	—	20	1
Melaka United (loan)	Total		20	0	0	1	0	0	—	—	20	1
Tampines Rovers	2019	S.League	23	6	5	2	0	0	6	0	34	8
Tampines Rovers	Total		23	6	5	2	0	0	6	0	34	8
Lion City Sailors	2020	Singapore Premier League	13	1	0	0	0	0	0	0	13	1
Lion City Sailors	2021	Singapore Premier League	20	2	0	0	0	0	0	0	20	2
Lion City Sailors	2022	Singapore Premier League	25	5	0	0	1	0	6	0	32	5
Lion City Sailors	Total		58	8	0	0	1	0	6	0	65	8
Hougang United	2023	Singapore Premier League	3	0	2	0	0	0	4	0	9	0
Hougang United	2024–25	Singapore Premier League	0	0	0	0	0	0	0	0	0	0
Hougang United	Total		3	0	2	0	0	0	4	0	9	0
Career total			333	50	27	5	16	0	39	1	415	56

^{1} Includes Singapore Cup and Malaysia FA Cup.
^{2} Includes Malaysia Cup and Singapore League Cup.

=== International goals ===
Scores and results list Singapore's goal tally first.

No	Date	Venue	Opponent	Score	Result	Competition
1.	24 Feb 2012	The Sevens Stadium, Dubai, United Arab Emirates	Azerbaijan	2–2	2–2	Friendly
2.	8 June 2012	Jalan Besar Stadium, Kallang, Singapore	Malaysia	2–1	2–2	2012 Causeway Challenge
3.	23 March 2018	National Stadium, Kallang, Singapore	Maldives	2–1	3–2	Friendly
4.	8 June 2019	National Stadium, Kallang, Singapore	Solomon Islands	2–2	4–3	Friendly
5.	11 November 2021	Al Hamriya Sports Club Stadium, Sharjah, United Arab Emirates	Kyrgyzstan	1–2	1–2	Friendly
6.	25 December 2021	National Stadium, Kallang, Singapore	Indonesia	1–2	4–2	2020 AFF Championship

== Honours ==
=== Club ===
Tampines Rovers

- S. League: 2011, 2013
- Singapore Cup: 2019

Lion City Sailors

- Singapore Premier League: 2021
- Singapore Community Shield: 2022

==== Hougang United ====
- Singapore Cup Runner-ups (1): 2023

=== International ===
- AFF Suzuki Cup: 2012

=== Individual ===
- Singapore Premier League Team of the Year: 2019, 2021

== Others ==
=== Singapore Selection Squad ===
He was selected as part of the Singapore Selection squad for The Sultan of Selangor's Cup to be held on 24 August 2019.
