= Jordan Webb =

Canadian soccer player (born 1988)

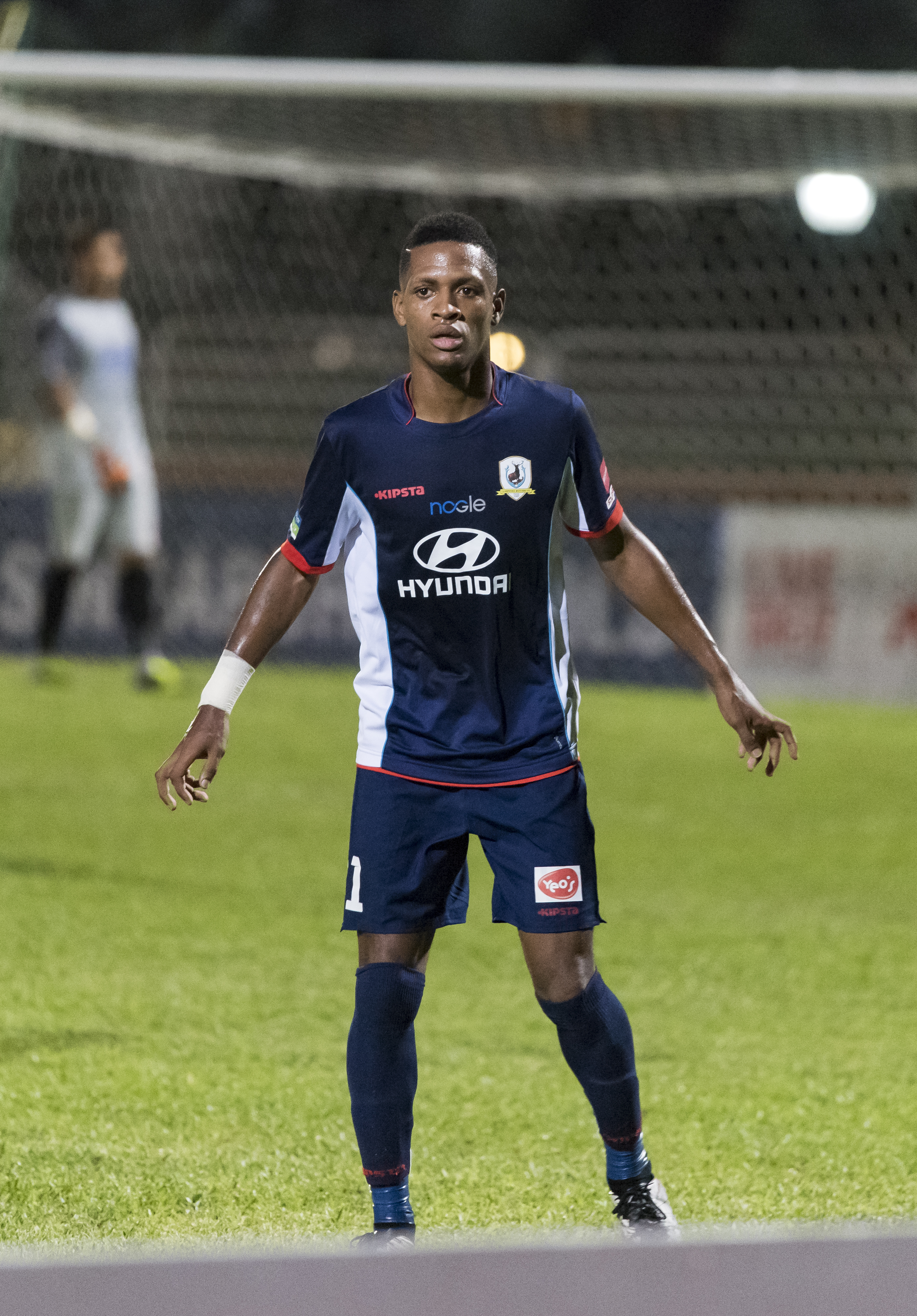
- Webb playing for Tampines Rovers in 2016

Personal information
- Date of birth: 24 March 1988 (age 38)
- Place of birth: Pickering, Ontario, Canada
- Height: 1.82 m (5 ft 11 1/2 in)
- Position: Winger

Youth career
- East York SC

College career
Years	Team	Apps	(Gls)
- Iowa Central CC Tritons

Senior career*
Years	Team	Apps	(Gls)
2007	Cleveland Internationals	6	(0)
2008	Springfield Demize	6	(0)
2009	Toronto Lynx	16	(5)
2009	Italia Shooters		
2010–2012	Hougang United	77	(33)
2013	Home United	24	(8)
2014–2016	Young Lions	39	(14)
2016	Tampines Rovers	22	(12)
2017	Warriors	23	(7)
2018–2020	Tampines Rovers	58	(27)
2021	Atlético Ottawa	0	(0)
2021–2022	Scarborough SC		
2022	Electric City FC	20	(3)
2023	Scarborough SC		
2023	ProStars FC	19	(8)
2024	Unionville Milliken SC	12	(2)
- * Club domestic league appearances and goals as of July 20, 2024

Jordan Webb (born 24 March 1988) is a Canadian professional soccer player who plays as a winger.

== Early and personal life ==
Webb attended Pine Ridge Secondary School. His cousin Anthony Bahadur is also a soccer player who suggested that Webb move to Singapore to play.

== Youth career ==
After playing youth soccer for the East York Komets in Toronto, Webb signed a two-year soccer scholarship in August 2007 with the Iowa Central Community College. During the college off season he played in the USL Premier Development League from 2007 till 2009 with the Cleveland Internationals, Springfield Demize, and Toronto Lynx. In 2009, he played for the Italia Shooters in the Canadian Soccer League.

== Club career ==
Webb began his professional career in 2010, playing for Hougang United on the recommendation of his cousin Anthony Bahadur and breaking a college scholarship in the process. He later played for Home United, Young Lions and Tampines Rovers. With Home United he won the 2013 Singapore Cup.

He helped himself to 14 goals and 11 assists in all competitions for Tampines in the 2016 S.League season, outshining the former Arsenal and Liverpool midfielder Jermaine Pennant, who was also playing for Tampines, in the process.

=== Warriors FC ===
Webb joined Warriors for the 2017 season. In March 2017, Webb claimed to be the victim of slanderous racial abuse in an S.League match, stating that Balestier Khalsa player Raihan Rahman had used a derogatory term against him. Webb scored six goals in his first seven outings for the Warriors but did not net in the S.League again until October in a 3–2 away defeat to Brunei DPMM.

=== Return to Tampines Rovers ===
Webb returned to former club Tampines Rovers after a season with Warriors FC for the 2018 Singapore Premier League season, with the Tampines Head Coach branding him as one of the best wingers in Singapore. He rejected an offer from a Portuguese 2nd tier side to re-sign for Tampines Rovers.

In his second season with the club, he helped the Stags win the 2019 Singapore Cup.

At the end of 2020, he left the club and Singapore and announced that he would be returning to Canada to continue his career.

=== Return to Canada ===
On 13 April 2021, Atlético Ottawa confirmed the signing of Webb for the upcoming season. On 27 July Ottawa announced that the club had terminated Webb's contract by mutual consent due to a "personal situation."

On 28 August 2021, Webb returned to the Canadian Soccer League to play with Scarborough SC and recorded two goals in his debut match against Toronto Tigers. He featured in the ProSound Cup final against FC Vorkuta but was defeated in a penalty shootout. He returned for a match on 5 June 2022, against Toronto Falcons where he recorded a goal.

In March 2022, he signed with Electric City FC of League1 Ontario.

In 2023, he joined ProStars FC. At the same time, he also played with Scarborough SC in the 2023 season, contributing a goal against the Serbian White Eagles on 15 July 2023. Throughout the 2023 campaign, he would help Scarborough secure the regular season title.

== International career ==
In November 2015, he announced his desire to represent Singapore at the international level, subject to receiving a Singaporean passport. He received permanent residency status in June 2017.

== Honours ==
Home United

- Singapore Cup: 2013

Tampines Rovers

- Singapore Cup: 2019

Scarborough SC

- Canadian Soccer League Regular Season: 2023
- ProSound Cup runner-up: 2021
