= Yasir Hanapi =

Singaporean footballer (born 1989)

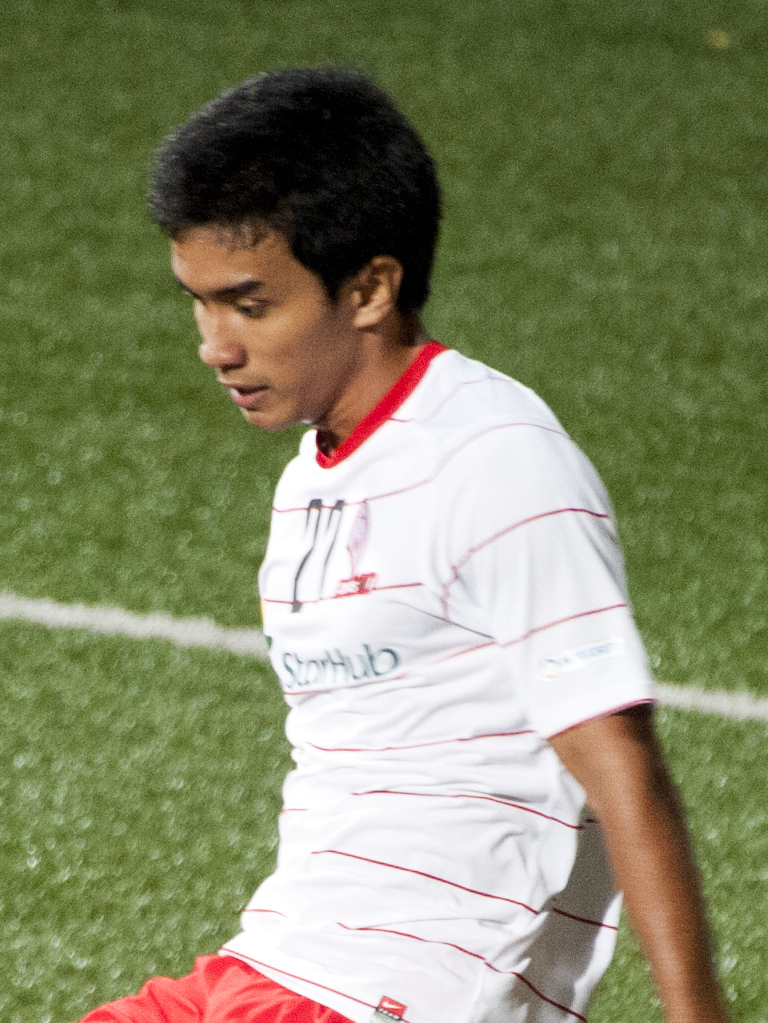
- Yasir in 2012

Personal information
- Full name: Muhammad Yasir bin Hanapi
- Date of birth: 21 June 1989 (age 37)
- Place of birth: Singapore
- Height: 1.70 m (5 ft 7 in)
- Positions: Midfielder; forward

Senior career*
Years	Team	Apps	(Gls)
2008–2011	Geylang United	48	(5)
2012	LionsXII	20	(0)
2013	Geylang International	24	(4)
2014–2015	Home United	50	(4)
2016–2017	Tampines Rovers	25	(5)
2017	PDRM	7	(1)
2018–2025	Tampines Rovers	156	(27)

International career^{‡}
2012–2022	Singapore	41	(1)
Medal record
Men's football
Representing Singapore
Sea Games
Bronze medal – third place	Nakhon Ratchasima 2007	Football
Bronze medal – third place	Vientiane 2009	Football
- * Club domestic league appearances and goals as of 22 November 2019 ‡ National team caps and goals as of 2 June 2022

Muhammad Yasir bin Hanapi (born 21 June 1989) is a Singaporean former professional footballer who plays either as a midfielder or forward.

Yasir originally played as a right-back but was converted to a right-winger when he played for LionsXII in 2012.

== Club career ==
=== Geylang United ===
Yasir started his career at Geylang United where he played from 2008 to 2012, before transferring to LionsXII.

=== LionsXII ===
In 2012, Yasir joined LionsXII which is competing in the 2012 Malaysia Super League.

=== Return to Geylang International ===
Thereafter, Yasir left for Geylang International in 2013.

=== Home United ===
In 2014, Yasir joined Home United.

=== Tampines Rovers ===
After a successful season with Home United, Yasir moved to Tampines Rovers in 2016. He scored his first goal for the stags in his first league match for his new club but was sent off after receiving two yellow cards. On 10 May 2016, with Tampines Rovers needing the win, he scored a curling shot from outside the box with his weak foot against Selangor in front of 11,875 fans which is the highest attendance record in the Group. Yasir secure the only goal in the match which guaranteed Tampines Rovers to qualified to the Round of 16 as group runners-ups.

In the 2017 S.League season, he made 16 appearances for the Stags in the league, scoring 5 goals in the process before leaving for PDRM.

=== PDRM FA ===
On 9 June 2017, Yasir joined national teammate Safuwan Baharudin at Malaysian second-tier side PDRM for the remainder of the Malaysia Premier League season. It was reported that no transfer fee was involved in the deal. He opened his account for the cops in a 3–1 loss to Perlis.

=== Return to Tampines Rovers ===
Following the conclusion of his contract with PDRM, Yasir rejoined former club Tampines Rovers for the 2018 S.League season.

Yasir was than made the club captain from the 2020 Singapore Premier League season onwards.

Yasir started the 2021 Singapore Premier League in blistering form, netting 3 goals in 3 games to help his team sit joint top of the table after 3 games in the season. On 25 June 2021, Yasir captained Tampines Rovers in their debut AFC Champions League campaign against Japanese club, Gamba Osaka.

On 16 December 2023, Tampines Rovers announced that Yasir will leave the club at the end of the 2023 season. However due to the injury list in the squad depth, Yasir signed a one year contract extensions on 25 April 2024. He also passed down his captaincy role to Syazwan Buhari.

== International career ==
Yasir was part of the Singapore national under-23 team that took part in the 2007 Southeast Asian Games in Korat, Thailand that won a bronze medal. He was also part of the team which repeated their bronze medal success in Vientiane, Laos in 2009.

Yasir was called up to the senior team for the first time in May 2015 for a series of friendly games against Bangladesh and Brunei.

On 13 November 2016, Yasir scored his first international goal on his 12th international cap in Singapore's final warm up match for the 2016 AFF Championship. He came off the bench to score the winner against Cambodia national football team, giving Singapore a narrow 1–0 win over the regional minnows.

=== Singapore Selection squad ===
Yasir was selected as part of the Singapore Selection squad for The Sultan of Selangor's Cup held on 6 May 2017.

== Personal life ==
Yasir younger brother, Yusril Hanapi is also a professional football who is currently playing for Tampines Rovers U21.

== Career statistics ==
=== Club ===
As of 16 December 2023

Club	Season	League			Singapore Cup		League Cup		Asia		Total	
Club	Season	Division	Apps	Goals	Apps	Goals	Apps	Goals	Apps	Goals	Apps	Goals
Geylang United	2009	S.League	24	4	0	0	0	0	0	0	24	4
Geylang United	2010	S.League	31	1	1	0	2	0	6	0	40	1
Geylang United	2011	S.League	11	1	0	0	0	0	0	0	11	1
Geylang United	Total		66	6	1	0	2	0	6	0	75	6
Home United	2011	S.League	6	1	1	0	0	0	0	0	7	1
Home United	Total		6	1	1	0	0	0	0	0	7	1
Club	Season	League			FA Cup		Malaysia Cup		Continental		Total	
Club	Season	Division	Apps	Goals	Apps	Goals	Apps	Goals	Apps	Goals	Apps	Goals
LionsXII	2012	Malaysia Super League	20	0	1	0	7	0	0	0	28	0
LionsXII	Total		20	0	1	0	7	0	0	0	28	0
Club	Season	League			Singapore Cup		League Cup		Asia		Total	
Club	Season	Division	Apps	Goals	Apps	Goals	Apps	Goals	Apps	Goals	Apps	Goals
Geylang International	2013	S.League	24	4	2	1	2	0	0	0	28	5
Geylang International	Total		24	4	2	1	2	0	0	0	28	5
Home United	2014	S.League	24	3	6	1	3	1	5	1	38	6
Home United	2015	S.League	26	1	4	0	2	0	0	0	32	1
Home United	Total		50	4	10	1	5	1	5	1	70	7
Tampines Rovers	2016	S.League	21	3	3	0	0	0	0	0	24	3
Tampines Rovers	Total		21	3	3	0	0	0	0	0	24	3
Club	Season	League			FA Cup		Malaysia Cup		Continental		Total	
Club	Season	Division	Apps	Goals	Apps	Goals	Apps	Goals	Apps	Goals	Apps	Goals
PDRM FA	2017	Malaysia Super League	7	1	0	0	0	0	0	0	7	1
PDRM FA	Total		7	1	0	0	0	0	0	0	7	1
Club	Season	League			Singapore Cup		League Cup		Asia		Total	
Club	Season	Division	Apps	Goals	Apps	Goals	Apps	Goals	Apps	Goals	Apps	Goals
Tampines Rovers	2017	S.League	9	2	0	0	0	0	7	3	16	5
Tampines Rovers	2018	Singapore Premier League	22	2	1	0	0	0	5	0	28	2
Tampines Rovers	2019	Singapore Premier League	21	3	5	1	0	0	6	1	32	5
Tampines Rovers	2020	Singapore Premier League	9	0	0	0	1	0	3	0	13	0
Tampines Rovers	2021	Singapore Premier League	20	6	0	0	0	0	5	0	25	6
Tampines Rovers	2022	Singapore Premier League	25	6	6	2	0	0	2	0	33	8
Tampines Rovers	2023	Singapore Premier League	21	7	4	1	0	0	1	0	26	8
Tampines Rovers	2024–25	Singapore Premier League	29	1	0	0	0	0	4	0	39	1
Tampines Rovers	Total		156	27	16	4	1	0	33	4	212	36
Career total			350	46	34	6	17	1	44	5	451	59

=== International ===
Score and Result list Singapore's goal tally first

No.	Date	Venue	Opponent	Score	Result	Competition	Ref.
1.	13 November 2016	Jalan Besar Stadium, Singapore	Cambodia	1–0	1–0	Friendly	

== Honours ==
=== Club ===
==== Geylang United ====
- Singapore Cup: 2009

==== Home United ====
- Singapore Cup: 2011

==== Tampines Rovers ====
- Singapore Cup: 2019
- Singapore Community Shield: 2020

=== Individual ===
- Southeast Asian Games Bronze Medal: 2007, 2009
