= Diego Silvas =

American soccer player (born 1997)

Thomas Diego Silvas
Personal information
- Full name: Thomas Diego Silvas
- Date of birth: September 25, 1997 (age 29)
- Place of birth: San Jose, California, United States
- Height: 1.80 m (5 ft 11 in)
- Position: Striker

Team information
- Current team: Tampines Rovers
- Number: 29

Youth career
- 2009–2011: PAC San Jose
- 2011–2013: Almaden Football Club
- 2012: San Jose Earthquakes
- 2013–2015: Seattle Sounders FC

Senior career*
Years	Team	Apps	(Gls)
2015	Seattle Sounders FC 2	7	(0)
2016–	Tampines Rovers	5	(2)
- * Club domestic league appearances and goals as of September 2, 2015

Thomas Diego Silvas (born September 25, 1997) is an American soccer player who currently plays for Tampines Rovers in the S.League. He is the son of Tom Silvas, the former United States international striker and renowned youth coach.

== Career ==
=== Early career ===
Silvas began his youth career with Almaden FC Mercury Green in California. In 2013, he decided to move to Seattle and join the Seattle Sounders FC Academy.

=== Seattle Sounders FC 2 ===
On May 30, 2015, Silvas made his professional debut for Seattle Sounders FC 2 in a 1–1 draw against Orange County Blues FC.

=== Tampines Rovers FC ===
Silvas signed for S.League giants Tampines Rovers FC in June 2016 as his father, Tom Silvas was commissioned by Tampines’ chairman Krishna Ramachandra to help make football more accessible to underprivileged youth. He made his debut and scored a brace for the Stags in the last game of the 2016 S.League season in a 5–1 win over newly crowned champions Albirex Niigata Singapore FC. Diego Silvas scored a free kick goal against Balestier Khalsa to equalise 2–2 in the first great eastern Hyundai prime league season opener game. Silvas was part of the first-team squad for the 2017 S.League season, as both a starter and substitute player.
