= Ivan Jakov Džoni =

Croatian footballer

Personal information
- Full name: Ivan Jakov Džoni
- Date of birth: 25 July 1994 (age 32)
- Place of birth: Split, Croatia
- Height: 1.80 m (5 ft 11 in)
- Position: Forward

Team information
- Current team: Sloga Mravince

Youth career
- 2005–2011: Hajduk Split

Senior career*
Years	Team	Apps	(Gls)
2011–2013	Hajduk Split	2	(0)
2013	Hajduk Split B	12	(5)
2013-2014	Cibalia	18	(1)
2014	Dugopolje	10	(2)
2015	Rudeš	28	(8)
2016	Dukla Banská Bystrica	15	(4)
2017	Tampines Rovers	18	(7)
2018	Imotski	14	(5)
2018–2019	Solin	15	(0)
2019	Junak Sinj	13	(1)
2019–2020	RNK Split	14	(4)
2020	Sloga Mravince	8	(0)

International career
2010	Croatia U17	7	(4)
- * Club domestic league appearances and goals as of 12:20, 27 September 2023 (UTC)

Ivan Jakov Džoni (Albanian: Xhoni; born 25 July 1994) is a retired Croatian football forward who last played for Sloga Mravince.

He is the son of Vilson Džoni, a former Hajduk player.

== Club career ==
Ivan Džoni joined Croatian football giants Hajduk Split's youth academy in 2005, aged only 12 years old. Throughout his years at Hajduk's youth academy, he was hailed as the new big thing. In the 2010/11 and 2011/12 seasons, he joined the club's senior team in their pre-season preparations. In the summer of 2011, English club Manchester City gave the youngster a 10-day trial at the club.

On 17 May 2013 he made his league debut for Hajduk in a 1–0 victory against NK Osijek. On 2 August 2015 Hajduk terminated his contract.

In February 2019, Džoni joined NK Junak Sinj.

=== Tampines Rovers ===
Dzoni signed for Tampines on 3 January 2017 for the 2017 S.League season. Dzoni made his league debut for Tampines in the 2017 Charity Shield, which doubles up as the league season's opener, in a 1–2 defeat for the Stags. He made a goal but missed a penalty after it was ordered to be retaken. He got his first league goal after successfully converting from the spot kick in the second game against Hougang United, to help the Stags get their first win of the season.

He got the stags back to winning ways, after a mid week 5–0 loss to Filipino side Ceres–Negros F.C. in the AFC Cup, by scoring the only goal in a 1–0 win over Balestier Khalsa FC in match day 3 of the 2017 S.League season. He, however, missed his 2nd penalty in 3 league games after Balestier goalkeeper Zaiful Nizam went the correct way.
