= 2021 Albirex Niigata Singapore FC season =

Albirex Niigata (S)
2021 season
- Chairman: Daisuke Korenaga
- Head coach: Keiji Shigetomi
- Stadium: Jurong East Stadium
- Premier League: 2nd

The 2021 season was Albirex Niigata Singapore FC's 18th consecutive season in the top flight of Singapore football and in the Singapore Premier League, having joined the league in 2004. The club competed only in 2021 Singapore Premier League, as Singapore Cup was not held in 2021.

== Squad ==
=== SPL Squad ===
As of 17 January 2021

Squad No.	Name	Nationality	Date of birth (age)	Previous club	Contract start	Contract end
Goalkeepers
1	Takahiro Koga	(Japan)	11 March 1999 (age 27)	(Japan) V-Varen Nagasaki	2021	2021
21	Hyrulnizam Juma'at ^{<23}	(Singapore)	14 November 1986 (age 40)	(Singapore) Warriors FC	2019	2021
40	Sunny Tia Yang Guang ^{U21}	(Singapore)	25 February 2004 (age 22)	Singapore Sports School	2021	2021
Defenders
3	Takahiro Tezuka	(Japan)	25 June 1998 (age 28)	(Japan) Tsukuba University	2021	2021
4	Shuya Yamashita	(Japan)	16 April 1998 (age 28)	(Japan) Tokoha University (J5)	2021	2021
5	Kazuki Hashioka (Captain) ^{<23}	(Japan)	20 January 1997 (age 29)	(Japan) Tokyo 23 FC (J5)	2020	2021
6	Yu Tokiwa	(Japan)	23 May 1998 (age 28)	(Japan) Niigata University of Health and Welfare	2021	2021
14	Yasuhiro Hanada	(Japan)	22 May 1999 (age 27)	Japan Soccer College	2020	2021
25	Reo Kunimoto	(Japan)	1 September 2001 (age 25)	(Japan) Renofa Yamaguchi FC (J2)	2021	2021
30	Kohga Tsuruhara	(Japan)	30 July 2000 (age 26)	(Japan) Ritsumeikan Moriyama HS	2021	2021
Midfielders
7	Ryoya Tanigushi	(Japan)	31 August 1999 (age 27)	(Japan) Zweigen Kanazawa (J2)	2020	2021
8	Kosuke Chiku	(Japan)	3 February 1999 (age 27)	(Japan) Tsukuba University	2021	2021
10	Ryosuke Nagasawa	(Japan)	25 September 1998 (age 28)	(Thailand) Phuket City F.C.	2020	2021
13	Mahiro Takahashi	(Japan)	26 June 2001 (age 25)	(Japan) Albirex Niigata U18	2020	2021
16	Makoto Ito	(Japan)	10 February 2000 (age 26)	(Japan) Chukyo University (J5)	2021	2021
23	Tsubasa Kawanishi	(Japan)	12 June 2002 (age 24)	(Japan) Kyushu International University HS	2021	2021
24	Hilman Norhisam ^{U21}	(Singapore)	5 May 2004 (age 22)	Singapore Sports School	2021	2021
27	Ong Yu En ^{U21}	(Singapore)	3 October 2003 (age 23)	(Singapore) FFA U16	2020	2021
29	Nicky Melvin Singh ^{U21}	(Singapore) (Philippines)	13 June 2002 (age 24)	(Singapore) Tampines Rovers U19	2021	2021
Strikers
9	Kiyoshiro Tsuboi	(Japan)	1 February 2000 (age 26)	(Japan) Tokushima Vortis (J1)	2021	2021
17	Fikri Junaidi ^{U21}	(Singapore)	2 April 2000 (age 26)	(Singapore) Young Lions FC	2021	2021
18	Fumiya Suzuki	(Japan)	29 April 1998 (age 28)	(Japan) Waseda University	2021	2021
20	Fairoz Hassan ^{<23}	(Singapore)	26 November 1988 (age 37)	(Singapore) Tiong Bahru FC (NFL)	2020	2021
31	Morrison Hashii	(Japan) (United Kingdom)	21 May 2001 (age 25)	(United Arab Emirates) Al Hilal United (U2)	2021	2021
32	Kuraba Kondo	(Japan)	6 July 2002 (age 24)	(Japan) Cerezo Osaka U-23 (J3)	2021	2021
Players who left club during season
24	Nathanael Chin ^{U21}	(Singapore)	26 April 1999 (age 27)	(Singapore) Police SA	2021	2021

== Coaching staff ==
Position	Name
Technical Director	(Japan) Kazuaki Yoshinaga
Head Coach	(Japan) Keiji Shigetomi
Asst Coach and U17 Coach	(Japan) Yuki Fujimoto
Coach	(Japan) Tomoya Ueta
U15 Coach	(Japan) Masayuki Kato
Goalkeeper Coach	(Singapore) Hyrulnizam Juma'at
Fitness Coach	(Singapore) Jaswinder Singh
Team Manager	(Singapore) Suzanna Foo
Physiotherapist	(Japan) Kikue Honda
Kitman	(Singapore) Roy Krishnan

== Transfer ==
=== In ===
Preseason

Position	Player	Transferred From	Ref
GK	(Japan) Takahiro Koga	(Japan) V-Varen Nagasaki (J2)	
GK	(Singapore) Sunny Tia Yang Guang	Singapore Sports School	
DF	(Japan) Kohga Tsuruhara	(Japan) Ritsumeikan Moriyama High School	
DF	(Japan) Yu Tokiwa	(Japan) Niigata University of Health and Welfare	
DF	(Japan) Shuya Yamashita	(Japan) Tokoha University	
DF	(Japan) Takahiro Tezuka	(Japan) Tsukuba University	
MF	(Japan) Makoto Ito	(Japan) Chukyo University	
MF	(Japan) Tsubasa Kawanishi	(Japan) Kyushu International University High School	
MF	(Japan) Kosuke Chiku	(Japan) Tsukuba University	
MF	(Japan) Fumiya Suzuki	(Japan) Waseda University	
FW	(Japan) (United Kingdom) Morrison Hashii	(United Arab Emirates) Al Hilal United (U2)	
FW	(Singapore) Nathanael Chin	(Singapore) Police SA (NFL)	
FW	(Singapore) Fikri Junaidi	(Singapore) Geylang International	
FW	(Japan) Kuraba Kondo	(Japan) Cerezo Osaka U-23 (J3)	

Mid-season

Position	Player	Transferred From	Ref
MF	(Singapore) Hilman Norhisam	Singapore Sports School	

=== Loan In ===
Preseason

Position	Player	Transferred From	Ref
DF	(Japan) Reo Kunimoto	(Japan) Renofa Yamaguchi FC (J2)	Season loan
MF	(Singapore) (Philippines) Nicky Melvin Singh	(Singapore) Tampines Rovers U19	Season loan
FW	(Japan) Kiyoshiro Tsuboi	(Japan) Tokushima Vortis (J1)	Season loan

=== Out ===
Preseason

Position	Player	Transferred To	Ref
GK	(Japan) Kei Okawa	(Japan)	
GK	(Singapore) Aizil Yazid	(Singapore) Hougang United	
DF	(Japan) Rio Sakuma	(Cambodia) Tiffy Army FC (C1)	
DF	(Japan) Hiromasa Ogino	(Japan)	
DF	(Japan) Kotaro Takeda	(Japan) FC Tiamo Hirakata (J4)	
DF	(Japan) Shoma Sato	(Japan)	
DF	(Japan) Toshihiko Masuda	(Japan)	
MF	(Japan) Ren Ishihara	(Japan) Tokushima Vortis (J1)	
MF	(Japan) Kenta Kurishima	(Japan) Iwate Grulla Morioka (J3)	
MF	(Japan) Hiroyoshi Kamata	(Japan) Fukui United FC (J6)	
MF	(Singapore) Iman Hakim	(Singapore) Tampines Rovers	
MF	(Singapore) Gareth Low Jun Kit	(Singapore) Balestier Khalsa	
MF	(Japan) Ryuya Mitsuzuka	(Japan) SC Sagamihara (J2)	Loan Return
FW	(Japan) Reo Nishiguchi	(Singapore) Tanjong Pagar United	
FW	(Japan) Tomoyuki Doi	(Singapore) Hougang United	
FW	(Japan) Yohei Osada		

Mid-season

Position	Player	Transferred To	Ref
FW	(Singapore) Nathanael Chin	(Singapore)	

=== Loan Out ===
Position	Player	Transferred To	Ref
MF	(Singapore) Zamani Zamri	(Singapore) Young Lions FC	NS till 2022
MF	(Singapore) Daniel Goh	(Singapore) SAFSA	NS till 2022

=== Retained / Extension / Promoted ===
Position	Player	Ref
GK	(Singapore) Hyrulnizam Juma'at	
DF	(Japan) Kazuki Hashioka	
DF	(Japan) Yasuhiro Hanada	
DF	(Singapore) Ameer Maricar	Promoted from U17 squad
DF	(Singapore) (Japan) Junki Kenn Yoshimura	Promoted from U17 squad
MF	(Singapore) (Japan) Kenji Austin	Promoted from U17 squad
MF	(Singapore) Ong Yu En	
MF	(Japan) Ryoya Tanigushi	Season loan from Zweigen Kanazawa
MF	(Japan) Mahiro Takahashi	Season loan from Albirex Niigata U18
FW	(Japan) Ryosuke Nagasawa	
FW	(Singapore) Fairoz Hassan	
FW	(Singapore) Ali Manaf	Promoted from U17 squad
FW	(Singapore) Irsyad Azarudin	Promoted from U17 squad

== Friendly ==
=== Pre-season friendlies ===
Win Draw Loss

6 March 2021 1	Tanjong Pagar United (Singapore)	0–1	(Japan) Albirex Niigata (S)	Jurong East Stadium
		Report	Nicky Melvin Singh 15'	Attendance: 0 (Note: Due to the COVID-19 pandemic, this match was played behind closed doors.)

=== In-season friendlies ===
Win Draw Loss

1 May 2021 1	Tanjong Pagar United (Singapore)	v	(Japan) Albirex Niigata (S)	Jurong East Stadium
				Attendance: 0

29 May 2021 2	Singapore U-22	4–2	(Japan) Albirex Niigata (S)	Jalan Besar Stadium
	Jacob Mahler; Ong Yu En			Attendance: 0

12 June 2021 3	Albirex Niigata (S) (Singapore)	v	(Singapore) Tampines Rovers	Geylang Field
				Attendance: 0

18 June 2021 4	Tanjong Pagar United (Singapore)	v	(Japan) Albirex Niigata (S)	Jurong East Stadium
				Attendance: 0

25 June 2021 5	Geylang International (Singapore)	2–0	(Singapore) Albirex Niigata (S)	Jalan Besar Stadium
	Iqram Rifqi; Abdil Qaiyyim Mutalib			Attendance: 0 (Note: Due to the COVID-19 pandemic, this match was played behind closed doors.)

3 July 2021 6	Lion City Sailors (Singapore)	v	(Japan) Albirex Niigata (S)	Jalan Besar Stadium
				Attendance: 0

10 July 2021 7	Albirex Niigata (S) (Singapore)	v	(Singapore) Hougang United	Jurong East Stadium
				Attendance: 0

16 July 2021 8	Albirex Niigata (S) (Singapore)	v	(Singapore) Hougang United	Jurong East Stadium
				Attendance: 0

== Team statistics ==
=== Appearances and goals ===
As at 17 Sept 2021

No.	Pos.	Player	Sleague		Total	
No.	Pos.	Player	Apps.	Goals	Apps.	Goals
1	GK	(Japan) Takahiro Koga	21	0	21	0
3	DF	(Japan) Takahiro Tezuka	20+1	5	21	5
4	DF	(Japan) Shuya Yamashita	21	3	21	3
5	DF	(Japan) Kazuki Hashioka	21	0	21	0
6	DF	(Japan) Yu Tokiwa	20+1	0	21	0
7	MF	(Japan) Ryoya Tanigushi	19	9	19	9
8	MF	(Japan) Kosuke Chiku	21	1	21	1
9	FW	(Japan) Kiyoshiro Tsuboi	10+3	15	13	15
10	MF	(Japan) Ryosuke Nagasawa	13+1	2	14	2
13	MF	(Japan) Mahiro Takahashi	0+9	0	9	0
14	DF	(Japan) Yasuhiro Hanada	0+14	1	14	1
16	MF	(Japan) Makoto Ito	0+5	1	5	1
17	FW	(Singapore) Fikri Junaidi	3	1	3	1
18	MF	(Japan) Fumiya Suzuki	0+6	1	6	1
20	FW	(Singapore) Fairoz Hassan	7+1	0	8	0
21	GK	(Singapore) Hyrulnizam Juma'at	0	0	0	0
23	MF	(Japan) Tsubasa Kawanishi	0+1	0	1	0
24	MF	(Singapore) Hilman Norhisam	0+1	0	1	0
25	DF	(Japan) Reo Kunimoto	20	2	20	2
27	MF	(Singapore) Ong Yu En	18	0	18	0
29	MF	(Singapore) Nicky Melvin Singh	13	1	13	1
30	DF	(Japan) Kohga Tsuruhara	0+1	0	1	0
31	FW	(Japan) (United Kingdom) Morrison Hashii	0+1	0	1	0
32	FW	(Japan) Kuraba Kondo	3+13	8	16	8
40	GK	(Singapore) Sunny Tia Yang Guang	0	0	0	0
41	MF	(Singapore) (Japan) Kenji Austin	0	0	0	0
42	FW	(Singapore) Ali Manaf	0	0	0	0
43	FW	(Singapore) Irsyad Azarudin	0	0	0	0
44	DF	(Singapore) Ameer Maricar	0	0	0	0
45	DF	(Singapore) (Japan) Junki Kenn Yoshimura	1	0	1	0
Players who have played this season but had left the club or on loan to other club
24	FW	(Singapore) Nathanael Chin	0	0	0	0

== Competitions ==
=== Charity Shield ===
19 June 2021 Charity Shield	Albirex Niigata (S) (Japan)	cancelled	(Singapore) Tampines Rovers	Jalan Besar Stadium
				Attendance: 0

=== Singapore Premier League ===
Win Draw Loss

13 March 2021 1	Albirex Niigata (S) (Japan)	3–1	(Singapore) Hougang United	Jurong East Stadium
	Kiyoshiro Tsuboi 25' 85'; Takahiro Tezuka 39'; Ryoya Tanigushi (yellow card) 78'; Daniel Bennett (yellow card) 90+4'	Report	Jarrel Ong Jia Wei 42'; Idraki Adnan (yellow card) 24'; Kaishu Yamazaki (yellow card) 44'; Hafiz Sujad (yellow card) 78'; Farhan Zulkifli (yellow card) 80'	Attendance: 0 Referee: Muhammad Taqi

17 March 2021 2	Young Lions FC (Singapore)	0–3	(Japan) Albirex Niigata (S)	Jalan Besar Stadium
	Syed Akmal (yellow card) 4'; Zamani Zamri (yellow card) 65'	Report	Ryoya Tanigushi 17'; Makoto Ito 51'; Kiyoshiro Tsuboi 79' (yellow card) 65'	Attendance: 0 Referee: Taufik Thana

21 March 2021 3	Albirex Niigata (S) (Japan)	0–0	(Singapore) Balestier Khalsa	Jurong East Stadium
			Sime Zuzul (yellow card) 90+5'	Attendance: 0 Referee: Syarqawi Buhari

4 April 2021 4	Albirex Niigata (S) (Japan)	1–0	(Singapore) Geylang International	Jurong East Stadium
	Takahiro Tezuka 33'; Kazuki Hashioka (yellow card) 25'; Ryoya Tanigushi (yellow card) 38'; Reo Kunimoto (yellow card) 50'	Report	Harith Kanadi (yellow card) 70'	Attendance: 0 Referee: Zulfiqar Mustaffa

7 April 2021 5	Lion City Sailors (Singapore)	2–2	(Japan) Albirex Niigata (S)	Jalan Besar Stadium
	Stipe Plazibat 45' (penalty missed) 85; Jorge Fellipe 87'; Shahdan Sulaiman (yellow card) 55'; Aqhari Abdullah (yellow card) 80'; Saifullah Akbar (yellow card) 90'	Report	Shuya Yamashita 17' 42' (yellow card) 80'; Ryoya Tanigushi (yellow card) 84'	Attendance: 0 Referee: Ahmad A'qashah

11 April 2021 6	Albirex Niigata (S) (Japan)	2–1	(Singapore) Tampines Rovers	Jurong East Stadium
	Ryoya Tanigushi 21'; Kuraba Kondo 63'; Fairoz Hasan (yellow card) 18'; Kiyoshiro Tsuboi (yellow card) 18'; Yu Tokiwa (yellow card) 74'	Report	Boris Kopitović 9'; Yasir Hanapi (yellow card) 73'; Shah Shahiran (yellow card) 85'	Attendance: 0 Referee: Juherman Zaiton

17 April 2021 7	Tanjong Pagar United (Singapore)	0–6	(Japan) Albirex Niigata (S)	Jurong East Stadium
	Blake Ricciuto (yellow card) 23'; Shahrin Saberin (yellow card) 44'; Ammirul Emmran (yellow card) 45'; Faritz Hameed (yellow card) 70'	Report	Kiyoshiro Tsuboi 32' 37' 41'; Kuraba Kondo 62' 88'; Ryoya Tanigushi 68'; Shuya Yamashita (yellow card) 80'	Attendance: 0 Referee: Abirami Naidu

15 May 2021 8	Albirex Niigata (S) (Japan)	2–1	(Singapore) Young Lions FC	Jurong East Stadium
	Nicky Melvin Singh 3'; Fumiya Suzuki 49'	Report	Joel Chew 19'	Attendance: 0 Referee: Y.Sathyakumar

25 April 2021 9 (Rescheduled)	Balestier Khalsa (Singapore)	1–4	(Japan) Albirex Niigata (S)	Toa Payoh Stadium
	Šime Žužul 57'; Ensar Brunčević (yellow card) 27'	Report	Kiyoshiro Tsuboi 28' (pen.) 47' 87'; Kuraba Kondo 53'	Attendance: 0 Referee: Zulfiqar Mustaffa

23 May 2021 10	Geylang International (Singapore)	1–2	(Japan) Albirex Niigata (S)	Our Tampines Hub
	Matheus Moresche 46'; Elijah Lim Teck Yong (yellow card) 37'	Report	Kosuke Chiku 14'; Takahiro Tezuka 66'; Makoto Ito (yellow card) 87'	Attendance: 0 Referee: Abirami Naidu

8 May 2021 11 (Rescheduled)	Tampines Rovers (Singapore)	2–2	(Japan) Albirex Niigata (S)	Our Tampines Hub
	Boris Kopitović 53' 90+6' (pen.); Zehrudin Mehmedović (yellow card) 74'; Baihakki Khaizan (yellow card) 79'; Daniel Bennett (yellow card) 90+6' (yellow-red card) 90+7'	Report	Kiyoshiro Tsuboi 35' 49'; Ryoya Tanigushi (yellow card) 31'; Yu Tokiwa (yellow card) 56'	Attendance: 0 Referee: Farhad Mohamed

23 July 2021 12 (Rescheduled)	Albirex Niigata (S) (Japan)	1–1	(Singapore) Lion City Sailors	Jurong East Stadium
	Ryoya Tanigushi 45' (pen.); Reo Kunimoto (yellow card) 70'	Report	Stipe Plazibat 72'	Attendance: 100; Referee: Nathan Chan

30 July 2021 13 (Rescheduled)	Hougang United (Japan)	1–2	(Singapore) Albirex Niigata (S)	Hougang Stadium
	Kishon Philip 30'; Hafiz Sujad (yellow card) 77'; Maksat Dzhakybaliev (yellow card) 89'	Report	Kuraba Kondo 51'; Takahiro Tezuka 65'; Ryoya Tanigushi (yellow card) 90+5'	Referee: Syarqawi Buhari

6 August 2021 14 (Rescheduled)	Albirex Niigata (S) (Japan)	1–2	(Singapore) Tanjong Pagar United	Jurong East Stadium
	Shuya Yamashita 80'	Report	Reo Nishiguchi 34'; Luiz Júnior 84'; Anaqi Ismit (yellow card) 50'	Referee: Taufik Thana

13 August 2021 15 (Rescheduled)	Albirex Niigata (S) (Japan)	4–1	(Singapore) Hougang United	Jurong East Stadium
	Reo Kunimoto 2' 78'; Yasuhiro Hanada 89'; Takahiro Tezuka 90+1'	Report	Takahiro Tezuka 82' (o.g.); Maksat Dzhakybaliev (yellow card) 22'; Nazrul Nazari (yellow card) 30'; Anders Aplin (yellow card) 40'	Referee: Ahmad A'qashah

22 August 2021 16 (Rescheduled)	Young Lions FC (Singapore)	0–1	(Japan) Albirex Niigata (S)	Jalan Besar Stadium
	Rezza Rezky (yellow card) 38'; Jacob Mahler (yellow card) 52'	Report	Ryosuke Nagasawa 3' (pen.); Ong Yu En (yellow card) 45'; Shuya Yamashita (yellow card) 59'	Referee: Abirami Naidu

28 August 2021 17 (Rescheduled)	Albirex Niigata (S) (Japan)	4–0	(Singapore) Balestier Khalsa	Jurong East Stadium
	Ryoya Tanigushi 47' 77'; Kuraba Kondo 51' 65'; Kazuki Hashioka (yellow card) 5'	Report	Gareth Low (yellow card) 30'; Ho Wai Loon (yellow card) 59'	Referee: Farhad Mohamed

11 September 2021 18 (Rescheduled)	Albirex Niigata (S) (Japan)	5–0	(Singapore) Geylang International	Jurong East Stadium
	Fikri Junaidi 30'; Ryosuke Nagasawa 60'; Ryoya Tanigushi 79' 88'; Kuraba Kondo 90' (yellow card) 82'; Kazuki Hashioka (yellow card) 52'	Report	Afiq Yunos (yellow card) 3'; Abdil Qaiyyim Mutalib (yellow card) 52'; Ilhan Noor (yellow card) 56'; Yuki Ichikawa (yellow card) 85'	Referee: Jansen Foo

17 September 2021 19 (Rescheduled)	Lion City Sailors (Singapore)	1–1	(Japan) Albirex Niigata (S)	Jalan Besar Stadium
	Haiqal Pashia 25'	Report	Ryoya Tanigushi 90+4'; Kiyoshiro Tsuboi (yellow card) 61'	Attendance: 1000; Referee: Zulfiqar Mustaffa

24 September 2021 20 (Rescheduled)	Albirex Niigata (S) (Japan)	0–0	(Singapore) Tampines Rovers	Jurong East Stadium
		Report	Zehrudin Mehmedovic (yellow card) 44'	Referee: Juherman Zaiton

10 October 2021 21 (Rescheduled)	Tanjong Pagar United (Singapore)	4–4	(Japan) Albirex Niigata (S)	Jurong East Stadium
	Anaqi Ismit 12' 73'; Fathullah Rahmat 59' (yellow card) 63'; Reo Nishiguchi 87'; Shakir Hamzah (yellow card) 20'; Shahrin Saberin (yellow card) 23'	Report	Kiyoshiro Tsuboi 20' 23' (pen.) 44' 45+2'	Referee: Jansen Foo

Pos	Team	Pld	W	D	L	GF	GA	GD	Pts	Qualification or relegation
1	Lion City Sailors	21	14	6	1	59	21	+38	48	Qualification for AFC Champions League group stage
2	Albirex Niigata (S) (Note: The foreign club – Albirex Niigata (S) – as well as the Football Association of Singapore (FAS) under-21 team, Young Lions, are ineligible for any AFC competition spots.)	21	13	7	1	50	19	+31	46	
3	Hougang United	21	10	4	7	48	40	+8	34	Qualification for AFC Cup group stage
4	Tampines Rovers	21	7	6	8	48	51	−3	27	Qualification for AFC Cup group stage
5	Tanjong Pagar United	21	5	7	9	36	49	−13	22	

Updated to match(es) played on 3 April 2021. Source: Singapore Premier League
Rules for classification: 1) points; 2) goal difference; 3) number of goals scored; 4) number of wins

=== Singapore Cup ===
Given the later completion date of the League, the Singapore Cup 2021 will be cancelled to ensure the Singapore Under-22s and the National team can adequately prepare for their respective competitions.
