= 2021 Geylang International FC season =

Geylang International
2021 season
- Chairman: Ben Teng
- Head coach: Mohd Noor Ali
- Stadium: Our Tampines Hub
Home colours	Away colours

The 2021 season was Geylang International's 26th consecutive season in the top flight of Singapore football and in the Singapore Premier League. Along with the Singapore Premier League, the club also competed in the Singapore Cup.

== Season Progress Key Milestones ==
1. In March 2021, Zikos Chua is ruled out of the season after enlistment to NS.
2. In April 2021, Nur Luqman Rahman is ruled out of the season after suffering an anterior cruciate ligament (ACL) injury in match against Tampines Rovers on 16 April 2021.
3. In May 2021, Sylvano Comvalius agreed to mutually terminate his contract with the Eagles after feeling homesick. His family application to join him in Singapore was rejected due to COVID-19.
4. In May 2021, Ex-Malaysia Cup star Abbas Saad returns to Singapore for short coaching stint, joining the Eagle as Noor Ali's assistant.

== Squad ==
=== Singapore Premier League ===
No.	Name	Nationality	Date of birth (age)	Previous club	Contract since	Contract end
Goalkeepers
1	Hairul Syirhan	(Singapore)	21 August 1995 (age 31)	(Singapore) Young Lions FC	2019	2021
30	Zaiful Nizam ^{>30}	(Singapore)	24 July 1987 (age 39)	(Singapore) Balestier Khalsa	2021	2023
Defenders
2	Adam Hakeem	(Singapore)	17 March 1997 (age 29)	(Singapore) Young Lions FC	2020	2021
3	Ilhan Noor ^{U23}	(Singapore)	19 December 2002 (age 23)	Youth Team	2019	2021
5	Darren Teh	(Singapore)	9 September 1996 (age 30)	(Singapore) SAFSA (NFL)	2017	2021
15	Faizal Roslan	(Singapore)	30 May 1995 (age 31)	(Singapore) Lion City Sailors	2021	2021
21	Yuki Ichikawa (Captain)	(Japan)	29 August 1987 (age 39)	(Singapore) Albirex Niigata (S)	2014	2021
27	Abdil Qaiyyim Mutalib ^{>30}	(Singapore)	14 May 1989 (age 37)	(Singapore) Lion City Sailors	2021	2021
28	Afiq Yunos ^{>30}	(Singapore)	10 December 1990 (age 35)	(Singapore) Hougang United	2021	2021
Midfielders
4	Danny Kim	(Australia) (South Korea)	28 May 1998 (age 28)	(Australia) Brisbane Roar FC Youth	2021	2021
6	Umar Ramle	(Singapore)	2 May 1996 (age 30)	Youth Team	2016	2021
8	Barry Maguire	(Netherlands) (Republic of Ireland)	27 October 1989 (age 37)	(Republic of Ireland) Limerick F.C.	2019	2021
13	Izzdin Shafiq ^{>30}	(Singapore)	14 December 1990 (age 35)	(Singapore) Lion City Sailors	2021	2021
14	Asshukrie Wahid ^{U23}	(Singapore)	27 February 1998 (age 28)	(Singapore) Young Lions FC	2021	2021
17	Firdaus Kasman ^{>30}	(Singapore)	24 January 1988 (age 38)	(Singapore) Warriors FC	2019	2021
18	Azri Suhaili ^{U23}	(Singapore)	12 July 2002 (age 24)	Youth Team	2019	2021
22	Christopher van Huizen	(Singapore)	28 November 1992 (age 33)	(Singapore) Home United	2019	2021
24	Iqram Rifqi	(Singapore)	25 February 1996 (age 30)	(Singapore) Lion City Sailors	2021	2021
26	Furqan Raoff ^{U21}	(Singapore)	26 March 2002 (age 24)	Youth Team	2019	2021
Forwards
7	Amy Recha	(Singapore) (Indonesia)	13 May 1992 (age 34)	(Singapore) Home United	2019	2021
10	Matheus Moresche	(Brazil)	24 June 1998 (age 28)	(Belarus) FC Torpedo	2021	2021
16	Idris Sadlizan ^{U23}	(Singapore)	21 August 1998 (age 28)	(Singapore) MOF F.C.	2021	2021
19	Fareez Farhan	(Singapore)	29 July 1994 (age 32)	(Singapore) Hougang United	2019	2021
Players on NS / loaned out or left during season
	Joshua Pereira	(Singapore)	10 October 1997 (age 29)	(Singapore) Young Lions FC	2020	2020
	Noor Ariff ^{U23}	(Singapore)	6 September 1998 (age 28)	Youth Team	2017	2020
	Ifwat Ismail	(Singapore)	27 March 1997 (age 29)	(Singapore) Young Lions FC	2019	2019
23	Wayne Chew ^{U23}	(Singapore)	22 October 2001 (age 25)	Youth Team	2019	2021
11	Harith Kanadi ^{U23}	(Singapore)	1 August 2000 (age 26)	(Singapore) Tampines Rovers U19	2019	2023
20	Nur Luqman ^{U23}	(Singapore) (Indonesia)	20 June 1998 (age 28)	(Singapore) Young Lions FC	2020	2021
47	Zikos Vasileios Chua ^{U21}	(Singapore) (Greece)	15 April 2002 (age 24)	(Singapore) NFA U16	2018	2021
49	Elijah Lim Teck Yong ^{U21}	(Singapore)	8 May 2001 (age 25)	(Singapore) Balestier Khalsa	2021	2021
9	Sylvano Comvalius	(Netherlands) (Suriname)	10 August 1987 (age 39)	(Malta) Sliema Wanderers F.C.	2021	2021
42	Sanders Saurajen ^{U21}	(Singapore)	20 June 2000 (age 26)	Youth Team	2021	2021
25	Zainol Gulam	(Singapore)	4 February 1992 (age 34)	(Singapore) Warriors FC	2018	2021

== Coaching staff ==
Position	Name	Ref.
Chairman	(Singapore) Thomas Gay	
General manager	(Singapore) Andrew Ang	
Assistant general manager	(Singapore) Leonard Koh	
Head coach	(Singapore) Mohd Noor Ali	
Assistant coach	(Australia) (Lebanon) Abbas Saad	
Head of Youth	(Singapore)	
U17 Coach	(Singapore) Azlan Alipah	
U15 Coach	(Singapore) (Germany) Sabrina Mathe	
Fitness Coach	(Singapore) Muhammad Razif Ariff	
Goalkeeping Coach	(Singapore) Yusri Aziz	
Team Manager	(Singapore)	
Physiotherapist	(Singapore) [[]]	
Kitman	(Singapore) Abdul Latiff	
Sports Scientist	(Singapore) Andi Agus	
Sports Trainer	(Singapore) Benjamin Singh	

== Transfers ==
=== In ===
Pre-season

Position	Player	Transferred From	Ref
DF	(Singapore) Danish Irfan	(Singapore) Young Lions FC	Loan Return
FW	(Singapore) Fikri Junaidi	(Singapore) Young Lions FC	Loan Return
MF	(Singapore) Izzdin Shafiq	(Singapore) Lion City Sailors	Free
MF	(Singapore) Elijah Lim Teck Yong	(Singapore) Balestier Khalsa	Free
FW	(Brazil) Matheus Moresche	(Latvia) Riga FC	Free
FW	(Netherlands) (Suriname) Sylvano Comvalius	(Malta) Sliema Wanderers F.C.	Free
FW	(Singapore) Idris Sadlizan	Free Agent	

Note 1: Danish Irfan was loaned to Young Lions FC for 2021 season.

Note 2: Fikri Junaidi was released and joined Albirex Niigata for 2021 season.

Mid-season

Position	Player	Transferred From	Ref
GK	(Singapore) Zaiful Nizam	(Singapore) Balestier Khalsa	Free,2.5year contract
DF	(Singapore) Afiq Yunos	(Singapore) Hougang United	Free, 6 months contract
DF	(Singapore) Abdil Qaiyyim Mutalib	(Singapore) Lion City Sailors FC	Undisclosed
MF	(Australia) (South Korea) Danny Kim	(Australia) Brisbane Roar FC Youth	Free
MF	(Singapore) Asshukrie Wahid	Free Agent	NA

=== Loan In ===
Pre-season

Position	Player	Transferred from	Ref
DF	(Singapore) Faizal Roslan	(Singapore) Lion City Sailors	Season loan
MF	(Singapore) Iqram Rifqi	(Singapore) Lion City Sailors	Season loan

=== Out ===
Pre-season

Position	Player	Transferred To	Ref
FW	(Singapore) Ifwat Ismail	(Singapore) SAFSA	NS till 2021
MF	(Singapore) Joshua Pereira	(Singapore) SAFSA	NS till 2022
MF	(Singapore) Noor Ariff	(Singapore) SAFSA	NS till 2022
GK	(Singapore) Dylan Christopher Goh	(Singapore) Tampines Rovers U19	
FW	(Singapore) Iqbal Hussain	(India) Chennai City F.C.	Free
DF	(Singapore) Shahrin Saberin	(Singapore) Tanjong Pagar United	Free
DF	(Singapore) Nurullah Hussein	(Singapore)	Free
DF	(Kyrgyzstan) Kamolidin Tashiev	(Kyrgyzstan) FC Abdysh-Ata Kant	Free
DF	(Singapore) Danish Qayyum	(Singapore) Young Lions FC	Free
MF	(Singapore) Safirul Sulaiman	(Singapore)	Free
FW	(Singapore) Khairul Nizam	(Singapore) Hougang United	Free
FW	(Singapore) Fikri Junaidi	(Singapore) Albirex Niigata (S)	Free

Mid-season

Position	Player	Transferred To	Ref
GK	(Singapore) Wayne Chew	(Singapore) SAFSA	NS till 2023
DF	(Singapore) Harith Kanadi	(Singapore) SAFSA	NS till 2023
MF	(Singapore) Elijah Lim Teck Yong	(Singapore) SAFSA	NS till 2023
MF	(Singapore) Nur Luqman	(Singapore) SAFSA	NS till 2023
FW	(Singapore) (Greece) Zikos Vasileios Chua	(Singapore) SAFSA	NS till 2023
FW	(Netherlands) (Suriname) Sylvano Comvalius	(Netherlands) Quick Boys (N3)	
GK	(Singapore) Sanders Saurajen		Free (Pursue study)
GK	(Singapore) Zainol Gulam		Retired

=== Loan Out ===
Pre-season

Position	Player	Transferred from	Ref
GK	(Singapore) Dylan Pereira	(Singapore) Young Lions FC	Season loan
DF	(Singapore) Danish Irfan	(Singapore) Young Lions FC	Season loan

=== Extension / Retained ===
Position	Player	Ref
GK	(Singapore) Hairul Syirhan	
GK	(Singapore) Wayne Chew	
GK	(Singapore) Zainol Gulam	
DF	(Singapore) Adam Hakeem	
DF	(Japan) Yuki Ichikawa	
DF	(Singapore) Darren Teh	
DF	(Singapore) Harith Kanadi	
MF	(Singapore) Umar Ramle	
MF	(Singapore) Azri Suhaili	
MF	(Singapore) Firdaus Kasman	
MF	(Singapore) Nur Luqman	
MF	(Singapore) Christopher van Huizen	2 years contract signed in 2019
MF	(Netherlands) (Republic of Ireland) Barry Maguire	
FW	(Singapore) (Greece) Zikos Vasileios Chua	
FW	(Singapore) Amy Recha	
FW	(Singapore) Fareez Farhan	

== Friendlies ==
=== Pre-season friendlies ===
Win Draw Loss

6 March 2021 1	Geylang International (Singapore)	2–1	(Singapore) Balestier Khalsa	Our Tampines Hub
	Christopher van Huizen; Zikos Vasileios Chua		Joshua De Souza	Attendance: 0 (Note: Due to Covid 19, this match is played behind closed doors.)

=== In-season friendlies ===
Win Draw Loss

19 March 2021 1	Geylang International (Singapore)	v	(Singapore) Young Lions FC	Our Tampines Hub
				Attendance: 0

8 June 2021 2	Geylang International (Singapore)	2–3	(Singapore) Hougang United	Our Tampines Hub
	Asshukrie Wahid; Moresche		Gilberto Fortunato (pen.); Shahril Ishak; Tomoyuki Doi	Attendance: 0

19 June 2021 3	Geylang International (Singapore)	4–0	(Singapore) Young Lions FC	Jalan Besar Stadium
				Attendance: 0

25 June 2021 4	Geylang International (Singapore)	2–0	(Singapore) Albirex Niigata (S)	Jalan Besar Stadium
	Iqram Rifqi; Abdil Qaiyyim Mutalib			Attendance: 0

16 July 2021 5	Lion City Sailors (Singapore)	3–0	(Singapore) Geylang International	Jalan Besar Stadium
	Diego Lopes			Attendance: 0

== Team statistics ==
=== Appearances and goals ===
As of 25 August 2021.

No.	Pos.	Player	Sleague		AFC Cup		Total	
No.	Pos.	Player	Apps.	Goals	Apps.	Goals	Apps.	Goals
1	GK	(Singapore) Hairul Syirhan	4+1	0	0	0	5	0
2	DF	(Singapore) Adam Hakeem	1+1	0	0	0	2	0
3	DF	(Singapore) Ilhan Noor	10	2	0	0	10	2
4	MF	(Australia) (South Korea) Danny Kim	8+2	1	0	0	10	1
5	DF	(Singapore) Darren Teh	11+2	0	0	0	13	0
6	MF	(Singapore) Umar Ramle	1+5	0	0	0	6	0
7	FW	(Singapore) (Indonesia) Amy Recha	18+3	12	0	0	21	12
8	MF	(Netherlands) (Republic of Ireland) Barry Maguire	16	0	0	0	16	0
10	FW	(Brazil) Matheus Moresche	17+4	11	0	0	21	11
13	MF	(Singapore) Izzdin Shafiq	9+6	0	0	0	15	0
14	MF	(Singapore) Asshukrie Wahid	7	0	0	0	0	0
15	DF	(Singapore) Faizal Roslan	11+4	1	0	0	15	1
17	MF	(Singapore) Firdaus Kasman	13	0	0	0	13	0
18	MF	(Singapore) Azri Suhaili	4+2	0	0	0	6	0
19	FW	(Singapore) Fareez Farhan	5+9	0	0	0	14	0
21	DF	(Japan) Yuki Ichikawa	19	0	0	0	19	0
22	MF	(Singapore) Christopher van Huizen	7+12	1	0	0	19	1
24	MF	(Singapore) Iqram Rifqi	2+5	0	0	0	7	0
27	DF	(Singapore) Abdil Qaiyyim Mutalib	6+1	0	0	0	7	0
28	DF	(Singapore) Afiq Yunos	6	0	0	0	6	0
30	GK	(Singapore) Zaiful Nizam	3	0	0	0	3	0
Players who have played this season but had left the club or on loan to other club
9	FW	(Netherlands) (Suriname) Sylvano Comvalius	4+3	2	0	0	7	2
11	DF	(Singapore) Harith Kanadi	16	0	0	0	16	0
20	MF	(Singapore) (Indonesia) Nur Luqman	4	0	0	0	4	0
23	GK	(Singapore) Wayne Chew	5	0	0	0	5	0
25	GK	(Singapore) Zainol Gulam	6+1	0	0	0	7	0
42	GK	(Singapore) Sanders Saurajen	2	0	0	0	2	0
47	FW	(Singapore) (Greece) Zikos Vasileios Chua	2	0	0	0	2	0
49	MF	(Singapore) Elijah Lim Teck Yong	13	0	0	0	13	0

== Competitions ==
=== Overview ===
Competition	Record							
Competition	P	W	D	L	GF	GA	GD	Win %

=== Singapore Premier League ===
Win Draw Loss

14 March 2021 1	Geylang International (Singapore)	2–1	(Singapore) Tanjong Pagar United	Our Tampines Hub
	Matheus Moresche 18' (pen.) 74'; Amy Recha (yellow card) 49'	Report	Blake Ricciuto 21' (yellow card) 41'; Delwinder Singh (yellow card) 38'; Luiz Júnior (yellow card) 39'; Ammirul Emmran (yellow card) 62'	Attendance: 0 Referee: Lim Liang Yi

17 March 2021 2	Hougang United (Singapore)	4–1	(Singapore) Geylang International	Hougang Stadium
	Tomoyuki Doi 10' 51' (pen.); Hafiz Sujad 80'; Gilberto Fortunato 83'; Farhan Zulkifli (yellow card) 55'; Shawal Anuar (yellow card) 74'; Lionel Tan (yellow card) 85'	Report	Amy Recha 4'; Faizal Roslan (yellow card) 51'	Attendance: 0 Referee: Nathan Chan

20 March 2021 3	Geylang International (Singapore)	1–1	(Singapore) Young Lions FC	Our Tampines Hub
	Sylvano Comvalius 34'; Firdaus Kasman (yellow card) 58'	Report	Hami Syahin (yellow card) 24'; Khairin Nadim 61' (yellow card) 30'; Danish Irfan Azman (yellow card) 70'	Attendance: 0 Referee: Jansen Foo

4 April 2021 4	Albirex Niigata (S) (Japan)	1–0	(Singapore) Geylang International	Jurong East Stadium
	Takahiro Tezuka 33'; Kazuki Hashioka (yellow card) 25'; Ryoya Tanigushi (yellow card) 38'; Reo Kunimoto (yellow card) 50'	Report	Harith Kanadi (yellow card) 70'	Attendance: 0 Referee: Zulfiqar Mustaffa

7 April 2021 5	Balestier Khalsa (Singapore)	2–1	(Singapore) Geylang International	Toa Payoh Stadium
	Kristijan Krajcek 36'; Ensar Brunčević 45+1' (yellow card) 57'; Amer Hakeem (yellow card) 39'; Ahmad Syahir (yellow card) 81'; Shuhei Hoshino (yellow card) 90+1'; Hazzuwan Halim (yellow card) 90+3'	Report	Amy Recha 53' (yellow card) 57'	Attendance: 0 Referee: Taufik Thana

11 April 2021 6	Geylang International (Singapore)	0–8	(Singapore) Lion City Sailors	Our Tampines Hub
	Darren Teh (yellow card) 41'; Yuki Ichikawa (yellow card) 49'; Fareez Farhan (yellow card) 50'	Report	Gabriel Quak 7' 60'; Diego Lopes 18' 37' 90+2'; Saifullah Akbar 30'; Stipe Plazibat 67' 77'	Attendance: 0 Referee: Lim Liang Yi

16 April 2021 7	Tampines Rovers (Singapore)	3–2	(Singapore) Geylang International	Our Tampines Hub
	Zehrudin Mehmedović 32' (pen.); Boris Kopitović 51'; Taufik Suparno 79'	Report	Matheus Moresche 50' 62'; Firdaus Kasman (yellow card) 34'; Harith Kanadi (yellow card) 89'	Attendance: 0 Referee: Ahmad A'qashah

9 May 2021 8	Lion City Sailors (Singapore)	2–1	(Singapore) Geylang International	Jalan Besar Stadium
	Stipe Plazibat 21'; Saifullah Akbar 57'; Jorge Fellipe (yellow card) 30'; Shahdan Sulaiman (yellow card) 90+2'	Report	Matheus Moresche 27'; Ilhan Noor (yellow card) 3'; Firdaus Kasman (yellow card) 12'; Christopher van Huizen (yellow card) 71'; Barry Maguire (yellow card) 82'	Attendance: 0 Referee: Juherman Zaiton

16 May 2021 9	Geylang International (Singapore)	2–5	(Singapore) Hougang United	Our Tampines Hub
	Amy Recha 86'; Sylvano Comvalius 90+3'; Darren Teh (yellow card) 45+2'; Yuki Ichikawa (yellow card) 87'	Report	Tomoyuki Doi 28' 90+5'; Idraki Adnan 36'; Afiq Noor 66'; Shawal Anuar 72'; Lionel Tan (yellow card) 35'	Attendance: 0 Referee: Nathan Chan

25 April 2021 10 (Rescheduled)	Young Lions FC (Singapore)	2–4	(Singapore) Geylang International	Our Tampines Hub
	Hami Syahin 14' (pen.); Syed Akmal 77'; Harhys Stewart (yellow card) 41'; Ryhan Stewart (yellow card) 41'	Report	Faizal Roslan 10'; Amy Recha 53'; Matheus Moresche 57' 90+1'; Harith Kanadi (yellow card) 61'	Attendance: 237; Referee: Abirami Naidu

23 May 2021 11	Geylang International (Singapore)	1–2	(Japan) Albirex Niigata (S)	Our Tampines Hub
	Matheus Moresche 46'; Elijah Lim Teck Yong (yellow card) 37'	Report	Kosuke Chiku 14'; Takahiro Tezuka 66'; Makoto Ito (yellow card) 87'	Attendance: 0 Referee: Abirami Naidu

25 July 2021 12 (Rescheduled)	Geylang International (Singapore)	3–1	(Singapore) Balestier Khalsa	Our Tampines Hub
	Amy Recha 41' 63' (yellow card) 62'; Matheus Moresche 54'; Harith Kanadi (yellow card) 35'	Report	Šime Žužul 11'; Kimura Riki (yellow card) 24'	Referee: Taufik Thana

1 August 2021 13 (Rescheduled)	Tanjong Pagar United (Singapore)	1–3	(Singapore) Geylang International	Jurong East Stadium
	Luiz Júnior 62' (yellow card) 78'; Shakir Hamzah (yellow card) 8'; Fathullah Rahmat (yellow card) 47'	Report	Ilhan Noor 14' 38'; Shakir Hamzah 35' (o.g.); Afiq Yunos (yellow card) 18'; Faizal Roslan (yellow card) 68'; Izzdin Shafiq (yellow card) 78'; Yuki Ichikawa (yellow card) 78'	Referee: Farhad Mohamed

25 August 2021 14 (Rescheduled)	Geylang International (Singapore)	3–1	(Singapore) Tampines Rovers	Our Tampines Hub
	Danny Kim 59'; Amy Recha 65'; Christopher van Huizen 77'; Afiq Yunos (yellow card) 53'; Barry Maguire (yellow card) 88'	Report	Boris Kopitović 45'	Referee: Juherman Zaiton

14 August 2021 15 (Rescheduled)	Geylang International (Singapore)	2–4	(Singapore) Tanjong Pagar United	Our Tampines Hub
	Anaqi Ismit 15' (o.g.); Amy Recha 18'; Harith Kanadi (yellow card) 45'; Abdil Qaiyyim Mutalib (yellow card) 90+4'	Report	Shodai Nishikawa 43'; Reo Nishiguchi 49'; Khairul Amri 78' 90'; Faritz Abdul Hameed (yellow card) 42'; Shakir Hamzah (yellow card) 56'; Blake Ricciuto (yellow card) 70'	Referee: Y Sathyakumar

20 August 2021 16 (Rescheduled)	Hougang United (Singapore)	2–1	(Singapore) Geylang International	Hougang Stadium
	Shawal Anuar 59'; Hafiz Sujad 75'	Report	Amy Recha 82'; Yuki Ichikawa (yellow card) 38'	Referee: Jansen Foo

28 August 2021 17 (Rescheduled)	Geylang International (Singapore)	2–3	(Singapore) Young Lions FC	Our Tampines Hub
	Amy Recha 7'; Matheus Moresche 56'; Wayne Chew (yellow card) 3'; Harith Kanadi (yellow card) 52'	Report	Jacob Mahler 3' (pen.); Ilhan Fandi 84' 90+4'; Rezza Rezky (yellow card) 41'; Zulqarnaen Suzliman (yellow card) 85'	Referee: Hilmi Fuad

11 September 2021 18 (Rescheduled)	Albirex Niigata (S) (Japan)	5–0	(Singapore) Geylang International	Jurong East Stadium
	Fikri Junaidi 30'; Ryosuke Nagasawa 60'; Ryoya Tanigushi 79' 88'; Kuraba Kondo 90' (yellow card) 82'; Kazuki Hashioka (yellow card) 52'	Report	Afiq Yunos (yellow card) 3'; Abdil Qaiyyim Mutalib (yellow card) 52'; Ilhan Noor (yellow card) 56'; Yuki Ichikawa (yellow card) 85'	Referee: Jansen Foo

3 October 2021 19 (Rescheduled)	Geylang International (Singapore)	3–0	(Singapore) Balestier Khalsa	Our Tampines Hub
	Amy Recha 61'; Ensar Brunčević 63' (o.g.); Matheus Moresche 73'; Ilhan Noor (yellow card) 85'; Christopher van Huizen (yellow card) 87'	Report	Ensar Brunčević (yellow card) 53'; Amer Hakeem (yellow card) 67'	Referee: Syarqawi Buhari

26 September 2021 20 (Rescheduled)	Geylang International (Singapore)	0–3	(Singapore) Lion City Sailors	Our Tampines Hub
	Matheus Moresche (yellow card) 56'	Report	Faris Ramli 32'; Song Ui-young 39' (yellow card) 52'; Hafiz Nor 87'	Referee: Jansen Foo

10 October 2021 21 (Rescheduled)	Tampines Rovers (Singapore)	1–1	(Singapore) Geylang International	Our Tampines Hub
	Taufik Suparno 73'; Iman Hakim (yellow card) 90'	Report	Amy Recha 90' (pen.); Abdil Qaiyyim Mutalib (yellow card) 62' (yellow-red card) 90'	Referee: Farhad Mohamed

Pos	Team	Pld	W	D	L	GF	GA	GD	Pts	Qualification or relegation
1	Lion City Sailors	21	14	6	1	59	21	+38	48	Qualification for AFC Champions League group stage
2	Albirex Niigata (S) (Note: The foreign club – Albirex Niigata (S) – as well as the Football Association of Singapore (FAS) under-21 team, Young Lions, are ineligible for any AFC competition spots.)	21	13	7	1	50	19	+31	46	
3	Hougang United	21	10	4	7	48	40	+8	34	Qualification for AFC Cup group stage
4	Tampines Rovers	21	7	6	8	48	51	−3	27	Qualification for AFC Cup group stage
5	Tanjong Pagar United	21	5	7	9	36	49	−13	22	
6	Geylang International	21	6	2	13	33	52	−19	20	
7	Balestier Khalsa	21	5	4	12	34	52	−18	19	
8	Young Lions	21	4	4	13	26	50	−24	16	

Updated to match(es) played on 3 April 2021. Source: Singapore Premier League
Rules for classification: 1) points; 2) goal difference; 3) number of goals scored; 4) number of wins

=== AFC Cup ===
On 11 November 2020, the AFC approved a new calendar for the competition due to the COVID-19 pandemic, where the group stage is played as centralized single round-robin tournament, and the preliminary round, play-off round, and ASEAN Zone semi-finals and final are played as a single match.

Pos	Team	Pld	W	D	L	GF	GA	GD	Pts	VIS	LAL	TER	GEY
1	(Cambodia) Visakha	0	0	0	0	0	0	0	0	—	Cancelled	—	Cancelled
2	(Timor-Leste) Lalenok United	0	0	0	0	0	0	0	0	—	—	Cancelled	—
3	(Malaysia) Terengganu	0	0	0	0	0	0	0	0	Cancelled	—	—	Cancelled
4	(Singapore) Geylang International	0	0	0	0	0	0	0	0	—	Cancelled	—	—

Source: AFC
Rules for classification: Tiebreakers

Win Draw Loss

==== Group stage ====
Matchday 1	Visakha FC (Cambodia)	cancelled	(Singapore) Geylang International

Matchday 2	Geylang International (Singapore)	cancelled	(Timor-Leste) Lalenok United

Matchday 3	Terengganu FC (Malaysia)	cancelled	(Singapore) Geylang International

=== Singapore Cup ===
Win Draw Loss
