= 2020 Albirex Niigata Singapore FC season =

Albirex Niigata (S)
2020 season
- Chairman: Daisuke Korenaga
- Head coach: Keiji Shigetomi
- Stadium: Jurong East Stadium
- Premier League: 1st

The 2020 season was Albirex Niigata Singapore FC's 17th consecutive season in the top flight of Singapore football and in the Singapore Premier League, having joined the league in 2004. The club competed only in 2020 Singapore Premier League after the Singapore Cup has been annulled.

== Squad ==
=== SPL Squad ===
As of 10 January 2020.

Squad No.	Name	Nationality	Date of birth (age)	Previous Club	Contract Start	Contract End
Goalkeepers
1	Kei Okawa	(Japan)	27 March 1998 (age 28)	(Japan) Tsukuba University	2020	2020
21	Hyrulnizam Juma'at ^{<23}	(Singapore)	14 November 1986 (age 40)	(Singapore) Warriors FC	2019	2020
26	Aizil Yazid	(Singapore)	24 December 2004 (age 21)	(Singapore) Greenridge Secondary School	2020	2020
Defenders
2	Shoma Sato	(Japan)	16 October 1999 (age 27)	(Japan) SC Sagamihara U21	2020	2020
3	Kotaro Takeda	(Japan)	26 August 1997 (age 29)	(Japan) Chukyo University	2020	2020
4	Rio Sakuma	(Japan)	14 April 1997 (age 29)	(Japan) Ryutsu Keizai University	2020	2020
5	Kazuki Hashioka (Captain)	(Japan)	20 January 1997 (age 29)	(Japan) Tokyo 23 FC	2020	2020
19	Hiromasa Ogino	(Japan)	10 March 2001 (age 25)	(Portugal) Naval 1893	2020	2020
20	Yasuhiro Hanada	(Japan)	22 May 1999 (age 27)	Japan Soccer College	2020	2020
22	Toshihiko Masuda	(Japan)	20 March 2001 (age 25)	Japan Soccer College	2020	2020
Midfielders
6	Gareth Low ^{U21}	(Singapore)	28 February 1997 (age 29)	(Singapore) Young Lions FC	2020	2020
7	Kenta Kurishima	(Japan)	19 April 1997 (age 29)	(Japan) Waseda University	2020	2020
8	Hiroyoshi Kamata	(Japan)	4 April 1997 (age 29)	(Japan) Albirex Niigata U18	2016	2020
13	Ryoya Tanigushi	(Japan)	31 August 1999 (age 27)	(Japan) Zweigen Kanazawa	2020	2020
14	Ryuya Mitsuzuka	(Japan)	17 February 1999 (age 27)	(Japan) SC Sagamihara U21	2020	2020
17	Iman Hakim ^{U21}	(Singapore)	9 March 2002 (age 24)	(Singapore) FFA U16	2020	2020
18	Mahiro Takahashi	(Japan)	26 June 2001 (age 25)	(Japan) Albirex Niigata U18	2020	2020
25	Ren Ishihara	(Japan)	31 May 2001 (age 25)	Japan Soccer College	2020	2020
27	Ong Yu En ^{U21}	(Singapore)	3 October 2003 (age 23)	(Singapore) FFA U16	2020	2020
36	Kenji Austin ^{U21}	(Singapore) (Japan)	24 February 2004 (age 22)	(Singapore) FFA U16	2020	2020
Strikers
9	Reo Nishiguchi	(Japan)	21 August 1997 (age 29)	(Japan) Chukyo University	2020	2020
10	Tomoyuki Doi	(Japan)	24 September 1997 (age 29)	(Japan) Tokoha University	2020	2020
16	Fairoz Hassan ^{<23}	(Singapore)	26 November 1988 (age 37)	(Singapore) Tiong Bahru FC (NFL)	2020	
23	Yohei Osada	(Japan)	28 November 1999 (age 26)	Japan Soccer College	2020	2020
28	Ryosuke Nagasawa	(Japan)	25 September 1998 (age 28)	(Thailand) Phuket City F.C.	2020	2020
Players who left club during season
11	Daniel Goh ^{U21}	(Singapore)	13 August 1999 (age 27)	(Singapore) Balestier Khalsa	2020	2020
15	Sharul Nizam ^{U21}	(Singapore)	2 June 1997 (age 29)	(Singapore) Young Lions FC	2020	2020
15	Noor Akid Nordin ^{<23}	(Singapore)	28 October 1996 (age 30)	(Singapore) Balestier Khalsa	2019	
24	Zamani Zamri ^{U21}	(Singapore)	31 May 2001 (age 25)	(Singapore) F-17 Academy	2019	2020

== Coaching staff ==
Position	Name
Head Coach	(Japan) Keiji Shigetomi
Asst Coach and U17 Coach	(Japan) Yuki Fujimoto
Coach	(Japan) Tomoya Ueta
U15 Coach	(Japan) Masayuki Kato
Goalkeeper Coach	(Australia) Scott Starr
Fitness Coach	(Singapore) Jaswinder Singh
Team Manager	(Singapore) Matthew Sean
Physiotherapist	(Japan)
Kitman	(Singapore) Roy Krishnan

== Transfer ==
=== Pre-season transfer ===
==== In ====
Position	Player	Transferred From	Ref
GK	(Japan) Kei Okawa	(Japan) Tsukuba University	
GK	(Singapore) Aizil Yazid	(Singapore) Greenridge Secondary School	
DF	(Japan) Rio Sakuma	(Japan) Ryutsu Keizai University	
DF	(Japan) Kazuki Hashioka	(Japan) Tokyo 23 FC (J5)	
DF	(Japan) Kotaro Takeda	(Japan) Chukyo University	
DF	(Japan) Shoma Sato	(Japan) SC Sagamihara U21 (J3)	
DF	(Japan) Hiromasa Ogino	(Portugal) Naval 1893 (P3)	
DF	(Japan) Yasuhiro Hanada	Japan Soccer College	
DF	(Japan) Toshihiko Masuda	Japan Soccer College	
MF	(Japan) Ren Ishihara	Japan Soccer College	
MF	(Japan) Mahiro Takahashi	(Japan) Albirex Niigata U18	
MF	(Japan) Kenta Kurishima	(Japan) Waseda University	
MF	(Singapore) Iman Hakim	Singapore Sports School	
MF	(Singapore) Ong Yu En	Singapore Sports School	
MF	(Singapore) Gareth Low Jun Kit	(Singapore) Young Lions FC	
MF	(Japan) Tomoyuki Doi	(Japan) Tokoha University	
MF	(Japan) Ryoya Tanigushi	(Japan) Zweigen Kanazawa (J2)	Season loan
MF	(Japan) Ryuya Mitsuzuka	(Japan) SC Sagamihara U21 (J3)	
MF	(Singapore) Daniel Goh	(Singapore) Balestier Khalsa	Free
MF	(Singapore) Noor Akid Nordin	(Singapore) Balestier Khalsa	Free
FW	(Singapore) Sharul Nizam	(Singapore) Young Lions FC	
FW	(Japan) Reo Nishiguchi	(Japan) Chukyo University	
FW	(Japan) Yohei Osada	Japan Soccer College	
FW	(Japan) Ryosuke Nagasawa	(Thailand) Phuket City F.C.	

Note 1: Shahrul Nizam left the club before the season start due to personal reason.

==== Out ====
Position	Player	Transferred To	Ref
GK	(Japan) Kengo Fukudome	(Japan) Gainare Tottori (J3)	Free
GK	(Japan) Yusuke Kawagoe	(Japan) Vertfee Takahara Nasu (J5)	Free
DF	(Singapore) Gerald Ang		
DF	(Japan) Shuhei Sasahara	DPMM FC II (Brunei League)	
DF	(Japan) Kaishu Yamazaki	(Singapore) Home United	
DF	(Japan) Naruki Takahashi	(Japan) Montedio Yamagata (J2)	Loan return
DF	(Japan) Kodai Sumikawa	(Chinese Taipei) Saturday Football Intl. FC (T2)	
DF	(Japan) Souta Sugiyama	(Japan) Okinawa SV (J5)	Free
DF	(Japan) Gamu Tasaka		
DF	(Japan) Shunsuke Fukuda		
MF	(Japan) Kyoga Nakamura	(Singapore) Tampines Rovers	Free
MF	(Singapore) Noor Akid Nordin	(Singapore) Balestier Khalsa	Loan return
MF	(Japan) Shoki Ohara	(Japan) Mito HollyHock (J2)	Loan return
MF	(Japan) Yosuke Nakagawa	(Japan) Mito HollyHock (J2)	Loan return
MF	(Singapore) Firas Irwan	(Singapore)	
MF	(Japan) Ryo Nakano		
MF	(Japan) Daichi Tanabe		
FW	(Japan) Yoshikatsu Hiraga	(Japan) Lagend Shiga FC (J5)	
FW	(Japan) Daizo Horikoshi	(Philippines) Kaya F.C.–Iloilo	Free
FW	(Japan) Makito Hatanaka		
FW	(Singapore) Daniel Martens	(Singapore) Hougang United U19	Loan return
FW	(Singapore) Sharul Nizam	(Singapore) Young Lions FC	

Note 1: Yosuke Nakagawa returned to Mito HollyHock after the loan and subsequently released. He joined Hokkaido Tokachi Sky Earth for the season.

Note 2: Naruki Takahashi moved to (Australia) Box Hill United SC who is playing in the NPL (Victoria) 2 after his contract with Montedio Yamagata ended.

==== Retained / Extension ====
Position	Player	Ref
GK	(Singapore) Hyrulnizam Juma'at	
MF	(Singapore) Zamani Zamri	
FW	(Japan) Hiroyoshi Kamata	

=== Mid-season transfer ===
==== In ====
Position	Player	Transferred From	Ref
FW	(Singapore) Fairoz Hassan	(Singapore) Tiong Bahru FC (NFL)	
MF	(Singapore) Kenji Austin	(Singapore) Active SG	

==== Out ====
Position	Player	Transferred To	Ref
MF	(Singapore) Zamani Zamri	(Singapore) Young Lions FC	NS
MF	(Singapore) Daniel Goh	(Singapore) SAFSA	NS

Note 1: Zamani Zamri was enlisted to NS in April 2020.

Note 2: Daniel Goh was enlisted to NS in June 2020.

== Friendly ==
=== Pre-season friendlies ===
Win Draw Loss

23 January 2020 1	Albirex Niigata (S) (Singapore)	2–0	Singapore Khalsa Association	Jurong East Stadium
	Ryoya Tanigushi 77'; Iman Hakim 88'

30 January 2020 2	Albirex Niigata (S) (Singapore)	cancelled	(Singapore) Balestier Khalsa	Jurong East Stadium

2 February 2020 3	Albirex Niigata (S) (Singapore)	3–0	(Singapore) SAFSA	Jurong East Stadium
	Rio Sakuma; Reo Nishiguchi

13 February 2020 4	Albirex Niigata (S) (Singapore)	1–0	(Singapore) Balestier Khalsa	Jurong East Stadium
	Ryoya Tanigushi 70'

16 February 2020 5	Albirex Niigata (S) (Singapore)	3–1	(Singapore) Young Lions FC	Jurong East Stadium
	Tomoyuki Doi; Ryoya Tanigushi

23 February 2020 6	Albirex Niigata (S) (Singapore)	6–0	(Singapore) Tanjong Pagar United	Jurong East Stadium
	Tomoyuki Doi (pen.); Ryoya Tanigushi; Ryuya Mitsuzuka (pen.)

== Team statistics ==
=== Appearances and goals ===
No.	Pos.	Player	Sleague		Singapore Cup		League Cup		Total	
No.	Pos.	Player	Apps.	Goals	Apps.	Goals	Apps.	Goals	Apps.	Goals
1	GK	(Japan) Kei Okawa	14	0	0	0	0	0	14	0
3	DF	(Japan) Kotaro Takeda	14	1	0	0	0	0	14	1
4	DF	(Japan) Rio Sakuma	13(1)	1	0	0	0	0	14	1
5	DF	(Japan) Kazuki Hashioka	14	1	0	0	0	0	14	1
6	MF	(Singapore) Gareth Low	6	0	0	0	0	0	6	0
7	MF	(Japan) Kenta Kurishima	14	1	0	0	0	0	14	1
8	MF	(Japan) Hiroyoshi Kamata	13(1)	2	0	0	0	0	14	2
9	FW	(Japan) Reo Nishiguchi	6(5)	5	0	0	0	0	11	5
10	FW	(Japan) Tomoyuki Doi	14	11	0	0	0	0	14	11
13	MF	(Japan) Ryoya Tanigushi	9(5)	4	0	0	0	0	14	4
14	MF	(Japan) Ryuya Mitsuzuka	0(10)	0	0	0	0	0	10	0
16	FW	(Singapore) Fairoz Hassan	9	1	0	0	0	0	9	1
17	MF	(Singapore) Iman Hakim	9	0	0	0	0	0	9	0
18	MF	(Japan) Mahiro Takahashi	0(9)	0	0	0	0	0	9	0
20	DF	(Japan) Yasuhiro Hanada	1(10)	1	0	0	0	0	11	1
25	MF	(Japan) Ren Ishihara	0(1)	0	0	0	0	0	1	0
27	MF	(Singapore) Ong Yu En	2(2)	1	0	0	0	0	4	1
28	FW	(Japan) Ryosuke Nagasawa	14	3	0	0	0	0	14	3
Players who have played this season but had left the club or on loan to other club
11	MF	(Singapore) Daniel Goh	2	0	0	0	0	0	2	0

== Competitions ==
=== Singapore Premier League ===
Win Draw Loss

29 February 2020 1	Albirex Niigata (S) (Singapore)	4–0	(Singapore) Geylang International	Jurong East Stadium
	Reo Nishiguchi 40'; Ryosuke Nagasawa 52'; Tomoyuki Doi 59' (pen.); Ryoya Tanigushi 74'; Gareth Low (yellow card) 38'; Rio Sakuma (yellow card) 75'	Report	Fareez Farhan (red card) 49'; Shahrin Saberin (red card) 59'; Joshua Pereira (yellow card) 28'; Iqbal Hussain (yellow card) 75'	Attendance: 2,522; Referee: Muhammad Zulfiqar; Man of the Match: (Japan) Reo Nishiguchi

7 March 2020 2	Balestier Khalsa (Singapore)	2–2	(Singapore) Albirex Niigata (S)	Bishan Stadium
	Ensar Brunčević 26'; Shuhei Hoshino 58'; Zaiful Nizam (yellow card) 89'; Ahmad Syahir (yellow card) 90+2'	Report	Ryoya Tanigushi 52'; Reo Nishiguchi 89'; Ryosuke Nagasawa (yellow card) 87'	Referee: Ahmad A'Qashah; Man of the Match: (Singapore) Zaiful Nizam

20 March 2020 3 (Rescheduled)	Tanjong Pagar United (Singapore)	2–2	(Singapore) Albirex Niigata (S)	Jurong East Stadium
	Shodai Nishikawa 17'; Yann Motta 80' (yellow card) 62'; Syahadat Masnawi (yellow card) 22'; Delwinder Singh (red card) 44'	Report	Reo Nishiguchi 58'; Tomoyuki Doi 86'; Yasuhiro Hanada (yellow card) 76'	Attendance: 0 (Note: Due to Covid 19, this match is played behind closed door.); Referee: Ahmad A'Qashah; Man of the Match: (Singapore) Fashah Iskandar

18 October 2020 4 (Rescheduled) (Note: The match is postponed following the coronavirus pandemic.)	Young Lions FC (Singapore)	0–4	(Singapore) Albirex Niigata (S)	Jurong West Stadium
	Khairin Nadim (yellow card) 44'; Shahib Masnawi (yellow card) 49'	Report	Ryoya Tanigushi 7'; Reo Nishiguchi 12'; Ryosuke Nagasawa 65'; Tomoyuki Doi 73'; Hiroyoshi Kamata (yellow card) 38'	Attendance: 0 Referee: Juherman Zaiton; Man of the Match: (Japan) Ryosuke Nagasawa

24 October 2020 5 (Rescheduled)	Albirex Niigata (S) (Singapore)	3–2	(Singapore) Lion City Sailors F.C.	Jurong East Stadium
	Tomoyuki Doi 19'; Ryosuke Nagasawa 35'; Reo Nishiguchi 94'	Report	Song Ui-young 59'; Gabriel Quak 88'; Stipe Plazibat (yellow card) 90+3'; Saifullah Akbar (yellow card) 90+4'	Attendance: 0 Referee: Muhammad Taqi; Man of the Match: (Japan) Kotaro Takeda

31 October 2020 6 (Rescheduled)	Tampines Rovers (Singapore)	2–0	(Singapore) Albirex Niigata (S)	Our Tampines Hub
	Syahrul Sazali 20' (yellow card) 87'; Jordan Webb 56' (pen.); Huzaifah Aziz (yellow card) 90+3'	Report	Fairoz Hasan (yellow card) 24'; Gareth Low (yellow card) 33'; Ryosuke Nagasawa (yellow card) 52'; Ryoya Tanigushi (yellow card) 66'	Attendance: 0 Referee: Farhan Mohd; Man of the Match: (Canada) Jordan Webb

8 November 2020 7 (Rescheduled)	Albirex Niigata (S) (Singapore)	4–0	(Singapore) Hougang United	Jurong East Stadium
	Hiroyoshi Kamata 55'; Kenta Kurishima 68'; Tomoyuki Doi 77'; Rio Sakuma 90+1'; Ryosuke Nagasawa (yellow card) 53'	Report	Hafiz Sujad (yellow card) 35'; Fabian Kwok (yellow card) 50'	Attendance: 0 Referee: Jansen Foo; Man of the Match: (Japan) Hiroyoshi Kamata

13 November 2020 8 (Rescheduled)	Geylang International (Singapore)	0–1	(Singapore) Albirex Niigata (S)	Our Tampines Hub
	Yuki Ichikawa (yellow card) 3'; Kamolidin Tashiev (yellow card) 21'; Barry Maguire (yellow card) 90+1'	Report	Tomoyuki Doi 10'; Ryoya Tanigushi (yellow card) 78'; Kotaro Takeda (yellow card) 90'	Attendance: 0 Referee: Ahmad A'Qashah; Man of the Match: (Japan) Tomoyuki Doi

17 November 2020 9(Rescheduled)	Albirex Niigata (S) (Singapore)	2–0	(Singapore) Balestier Khalsa	Jurong East Stadium
	Hiroyoshi Kamata 65'; Tomoyuki Doi 80' (yellow card) 90'; Reo Nishiguchi (yellow card) 84'	Report	Sameer Alassane (yellow card) 77'; Kristijan Krajcek (yellow card) 82'; Ahmad Syahir (yellow card) 87'; Yeo Hai Ngee (yellow card) 88'	Attendance: 0 Referee: Nathan Chan; Man of the Match: (Japan) Ryosuke Nagasawa

22 November 2020 10 (Rescheduled)	Lion City Sailors (Singapore)	2–3	(Singapore) Albirex Niigata (S)	Bishan Stadium
	Song Ui-young 22' (pen.); Tajeli Salamat 45'; Aqhari Abdullah (yellow card) 58'; Saifullah Akbar (yellow card) 78'; Shahdan Sulaiman (yellow card) 90'; Hafiz Nor (yellow card) 90+1'	Report	Tomoyuki Doi 12'; Fairoz Hasan 34'; Yasuhiro Hanada 77'; Kotaro Takeda (yellow card) 25'; Kenta Kurishima (yellow card) 73'	Attendance: 0 Referee: Farhan Mohd; Man of the Match: (Japan) Tomoyuki Doi

25 November 2020 11 (Rescheduled)	Albirex Niigata (S) (Singapore)	2–0	(Singapore) Young Lions FC	Jurong East Stadium
	Ong Yu En 4' (yellow card) 20'; Kazuki Hashioka 67'	Report	Bill Mamadou (yellow card) 57'; Sahffee Jubpre (yellow card) 59'	Attendance: 0 Referee: Juherman Zaiton; Man of the Match: (Singapore) Nurshafiq Zaini

29 November 2020 12 (Rescheduled)	Albirex Niigata (S) (Singapore)	1–4	(Singapore) Tampines Rovers	Jurong East Stadium
	Tomoyuki Doi 37'; Kenta Kurishima (yellow card) 82'	Report	Boris Kopitović 49' 62'; Amirul Adli 57'; Taufik Suparno 88'; Andrew Aw (yellow card) 24'; Zehrudin Mehmedović (yellow card) 64'	Attendance: 0 Referee: Jansen Foo; Man of the Match: (Japan) Kyoga Nakamura

2 December 2020 13 (Rescheduled)	Albirex Niigata (S) (Singapore)	3–0	(Singapore) Tanjong Pagar United	Jurong East Stadium
	Tomoyuki Doi 48' (pen.) 90+3'; Kotaro Takeda 89'; Ryuya Mitsuzuka (yellow card) 74'	Report		Attendance: 0 Referee: Muhammad Zulfiqar; Man of the Match: (Japan) Tomoyuki Doi

5 December 2020 14 (Rescheduled)	Hougang United (Singapore)	0–1	(Singapore) Albirex Niigata (S)	Hougang Stadium
	Nikesh Singh (yellow card) 32'	Report	Ryoya Tanigushi 53'	Attendance: 0 Referee: Juherman Zaiton; Man of the Match: (Japan) Ryoya Tanigushi

Pos	Team	Pld	W	D	L	GF	GA	GD	Pts	Qualification or relegation
1	Albirex Niigata (S) (Note: The foreign club – Albirex Niigata (S) – as well as the Football Association of Singapore (FAS) under-21 team, Young Lions, are ineligible for any AFC competition spots.) (C)	14	10	2	2	32	14	+18	32	
2	Tampines Rovers	14	8	5	1	27	11	+16	29	Qualification for AFC Champions League group stage
3	Lion City Sailors	14	8	3	3	44	18	+26	27	Qualification for AFC Cup group stage
4	Geylang International	14	6	2	6	18	22	−4	20	Qualification for AFC Cup group stage
5	Balestier Khalsa	14	5	4	5	22	28	−6	19	

Source: Singapore Premier League
Rules for classification: 1) points; 2) goal difference; 3) number of goals scored; 4) number of wins
(C) Champions

=== Singapore Cup ===
Due to COVID-19 pandemic, 2020 Singapore Cup has been annulled in order to facilitate the League's completion.
