= Fikri Junaidi =

Singaporean footballer

Personal information
- Full name: Muhammad Fikri bin Junaidi
- Date of birth: 2 April 2000 (age 26)
- Place of birth: Singapore
- Height: 1.78 m (5 ft 10 in)
- Position: Forward

Senior career*
Years	Team	Apps	(Gls)
2019	Geylang International FC	4	(0)
2020	Young Lions FC	3	(0)
2021–2022	Albirex Niigata (S)	3	(1)
- * Club domestic league appearances and goals as of 17:58, 02 September 2024 (UTC)

Muhammad Fikri bin Junaidi (born 2 April 2000 in Singapore) is a Singaporean footballer who plays as a forward. He is currently a free agent.

== Career ==
Junaidi started his senior career with Geylang International. In 2020, he signed for Young Lions in the Singapore Premier League, where he has made three league appearances and scored zero goals.

In the following season, Junaidi joined the-then SPL reigning champions Albirex Niigata (S), featuring in 3 games. He performed credibly, even scoring his first-ever professional goal against Tampines Rovers in a 2-2 draw. On the final day of the 2021 SPL season, Junaidi provided a brilliant cross for teammate Kiyoshiro Tsuboi to score his 4th goal of the game against Tanjong Pagar United, but the game ended 4-4, with Albirex falling short of reclaiming their SPL title.

Junaidi was an unused substitute in his final Singapore Premier League game for Albirex Niigata (S) in March 2022, against the then reigning champions, Lion City Sailors

In August 2022, Junaidi was reportedly involved in a riot near Orchard Towers. He was allegedly a secret society member. In August 2024, he was sentenced to two years and a month in jail and a fine of $800 on Sept 30 after he pleaded guilty to one count each of rioting and being a member of an unlawful society.

== Career statistics ==
=== Club ===
As of 1 Nov 2020.

Club	Season	League			FA Cup		Asia		Other		Total	
Club	Season	Division	Apps	Goals	Apps	Goals	Apps	Goals	Apps	Goals	Apps	Goals
Geylang International	2019	Singapore Premier League	4	0	0	0	0	0	0	0	4	0
Geylang International	Total		4	0	0	0	0	0	0	0	4	0
Young Lions	2020	Singapore Premier League	3	0	0	0	0	0	0	0	3	0
Young Lions	Total		3	0	0	0	0	0	0	0	3	0
Albirex Niigata (S)	2021	Singapore Premier League	3	1	0	0	0	0	0	0	3	1
Albirex Niigata (S)	2022	Singapore Premier League	0	0	0	0	0	0	0	0	0	0
Albirex Niigata (S)	Total		3	1	0	0	0	0	0	0	3	1
Career total			10	1	0	0	0	0	0	0	10	1
