= Kiyoshiro Tsuboi =

Japanese footballer

Personal information
- Date of birth: 1 February 2000 (age 26)
- Place of birth: Nanto, Toyama, Japan
- Height: 1.78 m (5 ft 10 in)
- Position: Forward

Team information
- Current team: Tokushima Vortis

Youth career
- Inami SSS
- Kataller Toyama
- 2015–2017: Toyama Daiichi High School

Senior career*
Years	Team	Apps	(Gls)
2018–2019	Tokushima Vortis	88	(9)
2019	→ Blaublitz Akita (loan)	7	(0)
2020	→ Kochi United (loan)	11	(1)
2021	→ Albirex Niigata (S) (loan)	13	(15)
- * Club domestic league appearances and goals as of 1 January 2026

Kiyoshiro Tsuboi (坪井 清志郎, Tsuboi Kiyoshiro; born 1 February 2000) is a Japanese footballer currently playing as a forward for Tokushima Vortis.

== Club career ==
=== Albriex Niigata (Singapore) ===
Tsuboi signed on loan from J2 League team Tokushima Vortis for the 2021 Singapore Premier League season and has set himself a target of reaching double figures for goals scored. He conjured a dream debut as he netted a brace and led his team to a 3-1 win over Hougang United on the opening day of the 2021 SPL season. He continued his goal scoring start to the season by netting a goal and laying off two assists for his teammates Ryoya Taniguchi and Makoto Ito, helping his team to a 3-0 win over Young Lions in match day 2 of the 2021 season, lifting the White Swans to the top of the table and the only side left with a 100% record.

== Career statistics ==
=== Club ===
As of 2 Sept 2023.

Club	Season	League			National Cup		League Cup		Other		Total	
Club	Season	Division	Apps	Goals	Apps	Goals	Apps	Goals	Apps	Goals	Apps	Goals
Tokushima Vortis	2019	J2 League	0	0	0	0	0	0	0	0	0	0
Tokushima Vortis	2020	J2 League	0	0	0	0	0	0	0	0	0	0
Tokushima Vortis	2021	J1 League	0	0	0	0	0	0	0	0	0	0
Tokushima Vortis	2022	J2 League	18	1	5	0	0	0	0	0	23	1
Tokushima Vortis	2023	J2 League	24	2	0	0	0	0	0	0	24	2
Tokushima Vortis	Total		42	3	5	0	0	0	0	0	47	3
Blaublitz Akita (loan)	2019	J3 League	7	0	1 (Note: Appearances in the Emperor's Cup)	0	–		0	0	8	0
Kochi United (loan)	2020	JFL	11	1	1	0	–		0	0	12	1
Albirex Niigata (S) (loan)	2021	SPL	13	15	0	0	–		0	0	13	15
Career total			32	16	2	0	0	0	0	0	34	16
