= Kosuke Chiku =

Japanese footballer

Personal information
- Date of birth: 3 February 1999 (age 27)
- Place of birth: Saitama, Japan
- Height: 1.78 m (5 ft 10 in)
- Position: Midfielder

Team information
- Current team: Gainare Tottori
- Number: 15

Youth career
- Urawa Mimuro SSS
- –2013: Urawa Red Diamonds
- 2014–2016: Kokugakuin Univ. Kugayama High School

College career
Years	Team	Apps	(Gls)
2017–2020	University of Tsukuba		

Senior career*
Years	Team	Apps	(Gls)
2021	Albirex Niigata (S)	21	(1)
2022–2023	Gainare Tottori	16	(0)
- * Club domestic league appearances and goals as of 1 January 2024

Kosuke Chiku (知久 航介, Chiku Kosuke; born 3 February 1999) is a Japanese footballer who plays as a midfielder for Gainare Tottori.

== Club career ==
Having previously captained the University of Tsukuba football team, Chiku joined Singapore Premier League side Albirex Niigata Singapore ahead of the 2021 season. After one season in Singapore, Chiku returned to Japan to sign for J3 League side Gainare Tottori ahead of the 2022 season.

== Career statistics ==
=== Club ===
As of 14 March 2022.

Club	Season	League			Cup		Other		Total	
Club	Season	Division	Apps	Goals	Apps	Goals	Apps	Goals	Apps	Goals
Albirex Niigata (S)	2021	SPL	21	1	0	0	0	0	21	1
Gainare Tottori	2022	J3 League	10	0	0	0	0	0	10	0
Gainare Tottori	2023	J3 League	6	0	0	0	0	0	6	0
Blancdieu Hirosaki FC	2024	Tohoku Soccer League	0	0	0	0	0	0	0	0
Career total			34	1	0	0	0	0	32	1
