= Mahiro Takahashi =

Japanese footballer (born 2001)

Personal information
- Date of birth: 26 June 2001 (age 25)
- Place of birth: Yamagata, Japan
- Height: 1.73 m (5 ft 8 in)
- Position: Midfielder

Youth career
- Takahata Shuyu SC
- FC Yonezawa
- 2017–2019: Albirex Niigata

Senior career*
Years	Team	Apps	(Gls)
2020–2022	Albirex Niigata (S)	30	(0)
2023–2024	Boeung Ket	28	(1)
2024	Kirivong Sok Sen Chey	11	(2)
- * Club domestic league appearances and goals as of 17:31, 24 November 2024 (UTC)

Mahiro Takahashi (高橋 真広, Takahashi Mahiro; born 26 June 2001) is a Japanese footballer who plays as a central midfielder.

== Club ==
=== Albirex Niigata (S) ===
In 2020, Takahashi joins Singapore Premier League club, Albirex Niigata (S). He made 9 appearances as a substitute for the season. His contract was extended for the 2021 season. He made ten appearances as a substitute for the season. It was announced on 21 November 2021 that his contract was extended for the 2022 season.

In 2023, he announced his early retirement from football. He won 2 League titles with the club

=== Boueng Ket ===
On 27 May 2023, he came out of retirement to join Cambodian Premier League club, Boeung Ket where he would play under Singaporean head coach, Clement Teo.

== Honours ==
=== Albirex Niigata (S) ===
• Singapore Premier League: 2020, 2022

== Career statistics ==
=== Club ===
As of 2 January 2022.

Club	Season	League			Cup		Other		Total	
Club	Season	Division	Apps	Goals	Apps	Goals	Apps	Goals	Apps	Goals
Albirex Niigata (S)	2020	SPL	9	0	0	0	0	0	9	0
Albirex Niigata (S)	2021	SPL	10	0	0	0	0	0	10	0
Albirex Niigata (S)	2022	SPL	11	0	1	0	0	0	12	0
Albirex Niigata (S)	Total		30	0	1	0	0	0	31	0
Boeung Ket Angkor	2023–24	Cambodian Premier League	28	1	0	0	0	0	28	1
Boeung Ket Angkor	Total		28	1	0	0	0	0	28	1
Kirivong Sok Sen Chey	2024–25	Cambodian Premier League	0	0	0	0	0	0	0	0
Kirivong Sok Sen Chey	Total		0	0	0	0	0	0	0	0
Career total			58	1	1	0	0	0	59	1
