= Shuya Yamashita =

Japanese footballer

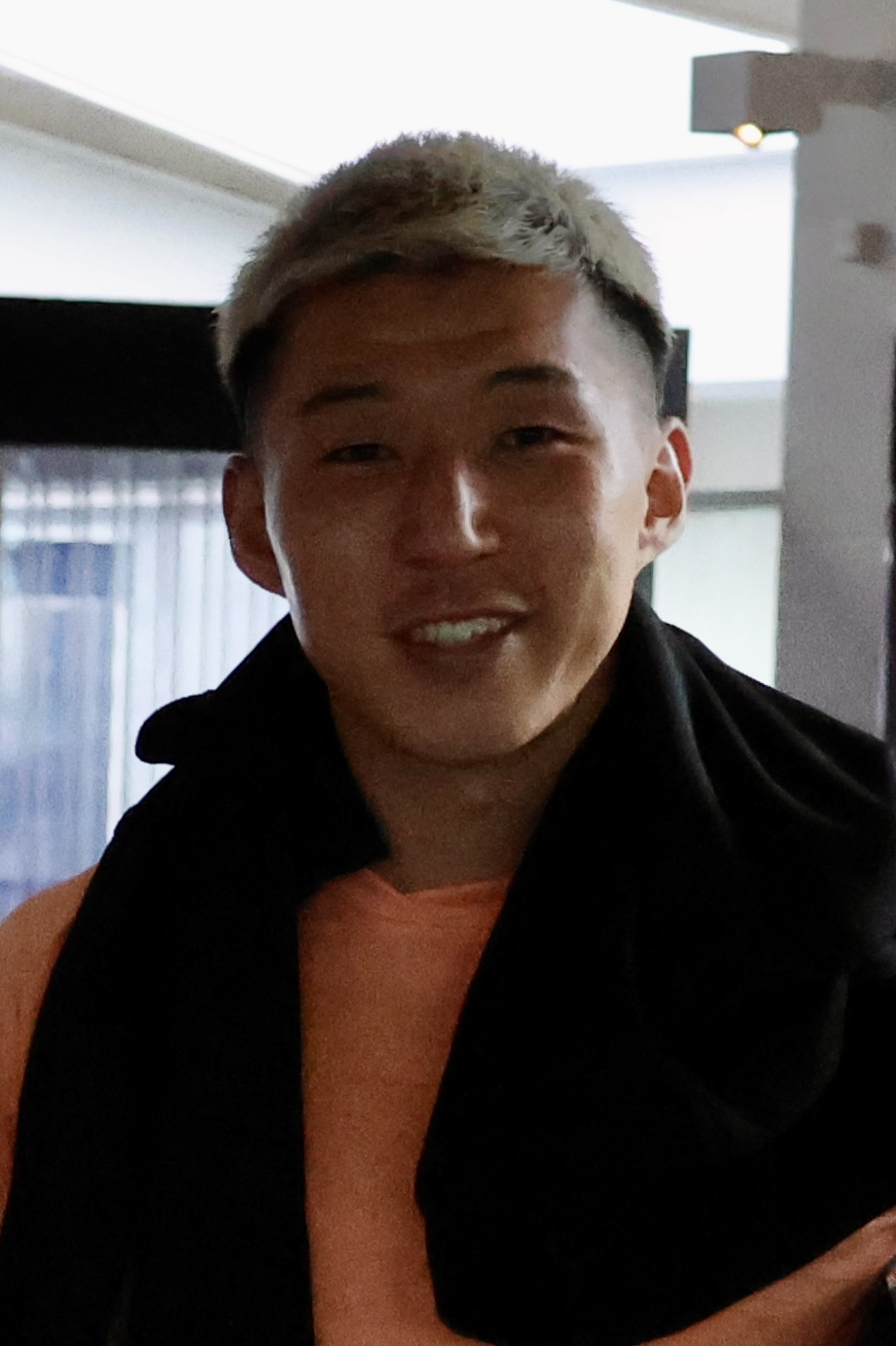
- Yamashita with Tampines Rovers in 2024

Personal information
- Date of birth: 16 April 1998 (age 28)
- Place of birth: Ishikawa, Japan
- Height: 1.80 m (5 ft 11 in)
- Position: Defender

Team information
- Current team: Young Lions

Youth career
- Daiichi Tsubasa SS
- Geminis Kanazawa
- 2014–2016: Sakuyo High School

College career
| Years | Team | Apps | (Gls) |
| 2017–2020 | Tokoha University | | |

Senior career*
| Years | Team | Apps | (Gls) |
| 2021 | Albirex Niigata (S) | 21 | (3) |
| 2022–2026 | Tampines Rovers | 62 | (4) |
| 2026– | Young Lions | 0 | (0) |
- * Club domestic league appearances and goals as of 3 August 2024

Shuya Yamashita (山下 柊哉, Yamashita Shuya; born 16 April 1998) is a Japanese professional footballer who currently plays mainly as a centre-back for Singapore Premier League club Young Lions.

== Club career ==
=== Tokoha University ===
He started his youth career with Tokoha University.

=== Albriex Niigata (S) ===
On 17 January 2021, Yamashita moved to Singapore to joined Albirex Niigata (S). On 7 April 2021, he scored his first goal for the club against Lion City Sailors in a 2–2 draw. Yamashita ended the season being included in the 2021 Singapore Premier League 'Team of the Year'.

=== Tampines Rovers ===
After a year in Singapore, Yamashita signed for local club, Tampines Rovers on 4 January 2022 On 20 April 2022, he scored his first goal for the club against Young Lions. Yamashita extended his contract for another season at the end of 2022.

He is known for his on-field communication and demanding nature, and is often seen shouting instructions and holding his fellow defenders accountable. This straightforward approach, particularly with his defensive partner thruout his career with the Stags, has been noted as a sign of his commitment to winning. As at Aug-2025, he is in his 4th season with the Stags, and 5th in Singapore football, thus making him eligible for naturalization for Singapore.

He won his 1st title in Singapore football when Tampines Rovers beat Lion City Sailors in the 2025 Singapore Community Shield.

== Career statistics ==
=== Club ===
As of 20 Sept 2026.

| Club | Season | League | | | Singapore Cup | | AFC/AFF | | Total | |
| Club | Season | Division | Apps | Goals | Apps | Goals | Apps | Goals | Apps | Goals |
|---|---|---|---|---|---|---|---|---|---|---|
| Albirex Niigata (S) | 2021 | Singapore Premier League | 21 | 3 | 0 | 0 | 0 | 0 | 21 | 3 |
| Albirex Niigata (S) | Total | | 21 | 3 | 0 | 0 | 0 | 0 | 21 | 3 |
| Tampines Rovers | 2022 | Singapore Premier League | 27 | 2 | 6 | 0 | 2 | 0 | 35 | 2 |
| Tampines Rovers | 2023 | Singapore Premier League | 24 | 1 | 7 | 1 | 1 | 0 | 32 | 2 |
| Tampines Rovers | 2024–25 | Singapore Premier League | 30 | 1 | 7 | 1 | 6 | 1 | 43 | 4 |
| Tampines Rovers | 2025–26 | Singapore Premier League | 20 | 1 | 3 | 0 | 16 (Note: 1 appearance in Community Shield, 10 in AFC2 Cup, 5 in Shopee Cup) | 0 | 39 | 1 |
| Tampines Rovers | Total | | 101 | 5 | 24 | 2 | 25 | 1 | 149 | 8 |
| Young Lions | 2026–27 | Singapore Premier League | 2 | 0 | 0 | 0 | 0 | 0 | 2 | 0 |
| Young Lions | Total | | 2 | 0 | 0 | 0 | 0 | 0 | 2 | 0 |
| Career total | | | 124 | 8 | 23 | 2 | 25 | 1 | 172 | 11 |

== Honours ==
=== Club ===
==== Tampines Rovers ====
- Singapore Community Shield : 2025

=== Individual ===
- Singapore Premier League Team of the Year: 2021
