= Song Ui-young =

Singaporean footballer (born 1993)

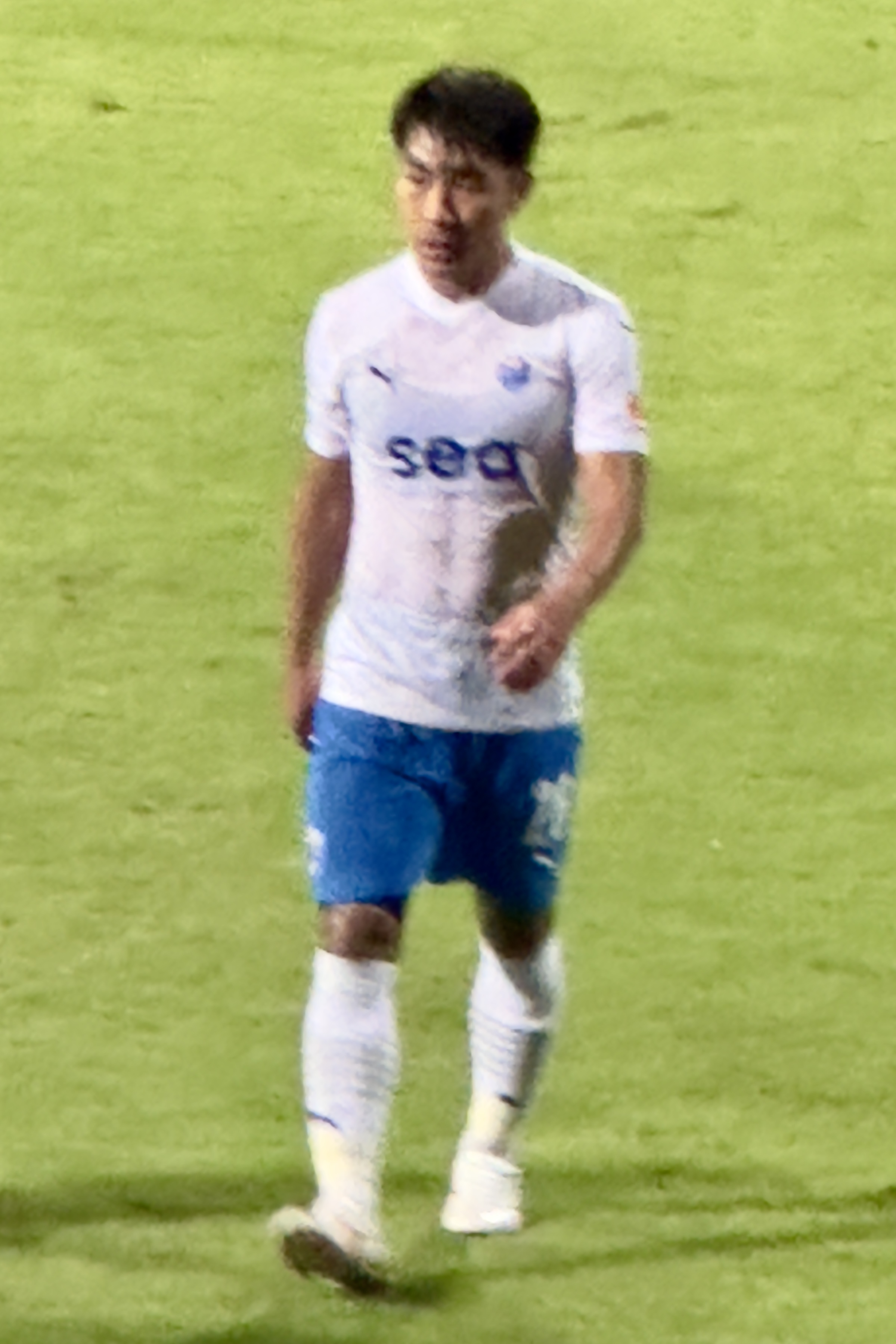
- Song with Lion City Sailors in 2024

Personal information
- Date of birth: 8 November 1993 (age 33)
- Place of birth: Incheon, South Korea
- Height: 1.71 m (5 ft 7 in)
- Position: Midfielder

Team information
- Current team: Lion City Sailors
- Number: 15

Youth career
- Cheong Wang Middle School
- Yeouido High School

Senior career*
Years	Team	Apps	(Gls)
2011–2023	Lion City Sailors (Note: Home United changed its name to Lion City Sailors in 2020)	163	(55)
2023	Nongbua Pitchaya	8	(1)
2023–2024	Persebaya Surabaya	17	(1)
2024–	Lion City Sailors	40	(8)

International career^{‡}
2021–	Singapore	45	(10)
- * Club domestic league appearances and goals as of 1 November 2026 ‡ National team caps and goals as of 13 November 2026

- Korean name
- Hangul: 송의영
- Hanja: 宋義英
- RR: Song Uiyeong
- MR: Song Ŭiyŏng

Song Ui-young (Korean: 송의영; born 8 November 1993) is a professional footballer who plays as a midfielder for Singapore Premier League club Lion City Sailors. Born in South Korea, he plays for the Singapore national team.

As a midfielder who has played in the Singapore Premier League, he is noted for his pace, dribbling ability, work rate, and technical skills. He moved to Singapore in 2011 to join Home United, now known as Lion City Sailors. Song has been regarded as one of the leading midfielders in the league and in Southeast Asia.

== Early life ==
Song was born in Incheon, South Korea and spent most of his childhood between school and football. Song was known as a quiet child during his schooling days, but stood out for his footballing skills and passion for the sport. He was scouted in his final year of elementary school to join Cheong Wang Middle School, a school renowned for its footballing programme. Song also moved to the dormitory as the school premises were situated in the Gyeonggi-do province, away from Incheon where he lived.

== Club career ==
=== Youth ===
At the age of 13, Song began training with the school team of Cheong Wang Middle School. In the final year of middle school, Song was made the team captain and his head coach also put in a recommendation during his graduation for him. to attend his high school education at Yeouido High School, which was known for its affiliations with K League Classic club Suwon Samsung Bluewings.

=== Home United ===
Having excelled at youth level for his academy, by the recommendation of his coach from Yeouido High School, Song left South Korea at the age of 17 to pursue footballing opportunities in Singapore. Song's move to Singapore was eased by the presence of Home United's coach, Lee Lim-saeng in which Song said that his academy’s coach knew him. Lee used to work as an assistant coach in Suwon Samsung and the academy was under Suwon Samsung so both coaches knew each other. He also worked under assistant coach Baek Jong-seok, whom he shared an apartment with.

Song subsequently joined Home United's youth team, which participates in the Prime League, before being promoted to join the first team which competed in the S.League. On 12 July 2012, Song made his debut appearance for the Protectors in the uniformed derby against Warriors. He played a total of 46 minutes in his first competitive match for the club, which subsequently ended in a 0–3 loss for his side.

Former Home United coach Philippe Aw who managed the Singapore Selection side for the 2016 Sultan of Selangor Cup, selected Song in the 18-man squad for the cup tie that took place at the Shah Alam Stadium on 7 May 2016. He came on as a substitute in the 56th minute, and played the remainder of the match which eventually ended 1–1 (3–4 on penalties) in a win for the Singapore Selection team.

Song often spearheaded the attacking players in the false nine position. Alongside Shahril Ishak, he enjoyed a prolific start to the 2018 Singapore Premier League campaign before encountering an injury that ruled him out for the latter half of the season. Song also played a pivotal role in helping the club to a second-place finish, scoring a total of 20 goals over the entire season, securing Home United with a play-off slot for the AFC Champions League as well as its highest ever AFC Cup finish in the quarter-finals.

On 1 November 2018, it was reported that Song had rejected interest from Indonesian giants Persija Jakarta. Despite being offered a deal worth US$20,000 per month from the Indonesian club, Song chose to remain with Home United, stating his hopes of representing Singapore internationally in the future. He also signed a two-year contract extension with the Singapore-based club.

=== Lion City Sailors ===
On 14 February 2020, Home United was purchased, privatised and officially renamed as Lion City Sailors by Singaporean billionaire, Forrest Li. Song remained with the rebranded side, representing the club for the 2020 Singapore Premier League season.

During the 2021 season, Song was quick to express his delight at the influx of fresh talent, which he explained helped boost the quality and intensity of training sessions. However, the arrival of Lopes also meant he had to give up his number 10 shirt. Under new manager Kim Do-hoon, Song was part of the Lion City Sailors side that won the 2021 Singapore Premier League which qualified them for next season AFC Champions League group stage. He ended the season scoring 7 goals in 15 appearances.

In Song's first game of the 2022 season, he helped his side to win the 2022 Singapore Community Shield. He went on to score six goals and provided five assists in 31 appearances for the club. During the 2022 AFC Champions League group stage matches, Song scored a header from Maxime Lestienne's cross which resulted the Sailors to a 3–0 victory against K League 1 club Daegu FC. Against the Chinese club, Shandong Taishan, he scored a goal and provided a assist and was named 'Man of the Match'. In the reverse fixture against Daegu, Song scored a goal again but the Sailors eventually lost the match. In May, it was reported that Daegu and Suwon FC is interested in signing Song and had made an offer.

Song has scored 78 goals and provided 23 assists in 226 appearances across 12 seasons, leaving the Sailors as their all-time top goalscorer with 32 goals in all competitions.

=== Nongbua Pitchaya ===
On 15 January 2023, it was announced that Song had left Lion City Sailors to move out of his “comfort zone” to pursue new challenges with Thai League 1 side Nongbua Pitchaya. On 21 January 2023, Song scored his first goal in his debut game for the club against Bangkok United in a 3–1 loss.

=== Persebaya Surabaya ===
On 2 June 2023, Song signed on with Indonesia's Liga 1 club Persebaya Surabaya. On 18 August 2023, Song scored a rocket shot from outside the box scoring the only goal in the game against Liga 1 champions, PSM Makassar. His goal was voted as the 'Best Goal of the Week' for game week 9.

=== Return to Lion City Sailors ===
After spending nearly a year playing his trade in Thailand and Indonesia, on 7 March 2024, Song returned to his former club Lion City Sailors, on a two-year contract in preparation for the 2024–25 Singapore Premier League season and the newly formed 2024–25 AFC Champions League Two campaign. He will don Number 15 which was his first number that he wore since he moved to Singapore back in 2011. On his official return to the club on 4 May 2024, Song helped his club to win the 2024 Singapore Community Shield in a 2–0 win against Albirex Niigata (S). On 23 June, Song scored his 80th goal in his 230th appearance for the club in a 7–1 thrashing league win over Albirex Niigata (S). On 5 December, Song scored a hat-trick where he also assisted Lennart Thy goal during the club's 5–2 victory against Thailand club Port helping Lion City Sailors to finish as Group F winners and advancing to the round of 16 in the AFC Champions League Two where scored 5 goals in six appearances in the AFC Champions League Two group stage. Despite Maxime Lestienne's equaliser in the 91st minute of the 2025 AFC Champions League Two final against Sharjah, the Sailors finished as a runner-up after conceding in the 97th minute to finish the game in a 1–2 defeat.

== International career ==
After receiving Singaporean citizenship, Song was called up to the Singapore national team on 27 August 2021.

On 11 November 2021, Song made his international debut in a friendly match against Kyrgyzstan. On 5 December 2021, Song made his competitive debut at the 2020 AFF Championship with a 3–0 victory against Myanmar. Song scored his first goal for Singapore in the second leg of the 2020 AFF Championship semi-final match against Indonesia.

Song scored the lead against Kyrgyzstan in the first game of the 2023 AFC Asian Cup third-round qualifiers before turning from hero to zero conceding the next two goals in three minutes sent Singapore to a narrow defeat. His third goal came in a 6–2 win over Myanmar in the final match of their qualifiers.

Song was called up for the 2022 AFF Championship. On 12 September 2023, Song scored a goal against Chinese Taipei in his return to the national team. Singapore won that game 3–1.

On 15 October 2025, Song scored a brace in the 2027 AFC Asian Cup qualification match against India in Margao helping Singapore to a 2–1 win.

== Style of play ==
Initially deployed as a defensive midfielder by former Home United head coach Lee Lim-saeng, Song was placed in more offensive roles under Aidil Sharin Sahak, playing in a variety of positions as a box-to-box or attacking midfielder, winger, second striker and even as a poacher.

== Personal life ==
During an interview in 2016, Song shared his eagerness for representing Singapore internationally, which included having to naturalise as a Singaporean citizen in the process and renouncing his South Korean citizenship, as both Singapore and South Korea do not permit dual citizenship. Song had also been applying to be a Singaporean citizen on his own merit, independent of the possibility of the Football Association of Singapore reviving the Foreign Sports Talent Scheme which was established in the 2000s. Furthermore, he had met FIFA eligibility rules for foreign players planning to represent other national teams, as he has never represented South Korea internationally.

Song moved to Singapore in 2011. In 2020, after three unsuccessful attempts, Song successfully became a permanent resident (PR). A year later on 20 August 2021, Song formally became a Singaporean citizen, therefore making him eligible to represent Singapore. Song had relinquished his South Korean citizenship in the process.

In May 2024, Song married his long-time girlfriend in South Korea, where she resides.

== Career statistics ==
=== Club ===
As of match played 30 June 2026

Appearances and goals by club, season and competition
Club	Season	League			National cup		League cup		Continental		Other		Total	
Club	Season	Division	Apps	Goals	Apps	Goals	Apps	Goals	Apps	Goals	Apps	Goals	Apps	Goals
Lion City Sailors	2012	S.League	6	0	1	0	0	0	0	0	0	0	7	0
Lion City Sailors	2013	S.League	22	2	4	1	3	1	0	0	0	0	29	4
Lion City Sailors	2014	S.League	6	0	1	0	0	0	0	0	0	0	7	0
Lion City Sailors	2015	S.League	20	1	1	0	2	0	0	0	0	0	23	1
Lion City Sailors	2016	S.League	19	5	1	0	4	1	0	0	0	0	24	6
Lion City Sailors	2017	S.League	13	2	5	0	0	0	7 (Note: Appearance(s) in AFC Champions League Two)	3	0	0	25	5
Lion City Sailors	2018	Singapore Premier League	13	10	3	1	0	0	11	9	0	0	27	20
Lion City Sailors	2019	Singapore Premier League	18	6	3	2	0	0	4 (Note: One appearance and one goal in AFC Champions League qualifying play-offs, three appearances and two goals in AFC Champions League Two)	3	0	0	25	11
Lion City Sailors	Total		117	26	19	4	9	2	22	15	0	0	167	47
Lion City Sailors	2020	Singapore Premier League	12	9	0	0	0	0	0	0	0	0	12	9
Lion City Sailors	2021	Singapore Premier League	15	7	0	0	0	0	0	0	0	0	15	7
Lion City Sailors	2022	Singapore Premier League	24	13	0	0	0	0	6 (Note: Appearance(s) in AFC Champions League Elite)	3	1 (Note: Appearance(s) in Singapore Community Shield)	0	31	16
Lion City Sailors	Total		51	29	0	0	0	0	6	3	1	0	58	32
Nongbua Pitchaya	2022–23	Thai League 1	8	1	0	0	0	0	0	0	0	0	8	1
Nongbua Pitchaya	Total		8	1	0	0	0	0	0	0	0	0	8	1
Persebaya Surabaya	2023–24	Liga 1	17	1	0	0	0	0	0	0	0	0	17	1
Persebaya Surabaya	Total		17	1	0	0	0	0	0	0	0	0	17	1
Lion City Sailors	2024–25	Singapore Premier League	25	6	7	1	0	0	10	5	6 (Note: Five appearances in ASEAN Club Championship, one appearance in Singapore Community Shield)	0	48	12
Lion City Sailors	2025–26	Singapore Premier League	11	2	2	0	0	0	6	0	3 (Note: 2 appearances in ASEAN Club Championship, one appearance in Singapore Community Shield)	0	22	2
Lion City Sailors	2026–27	Singapore Premier League	0	0	0	0	0	0	0	0	0	0	0	0
Lion City Sailors	Total		36	8	9	1	0	0	16	0	9	0	70	9
Career total			219	63	26	5	9	2	44	23	11	0	319	95

=== International ===
As of match played 13 November 2026

Appearances and goals by national team and year
National team	Year	Apps	Goals
Singapore	2021	6	1
Singapore	2022	9	2
Singapore	2023	7	1
Singapore	2024	3	0
Singapore	2025	7	3
Singapore	2026	11	3
Total		45	10

Scores and results list Singapore's goal tally first, score column indicates score after each Song goal.

No.	Date	Venue	Opponent	Score	Result	Competition
1.	25 December 2021	National Stadium, Kallang, Singapore	Indonesia	1–1	2–4	2020 AFF Championship
2.	8 June 2022	Dolen Omurzakov Stadium, Bishkek, Kyrgyzstan	Kyrgyzstan	1–0	1–2	2023 AFC Asian Cup qualification
3.	14 June 2022	Dolen Omurzakov Stadium, Bishkek, Kyrgyzstan	Myanmar	2–0	6–2	2023 AFC Asian Cup qualification
4.	12 September 2023	Bishan Stadium, Bishan, Singapore	Chinese Taipei	1–1	3–1	Friendly
5.	10 June 2025	National Stadium, Dhaka, Bangladesh	Bangladesh	1–0	2–1	2027 AFC Asian Cup qualification
6.	14 October 2025	Pandit Jawaharlal Nehru Stadium, Margao, India	India	1–1	2–1	2027 AFC Asian Cup qualification
7.	14 October 2025	Pandit Jawaharlal Nehru Stadium, Margao, India	India	2–1	2–1	2027 AFC Asian Cup qualification
8.	31 May 2026	Jalan Besar Stadium, Kallang, Singapore	Mongolia	2–0	4–0	Friendly
9.	27 July 2026	Jalan Besar Stadium, Kallang, Singapore	Timor-Leste	2–0	2–0	2026 ASEAN Championship
10.	13 November 2026	National Stadium, Kallang, Singapore	Paraguay	1–1	1–4	Friendly

== Honours ==
=== Club ===
Lion City Sailors

- AFC Champions League Two runner-up: 2024–25
- Singapore Premier League: 2021, 2024–25; runner-up: 2013, 2018,
- Singapore Cup: 2013, 2024–25, 2025–26; runner-up: 2014, 2015
- Singapore Community Shield: 2019, 2022, 2024; runner-up: 2025

=== Individual ===
- Singapore Premier League Team of the Year: 2018, 2020

== See also ==
- List of Singapore international footballers born outside Singapore
