= Idraki Adnan =

Singaporean footballer

Personal information
- Full name: Idraki bin Mohd Adnan
- Date of birth: 13 March 1999 (age 27)
- Place of birth: Singapore
- Position: Winger

Team information
- Current team: Albirex Niigata (S)
- Number: 13

Youth career
- 2017: Home United U16
- 2018: Hougang United U19

Senior career*
Years	Team	Apps	(Gls)
2020	Young Lions	7	(0)
2021–2023	Hougang United	14	(4)
2024–	Albirex Niigata (S)	0	(0)

International career^{‡}
2017–2018	Singapore U19	9	(1)
- * Club domestic league appearances and goals as of 5 Feb 2021 ‡ National team caps and goals as of 5 Feb 2021

Idraki bin Mohd Adnan (born 13 March 1999), more commonly known as just Idraki, is a Singaporean professional footballer who plays mainly as a winger for Singapore Premier League club Albirex Niigata (S)

== Club career ==
=== Hougang United ===
In 2021, Idraki returned to Hougang United after playing for Young Lions in 2020.

=== Albirex Niigata Singapore ===
On 5 January 2024, Idraki joined Albirex Niigata (S) on a permanent deal.

== Career statistics ==
=== Club ===
As of 10 Oct 2021.

Club	Season	League			Cup		Continental		Other		Total	
Club	Season	Division	Apps	Goals	Apps	Goals	Apps	Goals	Apps	Goals	Apps	Goals
Young Lions	2020	Singapore Premier League	7	0	0	0	0	0	0	0	7	0
Young Lions	Total		7	0	0	0	0	0	0	0	7	0
Hougang United	2021	Singapore Premier League	12	4	0	0	0	0	0	0	12	4
Hougang United	2022	Singapore Premier League	0	0	0	0	0	0	0	0	0	0
Hougang United	2023	Singapore Premier League	0	0	0	0	0	0	0	0	0	0
Hougang United	Total		12	4	0	0	0	0	0	0	12	4
Career total			19	4	0	0	0	0	0	0	19	4
