= Jorge Fellipe =

Brazilian footballer

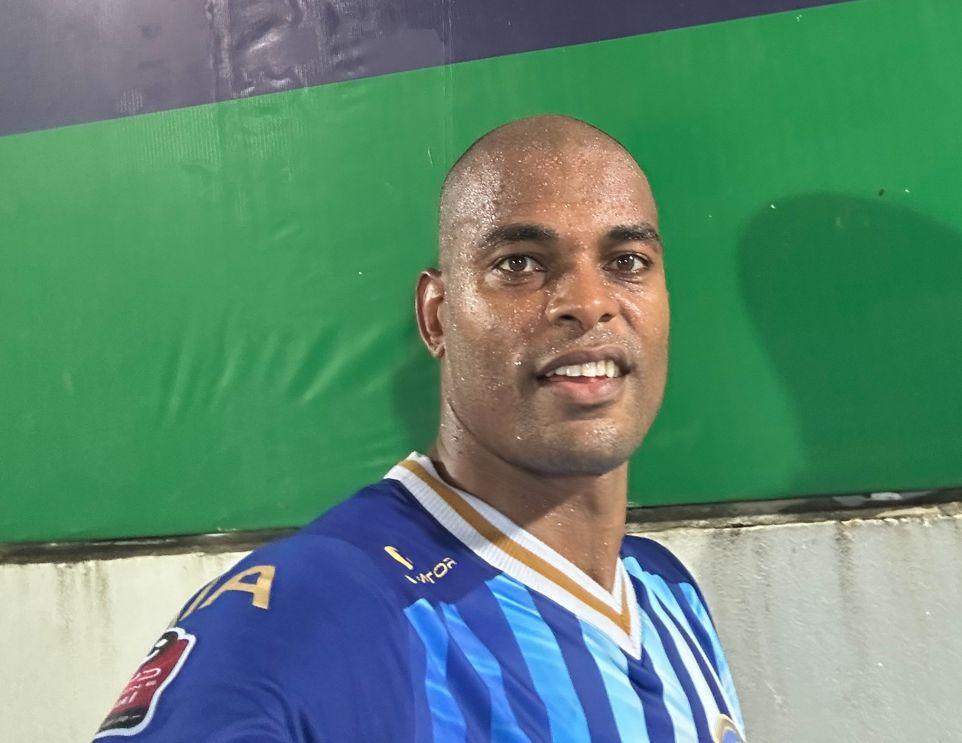
- Jorge Fellipe with Chonburi in 2025

Personal information
- Full name: Jorge Fellipe de Oliveira Figueiro
- Date of birth: 27 October 1988 (age 38)
- Place of birth: Brazil
- Height: 1.90 m (6 ft 3 in)
- Position: Defender

Team information
- Current team: Chonburi
- Number: 47

Youth career
- –2009: Monte Alegre
- 2009: Volyn Lutsk

Senior career*
| Years | Team | Apps | (Gls) |
| 2009–2010 | Juventude | 12 | (1) |
| 2010–2013 | Tombense | 0 | (0) |
| 2010 | → Figueirense (loan) | | |
| 2011 | → Náutico (loan) | 17 | (2) |
| 2011–2012 | → Paysandu (loan) | 3 | (0) |
| 2012 | → Duque de Caxias (loan) | 10 | (0) |
| 2012 | → América (loan) | 2 | (0) |
| 2013 | Boavista | 11 | (0) |
| 2013–2016 | Nova Iguaçu | 27 | (1) |
| 2016 | Madureira | 13 | (3) |
| 2016–2017 | Athletico Paranaense | 0 | (0) |
| 2017 | Madureira | 11 | (0) |
| 2017–2018 | CSA | 16 | (1) |
| 2018–2019 | Aves | 24 | (3) |
| 2019–2020 | Damac | 13 | (2) |
| 2020 | Farense | 3 | (0) |
| 2020–2021 | Al-Tai | 0 | (0) |
| 2021 | Lion City Sailors | 15 | (5) |
| 2022 | Académica de Coimbra | 9 | (2) |
| 2022 | Nongbua Pitchaya | 15 | (1) |
| 2023 | Lampang | 11 | (1) |
| 2023–2024 | Trat | 23 | (7) |
| 2024–2025 | Nongbua Pitchaya | 26 | (5) |
| 2025– | Chonburi | 20 | (2) |
- * Club domestic league appearances and goals as of 16:44, 25 March 2026 (UTC)

Jorge Fellipe de Oliveira Figueiro (born 27 October 1988) is a Brazilian professional footballer who plays as a defender for Chonburi.

== Career ==
Jorge Fellipe started his career with Juventude in Brazil where he made his professional debut in 2009.

In June 2016, Jorge Fellipe signed for Atlético Paranaense.

After winning the Serie C third division with CSA Fellipe most notable move was to Portugal to play for CD Aves in the Primeira Liga.

While at CD Aves he was part of the squad when they won the Portuguese Cup for the first time coming on in the 90th minute to help claim the honour. He left Aves at the end of the 2018–19 season.

In January 2020, Jorge Fellipe signed for Farense in the second tier of Portuguese football.

Fellipe in an interview with Lion City Sailors said "The Portuguese league is one of the most well-known leagues in Europe with many players who I used to watch only on TV, so my experience there was really important for my growth as a person and a player."

Jorge Fellipe joined Lion City Sailors in Singapore in 2021. He was a key player in the Sailors' championship win and was one of two of the team's players nominated for the league player of the year award.

In early 2022, Jorge Fellipe signed for Portuguese second-tier team Académica de Coimbra, citing a desire to help the club return to the top tier.

== Career statistics ==
As of match played 10 October 2021

Appearances and goals by club, season and competition
| Club | Season | League | | | National cup | | League cup | | Continental | | Total | |
| Club | Season | Division | Apps | Goals | Apps | Goals | Apps | Goals | Apps | Goals | Apps | Goals |
|---|---|---|---|---|---|---|---|---|---|---|---|---|
| Nova Iguaçu | 2013 | Série D | 6 | 1 | 0 | 0 | 0 | 0 | 0 | 0 | 6 | 1 |
| Nova Iguaçu | 2014 | Campeonato Carioca | 12 | 0 | 0 | 0 | 0 | 0 | 0 | 0 | 12 | 0 |
| Nova Iguaçu | 2015 | Campeonato Carioca | 6 | 0 | 0 | 0 | 0 | 0 | 0 | 0 | 6 | 0 |
| Nova Iguaçu | Total | | 24 | 1 | 0 | 0 | 0 | 0 | 0 | 0 | 24 | 1 |
| Athletico Paranaense | 2016 | Série A | 0 | 0 | 0 | 0 | 0 | 0 | 0 | 0 | 0 | 0 |
| Madureira | 2016 | Campeonato Carioca | 13 | 3 | 0 | 0 | 0 | 0 | 0 | 0 | 13 | 3 |
| Madureira | 2017 | Campeonato Carioca | 11 | 0 | 0 | 0 | 0 | 0 | 0 | 0 | 11 | 0 |
| Madureira | Total | | 24 | 3 | 0 | 0 | 0 | 0 | 0 | 0 | 24 | 3 |
| Centro Sportivo Alagoano | 2017 | Série C | 15 | 1 | 0 | 0 | 0 | 0 | 0 | 0 | 15 | 1 |
| Centro Sportivo Alagoano | 2018 | Série B | 1 | 0 | 0 | 0 | 0 | 0 | 0 | 0 | 1 | 0 |
| Centro Sportivo Alagoano | Total | | 16 | 1 | 0 | 0 | 0 | 0 | 0 | 0 | 16 | 1 |
| Aves | 2017–18 | Primeira Liga | 5 | 1 | 2 | 0 | 0 | 0 | 0 | 0 | 7 | 1 |
| Aves | 2018–19 | Primeira Liga | 19 | 2 | 1 | 0 | 2 | 0 | 0 | 0 | 22 | 2 |
| Aves | Total | | 24 | 3 | 3 | 0 | 2 | 0 | 0 | 0 | 29 | 3 |
| Damac FC | 2019–20 | Saudi Professional League | 13 | 2 | 1 | 0 | 0 | 0 | 0 | 0 | 14 | 2 |
| Farense | 2019–20 | Liga Portugal 2 | 3 | 0 | 0 | 0 | 0 | 0 | 0 | 0 | 3 | 0 |
| Al-Tai | 2020–21 | Saudi First Division League | 0 | 0 | 0 | 0 | 0 | 0 | 0 | 0 | 0 | 0 |
| Lion City Sailors | 2021 | Singapore Premier League | 15 | 5 | 0 | 0 | 0 | 0 | 0 | 0 | 15 | 5 |
| Académica de Coimbra | 2021–22 | Liga Portugal 2 | 9 | 2 | 0 | 0 | 0 | 0 | 0 | 0 | 9 | 2 |
| Career total | | | 40 | 10 | 2 | 0 | 3 | 1 | 0 | 0 | 45 | 11 |

== Honours ==
Centro Sportivo Alagoano

- Third-division (Serie C): 2017

Aves

- Taça de Portugal: 2017–18

Lion City Sailors

- Singapore Premier League: 2021
