= Kuraba Kondo =

Japanese footballer

Personal information
- Date of birth: 6 July 2002 (age 24)
- Place of birth: Tokushima, Japan
- Height: 1.70 m (5 ft 7 in)
- Position: Forward

Team information
- Current team: FC Tokushima
- Number: 11

Youth career
- Tamiya Victory
- –2020: Cerezo Osaka

Senior career*
Years	Team	Apps	(Gls)
2019–2020	Cerezo Osaka U-23	11	(1)
2021	Albirex Niigata (S)	16	(8)
2022	Balestier Khalsa	21	(7)
2022-	FC Tokushima	1	(0)

International career^{‡}
- Japan U15
2017–2018	Japan U16	12	(7)
- * Club domestic league appearances and goals as of 17:04, 2 May 2021 (UTC) ‡ National team caps and goals as of 17:04, 17 January 2021 (UTC)

Kuraba Kondo (近藤 蔵波, Kondo Kuraba; born 6 July 2002) is a Japanese footballer currently playing as a forward for FC Tokushima.

== Career statistics ==
=== Club ===
As of 4 Aug 22.

Appearances and goals by club, season and competition
Club	Season	League			National Cup		League Cup		Other		Total	
Club	Season	Division	Apps	Goals	Apps	Goals	Apps	Goals	Apps	Goals	Apps	Goals
Cerezo Osaka U-23	2019	J3 League	4	0	–		–		0	0	4	0
Cerezo Osaka U-23	2020	J3 League	7	1	–		–		0	0	7	1
Cerezo Osaka U-23	Total		11	1	0	0	0	0	0	0	11	1
Albirex Niigata (S)	2021	SPL	16	8	0	0	–		0	0	16	8
Balestier Khalsa	2022	SPL	27	7	1	2	–		0	0	28	9
Career total			54	16	1	2	0	0	0	0	55	18

== Honours ==
Japan U16

- AFC U-16 Championship: 2018
