= Hyrulnizam Juma'at =

Singaporean footballer (born 1986)

Personal information
- Full name: Mohamed Hyrulnizam bin Juma'at
- Date of birth: 14 November 1986 (age 40)
- Place of birth: Singapore
- Height: 1.81 m (5 ft 11 in)
- Position: Goalkeeper

Senior career*
Years	Team	Apps	(Gls)
2006–2009	Young Lions	9	(0)
2009–2011	Warriors FC	10	(0)
2012	LionsXII	3	(0)
2013	Warriors FC	3	(0)
2014	Tampines Rovers FC	12	(0)
2015–2016	Home United	26	(0)
2017–2018	Warriors FC	10	(0)
2019–2023	Albirex Niigata (S)	7	(0)
Total		80	(0)

International career
2009	Singapore U23	4	(0)
2012–2014	Singapore	4	(0)
- * Club domestic league appearances and goals

Mohamed Hyrulnizam bin Juma'at (born 14 November 1986) is a Singaporean former footballer who last played as a goalkeeper for Singapore Premier League club Albirex Niigata Singapore and the Singapore national football team. Hyrulnizam started his professional footballing career with S.League club Young Lions, and has played as a goalkeeper for the entirety of his career.

== Career ==
=== SAFFC ===
Hyrulnizam began his footballing career as part of the youth setup of SAFFC (now Warriors FC).

=== Young Lions ===
He eventually chose to sign for Young Lions in 2006.

=== Back to SAFFC ===
At the end of 2009, Hyrulnizam rejoined his boyhood club, Warriors FC. On 23 March 2010, Hyrulnizam made his AFC Champions League debut, coming on for Shahril Jantan in the 89th minute, keeping a clean sheet as well as two saves against Japan club, Gamba Osaka.

=== LionsXII ===
In 2012, he played for Malaysia Super League club LionsXII for a season before reuniting with Warriors FC once again in 2013. During his time with the LionsXII, he played second fiddle to Izwan Mahbud. He, however, grabbed his chances with both hands when Izwan was out injured, conceding only one goal in three games.

=== Warriors FC ===
Following his departure from the LionsXII, Hyrulnizam once again joined Warriors FC, replacing the outgoing Sharil Jantan.

=== Tampines Rovers ===
After the 2013 S.League season, Hyrulnizam signed for Tampines Rovers FC. His impressive performance during his stint with Tampines Rover FC led to him being nominated by Goal.com on 24 February 2014 as its Southeast Asia Player of the Week. Although Hyrulnizam was the first choice goalkeeper at a club for the first time in his career, he only managed a total of 19 appearances for the Stags in total due to a fibromatosis tumour on his right glute.

=== Home United ===
After a bright spell at Tampines Rover, he switched clubs once again, joining rivals Home United. He was retained for the 2016 S.League season.

=== Re-signing for Warriors FC ===
Hyrulnizam re-signed for boyhood club Warriors FC once again for the 2017 S.League season.

=== Albirex Niigata (S) ===
In 2019, He signed for Albirex Niigata (S).

== Career statistics ==
=== Club ===
As of 24 May 2021.

Club	Season	League			FA Cup		League Cup		Total	
Club	Season	Division	Apps	Goals	Apps	Goals	Apps	Goals	Apps	Goals
Warriors FC	2010	S.League	6	0	0	0	1	0	7	0
Warriors FC	2011	S.League	4	0	1	0	1	0	6	0
Warriors FC	Total		10	0	1	0	2	0	13	0
LionsXII	2012	Malaysia Super League	3	0	0	0	0	0	3	0
LionsXII	Total		3	0	0	0	0	0	3	0
Warriors FC	2013	S.League	3	0	0	0	3	0	6	0
Warriors FC	Total		3	0	0	0	3	0	6	0
Tampines Rovers	2014	S.League	12	0	0	0	0	0	12	0
Tampines Rovers	Total		12	0	0	0	0	0	12	0
Home United	2015	S.League	16	0	0	0	0	0	16	0
Home United	2016	S.League	10	0	0	0	4	0	14	0
Home United	Total		26	0	0	0	4	0	30	0
Warriors FC	2017	S.League	15	0	1	0	3	0	19	0
Warriors FC	2018	Singapore Premier League	0	0	0	0	0	0	0	0
Warriors FC	Total		15	0	1	0	3	0	19	0
Albirex Niigata (S)	2019	Singapore Premier League	1	0	0	0	0	0	1	0
Albirex Niigata (S)	2020	Singapore Premier League	0	0	0	0	0	0	0	0
Albirex Niigata (S)	2021	Singapore Premier League	0	0	0	0	0	0	0	0
Albirex Niigata (S)	2022	Singapore Premier League	1	0	0	0	0	0	1	0
Albirex Niigata (S)	2023	Singapore Premier League	0	0	0	0	0	0	0	0
Albirex Niigata (S)	Total		2	0	0	0	0	0	2	0
Career total			22	5	0	0	0	0	22	5

== International career ==
Hyrulnizam has represented Singapore's U23 side in the 2009 Southeast Asian Games, playing a total of 4 games during the competition, helping the team to a bronze medal.

On 1 June 2012, Hyrulnizam made his senior international debut for the Singapore national football team in a friendly match against Hong Kong. The match ended 1-0 in a Hong Kong victory. Following his international debut, he served as back-up to compatriots Hassan Sunny and Izwan Mahbud as the 3rd choice national goalkeeper. Hyrulnizam was called up during the 2011 AFC Asian Cup qualification in Qatar, the 2012 AFF Championship, and the 2014 FIFA World Cup qualifiers.

== Personal life ==
Hyrulnizam is currently studying at Republic Polytechnic and has stated that Petr Čech is his sporting hero.

== Honours ==
Albirex Niigata (S)

- Singapore Premier League: 2020, 2022, 2023
- Singapore Community Shield: 2023

=== International ===
==== Singapore ====
- AFF Championship: 2012

Singapore Under-23

- 2009 SEA Games: Bronze
