= Ong Yu En =

Singaporean footballer

Personal information
- Date of birth: 3 October 2003 (age 23)
- Place of birth: Singapore
- Height: 1.67 m (5 ft 6 in)
- Position: Midfielder

Team information
- Current team: Young Lions (on loan from Tampines Rovers)
- Number: 25

Youth career
- JSSL Singapore
- F17 Academy
- –2019: Singapore Sports School

Senior career*
Years	Team	Apps	(Gls)
2020–2021	Albirex Niigata (S)	22	(1)
2022–	Tampines Rovers	29	(1)
2025–	→ Young Lions (loan)	2	(0)

International career^{‡}
2025–	Singapore U23	2	(0)
- * Club domestic league appearances and goals as of 15:04, 11 January 2022 (UTC) ‡ National team caps and goals as of 29 September 2025

Ong Yu En (born 3 October 2003) is a Singaporean footballer who plays as a midfielder for Singapore Premier League club Young Lions on loan from Tampines Rovers.

== Club career ==
=== Albirex Niigata (S) ===
Ong started his professional football career by signing for the Singapore Premier League side, Albirex Niigata (S) on 16 December 2019.

On 18 October 2020, Ong made his professional debut with Albirex Niigata (S) against Young Lions by coming on as a substitution for Ryosuke Nagasawa in the 86th minute, playing till the end of the match.

Ong won his first-ever major trophy in professional football by winning the 2020 Singapore Premier League with Albirex Niigata (S).

=== Tampines Rovers ===
Yu En signed with Tampines Rovers at the start of the 2022 Singapore Premier League season.

==== South Korea stints ====
In December 2022, it was announced that Yu En with Fathullah Rahmat will train with K-League 1 sides, Incheon United U-18 and Suwon Samsung Bluewings U-18 team and senior squad of K-League 2 club, Cheonan City from 26 December 2022 to 5 January 2023.

==== 2025–26: Loan to Young Lions ====
Yu En was loaned to Young Lions ahead of the 2025–26 season.

== International career ==
In 2025, Yu En was called up to represent the Singapore under-23 for the 2026 AFC U-23 Asian Cup qualification.

On 29 September 2025, Yu En was first called up to the Singapore senior team for the 2027 AFC Asian Cup qualification matches against India on 9 and 14 October.

== Career statistics ==
=== Club ===
As of 16 March 2022.

Club	Season	League			FA Cup		Other		Total	
Club	Season	Division	Apps	Goals	Apps	Goals	Apps	Goals	Apps	Goals
Albirex Niigata Singapore	2020	Singapore Premier League	4	1	0	0	0	0	4	1
Albirex Niigata Singapore	2021	Singapore Premier League	18	0	0	0	0	0	18	0
Albirex Niigata Singapore	Total		22	1	0	0	0	0	22	1
Tampines Rovers	2022	Singapore Premier League	17	0	0	0	0	0	17	0
Tampines Rovers	2023	Singapore Premier League	0	0	0	0	0	0	0	0
Tampines Rovers	2025–26	Singapore Premier League	3	0	1	0	1	0	5	0
Tampines Rovers	Total		20	0	1	0	1	0	22	0
Young Lions	2025–26	Singapore Premier League	5	0	0	0	0	0	5	0
Young Lions	Total		5	0	0	0	0	0	5	0
Career total			39	1	0	0	0	0	39	1

== Honours ==
=== Club ===
==== Albirex Niigata (S) ====
- Singapore Premier League: 2020
