= Kazuki Hashioka =

Japanese footballer

Personal information
- Date of birth: 20 January 1997 (age 29)
- Place of birth: Urawa, Saitama, Japan
- Height: 1.75 m (5 ft 9 in)
- Position: Right back

Team information
- Current team: Aries FC Tokyo

Youth career
- FC Urawa
- –2014: Urawa Red Diamonds

College career
Years	Team	Apps	(Gls)
2015–2018	Meiji University		

Senior career*
Years	Team	Apps	(Gls)
2019	Tokyo 23 FC	3	(0)
2020–2021	Albirex Niigata (S)	35	(1)
2022–	Aries FC Tokyo	0	(0)
- * Club domestic league appearances and goals as of 9:30, 8 June 2022 (UTC)

Kazuki Hashioka (橋岡 和樹, Hashioka Kazuki; born 20 January 1997) is a Japanese footballer currently playing as a right back for Aries FC Tokyo.

== Club career ==
Having played in his native Japan with Tokyo 23 FC, Hashioka was announced as an Albirex Niigata Singapore player ahead of the 2020 season. After two years in Singapore, in which he was named captain for both, he returned to Japan to sign for Aries FC Tokyo.

== Personal life ==
Kazuki is the older brother of Japanese international Daiki Hashioka.

== Honours ==
=== Individual ===
- Singapore Premier League Team of the Year: 2020, 2021

== Career statistics ==
=== Club ===
As of 8 June 2022.

Club	Season	League			Cup		Other		Total	
Club	Season	Division	Apps	Goals	Apps	Goals	Apps	Goals	Apps	Goals
Tokyo 23 FC	2019	Kantō Soccer League	3	0	0	0	0	0	3	0
Albirex Niigata (S)	2020	SPL	14	1	–		0	0	14	1
Albirex Niigata (S)	2021	SPL	21	0	–		0	0	21	0
Albirex Niigata (S)	Total		35	1	0	0	0	0	35	1
Career total			38	1	0	0	0	0	38	1

== Honours ==
=== Albirex Niigata FC Singapore ===
- Singapore Premier League:
  - Champion: 2020
  - Runner-up: 2021
