= Ryoya Taniguchi =

Japanese footballer

Personal information
- Date of birth: 31 August 1999 (age 27)
- Place of birth: Kanazawa, Ishikawa, Japan
- Height: 1.75 m (5 ft 9 in)
- Position: Midfielder

Team information
- Current team: Geylang International
- Number: 23

Youth career
- Shonan SSS
- Espoir Hakusan FC
- –2019: Zweigen Kanazawa

Senior career*
Years	Team	Apps	(Gls)
2019	Zweigen Kanazawa	0	(0)
2019	→ Japan Soccer College (loan)	6	(1)
2020–2021	Albirex Niigata (S)	33	(13)
2022–2023	Balestier Khalsa	52	(33)
2024–	Geylang International	43	(20)
- * Club domestic league appearances and goals as of 10:40, 2 January 2022 (UTC)

Ryoya Taniguchi (谷口 遼弥, Taniguchi Ryoya; born 31 August 1999), better known as Taniguchi, is a Japanese professional footballer who currently plays either as an attacking-midfielder or central-midfielder for Singapore Premier League club Geylang International.

== Club career ==
=== Zweigen Kanazawa ===
Ryoya got promoted to the senior squad of Zweigen Kanazawa ahead of the 2018 J2 League season.

=== Japan Soccer College ===
In 2019, Ryoya was loaned to fifth tier league club, Japan Soccer College.

=== Albirex Niigata (S) ===
In early February 2020, Ryoya moved to Singapore to sign with Albirex Niigata (S) ahead of the 2020 Singapore Premier League season. On 29 February 2020, he scored his first goal for the club in his debut against Geylang International. Ryoya would then help the club to win the 2020 league title in his debut season. After making 33 appearances and scoring 14 goals in his two years stay at club, Ryoya would then signed a pre-contract agreement for Singapore Premier League side Balestier Khalsa on 27 October 2021.

=== Balestier Khalsa ===
On 1 January 2022, Ryoya was registered as a Balestier Khalsa player. He scored his first goal for the club against Tanjong Pagar United on 12 March 2022. Ryoya would then scored his first senior hat-trick against Lion City Sailors in a 5–3 home win on 2 October 2022.

On 10 March 2023, Ryoya scored a 90+10' min goal to turn the game from a 3–1 defeat to a 4–3 win which he grab a hat-trick against DPMM. He would go on to have his breakout season scoring 23 league goals in 24 appearances which he became the runners-up in the league goalscoring ranking 2 goals short away Maxime Lestienne 25 goals.

== Career statistics ==
=== Club ===
As of 1 Nov 26.

Club	Season	League			Cup		Other		Total	
Club	Season	Division	Apps	Goals	Apps	Goals	Apps	Goals	Apps	Goals
Zweigen Kanazawa	2019	J2 League	0	0	0	0	0	0	0	0
Japan Soccer College (loan)	2019	Hokushinetsu Football League	6	1	0	0	0	0	6	1
Japan Soccer College (loan)	Total		6	1	0	0	0	0	6	1
Albirex Niigata (S)	2020	Singapore Premier League	14	4	0	0	0	0	14	4
Albirex Niigata (S)	2021	Singapore Premier League	19	9	0	0	0	0	19	9
Albirex Niigata (S)	Total		33	13	0	0	0	0	33	13
Balestier Khalsa	2022	Singapore Premier League	28	10	4	1	0	0	32	11
Balestier Khalsa	2023	Singapore Premier League	24	23	3	1	0	0	27	24
Balestier Khalsa	Total		52	33	7	2	0	0	59	35
Geylang International	2024–25	Singapore Premier League	31	14	4	0	0	0	35	14
Geylang International	2025–26	Singapore Premier League	19	9	4	2	0	0	23	11
Geylang International	2026–27	Singapore Premier League	4	0	0	0	0	0	4	0
Geylang International	Total		54	23	8	2	0	0	62	25
Career total			145	70	15	4	0	0	160	74

== Honours ==
=== Club ===
Albirex Niigata Singapore

- Singapore Premier League: 2020

=== Individual ===
- Singapore Premier League Team of the Year: 2021, 2023
