= 2021 Singapore Premier League =

Singapore Premier League
- Season: 2021
- Dates: 13 March – 10 October 2021
- Champions: Lion City Sailors (3rd title)
- AFC Champions League: Lion City Sailors
- AFC Cup: Hougang United; Tampines Rovers
- Matches: 84
- Goals: 334 (3.98 per match)
- Top goalscorer: Tomoyuki Doi (19 goals)
- Biggest home win: Tampines Rovers 7–0 Young Lions (7 April 2021)
- Biggest away win: Geylang International 0–8 Lion City Sailors (11 April 2021)
- Highest scoring: Hougang United 7–3 Tampines Rovers (11 September 2021)
- Longest winning run: 6 matches Lion City Sailors
- Longest unbeaten run: 18 matches Lion City Sailors
- Longest winless run: 12 matches Young Lions
- Longest losing run: 6 matches Geylang International

The 2021 Singapore Premier League (also known as the AIA Singapore Premier League due to sponsorship reasons) was the 4th season of the Singapore Premier League, the top-flight Singaporean professional league for football clubs, since its rebranding in 2018.

The champions of the 2021 Singapore Premier League, Lion City Sailors, qualified for the AFC Champions League group stage automatically. The season began on 13 March and ended on 10 October. In the first part of the season, all matches were played behind closed doors.

== Format ==
1. SPL teams will play each other thrice.
2. Each team is able to register up to 25 players.
3. From 2021, Albirex is allowed to sign a maximum of 2 overage Singaporean players. As in 2019 and 2020, Albirex must have two Singaporeans in their starting lineup for each game.
4. Young Lions and Lion City Sailors to play their home games at Jalan Besar Stadium while Balestier Khalsa will play at Toa Payoh Stadium. Other stadiums used are: (1) Our Tampines Hub (Tampines Rovers and Geylang International), Hougang Stadium (Hougang United) and (3) Jurong East Stadium (Albirex Niigata and Tanjong Pagar United).
5. Teams will be equipped with Global Positioning Systems (GPS) device.
6. A maximum of four foreign players may be named or fielded in any one match.
7. Local SPL teams, excluding Albirex Niigata (S) and Young Lions, are required to have a minimum of six local U-23 players (born on or after 1 January 1998) for a squad size of 18 (minimum) to 25 (maximum) players. At least eight local U-30 players (born on or after 1 January 1991) have to be registered.
8. Players shall be allocated jersey numbers 1 to 40. Jersey numbers become available for allocation to new members after a player ceases to play.
9. 2019 champions, DPMM FC, will continue to sit out of the competition due to the restriction imposed by the Brunei Government.
10. 1st transfer window: 1 January to 20 March 2021
11. 2nd transfer window: 17 May to 13 June 2021

== Teams ==
A total of 8 teams competed in the league. Albirex Niigata (S) from Japan was the only foreign team invited.

=== Stadiums and locations ===
Locations of the 2018 Singapore Premier League teams from Singapore

Image	Team	Stadium	Capacity
	Albirex Niigata (S); Tanjong Pagar United	Jurong East Stadium	2,700
	Balestier Khalsa	Toa Payoh Stadium	3,800
	Hougang United	Hougang Stadium	3,800
	Lion City Sailors; Young Lions	Jalan Besar Stadium	6,000
	Tampines Rovers; Geylang International	Our Tampines Hub	5,000

=== Personnel and sponsors ===
Note: Flags indicate national team as has been defined under FIFA eligibility rules. Players may hold more than one non-FIFA nationality.

Team	Head coach	Captain	Kit manufacturer	Main shirt sponsor	Other shirt sponsors
Albirex Niigata (S)	(Japan) Keiji Shigetomi	(Japan) Kazuki Hashioka (Japan) Takahiro Tezuka (VC) (Japan) Ryoya Tanigushi (VC); Fairoz Hasan (VC)	Mizuno	Canon	Kirin; Kubota; Reeracoen; EnglishCentral; Lensmode; Gain City; Nippon Medical Care; Fitogether; Namics; Denka; SMBC; ACCEA Singapore; JTB; NSG; JPLUS+ Daiho Group; With You Global Creations; SD Aircon
Balestier Khalsa	(Croatia) Marko Kraljević	(Singapore) Fadli Kamis (Croatia) Kristijan Krajcek (VC)	Adidas	Jeep	Weston Corporation; Project Vaults; StarBalm; PSB Academy
Geylang International	(Singapore) Mohd Noor Ali	(Japan) Yuki Ichikawa (Singapore) Darren Teh (VC)	FBT	Epson	Aris Studio 23; Joydom Engineering; My Protein Singapore; Steel Industries; Springleaf Prata Place; Fightzone; TRUE Fitness
Hougang United	(Singapore) Clement Teo	(Singapore) Fabian Kwok (Singapore) Lionel Tan (VC) (Singapore) Nazrul Nazari (VC) (Singapore) Ridhuan Barudin (VC)	Warrix		SportCenter by Zup; Cafe Football (CF); The Arena
Lion City Sailors	(South Korea) Kim Do-hoon	(Singapore) Hassan Sunny (Singapore) Shahdan Sulaiman (VC)	Puma	SEA	Shopee; Garena
Tampines Rovers	(Singapore) Gavin Lee	(Singapore) Yasir Hanapi (Singapore) Daniel Bennett (VC) (Singapore) Syazwan Buhari (VC)	Mizuno	ANA Courier Express	StarBalm; The Black Hole Group; My Protein Singapore; Canadian 2 for 1 Pizza
Tanjong Pagar United	(Singapore) Hasrin Jailani	(Singapore) Faritz Abdul Hameed (Singapore) Delwinder Singh (VC)	Ad hoc Apparel	Tokyo Century	Samtrade Academy; StarBalm
Young Lions	(Singapore) Philippe Aw	(Singapore) Danish Irfan (Singapore) Syahrul Sazali (VC)	Nike		Catapult

== Coaching changes ==
Team	Outgoing coach	Manner of departure	Date of vacancy	Position in table	Incoming coach	Date of appointment
Young Lions	(Singapore) Nazri Nasir	Rested	15 January 2021	Pre-Season	(Singapore) Philippe Aw	15 January 2021
Lion City Sailors	(Australia) Aurelio Vidmar	Resigned	30 April 2021	2nd	(Singapore) Robin Chitrakar (interim)	1 May 2021
Lion City Sailors	(Singapore) Robin Chitrakar (interim)	NA	18 May 2021	2nd	(South Korea) Kim Do-hoon	18 May 2021

== Foreign players ==
Singapore Premier League clubs can sign a maximum of four foreign players in the 2021 season, up from three as compared to 2019. However, one of them has to be 21 years old or younger on 1 January 2021 (Or at the age of registration).

Albirex Niigata can sign up unlimited number of Singaporean players for the new season. Only 2 local player above 23 years old is allowed.

Players name in bold indicates the player was registered during the mid-season transfer window.

Team	Player 1	Player 2	Player 3	AFC Player	SG U-23 Player 1 U-21 Player	Former Players
Albirex Niigata (S)	(Singapore) Hyrulnizam Juma'at	(Singapore) Fairoz Hassan	(Singapore) Ong Yu En	(Singapore) Fikri Junaidi	(Singapore) Nicky Singh	(Singapore) Nathanael Chin
Albirex Niigata (S)	(Singapore) Junki Yoshimura	(Singapore) Sunny Tia	(Singapore) Kenji Austin	(Singapore) Ameer Maricar	(Singapore) Irsyad Azarudin	
Albirex Niigata (S)	(Singapore) **Hilman Norhisam**	(Singapore) Muhamad Ali Manaf				
Balestier Khalsa	(Croatia) Kristijan Krajcek	(Croatia) Šime Žužul	(Serbia) Ensar Brunčević	(Japan) Shuhei Hoshino	(France) Yann Weishaupt	
Geylang International	(Brazil) Matheus Moresche	(Netherlands) Barry Maguire	(Japan) Yuki Ichikawa	(Australia) **Danny Kim**		(Netherlands) Sylvano Comvalius
Hougang United	(Brazil) Gilberto Fortunato	(Kyrgyzstan) Maksat Dzhakybaliev	(Japan) Tomoyuki Doi	(Japan) Kaishu Yamazaki		
Lion City Sailors	(Brazil) Diego Lopes	(Brazil) Jorge Fellipe	(Croatia) Stipe Plazibat			(South Korea) Song Ui-young; Note 2
Tampines Rovers	(Serbia) Zehrudin Mehmedović	(Montenegro) Boris Kopitović	(Montenegro) Armin Bosnjak	(Japan) Kyoga Nakamura		
Tanjong Pagar United	(Brazil) Luiz Júnior	(Australia) Blake Ricciuto	(Japan) Reo Nishiguchi	(Japan) Shodai Nishikawa		

Note 1: From 2021, Albirex, a Japanese club, is allowed to sign a maximum of 2 Singaporean players above the age of 23.

Note 2: Song Ui-Young is granted Singapore citizenship on 21 August 2021.

== Results ==
=== League table ===
Pos	Team	Pld	W	D	L	GF	GA	GD	Pts	Qualification or relegation
1	Lion City Sailors	21	14	6	1	59	21	+38	48	Qualification for AFC Champions League group stage
2	Albirex Niigata (S) (Note: The foreign club – Albirex Niigata (S) – as well as the Football Association of Singapore (FAS) under-21 team, Young Lions, are ineligible for any AFC competition spots.)	21	13	7	1	50	19	+31	46	
3	Hougang United	21	10	4	7	48	40	+8	34	Qualification for AFC Cup group stage
4	Tampines Rovers	21	7	6	8	48	51	−3	27	Qualification for AFC Cup group stage
5	Tanjong Pagar United	21	5	7	9	36	49	−13	22	
6	Geylang International	21	6	2	13	33	52	−19	20	
7	Balestier Khalsa	21	5	4	12	34	52	−18	19	
8	Young Lions	21	4	4	13	26	50	−24	16	

Updated to match(es) played on 3 April 2021. Source: Singapore Premier League
Rules for classification: 1) points; 2) goal difference; 3) number of goals scored; 4) number of wins

=== Fixtures and results ===
Clubs will play each other three times for 21 matches each.

=== Matches 1–14 ===
Home \ Away	ALB	BAL	GEY	HOU	LCS	TAM	TPU	YLI
Albirex Niigata (S)		0–0	1–0	3–1	1–1	2–1	1–2	2–1
Balestier Khalsa	1–4		2–1	0–1	1–1	1–2	4–0	2–3
Geylang International	1–2	3–1		2–5	0–8	3–1	2–1	1–1
Hougang United	1–2	4–3	4–1		0–1	5–1	1–4	1–1
Lion City Sailors	2–2	4–1	2–1	1–3		3–3	3–1	1–0
Tampines Rovers	2–2	5–1	3–2	2–3	1–6		3–1	7–0
Tanjong Pagar United	0–6	2–2	1–3	3–3	0–5	2–2		1–1
Young Lions	0–3	3–3	2–4	0–1	1–3	0–4	0–4	

First match(es) will be played: 3 April 2021. Source: Flashscore
Legend: Blue = home team win; Yellow = draw; Red = away team win.
For upcoming matches, an "a" indicates there is an article about the rivalry between the two participants.

=== Matches 15–21 ===
Home \ Away	ALB	BAL	GEY	HOU	LCS	TAM	TPU	YLI
Albirex Niigata (S)		4–0	5–0	4–1		0–0		
Balestier Khalsa				3–2		5–2	1–0	
Geylang International		3–0			0–3		2–4	2–3
Hougang United			2–1			7–3		1–3
Lion City Sailors	1–1	4–1		1–1		4–1		
Tampines Rovers			1–1				2–2	2–1
Tanjong Pagar United	4–4			1–1	1–2			
Young Lions	0–1	4–2			1–3		1–2	

First match(es) will be played: 23 July 2021. Source: Flashscore
Legend: Blue = home team win; Yellow = draw; Red = away team win.
For upcoming matches, an "a" indicates there is an article about the rivalry between the two participants.

== Statistics ==
=== Top scorers ===
As of 10 October 2021

Rank	Player	Club	Goals
1	(Japan) Tomoyuki Doi	Hougang United	19
2	(Montenegro) Boris Kopitović	Tampines Rovers	16
3	(Croatia) Šime Žužul	Balestier Khalsa	15
3	(Japan) Kiyoshiro Tsuboi	Albirex Niigata (S)	15
4	(Croatia) Stipe Plazibat	Lion City Sailors	14
5	(Singapore) Gabriel Quak	Lion City Sailors	13
6	(Singapore) Amy Recha	Geylang International	12
7	(Brazil) Matheus Moresche	Geylang International	11
7	(Brazil) Luiz Júnior	Tanjong Pagar United	11
8	(Japan) Ryoya Tanigushi	Albirex Niigata (S)	9
8	(Japan) Reo Nishiguchi	Tanjong Pagar United	9
9	(Japan) Kuraba Kondo	Albirex Niigata (S)	8
10	(Singapore) Ilhan Fandi	Young Lions	7
10	(Singapore) Song Ui-young	Lion City Sailors	7

=== Clean sheets ===
As at 3 October 2021

Rank	Player	Club	Clean sheets
1	(Japan) Takahiro Koga	Albirex Niigata (S)	8
2	(Singapore) Hassan Sunny	Lion City Sailors	5
3	(Singapore) Syazwan Buhari	Tampines Rovers	3

=== Hat-tricks ===
As of 10 October 2021

Player	For	Against	Result	Date	Reference
(Japan) Tomoyuki Doi	Hougang United	Tampines Rovers	5–1	3 April 2021	
(Montenegro) Boris Kopitović	Tampines Rovers	Young Lions	7–0	7 April 2021	
(Brazil) Diego Lopes	Lion City Sailors	Geylang International	8–0	11 April 2021	
(Japan) Kiyoshiro Tsuboi	Albirex Niigata (S)	Tanjong Pagar United	6–0	17 April 2021	
(Japan) Kiyoshiro Tsuboi	Albirex Niigata (S)	Balestier Khalsa	4–1	25 April 2021	
(Croatia) Šime Žužul	Balestier Khalsa	Tampines Rovers	5–2	19 August 2021	
(Japan) Tomoyuki Doi	Hougang United	Tampines Rovers	7–3	11 September 2021	
(Japan) Kiyoshiro Tsuboi ^{4}	Albirex Niigata (S)	Tanjong Pagar United	4–4	10 October 2021	

^{4} Player scored 4 goals

=== Penalty missed ===
Player	For	Against	Date
(Croatia) Stipe Plazibat	Lion City Sailors	Albirex Niigata (S)	7 April 2021

== Awards ==
=== Monthly awards ===
Month	Player of the Month		Young Player of the Month		Coach of the Month		Goal of the Month	Ref
Month	Player	Club	Player	Club	Coach	Club	Player vs.	Ref
March	(Japan) Tomoyuki Doi	Hougang United	(Singapore) Khairin Nadim	Young Lions	(Singapore) Clement Teo	Hougang United	(South Korea) Song Ui-young vs. Tanjong Pagar (17 March 2021)	
April	(Croatia) Stipe Plazibat	Lion City Sailors FC	(Japan) Kiyoshiro Tsuboi	Albirex Niigata (S)	(Japan) Keiji Shigetomi	Albirex Niigata (S)	(Singapore) Gabriel Quak vs. Balestier Khalsa (18 April 2021)	
May	(Montenegro) Boris Kopitović	Tampines Rovers	(Singapore) Idraki Adnan	Hougang United	(Singapore) Clement Teo	Hougang United	(Japan) Kyoga Nakamura vs. Young Lions (2/5/2021)	
August	(Croatia) Šime Žužul	Balestier Khalsa	(Singapore) Ilhan Fandi	Young Lions	(Singapore) Hasrin Jailani	Tanjong Pagar United	(Brazil) Luiz Júnior vs. Albirex Niigata (S) (6/8/2021)	
September	(Brazil) Jorge Fellipe	Lion City Sailors FC	(Singapore) Nur Adam Abdullah	Lion City Sailors FC	(South Korea) Kim Do-hoon	Lion City Sailors FC	(Singapore) Fabian Kwok vs. Tampines Rovers (11/9/2021)	

== Singapore Premier League Awards night winners ==
Awards	Winners	Club
Player of the Year	(Japan) Tomoyuki Doi	Hougang United
Young Player of the Year	(Singapore) Nur Adam Abdullah	Lion City Sailors
Coach of the Year	(Singapore) Clement Teo	Hougang United
Top Scorer Award	(Japan) Tomoyuki Doi	Hougang United
Golden Glove	(Japan) Takahiro Koga	(Japan) Albirex Niigata (S)
Goal of the Year	(Singapore) Gabriel Quak vs. Balestier Khalsa (18 April 2021)	Lion City Sailors
Fair Play Award	(Japan) Albirex Niigata (S)	
Referee of the Year	(Singapore) Jansen Foo	—N/a

AIA Team of the Year
Goalkeeper	(Japan) Takahiro Koga (Albirex Niigata (S))			
Defence	(Japan) Kazuki Hashioka ( (Japan) Albirex Niigata (S))	(Japan) Shuya Yamashita ( (Japan) Albirex Niigata (S))	(Brazil) Jorge Fellipe (Lion City Sailors)	(Singapore) Nur Adam Abdullah (Lion City Sailors)
Midfield	(Japan) Kaishu Yamazaki (Hougang United)		(Japan) Ryoya Tanigushi ( (Japan) Albirex Niigata (S))	(Singapore) Shahdan Sulaiman (Lion City Sailors)
Attack	(Croatia) Šime Žužul (Balestier Khalsa)		(Croatia) Stipe Plazibat (Lion City Sailors)	(Japan) Tomoyuki Doi (Hougang United)
