= 2020 Young Lions FC season =

Young Lions
2020 season
- Chairman: Farehan Hussein
- Head coach: Nazri Nasir
- Stadium: Jurong West Stadium
Home colours	Away colours

The 2020 season was Young Lions' 17th consecutive season in the top flight of Singapore football and in the S.League.

== Squad ==
=== S.League squad ===
As of 26 Sept 2019.

Squad No.	Name	Nationality	Date of birth (age)	Last club	Contract start	Contract end
Goalkeepers
1	Nurshafiq Zaini	(Singapore)	26 March 1999 (age 27)	(Singapore) Tampines Rovers U19	2020	2020
18	Ridhwan Fikri	(Singapore)	29 April 1999 (age 27)	(Singapore) GFA Victoria FC	2020	2020
30	Veer Karan Sobti	(Singapore) (Hong Kong) (India)	6 May 2004 (age 22)	(Singapore) Turf City FC	2020	2020
32	Putra Anugerah	(Singapore) (Indonesia)	2 April 2000 (age 26)	(Singapore) Lion City Sailors U19	2020	2020
Defenders
2	Nazhiim Harman	(Singapore)	2 March 1999 (age 27)	(Singapore) GFA Victoria FC	2020	2020
3	Irfan Najeeb	(Singapore)	31 July 1999 (age 27)	(Singapore) SAFSA	2021	2021
4	Danish Irfan	(Singapore)	10 March 1999 (age 27)	(Singapore) Geylang International	2020	2020
5	Amer Hakeem	(Singapore)	8 November 1998 (age 28)	(Singapore) Hougang United U19	2020	2020
13	Shahib Masnawi	(Singapore)	4 August 2000 (age 26)	(Singapore) GFA Victoria FC	2020	2020
15	Asraf Zahid	(Singapore)	8 October 1999 (age 27)	(Singapore) Hougang United	2019	2020
16	Ryhan Stewart	(Singapore) (Wales) (Malaysia)	15 February 2000 (age 26)	(Singapore) Warriors FC	2020	2020
21	Sahffee Jubpre	(Singapore)	31 March 2001 (age 25)	(Singapore) Hougang United U19	2020	2020
22	Nur Adam Abdullah	(Singapore)	13 April 2001 (age 25)	(Singapore) FFA Under-18	2019	2020
23	Harhys Stewart	(Singapore) (Wales) (Malaysia)	20 March 2001 (age 25)	(Singapore) Hougang United U19	2020	2020
24	Danial Crichton	(Singapore) (Canada)	11 April 2003 (age 23)	(Singapore) Warriors FC U19	2020	2020
25	Akmal Azman	(Singapore)	21 November 2000 (age 25)	(Singapore) Tampines Rovers	2019	2020
28	Syed Akmal	(Singapore)	28 April 2000 (age 26)	(Singapore) FFA Under-18	2019	2020
45	Akram Azman	(Singapore)	21 November 2000 (age 25)	(Singapore) FFA Under-18	2019	2020
Midfielders
6	Jacob Mahler	(Singapore) (Denmark)	20 April 2000 (age 26)	(Singapore) FFA Under-18	2018	2020
8	Rezza Rezky	(Singapore)	8 November 2000 (age 26)	(Singapore) FFA Under-18	2019	2020
11	Rasaq Ishiekwene Akeem	(Singapore) (Nigeria)	16 June 2001 (age 25)	(Singapore) FFA Under-17	2019	2020
12	Amirul Haikal	(Singapore)	11 October 1999 (age 27)	(Singapore) SAFSA	2020	2020
17	Ilhan Fandi	(Singapore) (South Africa)	8 November 2002 (age 24)	(England) i2i Football Academy	2019	2020
20	Nor Hakim Redzuan	(Singapore)	21 October 2000 (age 26)	(Singapore) Hougang United U19	2020	2020
27	Bill Mamadou	(Singapore) (Mali)	8 September 2001 (age 25)	(Singapore) Lion City Sailors FC U19	2020	2020
31	Idraki Adnan	(Singapore)	13 March 1999 (age 27)	(Singapore) Tiong Bahru FC	2020	2020
41	Hami Syahin	(Singapore)	16 December 1998 (age 27)	(Singapore) Police SA	2020	2020
Forwards
7	Zamani Zamri	(Singapore)	31 May 2001 (age 25)	(Singapore) Albirex Niigata (S)	2020	2020
9	Fikri Junaidi	(Singapore)	2 April 2000 (age 26)	(Singapore) Geylang International U19	2020	2020
10	Shahrulnizam Mazlan	(Singapore)	5 September 2000 (age 26)	(Singapore) GFA Victoria FC	2020	2020
14	Marc Ryan Tan	(Singapore)	8 January 2002 (age 24)	(Singapore) FFA Under-18	2019	2020
19	Khairin Nadim	(Singapore)	8 May 2004 (age 22)	(Singapore) Woodlands Secondary School	2020	2020

== Coaching staff ==
Position	Name
Team Manager	(Singapore) Tan Qing Hui Samuel
Head team coach	(Singapore) Nazri Nasir
Assistant coach	(Japan) Koichiro Iizuka
Assistant coach	(Singapore) Fadzuhasny Juraimi
Goalkeeping coach	(Singapore) Rameshpal Singh
Physiotherapist	Vacant
Sports Trainers	(Singapore) Nasruldin Baharudin (Singapore) Muklis Sawit
Equipment Officer	(Singapore) Omar Mohamed

== Transfer ==
=== Pre-season transfer ===
==== In ====
Position	Player	Transferred From	Ref
Coach	(Singapore) Nazri Nasir	NA	Promoted
GK	(Singapore) (Hong Kong) (India) Veer Karan Sobti	(Singapore) Turf City FC	
GK	(Singapore) Ridhwan Fikri	(Singapore) GFA Victoria FC	
GK	(Singapore) Nurshafiq Zaini	(Singapore) Tampines Rovers U21	Season loan
DF	(Singapore) Akmal Azman	(Singapore) Tampines Rovers	Season Loan (NS)
DF	(Singapore) Sahffee Jubpre	(Singapore) Hougang United U21	
DF	(Singapore) (Wales) Harhys Stewart	(Singapore) Hougang United U21	
DF	(Singapore) (Wales) Ryhan Stewart	(Singapore) Warriors FC	
DF	(Singapore) (Canada) Danial Crichton	(Singapore) Warriors FC U21	
DF	(Singapore) Danish Irfan	(Singapore) Geylang International	Free
DF	(Singapore) Nazhiim Harman	(Singapore) GFA Victoria FC	
MF	(Singapore) Nor Hakim Redzuan	(Singapore) Hougang United	
MF	(Singapore) Amirul Haikal	(Singapore) SAFSA	
FW	(Singapore) Shahib Masnawi	(Singapore) GFA Victoria FC	
FW	(Singapore) Shahrulnizam Mazlan	(Singapore) GFA Victoria FC	
FW	(Singapore) Khairin Nadim	(Singapore) Woodlands Secondary School	
FW	(Singapore) Fikri Junaidi	(Singapore) Geylang International U21	Season loan

==== Out ====
Position	Player	Transferred To	Ref
Coach	(Singapore) Fandi Ahmad	(Singapore) FAS	
GK	(Singapore) Zharfan Rohaizad	(Singapore)	
GK	(Singapore) Kenji Syed Rusydi	(Singapore) Lion City Sailors	Loan Return
GK	(Singapore) Adib Hakim	(Singapore) Lion City Sailors	
GK	(Singapore) Dylan Christopher Goh	(Singapore) Geylang International U21	
GK	(Singapore) Danial Iliya	(Singapore) Tampines Rovers U21	
DF	(Singapore) Zulqarnaen Suzliman	(Singapore) Lion City Sailors	
DF	(Singapore) Ruzree Rohzaini	(Singapore) Warriors FC	Loan Return
DF	(Singapore) Lionel Tan	(Singapore) SAFSA	Loan Return
DF	(Singapore) Irfan Najeeb	(Singapore) SAFSA	Loan Return
DF	(Singapore) Syahrul Sazali	(Singapore) Tampines Rovers	Free
DF	(Singapore) Amer Hakeem	(Singapore) Hougang United	Loan Return
DF	(Singapore) Prakash Raj	(Singapore) Hougang United	Loan Return
DF	(Singapore) Rusyaidi Salime	(Singapore)	
MF	(Singapore) Joshua Pereira	(Singapore) Geylang International	Free
MF	(Singapore) Nur Luqman	(Singapore) Geylang International	Free
MF	(Singapore) Sharul Nizam	(Singapore) Albirex Niigata (S)	Free
MF	(Singapore) Gareth Low Jun Kit	(Singapore) Albirex Niigata (S)	Free
MF	(Singapore) Naqiuddin Eunos	(Singapore) Lion City Sailors	
MF	(Singapore) Saifullah Akbar	(Singapore) Lion City Sailors	Free
MF	(Singapore) Haiqal Pashia	(Singapore) Lion City Sailors	
MF	(Singapore) Syed Firdaus Hassan	(Singapore)	
FW	(Singapore) Syukri Bashir	(Singapore) Hougang United	Loan Return
FW	(Singapore) Syahadat Masnawi	(Singapore) Tanjong Pagar United	
FW	(Singapore) Danial Syafiq	(Singapore)	
FW	(Singapore) (Sweden) Katz Saul Ellison	(Singapore)	

==== Retained ====
Position	Player	Ref
DF	(Singapore) Nur Adam Abdullah	
DF	(Singapore) Asraf Zahid	On loan from Hougang United
DF	(Singapore) Syed Akmal	
DF	(Singapore) Akram Azman	On loan from Tampines Rovers
MF	(Singapore) (Denmark) Jacob William Mahler	
MF	(Singapore) (Nigeria) Rasaq Ishiekwene Akeem	
MF	(Singapore) Rezza Rezky	
FW	(Singapore) (South Africa) Ilhan Fandi	
FW	(Singapore) Marc Ryan Tan	

==== Trial ====
Position	Player	Trial @	Ref

=== Mid-season transfers ===
==== In ====
Position	Player	Transferred From	Ref
GK	(Singapore) (Indonesia) Putra Anugerah	(Singapore) Lion City Sailors U21	Season Loan
MF	(Singapore) Zamani Zamri	(Singapore) SAFSA	Season Loan
MF	(Singapore) (Mali) Bill Mamadou	(Singapore) Lion City Sailors U21	
DF	(Singapore) Irfan Najeeb	(Singapore) SAFSA	Season Loan
MF	(Singapore) Idraki Adnan	(Singapore) Tiong Bahru FC	
DF	(Singapore) Amer Hakeem	Free agent	
MF	(Singapore) Hami Syahin	(Singapore) Police SA	Season Loan

==== Out ====
Position	Player	Transferred To	Ref
DF	(Singapore) Qayyum Raishyan		

== Friendly ==
=== Pre-season friendly ===
Win Draw Loss

23 January 2020 1	Geylang International (Singapore)	0–3	(Singapore) Young Lions FC	Our Tampines Hub
			Rezza Rezky

1 February 2020 2	Young Lions FC (Singapore)	2–0	Singapore Cricket Club	Jalan Besar Stadium
	Rezza Rezky; Fikri Junaidi

8 February 2020 3	Young Lions FC (Singapore)	0–4	(Singapore) SAFSA	Jalan Besar Stadium

16 February 2020 4	Albirex Niigata (S) (Singapore)	3–1	(Singapore) Young Lions FC	Jurong East Stadium
	Doi Tomoyuki; Ryoya Tanigushi		Ilhan Fandi

19 February 2020 5	Young Lions FC (Singapore)	cancelled	(Singapore) Balestier Khalsa	Jalan Besar Stadium

19 February 2020 5	Young Lions FC (Singapore)	1–1	(Singapore) Tanjong Pagar United	Jalan Besar Stadium
	Rezza Rezky		Luiz Júnior

21 February 2020 6	Young Lions FC (Singapore)	2–5	(Singapore) Lion City Sailors F.C.	Bishan Stadium
	Ilhan Fandi; Marc Ryan Tan		Andy Pengelly; Iqram Rifqi; Haiqal Paisha

== Team statistics ==
=== Appearances and goals ===
As of 15 June 2020

Numbers in parentheses denote appearances as substitute.

No.	Pos.	Player	Sleague		Total	
No.	Pos.	Player	Apps.	Goals	Apps.	Goals
1	GK	(Singapore) Nurshafiq Zaini	8	0	8	0
2	DF	(Singapore) Nazhiim Harman	0	0	0	0
3	DF	(Singapore) Irfan Najeeb	4(2)	0	6	0
4	DF	(Singapore) Danish Irfan	6(3)	0	9	0
5	DF	(Singapore) Amer Hakeem	2(1)	0	3	0
6	MF	(Singapore) (Denmark) Jacob Mahler	14	3	14	3
7	FW	(Singapore) Zamani Zamri	4(3)	1	7	1
8	MF	(Singapore) Rezza Rezky	2	0	2	0
9	FW	(Singapore) Fikri Junaidi	1(2)	0	3	0
10	FW	(Singapore) Shahrulnizam Mazlan	8(2)	1	10	1
11	MF	(Singapore) (Nigeria) Rasaq Akeem	2	0	2	0
12	MF	(Singapore) Amirul Haikal	10(1)	0	11	0
13	FW	(Singapore) Shahib Masnawi	5(2)	0	7	0
14	FW	(Singapore) Marc Ryan Tan	2(7)	0	9	0
15	DF	(Singapore) Asraf Zahid	0	0	0	0
16	DF	(Singapore) (Wales) Ryhan Stewart	8(2)	2	10	2
17	MF	(Singapore) (South Africa) Ilhan Fandi	5(3)	2	8	2
18	GK	(Singapore) Ridhwan Fikri	6	0	6	0
19	FW	(Singapore) Khairin Nadim	8(4)	3	12	3
20	MF	(Singapore) Nor Hakim Redzuan	0(2)	0	2	0
21	DF	(Singapore) Sahffee Jubpre	8(2)	0	10	0
22	DF	(Singapore) Nur Adam Abdullah	13	0	13	0
23	DF	(Singapore) (Wales) Harhys Stewart	10(1)	0	11	0
24	DF	(Singapore) (Canada) Danial Crichton	5(1)	0	6	0
25	DF	(Singapore) Akmal Azman	2(2)	0	4	0
27	MF	(Singapore) (Mali) Bill Mamadou	2(4)	0	6	0
28	DF	(Singapore) Syed Akmal	11(2)	0	13	0
30	GK	(Singapore) (Pakistan) Veer Karan Sobti	0	0	0	0
31	MF	(Singapore) Idraki Adnan	3(4)	0	7	0
32	GK	(Singapore) (Indonesia) Putra Anugerah	0	0	0	0
41	MF	(Singapore) Hami Syahin	4(1)	0	5	0
45	DF	(Singapore) Akram Azman	2	0	2	0

== Competitions ==
=== Singapore Premier League ===
Win Draw Loss

1 March 2020 1	Young Lions FC (Singapore)	1–4	(Singapore) Hougang United	Jurong West Stadium
	Ilhan Fandi 57'; Nur Adam Abdullah (yellow card) 72'	Report	Stipe Plazibat 7' 43' 90+1'; Jordan Nicolas Vestering 35' (yellow card) 71'; Farhan Zulkifli (yellow card) 38'; Afiq Noor (yellow card) 90'	Referee: G. Letchman; Man of the Match: (Croatia) Stipe Plazibat

11 March 2020 2	Geylang International (Singapore)	3–0	(Singapore) Young Lions FC	Our Tampines Hub
	Iqbal Hussain 18' 57'; Khairul Nizam 75'; Noor Ariff (yellow card) 44'; Firdaus Kasman (yellow card) 45'; Barry Maguire (yellow card) 72'; Joshua Pereira (yellow card) 83'	Report	Jacob Mahler (yellow card) 88'	Attendance: 1,178; Referee: Nathan Chan; Man of the Match: (Singapore) Iqbal Hussain

14 March 2020 3	Young Lions FC (Singapore)	0–2	(Singapore) Balestier Khalsa	Jurong West Stadium
	Harhys Stewart (yellow card) 33'; Danish Irfan (yellow card) 74'	Report	Hazzuwan Halim 32'; Ensar Brunčević 76' (yellow card) 29'; Ahmad Syahir (yellow card) 41'; C. Aarish Kumar (yellow card) 45+1'; Zulfadhmi Suzliman (yellow card) 62' (yellow-red card) 71'	Attendance: 0 (Note: Due to Covid 19, this match is played behind closed door.); Referee: Mohd Syarqawi; Man of the Match: (Singapore) Hazzuwan Halim

18 October 2020 4 (Rescheduled) (Note: The match is postponed following the coronavirus pandemic.)	Young Lions FC (Singapore)	0–4	(Singapore) Albirex Niigata (S)	Jurong West Stadium
	Khairin Nadim (yellow card) 44'; Shahib Masnawi (yellow card) 49'	Report	Ryoya Tanigushi 7'; Reo Nishiguchi 12'; Ryosuke Nagasawa 65'; Tomoyuki Doi 73'; Hiroyoshi Kamata (yellow card) 38'	Attendance: 0 Referee: Juherman Zaiton; Man of the Match: (Japan) Ryosuke Nagasawa

25 October 2020 5 (Rescheduled)	Young Lions FC (Singapore)	2–1	(Singapore) Tanjong Pagar United	Jurong West Stadium
	Jacob Mahler 54' (yellow card) 77'; Shahrulnizam Mazlan 68'; Amirul Haikal (yellow card) 59'; Nur Adam Abdullah (yellow card) 76'; Sahffee Jubpre (yellow card) 90'; Irfan Najeeb (yellow card) 90+2'	Report	Luiz Júnior 74'; Syabil Hisham (yellow card) 56'	Attendance: 0 Referee: Syarqawi Buhari; Man of the Match: (Singapore) Jacob Mahler

1 November 2020 6 (Rescheduled)	Lion City Sailors F.C. (Singapore)	5–0	(Singapore) Young Lions FC	Bishan Stadium
	Adam Swandi 71'; Stipe Plazibat 76' 82' (pen.); Gabriel Quak 90+1' (yellow card) 27'; Saifullah Akbar (yellow card) 37'; Haiqal Pashia (yellow card) 41'	Report	Jacob Mahler 46' (o.g.); Shahib Masnawi (yellow card) 17'; Nur Adam Abdullah (yellow card) 32'	Attendance: 0 Referee: Jansen Foo; Man of the Match: (Singapore) Gabriel Quak

4 November 2020 7 (Rescheduled)	Tampines Rovers (Singapore)	1–0	(Singapore) Young Lions FC	Our Tampines Hub
	Madhu Mohana 25'	Report	Jacob Mahler (yellow card) 38'; Ryhan Stewart (yellow card) 69'; Irfan Najeeb (yellow card) 72'	Attendance: 0 Referee: Lim Liang Yi; Man of the Match: (Japan) Kyoga Nakamura

12 November 2020 8 (Rescheduled)	Hougang United (Singapore)	4–1	(Singapore) Young Lions FC	Hougang Stadium
	Zac Anderson 17'; Charlie Machell 46'; Shawal Anuar 80'; Anders Aplin 84'; Shahfiq Ghani (yellow card) 11' (yellow-red card) 45'; Daniel Ong (yellow card) 28'; Nikesh Singh (yellow card) 40'	Report	Jacob Mahler 28' (pen.); Syed Akmal (yellow card) 16'; Nur Adam Abdullah (yellow card) 26'; Ryhan Stewart (yellow card) 36'; Hami Syahin (yellow card) 51' (yellow-red card) 70'	Attendance: 0 Referee: Muhammad Zulfiqar; Man of the Match: (Singapore) Anders Aplin

17 November 2020 9 (Rescheduled)	Young Lions FC (Singapore)	1–3	(Singapore) Tampines Rovers	Jurong West Stadium
	Khairin Nadim 20'; Shahib Masnawi (yellow card) 24'; Nurshafiq Zaini (yellow card) 83'	Report	Jordan Webb 50' 70' 84' (pen.); Shah Shahiran (yellow card) 35'; Kyoga Nakamura (yellow card) 39'; Ryaan Sanizal (yellow card) 46'; Irwan Shah (yellow card) 60'; Madhu Mohana (yellow card) 79'	Attendance: 0 Referee: Ahmad A'Qashah; Man of the Match: (Canada) Jordan Webb

21 November 2020 10 (Rescheduled)	Balestier Khalsa (Singapore)	1–2	(Singapore) Young Lions FC	Bishan Stadium
	R Aaravin 57'; Kristijan Krajcek (yellow card) 39'; Fadli Kamis (yellow card) 45' (red card) 61'	Report	Jacob Mahler 45+1' (pen.); Ryhan Stewart 86'; Harhys Stewart (yellow card) 36'; Nur Adam Abdullah (yellow card) 37'; Ryhan Stewart (yellow card) 38'; Amirul Haikal (yellow card) 75'	Attendance: 0 Referee: Y. Sathyakumar; Man of the Match: (Singapore) Ryhan Stewart

25 November 2020 11 (Rescheduled)	Albirex Niigata (S) (Singapore)	2–0	(Singapore) Young Lions FC	Jurong East Stadium
	Ong Yu En 4' (yellow card) 20'; Kazuki Hashioka 67'	Report	Bill Mamadou (yellow card) 57'; Sahffee Jubpre (yellow card) 59'	Attendance: 0 Referee: Juherman Zaiton; Man of the Match: (Singapore) Nurshafiq Zaini

29 November 2020 12 (Rescheduled)	Young Lions FC (Singapore)	0–4	(Singapore) Lion City Sailors F.C.	Jurong West Stadium
		Report	Arshad Shamim 33' 57'; Song Ui-young 40' (pen.); Gabriel Quak 72'; Abdil Qaiyyim Mutalib (yellow card) 4'; Kaishu Yamazaki (yellow card) 12'	Attendance: 0 Referee: Lim Liang Yi; Man of the Match: (Singapore) Gabriel Quak

2 December 2020 13 (Rescheduled)	Young Lions FC (Singapore)	1–2	(Singapore) Geylang International	Jurong West Stadium
	Zamani Zamri 80' (pen.); Syed Akmal (yellow card) 45+3'; Harhys Stewart (yellow card) 66'; Ilhan Fandi (yellow card) 70'	Report	Darren Teh 51' (yellow card) 81'; Amy Recha 86' (pen.); Iqbal Hussain (yellow card) 19'; Azri Suhaili (yellow card) 21'; Christopher van Huizen (yellow card) 61'; Khairul Nizam (red card) 61'	Attendance: 0 Referee: Y. Sathyakumar; Man of the Match: (Singapore) Christopher van Huizen

5 December 2020 14 (Rescheduled)	Tanjong Pagar United (Singapore)	2–4	(Singapore) Young Lions FC	Jurong East Stadium
	Luiz Júnior 66' (pen.) 90+2'; Raihan Rahman (yellow card) 61'; Syabil Hisham (yellow card) 78'	Report	Khairin Nadim 13' 85'; Ryhan Stewart 45'; Ilhan Fandi 45+2'; Syed Akmal (yellow card) 3'; Danial Crichton (yellow card) 10'	Attendance: 0 Referee: Farhan Mohd; Man of the Match: (Singapore) Khairin Nadim

Pos	Team	Pld	W	D	L	GF	GA	GD	Pts	Qualification or relegation
4	Geylang International	14	6	2	6	18	22	−4	20	Qualification for AFC Cup group stage
5	Balestier Khalsa	14	5	4	5	22	28	−6	19	
6	Hougang United	14	4	3	7	19	24	−5	15	
7	Young Lions (Note: The foreign club – Albirex Niigata (S) – as well as the Football Association of Singapore (FAS) under-21 team, Young Lions, are ineligible for any AFC competition spots.)	14	3	0	11	12	38	−26	9	
8	Tanjong Pagar United	14	0	5	9	14	33	−19	5	

Source: Singapore Premier League
Rules for classification: 1) points; 2) goal difference; 3) number of goals scored; 4) number of wins
