= 2019 Young Lions FC season =

Young Lions
2019 season
- Chairman: Farehan Hussein
- Head coach: Fandi Ahmad
- Stadium: Jalan Besar Stadium
Home colours	Away colours

The 2019 season was Young Lions' 16th consecutive season in the top flight of Singapore football and in the S.League.

== Squad ==
=== S.League squad ===
As of 26 Feb 2019.

Squad No.	Name	Nationality	Date of birth (age)	Last club
Goalkeepers
18	Zharfan Rohaizad	(Singapore)	21 February 1997 (age 29)	(Singapore) FFA Under-18
23	Kenji Syed Rusydi	(Singapore)	12 July 1998 (age 28)	(Singapore) Home United
30	Adib Hakim	(Singapore)	9 March 1998 (age 28)	(Singapore) FFA Under-18
Defenders
2	Asraf Zahid	(Singapore)	8 October 1999 (age 27)	(Singapore) Hougang United
4	Ruzree Rohzaini	(Singapore)	19 October 1997 (age 29)	(Singapore) Warriors FC
5	Irfan Najeeb	(Singapore)	31 July 1999 (age 27)	(Singapore) SAFSA
7	Zulqarnaen Suzliman	(Singapore)	29 March 1998 (age 28)	(Singapore) FFA Under-17
12	Syahrul Sazali	(Singapore)	3 June 1998 (age 28)	(Singapore) FFA Under-18
13	Amer Hakeem	(Singapore)	8 November 1998 (age 28)	(Singapore) Hougang United Prime League
16	Akram Azman	(Singapore)	21 November 2000 (age 25)	(Singapore) FFA Under-18
21	Prakash Raj	(Singapore)	11 June 1998 (age 28)	(Singapore) Hougang United Prime League
22	Nur Adam Abdullah	(Singapore)	13 April 2001 (age 25)	(Singapore) FFA Under-18
25	Rusyaidi Salime	(Singapore)	25 April 1998 (age 28)	(Singapore) FFA Under-17
26	Lionel Tan	(Singapore)	5 June 1997 (age 29)	(Singapore) SAFSA
28	Syed Akmal	(Singapore)	28 April 2000 (age 26)	(Singapore) FFA Under-18
31	Qayyum Raishyan	(Singapore)	5 December 2000 (age 25)	(Singapore) FFA Under-17
Midfielders
6	Jacob William Mahler	(Singapore) (Denmark)	20 April 2000 (age 26)	(Singapore) FFA Under-18
8	Joshua Pereira	(Singapore)	10 October 1997 (age 29)	(Singapore) FFA Under-18
10	Saifullah Akbar	(Singapore)	31 January 1999 (age 27)	(Singapore) Tampines Rovers Prime League
11	Haiqal Pashia	(Singapore)	29 November 1998 (age 27)	(Singapore) FFA Under-18
14	Rezza Rezky	(Singapore)	8 November 2000 (age 26)	(Singapore) FFA Under-18
15	Syed Firdaus Hassan	(Singapore)	30 May 1998 (age 28)	(Singapore) Home United Prime League
17	Naqiuddin Eunos	(Singapore)	1 December 1997 (age 28)	Free Agent
20	Nur Luqman	(Singapore)	20 June 1998 (age 28)	(Singapore) Warriors FC
24	Rasaq Ishiekwene Akeem	(Singapore) (Nigeria)	16 June 2001 (age 25)	(Singapore) FFA Under-17
27	Sharul Nizam	(Singapore)	2 June 1997 (age 29)	Free Agent
32	Gareth Low Jun Kit	(Singapore)	28 February 1997 (age 29)	(Singapore) SAFSA
Forwards
3	Syukri Bashir	(Singapore)	11 April 1998 (age 28)	(Singapore) Hougang United
9	Danial Syafiq	(Singapore)	29 December 1999 (age 26)	(Singapore) FFA Under-18
19	Ilhan Fandi	(Singapore)	8 November 2002 (age 24)	(England) i2i Football Academy
29	Marc Ryan Tan	(Singapore)	8 January 2002 (age 24)	(Singapore) FFA Under-18
33	Syahadat Masnawi	(Singapore)	7 November 2001 (age 25)	(Singapore) FFA Under-17
35	Katz Saul Ellison	(Singapore) (Sweden)	24 November 2000 (age 25)	(Singapore) FFA Under-18
Players left during season
4	Adam Hakeem	(Singapore)	17 March 1997 (age 29)	Free Agent
19	Naufal Azman	(Singapore)	10 July 1998 (age 28)	Free Agent

== Coaching staff ==
Position	Name
Team Manager	(Singapore) Farehan Hussein
Head team coach	(Singapore) Fandi Ahmad
Assistant coach	(Singapore) Nazri Nasir
Assistant coach	(Singapore) S. Subramani
Goalkeeping coach	(Singapore) Chua Lye Heng
Physiotherapist	Vacant
Sports Trainers	(Singapore) Nasruldin Baharudin (Singapore) Muklis Sawit
Equipment Officer	(Singapore) Omar Mohamed

== Transfer ==
=== Pre-season transfer ===
==== In ====
Position	Player	Transferred From	Ref
GK	(Singapore) Kenji Syed Rusydi	(Singapore) Home United	Season loan
DF	(Singapore) Nur Adam Abdullah	(Singapore) FFA Under-18	
DF	(Singapore) Irfan Najeeb	(Singapore) SAFSA	Season loan (NS)
DF	(Singapore) Asraf Zahid	(Singapore) Hougang United	Season loan
DF	(Singapore) Akram Azman	(Singapore) FFA Under-18	
DF	(Singapore) Syed Akmal	(Singapore) FFA Under-18	
DF	(Singapore) Lionel Tan	(Singapore) SAFSA (NFL Club)	Season loan (From Hougang Utd)
DF	(Singapore) Qayyum Raishyan	(Singapore) FFA Under-17	
MF	(Singapore) Rezza Rezky	(Singapore) FFA Under-18	
MF	(Singapore) (Nigeria) Rasaq Akeem	(Singapore) FFA Under-18	
MF	(Singapore) Nur Luqman	(Singapore) Warriors FC	Season loan
MF	(Singapore) Abdul Rasaq	(Singapore) FFA Under-18	
MF	(Singapore) Gareth Low Jun Kit	(Singapore) SAFSA (NFL Club)	Season loan (From Hougang Utd)
FW	(Singapore) Katz Saul Ellison	(Singapore) FFA Under-18	
FW	(Singapore) Marc Ryan Tan	(Singapore) FFA Under-18	
FW	(Singapore) Syahadat Masnawi	(Singapore) FFA Under-17	
FW	(Singapore) Syukri Bashir	(Singapore) Hougang United	Season loan

==== Out ====
Position	Player	Transferred To	Ref
GK	(Singapore) Hairul Syirhan	(Singapore) Geylang International	
GK	(Singapore) Ridhwan Aban	(Singapore) GFA Victoria FC	
DF	(Singapore) R Aaravin	(Singapore) Warriors FC	
DF	(Singapore) Taufiq Muqminin	(Singapore) Home United	
DF	(Singapore) (South Africa) Irfan Fandi	(Thailand) Bangkok Glass	
DF	(Singapore) Nazhiim Harman	(Singapore) GFA Victoria FC	
DF	(Singapore) Ariyan Shamsuddin	(Singapore) Hougang United	Loan Return
DF	(Singapore) Irfan Asyraf Aziz	(Singapore) Tiong Bahru FC (NFL)	
DF	(Singapore) Akmal Azman	(Singapore) Tampines Rovers	
DF	(Singapore) Zakri Ee Kai Ren	(Singapore) Tampines Rovers	
DF	(Singapore) Hamizan Hisham	(Singapore) Tampines Rovers	
DF	(Singapore) Alif Iskandar	(Singapore) Hougang United	
MF	(Singapore) Timothy David Yeo	(Singapore) Hougang United	
MF	(Singapore) Joel Chew Joon Herng	(Singapore) Tampines Rovers	
MF	(Singapore) Firas Irwan	(Singapore) Albirex Niigata (S)	Free
MF	(Singapore) Aniq Iskandar	(Singapore) Warriors FC	Loan Return
MF	(Singapore) Hami Syahin	(Singapore) Home United	
MF	(Singapore) Asshukrie Wahid	(Singapore) Geylang International	Loan Return
MF	(Singapore) Amirul Hakim		
FW	(Singapore) Ifwat Ismail	(Singapore) Geylang International	Loan Return
FW	(Singapore) (South Africa) Ikhsan Fandi	(Norway) Raufoss IL	Free

==== Retained ====
Position	Player	Ref
GK	(Singapore) Adib Hakim	
GK	(Singapore) Zharfan Rohaizad	
DF	(Singapore) Zulqarnaen Suzliman	
DF	(Singapore) Syahrul Sazali	
DF	(Singapore) Amer Hakeem	
DF	(Singapore) Adam Hakeem	
DF	(Singapore) Prakash Raj	
DF	(Singapore) Rusyaidi Salime	
MF	(Singapore) Saifullah Akbar	2 Years contract till 2019
MF	(Singapore) Joshua Pereira	2 Years contract till 2019
MF	(Singapore) Haiqal Pashia	
MF	(Singapore) (Denmark) Jacob William Mahler	
MF	(Singapore) Sharul Nizam	
MF	(Singapore) Naqiuddin Eunos	
MF	(Singapore) Syed Firdaus Hassan	
FW	(Singapore) Danial Syafiq	
FW	(Singapore) Naufal Azman	

==== Trial ====
Position	Player	Trial @	Ref
FW	(Singapore) (South Africa) Ikhsan Fandi	(Norway) Raufoss IL	

=== Mid-season transfer ===
==== In ====
Position	Player	Transferred From	Ref
DF	(Singapore) Irfan Najeeb	(Singapore) SAFSA (NFL Club)	Season loan (From Tampines Rovers)
DF	(Singapore) Ruzree Rohzaini	(Singapore) Warriors FC	Season loan
FW	(Singapore) (South Africa) Ilhan Fandi	(England) i2i Football Academy	

==== Out ====
Position	Player	Transferred To	Ref
DF	(Singapore) Adam Hakeem		

== Friendly ==
=== Pre-season friendly ===
Win Draw Loss

16 January 2019 1	PKNS FC (Malaysia)	3–0	(Singapore) Young Lions	Jalan Besar Stadium
	Romel Morales 34'; K. Gurusamy 46', 87'

2 February 2019 2	Jungfrau Punggol FC (Singapore)	1–3	(Singapore) Young Lions	Jalan Besar Stadium

Tour of Malaysia (20 to 27 January)

22 January 2019 1	PDRM FA (Malaysia)	1–0	(Singapore) Young Lions FC	Bandar Tun Razak, Kuala Lumpur
2045hours	Fauzi Pilus			Stadium: Kuala Lumpur Stadium

24 January 2019 2	Kuala Lumpur FA (Malaysia)	4–0	(Singapore) Young Lions FC	Bandar Tun Razak, Kuala Lumpur
2045hours	Paulo Josué 24'; Sylvano Comvalius 40', 75'; Guilherme de Paula Lucrécio 44'	Report		Stadium: Kuala Lumpur Stadium

26 January 2019 3	Langkawi International FC (Malaysia)	1–1	(Singapore) Young Lions FC	Bandar Tun Razak, Kuala Lumpur
2045hours				Stadium: Kuala Lumpur Stadium

=== Mid-season friendly ===
==== Tour of Thailand ====
Win Draw Loss

19 June 2019 1	Bangkok United F.C. (Thailand)	4–2	(Singapore) Young Lions FC	Rangsit, Bangkok
			Sharul Nizam; Rasaq Ishiekwene Akeem	Stadium: Thammasat Stadium

22 June 2019 2	Chonburi F.C. (Thailand)	0–0	(Singapore) Young Lions FC	Chonburi Province, Chonburi
				Stadium: Chonburi Stadium

== Team statistics ==
=== Appearances and goals ===
As of 15 September 2018

Numbers in parentheses denote appearances as substitute.

No.	Pos.	Player	Sleague		Total	
No.	Pos.	Player	Apps.	Goals	Apps.	Goals
2	DF	(Singapore) Asraf Zahid	7(4)	0	11	0
3	FW	(Singapore) Syukri Bashir	6(3)	2	9	2
4	MF	(Singapore) Ruzree Rohzaini	0(1)	0	1	0
5	DF	(Singapore) Irfan Najeeb	13	0	13	0
6	MF	(Singapore) (Denmark) Jacob William Mahler	24	3	24	3
7	DF	(Singapore) Zulqarnaen Suzliman	20(1)	1	21	1
8	MF	(Singapore) Joshua Pereira	18(2)	1	20	1
9	FW	(Singapore) Danial Syafiq	0(1)	0	1	0
10	MF	(Singapore) Saifullah Akbar	15(6)	3	21	3
11	MF	(Singapore) Haiqal Pashia	12(7)	2	19	2
12	DF	(Singapore) Syahrul Sazali	21	1	21	1
14	MF	(Singapore) Rezza Rezky	6(4)	1	10	1
15	MF	(Singapore) Syed Firdaus Hassan	12(6)	1	18	1
16	DF	(Singapore) Akram Azman	1(3)	0	4	0
17	MF	(Singapore) Naqiuddin Eunos	14(4)	1	18	1
18	GK	(Singapore) Zharfan Rohaizad	11	0	11	0
19	FW	(Singapore) (South Africa) Ilhan Fandi	2(2)	2	4	2
20	MF	(Singapore) Nur Luqman	15	2	15	2
21	DF	(Singapore) Prakash Raj	2(1)	0	3	0
22	DF	(Singapore) Nur Adam Abdullah	1(4)	0	5	0
23	GK	(Singapore) Kenji Syed Rusydi	11	0	11	0
24	MF	(Singapore) (Nigeria) Rasaq Akeem	7(4)	1	11	1
26	DF	(Singapore) Lionel Tan	19(1)	0	20	0
27	MF	(Singapore) Sharul Nizam	13(2)	0	15	0
28	DF	(Singapore) Syed Akmal	7(2)	0	9	0
31	DF	(Singapore) Qayyum Raishyan	1(7)	0	8	0
32	MF	(Singapore) Gareth Low Jun Kit	4(2)	0	6	0
33	FW	(Singapore) Syahadat Masnawi	0(2)	0	2	0

Note 1: Lionel Tan scored an own goal in the SPL match against Tampines Rovers.

== Competitions ==
=== Overview ===
Competition	Record							
Competition	P	W	D	L	GF	GA	GD	Win %
Singapore Premier League	24	6	4	14	21	38	−17	25.00
Total	24	6	4	14	21	38	−17	25.00

=== Singapore Premier League ===
Win Draw Loss

2 March 2019 1	Young Lions FC (Singapore)	1–4	(Singapore) Balestier Khalsa	Jalan Besar Stadium
	Haiqal Pashia 32'		Sime Zuzul 10' 45'; Hazzuwan Halim 73'; Huzaifah Aziz 90'	Referee: Edwin Lee

31 March 2019 2	Young Lions FC (Singapore)	2–1	(Singapore) Hougang United	Jalan Besar Stadium
	Syukri Bashir 33'; Saifullah Akbar 70'; Zulqarnaen Suzliman (yellow card) 45'		Afiq Yunos 58'; Zulfahmi Arifin (yellow card) 64'; Gong Ho-won (red card) 72'	Referee: Farhan Mohamed

6 April 2019 3	Home United (Singapore)	2–1	(Singapore) Young Lions FC	Bishan Stadium
	Izzdin Shafiq 7'; Adam Swandi 40'		Joshua Pereira 8'	Referee: Jansen Foo

17 May 2019 4 (Rescheduled)	Warriors FC (Singapore)	2–0	(Singapore) Young Lions FC	Jurong East Stadium
	Gabriel Quak 55'; Jonathan Béhé 64'; Fairoz Hasan (yellow card) 48'			Referee: Abirami Naidu

14 April 2019 5	Young Lions FC (Singapore)	0–1	(Singapore) Geylang International	Jalan Besar Stadium
			Zikos Vasileios Chua 47'; Danish Irfan (yellow card) 36'; Amy Recha (yellow card) 60'	Referee: Farhan Mohamed

21 April 2019 6	Albirex Niigata (S) (Singapore)	2–1	(Singapore) Young Lions FC	Jurong East Stadium
	Naruki Takahashi 14'; Hiroyoshi Kamata 90+5'; Kengo Fukudome (yellow card) 30'; Kyoga Nakamura (yellow card) 88'		Haiqal Pashia 31' (pen.) (yellow card) 76'; Syed Akmal (yellow card) 82'; Syahrul Sazali (yellow card) 90+7'	Referee: Ahmad A'Qashah

24 April 2019 7	Brunei DPMM	0–0	(Singapore) Young Lions FC	Hassanal Bolkiah National Stadium
	Andrey Varankow (yellow card) 32'; Helmi Zambin (yellow card) 90+3'		Syed Akmal (yellow card) 39'; Nur Luqman (yellow card) 47'; Haiqal Pashia (yellow card) 62'; Jacob William Mahler (yellow card) 83'; Zulqarnaen Suzliman (yellow card) 85'	Referee: Farhan Mohamed

29 May 2019 8 (Rescheduled)	Tampines Rovers (Singapore)	4–0	(Singapore) Young Lions FC	Our Tampines Hub
	Lionel Tan 12' (o.g.); Taufik Suparno 33'; Zehrudin Mehmedović 89'; Jordan Webb 90+2' (yellow card) 68'; Akmal Azman (yellow card) 44'		Haiqal Pashia (yellow card) 70,78' (yellow-red card)	Referee: Muhammad Zulfiqar / Nazree Hussain; Man of the Match: Ryutaro Megumi (Japan)

3 May 2019 9	Balestier Khalsa (Singapore)	0–1	(Singapore) Young Lions FC	Bishan Stadium
	Sanjin Vrebac (yellow card) 1'; Raihan Rahman (yellow card) 3'; Sufianto Salleh (red card) 89'		Syukri Bashir 68'; Syed Akmal (yellow card) 83'	Referee: Lim Liang Yi

11 May 2019 10	Young Lions FC (Singapore)	0–2	(Singapore) Warriors FC	Jalan Besar Stadium
			Gabriel Quak 45'; Jonathan Béhé 81'	Referee: Jansen Foo

29 June 2019 11	Geylang International (Singapore)	1–2	(Singapore) Young Lions FC	Our Tampines Hub
	Zikos Vasileios Chua 82'; Firdaus Kasman (yellow card) 52'; Shawal Anuar (red card) 85'		Rezza Rezky 1'; Nur Luqman 59'; Zulqarnaen Suzliman (yellow card) 62'	Referee: Abirami Naidu

3 July 2019 12	Young Lions FC (Singapore)	0–1	(Singapore) Home United	Jalan Besar Stadium
	Irfan Najeeb (yellow card) 18'; Zulqarnaen Suzliman (yellow card) 68'		Abdil Qaiyyim Mutalib 11'; Hami Syahin (yellow card) 38'	Referee: Nathan Chan

6 July 2019 13	Young Lions FC (Singapore)	1–2	(Singapore) Albirex Niigata (S)	Jalan Besar Stadium
	Syahrul Sazali 56'; Joshua Pereira (yellow card) 17'; Haiqal Pashia (yellow card) 34' (yellow-red card) 90+4'; Abdul Rasaq Akeem (yellow card) 58'; Syahrul Sazali (red card) 89'		Kyoga Nakamura 19'; Yoshikatsu Hiraga 62'; Sota Sugiyama (yellow card) 55'	Referee: Syahir Ahmadi

10 July 2019 14	Hougang United (Singapore)	0–1	(Singapore) Young Lions FC	Jalan Besar Stadium
	Lionel Tan (yellow card) 26'; Hafiz Sujad (yellow card) 45'; Fabian Kwok (yellow card) 47'		Jacob Mahler 72'; Irfan Najeeb (yellow card) 51'; Zulqarnaen Suzliman (yellow card) 90'	Referee: Lim Liang Yi

13 July 2019 15	Young Lions FC (Singapore)	0–1	Brunei DPMM	Jalan Besar Stadium
	Zharfan Rohaizad (yellow card) 11'; Zulqarnaen Suzliman (yellow card) 15'		Abdul Azizi Ali Rahman 11' (yellow card) 11'	Referee: G. Letchman

18 July 2019 16 (Rescheduled)	Young Lions FC (Singapore)	1–1	(Singapore) Tampines Rovers	Jalan Besar Stadium
	Syed Firdaus Hassan 69'		Jordan Webb 23' (yellow card) 72'; Yasir Hanapi (yellow card) 63'	Referee: Juherman Zaiton

28 July 2019 17	Young Lions FC (Singapore)	1–0	(Singapore) Balestier Khalsa	Jalan Besar Stadium
	Nur Luqman 28'; Sharul Nizam (yellow card) 33'		Huzaifah Aziz (yellow card) 60'	Referee: Muhammad Zulfiqar

3 August 2019 18	Warriors FC (Singapore)	2–0	(Singapore) Young Lions FC	Jurong East Stadium
	Jonathan Béhé 61' 79'			Referee: Nathan Chan

18 August 2019 19	Young Lions FC (Singapore)	2–4	(Singapore) Hougang United	Jalan Besar Stadium
	Jacob Mahler 59', 89'		Fabian Kwok 7'; Nazrul Nazari 23'; Faris Ramli 74'; Mahathir Azeman 82'	Referee: Muhammad Zulfiqar

18 September 2019 20 (Rescheduled)	Home United (Singapore)	0–3	(Singapore) Young Lions FC	Bishan Stadium
			Zulqarnaen Suzliman 14'; Ilhan Fandi 20'; Saifullah Akbar 28' (pen.)	Referee: G.Letchman

31 August 2019 21	Young Lions FC (Singapore)	1–2	(Singapore) Geylang International	Jalan Besar Stadium
	Rasaq Akeem 90+1'		Fareez Farhan 45'; Barry Maguire 63'	Referee: Y.Sathyakumar

15 September 2019 22	Albirex Niigata (S) (Singapore)	4–1	(Singapore) Young Lions FC	Jurong East Stadium
	Kaishu Yamazaki 44' 53'; Shoki Ohara 57'; Daizo Horikoshi 77'		Ilhan Fandi 2'	Referee: Jansen Foo

7 August 2019 23 (Rescheduled)	Young Lions FC (Singapore)	1–1	Brunei DPMM	Jalan Besar Stadium
	Naqiuddin Eunos 85'		Charlie Clough 7'; Fakharrazi Hassan (yellow card) 42'; Yura Indera Putera Yunos (yellow card) 45' (yellow-red card) 71'	Referee: Lim Liang Yi

29 September 2019 24	Tampines Rovers (Singapore)	1–1	(Singapore) Young Lions FC	Our Tampines Hub
	Zehrudin Mehmedović 68'		Saifullah Akbar 85' (pen.)	Referee: Jansen Foo

Pos	Team	Pld	W	D	L	GF	GA	GD	Pts
5	Geylang International	24	10	3	11	41	48	−7	33
6	Home United	24	9	3	12	34	46	−12	30
7	Warriors	24	6	5	13	40	56	−16	23
8	Young Lions (Note: The two foreign clubs – Albirex Niigata (S) and DPMM – as well as the Football Association of Singapore (FAS) under-21 team, Young Lions, are ineligible for any AFC competition spots.)	24	6	4	14	21	38	−17	22
9	Balestier Khalsa	24	4	5	15	37	58	−21	17

Source: Singapore Premier League
Rules for classification: 1) points; 2) goal difference; 3) number of goals scored; 4) number of wins
