= 2019 Merlion Cup squads =

Below are the squads for the 2019 Merlion Cup, which took place between 7 and 9 June 2019.

== Teams ==
=== Singapore ===
No.	Pos.	Player	Date of birth (age)	Caps	Goals	Club
	GK	Zharfan Rohaizad	21 February 1997 (age 29)	2		(Football Association of Singapore) Garena Young Lions
	GK	Kenji Syed Rusydi	12 July 1998 (age 28)			(Football Association of Singapore) Garena Young Lions
	DF	Irfan Fandi (captain)	13 August 1997 (age 29)	2		(Football Association of Thailand) BG Pathum United
	DF	Irfan Najeeb	31 July 1999 (age 27)	1		(Football Association of Singapore) Garena Young Lions
	DF	Prakash Raj	11 June 1998 (age 28)			(Football Association of Singapore) Garena Young Lions
	DF	Syahrul Sazali	3 June 1998 (age 28)	2		(Football Association of Singapore) Garena Young Lions
	DF	Lionel Tan	5 June 1997 (age 29)	3	1	(Football Association of Singapore) Garena Young Lions
	DF	Zulqarnaen Suzliman	29 March 1998 (age 28)	1		(Football Association of Singapore) Garena Young Lions
	DF	Danish Irfan	10 March 1999 (age 27)			(Football Association of Singapore) Geylang International
	DF	Ryhan Stewart	15 February 2000 (age 26)	1		(Football Association of Singapore) Warriors FC
	MF	Daniel Goh	13 August 1999 (age 27)	1		(Football Association of Singapore) Balestier Khalsa
	MF	Hami Syahin	16 December 1998 (age 27)	2		(Football Association of Singapore) Home United
	MF	Jacob Mahler	20 April 2000 (age 26)	2		(Football Association of Singapore) Garena Young Lions
	MF	Joshua Pereira	10 October 1997 (age 28)	2		(Football Association of Singapore) Garena Young Lions
	MF	Nur Luqman	20 June 1998 (age 28)			(Football Association of Singapore) Garena Young Lions
	MF	Saifullah Akbar	31 January 1999 (age 27)			(Football Association of Singapore) Garena Young Lions
	MF	Rezza Rezky	8 November 2000 (age 25)	1		(Football Association of Singapore) Garena Young Lions
	MF	Amirul Haikal	11 October 1999 (age 26)			(Football Association of Singapore) SAFSA
	MF	Haiqal Pashia	29 November 1998 (age 27)	1	1	(Football Association of Singapore) Garena Young Lions
	FW	Zikos Vasileios Chua	15 April 2002 (age 24)			(Football Association of Singapore) Geylang International
	FW	Amiruldin Asraf	8 January 1997 (age 29)	2		(Football Association of Singapore) Home United
	FW	Ikhsan Fandi	9 April 1999 (age 27)	1		(Norwegian Football Federation) Raufoss IL

=== Indonesia ===
Head coach: (Indonesia) Indra Sjafri

No.	Pos.	Player	Date of birth (age)	Caps	Goals	Club
	GK	Satria Tama	23 January 1997 (aged 22)	9	0	(Football Association of Indonesia) Madura United
	GK	Nadeo Argawinata	9 March 1997 (aged 21)	1	0	(Football Association of Indonesia) Barito Putera
	DF	Andy Setyo	16 September 1997 (aged 21)	12	0	(Football Association of Indonesia) TIRA-Persikabo
	DF	Nurhidayat	5 April 1999 (aged 19)	7	0	(Football Association of Indonesia) Bhayangkara
	DF	Bagas Adi	8 March 1997 (aged 21)	10	0	(Football Association of Indonesia) Bhayangkara
	DF	Rachmat Irianto	3 September 1999 (aged 19)	7	1	(Football Association of Indonesia) Persebaya Surabaya
	DF	Asnawi Mangkualam	4 October 1999 (aged 19)	14	1	(Football Association of Indonesia) PSM Makassar
	DF	Samuel Christianson	31 July 1999 (aged 19)	2	0	(Football Association of Indonesia) Sriwijaya
	DF	Dandi Maulana	17 June 1998 (age 28)	1	0	(Football Association of Indonesia) Barito Putera
	DF	Muhammad Rifad Marasabessy	7 July 1999 (age 27)	1	0	(Football Association of Indonesia) Barito Putera
	DF	Rizky Dwi Febrianto	22 February 1997 (age 29)	2	1	(Football Association of Indonesia) Kalteng Putra
	MF	Luthfi Kamal	1 March 1999 (aged 19)	8	1	(Football Association of Indonesia) Mitra Kukar
	MF	Witan Sulaeman	8 October 2001 (aged 17)	10	2	(Football Association of Indonesia) PSIM Yogyakarta
	MF	Gian Zola	5 August 1998 (aged 20)	11	1	(Football Association of Indonesia) Persib Bandung
	MF	Hanif Sjahbandi	7 April 1997 (aged 21)	15	1	(Football Association of Indonesia) Arema Malang
	MF	Sani Rizki	7 January 1998 (aged 21)	7	1	(Football Association of Indonesia) Bhayangkara
	MF	Hambali Tolib	20 June 2000 (aged 18)	2	0	(Football Association of Indonesia) Persela Lamongan
	MF	Feby Eka Putra	12 February 1999 (aged 20)	2	0	(Football Association of Indonesia) Persija Jakarta
	MF	Yakob Sayuri	9 September 1997 (aged 21)	2	0	(Football Association of Indonesia) Barito Putera
	FW	Rafli Mursalim	5 March 1999 (aged 19)	2	0	(Football Association of Indonesia) Mitra Kukar
	FW	Septian Bagaskara	26 September 1997 (aged 21)	1	0	(Football Association of Indonesia) Persik Kediri
	FW	Muhammad Rafli	24 November 1998 (aged 20)	2	3	(Football Association of Indonesia) Arema Malang

=== Philippines ===
Head coach: (Philippines) Anto Gonzales

No.	Pos.	Player	Date of birth (age)	Club
	GK	Alexandre Arcilla		(Philippine Football Federation) Ateneo de Manila University
	GK	Michael Asong	3 October 1996 (aged 22)	(Philippine Football Federation) San Beda University
	DF	Miguel Clarino	1 February 1997 (aged 22)	(Philippine Football Federation) University of the Philippines
	DF	Dean Ebarle	20 April 1998 (aged 21)	(Philippine Football Federation) Kaya F.C.–Iloilo
	DF	Pete Forrosuelo		(Philippine Football Federation) Far Eastern University
	DF	Viejay Frigilliano		(Philippine Football Federation) Far Eastern University
	DF	William Grierson	27 April 1998 (aged 21)	(Philippine Football Federation) Ateneo de Manila University
	DF	Lorenzo Sabado Jr.		(Philippine Football Federation) San Beda University
	DF	John Renz Saldivar		(Philippine Football Federation) Far Eastern University
	DF	Ray Sanciangco		(Philippine Football Federation) University of the Philippines
	MF	Jeremiah Borlongan	8 December 1998 (aged 20)	(Philippine Football Federation) University of the Philippines
	MF	Joshua Broce		(Philippine Football Federation) National University
	MF	Dylan de Bruycker	5 December 1997 (aged 21)	(Philippine Football Federation) Ceres–Negros
	MF	Christian Lapas	10 November 1998 (aged 20)	(Philippine Football Federation) University of the Philippines
	MF	Kyle Magdato	10 July 1998 (aged 20)	(Philippine Football Federation) University of the Philippines
	MF	Jerome Marzan		(Philippine Football Federation) San Beda University
	MF	Daniel Saavedra		(Philippine Football Federation) University of the Philippines
	MF	Mariano Suba Jr.		(Philippine Football Federation) San Beda University
	FW	Javier Gayoso	11 February 1997 (aged 22)	(Philippine Football Federation) Ateneo de Manila University
	FW	Troy Limbo	17 November 1997 (aged 21)	(The Football Association) Sunderland RCA
	FW	Kintaro Miyagi	14 April 1998 (aged 21)	(Philippine Football Federation) University of the Philippines
	FW	Shanden Vergara		(Philippine Football Federation) De La Salle University

=== Thailand ===
Head coach: (Brazil) Alexandre Gama

No.	Pos.	Player	Date of birth (age)	Caps	Goals	Club
	GK	Nont Muangngam	20 April 1997 (age 29)			(Football Association of Thailand) Chiangmai
	GK	Korraphat Nareechan	7 October 1997 (age 28)			(Football Association of Thailand) Khon Kaen
	GK	Nopphon Lakhonphon	19 July 2000 (age 26)			(Football Association of Thailand) Lampang
	DF	Shinnaphat Leeaoh (captain)	2 February 1997 (age 29)			(Football Association of Thailand) Chiangrai United
	DF	Apisit Sorada	28 February 1997 (age 29)			(Football Association of Thailand) BG Pathum United
	DF	Sarayut Sompim	23 March 1997 (age 29)			(Football Association of Thailand) PTT Rayong
	DF	Saringkan Promsupa (vice-captain)	29 March 1997 (age 29)			(Football Association of Thailand) Muangthong United
	DF	Thitawee Aksornsri	8 November 1997 (age 28)			(Football Association of Thailand) Police Tero
	DF	Meechok Marhasaranukun	12 December 1997 (age 28)			(Football Association of Thailand) Suphanburi
	DF	Marco Ballini	12 June 1998 (age 28)			(Football Association of Thailand) Chainat Hornbill
	DF	Jaturapat Sattham	15 June 1999 (age 27)			(Football Association of Thailand) Chainat Hornbill
	MF	Kritsada Nontharat	1 February 2001 (age 25)			(Football Association of Thailand) Bangkok United
	MF	Siwakorn Sangwong	6 February 1997 (age 29)			(Football Association of Thailand) BG Pathum United
	MF	Jaroensak Wonggorn	18 May 1997 (age 29)			(Football Association of Thailand) Samut Prakan City
	MF	Kannarin Thawornsak	27 May 1997 (age 29)			(Football Association of Thailand) Sisaket
	MF	Wisarut Imura	18 October 1997 (age 28)			(Football Association of Thailand) Bangkok United
	MF	Rattanakorn Maikami	1 January 1998 (age 28)			(Football Association of Thailand) Buriram United
	MF	Ekanit Panya	21 October 1999 (age 26)			(Football Association of Thailand) Chiangmai
	MF	Chatmongkol Thongkiri	5 May 1997 (age 29)			(Football Association of Thailand) Chainat Hornbill
	FW	Sittichok Paso	28 January 1999 (age 27)			(Football Association of Thailand) Chonburi
	FW	Korrawit Tasa	7 April 2000 (age 26)			(Football Association of Thailand) Muangthong United
	FW	Nattawut Munsuwan	24 May 1998 (age 28)			(Football Association of Thailand) Police Tero
