= 2021 Lion City Sailors FC season =

Lion City Sailors
2021 season
- Owner: Sea Limited
- Chairman: Forrest Li
- Head coach: Kim Do-hoon
- Stadium: Bishan Stadium; Jalan Besar Stadium (Temporary)
- Top goalscorer: Stipe Plazibat (Croatia); 7 Goals (As of 12 April)
Home colours	Away colours

The 2021 season was Lion City Sailors' 26th consecutive season in the Singapore Premier League and the second season since privatising from Home United.

== Squad ==
=== Singapore Premier League ===
As of 5 January 2021

Squad No.	Name	Nationality	Date of birth (age)	Previous club	Contract since	Contract end
Goalkeepers
13	Adib Hakim ^{U23}	(Singapore)	9 March 1998 (age 28)	(Singapore) Young Lions FC	2020	2021
18	Hassan Sunny ^{>30}	(Singapore)	2 April 1984 (age 42)	(Thailand) Army United F.C.	2020	2021
24	Rudy Khairullah	(Singapore)	19 July 1994 (age 32)	(Singapore) Police SA (NFL D1)	2017	2021
Defenders
3	Tajeli Salamat	(Singapore)	7 February 1994 (age 32)	(Singapore) Warriors FC	2020	2021
4	Jorge Fellipe	(Brazil)	27 October 1988 (age 38)	(Saudi Arabia) Al-Tai FC	2021	2021
5	Amirul Adli	(Singapore)	13 January 1996 (age 30)	(Singapore) Tampines Rovers	2021	2021
7	Aqhari Abdullah	(Singapore)	9 July 1991 (age 35)	(Singapore) LionsXII	2016	2021
19	Naqiuddin Eunos	(Singapore)	1 December 1997 (age 28)	(Singapore) Young Lions FC	2020	2021
20	Nur Adam Abdullah ^{U23}	(Singapore)	13 April 2001 (age 25)	(Singapore) Young Lions FC	2021	2021
Midfielders
8	Shahdan Sulaiman (Captain) ^{>30}	(Singapore)	9 May 1988 (age 38)	(Singapore) Tampines Rovers	2020	2021
10	Diego Lopes	(Brazil)	3 May 1994 (age 32)	(Portugal) Rio Ave F.C.	2021	2023
11	Hafiz Nor ^{>30}	(Singapore)	22 August 1988 (age 38)	(Singapore) Warriors FC	2018	2021
14	Song Ui-young	(Singapore) (South Korea)	8 November 1993 (age 33)	Youth Team	2012	2021
15	Hariss Harun ^{>30}	(Singapore)	9 November 1990 (age 36)	(Malaysia) Johor Darul Ta'zim F.C.	2021	2024
17	Saifullah Akbar ^{U23}	(Singapore)	31 January 1999 (age 27)	(Singapore) Young Lions FC	2020	2021
22	Gabriel Quak ^{>30}	(Singapore)	22 December 1990 (age 35)	(Singapore) Warriors FC	2020	2021
26	Aizal Murhamdani ^{U23}	(Singapore)	26 March 2001 (age 25)	(Singapore) LCS Academy	2017	2021
27	Adam Swandi	(Singapore)	12 January 1996 (age 30)	(Singapore) Albirex Niigata (S)	2019	2021
Strikers
9	Stipe Plazibat	(Croatia)	31 August 1989 (age 37)	(Singapore) Hougang United	2020	2021
23	Amiruldin Asraf	(Singapore)	8 January 1997 (age 29)	Youth Team	2017	2022
25	Haiqal Pashia ^{U23}	(Singapore)	29 November 1998 (age 27)	(Singapore) Young Lions FC	2021	2021
30	Faris Ramli	(Singapore)	24 August 1992 (age 34)	(Malaysia) Terengganu F.C. I	2021	2021
Players on NS / who left during the season
2	Ho Wai Loon	(Singapore)	20 August 1993 (age 33)	(Singapore) Warriors FC	2019	2021
12	Iqram Rifqi	(Singapore)	25 February 1996 (age 30)	Youth Team	2017	2021
	Zulqarnaen Suzliman ^{U23}	(Singapore)	29 March 1998 (age 28)	(Singapore) Young Lions FC	2020	2022
	Faizal Roslan	(Singapore)	30 May 1995 (age 31)	(Singapore) Young Lions FC	2018	2021
	Hami Syahin ^{U23}	(Singapore)	16 December 1998 (age 27)	(Singapore) Young Lions FC	2019	2021
	Arshad Shamim ^{U23}	(Singapore)	9 December 1999 (age 26)	(Singapore) LCS Academy	2018	2021
37	Anaqi Ismit ^{U21}	(Singapore)	24 August 2001 (age 25)	(Singapore) LCS Academy	2019	2020
47	Bill Mamadou ^{U21}	(Singapore) (Mali)	8 September 2001 (age 25)	(Singapore) NFA U17	2021	2021
52	Putra Anugerah ^{U21}	(Singapore) (Indonesia)	2 April 2000 (age 26)	(Singapore) LCS Academy	2019	2019
	Kimura Riki ^{U21}	(Singapore) (Japan)	14 November 2000 (age 26)	(Singapore) LCS Academy	2021	2021
6	Abdil Qaiyyim Mutalib ^{>30}	(Singapore)	14 May 1989 (age 37)	(Singapore) Tampines Rovers	2015	2021
16	Justin Hui ^{U23}	(Singapore)	17 February 1998 (age 28)	(Singapore) Hougang United	2021	2021

== Coaching staff ==
Source
Position	Name	Ref.
Chairman	(Singapore) (China) Forrest Li	
CEO	(Singapore) Chew Chun Liang	
General Manager	(Singapore) Badri Ghent	
Team Manager	(Singapore) Richard Chitrakar	
Head Coach	(South Korea) Kim Do-hoon	2.5 years contract till 2023
Assistant Coach	(South Korea) Myung Jae Yong (Singapore) Noh Rahman	
Goalkeeping Coach	(Singapore) Chua Lye Heng	
Head of Youth	(Singapore) Robin Chitrakar	
Under-21 Coach	(Singapore) Winston Yap	
Under-21 Goalkeeper Coach	(Singapore) Yeo Jun Guang	
Academy Director	(Serbia) Luka Lalić	
Academy Coach	(Singapore) Shahril Jantan (Serbia) Miloš Đorđević (Portugal) Rodrigo Costa (Spain) Rafael Palacios	
Video Analyst	(South Korea) Kim Young Kwang (Singapore) Adi Saleh	
Sports Trainer	(Singapore) Daniel Feriza (Singapore) Fazly Hasan	
Head of Performance (Academy)	(Netherlands) Mark Onderwater	
Sports Performance Coach	(Singapore) Shazaly Ayob (Singapore) Nasruldin Baharuddin	
1st Team Head of Performance	(Croatia) Mario Jovanovic	
Head Physiotherapist	(Singapore) Nurhafizah Abu Sujad	
Senior Physiologist	(Malaysia) Firdaus Maasar	
Sports Therapist	(Singapore) Fathul Nur Hakim	
Logistics Officer	(Singapore) Zahir Taufeek	
Kitman		

== Transfer ==
=== In ===
Pre-season

Position	Player	Transferred from	Ref
GK	(Singapore) (Hong Kong) (India) Veer Karan Sobti	(Singapore) Young Lions FC	Free
DF	(Singapore) Nur Adam Abdullah	(Singapore) Young Lions FC	Free
DF	(Singapore) Amirul Adli	(Singapore) Tampines Rovers	Free
DF	(Brazil) Jorge Fellipe	(Saudi Arabia) Al-Tai FC	Undisclosed; 1-year contract signed in 2021
MF	(Brazil) Diego Lopes	(Portugal) Rio Ave F.C.	S$2,900,000; 3 years contract signed in 2021
MF	(Singapore) Haziq Mikhail	(Singapore) Tampines Rovers U19	Free
MF	(Singapore) Justin Hui	(Singapore) Hougang United	Free
FW	(Singapore) Faris Ramli	(Malaysia) Terengganu F.C. I	Free; 1-year contract signed in 2021

Mid-season

Position	Player	Transferred From	Ref
MF	(Singapore) Hariss Harun	(Malaysia) Johor Darul Ta'zim F.C.	Undisclosed; 3.5 years contract signed in 2021

=== Out ===
Preseason

Position	Player	Transferred To	Ref
DF	(Japan) Kaishu Yamazaki	(Singapore) Hougang United	Free
MF	(Singapore) Izzdin Shafiq	(Singapore) Geylang International	Free
FW	(Singapore) Shahril Ishak	(Singapore) Hougang United	Free
MF	(Singapore) Naufal Ilham	(Singapore) Tanjong Pagar United	Free

Mid Season

Position	Player	Transferred To	Ref
DF	(Singapore) Abdil Qaiyyim Mutalib	(Singapore) Geylang International	Undisclosed

=== Loan Return ===
Preseason

Position	Player	Transferred from	Ref
GK	(Singapore) (Indonesia) Putra Anugerah	(Singapore) Young Lions FC	Loan Return
MF	(Singapore) (Mali) Bill Mamadou	(Singapore) Young Lions FC	Loan Return

Note 1: Bill Mamadou & Putra Anugerah returned before extending their loan with GYL.

=== Loan Out ===
Preseason

Position	Player	Transferred To	Ref
DF	(Singapore) Zulqarnaen Suzliman	(Singapore) Police SA	NS till 2022
MF	(Singapore) Hami Syahin	(Singapore) Police SA	NS till 2022
MF	(Singapore) Arshad Shamim	(Singapore)	NS till 2022
DF	(Singapore) Faizal Roslan	(Singapore) Geylang International	Season loan
MF	(Singapore) Iqram Rifqi	(Singapore) Geylang International	Season loan
GK	(Singapore) (Indonesia) Putra Anugerah	(Singapore) Young Lions FC	Season loan
MF	(Singapore) (Mali) Bill Mamadou	(Singapore) Young Lions FC	Season loan
FW	(Singapore) Anaqi Ismit	(Singapore) Tanjong Pagar United	Season loan
GK	(Singapore) Kimura Riki	(Singapore) Balestier Khalsa	Season loan

Note 1: Zulqarnaen Suzliman and Hami Syahin were subsequently loaned to Young Lions FC.

Mid Season

Position	Player	Transferred To	Ref
DF	(Singapore) Ho Wai Loon	(Singapore) Lion City Sailors	Season loan
MF	(Singapore) Justin Hui	(Singapore)	NS till 2023

=== Extension / Retained ===
Position	Player	Ref
GK	(Singapore) Hassan Sunny	2 years contract signed in 2019
GK	(Singapore) Rudy Khairullah	
GK	(Singapore) Adib Hakim	
DF	(Singapore) Ho Wai Loon	
DF	(Singapore) Naqiuddin Eunos	
DF	(Singapore) Tajeli Salamat	
DF	(Singapore) Abdil Qaiyyim	
DF	(Singapore) Aqhari Abdullah	
MF	(Singapore) Arshad Shamim	
MF	(Singapore) Saifullah Akbar	
MF	(Singapore) Adam Swandi	2 years contract signed in 2019
MF	(Singapore) Gabriel Quak	2 years contract signed in 2019
MF	(Singapore) Shahdan Sulaiman	2 years contract signed in 2019
MF	(Singapore) Hafiz Nor	
MF	(South Korea) (Singapore) Song Ui-young	
FW	(Singapore) Haiqal Pashia	
FW	(Croatia) Stipe Plazibat	2 years contract signed in 2020
FW	(Singapore) Amiruldin Asraf	2 years contract signed in 2020

=== Promoted ===
Position	Player	Ref
MF	(Singapore) Aizal Murhamdani	

=== Contract offer ===
Position	Player	From	Ref
DF	(Australia) Harrison Delbridge	(Australia) Melbourne City FC	
DF	(Australia) Miloš Degenek	(Serbia) Red Star Belgrade	

Note 1: Harrison Delbridge was offered a contract by LCS but choose to sign for (South Korea) Incheon United.

Note 2: (Serbia) Red Star Belgrade accepted the Euro1.7m offer but Miloš Degenek rejected the move and choose to stay on.

== Friendlies ==
=== Pre-season friendlies ===
Win Draw Loss

6 March 2021 1	Young Lions FC (Singapore)	1–3	(Singapore) Lion City Sailors	Jalan Besar Stadium
	Danish Qayyum			Attendance: 0 (Note: Due to the COVID-19 pandemic, this match was played behind closed doors.)

=== In-season friendlies ===
Win Draw Loss

30 April 2021 1	Lion City Sailors (Singapore)	4–0	(Singapore) Balestier Khalsa	Jalan Besar Stadium
	Amiruldin Asraf; Faris Ramli (pen.)			Attendance: 0

11 June 2021 2	Lion City Sailors (Singapore)	2–4	Singapore U-22	Jalan Besar Stadium
	Jacob Mahler 36' (o.g.); Song Ui-young 90+4'		Khairin Nadim 47' 75'; Jacob Mahler 53'; Zamani Zamri 90+2'	Attendance: 0 (Note: Due to the COVID-19 pandemic, this match was played behind closed doors.)

25 June 2021 3	Lion City Sailors (Singapore)	4–2	(Singapore) Balestier Khalsa	Jalan Besar Stadium
	Stipe Plazibat; Song Ui-young; Hariss Harun		Shuhei Hoshino; Gareth Low	Attendance: 0

3 July 2021 4	Lion City Sailors (Singapore)	v	(Japan) Albirex Niigata (S)	Jalan Besar Stadium
				Attendance: 0

10 July 2021 5	Lion City Sailors (Singapore)	v	(Singapore) Tanjong Pagar United	Jalan Besar Stadium
				Attendance: 0

16 July 2021 6	Lion City Sailors (Singapore)	3–0	(Singapore) Geylang International	Jalan Besar Stadium
	Diego Lopes			Attendance: 0 Referee: Nathan Chan

== Team statistics ==
=== Appearances and goals ===
As of 21 Sept 2021

No.	Pos.	Player	Sleague		AFC Cup		Total	
No.	Pos.	Player	Apps.	Goals	Apps.	Goals	Apps.	Goals
3	DF	(Singapore) Tajeli Salamat	11+2	0	0	0	13	0
4	DF	(Brazil) Jorge Fellipe	14+1	5	0	0	15	5
5	DF	(Singapore) Amirul Adli	15+1	0	0	0	16	0
7	DF	(Singapore) Aqhari Abdullah	5+4	0	0	0	9	0
8	MF	(Singapore) Shahdan Sulaiman	20	2	0	0	20	2
9	FW	(Croatia) Stipe Plazibat	17	14	0	0	17	14
10	MF	(Brazil) Diego Lopes	10+8	6	0	0	18	6
11	MF	(Singapore) Hafiz Nor	1+9	1	0	0	10	1
14	MF	(South Korea) (Singapore) Song Ui-young	8+7	7	0	0	15	7
15	MF	(Singapore) Hariss Harun	9+1	0	0	0	10	0
17	MF	(Singapore) Saifullah Akbar	20	4	0	0	20	4
18	GK	(Singapore) Hassan Sunny	20	0	0	0	20	0
19	DF	(Singapore) Naqiuddin Eunos	10	0	0	0	10	0
20	DF	(Singapore) Nur Adam Abdullah	16	0	0	0	16	0
22	MF	(Singapore) Gabriel Quak	17+4	13	0	0	21	13
24	GK	(Singapore) Rudy Khairullah	1+1	0	0	0	2	0
25	FW	(Singapore) Haiqal Pashia	15	3	0	0	15	3
27	MF	(Singapore) Adam Swandi	1+11	0	0	0	12	0
30	FW	(Singapore) Faris Ramli	9+11	3	0	0	20	3
41	DF	(Singapore) Aniq Raushan	5	0	0	0	5	0
45	MF	(Singapore) Glenn Ong	3	0	0	0	3	0
Players who have played this season but had left the club or on loan to other club
2	DF	(Singapore) Ho Wai Loon	0	0	0	0	0	0
6	DF	(Singapore) Abdil Qaiyyim Mutalib	0	0	0	0	0	0
16	MF	(Singapore) Justin Hui	4	0	0	0	4	0

== Competitions ==
=== Overview ===
Competition	Record							
Competition	P	W	D	L	GF	GA	GD	Win %
Singapore Premier League	21	14	6	1	59	21	+38	66.67
Total	21	14	6	1	59	21	+38	66.67

=== Singapore Premier League ===
Win Draw Loss

13 March 2021 1	Lion City Sailors (Singapore)	3–3	(Singapore) Tampines Rovers	Jalan Besar Stadium
	Song Ui-young 4'; Gabriel Quak 5' 58' (yellow card) 40'; Saifullah Akbar (yellow card) 77'; Stipe Plazibat (yellow card) 86'	Report	Madhu Mohana 19'; Yasir Hanapi 63' 67'; Shah Shahiran (yellow card) 42'; Taufik Suparno (yellow card) 75'	Attendance: 0 Referee: Jansen Foo

17 March 2021 2	Tanjong Pagar United (Singapore)	0–5	(Singapore) Lion City Sailors	Jurong East Stadium
		Report	Stipe Plazibat 47' (pen.) 59'; Song Ui-young 54' 70' (yellow card) 21'; Faris Ramli 84' (pen.)	Attendance: 0 Referee: Zulfiqar Mustaffa

20 March 2021 3	Lion City Sailors (Singapore)	1–3	(Singapore) Hougang United	Jalan Besar Stadium
	Stipe Plazibat 85'; Nur Adam Abdullah (yellow card) 65'	Report	Lionel Tan 19'; Tomoyuki Doi 20' 59'; Mukundan Maran (yellow card) 69'	Attendance: 0 Referee: Juherman Zaiton

3 April 2021 4	Young Lions FC (Singapore)	1–3	(Singapore) Lion City Sailors	Jalan Besar Stadium
	Ilhan Fandi 78'; Hami Syahin (yellow card) 45+2'	Report	Gabriel Quak 26' 62'; Stipe Plazibat 34'; Jorge Fellipe (yellow card) 17'; Amirul Adli (yellow card) 45+1' (yellow-red card) 75'; Nur Adam Abdullah (yellow card) 60'	Attendance: 0 Referee: Y.Sathyakumar

7 April 2021 5	Lion City Sailors (Singapore)	2–2	(Japan) Albirex Niigata (S)	Jalan Besar Stadium
	Stipe Plazibat 45' (penalty missed) 85; Jorge Fellipe 87'; Shahdan Sulaiman (yellow card) 55'; Aqhari Abdullah (yellow card) 80'; Saifullah Akbar (yellow card) 90'	Report	Ryoya Tanigushi 17' (yellow card) 84'; Shuya Yamashita 42' (yellow card) 80'	Attendance: 0 Referee: Ahmad A'qashah

11 April 2021 6	Geylang International (Singapore)	0–8	(Singapore) Lion City Sailors	Our Tampines Hub
	Darren Teh (yellow card) 41'; Yuki Ichikawa (yellow card) 49'; Fareez Farhan (yellow card) 50'	Report	Gabriel Quak 7' 60'; Diego Lopes 18' 37' 90+2'; Saifullah Akbar 30'; Stipe Plazibat 67' 77'	Attendance: 250; Referee: Lim Liang Yi

18 April 2021 7	Lion City Sailors (Singapore)	4–1	(Singapore) Balestier Khalsa	Jalan Besar Stadium
	Gabriel Quak 7'; Shahdan Sulaiman 18' (yellow card) 63'; Stipe Plazibat 47'; Saifullah Akbar 51'	Report	Kristijan Krajcek 25'; Hazzuwan Halim (yellow card) 75'	Attendance: 250; Referee: Muhd Syarqawi

9 May 2021 8	Lion City Sailors (Singapore)	2–1	(Singapore) Geylang International	Jalan Besar Stadium
	Stipe Plazibat 21'; Saifullah Akbar 57'; Jorge Fellipe (yellow card) 30'; Shahdan Sulaiman (yellow card) 90+2'	Report	Matheus Moresche 27'; Ilhan Noor (yellow card) 3'; Firdaus Kasman (yellow card) 12'; Christopher van Huizen (yellow card) 71'; Barry Maguire (yellow card) 82'	Attendance: 0 Referee: Juherman Zaiton

16 May 2021 9	Lion City Sailors (Singapore)	3–1	(Singapore) Tanjong Pagar United	Jalan Besar Stadium
	Jorge Fellipe 55'; Gabriel Quak 59'; Diego Lopes 80'; Saifullah Akbar (yellow card) 31'; Amirul Adli (yellow card) 84'	Report	Shodai Nishikawa 47'; Daniel Martens (yellow card) 37'; Suhairi Sabri (yellow card) 67'	Attendance: 0 Referee: Abirami Naidu

24 April 2021 10 (Rescheduled)	Hougang United (Singapore)	0–1	(Singapore) Lion City Sailors	Hougang Stadium
	Farhan Zulkifli (yellow card) 7'; Idraki Adnan (yellow card) 47'; Anders Aplin (yellow card) 79'	Report	Diego Lopes 69'; Jorge Fellipe (yellow card) 90+3'	Attendance: 250; Referee: Farhad Mohamed

22 May 2021 11	Lion City Sailors (Singapore)	1–0	(Singapore) Young Lions FC	Jalan Besar Stadium
	Shahdan Sulaiman 43' (yellow card) 54'; Aniq Raushan (yellow card) 68'; Saifullah Akbar (yellow card) 78'; Song Ui-young (red card) 84'; Stipe Plazibat (yellow card) 85'	Report	Hami Syahin (yellow card) 34'; Syahrul Sazali (red card) 42'; Khairin Nadim (yellow card) 87'	Attendance: 0 Referee: Syarqawi Buhari

23 July 2021 12 (Rescheduled)	Albirex Niigata (S) (Japan)	1–1	(Singapore) Lion City Sailors	Jurong East Stadium
	Ryoya Tanigushi 45' (pen.); Reo Kunimoto (yellow card) 70'	Report	Stipe Plazibat 72'	Attendance: 100; Referee: Nathan Chan

21 September 2021 13 (Rescheduled)	Tampines Rovers (Singapore)	1–6	(Singapore) Lion City Sailors	Our Tampines Hub
	Hariss Harun 51' (o.g.); Iman Hakim (yellow card) 27'; Andrew Aw (yellow card) 75'	Report	Haiqal Pashia 37'; Gabriel Quak 56'; Song Ui-young 67' 79'; Faris Ramli 74'; Daniel Bennett 76' (o.g.); Tajeli Salamat (yellow card) 61'	Attendance: 1000; Referee: Farhad Mohamed

8 August 2021 14 (Rescheduled)	Balestier Khalsa (Singapore)	1–1	(Singapore) Lion City Sailors	Toa Payoh Stadium
	Šime Žužul 60'; Shuhei Hoshino (yellow card) 56'; Ensar Brunčević (yellow card) 90+1' (yellow-red card) 90+3'; Zaiful Nizam (yellow card) 90+2'	Report	Stipe Plazibat 90+4'; Faris Ramli (yellow card) 53'; Saifullah Akbar (yellow card) 58'; Jorge Fellipe (yellow card) 90'	Attendance: 100; Referee: Ahmad A'qashah

15 August 2021 15 (Rescheduled)	Lion City Sailors (Singapore)	4–1	(Singapore) Tampines Rovers	Jalan Besar Stadium
	Gabriel Quak 34'; Stipe Plazibat 36' 48'; Saifullah Akbar 46'; Song Ui-young (yellow card) 85'	Report	Boris Kopitović 59'; Baihakki Khaizan (yellow card) 40'; Yasir Hanapi (yellow card) 70'; Zehrudin Mehmedović (yellow card) 82'	Attendance: 500; Referee: Farhad Mohamed

20 August 2021 16 (Rescheduled)	Tanjong Pagar United (Singapore)	1–2	(Singapore) Lion City Sailors	Jurong East Stadium
	Luiz Júnior 77'; Rusyaidi Salime (yellow card) 52'; Shakir Hamzah (yellow card) 57'; Ammirul Emmran (yellow card) 90+2'	Report	Haiqal Pashia 42'; Jorge Fellipe 53'; Faris Ramli (yellow card) 70'; Hassan Sunny (yellow card) 82'	Attendance: 1000; Referee: Ahmad A'qashah

27 August 2021 17 (Rescheduled)	Lion City Sailors (Singapore)	1–1	(Singapore) Hougang United	Jalan Besar Stadium
	Stipe Plazibat 75'; Hafiz Nor (yellow card) 78'; Diego Lopes (yellow card) 90+2'	Report	Anders Aplin 50'; Farhan Zulkifli (yellow card) 35'; Hafiz Sujad (yellow card) 75'	Attendance: 1000; Referee: Taufik Thana

12 September 2021 18 (Rescheduled)	Young Lions FC (Singapore)	1–3	(Singapore) Lion City Sailors	Jalan Besar Stadium
	Ilhan Fandi 17'; Zulqarnaen Suzliman (yellow card) 42'; Raoul Suhaimi (yellow card) 58' (yellow-red card) 68'; Harhys Stewart (yellow card) 73'; Syahrul Sazali (yellow card) 80'; Jordan Emaviwe (yellow card) 90+1'; Philippe Aw (red card) 90+2'	Report	Jorge Fellipe 50' 85' (yellow card) 85'; Gabriel Quak 90+1'; Saifullah Akbar (yellow card) 47'; Faris Ramli (yellow card) 90+4'	Attendance: 1000; Referee: Nathan Chan

17 September 2021 19 (Rescheduled)	Lion City Sailors (Singapore)	1–1	(Japan) Albirex Niigata (S)	Jalan Besar Stadium
	Haiqal Pashia 25'	Report	Ryoya Tanigushi 90+4'; Kiyoshiro Tsuboi (yellow card) 61'	Attendance: 1000; Referee: Zulfiqar Mustaffa

26 September 2021 20 (Rescheduled)	Geylang International (Singapore)	0–3	(Singapore) Lion City Sailors	Our Tampines Hub
	Matheus Moresche (yellow card) 56'	Report	Faris Ramli 32'; Song Ui-young 39' (yellow card) 52'; Hafiz Nor 87'	Referee: Jansen Foo

10 October 2021 21 (Rescheduled)	Lion City Sailors (Singapore)	4–1	(Singapore) Balestier Khalsa	Jalan Besar Stadium
	Song Ui-young 8'; Gabriel Quak 42' 82'; Diego Lopes 78'; Nur Adam Abdullah (yellow card) 71'; Adam Swandi (yellow card) 79' (yellow-red card) 87'	Report	Aidil Johari 31'; Hazzuwan Halim (yellow card) 44'; Ensar Brunčević (yellow card) 47'; Hariysh Krishnakumar (yellow card) 89'	Referee: Juherman Zaiton

Pos	Team	Pld	W	D	L	GF	GA	GD	Pts	Qualification or relegation
1	Lion City Sailors	21	14	6	1	59	21	+38	48	Qualification for AFC Champions League group stage
2	Albirex Niigata (S) (Note: The foreign club – Albirex Niigata (S) – as well as the Football Association of Singapore (FAS) under-21 team, Young Lions, are ineligible for any AFC competition spots.)	21	13	7	1	50	19	+31	46	
3	Hougang United	21	10	4	7	48	40	+8	34	Qualification for AFC Cup group stage
4	Tampines Rovers	21	7	6	8	48	51	−3	27	Qualification for AFC Cup group stage
5	Tanjong Pagar United	21	5	7	9	36	49	−13	22	

Updated to match(es) played on 3 April 2021. Source: Singapore Premier League
Rules for classification: 1) points; 2) goal difference; 3) number of goals scored; 4) number of wins
