= Ridhwan Fikri =

Singaporean footballer

Personal information
- Full name: Ridhwan Fikri bin Aban
- Date of birth: 29 April 1999 (age 27)
- Place of birth: Singapore
- Height: 1.83 m (6 ft 0 in)
- Position: Goalkeeper

Team information
- Current team: Lion City Sailors
- Number: 1

Senior career*
Years	Team	Apps	(Gls)
2020–2022	Young Lions	25	(0)
2023–2024	Geylang International	1	(0)
2024–	Lion City Sailors		

International career^{‡}
2021–	Singapore U23	5	(0)
- * Club domestic league appearances and goals as of 5 Feb 2021 ‡ National team caps and goals as of 5 Feb 2021

Ridhwan Fikri bin Aban (born 29 April 1999) is a Singaporean footballer who plays as a goalkeeper for Singapore Premier League side Lion City Sailors.

== Club ==
He signed for the Young Lions in 2018 before joining GFA FC for 2019. He went on to be promoted to the senior squad before making 20 appearances in the 2018 season.

== Career statistics ==
=== Club ===
As of 10 Oct 2021

Club	Season	League			Cup		Continental		Other		Total	
Club	Season	Division	Apps	Goals	Apps	Goals	Apps	Goals	Apps	Goals	Apps	Goals
Young Lions FC	2018	Singapore Premier League	0	0	0	0	0	0	0	0	0	0
Young Lions FC	2020	Singapore Premier League	6	0	0	0	0	0	0	0	6	0
Young Lions FC	2021	Singapore Premier League	12	0	0	0	0	0	0	0	12	0
Young Lions FC	2022	Singapore Premier League	22	0	3	0	0	0	0	0	25	0
Young Lions FC	Total		40	0	3	0	0	0	0	0	43	0
Geylang International	2023	Singapore Premier League	0	0	0	0	0	0	0	0	0	0
Geylang International	Total		0	0	0	0	0	0	0	0	0	0
Career total			40	0	0	0	0	0	0	0	43	0
