= Rezza Rezky =

Singaporean footballer (born 2000)

Personal information
- Full name: Rezza Rezky Ramadhani bin Yacobjan
- Date of birth: 8 November 2000 (age 26)
- Place of birth: Singapore
- Height: 1.73 m (5 ft 8 in)
- Position: Midfielder

Team information
- Current team: Tanjong Pagar United on loan Tampines Rovers
- Number: 8

Youth career
- National Football Academy

Senior career*
Years	Team	Apps	(Gls)
2019–2022	Young Lions	26	(1)
2022–	Tampines Rovers	18	(0)
2024–	→ Tanjong Pagar United (loan)	28	(1)

International career
2015-2016	Singapore U16	9	(4)
2017–2018	Singapore U19	8	(0)
2019–	Singapore U22	2	(0)
Medal record
Men's football
Representing Singapore
Merlion Cup
Winner	2019 Singapore
- * Club domestic league appearances and goals as of 16:09, 15 September 2018 (UTC)

Rezza Rezky Ramadhani bin Yacobjan (born 8 November 2000) is a Singaporean professional footballer who plays for Singapore Premier League club Tanjong Pagar United on loan from Tampines Rovers.

Rezza was 1st nominated for the 2017 Dollah Salleh award but failed to win it. In 2018, he was nominated again for the award but this time round lost to Nur Adam Abdullah.

== Club career ==
=== Young Lions ===
In January 2019, Rezza was promoted from the National Football Academy and signed with Singapore Premier League club Young Lions. He make his professional debut on 31 March 2019 coming on as a substitution in a 3–1 win over Hougang United. On 26 June, Rezza would then scored his first professional goal against Geylang International in a 2–1 win where he scored a header in the 1st minute of the match.

=== Tampines Rovers ===
On 11 October 2022, Rezza joined Tampines Rovers. He make his debut for the club coming on as a substitution against Tanjong Pagar United on 20 October.

==== Loan to Tanjong Pagar United ====
On 23 February 2024, Rezza was loaned to Tanjong Pagar United.

== International career ==
Rezza was invited for the national team training on 3 and 10 March 2020. This was his first involvement with the senior side.

== Personal life ==
Rezza brother, Haiqal Pashia is also a professional footballer currently playing in the Singapore Premier League for Lion City Sailors. Both were called up for the 2019 Merlion Cup.

== Career statistics ==
=== Club ===
As of 25 May 2025

Club	Season	League			Cup		Continental		Other		Total	
Club	Season	Division	Apps	Goals	Apps	Goals	Apps	Goals	Apps	Goals	Apps	Goals
Young Lions	2019	Singapore Premier League	10	1	0	0	0	0	0	0	10	1
Young Lions	2020	Singapore Premier League	2	0	0	0	0	0	0	0	2	0
Young Lions	2021	Singapore Premier League	9	0	0	0	0	0	0	0	9	0
Young Lions	2022	Singapore Premier League	5	0	0	0	0	0	0	0	5	0
Young Lions	Total		26	1	0	0	0	0	0	0	26	1
Tampines Rovers	2022	Singapore Premier League	1	0	3	0	0	0	0	0	4	0
Tampines Rovers	2023	Singapore Premier League	10	0	4	0	0	0	0	0	14	0
Tampines Rovers	Total		11	0	7	0	0	0	0	0	18	0
Tanjong Pagar United (loan)	2024–25	Singapore Premier League	25	1	3	0	0	0	0	0	28	1
Tanjong Pagar United (loan)	Total		25	1	3	0	0	0	0	0	28	1
Career total			62	2	10	0	0	0	0	0	72	2

== Honours ==
=== International ===
Singapore U22

- Merlion Cup: 2019
