= Akram bin Azman =

Singaporean footballer

Akram Azman
Personal information
- Full name: Akram bin Azman
- Date of birth: 21 November 2000 (age 25)
- Place of birth: Singapore
- Height: 1.73 m (5 ft 8 in)
- Position: Defender

Team information
- Current team: Lion City Sailors
- Number: 30

Youth career
- NFA

Senior career*
Years	Team	Apps	(Gls)
2021	Young Lions FC	0	(0)
2022–20224	Tanjong Pagar United	52	(4)
2025–	Lion City Sailors	3	(0)

International career^{‡}
2025–	Singapore	3	(0)
- * Club domestic league appearances and goals as of 00:54, 15 Mar 2025 (UTC) ‡ National team caps and goals as of 11:00, 20 Jul 2026 (UTC)

Akram bin Azman (born 21 November 2000) is a Singaporean professional footballer who plays as a right-back, central-midfielder or right-winger for Lion City Sailors He is the younger brother of Naufal Azman and the twin brother of Akmal Azman who are both professional footballers playing for Geylang International F.C and Tanjong Pagar United F.C., respectively.

== Club ==
=== Tampines Rovers ===
He signed for the Stags in 2019.

=== Tanjong Pagar United ===
In 2022, he was charged with displaying an act of violent conduct by striking an opponent, Young Lions’ Raoul Suhaimi, on the head and therefore bringing the game into disrepute, during the 19th minute of the AIA Singapore Premier League match between Young Lions and Tanjong Pagar United FC. He was found guilty as charged and banned for total of 3 matches and a fine of $500.00.

=== Lion City Sailors ===
In 2025, he moved to Lion City Sailors. He won the Premier League title with the team at end of season.

== Personal life ==
His twin brother, Akmal Azman and older brother, Naufal Azman, are also footballers playing for Geylang International.

== International career ==
Akram was first called up to the national team in 2025, for the matches against Nepal and Hong Kong. He made his maiden appearance against Nepal.

In October 2018, he was first call-up to the Under-21 National Team against Australia U19.

== Career statistics ==
=== Club ===
As of 15 March 2020

Club	Season	S.League		Singapore Cup		Singapore League Cup		Asia		Total	
Club	Season	Apps	Goals	Apps	Goals	Apps	Goals	Apps	Goals	Apps	Goals
BG Tampines Rovers	2019	4	0	0	0	0	0	0	0	4	0
BG Tampines Rovers	2020	2	0	0	0	0	0	0	0	2	0
BG Tampines Rovers	Total	6	0	0	0	0	0	0	0	6	0
Tanjong Pagar United	2022	18	0	1	0	0	0	0	0	19	0
Tanjong Pagar United	2023	21	2	3	0	0	0	0	0	24	2
Tanjong Pagar United	2024–25	13	2	0	0	0	0	0	0	13	2
Tanjong Pagar United	Total	52	4	4	0	0	0	1	0	56	4
Lion City Sailors	2024–25	3	0	3	1	0	0	1	0	7	1
Lion City Sailors	Total	3	0	3	1	0	0	1	0	7	1
Career total		3	0	3	1	0	0	1	0	7	1
