= Abdul Rasaq Akeem =

Singaporean footballer (born 2001)

Abdul Rasaq
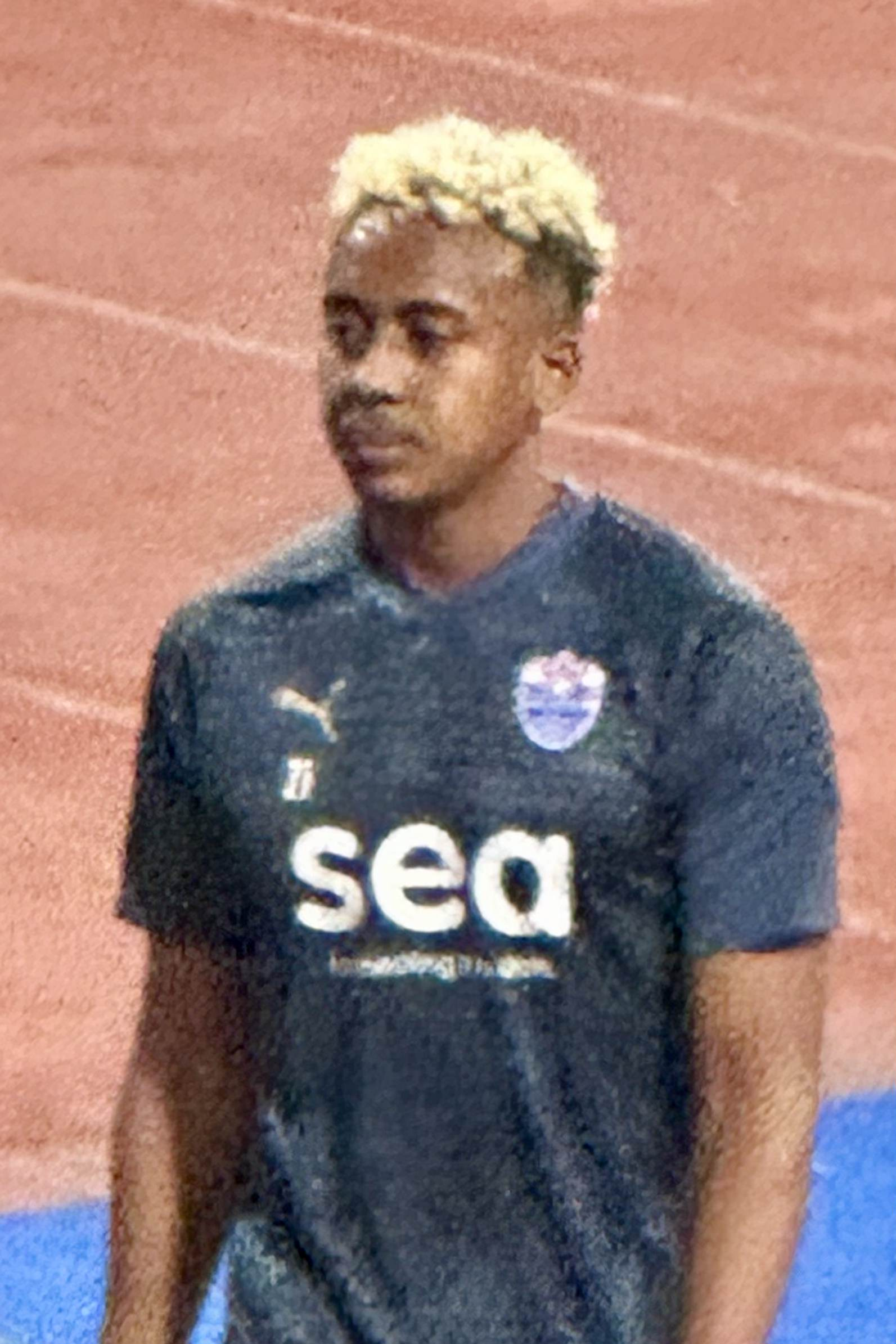
- Abdul Rasaq warming up for Lion City Sailors in 2024

Personal information
- Full name: Abdul Rasaq Ishiekwene Akeem
- Date of birth: 16 June 2001 (age 25)
- Place of birth: Singapore
- Height: 1.75 m (5 ft 9 in)
- Positions: Forward; winger

Team information
- Current team: Lion City Sailors
- Number: 21

Youth career
- NFA

Senior career*
Years	Team	Apps	(Gls)
2019–2022	Young Lions	29	(5)
2023–	Lion City Sailors	40	(13)
2026	→ Albirex Niigata (S) (loan)	16	(4)

International career^{‡}
2019–2022	Singapore U19	3	(0)
2019–	Singapore U22	5	(0)
2023–	Singapore U23	4	(0)
2024–	Singapore	6	(0)
- * Club domestic league appearances and goals as of 8 October 2026 ‡ National team caps and goals as of 21 March 2025

Abdul Rasaq Ishiekwene Akeem (born 16 June 2001), commonly known as Abdul Rasaq, is a Singaporean professional footballer who plays as a forward or a winger for Singapore Premier League club Lion City Sailors, and the Singapore national team.

== Club career ==
=== Young Lions ===
Abdul Rasaq was promoted from the National Football Academy to the Singapore Premier League club, Young Lions ahead of the 2019 season. He scored his first professional career goal against Geylang International on 18 August 2019. In the 2022 season, Abdul Rasaq was featured in most of the matches scoring four goals throughout the season. He amassed a total of 32 appearances and 6 goals throughout his time at the club.

=== Lion City Sailors ===
After completing his National Service with the Singapore Police Force, Abdul Rasaq left Young Lions to join Lion City Sailors ahead of the 2023 season. On 10 April 2023, he scored his first brace of his career in a 5–0 win against Hougang United. Abdul Rasaq would go on to have a breakout season scoring 10 goals in 18 league matches becoming the joint local top goalscorer alongside teammate, Shawal Anuar. He then suffered a long term injury in late August 2023 and was not featured in the 2023 Singapore Cup and the 2023–24 AFC Champions League for the club.

Abdul Rasaq made his return on 14 September 2024 during the 2024–25 season where he scored his first goal on the season by converting a penalty in a 6–0 win over Tanjong Pagar United. In the next match against Balestier Khalsa on 22 September, he scored in a 3–1 win. Despite Maxime Lestienne's equaliser in the 91st minute of the 2025 AFC Champions League Two final against Sharjah, the Sailors finished as a runner-up after conceding in the 97th minute to finish the game in a 1–2 defeat.

==== Loan to Albirex Niigata (S) ====
On 15 January 2026, Abdul Rasaq joined Albirex Niigata (S) on loan for the remainder of the 2025–26 season.

== International career ==
Abdul Rasaq was born to a Nigerian father and Singaporean mother. He is a practicing Muslim.

Abdul Rasaq made his Singapore national team debut on 14 November 2024 in a 3–2 win over Myanmar.

== Career statistics ==
=== Club ===
As of 22 May 2025

Club	Season	League			Cup		Continental		Other		Total	
Club	Season	Division	Apps	Goals	Apps	Goals	Apps	Goals	Apps	Goals	Apps	Goals
Young Lions	2019	Singapore Premier League	11	1	0	0	0	0	0	0	11	1
Young Lions	2020	Singapore Premier League	2	0	0	0	0	0	0	0	2	0
Young Lions	2021	Singapore Premier League	0	0	0	0	0	0	0	0	0	0
Young Lions	2022	Singapore Premier League	16	4	3	1	0	0	0	0	19	5
Young Lions	Total		29	5	3	1	0	0	0	0	32	6
Lion City Sailors	2023	Singapore Premier League	18	10	0	0	0	0	0	0	18	10
Lion City Sailors	2024–25	Singapore Premier League	18	2	5	2	9 (Note: 5 in ASEAN Club Championship and 4 in AFC Champions League Two)	0	0	0	32	4
Lion City Sailors	2025–26	Singapore Premier League	3	1	1	0	7 (Note: 3 in ASEAN Club Championship and 4 in AFC Champions League Two)	0	0	0	11	1
Lion City Sailors	Total		39	13	6	2	16	0	0	0	61	15
Albirex Niigata (S)	2025–26	Singapore Premier League	10	3	0	0	0	0	0	0	10	3
Albirex Niigata (S)	Total		10	3	0	0	0	0	0	0	10	3
Career total			78	21	9	3	16	0	0	0	103	24

== International statistics ==
=== U23 International caps ===
No	Date	Venue	Opponent	Result	Competition
1	24 March 2023	Jalan Besar Stadium, Jalan Besar, Singapore	Hong Kong	0–1 (lost)	Merlion Cup
2	26 March 2023	Jalan Besar Stadium, Jalan Besar, Singapore	Cambodia	1–2 (lost)	Merlion Cup
3	29 April 2023	Prince Stadium, Phnom Penh, Cambodia	Thailand	1–3 (lost)	2023 SEA Games
4	3 May 2023	Prince Stadium, Phnom Penh, Cambodia	Vietnam	1–3 (lost)	2023 SEA Games
5	6 May 2023	Prince Stadium, Phnom Penh, Cambodia	Laos	0-0 (draw)	2023 SEA Games
6	6 Sept 2023	Việt Trì Stadium, Phú Thọ, Vietnam	Yemen	0-3 (lost)	2024 AFC U-23 Asian Cup qualification
7	9 Sept 2023	Việt Trì Stadium, Phú Thọ, Vietnam	Guam	1-1 (draw)	2024 AFC U-23 Asian Cup qualification

=== U22 International caps ===
No	Date	Venue	Opponent	Result	Competition
1	9 October 2019	Bishan Stadium, Bishan, Singapore	United Arab Emirates	0-3 (lost)	Friendly

=== U19 International caps ===
No	Date	Venue	Opponent	Result	Competition
1	19 April 2019	Po Kong Village Road Park, Diamond Hill, Hong Kong	Vietnam	0–1 (lost)	2019 Jockey Cup
2	20 April 2019	Po Kong Village Road Park, Diamond Hill, Hong Kong	Hong Kong	0–2 (lost)	2019 Jockey Cup
3	22 April 2019	Po Kong Village Road Park, Diamond Hill, Hong Kong	Myanmar	1–2 (lost)	2019 Jockey Cup
4	7 August 2019	Thanh Long Stadium, Ho Chi Minh City, Vietnam	Thailand	1-1 (draw)	2019 AFF U-18 Youth Championship
5	9 August 2019	Thống Nhất Stadium, Ho Chi Minh City, Vietnam	Malaysia	1-3 (lost)	2019 AFF U-18 Youth Championship
6	11 August 2019	Gò Đậu Stadium, Ho Chi Minh City, Vietnam	Vietnam	0-3 (lost)	2019 AFF U-18 Youth Championship
7	13 August 2019	Thống Nhất Stadium, Ho Chi Minh City, Vietnam	Cambodia	1-0 (won)	2019 AFF U-18 Youth Championship
8	15 August 2019	Thống Nhất Stadium, Ho Chi Minh City, Vietnam	Australia	0-5 (lost)	2019 AFF U-18 Youth Championship
9	6 November 2019	Aung San Stadium, Yangon, Myanmar	South Korea	0-11 (lost)	2020 AFC U-19 Championship qualification
10	8 November 2019	Thuwunna Stadium, Yangon, Myanmar	China	0-2 (lost)	2020 AFC U-19 Championship qualification
11	10 November 2019	Thuwunna Stadium, Yangon, Myanmar	Myanmar	0-8 (lost)	2020 AFC U-19 Championship qualification

== Honours ==
Lion City Sailors

- AFC Champions League Two runner-up: 2024–25
- Singapore Premier League: 2024–25
- Singapore Cup: 2023, 2024–25, 2025–26
- Singapore Community Shield: 2024; runner-up: 2025
