= Prakash Raj (footballer) =

Singaporean footballer

Personal information
- Full name: Prakash Raj S/O Nanthakumar
- Date of birth: 11 June 1998 (age 28)
- Place of birth: Singapore
- Position: Defender

Senior career*
Years	Team	Apps	(Gls)
2018-2019	Young Lions FC	17	(1)
2021	Tanjong Pagar United	2	(0)
- * Club domestic league appearances and goals

Prakash Raj (born 11 June 1998) is a Singaporean professional footballer who last played as a defender for Tanjong Pagar United.

Prakash signed for the Young Lions FC in 2018.
