= Joshua Pereira =

Singaporean footballer (born 1997)

Personal information
- Full name: Joshua Bernard Pereira
- Date of birth: 10 October 1997 (age 29)
- Place of birth: Singapore
- Height: 1.78 m (5 ft 10 in)
- Positions: Midfielder; defender

Team information
- Current team: Geylang International
- Number: 8

Youth career
- 2013–2014: National Football Academy

Senior career*
Years	Team	Apps	(Gls)
2016–2019	Young Lions	63	(2)
2020–	Geylang International	83	(6)

International career^{‡}
2016	Singapore U19	5	(1)
2016–2018	Singapore U21		
2018–2019	Singapore U22	8	(0)
2022–	Singapore	6	(0)
Medal record
Men's football
Representing Singapore
Merlion Cup
Winner	2019 Singapore
- * Club domestic league appearances and goals as of 02:14, 23 November 2014 (UTC) ‡ National team caps and goals as of 24 December 2022

Joshua Bernard Pereira (born 10 October 1997) is a Singaporean professional footballer who plays either as a midfielder or defender for Singapore Premier League club Geylang International, whom he captains and the Singapore national team.

== Beginnings and breakthrough ==
When Joshua was studying at the Singapore Sports School, he was selected for a week-long stint with J.League club Albirex Niigata's under-18 squad in Japan.

Joshua started his career with the National Football Academy and caught the eye while representing the national under-18 team during their qualification tournament for the 2016 AFC Under-19 Championship.

In December 2015, he won the 2015 Dollah Kassim Award and trained with Ligue 1 side, AS Saint-Étienne from 11 to 19 March 2016.

== Club career ==
=== Young Lions ===
He signed for Young Lions for the 2016 S.League season and impressed the pundits although the team failed to perform as expected.

=== Geylang International ===
In 2020, he signed for Geylang International.

Joshua was named the Club captain for the 2023 Singapore Premier League season onwards.

== International career ==
Pereira was part of the U21 team which played China U21 team in 2016. He captained the U22 in the 2020 AFC U-23 Championship qualification in 2019.

In September 2022, Pereira received his first call up to the senior Singapore squad for the 2022 VFF Tri-Nations Series held in Vietnam. He made his international debut in a 4-0 friendly loss to Vietnam before collecting his second cap in the same friendly tournament in a 1–1 draw against India.

Later in December, Pereira was part of the national team for the 2022 AFF Championship.

== Personal life ==
Pereira studied hospitality and tourism management at Temasek Polytechnic.

== Honours ==
Individual

- Dollah Kassim Award recipients: 2015
- Singapore Premier League Team of the Year: 2022

== Career statistics ==
As of match played 19 Aug 2026. Caps and goals may not be correct

Club	Season	S.League		Singapore Cup		Singapore League Cup		Asia		Total	
Club	Season	Apps	Goals	Apps	Goals	Apps	Goals	Apps	Goals	Apps	Goals
Young Lions	2016	17	0	1	0	-	-	—		18	0
Young Lions	2017	4	0	0	0	0	0	—		4	0
Young Lions	2018	22	1	0	0	0	0	—		22	1
Young Lions	2019	20	1	0	0	0	0	—		20	1
Young Lions	Total	63	2	1	0	0	0	0	0	64	2
Geylang International	2020	3	0	0	0	0	0	0	0	3	0
Geylang International	2021	0	0	0	0	0	0	0	0	0	0
Geylang International	2022	19	0	2	0	0	0	0	0	21	0
Geylang International	2023	21	2	1	0	0	0	0	0	23	2
Geylang International	2024–25	22	1	1	0	0	0	0	0	23	1
Geylang International	2025–26	21	0	4	0	0	0	0	0	25	0
Geylang International	2026–27	6	0	0	0	0	0	0	0	6	0
Geylang International	Total	92	3	8	0	0	0	0	0	101	3
Career total		148	5	7	0	0	0	0	0	156	5

- Young Lions are ineligible for qualification to AFC competitions in their respective leagues.

== International statistics ==
=== International caps ===
No	Date	Venue	Opponent	Result	Competition
1	21 Sept 2022	Thống Nhất Stadium, Ho Chi Minh City, Vietnam	Vietnam	0-4 (lost)	2022 VFF Tri-Nations Series
2	24 Sept 2022	Thống Nhất Stadium, Ho Chi Minh City, Vietnam	India	1-1 (draw)	2022 VFF Tri-Nations Series
3	24 December 2022	Jalan Besar Stadium, Kallang, Singapore	Myanmar	3-2(won)	2022 AFF Championship
4	27 December 2022	New Laos National Stadium, Vientiane, Laos	Laos	2-0(won)	2022 AFF Championship
5	23 March 2023	Mong Kok Stadium, Hong Kong	Hong Kong	1–1 (draw)	Friendly
6	26 March 2023	Macau Olympic Complex Stadium, Macau	Macau	1–0 (won)	Friendly

=== U22 International caps ===
No	Date	Venue	Opponent	Result	Competition
1	20 June 2018	Jalan Besar Stadium, Singapore	Myanmar	0-2 (lost)	Friendly
2	22 March 2019	MFF Football Centre, Ulaanbaatar, Mongolia	Hong Kong	1-1 (draw)	2020 AFC U-23 Championship qualification
3	24 March 2019	MFF Football Centre, Ulaanbaatar, Mongolia	North Korea	1-1 (draw)	2020 AFC U-23 Championship qualification
4	26 March 2019	MFF Football Centre, Ulaanbaatar, Mongolia	Mongolia	3-1 (won)	2020 AFC U-23 Championship qualification
5	7 June 2019	Jalan Besar Stadium, Kallang, Singapore	Philippines	3-0 (won)	2019 Merlion Cup
6	9 June 2019	Jalan Besar Stadium, Kallang, Singapore	Thailand	1-0 (won)	2019 Merlion Cup
7	6 September 2019	Bishan Stadium, Bishan, Singapore	Fiji	2-0 (won)	Friendly
8	3 December 2019	Rizal Memorial Stadium, Manila, Philippines	Vietnam	0-1 (lost)	2019 Southeast Asian Games

=== U19 International caps ===
No	Date	Venue	Opponent	Result	Competition
1	11 September 2016	Hàng Đẫy Stadium, Hanoi, Vietnam	Vietnam	0-0 (draw)	2016 AFF U-19 Youth Championship
2	15 September 2016	Hàng Đẫy Stadium, Hanoi, Vietnam	Malaysia	1-2 (lost)	2016 AFF U-19 Youth Championship
3	17 September 2016	Hàng Đẫy Stadium, Hanoi, Vietnam	Philippines	2-1 (won)	2016 AFF U-19 Youth Championship
4	19 September 2016	Hàng Đẫy Stadium, Hanoi, Vietnam	Timor-Leste	0-2 (lost)	2016 AFF U-19 Youth Championship
5	4 August 2017	Hartfield Park, Australia	Australia	0-4 (lost)	Friendly

=== U19 International goals ===
Scores and results list Singapore's goal tally first.

No.	Date	Venue	Opponent	Score	Result	Competition
1.	17 September 2016	Hàng Đẫy Stadium, Hanoi	Philippines	1–1	2-1	2016 AFF U-19 Youth Championship

== Honours ==
=== International ===
Singapore U22

- Merlion Cup: 2019

=== Individual ===
- The New Paper Dollah Kassim Award : 2015
