= Nur Luqman =

Singaporean footballer

Personal information
- Full name: Nur Luqman bin Abdul Rahman
- Date of birth: 20 June 1998 (age 28)
- Height: 1.66 m (5 ft 5 in)
- Position: Midfielder

Team information
- Current team: Geylang International
- Number: 20

Senior career*
Years	Team	Apps	(Gls)
2019	Young Lions FC	15	(2)
2020–	Geylang International	10	(0)

International career
2019	Singapore U22	1	(0)
- * Club domestic league appearances and goals as of 3 Feb 2021

Nur Luqman bin Abdul Rahman (born 20 June 1998) is a Singaporean footballer currently playing as a midfielder for Geylang International.

== Club career ==
Nur Luqman was signed by Geylang International in 2020 after an impressive season in 2019 with the Young Lions FC.

== Career statistics ==
=== Club ===
As of 23 May 2021.

Club	Season	League			Cup		Continental		Other		Total	
Club	Season	Division	Apps	Goals	Apps	Goals	Apps	Goals	Apps	Goals	Apps	Goals
Young Lions FC	2019	Singapore Premier League	15	2	0	0	0	0	0	0	15	2
Geylang International	2020	Singapore Premier League	10	0	0	0	0	0	0	0	10	0
Geylang International	2021	Singapore Premier League	4	0	0	0	0	0	0	0	4	0
Geylang International	Total		14	0	0	0	0	0	0	0	14	0
Career total			29	2	0	0	0	0	0	0	29	2

== International career ==
Nur Luqman was selected for the 2019 SEA Games squad and played in the match against Vietnam.
