= Zulqarnaen Suzliman =

Singaporean footballer

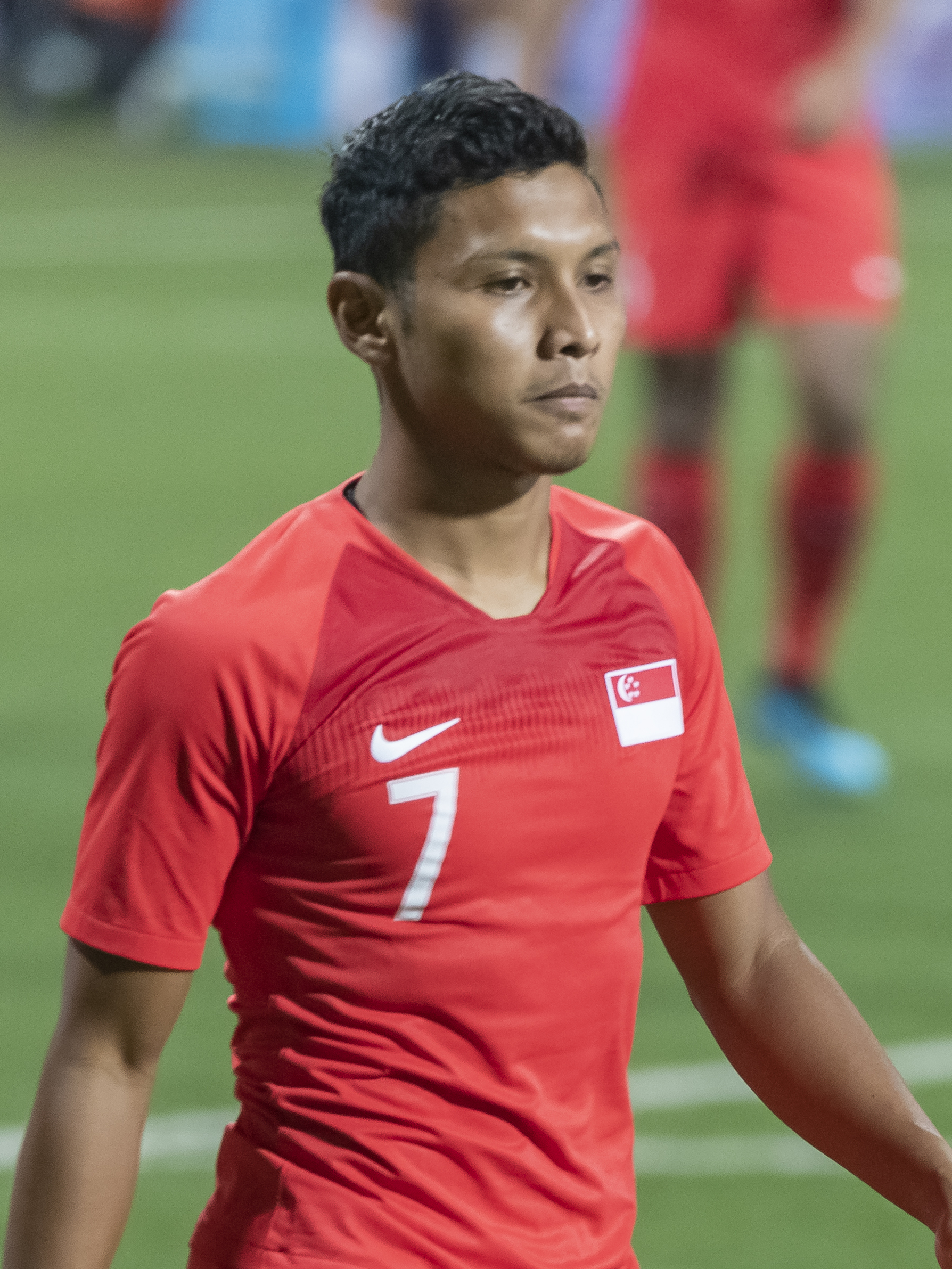
- Zulqaernaen playing for Singapore in 2019

Personal information
- Full name: Muhammad Zulqarnaen bin Suzliman
- Date of birth: 29 March 1998 (age 28)
- Place of birth: Singapore
- Height: 1.69 m (5 ft 7 in)
- Position: Right-back

Team information
- Current team: Hougang United
- Number: 7

Youth career
- 2012–2015: NFA

Senior career*
Years	Team	Apps	(Gls)
2016–2019	Young Lions	60	(2)
2020–2026	Lion City Sailors	22	(0)
2021–2022	→ Young Lions (loan)	15	(2)
2026	→ Albirex Niigata (S) (loan)	15	(2)
2026–	Hougang United	2	(0)

International career
2016	Singapore U16	6	(6)
2016	Singapore U19	2	(0)
2017–2020	Singapore U22	16	(0)
2018–	Singapore	27	(0)
Medal record
Men's football
Representing Singapore
Merlion Cup
Winner	2019 Singapore
- * Club domestic league appearances and goals

Muhammad Zulqarnaen bin Suzliman (born 29 March 1998), also known as Mamat, is a Singaporean professional footballer who plays as a full-back for Singapore Premier League club Hougang United, whom he captains and the Singapore national team.

He is the younger brother of Zulfahdmi Suzliman who plays mainly as winger and striker for Singapore Premier League club Tanjong Pagar United.

== Club career ==
=== Young Lions ===
Zulqarnaen made his professional debut for Young Lions in a 2–0 league match lost to Geylang International on 25 February 2016. He scored his first career goal on 27 February 2017 against Home United.

=== Lion City Sailors ===
On 17 January 2020, Zulqarnaen signed for newly privatised club, Lion City Sailors. He make his debut on 6 March 2020 in a league match against Tanjong Pagar United.

==== Loan to Young Lions ====
In April 2021, Zulqarnaen was loaned to his former club, Young Lions following his National Service commitments. He made a total of 16 appearances for the club.

On 11 June 2022, Zulqarnaen returned to his parent club, Lion City Sailors from Young Lions after completing his national service.

On 26 July 2023, in a friendly match against Tottenham Hotspurs at the Singapore National Stadium, Zulqarnaen was tasked to marked against Son Heung-min who was considered as one of the best players in the world and widely regarded as one of the greatest Asian footballers of all time in which he managed to close down and prevented Son for scoring or dribbling past him for the first half of the match. Zulqarnaen went on to gain worldwide media attention for his excellent defensive work rate against Tottenham. On 9 December 2023, he won the 2023 Singapore Cup after a 3–1 win against defending champion, Hougang United.

On 15 December 2023, Lion City Sailors announce that Zulqaernaen has signed a contract extension with the club,

==== Loan to Albirex Niigata (S) ====
On 5 January 2026, Zulqarnaen joined Albirex Niigata (S) on loan for the remainder of the 2025–26 season.

== International career ==
Zulqarnaen made his professional debut for the Singapore national football team in a friendly 2–0 win over Fiji on 19 September 2018.

Zulqarnaen made his AFF Championship debut in the 2018 campaign on 9 November, with a 1–0 win over Indonesia.

On 21 November, Zulqarnaen started and played 90 minutes in Singapore's 6–1 win over Timor Leste in the 2018 AFF Suzuki Cup.

In March 2024, Zulqarnaen injured his left anterior cruciate ligament during Singapore's away defeat to China in the World Cup qualifiers, sidelining him for a year.

In May 2026, Zulqarnaen received a call-up to the national team for friendlies against Mongolia and China.

== Personal life ==
Zulqaernaen's brothers, Zulkifli, Zulfadhli, Zulfadhmi, are all footballers in Singapore. He served his compulsory National Service from 2020 to 2022.

Zulqarnaen studied at ITE College West from 2016 to 2017.

== Career statistics ==
=== Club ===
As of match played 15 December 2023.

Club	Season	S.League		Singapore Cup		Singapore League Cup		Asia		Total	
Club	Season	Apps	Goals	Apps	Goals	Apps	Goals	Apps	Goals	Apps	Goals
Young Lions	2016	2	0	0	0	0	0	0	0	2	0
Young Lions	2017	19	1	0	0	0	0	0	0	19	1
Young Lions	2018	18	0	0	0	0	0	0	0	18	0
Young Lions	2019	21	1	0	0	0	0	0	0	21	1
Young Lions	Total	60	2	0	0	0	0	0	0	60	2
Lion City Sailors	2020	2	0	0	0	0	0	0	0	2	0
Lion City Sailors	Total	2	0	0	0	0	0	0	0	2	0
Young Lions (loan)	2021	13	0	0	0	0	0	0	0	13	0
Young Lions (loan)	2022	3	1	0	0	0	0	0	0	3	1
Young Lions (loan)	Total	16	1	0	0	0	0	0	0	16	1
Lion City Sailors	2022	3	0	0	0	0	0	0	0	3	0
Lion City Sailors	2023	18	0	6	0	0	0	6	0	30	0
Lion City Sailors	2024–25	2	0	0	0	0	0	0	0	2	0
Lion City Sailors	2025–26	1	0	0	0	0	0	0	0	1	0
Lion City Sailors	Total	24	0	6	0	0	0	6	0	36	0
Career total		102	3	6	0	0	0	6	0	114	3

=== International ===
Appearances and goals by national team and year
National team	Year	Apps	Goals
Singapore	2018	7	0
Singapore	2019	4	0
Singapore	2021	8	0
Singapore	2022	2	0
Total		21	0

=== Senior international caps ===
No	Date	Venue	Opponent	Result	Competition
1	7 September 2018	Bishan Stadium, Bishan, Singapore	Mauritius	1–1 (draw)	Friendly
2	12 October 2018	Bishan Stadium, Bishan, Singapore	Mongolia	2-–0 (won)	Friendly
3	16 October 2018	Phnom Penh Olympic Stadium, Phnom Penh, Cambodia	Cambodia	2–1 (won)	Friendly
4	9 November 2018	Singapore Sports Hub, Kallang, Singapore	Indonesia	1–0 (won)	2018 AFF Championship
5	13 November 2018	Panaad Stadium, Bacolod, Philippines	Philippines	0–1 (lost)	2018 AFF Championship
6	21 November 2018	Singapore Sports Hub, Kallang, Singapore	Timor-Leste	6–1 (won)	2018 AFF Championship
7	25 November 2018	Rajamangala Stadium, Bangkok, Thailand	Thailand	0–3 (lost)	2018 AFF Championship
8	5 September 2019	National Stadium, Kallang, Singapore	Yemen	2–2 (draw)	2022 FIFA World Cup qualification – AFC second round
9	10 September 2019	Jalan Besar Stadium, Kallang, Singapore	Palestine	2–1 (won)	2022 FIFA World Cup qualification – AFC second round
10	5 October 2019	Amman International Stadium, Amman, Jordan	Jordan	0–0 (draw)	Friendly
11	10 October 2019	King Abdullah Sport City Stadium, Buraidah, Saudi Arabia	Saudi Arabia	0–3 (lost)	2022 FIFA World Cup qualification – AFC second round
12	3 June 2021	King Fahd Sports City, Riyadh, Saudi Arabia	Palestine	0–4 (lost)	2022 FIFA World Cup qualification – AFC second round
13	7 June 2021	King Fahd International Stadium, Riyadh, Saudi Arabia	Uzbekistan	0–5 (lost)	2022 FIFA World Cup qualification – AFC second round
14	5 December 2021	National Stadium, Kallang, Singapore	Myanmar	3–0 (won)	2020 AFF Championship
15	8 December 2021	National Stadium, Kallang, Singapore	Philippines	2–1 (won)	2020 AFF Championship
16	14 December 2021	National Stadium, Kallang, Singapore	Timor-Leste	2–0 (won)	2020 AFF Championship
17	18 December 2021	National Stadium, Kallang, Singapore	Thailand	0–2 (lost)	2020 AFF Championship
18	22 December 2021	National Stadium, Kallang, Singapore	Indonesia	1–1 (draw)	2020 AFF Championship
19	25 December 2021	National Stadium, Kallang, Singapore	Indonesia	4–2 (lost)	2020 AFF Championship
20	26 March 2022	National Stadium, Kallang, Singapore	Malaysia	2–1 (won)	2022 FAS Tri-Nations Series
21	29 March 2022	National Stadium, Kallang, Singapore	Philippines	2–0 (won)	2022 FAS Tri-Nations Series
22	8 August 2023	Bishan Stadium, Bishan, Singapore	Tajikistan	0–2 (lost)	Friendly
23	12 August 2023	Bishan Stadium, Bishan, Singapore	Chinese Taipei	3–1 (won)	Friendly
24	12 October 2023	National Stadium, Kallang, Singapore	Guam	2–0 (won)	2026 FIFA World Cup qualification
25	17 October 2023	GFA National Training Center, Dededo, Guam	Guam	0–1(won)	2026 FIFA World Cup qualification
26	21 March 2024	National Stadium, Kallang, Singapore	China	2–2 (draw)	2026 FIFA World Cup qualification
27	26 March 2024	Tianjin Olympic Center, Tianjin, China	China	1–4 (lost)	2026 FIFA World Cup qualification

=== U22 International caps ===
No	Date	Venue	Opponent	Result	Competition
1	12 July 2017	Choa Chu Kang Stadium, Singapore	India	1-0 (won)	Friendly
2	21 March 2018	National Stadium, Singapore	Indonesia	0-3 (lost)	Friendly
3	25 April 2018	Hassanal Bolkiah National Stadium, Brunei	Laos	5-1 (won)	2018 Hassanal Bolkiah Trophy
4	30 April 2018	Hassanal Bolkiah National Stadium, Brunei	Cambodia	0-1 (lost)	2018 Hassanal Bolkiah Trophy
5	2 May 2018	Hassanal Bolkiah National Stadium, Brunei	Timor-Leste	1-2 (lost)	2018 Hassanal Bolkiah Trophy
6	20 June 2018	Jalan Besar Stadium, Singapore	Myanmar	0-2 (lost)	Friendly
7	22 March 2019	MFF Football Centre, Ulaanbaatar, Mongolia	Hong Kong	1-1 (draw)	2020 AFC U-23 Championship qualification
8	24 March 2019	MFF Football Centre, Ulaanbaatar, Mongolia	North Korea	1-1 (draw)	2020 AFC U-23 Championship qualification
9	26 March 2019	MFF Football Centre, Ulaanbaatar, Mongolia	Mongolia	3-1 (won)	2020 AFC U-23 Championship qualification
10	7 June 2019	Jalan Besar Stadium, Kallang, Singapore	Philippines	3-0 (w0n)	2019 Merlion Cup
11	9 June 2019	Jalan Besar Stadium, Kallang, Singapore	Thailand	1-0 (won)	2019 Merlion Cup
12	26 November 2019	Rizal Memorial Stadium, Manila, Philippines	Laos	0-0 (draw)	2019 Southeast Asian Games
13	28 November 2019	Rizal Memorial Stadium, Manila, Philippines	Indonesia	0-2 (lost)	2019 Southeast Asian Games
14	1 December 2019	Biñan Football Stadium, Manila, Philippines	Thailand	0-3 (lost)	2019 Southeast Asian Games
15	3 December 2019	Rizal Memorial Stadium, Manila, Philippines	Vietnam	0-1 (lost)	2019 Southeast Asian Games
16	5 December 2019	Rizal Memorial Stadium, Manila, Philippines	Brunei	7-0 (won)	2019 Southeast Asian Games

=== U19 International caps ===
No	Date	Venue	Opponent	Result	Competition
1	11 September 2016	Hàng Đẫy Stadium, Hanoi, Vietnam	Vietnam	0-0 (draw)	2016 AFF U-19 Youth Championship
2	15 September 2016	Hàng Đẫy Stadium, Hanoi, Vietnam	Malaysia	1-2 (lost)	2016 AFF U-19 Youth Championship

=== U16 International caps ===
He was called up to the National U16 team for the 2014 Asian Football Confederation (AFC) Under-16 Championship qualifiers.

No	Date	Venue	Opponent	Result	Competition
1	23 August 2013	Wunna Theikdi Stadium, Naypyidaw, Myanmar	Malaysia	1-1 (draw)	2013 AFF U-16 Youth Championship
2	25 August 2013	Wunna Theikdi Stadium, Naypyidaw, Myanmar	Philippines	2-0 (won)	2013 AFF U-16 Youth Championship
3	27 August 2013	Wunna Theikdi Stadium, Naypyidaw, Myanmar	Indonesia	1-1 (draw)	2013 AFF U-16 Youth Championship
4	29 August 2013	Zeyar Thiri Stadium, Naypyidaw, Myanmar	Laos	2-4 (lost)	2013 AFF U-16 Youth Championship
5	21 September 2013	Hong Kong Football Club Stadium, Happy Valley, Hong Kong	Hong Kong	1-4 (lost)	2014 AFC U-16 Championship qualification
6	25 September 2013	Hong Kong Football Club Stadium, Happy Valley, Hong Kong	Chinese Taipei	3-1 (won)	2014 AFC U-16 Championship qualification
7	27 September 2013	Hong Kong Football Club Stadium, Happy Valley, Hong Kong	Macau	9-0 (won)	2014 AFC U-16 Championship qualification
8	29 September 2013	Hong Kong Football Club Stadium, Happy Valley, Hong Kong	Australia	1-3 (lost)	2014 AFC U-16 Championship qualification

=== U16 International goals ===
Scores and results list Singapore's goal tally first.

No.	Date	Venue	Opponent	Score	Result	Competition
1.	23 August 2013	Wunna Theikdi Stadium, Naypyidaw, Myanmar	Malaysia	1–1	1-1	2013 AFF U-16 Youth Championship
2.	25 August 2013	Wunna Theikdi Stadium, Naypyidaw, Myanmar	Philippines	1–0	2-0	2013 AFF U-16 Youth Championship
3.	27 August 2013	Wunna Theikdi Stadium, Naypyidaw, Myanmar	Indonesia	1–0	1-1	2013 AFF U-16 Youth Championship
4	21 September 2013	Hong Kong Football Club Stadium, Happy Valley, Hong Kong	Hong Kong	1-4	1-4 (lost)	2014 AFC U-16 Championship qualification
5	27 September 2013	Hong Kong Football Club Stadium, Happy Valley, Hong Kong	Macau	1-0	9-0 (won)	2014 AFC U-16 Championship qualification
6	27 September 2013	Hong Kong Football Club Stadium, Happy Valley, Hong Kong	Macau	2-0	9-0 (won)	2014 AFC U-16 Championship qualification

== Honours ==
Lion City Sailors

- AFC Champions League Two runner-up: 2024–25
- Singapore Premier League: 2024–25
- Singapore Cup: 2023, 2024–25
- Singapore Community Shield: 2024; runner-up: 2025

Singapore U22

- Merlion Cup: 2019

== Others ==
=== Singapore Selection Squad ===
He was selected as part of the Singapore Selection squad for The Sultan of Selangor’s Cup to be held on 24 August 2019.
