= Haiqal Pashia =

Singaporean footballer (born 1998)

Personal information
- Full name: Haiqal Pashia Anugrah
- Date of birth: 29 November 1998 (age 27)
- Place of birth: Singapore
- Position: Midfielder

Team information
- Current team: Hougang United
- Number: 24

Youth career
- 2011–2016: National Football Academy

Senior career*
Years	Team	Apps	(Gls)
2017–2019	Young Lions	51	(6)
2020–2025	Lion City Sailors	63	(7)
2025–	Hougang United	13	(0)

International career^{‡}
2013	Singapore U16		(2)
2015–2017	Singapore U19	12	(4)
2017–2019	Singapore U22	10	(0)
Medal record
Men's football
Representing Singapore
Merlion Cup
Winner	2019 Singapore
- * Club domestic league appearances and goals as of 18:10, 14 June 2025 (UTC) ‡ National team caps and goals as of 16:09, 3 November 2019 (UTC)

Haiqal Pashia Anugrah (born 29 November 1998) is a Singaporean professional footballer who plays as a midfielder for Singapore Premier League club Hougang United.

== Club career ==
=== Young Lions ===
In 2017, Pashia made his professional football debut after signing for the Young Lions for the 2017 S.League season. He played his first match in the league against Home United where he came off the bench in the 64th minute in the 6–1 lost. On 14 October, Pashia scored his first career goal which turns into an eventual 4–0 win against Warriors.

=== Lion City Sailors ===
On 14 February 2020, Pashia joined newly privatised club, Lion City Sailors.

On 20 July 2023, Pashia make his 50th appearances for the Sailors in a 3–2 win against Tanjong Pagar United. On 13 August 2023, Pashia scored his first goal of the season against Hougang United to secure a 8–2 win.

On 22 July 2024, Pashia scored his first goal of the 2024–25 season in a 6–0 win over Young Lions. Despite Maxime Lestienne's equaliser in the 91st minute of the 2025 AFC Champions League Two final against Sharjah, the Sailors finished as a runner-up after conceding in the 97th minute to finish the game in a 1–2 defeat. It was announced on 8 June 2025 that Pashia would be leaving the club following the expiry of his contract.

== International career ==
=== Youth ===
While representing the under-19 at the 2016 AFF U-19 Youth Championship, Haiqal scored the winner against Philippines.

=== Senior ===
Haiqal was first called up to the national team one day before the friendly against Fiji on 11 September 2018 as a replacement for the injured Iqbal Hussain.

== Personal life ==
Haiqal younger brother, Rezza Rezky also played in the Singapore Premier League club for Young Lions. Both were called up to the 2019 Merlion Cup.

== Career statistics ==
=== Club ===
As of match played 14 June 2025

Club	Season	League			National cup		League cup		Continental		Other		Total	
Club	Season	Division	Apps	Goals	Apps	Goals	Apps	Goals	Apps	Goals	Apps	Goals	Apps	Goals
Young Lions	2017	S.League	15	1	0	0	0	0	–		0	0	15	1
Young Lions	2018	Singapore Premier League	17	3	0	0	0	0	–		0	0	17	3
Young Lions	2019	Singapore Premier League	19	2	0	0	0	0	–		0	0	19	2
Young Lions	Total		51	6	0	0	0	0	0	0	0	0	51	6
Lion City Sailors	2020	Singapore Premier League	9	0	0	0	0	0	0	0	0	0	9	0
Lion City Sailors	2021	Singapore Premier League	15	3	0	0	0	0	0	0	0	0	15	3
Lion City Sailors	2022	Singapore Premier League	13	1	2	0	0	0	2 (Note: Appearance(s) in AFC Champions League Elite)	0	1 (Note: Appearance(s) in Singapore Community Shield)	0	18	1
Lion City Sailors	2023	Singapore Premier League	10	2	5	0	0	0	4	0	0	0	21	2
Lion City Sailors	2024–25	Singapore Premier League	16	1	1	0	0	0	0	0	2 (Note: Appearance(s) in ASEAN Club Championship)	0	19	1
Lion City Sailors	Total		63	7	8	0	0	0	6	0	3	0	80	7
Career total			114	13	8	0	0	0	6	0	3	0	131	13

- Young Lions are ineligible for qualification to AFC competitions in their respective leagues.

== Honours ==
=== Club ===
Lion City Sailors

- AFC Champions League Two runner-up: 2024–25
- Singapore Premier League: 2021, 2024–25
- Singapore Cup: 2023, 2024–25
- Singapore Community Shield: 2022, 2024

=== International ===
Singapore U22

- Merlion Cup: 2019
