= Nur Adam Abdullah =

Singaporean footballer (born 2001)

Personal information
- Full name: Muhammad Nur Adam bin Abdullah
- Date of birth: 13 April 2001 (age 25)
- Place of birth: Singapore
- Height: 1.68 m (5 ft 6 in)
- Position: Left-back

Team information
- Current team: Lion City Sailors
- Number: 20

Youth career
- –2018: National Football Academy

Senior career*
Years	Team	Apps	(Gls)
2019–2020	Young Lions	18	(0)
2021–	Lion City Sailors	68	(0)
2024–2025	→ Young Lions (loan)	20	(0)

International career^{‡}
2017–2019	Singapore U19	17	(0)
2021–	Singapore U23	9	(1)
2021–	Singapore	22	(0)
- * Club domestic league appearances and goals as of 11 October 2026 ‡ National team caps and goals as of 1 October 2026

Muhammad Nur Adam bin Abdullah (born 16 June 2001) better known Nur Adam, is a Singaporean professional footballer who plays either as a full-back or winger for Singapore Premier League club Lion City Sailors and the Singapore national team.

== Beginnings and breakthrough ==
Nur Adam went on a training stints with Japan clubs, Matsumoto Yamaga and Omiya Ardija in 2015 and 2017 respectively which he was left impressed by the strong work ethic and technical ability.

Nur Adam was nominated for the Dollah Kassim award in 2016 but didn't win the award. He was nominated again in 2018 and won the award. Six months after winning the 2018 Dollah Kassim award, Nur Adam Abdullah begins his training stint with Belgian side, KRC Genk for a one-week training stint club. He also earn himself the chance to be promoted from the national under-18 team to the Singapore Premier League club, Young Lions for the 2019 season.

== Club career ==
=== Young Lions ===
Nur Adam joins Young Lions from NFA in ahead of the 2019 Singapore Premier League season.

=== Lion City Sailors ===
After 2 seasons at Young Lions, 19-year old Nur Adam join the newly privatized club, Lion City Sailors. On 2 April 2021, he make his debut against Tampines Rovers in a 3-3 draw.

Nur Adam goes on to win the 2021 Singapore Premier League title in his first season at the club which he also wins both individual award, the 2021 Young Player of the Year award becoming the first defender to win the award since Sirina Camara did so in 2013 and also being in the 2021 Team of the Year.

Nur Adam helped the Sailors win the 2022 Singapore Community Shield. He was named in the 2022 AFC Champions League squad list that travel to Buriram.

On 1 July 2023, Nur Adam make his 50th appearance for the Sailors in a 1–7 away win against Tanjong Pagar United.

==== Young Lions (loan) ====
In January 2024, Nur Adam returned to the Young Lions on loan from his parent club Lion City Sailors, following his enlistment to National Service.

== International career ==
Nur Adam received his first senior national team call-up in a training session in March 2021.

On 11 November 2021, Nur Adam made his international debut for the Singapore national team in a friendly match against Kyrgyzstan. On 18 December 2021, Nur Adam made his competitive debut at the 2020 AFF Championship with a 0–2 loss against Thailand.

== Career statistics ==
=== Club ===
As of 30 June 2026

Club	Season	League			Cup		AFC Competition		Shopee Cup		Total	
Club	Season	Division	Apps	Goals	Apps	Goals	Apps	Goals	Apps	Goals	Apps	Goals
Young Lions	2019	Singapore Premier League	5	0	0	0	0	0	0	0	5	0
Young Lions	2020	Singapore Premier League	13	0	0	0	0	0	0	0	13	0
Young Lions	Total		18	0	0	0	0	0	0	0	18	0
Lion City Sailors	2021	Singapore Premier League	16	0	0	0	0	0	0	0	16	0
Lion City Sailors	2022	Singapore Premier League	18	0	1	0	5	0	0	0	24	0
Lion City Sailors	2023	Singapore Premier League	17	0	0	0	0	0	0	0	17	0
Lion City Sailors	Total		51	0	1	0	5	0	0	0	57	0
Young Lions	2024–25	Singapore Premier League	20	0	1	0	0	0	0	0	21	0
Young Lions	Total		20	0	1	0	0	0	0	0	21	0
Lion City Sailors	2025–26	Singapore Premier League	13	0	1	0	0	0	3	0	17	0
Lion City Sailors	2026–27	Singapore Premier League	0	0	0	0	0	0	0	0	0	0
Lion City Sailors	Total		13	0	1	0	0	0	3	0	17	0
Career total			92	0	3	0	5	0	3	0	113	0

=== International ===
Appearances and goals by national team and year
National team	Year	Apps	Goals
Singapore
Singapore	2021	4	0
Total		4	0

==== International caps ====
No	Date	Venue	Opponent	Result	Competition
1	11 November 2021	Al Hamriya Sports Club Stadium, Sharjah, UAE	Kyrgyzstan	1-2 (lost)	Friendly
2	18 December 2021	National Stadium, Kallang, Singapore	Thailand	0-2(lost)	2020 AFF Championship
3	22 December 2021	National Stadium, Kallang, Singapore	Indonesia	1-1(draw)	2020 AFF Championship
4	25 December 2021	National Stadium, Kallang, Singapore	Indonesia	4-2(lost)	2020 AFF Championship
5	1 June 2022	Al Nahyan Stadium, Abu Dhabi, United Arab Emirates	Kuwait	0–2 (lost)	Friendly
6	8 June 2022	Dolen Omurzakov Stadium, Bishkek, Kyrgyzstan	Kyrgyzstan	1–2 (lost)	2023 AFC Asian Cup qualification
7	11 June 2022	Dolen Omurzakov Stadium, Bishkek, Kyrgyzstan	Tajikistan	0–1 (lost)	2023 AFC Asian Cup qualification
8	14 June 2022	Dolen Omurzakov Stadium, Bishkek, Kyrgyzstan	Myanmar	6–2 (won)	2023 AFC Asian Cup qualification

==== U23 International caps ====
No	Date	Venue	Opponent	Result	Competition
1	25 October 2021	Jalan Besar Stadium, Jalan Besar, Singapore	Timor-Leste	2-2 (draw)	2022 AFC U-23 Asian Cup qualification
2	31 October 2021	Jalan Besar Stadium, Jalan Besar, Singapore	South Korea	1-5 (lost)	2022 AFC U-23 Asian Cup qualification
3	7 May 2022	Thiên Trường Stadium, Nam Định, Vietnam	Laos	2–2 (draw)	2021 Southeast Asian Games
4	9 May 2022	Thiên Trường Stadium, Nam Định, Vietnam	Thailand	0–5 (lost)	2021 Southeast Asian Games
5	11 May 2022	Thiên Trường Stadium, Nam Định, Vietnam	Cambodia	1–0 (won)	2021 Southeast Asian Games
6	14 May 2022	Thiên Trường Stadium, Nam Định, Vietnam	Malaysia	2–2 (draw)	2021 Southeast Asian Games
7	29 April 2023	Prince Stadium, Phnom Penh, Cambodia	Thailand	1–3 (lost)	2023 SEA Games
8	3 May 2023	Prince Stadium, Phnom Penh, Cambodia	Vietnam	1–3 (lost)	2023 SEA Games
9	6 May 2023	Prince Stadium, Phnom Penh, Cambodia	Laos	0-0 (draw)	2023 SEA Games
10	6 Sept 2023	Việt Trì Stadium, Phú Thọ, Vietnam	Yemen	0-3 (lost)	2024 AFC U-23 Asian Cup qualification
11	9 Sept 2023	Việt Trì Stadium, Phú Thọ, Vietnam	Guam	1-1 (draw)	2024 AFC U-23 Asian Cup qualification

==== U23 International goals ====
No	Date	Venue	Opponent	Score	Result	Competition
1	31 October 2021	Jalan Besar Stadium, Jalan Besar, Singapore	South Korea	1-5	1-5 (lost)	2022 AFC U-23 Asian Cup qualification

==== U19 International caps ====
No	Date	Venue	Opponent	Result	Competition
1	4 September 2017	Thuwunna Stadium, Yangon, Myanmar	Cambodia	5-3 (won)	2017 AFF U-18 Youth Championship
2	12 September 2017	Thuwunna Stadium, Yangon, Myanmar	Timor-Leste	1-3 (lost)	2017 AFF U-18 Youth Championship
3	4 November 2017	MFF Football Centre, Ulaanbaatar, Mongolia	Thailand	0-2 (lost)	2018 AFC U-19 Championship qualification
4	6 November 2017	MFF Football Centre, Ulaanbaatar, Mongolia	Japan	0-7 (lost)	2018 AFC U-19 Championship qualification
5	8 November 2017	MFF Football Centre, Ulaanbaatar, Mongolia	Mongolia	2-4 (lost)	2018 AFC U-19 Championship qualification
6	1 July 2018	Gelora Joko Samudro Stadium, Gresik, Indonesia	Philippines	1-2 (lost)	2018 AFF U-18 Youth Championship
7	3 July 2018	Gelora Joko Samudro Stadium, Gresik, Indonesia	Indonesia	0-4 (lost)	2018 AFF U-18 Youth Championship
8	5 July 2018	Gelora Joko Samudro Stadium, Gresik, Indonesia	Thailand	0-6 (lost)	2018 AFF U-18 Youth Championship
9	7 July 2018	Gelora Joko Samudro Stadium, Gresik, Indonesia	Laos	0-5 (lost)	2018 AFF U-18 Youth Championship
10	9 July 2018	Gelora Joko Samudro Stadium, Gresik, Indonesia	Vietnam	2-2 (draw)	2018 AFF U-18 Youth Championship
11	19 April 2019	Po Kong Village Road Park, Diamond Hill, Hong Kong	Vietnam	0–1 (lost)	2019 Jockey Cup
12	20 April 2019	Po Kong Village Road Park, Diamond Hill, Hong Kong	Hong Kong	0–2 (lost)	2019 Jockey Cup
13	22 April 2019	Po Kong Village Road Park, Diamond Hill, Hong Kong	Myanmar	1–2 (lost)	2019 Jockey Cup
14	7 August 2019	Thanh Long Stadium, Ho Chi Minh City, Vietnam	Thailand	1–1 (draw)	2019 AFF U-18 Youth Championship
15	9 August 2019	Thống Nhất Stadium, Ho Chi Minh City, Vietnam	Malaysia	1-3 (lost)	2019 AFF U-18 Youth Championship
16	11 August 2019	Gò Đậu Stadium, Ho Chi Minh City, Vietnam	Vietnam	0-3 (lost)	2019 AFF U-18 Youth Championship
17	13 August 2019	Thống Nhất Stadium, Ho Chi Minh City, Vietnam	Cambodia	1-0 (won)	2019 AFF U-18 Youth Championship
18	15 August 2019	Thống Nhất Stadium, Ho Chi Minh City, Vietnam	Australia	0-5 (lost)	2019 AFF U-18 Youth Championship
19	8 November 2019	Thuwunna Stadium, Yangon, Myanmar	China	0-2 (lost)	2020 AFC U-19 Championship qualification
20	10 November 2019	Thuwunna Stadium, Yangon, Myanmar	Myanmar	0-8 (lost)	2020 AFC U-19 Championship qualification

== Honours ==
=== Club ===
Lion City Sailors

- Singapore Premier League: 2021
- Singapore Community Shield: 2022
- Singapore Cup: 2023, 2025–26

=== Individual ===
- Singapore Premier League Team of the Year: 2021
- Singapore Premier League Young Player of the Year: 2021
