= Saifullah Akbar =

Singaporean professional footballer

Personal information
- Full name: Muhammad Saifullah bin Mohammad Akbar
- Date of birth: January 31, 1999 (age 27)
- Place of birth: Singapore
- Height: 1.65 m (5 ft 5 in)
- Positions: Winger; attacking midfielder

Team information
- Current team: Hougang United
- Number: 28

Youth career
- –2016: Tampines Rovers

Senior career*
Years	Team	Apps	(Gls)
2016	Tampines Rovers	1	(0)
2018–2019	Young Lions	24	(3)
2020–2022	Lion City Sailors	47	(7)
2023–2026	Tampines Rovers	36	(1)
2024-2025	→ Geylang International (loan)	15	(0)
2026–	Hougang United	14	(2)

International career^{‡}
2016–2017	Singapore U19	4	(2)
2019–	Singapore U23	10	(2)
2021–	Singapore	5	(0)
Medal record
Men's football
Representing SIN
Merlion Cup (gold)
- * Club domestic league appearances and goals as of 5 February 2021 ‡ National team caps and goals as of 18 December 2021

Muhammad Saifullah bin Muhammad Akbar (born 31 January 1999) is a Singaporean professional footballer who plays either as a winger or attacking-midfielder for Singapore Premier League club Hougang United and the Singapore national team.

== Youth and early life ==
At the age of six, he started playing football and quickly gained entry into the then-called Five Star Football Academy.

== Club career ==
Touted as a prospective footballer ever since childhood, Saifullah participated in the Lion City Cup with Ikhsan Fandi playing for the NFA U-16.

Saifullah trained with Australian side Newcastle Jets in 2015, impressing their coaching staff. However, no deal was surfaced. Previously, he had a five-day training stint with Queens Park Rangers in England. Also, he had a two-week stint at FC Metz, funded by the Singapore Sport School.

On his debut, Saifullah scored a goal to secure a 6–4 win for Tampines Rovers over Hougang United in the Singapore League Cup. After training daily with the first team throughout the 2015 S.League season, he joined their Prime League squad with the aim of making the Singapore roster for the biannual 2017 SEA Games.

Saifullah joined Young Lions after his national service and played the out the remainder of the 2018 campaign. While on trial at Spanish club, CD Tenerife, he did enough to be offered a contract with the club's B team, however he chose to remain with Young Lions for the 2019 Singapore Premier League season due to developmental reasons. Saifullah became a key member of the Young Lions squad that season, featuring regularly on the wing under Fandi Ahmad.

== International career ==
Saifullah represented Singapore at the 2013 Asian Youth Games in China. In 2016, he was called up for the Singapore U19s against Bahrain.

On 17 May 2021, Saifullah was called up to the Singaporean national team for the Asian World Cup qualifiers in June. On 3 June, he made his senior debut in a defeat to Palestine, coming on as a substitute for Hafiz Nor in the 65th minute.

== Personal life ==
Saifullah's father is Akbar Nawas, who is his current head coach at Tampines Rovers. Saifullah volunteered for early national service enlistment. As a hobby, he plays guitar and sings and supports Chelsea.

In 2025, Saifullah started his own podcast channel on YouTube alongside his two friends interviewing local footballers on their career.

== Career statistics ==
=== Club ===
As of 25 October 2022

Club	Season	League			Singapore Cup		League Cup		AFC Cup		Total	
Club	Season	Division	Apps	Goals	Apps	Goals	Apps	Goals	Apps	Goals	Apps	Goals
Tampines Rovers	2016	S.League	1	0	0	0	5	2	0	0	6	2
Tampines Rovers	Total		1	0	0	0	5	2	0	0	6	2
Young Lions	2018	Singapore Premier League	3	0	0	0	0	0	0	0	3	0
Young Lions	2019	Singapore Premier League	21	3	0	0	0	0	0	0	21	3
Young Lions	Total		24	3	0	0	0	0	0	0	24	3
Lion City Sailors	2020	Singapore Premier League	11	2	0	0	0	0	0	0	11	2
Lion City Sailors	2021	Singapore Premier League	20	4	0	0	0	0	0	0	20	4
Lion City Sailors	2022	Singapore Premier League	16	1	0	0	0	0	0	0	16	1
Lion City Sailors	Total		47	7	0	0	0	0	0	0	47	7
Tampines Rovers	2023	Singapore Premier League	21	1	7	1	0	0	1	0	29	2
Tampines Rovers	2024–25	Singapore Premier League	15	0	0	0	0	0	2	0	17	0
Tampines Rovers	Total		36	1	7	1	0	0	3	0	46	2
Career total			108	11	7	1	5	2	3	0	123	14

=== International ===
Appearances and goals by national team and year
National team	Year	Apps	Goals
Singapore	2021	5	0
Total		5	0

== Honours ==
=== Club ===
==== Tampines Rovers ====
- Singapore Community Shield: 2025

=== International ===
Singapore U22

- Merlion Cup: 2019

=== Individual ===
- Singapore Premier League Young Player of the Year: 2020
