= 2023 Tampines Rovers FC season =

Tampines Rovers FC
2023 season
- Chairman: Desmond Ong
- Coach: Gavin Lee
- Ground: Our Tampines Hub
Home colours	Away colours

The 2023 season was Tampines Rovers' 28th season at the top level of Singapore football and their 78th year in existence as a football club. The club also competed in the Singapore League Cup, the Singapore Cup, and the AFC Cup.

== Squad ==
=== Singapore Premier League ===
As of Oct 21, 2021

No.	Name	Nationality	Date of Birth (Age)	Last club	Contract Since	Contract End
Goalkeepers
24	Syazwan Buhari (Vice-Captain) ^{O30}	(Singapore)	22 September 1992 (age 34)	(Singapore) Geylang International	2018	2023
31	Ridhuan Barudin ^{O30}	(Singapore)	23 March 1987 (age 39)	(Singapore) Hougang United	2023	2023
Defenders
4	Shuya Yamashita	(Japan)	16 April 1999 (age 27)	(Japan) Albirex Niigata (S)	2022	2023
11	Glenn Kweh ^{U23}	(Singapore)	26 March 2000 (age 26)	(Singapore) Young Lions FC	2023	2024
12	Amirul Haikal	(Singapore)	11 October 1999 (age 27)	(Singapore) Young Lions FC	2021	2023
22	Syahrul Sazali	(Singapore)	3 June 1998 (age 28)	(Singapore) Young Lions FC	2022	2023
23	Irfan Najeeb (Vice-Captain)	(Singapore)	31 July 1999 (age 27)	(Singapore) Young Lions FC	2021	2023
33	Miloš Zlatković	(Serbia)	1 January 1997 (age 29)	(Malta) Balzan	2023	2025
45	Hamizan Hisham ^{U23}	(Singapore)	10 November 2001 (age 25)	(Singapore) Young Lions FC	2019	2023
Midfielders
7	Yasir Hanapi (Captain) ^{O30}	(Singapore)	21 June 1989 (age 37)	(Malaysia) PDRM FA	2018	2023
8	Shah Shahiran	(Singapore)	14 November 1999 (age 27)	(Singapore) Young Lions FC	2023	2027
10	Kyoga Nakamura (Vice-Captain)	(Japan)	25 April 1996 (age 30)	(Japan) Albirex Niigata (S)	2020	2026
15	Syed Firdaus Hassan	(Singapore)	30 May 1998 (age 28)	(Singapore) Young Lions FC	2022	2023
16	Joel Chew ^{U23}	(Singapore)	9 February 2000 (age 26)	(Singapore) Young Lions FC	2022	2027
18	Rezza Rezky ^{U23}	(Singapore)	8 November 2000 (age 26)	(Singapore) Young Lions FC	2022	2023
20	Saifullah Akbar	(Singapore)	31 January 1999 (age 27)	(Singapore) Lion City Sailors	2023	2023
21	Firdaus Kasman ^{O30}	(Singapore)	24 January 1988 (age 38)	(Singapore) Geylang International	2022	2023
Forwards
9	Boris Kopitović	(Montenegro)	27 April 1995 (age 31)	(Montenegro) OFK Petrovac	2020	2023
13	Taufik Suparno	(Singapore) (Indonesia)	31 October 1995 (age 31)	(Singapore) Young Lions FC	2018	2023
30	Faris Ramli ^{O30}	(Singapore)	24 August 1992 (age 34)	(Singapore) Lion City Sailors	2023	2023
Players loaned out / left during season
5	Danish Irfan	(Singapore)	10 March 1999 (age 27)	(Singapore) Young Lions FC	2022	2023
70	Syazwan Latiff ^{U21}	(Singapore)	21 February 2006 (age 20)	(Singapore) Hougang United U17	2022	2023
Players on National Service
	Marc Ryan Tan ^{U23}	(Singapore)	8 January 2002 (age 24)	(Singapore) Young Lions FC	2021	2024
	Danial Iliya ^{U23}	(Singapore)	6 February 2003 (age 23)	(Singapore) Young Lions FC	2020	2025
	Iman Hakim ^{U23}	(Singapore)	9 March 2002 (age 24)	(Japan) Albirex Niigata (S)	2021	2025
	Andrew Aw ^{U23}	(Singapore)	29 March 2003 (age 23)	(Singapore) Young Lions FC	2020	2025
64	Ong Yu En ^{U21}	(Singapore)	3 October 2003 (age 23)	(Japan) Albirex Niigata (S)	2022	2023

=== Women (JSSL Tampines) ===
No.	Name	Nationality	Date of Birth (Age)	Last club	Contract Since	Contract End
Goalkeepers
1	Lutfiah Hannah	(Singapore)		(Singapore) Still Aerion Women	2023	2023
18	Hazel Lim Ya Ting	(Singapore)	3 March 2002 (age 24)	(Singapore) Balestier Khalsa Women	2023	2023
81	Alysha Nasrina	(Singapore)	23 October 2007 (age 19)	(Singapore) JSSL Youth	2022	2023
Defenders
2	Nur Sabrina	(Singapore)			2023	2023
3	Nur Iffah Amrin	(Singapore)	16 January 2003 (age 23)	(Singapore) Home United Women	2023	2023
12	Nur Darwisyah Hadi	(Singapore)		(Singapore) Royal Arion WFC	2023	2023
14	Nur Fathimah Syaakirah	(Singapore)	4 September 2004 (age 22)	(Singapore) Balestier Khalsa Women	2022	2022
96	Charis Han	(Singapore)	8 July 2007 (age 19)	(Singapore) JSSL Youth	2023	2023
	Nurhidayu Naszri*	(Singapore)	16 March 2004 (age 22)	(Singapore) Bussorah Youth Sports Club	2023	2023
Midfielders
5	Rabi'atul Ardawiyah	(Singapore)	19 September 2003 (age 23)	(Singapore) Tiong Bahru FC	2023	2023
8	Maia McCoy	(England)		(Singapore) JSSL Youth	2003	2003
10	Nur Azureen	(Singapore)		(Singapore) Balestier Khalsa Women	2023	2023
16	Erika Seah	(Singapore)		(Singapore) JSSL Youth	2023	2023
17	Eva Rushdina	(Singapore)			2022	2023
22	Nur Farhanah Ruhaizat	(Singapore)	26 July 1998 (age 28)	(Singapore) Still Aerion Women	2023	2023
23	Nur Afiqah Omar	(Singapore)	15 October 2001 (age 25)	(Singapore) Still Aerion Women	2023	2023
30	Nurul Atiqah	(Singapore)	26 September 2006 (age 20)	(Singapore) JSSL Youth	2023	2023
31	Nurul Aqilah	(Singapore)	24 January 2008 (age 18)	(Singapore) JSSL Youth	2023	2023
26	Anna Seng	(Singapore)		(Singapore) JSSL Youth	2023	2023
Forwards
4	Stephanie Gigette	(Singapore)	27 September 1998 (age 28)	(Singapore) Still Aerion Women	2023	2023
6	Mayvin	(Singapore)		(Singapore) JSSL Youth	2023	2023
7	Priscille Le Helloco	(France)		(Singapore) JSSL Youth	2023	2023
9	Zoe Breen	(Singapore)		(Singapore) JSSL Youth	2022	2023
11	Nahwah Aidilreza	(Singapore)	4 May 2007 (age 19)	(Singapore) JSSL Youth	2022	2023
27	Hannah Tasha	(Singapore)		(Singapore) JSSL Youth	2023	2023
Players who left during mid-season
15	Sofia Rodriguez	(Spain)			2023	2023
25	Sara Hayduchok	(Philippines) (United States)		(United States) Cairn University	2023	2023
44	Giselle Blumke	(Germany) (Brazil)		(Singapore) Mattar Sailors FC	2023	2023

*Nurhidayu Naszri was de-registered due to her long-term injury sustained while representing the nation, but still with the club while she continues her rehabilitation.

== Coaching staff ==
Position	Name	Ref.
Chairman	(Singapore) Desmond Ong	
General Manager	(Singapore) William Phang	
Men's Team
Head Coach	(Singapore) Gavin Lee	Sign extension till 2024
Assistant Coach; COE U21 Coach	(Singapore) Fahrudin Mustafić	
Assistant Coach; Head of Youth	(Singapore) Noh Rahman	
Goalkeeping Coach	(Singapore) William Phang	
Fitness Coach	(Singapore) Tan Guo Xiong	
Video Analyst	(Singapore) Nathaniel Tan	
Sports Trainer	(Singapore) Chong Wei Zhi (Singapore) Hannah Goh	
COE U17 Coach	(Indonesia) Budiyanto Mat Nanto	
COE U15 Coach	(Singapore) Masrezwan Masturi	
Physiotherapist	(Singapore) Trevor Lee (Singapore) John Wong	
Logistics Officer	(Singapore) Goh Koon Hiang	
Women's Team
Team Manager / Head Coach	(England) Joseph O'Sullivan	
Assistant Coach	(Singapore) Faizal	
Goalkeeper Coach	(Singapore) Rudy Benicio	
S&C Coach	(Singapore) Lewis Buffalo	
Elite Development Coach	(Singapore) Christian Chiang Moroni	
Physiotherapist	(Singapore) Natalie (Singapore) Rachel Soh	

== Transfers ==
=== In ===
Preseason

Position	Player	Transferred From	Team	Ref
GK	(Singapore) Ridhuan Barudin	(Singapore) Hougang United	First team	Free
GK	(Singapore) Hazel Lim Ya Ting	(Singapore) Balestier Khalsa (W)	Women	Free
GK	(Singapore) Lutfiah Hannah	(Singapore) Still Aerion (W)	Women	Free
DF	(Serbia) Miloš Zlatković	(Malta) Balzan	First team	Free
DF	(Singapore) Nurhidayu Naszri	(Singapore) Bussorah Youth SC	Women	Free
DF	(Singapore) Nur Darwisyah	(Singapore) Royal Arion WFC	Women	Free
DF	(Singapore) Nur Fathimah Syaakirah	(Singapore) Balestier Khalsa (W)	Women	Free
MF	(Singapore) Saifullah Akbar	(Singapore) Lion City Sailors	First team	Free
MF	(Germany) Giselle Blumke	(Singapore) Mattar Sailors (W)	Women	Free
MF	(Singapore) Nur Azureen	(Singapore) Balestier Khalsa (W)	Women	Free
MF	(Singapore) Nur Farhanah Ruhaizat	(Singapore) Still Aerion (W)	Women	Free
MF	(Singapore) Nur Afiqah Omar	(Singapore) Still Aerion (W)	Women	Free
MF	(Spain) Sofía Rodríguez	(England) Essex FA	Women	Free
FW	(Singapore) Faris Ramli	(Singapore) Lion City Sailors	First team	Free
FW	(Singapore) Glenn Kweh	(Singapore) Young Lions FC	First team	Free; 2 years contract till 2024 starting 2023
FW	(Singapore) Stephanie Gigette	(Singapore) Still Aerion (W)	Women	Free

Mid-season

Position	Player	Transferred From	Team	Ref

=== Loan Return ===
Preseason

Position	Player	Transferred From	Team	Ref
MF	(Singapore) Shah Shahiran	(Singapore) SAFSA	First Team	Completion of NS

Note 1: Shah Shahiran to return in Feb 2023 after completion of NS

Mid-season

Position	Player	Transferred From	Team	Ref
DF	(Singapore) Adam Reefdy	(Singapore) SAFSA	U21	Loan Return
DF	(Singapore) Hamizan Hisham	(Singapore) SAFSA	U21	Loan Return

=== Out ===
Preseason

Position	Player	Transferred To	Team	Ref
GK	(Singapore) Kevin Wong Jing Ren	(Singapore)	First Team	Free
DF	(Singapore) Shameer Aziq	(Singapore) Warwick Knights (SFL1)	First Team	Free
DF	(Singapore) Christopher van Huizen	(Singapore) Lion City Sailors	First Team	Free
DF	(Singapore) Irwan Shah	(Singapore) Hougang United	First Team	Free
MF	(Serbia) Zehrudin Mehmedovic	(North Macedonia) KF Gostivari (M1)	First Team	Free
MF	(Singapore) Amir Mirza	(Singapore) Lion City Sailors U21	U21	Free
MF	(Singapore) Ethan Henry Pinto	(Singapore) Young Lions FC	U21	Free
MF	(Singapore) Alyssha Hannah	(Singapore) Ayer Rajah Gryphon FC	Women	Free

Mid-season

Position	Player	Transferred To	Team	Ref
DF	(Germany) (Brazil) Giselle Blumke	(Netherlands) Amsterdamsche FC	Women	Free
MF	(Spain) Sofia Rodriguez	Free Agent	Women	Free
DF	(Philippines) (United States) Sara Hayduchok	(Singapore) Mattar Sailors (W)	Women	Free

=== Loan Out ===
Preseason

Position	Player	Transferred To	Team	Ref
MF	(Singapore) Marc Ryan Tan	(Singapore) SAFSA	First Team	NS till October 2024
GK	(Singapore) Danial Iliya	(Singapore) SAFSA	First Team	NS till February 2025
DF	(Singapore) Andrew Aw	(Singapore) SAFSA	U21	NS till February 2025
DF	(Singapore) Adam Reefdy	(Singapore) SAFSA	U21	NS till February 2025
MF	(Singapore) Iman Hakim	(Singapore) SAFSA	First Team	NS till February 2025

Mid-season

Position	Player	Transferred To	Team	Ref
DF	(Singapore) Danish Irfan	(Singapore) Geylang International	First Team	On Loan for the rest of the season
MF	(Singapore) Ong Yu En	(Singapore) SAFSA	First Team	NS till July 2025
MF	(Singapore) (India) Neel Manoj Nannat	(Singapore) SAFSA	U21	NS till July 2025

=== Extension and retained ===
First Team

Position	Player	Ref
Coach	(Singapore) Gavin Lee	6 years contract till 2028
GK	(Singapore) Danial Iliya	1-year contract till 2023 (Note: Extended & loan to GYL during NS)
GK	(Singapore) Syazwan Buhari	2 years contract from 2021 till 2023
DF	(Singapore) Ryaan Sanizal	2 years contract from 2021 till 2023
DF	(Singapore) Amirul Haikal	2 years contract from 2021 till 2023
DF	(Singapore) Irfan Najeeb	1-year contract till 2023
DF	(Japan) Shuya Yamashita	1-year contract till 2023
DF	(Singapore) Danish Irfan	1-year contract till 2023
MF	(Singapore) Yasir Hanapi	2 years contract till 2023
MF	(Singapore) Shah Shahiran	5 years contract from 2023 till 2027
MF	(Japan) Kyoga Nakamura	5 years contract from 2022 till 2026
MF	(Singapore) Syed Firdaus	1-year contract till 2023
MF	(Singapore) Joel Chew	5 years contract from 2023 till 2027
MF	(Singapore) Rezza Rezky	1-year contract till 2023
MF	(Singapore) Ong Yu En	1-year contract till 2023
MF	(Singapore) Firdaus Kasman	1-year contract till 2023
MF	(Singapore) Iman Hakim	3 years contract till 2025
FW	(Montenegro) Boris Kopitovic	1-year contract till 2023
FW	(Singapore) (Indonesia) Taufik Suparno	1-year contract till 2023

U21

Position	Player	Ref
GK	(Singapore) Jayden Khoo	1-year contract till 2023 (U21)
DF	(Singapore) Andrew Aw	3 years contract till 2025 (U21)
DF	(Singapore) Adam Reefdy	3 years contract till 2025 (U21)
DF	(Singapore) Adam Ali	1-year contract till 2023 (U21)
DF	(Singapore) (Bosnia and Herzegovina) Zeeshan Iskandar	1-year contract till 2023 (U21)
MF	(Singapore) Anton Yen Goh	1-year contract till 2023 (U21)
MF	(Singapore) (India) Neel Manoj Nannat	1-year contract till 2023 (U21)
MF	(Singapore) Yusril Hanapi	1-year contract till 2023 (U21)
FW	(Singapore) Ali Manaf	1-year contract till 2023 (U21)
FW	(Singapore) Syazwan Latiff	1-year contract till 2023 (U21)

== Friendlies ==
=== Pre-season ===
Win Draw Loss

Tampines Rovers

27 January 2023 1	Tampines Rovers (Singapore)	3–2	(Singapore) Balestier Khalsa	Tampines
	OG; Saifullah Akbar; Rezza Rezky			Stadium: Our Tampines Hub

2 February 2023 2	Albirex Niigata (S) (Japan)	3–2	(Singapore) Tampines Rovers	Jurong East
			Taufik Suparno; Ali Manaf	Stadium: Jurong East Stadium

10 February 2023 3	Lion City Sailors (Singapore)	2–2	(Singapore) Tampines Rovers	Bishan
	Abdul Rasaq; Kodai Tanaka		Boris Kopitović; Faris Ramli	Stadium: Bishan Stadium

16 February 2023 4	Tampines Rovers (Singapore)	3–4	(Malaysia) Sabah FC U23	Kota Kinabalu
	Joel Chew; Danish Irfan; Saifullah Akbar			Stadium: Likas Stadium

18 February 2023 5	Tampines Rovers (Singapore)	0–3	(Malaysia) Sabah FC	Kota Kinabalu
			Gabriel Peres 4' (pen.); Saddil Ramdani 26'; Darren Lok 63'	Stadium: Likas Stadium

JSSL Tampines Rovers

10 February 2023 1	JSSL Tampines Rovers (Singapore)	1–0	Singapore Women's U-19 National Team	Singapore
	Sofia Rodriguez			Stadium: HQ Arena

10 February 2023 1	JSSL Tampines Rovers (Singapore)	2–1	(Malaysia) Kelana United	Kuala Lumpur
	Nur Farhanah Ruhaizat			Stadium: Eco Ardence Setia Stadium

11 February 2023 2	JSSL Tampines Rovers (Singapore)	7–0	(Malaysia) Malacca Sports School	Kuala Lumpur
	Zoe Breen; Stephanie Dominguez; Priscille He Helloco; Nur Afiqah			Stadium: Eco Ardence Setia Stadium

19 February 2023 3	JSSL Tampines Rovers (Singapore)	7–0	(Singapore) Still Aerion	Woodleigh
	Giselle Blumke; Zoe Breen; Stephanie Gigette; Priscille Le Helloco; Nur Azureen			Stadium: The Arena

U21

26 February 2023 1	Tampines Rovers (Singapore)	2–0	(Singapore) Lion City Sailors	Tampines
	Joel Chew; Anton Yen Goh			Stadium: Our Tampines Hub

9 April 2023 2	Tampines Rovers (Singapore)	1–4	(Singapore) Hougang United	Jalan Besar
	Neel Manoj		Shafeeq Ameer	Stadium: Jalan Besar Stadium

=== In-season ===
U17

14 June 2023 1	Tampines Rovers (Singapore)	4–0	(Singapore) Woodlands Lions FC	Tampines
				Stadium: Our Tampines Hub

9 November 2023 2	Tampines Rovers (Singapore)	0–0	(Indonesia) Cibubur Youth Athlete SC	Tampines
				Stadium: Our Tampines Hub

JSSL Tampines Rovers

5 May 2023 1	JSSL Tampines Rovers (Singapore)	2–2	(Singapore) Hougang United	Clementi
	Nur Afiqah; Zoe Breen			Stadium: Clementi Stadium

10 August 2023 1	JSSL Tampines Rovers (Singapore)	9–2	National University of Singapore	Jurong
	Giselle Blumke; Stephanie Dominguez; Nahwah Aidilreza; Nur Fathimah Syaakirah; Anna Seng			Stadium: National University Singapore

Win Draw Loss

== Team statistics ==
=== Appearances and goals ===
12 Dec 2023

No.	Pos.	Player	SPL		Singapore Cup		AFC Cup		Total	
No.	Pos.	Player	Apps.	Goals	Apps.	Goals	Apps.	Goals	Apps.	Goals
4	DF	(Japan) Shuya Yamashita	23+1	1	7	1	1	0	32	2
7	MF	(Singapore) Yasir Hanapi	21	7	4	1	1	0	26	8
8	MF	(Singapore) Shah Shahiran	22	1	6	0	1	0	29	1
9	FW	(Montenegro) Boris Kopitović	22+1	17	7	4	1	2	31	23
10	MF	(Japan) Kyoga Nakamura	23	3	7	0	1	0	31	3
11	FW	(Singapore) Glenn Kweh	22+1	1	7	0	1	0	31	1
12	DF	(Singapore) Amirul Haikal	1+5	0	0	0	0	0	6	0
13	FW	(Singapore) Taufik Suparno	8+11	2	0	0	0	0	19	2
15	MF	(Singapore) Syed Firdaus Hassan	2+10	0	1+4	0	0	0	17	0
16	MF	(Singapore) Joel Chew	17+7	0	6	2	1	0	31	2
18	MF	(Singapore) Rezza Rezky	1+9	0	0+3	0	0	0	13	0
20	MF	(Singapore) Saifullah Akbar	9+12	1	5+2	1	0+1	0	29	2
21	MF	(Singapore) Firdaus Kasman	0+4	0	0+3	0	0	0	7	0
22	DF	(Singapore) Syahrul Sazali	0	0	0+1	0	0	0	1	0
23	DF	(Singapore) Irfan Najeeb	22	0	7	0	1	0	30	0
24	GK	(Singapore) Syazwan Buhari	21	0	7	0	1	0	29	0
30	FW	(Singapore) Faris Ramli	24	9	6+1	3	1	0	32	12
31	GK	(Singapore) Ridhuan Barudin	3+1	0	0	0	0	0	4	0
33	DF	(Serbia) Miloš Zlatković	16+2	1	6	1	1	0	25	1
45	DF	(Singapore) Hamizan Hisham	0	0	0	0	0	0	0	0
54	MF	(Singapore) Jovan Ang	0+1	0	0	0	0	0	1	0
55	DF	(Singapore) Kegan Phang Jun	0+1	1	0+1	0	0	0	2	1
58	MF	(Singapore) Caelan Cheong Tze Jay	0+1	0	0+2	0	0	0	3	0
60	MF	(Singapore) Matthias Josaphat Koesno	0+1	0	0+1	0	0	0	2	0
69	MF	(Singapore) Adam Reefdy	0+2	0	1+4	0	0	0	7	0
79	MF	(Singapore) Anton Yen Goh	0+1	0	0	0	0	0	1	0
Players who have played this season and/or sign for the season but had left the club or on loan to other club
5	DF	(Singapore) Danish Irfan	0	0	0	0	0	0	0	0
64	MF	(Singapore) Ong Yu En	3+7	2	0	0	0	0	10	2
73	DF	(Singapore) Ryaan Sanizal	3+8	1	0	0	0	0	11	1

== Competitions ==
=== Overview ===
As of 28 May 2023

Competition	Record							
Competition	P	W	D	L	GF	GA	GD	Win %
Singapore Premier League	24	14	6	4	47	32	+15	58.33
Singapore Cup	7	3	2	2	14	9	+5	42.86
AFC Cup	1	0	0	1	2	3	−1	0.00
Total	32	17	8	7	63	44	+19	53.13

Results summary (SPL)

Overall								Home						Away					
Pld	W	D	L	GF	GA	GD	Pts	W	D	L	GF	GA	GD	W	D	L	GF	GA	GD
22	13	5	4	42	29	+13	44	6	2	3	22	17	+5	7	3	1	20	12	+8

=== Singapore Premier League ===
Win Draw Loss

25 February 2023 1	Tampines Rovers (Singapore)	1–1	(Singapore) Geylang International	Tampines
	Faris Ramli 16'; Yasir Hanapi (yellow card) 37'; Irfan Najeeb (yellow card) 40'; Taufik Suparno (yellow card) 59'	Report	Vincent Bezecourt 2'; Joshua Pereira (yellow card) 17'; Amirul Adli (yellow card) 65'; Noor Ariff (yellow card) 78'	Stadium: Our Tampines Hub; Referee: Jansen Foo

3 March 2023 2	Tanjong Pagar United (Singapore)	0–2	(Singapore) Tampines Rovers	Jurong East
	Mirko Šugić (yellow card) 42'; Marin Mudrazija (yellow card) 61'; Naqiuddin Eunos (yellow card) 90+1'	Report	Faris Ramli 3'; Boris Kopitović 37'; Glenn Kweh (yellow card) 64'; Miloš Zlatković (yellow card) 78'; Saifullah Akbar (red card) 90+1'	Stadium: Jurong East Stadium; Referee: Farhad Mohamed

9 March 2023 3	Young Lions FC (Singapore)	0–3	(Singapore) Tampines Rovers	Jalan Besar
	Ilhan Noor (yellow card) 90'	Report	Taufik Suparno 31'; Faris Ramli 34'; Ong Yu En 82'; Kyoga Nakamura (yellow card) 49'; Syed Firdaus Hassan (yellow card) 79'	Stadium: Jalan Besar Stadium; Referee: Andrea Verolino

14 March 2023 4	Balestier Khalsa (Singapore)	1–3	(Singapore) Tampines Rovers	Bishan
	Daniel Goh 49'; Emmeric Ong (yellow card) 77'	Report	Faris Ramli 29'; Boris Kopitović 31' 77'; Yasir Hanapi (yellow card) 36'; Miloš Zlatković (yellow card) 38'; Syazwan Buhari (yellow card) 40'; Kyoga Nakamura (yellow card) 80'	Stadium: Bishan Stadium; Referee: Clarence Leow Hong Wei

19 March 2023 5	Albirex Niigata (S) (Japan)	0–1	(Singapore) Tampines Rovers	Jurong East
	Riku Fukashiro (yellow card) 74'; Tadanari Lee (yellow card) 87'	Report	Boris Kopitović 13'; Ong Yu En (yellow card) 58'; Shah Shahiran (yellow card) 87'	Stadium: Jurong East Stadium; Referee: Jansen Foo

31 March 2023 6	Tampines Rovers (Singapore)	4–3	(Singapore) Lion City Sailors	Tampines
	Yasir Hanapi 20'; Kyoga Nakamura 30'; Faris Ramli 50'; Taufik Suparno 72' (yellow card) 90+6'; Glenn Kweh (yellow card) 78'; Miloš Zlatković (yellow card) 90+5'	Report	Shawal Anuar 8'; Glenn Kweh 56' (o.g.); Manuel Herrera López 90+4' (yellow card) 79'; Maxime Lestienne (yellow card) 90+5'	Stadium: Our Tampines Hub; Referee: Mohd Taqi; Man of the Match: Kyoga Nakamura

16 April 2023 7	Hougang United (Singapore)	1–1	(Singapore) Tampines Rovers	Jalan Besar
	Hazzuwan Halim 62' (pen.); Nazrul Nazari (yellow card) 5'; Ajay Robson (yellow card) 66'; Zulfahmi Arifin (yellow card) 90+10'; Iryan Fandi (yellow card) 90+13'; Scott Starr (yellow card) 90+13'	Report	Boris Kopitović 90+15' (pen.); Shuya Yamashita (yellow card) 56'; Taufik Suparno (yellow card) 90'	Stadium: Jalan Besar Stadium; Referee: Jansen Foo; Man of the Match: Boris Kopitović

20 April 2023 8	Tampines Rovers (Singapore)	2–0	(Brunei) DPMM FC	Jalan Besar
	Ong Yu En 8'; Yasir Hanapi 10'; Kyoga Nakamura (yellow card) 31'	Report	Andrey Voronkov (penalty missed) 90; Martínez (yellow card) 13'; Hanif Farhan Azman (yellow card) 31'	Stadium: Jalan Besar Stadium (Note: OTH not available due to unplayable field); Referee: Farhad Mohamed

5 May 2023 9	Tampines Rovers (Singapore)	2–3	(Singapore) Balestier Khalsa	Tampines
	Boris Kopitović 67' (pen.) 90+9' (pen.); Faris Ramli (yellow card) 7'; Syed Firdaus Hassan (yellow card) 90+2'	Report	Daniel Goh 33'; Ryoya Tanigushi 51' 90+6'; Fabian Kwok (yellow card) 80'; Madhu Mohana (yellow card) 90+8'	Stadium: Our Tampines Hub; Referee: Taufik Tahana

14 May 2023 10	Tampines Rovers (Singapore)	3–0	(Singapore) Tanjong Pagar United	Tampines
	Boris Kopitović 24' (yellow card) 57'; Kyoga Nakamura 79'; Kegan Phang 90+4'	Report	Shakir Hamzah (yellow card) 33' (yellow-red card) 88'; Faizal Roslan (yellow card) 50'; Azim Akbar (yellow card) 82'	Stadium: Our Tampines Hub; Referee: Hilmi Fuad

20 May 2023 11	Tampines Rovers (Singapore)	1–0	(Singapore) Young Lions FC	Tampines
	Boris Kopitović 2'	Report		Stadium: Our Tampines Hub; Referee: Clarence Leow Hong Wei

28 May 2023 12 (Rescheduled)	DPMM FC (Brunei)	0–1	(Singapore) Tampines Rovers	Jalan Besar
	Ángel Martínez (yellow card) 5' (yellow-red card) 14'; Azwan Ali Rahman (yellow card) 10'; Abdul Azizi Ali Rahman (yellow card) 14'; Fakharrazi Hassan (yellow card) 36'	Report	Boris Kopitović 55'; Shuya Yamashita (yellow card) 14'; Firdaus Kasman (yellow card) 85'	Stadium: Jalan Besar Stadium (Note: Hassanal Bolkiah National Stadium unavailable due to ongoing renovations.); Referee: Jansen Foo

7 June 2023 13	Lion City Sailors (Singapore)	1–1	(Singapore) Tampines Rovers	Bishan
	Maxime Lestienne 84' (pen.); Hariss Harun (yellow card) 62'	Report	Faris Ramli 58'; Yasir Hanapi (yellow card) 26' (yellow-red card) 62'; Miloš Zlatković (yellow card) 83'	Stadium: Bishan Stadium; Referee: Mohd Taqi

10 June 2023 14	Tampines Rovers (Singapore)	2–0	(Singapore) Hougang United	Tampines
	Boris Kopitović 68' (pen.); Shuya Yamashita 85'; Saifullah Akbar (yellow card) 45+2'	Report	Jordan Nicolas Vestering (yellow card) 45+1'; Ajay Robson (yellow card) 61'; Fairoz Hasan (red card) 90+1'	Stadium: Our Tampines Hub; Referee: Clarence Leow Hong Wei

27 June 2023 15	Tampines Rovers (Singapore)	1–1	(Japan) Albirex Niigata FC (S)	Tampines
	Boris Kopitović 53' (pen.); Shah Shahiran (yellow card) 63'; Yasir Hanapi (yellow card) 90+4'	Report	Tadanari Lee 79'; Hassan Sunny (red card) 45+3'; Koki Kawachi (yellow card) 47'; Kaisei Ogawa (yellow card) 58'; Riku Fukashiro (yellow card) 89'	Stadium: Our Tampines Hub; Referee: Farhan Mohamed

2 July 2023 16	Geylang International (Singapore)	1–1	(Singapore) Tampines Rovers	Tampines
	Vincent Bezecourt 17'; Yushi Yamaya (yellow card) 90+3'	Report	Boris Kopitović 16'	Stadium: Our Tampines Hub; Referee: Taufik Thana

6 July 2023 17	Hougang United (Singapore)	0–1	(Singapore) Tampines Rovers	Jalan Besar
	Gabriel Quak (yellow card) 27'; Ajay Robson (yellow card) 36'	Report	Boris Kopitović 45+1'; Faris Ramli (yellow card) 74'	Stadium: Jalan Besar Stadium; Referee: Ahmad A'qashah

11 July 2023 18	Tampines Rovers (Singapore)	2–1	(Singapore) Tanjong Pagar United	Tampines
	Boris Kopitović 73' (pen.) (yellow card) 90+5'; Faris Ramli 78'; Kyoga Nakamura (yellow card) 90+3'	Report	Syukri Bashir 73'; Blake Ricciuto (yellow card) 35'; Azim Akbar (yellow card) 48'; Kenji Syed Rusydi (yellow card) 70'	Stadium: Our Tampines Hub; Referee: Andrea Verolino

15 July 2023 19	Young Lions FC (Singapore)	2–3	(Singapore) Tampines Rovers	Jalan Besar
	Syahadat Masnawi 41'; Fairuz Fazli Koh 71'; Harith Kanadi (yellow card) 65'; Jared Gallagher (yellow card) 89'	Report	Yasir Hanapi 18' 62'; Faris Ramli 62'; Syazwan Buhari (red card) 48'; Ryaan Sanizal (yellow card) 90+3'	Stadium: Jalan Besar Stadium; Referee: Jansen Foo

22 July 2023 20	Tampines Rovers (Singapore)	2–3	(Singapore) Geylang International	Tampines
	Yasir Hanapi 61' (pen.) 83'; Shuya Yamashita (yellow card) 18'; Irfan Najeeb (yellow card) 31' (red card) 51'	Report	Akmal Azman 35' (yellow card) 54'; Yushi Yamaya 53'; Rio Sakuma 90+7'; Iqbal Hussain (yellow card) 59'; Fadli Kamis (yellow card) 81'; Ahmad Syahir (yellow card) 90+1'; Amirul Adli (yellow card) 90+5'	Stadium: Our Tampines Hub; Referee: Ahmad A'qashah; Man of the Match: Joshua Pereira

28 July 2023 21	Albirex Niigata (S) (Japan)	6–3	(Singapore) Tampines Rovers	Jurong East
	Seia Kunori 1' 4' (penalty missed) 8 Tadanari Lee 29'; Shunsaku Kishimoto 34'; Shodai Yokoyama (yellow card) 45+7'; Ryo Takahashi 82'; Keito Komatsu 83'	Report	Yasir Hanapi 19' (pen.) (yellow card) 60'; Ryaan Sanizal 26' (yellow card) 40'; Faris Ramli 69'	Stadium: Jurong East Stadium; Referee: Jansen Foo

4 August 2023 22	Tampines Rovers (Singapore)	2–5	(Singapore) Lion City Sailors	Tampines
	Miloš Zlatković 59'; Boris Kopitović 73' (pen.)	Report	Maxime Lestienne 9' 19' 34'; Richairo Zivkovic 77' 80'; Lionel Tan (yellow card) 22'; Bailey Wright (yellow card) 69'	Stadium: Our Tampines Hub; Referee: Farhad Mohamed; Man of the Match: Maxime Lestienne

18 August 2023 23	Tampines Rovers (Singapore)	2–2	(Brunei) DPMM FC	Tampines
	Boris Kopitović 19'; Saifullah Akbar 71'; Glenn Kweh (yellow card) 79'; Shah Shahiran (yellow card) 86'; Faris Ramli (yellow card) 90+6'	Report	Farshad Noor 56'; Nazirrudin Ismail 74'; Hendra Azam Idris (yellow card) 90'	Stadium: Our Tampines Hub; Referee: Clarence Leow Hong Wei

15 September 2023 24 (Rescheduled)	Balestier Khalsa (Singapore)	1–3	(Singapore) Tampines Rovers	Bishan
	Ryoya Tanigushi 88' (penalty missed) 29; Jordan Emaviwe (yellow card) 59'; Ignatius Ang (yellow card) 61'; Darren Teh (yellow card) 90'	Report	Glenn Kweh 71'; Kyoga Nakamura 90+1'; Shah Shahiran 90+4'; Miloš Zlatković (yellow card) 64'	Stadium: Bishan Stadium; Referee: Mohd Taqi

Pos	Team	Pld	W	D	L	GF	GA	GD	Pts	Qualification or relegation
1	Albirex Niigata (S) (Note: Three clubs – Albirex Niigata (S), DPMM FC and the FAS under-23 team Young Lions, are ineligible for any AFC competition spots.) (C)	24	20	2	2	86	20	+66	62	
2	Lion City Sailors (Q)	24	17	3	4	79	39	+40	54	Qualification for 2024-25 AFC Champions League Two Group Stage & ASEAN Club Championship
3	Tampines Rovers (Q)	24	14	6	4	47	32	+15	48	Qualification for 2024-25 AFC Champions League Two Group Stage
4	Balestier Khalsa	24	12	0	12	60	71	−11	36	
5	Geylang International	24	10	3	11	41	52	−11	33	
6	Hougang United	24	9	2	13	37	57	−20	29	
7	Brunei DPMM	24	6	5	13	39	43	−4	23	
8	Tanjong Pagar United	24	6	3	15	39	62	−23	21	
9	Young Lions	24	1	2	21	24	76	−52	5	

Source: Singapore Premier League
Rules for classification: 1) points; 2) goal difference; 3) number of goals scored; 4) number of wins
(C) Champions; (Q) Qualified for the phase indicated

=== AFC Cup ===
Win Draw Loss

==== Play-off ====
23 August 2023 Play-off	Tampines Rovers (Singapore)	2–3	(Cambodia) Phnom Penh Crown FC	Jalan Besar, Singapore
	Boris Kopitović 10' 25'	Report	Yudai Ogawa 44'; Andrés Nieto 52'; Shintaro Shimizu 53'	Stadium: Jalan Besar Stadium; Referee: Salim Said Al Majaraf (Oman)

=== Singapore Cup ===
Win Draw Loss

Pos	Team	Pld	W	D	L	GF	GA	GD	Pts	Qualification
1	Brunei DPMM (Q)	4	3	1	0	7	2	+5	10	Semi-finals
2	Tampines Rovers (Q)	4	2	1	1	9	3	+6	7	Semi-finals
3	Albirex Niigata (S)	4	1	2	1	5	4	+1	5	
4	Geylang International	4	1	0	3	6	12	−6	3	
5	Young Lions	4	1	0	3	4	10	−6	3	

Updated to match(es) played on 29 September 2023. Source: FAS
(Q) Qualified for the phase indicated

24 September 2023 Group Match 1	Tampines Rovers (Singapore)	5–0	(Singapore) Young Lions FC	Tampines
	Shuya Yamashita 50'; Yasir Hanapi 64'; Boris Kopitović (penalty missed) 45+10 82'; Faris Ramli 85' 90+1'; Kyoga Nakamura (yellow card) 36'; Shah Shahiran (yellow card) 60'	Report	Aqil Yazid (yellow card) 28'; Nazri Nasir (yellow card) 45+10'; Harhys Stewart (yellow card) 83'; Syahadat Masnawi (yellow card) 85'	Stadium: Our Tampines Hub; Referee: Farhad Mohamed

29 September 2023 Group Match 2	Brunei DPMM	1–0	(Singapore) Tampines Rovers	Jalan Besar
	Farshad Noor 63' (pen.) (yellow card) 83'; Hanif Hamir (yellow card) 68'; Kristijan Naumovski (yellow card) 90+2'	Report	Yasir Hanapi (yellow card) 17'; Miloš Zlatković (yellow card) 54'; Fahrudin Mustafić (yellow card) 89'	Stadium: Jalan Besar Stadium; Referee: Ahmad A'qashah

4 November 2023 Group Match 3	Tampines Rovers (Singapore)	3–1	(Singapore) Geylang International	Tampines
	Saifullah Akbar 34' (yellow card) 48'; Miloš Zlatković 49'; Joel Chew 57'; Shuya Yamashita (yellow card) 65'; Yasir Hanapi (red card) 68'; Faris Ramli (yellow card) 74'; Fahrudin Mustafić (yellow card) 84'	Report	Takahiro Tezuka 39'; Arshad Shamim (yellow card) 6'; Yushi Yamaya (yellow card) 90+4'	Stadium: Our Tampines Hub; Referee: Jansen Foo

26 November 2023 Group Match 4	Tampines Rovers (Singapore)	1–1	(Japan) Albirex Niigata (S)	Jurong East
	Koki Kawachi 68'; Tadanari Lee (yellow card) 73'; Ryo Takahashi (yellow card) 83'	Report	Boris Kopitović 79' (pen.) (yellow card) 83'	Stadium: Jurong East Stadium; Referee: Ahmad A'qashah

3 December 2023 Semi Final Leg 1	Tampines Rovers (Singapore)	3–3	(Singapore) Lion City Sailors	Our Tampines Hub
	Joel Chew 3'; Faris Ramli 43'; Boris Kopitović 81'	Report	Anumanthan Kumar 6'; Bailey Wright 13'; Shawal Anuar 52'; Lionel Tan (yellow card) 33'; Zulqarnaen Suzliman (yellow card) 45'; Rusyaidi Salime (yellow card) 89'	Attendance: Tampines; Referee: Muhammad Taqi

6 December 2023 Semi Final Leg 2	Lion City Sailors (Singapore)	3–0	(Singapore) Tampines Rovers	Bishan
	Richairo Zivkovic 2', 59'; Diego Lopes 66'; Anumanthan Kumar (yellow card) 51'	Report	Miloš Zlatković (yellow card) 25'; Shah Shahiran (yellow card) 26' (yellow-red card) 90+1'; Irfan Najeeb (yellow card) 65'	Stadium: Bishan Stadium; Referee: Farhad Mohamed

Lion City Sailors won 6–3 on aggregate.

9 December 2023 3rd/4th	Brunei DPMM	0–2	(Singapore) Tampines Rovers	Jalan Besar
	Hakeme Yazid Said (yellow card) 60' (yellow-red card) 88'; Abdul Azizi Ali Rahman (yellow card) 81'	Report	Boris Kopitović 10'; Faris Ramli 31'	Stadium: Jalan Besar Stadium; Referee: Clarence Leow Hong Wei

== Competition (Women's Premier League) ==
=== Women's Premier League ===
Win Draw Loss

18 March 2023 1	Geylang International (Singapore)	0–8	(Singapore) JSSL Tampines	Choa Chu Kang
			Nur Azureen; Giselle Blumke; Nur Afiqah; Farhana Ruhaizat (pen.); Nahwah; Nahwah; Priscille Le Helloco	Stadium: Choa Chu Kang Stadium

25 March 2023 2	JSSL Tampines (Singapore)	0–2	(Singapore) Hougang United	Yishun
			Asyiqin Razali; Raudhah Kamis	Stadium: Yishun Stadium

21 May 2023 3	Lion City Sailors (Singapore)	1–0	(Singapore) JSSL Tampines	Choa Chu Kang
	Paula Druschke			Stadium: Choa Chu Kang Stadium

27 May 2023 4	JSSL Tampines (Singapore)	0–1	(Singapore) Police SA	Choa Chu Kang
			Angelina Sarka	Stadium: Choa Chu Kang Stadium

18 June 2023 5	Still Aerion (Singapore)	1–2	(Singapore) JSSL Tampines	Choa Chu Kang
	Janine Lim Jia Jia		Nur Afiqah; Stephanie Dominguez	Stadium: Choa Chu Kang Stadium

24 June 2023 6	Tiong Bahru FC (Singapore)	1–6	(Singapore) JSSL Tampines	Choa Chu Kang
	Agatha Widjaya		Nur Afiqah; Zoe Breen; Sara Hayduchok; Nahwah Aidilreza	Stadium: Choa Chu Kang Stadium

23 July 2023 7	JSSL Tampines (Singapore)	0–4	(Singapore) Tanjong Pagar United	Choa Chu Kang
	Nur Afiqah (red card) 1'			Stadium: Choa Chu Kang Stadium

29 July 2023 8	Albirex Niigata (Japan)	4–1	(Singapore) JSSL Tampines	Choa Chu Kang
			Farhanah Ruhaizat	Stadium: Choa Chu Kang Stadium

6 August 2023 9	JSSL Tampines (Singapore)	1–1	(Singapore) Balestier Khalsa	Choa Chu Kang
	Farhanah Ruhaizat			Stadium: Choa Chu Kang Stadium

13 August 2023 10	JSSL Tampines (Singapore)	0–1	(Singapore) Geylang International	Yishun
			Noridah Abdullah	Stadium: Yishun Stadium

19 August 2023 11	Hougang United (Singapore)	2–0	(Singapore) JSSL Tampines	Yishun
				Stadium: Yishun Stadium

27 August 2023 12	JSSL Tampines (Singapore)	1–6	(Singapore) Lion City Sailors	Choa Chu Kang
	82'		Cara Chang 1', 41'; Josephine Ang Kaile 39'; Nur Izzati Rosni 51' (pen.); Lila Tan 61'; Ernie Sulastri 89'	Stadium: Choa Chu Kang Stadium

14 October 2023 13 (Rescheduled)	Police SA (Singapore)	2–3	(Singapore) JSSL Tampines	Choa Chu Kang
			Nur Azureen Zoe Breen Farhanah Ruhaizat	Stadium: Choa Chu Kang Stadium

29 October 2023 14 (Rescheduled)	JSSL Tampines (Singapore)	0–1	(Singapore) Still Aerion	Choa Chu Kang
				Stadium: Choa Chu Kang Stadium

21 October 2023 15	JSSL Tampines (Singapore)	10–0	(Singapore) Tiong Bahru FC	Choa Chu Kang
	Priscille Le Helloco; Farhanah Ruhaizat; Stephanie Dominguez; Zoe Breen; Nur Afiqah			Stadium: Choa Chu Kang Stadium

5 November 2023 16	Tanjong Pagar United (Singapore)	6–0	(Singapore) JSSL Tampines	Choa Chu Kang
				Stadium: Choa Chu Kang Stadium

19 November 2023 17	JSSL Tampines (Singapore)	3–3	(Japan) Albirex Niigata	Choa Chu Kang
	Priscille Le Helloco; Anna Seng			Stadium: Choa Chu Kang Stadium

26 November 2023 18	Balestier Khalsa (Singapore)	3–1	(Singapore) JSSL Tampines	Choa Chu Kang
			Zoe Breen	Stadium: Choa Chu Kang Stadium

League table

Pos	Team	Pld	W	D	L	GF	GA	GD	Pts	Qualification or relegation
1	Lion City Sailors	12	11	1	0	45	2	+43	34	League champions
2	(Japan) Albirex Niigata (S)	12	9	3	0	56	8	+48	30	
3	Hougang United	12	8	2	2	23	3	+20	26	
4	Police SA	12	6	4	2	21	12	+9	22	
5	Tanjong Pagar United	12	6	3	3	36	10	+26	21	
6	JSSL Tampines	12	3	1	8	19	24	−5	10	
7	Still Aerion	12	3	1	8	12	22	−10	10	
8	Balestier Khalsa	12	3	1	8	21	40	−19	10	
9	Geylang International	12	2	0	10	6	56	−50	6	
10	Tiong Bahru	12	1	0	11	7	69	−62	3	

Updated to match(es) played on 1 October 2022. Source: FAS
