= 2022 Tampines Rovers FC season =

Tampines Rovers FC
2022 season
- Chairman: Desmond Ong
- Coach: Gavin Lee
- Ground: Our Tampines Hub
Home colours	Away colours

The 2022 season is Tampines Rovers's 27th season at the top level of Singapore football and 77th year in existence as a football club. The club will also compete in the Singapore League Cup, the Singapore Cup, and the AFC Cup.

== Squad ==
=== Singapore Premier League ===
As of Oct 21, 2021

No.	Name	Nationality	Date of birth (age)	Last club	Contract Since	Contract End
Goalkeepers
16	Kevin Wong Jing Ren ^{U23}	(Singapore)	17 January 2000 (age 26)	Singapore Sports School	2022	2022
24	Syazwan Buhari	(Singapore)	22 September 1992 (age 34)	(Singapore) Geylang International	2018	2023
31	Danial Iliya ^{U21}	(Singapore)	6 February 2003 (age 23)	(Singapore) FFA U16	2020	2022
Defenders
3	Ryaan Sanizal ^{U23}	(Singapore)	31 May 2002 (age 24)	(Singapore) FFA U16	2019	2023
4	Shuya Yamashita	(Japan)	16 April 1999 (age 27)	(Japan) Albirex Niigata (S)	2022	2022
5	Danish Irfan ^{U23}	(Singapore)	10 March 1999 (age 27)	(Singapore) Young Lions FC	2022	2022
11	Shameer Aziq	(Singapore)	30 December 1995 (age 30)	(Singapore) Warriors FC	2022	2022
12	Amirul Haikal ^{U23}	(Singapore)	11 October 1999 (age 27)	(Singapore) Young Lions FC	2021	2023
17	Irwan Shah ^{>30}	(Singapore)	2 November 1988 (age 37)	(Singapore) Warriors FC	2016	2022
23	Irfan Najeeb ^{U23}	(Singapore)	31 July 1999 (age 27)	(Singapore) Young Lions FC	2021	2022
	Syahrul Sazali	(Singapore)	3 June 1998 (age 28)	(Singapore) Young Lions FC	2022	2022
Midfielders
6	Iman Hakim ^{U23}	(Singapore)	9 March 2002 (age 24)	(Japan) Albirex Niigata (S)	2021	2022
7	Yasir Hanapi (Captain) ^{>30}	(Singapore)	21 June 1989 (age 37)	(Malaysia) PDRM FA	2018	2023
8	Kyoga Nakamura	(Japan)	25 April 1996 (age 30)	(Japan) Albirex Niigata (S)	2020	2026
10	Milos Zlatkovic	(Japan)	15 March 1998 (age 28)	(Serbia) FK Mladost Lučani	2019	2022
15	Syed Firdaus Hassan	(Singapore)	30 May 1998 (age 28)	(Singapore) Young Lions FC	2022	2022
18	Rezza Rezky ^{U23}	(Singapore)	8 November 2000 (age 25)	(Singapore) Young Lions FC	2022	2022
19	Joel Chew ^{U23}	(Singapore)	9 February 2000 (age 26)	(Singapore) Young Lions FC	2022	2027
21	Firdaus Kasman ^{>30}	(Singapore)	24 January 1988 (age 38)	(Singapore) Geylang International	2022	2022
22	Christopher van Huizen	(Singapore)	28 November 1992 (age 33)	(Singapore) Geylang International	2022	2022
32	Ong Yu En ^{U23}	(Singapore)	3 October 2003 (age 23)	(Japan) Albirex Niigata (S)	2022	2022
Forwards
9	Boris Kopitović	(Montenegro)	27 April 1995 (age 31)	(Montenegro) OFK Petrovac	2020	2022
13	Taufik Suparno	(Singapore)	31 October 1995 (age 30)	(Singapore) SAFSA	2018	2022
Players loaned out / left during season
14	Marc Ryan Tan ^{U23}	(Singapore)	8 January 2002 (age 24)	(Singapore) Young Lions FC	2021	2022

=== Women (JSSL Tampines) ===
As of Oct 2, 2021

No.	Name	Nationality	Date of birth (age)	Last club	Contract Since	Contract End
Goalkeepers
24	Siti Nor Milah	(Singapore)			2022	2022
30	Alysha Nasrina	(Singapore)	23 October 2007 (age 18)		2022	2022
40	Nurul Atiqah	(Singapore)	22 September 2006 (age 20)		2022	2022
Defenders
4	Nicole Tan	(Singapore)			2022	2022
5	Andria Chen	(Singapore)			2022	2022
12	Siti Nur Ahzliyana	(Singapore)			2022	2022
16	Hannah Collins	(United States)			2022	2022
19	Mimi Ahmad	(Singapore)			2022	2022
20	Erika Seah	(Singapore)			2022	2022
Midfielders
2	Nur Sabrina	(Singapore)			2022	2023
3	Nur Qistina	(Singapore)			2022	2022
8	Caroline Collins	(United States)			2022	2022
10	Erryn Alyssa	(Singapore)			2022	2022
17	Eva Rushdina	(Singapore)			2022	2023
18	Alyssha Hannah	(Singapore)			2022	2022
27	Lear Ng	(Singapore)			2022	2022
Forwards
6	Zoe Breen	(England)			2022	2023
9	Afiqah Asari	(Singapore)			2022	2022
11	Nahwah Aidilreza	(Singapore)	4 May 2007 (age 19)		2022	2023

Signed for 2023 Season

No.	Name	Nationality	Date of birth (age)	Last club	Contract Since	Contract End
Goalkeepers
	Hazel Lim Ya Ting	(Singapore)	3 March 2002 (age 24)	(Singapore) Balestier Khalsa	2023	2023
	Lutfiah Hannah	(Singapore)		(Singapore) Still Aerion Women	2023	2023
Defenders
	Nurhidayu Naszri	(Singapore)	16 March 2004 (age 22)	(Singapore) Bussorah Youth Sports Club	2023	2023
	Nur Darwisyah	(Singapore)		(Singapore) Royal Arion WFC	2023	2023
	Nur Fathimah Syaakirah	(Singapore)		(Singapore) Balestier Khalsa	2022	2022
Midfielders
	Nur Azureen	(Singapore)		(Singapore) Balestier Khalsa	2023	2023
	Nur Farhanah Ruhaizat	(Singapore)	26 July 1998 (age 28)	(Singapore) Still Aerion Women	2023	2023
	Nur Afiqah Omar	(Singapore)	15 October 2001 (age 25)	(Singapore) Still Aerion Women	2023	2023
	Sofía Rodríguez	(Spain)		(England) Essex FA	2023	2023
8	Giselle Blumke	(Germany) (Brazil)		(Singapore) Mattar City Sailors	2023	2023
Forwards
	Stephanie Gigette	(Singapore)	27 September 1998 (age 28)	(Singapore) Still Aerion Women	2023	2023
	Priscille Le Helloco	(France)		Youth Team	2023	2023

== Coaching staff ==
Position	Name	Ref.
Chairman	(Singapore) Desmond Ong	
General Manager	(Singapore) William Phang	
Head Coach	(Singapore) Gavin Lee	Sign extension till 2024
Assistant Coach; Head of Youth; COE U21 Coach	(Singapore) Fahrudin Mustafić	
Goalkeeping Coach	(Singapore) William Phang	
COE U17 Coach	(Singapore) Hamqaamal Shah	
COE Goalkeeping Coach; Video Analyst	(Singapore) Ng Wei Xian	
Physiotherapist	(Singapore) Trevor Lee (Singapore) V. Surendran	
Logistics Officer	(Singapore) Goh Koon Hiang	

== Transfers ==
=== In ===
Preseason

Position	Player	Transferred From	Ref
GK	(Singapore) Sunny Tia	(Japan) Albirex Niigata (S)	Free
DF	(Japan) Shuya Yamashita	(Japan) Albirex Niigata (S)	Free
DF	(Singapore) Danish Irfan	(Singapore) Geylang International	Free
DF	(Singapore) Shameer Aziq	Free agent	Free
MF	(Singapore) Ong Yu En	(Japan) Albirex Niigata (S)	Free
MF	(Singapore) Christopher van Huizen	(Singapore) Geylang International	Free
MF	(Singapore) Firdaus Kasman	(Singapore) Geylang International	Free
MF	(Singapore) Syed Firdaus Hassaan	Free agent	Free
FW	(Singapore) Ali Manaf	(Japan) Albirex Niigata (S) U21	Free

Mid-season

Position	Player	Transferred From	Ref
MF	(Singapore) Rezza Rezky	(Singapore) Young Lions FC	Free

=== Loan Return ===
Preseason

Position	Player	Transferred From	Ref
MF	(Singapore) Joel Chew	(Singapore) Young Lions	End of NS
DF	(Singapore) Syahrul Sazali	(Singapore) Young Lions	End of NS

Note 1:

=== Out ===
Preseason

Position	Player	Transferred To	Ref
GK	(Singapore) Zulfairuuz Rudy	(Singapore) Geylang International	Free
DF	(Singapore) Daniel Bennett	(Singapore) Tanjong Pagar United	Free
DF	(Singapore) Baihakki Khaizan	NA	Retired
DF	(Singapore) Madhu Mohana	(Singapore) Balestier Khalsa	Free
MF	(Singapore) Haziq Jalal	(Singapore) Tanjong Pagar United U21	Free
MF	(Singapore) Huzaifah Aziz	(Singapore) Geylang International	Free
FW	(Montenegro) Armin Bosnjak	(Montenegro) FK Jezero (M1)	Free
FW	(Singapore) Fazrul Nawaz	(Singapore) Warwick Knights (SFL)	Free
FW	(Singapore) Danish Siregar	(Singapore) Geylang International U21	Free
FW	(Singapore) (England) Max McCoy	(Singapore) Balestier Khalsa U21	Free

=== Loan Out ===
Position	Player	Transferred To	Ref
DF	(Singapore) Syahrul Sazali	(Singapore) SAFSA	NS till 2022
MF	(Singapore) Joel Chew	(Singapore) SAFSA	NS till Sept 2022
DF	(Singapore) Hamizan Hisham	(Singapore) SAFSA	NS till 2023
MF	(Singapore) Shah Shahiran	(Singapore) SAFSA	NS till 2023
MF	(Singapore) Nicky Melvin Singh	(Japan) Albirex Niigata (S)	Season loan till 2022

Mid-season

Position	Player	Transferred To	Ref
MF	(Singapore) Marc Ryan Tan	(Singapore) SAFSA	NS till October 2024

=== Extension and retained ===
Position	Player	Ref
Coach	(Singapore) Gavin Lee	3 years contract till 2024
GK	(Singapore) Syazwan Buhari	2 years contract till 2023
GK	(Singapore) Danial Iliya	1 year contract till 2022 (Promoted)
DF	(Singapore) Ryaan Sanizal	2 years contract till 2023
DF	(Singapore) Irfan Najeeb	1 year contract till 2022
DF	(Singapore) Irwan Shah	1 year contract till 2022
DF	(Singapore) Amirul Haikal	2 years contract till 2023
DF	(Singapore) Andrew Aw	1 year contract till 2022 (U21)
DF	(Singapore) Adam Reefdy	1 year contract till 2022 (U21)
MF	(Singapore) Amir Mirza	1 year contract till 2022 (U21)
MF	(Singapore) Ethan Henry Pinto	1 year contract till 2022 (U21)
MF	(Singapore) Iman Hakim	1 year contract till 2022
MF	(Singapore) Marc Ryan Tan	1 year contract till 2022
MF	(Singapore) Yasir Hanapi	2 years contract till 2023
MF	(Japan) Kyoga Nakamura	5 years contract till 2026 starting 2022
MF	(Serbia) Zehrudin Mehmedovic	1 year contract till 2022
MF	(Singapore) Shah Shahiran	5 years contract till 2027 starting 2023
MF	(Singapore) Joel Chew	5 years contract till 2027 starting 2023
FW	(Singapore) Taufik Suparno	1 year contract till 2022
FW	(Montenegro) Boris Kopitovic	1 year contract till 2022

Note 1: Shah Shahiran currently with Young Lions due to his NS commitments.

== Friendlies ==
=== Pre-season ===
Win Draw Loss

15 January 2022 1	Tampines Rovers (Singapore)	3–2	(Singapore) Tanjong Pagar United	Tampines
	Christopher van Huizen; Taufik Suparno; Boris Kopitović	Report	Raihan Rahman; Mirko Sugic (pen.)	Stadium: Our Tampines Hub

15 January 2022 2	Tampines Rovers (Singapore)	5–1	(Singapore) Tanjong Pagar United	Tampines
	Ong Yu En; Amirul Haikal; Jovan Ang; Matthias Koesno	Report	Goal	Stadium: Our Tampines Hub

28 January 2022 3	Tampines Rovers (Singapore)	4–3	(Singapore) Geylang International	Tampines
	Boris Kopitović 40'; Irfan Najeeb 45'; Shameer Aziq 93'; Ong Yu En (pen.)	Report	Sime Zuzul 45'	Stadium: Our Tampines Hub

12 February 2022 4	Tampines Rovers (Singapore)	0–0	(Japan) Albirex Niigata (S)	Jalan Besar
		Report		Stadium: Jalan Besar Stadium

=== In-season ===
Win Draw Loss

1 May 2022 1	Tanjong Pagar United (Singapore)	1–2	(Singapore) Tampines Rovers	Jurong East
	Goal		Taufik Suparno; Matthias Josaphat Koesno	Stadium: Jurong East Stadium

11 June 2022 2	Johor Darul Ta'zim II (Malaysia)	1–0	(Singapore) Tampines Rovers	Johor Bahru
	1'			Stadium: Tan Sri Dato' Haji Hassan Yunos Stadium

== Team statistics ==
=== Appearances and goals ===
19 Nov 2022

No.	Pos.	Player	SPL		Singapore Cup		AFC Cup		Total	
No.	Pos.	Player	Apps.	Goals	Apps.	Goals	Apps.	Goals	Apps.	Goals
3	DF	(Singapore) Ryaan Sanizal	21+4	0	4	0	2	0	31	0
4	DF	(Japan) Shuya Yamashita	26+1	2	6	0	2	0	35	2
6	MF	(Singapore) Iman Hakim	6+3	0	0	0	0	0	9	0
7	MF	(Singapore) Yasir Hanapi	24+1	6	6	2	2	0	33	8
8	MF	(Japan) Kyoga Nakamura	28	5	6	2	2	0	36	7
9	FW	(Montenegro) Boris Kopitović	28	35	5	5	2	1	35	41
10	MF	(Serbia) Zehrudin Mehmedović	18+6	7	3+2	2	2	1	31	10
11	DF	(Singapore) Shameer Aziq	0+5	0	0+1	0	0	0	6	0
12	DF	(Singapore) Amirul Haikal	17+5	0	5	0	1+1	0	29	0
13	FW	(Singapore) Taufik Suparno	22+5	12	5+1	3	1+1	0	35	15
15	MF	(Singapore) Syed Firdaus Hassan	12+9	0	4+2	0	0+2	0	29	0
17	DF	(Singapore) Irwan Shah	14+13	0	1+4	0	1+1	0	34	0
18	MF	(Singapore) Rezza Rezky	0+1	0	0+3	0	0	0	4	0
19	MF	(Singapore) Joel Chew	0+3	1	2+4	1	0	0	9	2
21	MF	(Singapore) Firdaus Kasman	10+14	2	2+1	0	1+1	0	29	2
22	MF	(Singapore) Christopher van Huizen	13+7	3	1+5	0	1	0	27	3
23	DF	(Singapore) Irfan Najeeb	19+3	0	6	1	2	0	30	1
24	GK	(Singapore) Syazwan Buhari	28	0	6	0	2	0	36	0
31	GK	(Singapore) Danial Iliya	0+1	0	0+1	0	0	0	2	0
32	MF	(Singapore) Ong Yu En	11+6	0	3+2	0	0	0	22	0
51	MF	(Singapore) Taras Goh	0+1	0	0	0	0	0	1	0
54	MF	(Singapore) Jovan Ang	0	0	0+1	0	0	0	1	0
55	MF	(Singapore) Ethan Henry Pinto	0+2	0	0	0	0	0	2	0
56	FW	(Singapore) Ali Manaf	0+2	0	0	0	0	0	2	0
57	DF	(Singapore) Adam Reefdy	7+7	0	0	0	0+2	0	16	0
58	MF	(Singapore) Caelan Cheong Tze Jay	0+1	0	0	0	0	0	1	0
70	DF	(Singapore) Andrew Aw	4+12	0	1	0	1	0	18	0
77	MF	(Singapore) Amir Mirza	0+1	1	0	0	0	0	1	1
Players who have played this season and/or sign for the season but had left the club or on loan to other club
14	FW	(Singapore) Marc Ryan Tan	0+8	1	0	0	0	0	8	1

== Competitions ==
=== Overview ===
Competition	Record							
Competition	P	W	D	L	GF	GA	GD	Win %
Singapore Premier League	28	15	5	8	76	57	+19	53.57
Singapore Cup	6	4	0	2	18	7	+11	66.67
AFC Cup	2	0	0	2	2	5	−3	0.00
Total	36	19	5	12	96	69	+27	52.78

Results summary (SPL)

Overall								Home						Away					
Pld	W	D	L	GF	GA	GD	Pts	W	D	L	GF	GA	GD	W	D	L	GF	GA	GD
24	12	4	8	63	50	+13	40	7	2	2	31	22	+9	5	2	6	32	28	+4

=== Singapore Premier League ===
Win Draw Loss

26 February 2022 1	Balestier Khalsa (Singapore)	2–2	(Singapore) Tampines Rovers	Toa Payoh
	Shuhei Hoshino 46'; Ensar Brunčević 57'	Report	Boris Kopitović 37'; Taufik Suparno 45+1'; Shuya Yamashita (yellow card) 28'; Syed Firdaus Hassan (yellow card) 82'	Stadium: Toa Payoh Stadium; Referee: Muhammad Taqi

13 March 2022 2	Lion City Sailors (Singapore)	1–0	(Singapore) Tampines Rovers	Jalan Besar
	Kim Shin-wook 54' (pen.); Saifullah Akbar (yellow card) 30'; Diego Lopes (yellow card) 76'; Hami Syahin (yellow card) 80'	Report	Taufik Suparno (yellow card) 42'; Christopher van Huizen (yellow card) 53'; Adam Reefdy (yellow card) 77'; Firdaus Kasman (yellow card) 90+1'	Stadium: Jalan Besar Stadium; Referee: Jansen Foo

18 March 2022 3	Tampines Rovers (Singapore)	7–1	(Singapore) Hougang United	Tampines
	Boris Kopitović 11' 46' 87'; Taufik Suparno 22' 50'; Zehrudin Mehmedović 45'; Marc Ryan Tan 84'	Report	Shawal Anuar 52'; Farhan Zulkifli (yellow card) 40'	Stadium: Our Tampines Hub; Referee: Hilmi Fuad

2 April 2022 4	Geylang International (Singapore)	2–3	(Singapore) Tampines Rovers	Tampines
	Šime Žužul 9'; Khairul Hairie 30'; Ahmad Syahir (yellow card) 53' (yellow-red card) 55'; Vincent Bezecourt (yellow card) 83'	Report	Boris Kopitović 14' (pen.) 86' (yellow card) 87'; Christopher van Huizen 66'; Yasir Hanapi (yellow card) 39'; Firdaus Kasman (yellow card) 48'	Stadium: Our Tampines Hub; Attendance: 894; Referee: Andrea Verolino

6 April 2022 5	Tampines Rovers (Singapore)	3–3	(Singapore) Tanjong Pagar United	Tampines
	Faritz Abdul Hameed 12' (o.g.); Boris Kopitović 19'; Christopher van Huizen 64'; Kyoga Nakamura (yellow card) 72'; Ryaan Sanizal (yellow card) 79'; Irwan Shah (yellow card) 87'	Report	Reo Nishiguchi 68' (pen.) 75'; Mario Sugic 90+3' (yellow card) 90+3'; Raihan Rahman (yellow card) 59'; Faritz Hameed (yellow card) 70'; Rusyaidi Salime (yellow card) 84'	Stadium: Our Tampines Hub; Referee: Taufik Thana

9 April 2022 6	Tampines Rovers (Singapore)	3–3	(Japan) Albirex Niigata (S)	Tampines
	Boris Kopitović 31' (pen.) 35'; Firdaus Kasman 45'; Yasir Hanapi (yellow card) 89'	Report	Kodai Tanaka 8'; Jun Kobayashi 13'; Tadanari Lee 67'; Kan Kobayashi (yellow card) 81'	Stadium: Our Tampines Hub; Referee: Ahmad A'qashah

20 April 2022 7	Tampines Rovers (Singapore)	3–2	(Singapore) Young Lions FC	Tampines
	Boris Kopitović 56' 90+2'; Shuya Yamashita 82'; Zehrudin Mehmedović (yellow card) 24'; Taufik Suparno (yellow card) 48'; Irfan Najeeb (yellow card) 64'; Yasir Hanapi (yellow card) 90+3'	Report	Zikos Vasileios Chua 1'; Jordan Emaviwe 22'; Jared Gallagher (yellow card) 44'; Harith Kanadi (yellow card) 64'; Amir Syafiz (yellow card) 86'; Arshad Shamim (yellow card) 90+1'	Stadium: Our Tampines Hub; Referee: Hilmi Fuad

24 August 2022 8 (Rescheduled)	Young Lions FC (Singapore)	0–1	(Singapore) Tampines Rovers	Jalan Besar
	Syed Akmal (yellow card) 86'	Report	Taufik Suparno 13' (yellow card) 82'	Stadium: Jalan Besar Stadium; Referee: Ahmad A'qashah

8 May 2022 9	Tampines Rovers (Singapore)	2–1	(Singapore) Balestier Khalsa	Tampines
	Zehrudin Mehmedović 32' (yellow card) 90+5'; Boris Kopitović 59'; Amirul Hakia (yellow card) 61'	Report	Gareth Low 15' (yellow card) 48'; Delwinder Singh (yellow card) 90+5' (yellow-red card) 90+6'	Stadium: Our Tampines Hub; Referee: Clarence Leow Hong Wei

21 May 2022 10	Tampines Rovers (Singapore)	0–4	(Singapore) Lion City Sailors	Tampines
	Kyoga Nakamura (yellow card) 54'; Irwan Shah (yellow card) 56'; Yasir Hanapi (yellow card) 90'	Report	Ryaan Sanizal 39' (o.g.); Maxime Lestienne 55' (yellow card) 60'; Song Ui-young 67'; Haiqal Pashia 71'; Nur Adam Abdullah (yellow card) 52'	Stadium: Our Tampines Hub; Referee: Ahmad A'qashah

28 May 2022 11	Tanjong Pagar United (Singapore)	4–2	(Singapore) Tampines Rovers	Jurong East
	Reo Nishiguchi 5' 32'; Rusyaidi Salime 21'; Shodai Nishikawa 38'; Khairul Amri (yellow card) 60'; Fathullah Rahmat (yellow card) 90'	Report	Firdaus Kasman 22'; Zehrudin Mehmedović 36'; Marc Ryan Tan (yellow card) 79'	Stadium: Jurong East Stadium; Referee: Andrea Verolino

18 June 2022 12	Tampines Rovers (Singapore)	2–0	(Singapore) Geylang International	Tampines
	Yasir Hanapi 33' (yellow card) 79'; Boris Kopitović 84'; Zehrudin Mehmedović (yellow card) 23'; Firdaus Kasman (yellow card) 74'	Report	Huzaifah Aziz (yellow card) 58' (yellow-red card) 83'	Stadium: Our Tampines Hub; Referee: Jansen Foo

4 July 2022 13 (Rescheduled)	Albirex Niigata (S) (Japan)	3–2	(Singapore) Tampines Rovers	Jurong East
	Kodai Tanaka 14'; Ilhan Fandi 60'; Jun Kobayashi 68'	Report	Boris Kopitović 61' 85' (pen.)	Stadium: Jurong East Stadium; Referee: Muhammad Taqi

9 July 2022 14	Balestier Khalsa (Singapore)	2–2	(Singapore) Tampines Rovers	Toa Payoh
	Ignatius Ang 7'; Shuhei Hoshino 39'; Ho Wai Loon (yellow card) 24'; Ensar Bruncevic (yellow card) 86'; Delwinder Singh (yellow card) 90'; Ryoya Taniguchi (yellow card) 90+4'	Report	Boris Kopitović 52'; Taufik Suparno 63'; Shuya Yamashita (yellow card) 64'	Stadium: Toa Payoh Stadium; Referee: Hilmi Fuad

13 July 2022 15	Hougang United (Singapore)	4–2	(Singapore) Tampines Rovers	Hougang
	Pedro Bortoluzo 12' (pen.) 37' 67' (yellow card) 23'; Shawal Anuar 90'; Nazrul Nazari (yellow card) 31'; Jordan Vestering (yellow card) 56'	Report	Kyoga Nakamura 28'; Boris Kopitović 57'; Adam Reefdy (yellow card) 11'; Firdaus Kasman (yellow card) 14'; Amirul Haikal (yellow card) 18'; Irfan Najeeb (yellow card) 38'	Stadium: Hougang Stadium; Referee: Farhad Mohamed

17 July 2022 16	Tampines Rovers (Singapore)	5–2	(Singapore) Young Lions FC	Tampines
	Boris Kopitović 11' (yellow card) 85'; Taufik Suparno 15' 78' (yellow card) 51'; Zehrudin Mehmedović 44'; Yasir Hanapi 58'; Irfan Najeeb (yellow card) 8'; Ryaan Sanizal (yellow card) 79'; Ethan Henry Pinto (yellow card) 82'	Report	Rasaq Akeem 35'; Zikos Vasileios Chua 70' (yellow card) 87'; Elijah Lim Teck Yong (yellow card) 68'; Jordan Emaviwe (yellow card) 90'	Stadium: Our Tampines Hub; Referee: Abirami Naidu

24 July 2022 17	Lion City Sailors (Singapore)	2–1	(Singapore) Tampines Rovers	Jalan Besar
	Song Ui-young 30' (yellow card) 90'; Pedro Henrique 90+4'; Hariss Harun (yellow card) 76'; Kim Do-hoon (yellow card) 89'; Nur Adam Abdullah (yellow card) 89'	Report	Taufik Suparno 77'; Yasir Hanapi (yellow card) 36'; Christopher van Huizen (yellow card) 39'; Boris Kopitović (yellow card) 89'; Syazwan Buhari (yellow card) 90+5'	Stadium: Jalan Besar Stadium; Referee: Ahmad A'qashah

30 July 2022 18	Tampines Rovers (Singapore)	2–4	(Singapore) Hougang United	Tampines
	Boris Kopitović 39' 55'; Kyoga Nakamura (yellow card) 12'; Taufik Suparno (yellow card) 59'; Yasir Hanapi (yellow card) 60'	Report	Kristijan Krajcek 29' 87' (yellow card) 90+4'; Kaishu Yamazaki 57'; Shawal Anuar 79'	Stadium: Our Tampines Hub; Referee: Hilmi Faud

3 August 2022 19	Geylang International (Singapore)	1–4	(Singapore) Tampines Rovers	Tampines
	Šime Žužul 85'; Rio Sakuma (yellow card) 19'; Ahmad Syahir (yellow card) 79'	Report	Boris Kopitović 39' 90+1'; Zehrudin Mehmedović 70'; Kyoga Nakamura 87'; Firdaus Kasman (yellow card) 18'; Christopher van Huizen (yellow card) 51'; Yasir Hanapi (yellow card) 65'	Stadium: Our Tampines Hub; Referee: Taufik Thana

13 August 2022 20	Tanjong Pagar United (Singapore)	3–4	(Singapore) Tampines Rovers	Jurong East
	Shodai Nishikawa 2'; Reo Nishiguchi 36' (pen.) 67' (pen.); Faizal Raffi 86'; Blake Ricciuto 90'	Report	Boris Kopitović 40'; Christopher van Huizen 42'; Yasir Hanapi 52'; Shuya Yamashita 78'; Irwan Shah (yellow card) 65'	Stadium: Jurong East Stadium; Referee: Hilmi Fuad

19 August 2022 21	Albirex Niigata (S) (Japan)	4–2	(Singapore) Tampines Rovers	Jurong East
	Kodai Tanaka 4' 29'; Ilhan Fandi 45+2' 55'; Daichi Omori (yellow card) 76'	Report	Boris Kopitović 11'; Kyoga Nakamura 22'; Ryaan Sanizal (yellow card) 71'; Christopher van Huizen (yellow card) 44'; Taufik Suparno (yellow card) 82'	Stadium: Jurong East Stadium; Referee: Andrea Verolino

28 August 2022 22	Tampines Rovers (Singapore)	2–1	(Singapore) Balestier Khalsa	Tampines
	Boris Kopitović 37' 90' (pen.); Syed Firdaus (yellow card) 41'; Irwan Shah (yellow card) 84'	Report	Shuhei Hoshino 48'; Madhu Mohana (yellow card) 21'; Ensar Brunčević (yellow card) 26'; Akmal bin Azman (yellow card) 49'	Stadium: Our Tampines Hub; Referee: Farhad Mohamed

3 September 2022 23	Young Lions FC (Singapore)	0–7	(Singapore) Tampines Rovers	Jalan Besar
	Syed Akmal (yellow card) 87'	Report	Kyoga Nakamura 24'; Yasir Hanapi 48'; Zehrudin Mehmedović 55'; Boris Kopitović 63' 67'; Taufik Suparno 65'; Amir Mirza 82'	Stadium: Jalan Besar Stadium; Referee: Taufik Thana

10 September 2022 24	Tampines Rovers (Singapore)	2–1	(Singapore) Lion City Sailors	Tampines
	Boris Kopitović 54'; Zehrudin Mehmedović 58'; Amirul Hakia (yellow card) 39'; Yasir Hanapi (yellow card) 79'	Report	Maxime Lestienne 55'; Amirul Adli (yellow card) 72'	Stadium: Our Tampines Hub; Referee: Muhammad Taqi

20 October 2022 25 (Rescheduled)	Tampines Rovers (Singapore)	4–3	(Singapore) Tanjong Pagar United	Tampines
	Yasir Hanapi 19'; Joel Chew 90+2'; Boris Kopitović 61' (pen.) 73' (pen.); Irwan Shah (yellow card) 37'	Report	Blake Ricciuto 14'; Mirko Šugić 27'; Khairul Nizam 75'; Shahrin Saberin (yellow card) 88'	Stadium: Our Tampines Hub; Referee: Muhammad Taqi

1 October 2022 26	Tampines Rovers (Singapore)	0–0	(Singapore) Geylang International	Tampines
		Report		Stadium: Our Tampines Hub; Referee: Ahmad A'qashah

8 October 2022 27	Hougang United (Singapore)	1–4	(Singapore) Tampines Rovers	Hougang
	André Moritz 40' (yellow card) 52'; Nazhiim Harman (red card) 16'; Shawal Anuar (yellow card) 54'; Zulfahmi Arifin (yellow card) 77'	Report	Taufik Suparno 15' 17'; Boris Kopitović 41' 78' (pen.) (penalty missed) 17; Firdaus Kasman (yellow card) 36'; Irfan Najeeb (yellow card) 45'	Stadium: Hougang Stadium; Referee: Farhad Mohamed

15 October 2022 28	Tampines Rovers (Singapore)	5–3	(Japan) Albirex Niigata (S)	Tampines
	Boris Kopitović 10' 68'; Taufik Suparno 45+1'; Yasir Hanapi 67'; Kyoga Nakamura 89'	Report	Ilhan Fandi 1'; Kodai Tanaka 53'; Ryaan Sanizal 85' (o.g.)	Stadium: Our Tampines Hub; Referee: Ahmad A'qashah

Pos	Team	Pld	W	D	L	GF	GA	GD	Pts	Qualification or relegation
1	Albirex Niigata (S) (Note: The foreign club – Albirex Niigata (S) – as well as the Football Association of Singapore (FAS) under-21 team, Young Lions, are ineligible for any AFC competition spots.) (C)	28	17	8	3	88	43	+45	59	
2	Lion City Sailors (Q)	28	18	3	7	91	39	+52	57	Qualification for AFC Champions League Group stage
3	Tampines Rovers (Q)	28	15	5	8	76	57	+19	50	Standby team for AFC Cup group stage
4	Geylang International	28	10	9	9	48	46	+2	39	
5	Hougang United	28	10	9	9	65	71	−6	39	Qualification for AFC Cup group stage (Cup Winner)
6	Tanjong Pagar United	28	10	7	11	59	69	−10	37	
7	Balestier Khalsa	28	7	3	18	45	78	−33	24	
8	Young Lions	28	2	2	24	34	103	−69	8	

Source: Singapore Premier League
Rules for classification: 1) points; 2) goal difference; 3) number of goals scored; 4) number of wins
(C) Champions; (Q) Qualified for the phase indicated

=== AFC Cup ===
Win Draw Loss

==== Group stage ====
Pos	Team	Pld	W	D	L	GF	GA	GD	Pts	Qualification	PSM	KLC	TAM
1	(Indonesia) PSM Makassar	2	1	1	0	3	1	+2	4 (Note: Tied on head-to-head results. Overall goal difference used as tiebreaker.)	Zonal semi-finals	—	0–0	—
2	(Malaysia) Kuala Lumpur City (H)	2	1	1	0	2	1	+1	4	Zonal semi-finals	—	—	2–1
3	(Singapore) Tampines Rovers	2	0	0	2	2	5	−3	0		1–3	—	—

Source: AFC
Rules for classification: Tiebreakers
(H) Hosts
Notes:

27 June 2022 1	Tampines Rovers (Singapore)	1–3	(Indonesia) PSM Makassar	Kuala Lumpur
	Zehrudin Mehmedović 29'; Christopher van Huizen (yellow card) 25' (yellow-red card) 30'; Irfan Najeeb (yellow card) 70'; Adam Reefdy (yellow card) 83'; Irwan Shah (yellow card) 89'	Report	Rizky Eka Pratama 48'; Everton 79' 90+4' (pen.) (yellow card) 80'; Ricky Pratama (yellow card) 20'; Akbar Tanjung (yellow card) 58'	Stadium: Kuala Lumpur Stadium; Attendance: 302; Referee: Vahid Kazemi (Iran)

30 June 2022 2	Tampines Rovers (Singapore)	1–2	(Malaysia) Kuala Lumpur City	Kuala Lumpur
	Paulo Josué 16' 21'; Giancarlo Gallifuoco (yellow card) 29'	Report	Boris Kopitović 37'; Irfan Najeeb (yellow card) 43'; Irwan Shah (yellow card) 45+2'; Yasir Hanapi (yellow card) 58'	Stadium: Kuala Lumpur Stadium; Referee: Masoud Tufaylieh (Syria)

=== Singapore Cup ===
Win Draw Loss

Pos	Team	Pld	W	D	L	GF	GA	GD	Pts	Qualification
1	Tampines Rovers (Q)	3	2	0	1	7	4	+3	6	Semi-finals
2	Hougang United (Q)	3	2	0	1	6	4	+2	6	Semi-finals
3	Tanjong Pagar United	3	2	0	1	6	6	0	6	
4	Geylang International	3	0	0	3	4	9	−5	0	

Updated to match(es) played on 25 September 2022. Source: FAS
(Q) Qualified for the phase indicated

==== Group ====
28 October 2022 Match 1	Geylang International (Singapore)	2–3	(Singapore) Tampines Rovers	Tampines
	Šime Žužul 67'; Khairul Hairie 88'; Joshua Pereira (yellow card) 32'; Ahmad Syahir (yellow card) 55'; Huzaifah Aziz (yellow card) 69'	Report	Faizal Roslan 3' (o.g.); Boris Kopitović 44' (pen.); Kyoga Nakamura 90+1'	Stadium: Our Tampines Hub; Referee: Shadiq Al-Hussain

1 November 2022 Match 2	Tampines Rovers (Singapore)	4–1	(Singapore) Tanjong Pagar United	Tampines
	Yasir Hanapi 15'; Boris Kopitović 26'; Kyoga Nakamura 60'; Taufik Suparno 72'; Zehrudin Mehmedović (yellow card) 22'; Ryaan Sanizal (yellow card) 88'	Report	Reo Nishiguchi 23' (penalty missed) 88; Shahrin Saberin (yellow card) 58'; Raihan Rahman (yellow card) 71'; Rusyaidi Salime (yellow card) 84'; Shakir Hamzah (yellow card) 85'	Stadium: Our Tampines Hub; Referee: Ahmad A'qashah

6 November 2022 Match 3	Hougang United (Singapore)	1–0	(Singapore) Tampines Rovers	Hougang
	Sahil Suhaimi 53'; Shawal Anuar (yellow card) 37'; Kristijan Krajcek (yellow card) 68'	Report	Ryaan Sanizal (yellow card) 35'; Taufik Suparno (yellow card) 39'; Amirul Haikal (yellow card) 49'; Yasir Hanapi (yellow card) 69'	Stadium: Hougang Stadium; Referee: Taufik Thana

==== Semi-final ====
11 November 2022	Tampines Rovers (Singapore)	8–1	(Singapore) Balestier Khalsa	Tampines
	Taufik Suparno 26'; Yasir Hanapi 27'; Boris Kopitović 31' 71' 73' (yellow card) 72'; Joel Chew 52'; Zehrudin Mehmedović 78' 90+1'; Irwan Shah (yellow card) 80'	Report	Daniel Goh 81'; Hairul Syirhan (yellow card) 37'; Ensar Brunčević (yellow card) 85'	Stadium: Our Tampines Hub; Referee: Shadiq Al-Hussain

15 November 2022	Balestier Khalsa (Singapore)	0–1	(Singapore) Tampines Rovers	Toa Payoh
	Ryoya Taniguchi (penalty missed) 61; Ho Wai Loon (yellow card) 50'; Kuraba Kondo (yellow card) 57'; Madhu Mohana (yellow card) 90'	Report	Hairul Syirhan 12' (o.g.); Syed Firdaus (yellow card) 30'; Taufik Suparno (yellow card) 42'; Christopher van Huizen (yellow card) 73'; Shameer Aziq (yellow card) 90+3'	Stadium: Toa Payoh Stadium; Referee: Hilmi Fuad

Tampines Rovers won 9–1 on aggregate.

==== Final ====
19 November 2022	Hougang United (Singapore)	3–2	(Singapore) Tampines Rovers	Jalan Besar
	Kristijan Krajcek 17' 57' 79' (yellow card) 58'; Pedro Bortoluzo (yellow card) 45+2'; Zulfahmi Arifin (yellow card) 45+2'; Zainol Gulam (yellow card) 87'; Nazrul Nazari (yellow card) 90+3'	Report	Taufik Suparno 39'; Irfan Najeeb 48'; Taufik Suparno (yellow card) 83'	Stadium: Jalan Besar Stadium; Referee: Ahmad A'qashah

== Competition (Women) ==
Women's National League

=== Group ===
(Played under name of JSSL FC)

Win Draw Loss

8 October 2022 Group 1	JSSL FC (Singapore)	1–0	(Singapore) Ayer Rajah Gryphons FC	Yishun
				Stadium: Yishun Stadium

16 October 2022 Group 2	JSSL FC (Singapore)	1–2	(Singapore) Royal Arion WFC	Yishun
				Stadium: Yishun Stadium

30 October 2022 Group 3	JSSL FC (Singapore)	5–0	(Singapore) Winchester Isla FC	Yishun
				Stadium: Yishun Stadium

League table

Pos	Team	Pld	W	D	L	GF	GA	GD	Pts	Qualification or relegation
1	Royal Arion WFC (Q)	3	2	1	0	4	1	+3	7	Qualified for Semi Final
2	JSSL FC (Q)	3	2	0	1	7	2	+5	6	Qualified for Semi Final
3	Winchester Isla FC	3	1	0	2	3	7	−4	3	
4	Ayer Rajah Gryphons FC	3	0	1	2	0	4	−4	1	

Updated to match(es) played on 1 October 2022. Source: FAS
(Q) Qualified for the phase indicated

=== Semi-final ===
5 November 2022 Semi Final	JSSL FC (Singapore)	2–0	(Singapore) Royal Arion WFC	Yishun
				Stadium: Yishun Stadium

=== Final ===
12 November 2022 Final	JSSL FC (Singapore)	0–4	(Singapore) Police SA	Yishun
				Stadium: Yishun Stadium
