= 2021 Tampines Rovers FC season =

Tampines Rovers FC
2021 season
- Chairman: Desmond Ong
- Coach: Gavin Lee
- Ground: Our Tampines Hub
Home colours	Away colours

The 2021 season was Tampines Rovers's 26th season at the top level of Singapore football and 76th year in existence as a football club. The club will also compete in the Singapore League Cup, the Singapore Cup, and the AFC Champions League. The season covers from 13 March 2021 to 11 September 2021.

== Squad ==
=== Singapore Premier League ===
As of February 18, 2020

No.	Name	Nationality	Date of Birth (Age)	Last club	Contract Since	Contract End
Goalkeepers
19	Zulfairuuz Rudy	(Singapore)	22 May 1994 (age 32)	(Singapore) Hougang United	2019	2021
24	Syazwan Buhari	(Singapore)	22 September 1992 (age 34)	(Singapore) Geylang International	2018	2021
Defenders
3	Ryaan Sanizal ^{U23}	(Singapore)	31 May 2002 (age 24)	(Singapore) FFA U16	2019	2021
5	Baihakki Khaizan ^{>30}	(Singapore)	31 January 1984 (age 42)	(Thailand) PT Prachuap F.C.	2020	2021
6	Madhu Mohana	(Singapore)	6 March 1991 (age 35)	(Malaysia) Negeri Sembilan FA	2018	2021
16	Daniel Bennett ^{>30}	(Singapore) (England)	7 January 1978 (age 48)	(Singapore) Geylang International	2017	2021
17	Irwan Shah ^{>30}	(Singapore)	2 November 1988 (age 38)	(Singapore) Warriors FC	2016	2021
21	Hamizan Hisham ^{U23}	(Singapore)	10 November 2001 (age 25)	(Singapore) FFA U18	2019	2021
23	Irfan Najeeb ^{U23}	(Singapore)	31 July 1999 (age 27)	(Singapore) Young Lions FC	2021	2021
	Akmal Azman ^{U23}	(Singapore)	21 November 2000 (age 25)	(Singapore) Young Lions FC	2021	2021
Midfielders
4	Huzaifah Aziz	(Singapore)	27 June 1994 (age 32)	(Singapore) Balestier Khalsa	2020	2021
7	Yasir Hanapi (Captain) ^{>30}	(Singapore)	21 June 1989 (age 37)	(Malaysia) PDRM FA	2018	2021
8	Kyoga Nakamura	(Japan)	25 April 1996 (age 30)	(Singapore) Albirex Niigata (S)	2020	2021
10	Zehrudin Mehmedović	(Serbia)	15 March 1998 (age 28)	(Serbia) FK Mladost Lučani	2019	2021
12	Amirul Haikal ^{U23}	(Singapore)	11 October 1999 (age 27)	(Singapore) Young Lions FC	2021	2021
14	Marc Ryan Tan ^{U23}	(Singapore)	8 January 2002 (age 24)	(Singapore) Young Lions FC	2021	2021
18	Iman Hakim ^{U23}	(Singapore)	9 March 2002 (age 24)	(Singapore) Albirex Niigata (S)	2021	2021
Forwards
9	Boris Kopitović	(Montenegro)	27 April 1995 (age 31)	(Montenegro) OFK Petrovac	2020	2021
11	Armin Bosnjak	(Montenegro)	20 April 1994 (age 32)	(Kosovo) FC Ballkani	2021	2021
13	Taufik Suparno	(Singapore) (Indonesia)	31 October 1995 (age 31)	(Singapore) SAFSA	2018	2021
28	Fazrul Nawaz ^{>30}	(Singapore)	17 April 1985 (age 41)	(Singapore) Hougang United	2020	2021
Players loaned out / left during season
15	Shah Shahiran ^{U23}	(Singapore)	14 November 1999 (age 27)	(Singapore) FFA U18	2018	2021

== Coaching staff ==
Position	Name	Ref.
Chairman	(Singapore) Desmond Ong	
General Manager	(Singapore) William Phang	
Head Coach	(Singapore) Kadir Yahaya	
First Team Coach	(Singapore) Gavin Lee	Sign extension till 2024
Assistant Coach	(Singapore) Fahrudin Mustafić	
Goalkeeping Coach	(Singapore) William Phang	
COE U21 Coach	(Singapore) Afiq Yahya	
COE U17 Coach	(Singapore) Sofiyan Abdul Hamid	
COE U15 Coach	(Singapore) Joseph Ng	
COE Goalkeeping Coach	(Singapore) Rezal Hassan	
Physiotherapist	(Singapore) Premjit Singh	
Kitman	(Singapore) Goh Koon Hiang	

== Transfers ==
=== In ===
Preseason

Position	Player	Transferred From	Ref
GK	(Singapore) Dylan Christopher Goh	(Singapore) Geylang International U19	
MF	(Singapore) Iman Hakim	(Singapore) Albirex Niigata (S)	Free
MF	(Singapore) Amirul Haikal	(Singapore) Young Lions FC	Free
FW	(Singapore) Marc Ryan Tan	(Singapore) Young Lions FC	Free
FW	(Montenegro) Armin Bosnjak	(Kosovo) FC Ballkani	Free

Mid-season

Position	Player	Transferred From	Ref
MF	(Singapore) Huzaifah Aziz	Free Agent	

=== Loan Return ===
Preseason

Position	Player	Transferred From	Ref
GK	(Singapore) Haikal Hasnol		Loan Return
GK	(Singapore) Nurshafiq Zaini	(Singapore) Young Lions FC	Loan Return
DF	(Singapore) Irfan Najeeb	(Singapore) Young Lions FC	Loan Return
DF	(Singapore) Akmal Azman	(Singapore) Young Lions FC	Loan Return

Note 1: Nurshafiq Zaini returned to Young Lions on loan for another season.

Note 2: Haikal Hasnol returned to the club after NS before being released.

Mid-season

Position	Player	Transferred From	Ref
GK	(Singapore) Nurshafiq Zaini	(Singapore) Young Lions FC	Loan return

Nurshafiq Zaini returned and retired with immediate effect.

=== Out ===
Preseason

Position	Player	Transferred To	Ref
GK	(Singapore) Haikal Hasnol		Free
DF	(Singapore) Syahrul Sazali	(Singapore) SAFSA	NS till 2022
MF	(Singapore) Joel Chew Joon Herng	(Singapore) SAFSA	NS till 2022
DF	(Singapore) Shannon Stephen	(Singapore)	Free
DF	(Singapore) Fathullah Rahmat	(Singapore) Tanjong Pagar United U21	Free
DF	(Singapore) Amirul Adli	(Singapore) Lion City Sailors	Free
MF	(Singapore) Huzaifah Aziz	(Singapore)	Free
MF	(Singapore) Haziq Mikhail	(Singapore) Lion City Sailors U21	
FW	(Canada) (Jamaica) (Singapore) Jordan Webb	(Canada) Atlético Ottawa	Free

Note 1: Syahrul Sazali & Joel Chew subsequently moved to Young Lions for the 2021 season on loan.

=== Loan Out ===
Position	Player	Transferred To	Ref
GK	(Singapore) Nurshafiq Zaini	(Singapore) Young Lions FC	Season loan
MF	(Singapore) Nicky Melvin Singh	(Singapore) Albirex Niigata (S)	Season loan

=== Extension and retained ===
Position	Player	Ref
Coach	(Singapore) Gavin Lee	2 years extension starting 2020
GK	(Singapore) Syazwan Buhari	
GK	(Singapore) Zulfairuuz Rudy	
DF	(Singapore) Ryaan Sanizal	
DF	(Singapore) Hamizan Hisham	
DF	(Singapore) Irwan Shah	
DF	(Singapore) Madhu Mohana	
DF	(Singapore) Baihakki Khaizan	2 years contract signed in 2020
DF	(Singapore) (England) Daniel Bennett	
DF	(Singapore) Andrew Aw	
MF	(Singapore) Yasir Hanapi	
MF	(Japan) Kyoga Nakamura	
MF	(Serbia) Zehrudin Mehmedovic	
MF	(Singapore) Shah Shahiran	
FW	(Singapore) Danish Siregar	
FW	(Singapore) Taufik Suparno	
FW	(Montenegro) Boris Kopitovic	
FW	(Singapore) Fazrul Nawaz	

Mid-Season

Position	Player	Transferred To	Ref
MF	(Singapore) Shah Shahiran	(Singapore) SAFSA	NS till 2023

== Friendlies ==
=== Pre-season ===
Win Draw Loss

5 March 2021	Tampines Rovers (Singapore)	6–1	(Singapore) Hougang United	Singapore
	Yasir Hanapi; Armin Bosnjak; Taufik Suparno; Kyoga Nakamura			Stadium: Our Tampines Hub; Attendance: 0 (Note: Due to the COVID-19 pandemic, this match was played behind closed doors.)

=== In-season ===
Win Draw Loss

5 June 2021 1	Singapore U-22	1–0	(Singapore) Tampines Rovers	Jurong East Stadium
			Jacob Mahler	Attendance: 0

12 June 2021 2	Albirex Niigata (S) (Singapore)	v	(Singapore) Tampines Rovers	Geylang Field
				Attendance: 0

== Team statistics ==
=== Appearances and goals ===
21 September 2021

No.	Pos.	Player	Sleague		ACL / AFC Cup		Total	
No.	Pos.	Player	Apps.	Goals	Apps.	Goals	Apps.	Goals
3	DF	(Singapore) Ryaan Sanizal	9+2	1	5	0	16	1
4	MF	(Singapore) Huzaifah Aziz	0+1	0	0+4	0	5	0
5	DF	(Singapore) Baihakki Khaizan	12+2	0	4+2	0	20	0
6	DF	(Singapore) Madhu Mohana	14+3	2	5	0	22	2
7	MF	(Singapore) Yasir Hanapi	17+3	6	5	0	25	6
8	MF	(Japan) Kyoga Nakamura	21	3	6	0	27	3
9	FW	(Montenegro) Boris Kopitović	19+2	16	5+1	0	27	16
10	MF	(Serbia) Zehrudin Mehmedović	17+2	5	6	0	25	5
11	FW	(Montenegro) Armin Bosnjak	16+4	1	6	0	26	1
12	MF	(Singapore) Amirul Haikal	14+1	0	1+3	0	19	0
13	FW	(Singapore) Taufik Suparno	3+17	6	0	0	20	6
14	FW	(Singapore) Marc Ryan Tan	10+4	3	5	0	19	3
16	DF	(Singapore) Daniel Bennett	12+3	1	3+2	1	20	2
17	DF	(Singapore) Irwan Shah	14+6	1	5	0	25	1
18	MF	(Singapore) Iman Hakim	12	0	2+1	0	15	0
19	GK	(Singapore) Zulfairuuz Rudy	3+1	0	1	0	5	0
21	DF	(Singapore) Hamizan Hisham	0	0	0	0	0	0
23	DF	(Singapore) Irfan Najeeb	10+1	1	2+2	0	15	1
24	GK	(Singapore) Syazwan Buhari	17	0	5	0	22	0
28	FW	(Singapore) Fazrul Nawaz	0+3	0	0+6	0	9	0
43	MF	(Singapore) Amir Mirza	0+2	0	0	0	2	0
44	GK	(Singapore) Danial Iliya	0+1	0	0	0	1	0
45	DF	(Singapore) Andrew Aw	4+2	0	0+1	0	7	0
57	MF	(Singapore) Adam Reefdy	0+1	0	0+1	0	2	0
Players who have played this season and/or sign for the season but had left the club or on loan to other club
15	MF	(Singapore) Shah Shahiran	6	0	0	0	6	0

== Competitions ==
=== Overview ===
Competition	Record							
Competition	P	W	D	L	GF	GA	GD	Win %
SPL	19	7	4	8	47	50	−3	36.84
AFC Champions League	6	0	0	6	1	27	−26	0.00
Total	25	7	4	14	48	77	−29	28.00

=== Charity Shield ===
19 June 2021 Charity Shield	Albirex Niigata (S) (Japan)	Cancelled	(Singapore) Tampines Rovers	Jalan Besar Stadium

=== Singapore Premier League ===
Win Draw Loss

13 March 2021 1	Lion City Sailors (Singapore)	3–3	(Singapore) Tampines Rovers	Jalan Besar Stadium
	Song Ui-young 4'; Gabriel Quak 5' 58' (yellow card) 40'; Saifullah Akbar (yellow card) 77'; Stipe Plazibat (yellow card) 86'	Report	Madhu Mohana 19'; Yasir Hanapi 63' 67'; Shah Shahiran (yellow card) 42'; Taufik Suparno (yellow card) 75'	Attendance: 0 Referee: Jansen Foo

17 March 2021 2	Balestier Khalsa (Singapore)	1–2	(Singapore) Tampines Rovers	Toa Payoh Stadium
	Amer Hakeem 67' (yellow card) 31'; Kristijan Krajcek (yellow card) 38'; Hazzuwan Halim (yellow card) 68'; Faizal Raffi (yellow card) 73'; Ensar Brunčević (yellow card) 82'	Report	Taufik Suparno 55'; Boris Kopitović 70'; Madhu Mohana (yellow card) 45+2'	Attendance: 0 Referee: Abirami Naidu

21 March 2021 3	Tampines Rovers (Singapore)	3–1	(Singapore) Tanjong Pagar United	Our Tampines Hub
	Madhu Mohana 5'; Yasir Hanapi 61'; Taufik Suparno 85'; Irwan Shah (yellow card) 69'; Irfan Najeeb (yellow card) 71'		Luiz Júnior 80' (pen.); Fashah Iskandar (yellow card) 33'; Rusyaidi Salime (yellow card) 59'	Attendance: 0 Referee: Ahmad A'qashah

3 April 2021 4	Hougang United (Singapore)	5–1	(Singapore) Tampines Rovers	Hougang Stadium
	Tomoyuki Doi 19' 22' 90'; Maksat Dzhakybaliev 68' (yellow card) 54'; Shahfiq Ghani 71'; Lionel Tan (yellow card) 8'	Report	Boris Kopitović 23'; Baihakki Khaizan (yellow card) 36' (yellow-red card) 70'; Shah Shahiran (yellow card) 83'	Attendance: 0 Referee: Lim Liang Yi

7 April 2021 5	Tampines Rovers (Singapore)	7–0	(Singapore) Young Lions FC	Our Tampines Hub
	Kyoga Nakamura 13' 69'; Boris Kopitović 21' 80' (pen.) 87'; Yasir Hanapi 45' 67'; Zehrudin Mehmedovic (yellow card) 81'	Report		Attendance: 0 Referee: Nathan Chan

11 April 2021 6	Albirex Niigata (S) (Japan)	2–1	(Singapore) Tampines Rovers	Jurong East Stadium
	Ryoya Tanigushi 21'; Kuraba Kondo 63'; Fairoz Hasan (yellow card) 18'; Kiyoshiro Tsuboi (yellow card) 18'; Yu Tokiwa (yellow card) 74'	Report	Boris Kopitović 9'; Yasir Hanapi (yellow card) 73'; Shah Shahiran (yellow card) 85'	Attendance: 0 Referee: Juherman Zaiton

16 April 2021 7	Tampines Rovers (Singapore)	3–2	(Singapore) Geylang International	Our Tampines Hub
	Zehrudin Mehmedović 32' (pen.); Boris Kopitović 51'; Taufik Suparno 79'	Report	Matheus Moresche 50' 62'; Firdaus Kasman (yellow card) 34'; Harith Kanadi (yellow card) 89'	Attendance: 0 Referee: Ahmad A'qashah

24 April 2021 8 (Rescheduled)	Tanjong Pagar United (Singapore)	2–2	(Singapore) Tampines Rovers	Jurong East Stadium
	Reo Nishiguchi 21' (yellow card) 86'; Luiz Júnior 60' (pen.); Anaqi Ismit (yellow card) 37'; Suhairi Sabri (yellow card) 78'; Rusyaidi Salime (yellow card) 78'; Fashah Iskandar (yellow card) 88'	Report	Armin Bosnjak 38'; Daniel Bennett 45+4'; Madhu Mohana (yellow card) 52'; Taufik Suparno (yellow card) 89'	Referee: Juherman Zaiton

22 May 2021 9	Tampines Rovers (Singapore)	2–3	(Singapore) Hougang United	Our Tampines Hub
	Yasir Hanapi 12'; Boris Kopitović 62'	Report	Nazrul Nazari 45+1' (yellow card) 39'; Tomoyuki Doi 50'; Idraki Adnan 55'; Shafiq Ghani (yellow card) 88'; Muhaimin Suhaimi (yellow card) 90+4'	Attendance: 0 Referee: Taufik Thana

15 May 2021 10 (Rescheduled)	Tampines Rovers (Singapore)	5–1	(Singapore) Balestier Khalsa	Our Tampines Hub
	Boris Kopitović 9' 24' (pen.); Marc Ryan Tan 13' 35'; Ryaan Sanizal 88'	Report	Šime Žužul 20' (pen.); Aqil Yazid (yellow card) 9'; Gautam Selvamany (yellow card) 52'	Attendance: 0 Referee: Jansen Foo

8 May 2021 11 (Rescheduled)	Tampines Rovers (Singapore)	2–2	(Japan) Albirex Niigata (S)	Our Tampines Hub
	Boris Kopitović 53' 90+6' (pen.); Zehrudin Mehmedović (yellow card) 74'; Baihakki Khaizan (yellow card) 79'; Daniel Bennett (yellow card) 90+6' (yellow-red card) 90+7'	Report	Kiyoshiro Tsuboi 35' 49'; Ryoya Tanigushi (yellow card) 31'; Yu Tokiwa (yellow card) 56'	Attendance: 0 Referee: Farhad Mohamed

2 May 2021 12 (Rescheduled)	Young Lions FC (Singapore)	0–4	(Singapore) Tampines Rovers	Jalan Besar Stadium
	Harhys Stewart (yellow card) 35'; Hami Syahin (yellow card) 68'; Jacob Mahler (yellow card) 78'; Zulqarnaen Suzliman (yellow card) 85'	Report	Zehrudin Mehmedović 3'; Irwan Shah 19'; Kyoga Nakamura 43'; Taufik Suparno 80'; Ryaan Sanizal (yellow card) 60'	Referee: Ahmad A'qashah

21 September 2021 13 (Rescheduled)	Tampines Rovers (Singapore)	1–6	(Singapore) Lion City Sailors	Our Tampines Hub
	Hariss Harun 51' (o.g.); Iman Hakim (yellow card) 27'; Andrew Aw (yellow card) 75'	Report	Haiqal Pashia 37'; Gabriel Quak 56'; Song Ui-young 67' 79'; Faris Ramli 74'; Daniel Bennett 76' (o.g.); Tajeli Salamat (yellow card) 61'	Attendance: 1000; Referee: Farhad Mohamed

25 August 2021 14 (Rescheduled)	Geylang International (Singapore)	3–1	(Singapore) Tampines Rovers	Our Tampines Hub
	Danny Kim 59'; Amy Recha 65'; Christopher van Huizen 77'; Afiq Yunos (yellow card) 53'; Barry Maguire (yellow card) 88'	Report	Boris Kopitović 45'	Referee: Juherman Zaiton

15 August 2021 15 (Rescheduled)	Lion City Sailors (Singapore)	4–1	(Singapore) Tampines Rovers	Jalan Besar Stadium
	Gabriel Quak 34'; Stipe Plazibat 36' 48'; Saifullah Akbar 46'; Song Ui-young (yellow card) 85'	Report	Boris Kopitović 59'; Baihakki Khaizan (yellow card) 40'; Yasir Hanapi (yellow card) 70'; Zehrudin Mehmedović (yellow card) 82'	Attendance: 500; Referee: Farhad Mohamed

19 August 2021 16 (Rescheduled)	Balestier Khalsa (Singapore)	5–2	(Singapore) Tampines Rovers	Toa Payoh Stadium
	Kristijan Krajcek 9'; Šime Žužul 13' 61' 89'; Shuhei Hoshino 65'; Gareth Low (yellow card) 35'; Aidil Johari (yellow card) 35'	Report	Zehrudin Mehmedović 17' 40' (yellow card) 35'; Irwan Shah (yellow card) 25'; Armin Bosnjak (yellow card) 35'; Baihakki Khaizan (yellow card) 90'	Referee: Nathan Chan

29 August 2021 17 (Rescheduled)	Tampines Rovers (Singapore)	2–2	(Singapore) Tanjong Pagar United	Our Tampines Hub
	Irfan Najeeb 17'; Marc Ryan Tan 35'; Irwan Shah (yellow card) 73' (yellow-red card) 90+3'	Report	Shakir Hamzah 29'; Anaqi Ismit 45'; Khairul Amri (yellow card) 70'; Rusyaidi Salime (yellow card) 89'; Shahrin Saberin (yellow card) 90+4'	Referee: Jansen Foo

11 September 2021 18 (Rescheduled)	Hougang United (Singapore)	7–3	(Singapore) Tampines Rovers	Hougang Stadium
	Fabian Kwok 3'; Tomoyuki Doi 18' 23' 33'; Lionel Tan 65'; Gilberto Fortunato 73'; Hafiz Sujad 80'; Farhan Zulkifli (yellow card) 55'	Report	Zehrudin Mehmedović 12' (yellow card) 30'; Boris Kopitović 42' 59'; Taufik Suparno (yellow card) 65'	Referee: Juherman Zaiton

18 September 2021 19 (Rescheduled)	Tampines Rovers (Singapore)	2–1	(Singapore) Young Lions FC	Our Tampines Hub
	Daniel Goh 34' (o.g.); Taufik Suparno 71'; Baihakki Khaizan (yellow card) 15'; Amirul Haikal (yellow card) 29'; Madhu Mohana (yellow card) 69'; Yasir Hanapi (yellow card) 90'	Report	Jacob Mahler 70' (pen.); Shah Shahiran (yellow card) 82'	Referee: Abirami Naidu

24 September 2021 20 (Rescheduled)	Albirex Niigata (S) (Japan)	0–0	(Singapore) Tampines Rovers	Jurong East Stadium
		Report	Zehrudin Mehmedovic (yellow card) 44'	Referee: Juherman Zaiton

10 October 2021 21 (Rescheduled)	Tampines Rovers (Singapore)	1–1	(Singapore) Geylang International	Our Tampines Hub
	Taufik Suparno 73'; Iman Hakim (yellow card) 90'	Report	Amy Recha 90' (pen.); Abdil Qaiyyim Mutalib (yellow card) 62' (yellow-red card) 90'	Referee: Farhad Mohamed

Pos	Team	Pld	W	D	L	GF	GA	GD	Pts	Qualification or relegation
1	Lion City Sailors	21	14	6	1	59	21	+38	48	Qualification for AFC Champions League group stage
2	Albirex Niigata (S) (Note: The foreign club – Albirex Niigata (S) – as well as the Football Association of Singapore (FAS) under-21 team, Young Lions, are ineligible for any AFC competition spots.)	21	13	7	1	50	19	+31	46	
3	Hougang United	21	10	4	7	48	40	+8	34	Qualification for AFC Cup group stage
4	Tampines Rovers	21	7	6	8	48	51	−3	27	Qualification for AFC Cup group stage
5	Tanjong Pagar United	21	5	7	9	36	49	−13	22	
6	Geylang International	21	6	2	13	33	52	−19	20	
7	Balestier Khalsa	21	5	4	12	34	52	−18	19	
8	Young Lions	21	4	4	13	26	50	−24	16	

Updated to match(es) played on 3 April 2021. Source: Singapore Premier League
Rules for classification: 1) points; 2) goal difference; 3) number of goals scored; 4) number of wins

=== AFC Champions League ===
Pos	Team	Pld	W	D	L	GF	GA	GD	Pts	Qualification	JEO	GAM	CHI	TAM
1	(South Korea) Jeonbuk Hyundai Motors	6	5	1	0	22	5	+17	16	Advance to Round of 16	—	2–1	2–1	9–0
2	(Japan) Gamba Osaka	6	2	3	1	15	7	+8	9		2–2	—	1–1	8–1
3	(Thailand) Chiangrai United	6	2	2	2	8	7	+1	8		1–3	1–1	—	1–0
4	(Singapore) Tampines Rovers	6	0	0	6	1	27	−26	0		0–4	0–2	0–3	—

Source: AFC
Rules for classification: Tiebreakers

Win Draw Loss

==== Group stage ====
25 June 2021 Matchday 1	Tampines Rovers (Singapore)	0–2	(Japan) Gamba Osaka	Tashkent, Uzbekistan
		Report	Patric 26'; Leandro Pereira 88'	Stadium: Bunyodkor Stadium; Attendance: 0 Referee: Nivon Robesh Gamini (Sri Lanka); Man of the Match: (Brazil) Patric

28 June 2021 Matchday 2	Chiangrai United (Thailand)	1–0	(Singapore) Tampines Rovers	Tashkent, Uzbekistan
	Sivakorn Tiatrakul 86'; Phitiwat Sukjitthammakul (yellow card) 31'	Report	Boris Kopitović (yellow card) 35'; Yasir Hanapi (yellow card) 80'	Stadium: Bunyodkor Stadium; Attendance: 0 Referee: Omar Mohamed Al Ali (UAE); Man of the Match: (Thailand) Sivakorn Tiatrakul

1 July 2021 Matchday 3	Jeonbuk Hyundai (South Korea)	9–0	(Singapore) Tampines Rovers	Tashkent, Uzbekistan
	Modou Barrow 5' 54' 75'; Gustavo 14' 15' 57' (pen.) 60'; Kim Seung-dae 35'; Stanislav Iljutcenko 72'	Report	Baihakki Khaizan (yellow card) 74'	Stadium: Lokomotiv Stadium; Attendance: 0 Referee: Ahmad Yaacob (Jordan); Man of the Match: (The Gambia) Modou Barrow

4 July 2021 Matchday 4	Tampines Rovers (Singapore)	0–4	(South Korea) Jeonbuk Hyundai	Tashkent, Uzbekistan
	Zehrudin Mehmedović (yellow card) 52'; Yasir Hanapi (yellow card) 58' (yellow-red card) 60'	Report	Stanislav Iljutcenko 35' 75'; Gustavo 64'; Modou Barrow 73'; Choi Young-jun (yellow card) 56'; Takahiro Kunimoto (yellow card) 58'	Stadium: Bunyodkor Stadium; Attendance: 0 Referee: Masoud Tufayelieh (Syria); Man of the Match: (Russia) Stanislav Iljutcenko

7 July 2021 Matchday 5	Gamba Osaka (Japan)	8–1	(Singapore) Tampines Rovers	Tashkent, Uzbekistan
	Shu Kurata 21'; Shuhei Kawasaki 24' 53' 80'; Kazunari Ichimi 28'; Takashi Usami (penalty missed) 39; Wellington Silva 75' (penalty missed) 62; Patric 78' 87'	Report	Daniel Bennett 27'	Stadium: Bunyodkor Stadium; Referee: Yu Ming Hsun (Chinese Taipei); Man of the Match: (Japan) Shuhei Kawasaki

10 July 2021 Matchday 6	Tampines Rovers (Singapore)	0–3	(Thailand) Chiangrai United	Tashkent, Uzbekistan
	Boris Kopitović (yellow card) 45+2'; Zehrudin Mehmedović (yellow card) 77'	Report	Felipe Amorim 75'; Bill 82' (penalty missed) 45; Phitiwat Sukjitthammakul 90'	Stadium: Lokomotiv Stadium; Referee: Mohd Amirul Izwan Yaacob (Malaysia); Man of the Match: (Brazil) Bill

=== Singapore Cup ===
Win Draw Loss
