= Faizal =

Faizal is a masculine given name. It is also used as a surname. People with the name are as follows:

== Given name ==
=== First name ===
- Faizal Arif (born 1995), Malaysian football player
- Faizal Hamid (born 1981), Singaporean football player
- Faizal Hussein (born 1967), Malaysian actor
- Faizal Kottikollon (born 1963), Indian businessman
- Faizal Maksum (died mid-1930s), a Tajikistani leader of the anti-Soviet Basmachi movement
- Faizal Muhamad (born 1989), Malaysian football player
- Faizal Raffi (born 1996), Singaporean football player
- Faizal Rani (born 1994), Malaysian football player
- Faizal Saari (born 1991), Malaysian hockey player
- Faizal Tahir (born 1978), Malaysian musician
- Faizal Talib (born 1997), Malaysian football player
- Faizal Yusup (1978–2011), Malaysian actor
- Faizal Zainal (born 1974), Malaysian football player

=== Middle name ===
- Ahmad Faizal Azumu (born 1970), Malaysian politician
- Mohamed Faizal Baharom (born 1982), Malaysian weightlifter
- Mohamed Faizal Mohamed Abdul Kadir (born 1980), Singaporean lawyer
- Mohammed Faizal P. P (born 1975), Indian politician

== Surname ==
- Cassim Faizal (born 1957), Sri Lankan politician
- F. S. Faizal, Indian music composer
- Hafiz Faizal (born 1994), Indonesian badminton player
- Hafsah Faizal (born 1993), American designer and author

== Fictional characters ==
- Faizal, one of the major characters in the 2018 Indian film Love Sonia
