= Danish Irfan =

Singaporean association football player

Personal information
- Full name: Danish Irfan Bin Azman
- Date of birth: 10 March 1999 (age 27)
- Place of birth: Singapore
- Height: 1.80 m (5 ft 11 in)
- Positions: Centre-back; left-back

Youth career
- Geylang International Prime League

Senior career*
Years	Team	Apps	(Gls)
2018–2019	Geylang International	36	(0)
2020–2022	Young Lions	18	(0)
2022–	Tampines Rovers	0	(0)
2023–	→ Geylang International (loan)	4	(0)
2024-2025	Hougang United	18	(0)

International career
2017–2018	Singapore U19	7	(0)
2022–	Singapore U23	3	(0)
- * Club domestic league appearances and goals as of 30 April 2022

Danish Irfan bin Azman is a Singaporean professional footballer who plays either as a centre-back or left-back.

He captained the Singapore Under-19 side that participated at the ASEAN Football Federation (AFF) U-19 Championships.

== Club career ==
=== Geylang International ===
Danish returned to Geylang on loan for the 2023 Singapore Premier League season as a defensive rotational option, signing on loan from Tampines Rovers.

=== Hougang United ===
On 8 February 2024, Danish signed for Hougang United for the 2024 campaign from Geylang International. He was the club's 3rd signing announcement, and made his cheetahs debut against Tampines Rovers in a pre-season friendly on 2 March 2024.

== Career statistics ==
As of 21 Sept 2019

Club	Season	S.League		Singapore Cup		Singapore League Cup		Asia		Total	
Club	Season	Apps	Goals	Apps	Goals	Apps	Goals	Apps	Goals	Apps	Goals
Geylang International	2018	17	0	2	0	0	0	0	0	19	0
Geylang International	2019	19	0	0	0	0	0	0	0	19	0
Geylang International	Total	36	0	2	0	0	0	0	0	38	0
Young Lions FC	2020	9	0	0	0	0	0	0	0	9	0
Young Lions FC	2021	9	0	0	0	0	0	0	0	9	0
Young Lions FC	2022	0	0	0	0	0	0	0	0	0	0
Young Lions FC	Total	18	0	0	0	0	0	0	0	18	0
Tampines Rovers	2022	0	0	0	0	0	0	0	0	0	0
Tampines Rovers	2023	0	0	0	0	0	0	0	0	0	0
Tampines Rovers	Total	0	0	0	0	0	0	0	0	0	0
Geylang International	2023	4	0	2	0	0	0	0	0	6	0
Geylang International	Total	4	0	2	0	0	0	0	0	6	0
Hougang United	2024–25	0	0	0	0	0	0	0	0	0	0
Hougang United	Total	0	0	0	0	0	0	0	0	0	0
Career total		58	0	4	0	0	0	0	0	62	0
