= Shameer Aziq =

Singaporean footballer

Personal information
- Full name: Muhammad Shameer Aziq Bin Abdul Razak
- Date of birth: 30 December 1995 (age 30)
- Place of birth: Singapore
- Height: 1.63 m (5 ft 4 in)
- Position: Forward

Team information
- Current team: Warwick Knights

Senior career*
Years	Team	Apps	(Gls)
2012–2013	Hougang United	1	(0)
2014–2017	Young Lions	31	(6)
2014–2017	Tampines Rovers	0	(0)
2022	Tampines Rovers	0	(0)
2023–	Warwick Knights	0	(0)

International career^{‡}
2014–	Singapore U23		
2014–	Singapore	2	(0)
- * Club domestic league appearances and goals as of 05:26, 24 November 2014 (UTC) ‡ National team caps and goals as of 05:26, 24 November 2014 (UTC)

Muhammad Shameer Aziq Bin Abdul Razak (born 30 December 1995) is a Singapore international footballer who last played as a defender for SFL1 club Warwick Knights.

== Club career ==
Shameer Aziq played for S.League club Hougang United before joining under-23 developmental side Courts Young Lions in 2014.

== International career ==
=== Youth ===
Shameer Aziq represented Singapore U23 at the 2014 Asian Games.

=== Senior ===
Shameer was first called up to the national team against Papua New Guinea and Hong Kong in 2014. He made his senior international debut in the 92nd minute, replacing Fazrul Nawaz in a friendly match against Papua New Guinea on 6 September 2014. He made his second international cap a few days later against Hong Kong in a 0-0 draw.

== Career statistics ==
=== Club ===
As of match played November 2016. Caps and goals may not be correct.

Club	Season	S.League		Singapore Cup		Singapore League Cup		Asia		Total	
Club	Season	Apps	Goals	Apps	Goals	Apps	Goals	Apps	Goals	Apps	Goals
Hougang United	2012	1	0	0	0	0	0	—		1	0
Hougang United	2013	0	0	0	0	0	0	—		0	0
Hougang United	Total	1	0	0	0	0	0	0	0	1	0
Young Lions	2014	16	2	0	0	0	0	—		16	2
Young Lions	2015	15	4	0	0	0	0	—		15	4
Young Lions	2016	0	0	0	0	0	0	—		0	0
Young Lions	2017	0	0	0	0	0	0	—		0	0
Young Lions	Total	31	6	0	0	0	0	0	0	31	6
Career total		32	6	0	0	0	0	0	0	32	6

=== International ===
As of 24 November 2014

No	Date	Venue	Opponent	Result	Competition
1	6 September 2014	Hougang Stadium, Hougang, Singapore	Papua New Guinea	2–1 (won)	Friendly
2	9 September 2014	Hougang Stadium, Hougang, Singapore	Hong Kong	0–0 (draw)	Friendly

International caps

Singapore national team
Year	Apps	Goals
2014	2	0
Total	2	0

U23 International goals

No	Date	Venue	Opponent	Score	Result	Competition
1	20 July 2014	Flachau, Austria	(Germany) TSV Freilassing	5-0	5-0	Friendly Game
