= Amirul Haikal =

Singaporean footballer

Personal information
- Full name: Muhammad Amirul Haikal bin Mohamed Hassim
- Date of birth: 14 November 1999 (age 26)
- Position: Midfielder

Team information
- Current team: Tampines Rovers
- Number: 12

Senior career*
Years	Team	Apps	(Gls)
2017–2020	Young Lions FC	14	(1)
2021–	Tampines Rovers	43	(0)

International career
2017	Singapore U19	2	(0)
2023-	Singapore	1	(0)
- * Club domestic league appearances and goals as of 3 Feb 2021

Muhammad Amirul Haikal bin Mohamed Hassim (born 14 November 1999) is a Singaporean professional footballer who plays as a midfielder for Singapore Premier League side Tampines Rovers and the Singapore national team.

== Career statistics ==
=== Club ===
As of 16 March 2022.

Club	Season	League			Cup		Continental		Other		Total	
Club	Season	Division	Apps	Goals	Apps	Goals	Apps	Goals	Apps	Goals	Apps	Goals
Young Lions	2017	S.League	0	0	0	0	0	0	0	0	0	0
Young Lions	2018	Singapore Premier League	3	1	0	0	0	0	0	0	3	1
Young Lions	2020	Singapore Premier League	11	0	0	0	0	0	0	0	11	0
Young Lions	Total		14	1	0	0	0	0	0	0	14	1
Tampines Rovers	2021	Singapore Premier League	15	0	0	0	4	0	0	0	19	0
Tampines Rovers	2022	Singapore Premier League	22	0	5	0	2	0	0	0	29	0
Tampines Rovers	2023	Singapore Premier League	2	0	0	0	0	0	0	0	2	0
Tampines Rovers	Total		39	0	5	0	6	0	0	0	50	0
Career total			53	1	5	0	6	0	0	0	64	1

== Honours ==
=== Tampines Rovers ===
- Singapore Community Shield: 2025
