= Irfan Najeeb =

Singaporean footballer

Personal information
- Full name: Mohammad Irfan bin Mohammad Najeeb
- Date of birth: 31 July 1999 (age 27)
- Place of birth: Singapore
- Positions: Right-back; centre-back

Team information
- Current team: Tampines Rovers
- Number: 23

Youth career
- –2017: National Football Academy

Senior career*
Years	Team	Apps	(Gls)
2018–	Tampines Rovers	93	(7)
2019–2020	→ Young Lions (loan)	19	(0)

International career^{‡}
2017–2018	Singapore U19	3	(0)
2019–	Singapore U23	12	(0)
2019–	Singapore	15	(1)
Medal record
Men's football
Representing Singapore
Merlion Cup
Winner	2019 Singapore
- * Club domestic league appearances and goals as of 3 November 2019 ‡ National team caps and goals as of 15 October 2025

Mohammad Irfan bin Mohammad Najeeb (born 31 July 1999), better known as Irfan Najeeb, is a Singaporean footballer who plays either as a right-back or centre-back for Singapore Premier League club Tampines Rovers and the Singapore national team.

== Club career ==
Najeeb started playing football at the age of seven. He was part of the National Football Academy squad in 2017.

=== Tampines Rovers ===
In January 2018, Irfan joined Tampines Rovers for the inaugural 2018 Singapore Premier League season. He make his debut on 31 March playing the full match against Albirex Niigata (S). On 2 May, he scored his first professional goal scoring the only goal in the match in a 1–0 win over Balestier Khalsa.

On 6 January 2021, Irfan was registered for the 2021 Singapore Premier League season. On 28 June 2021, Irfan make his AFC Champions League debut coming on as a substitute against Chiangrai United. 4 days later on 1 July 2023, he played the full match against Jeonbuk Hyundai Motors.

On 17 May 2024, Irfan make his 100th appearance for the club in the Eastern Derby against Geylang International. On 30 June, he scored a brace in a 5–1 thrashing win over Hougang United.

==== Young Lions (loan) ====
In January 2019, Irfan moved to Young Lions on loan to get more game time. In 2020, he rarely played for the club as he was going through National Service.

== International career ==
On 23 March 2023, Irfan made his International debut against Hong Kong at the Mong Kok Stadium playing the full match.

On 18 June 2023, Irfan recorded his first international assist for Shawal Anuar in a 1–1 draw against Solomon Islands.

On 18 November 2024, he scored his first international goal in a 3–2 loss to Chinese Taipei.

== Personal life ==
Irfan is the nephew of Singaporean legend, Shahril Ishak.

From January 2019 to December 2020, he completed two years of national service.

== Career statistics ==
=== Club ===
As of 23 July 2024

Club	Season	League			Cup		Continental		Other		Total	
Club	Season	Division	Apps	Goals	Apps	Goals	Apps	Goals	Apps	Goals	Apps	Goals
Tampines Rovers	2018	Singapore Premier League	16	2	2 (Note: Appearances in the Singapore Cup)	0	6 (Note: 5 appearances and one goal in the AFC Cup, one appearance in the AFC Champions League)	1	0	0	24	3
Tampines Rovers	Total		16	2	2	1	0	0	0	0	24	3
Young Lions (loan)	2019	Singapore Premier League	13	0	0	0	0	0	0	0	13	0
Young Lions (loan)	2020	Singapore Premier League	6	0	0	0	0	0	0	0	6	0
Young Lions (loan)	Total		19	0	0	0	0	0	0	0	19	0
Tampines Rovers	2021	Singapore Premier League	11	0	0	0	0	0	4	0	15	0
Tampines Rovers	2022	Singapore Premier League	22	0	0	0	0	0	2	0	24	0
Tampines Rovers	2023	Singapore Premier League	22	0	7	0	0	0	1	0	30	0
Tampines Rovers	2024–25	Singapore Premier League	17	4	0	0	0	0	4	0	21	4
Tampines Rovers	Total		72	4	7	0	0	0	11	0	92	4
Career total			107	5	9	0	6	1	11	0	128	6

== Career statistics ==
=== International ===
As of match played 31 May 2026

Appearances and goals by national team and year
National team	Year	Apps	Goals
Singapore	2023	3	0
Singapore	2024	5	1
Singapore	2025	6	0
Singapore	2026	1	0
Total		15	1

Scores and results list Singapore's goal tally first, score column indicates score after each Najeeb goal.

List of international goals scored by Irfan Najib
No.	Date	Venue	Opponent	Score	Result	Competition
1	18 November 2024	National Stadium, Kallang, Singapore	Chinese Taipei	1–2	2–3	Friendly

== Honours ==
Singapore U22

- Merlion Cup: 2019
