= Nazrul Nazari =

Singaporean footballer (born 1991)

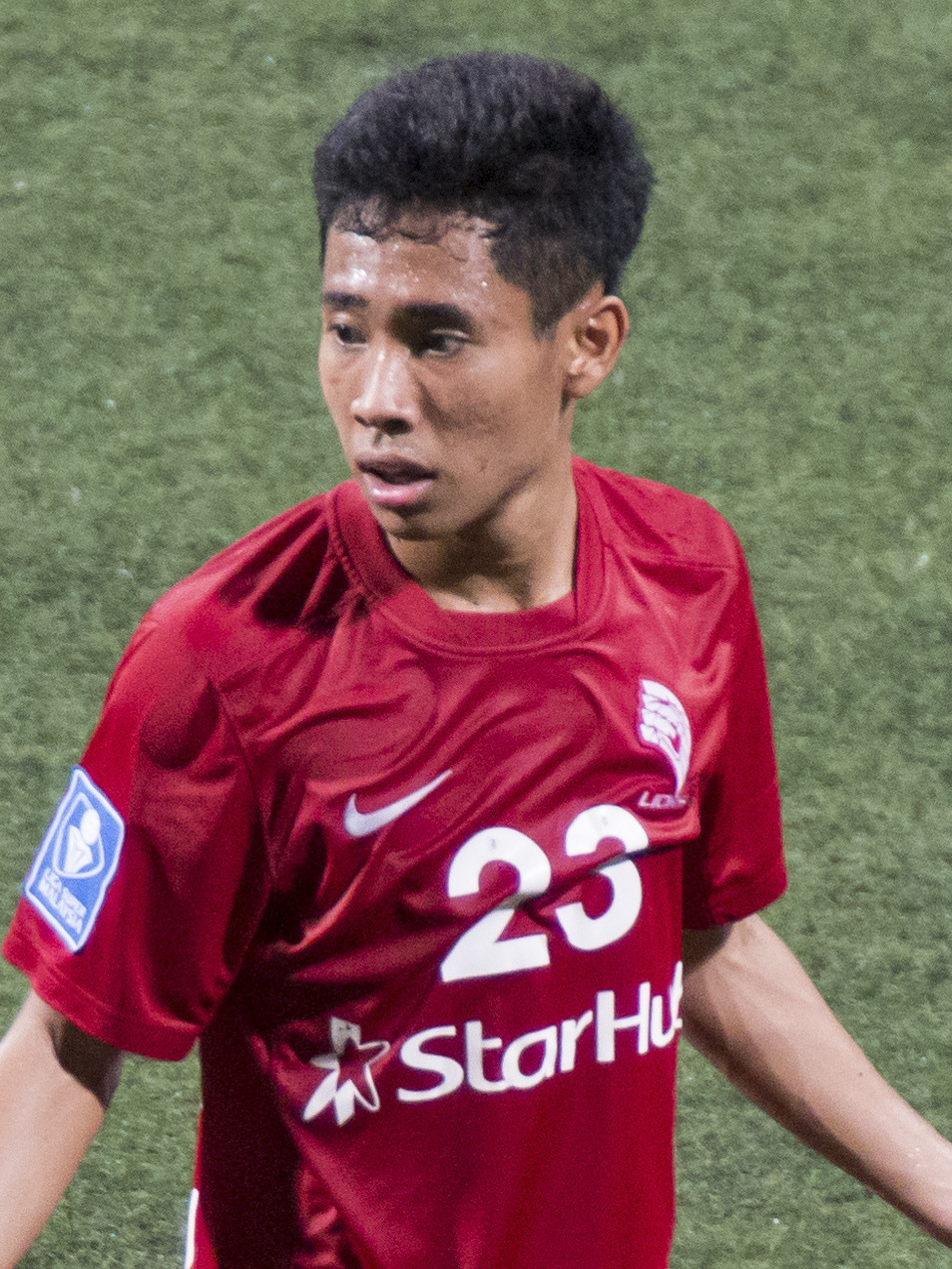
- Nazrul playing for LionsXII in 2013

Personal information
- Full name: Muhammad Nazrul bin Ahmad Nazari
- Date of birth: 11 February 1991 (age 35)
- Place of birth: Singapore
- Height: 1.63 m (5 ft 4 in)
- Positions: Full-back; winger

Team information
- Current team: Geylang International
- Number: 23

Senior career*
Years	Team	Apps	(Gls)
2009–2012	Young Lions	68	(8)
2013–2015	LionsXII	23	(2)
2016–2025	Hougang United	210	(9)
2025–	Geylang International	7	(0)

International career^{‡}
2012–	Singapore	68	(0)
Medal record
Men's football
Representing Singapore
Sea Games
Bronze medal – third place	Naypyidaw 2013	Football
- * Club domestic league appearances and goals as of 2 August 2023 ‡ National team caps and goals as of 14 December 2024

Muhammad Nazrul bin Ahmad Nazari (born 11 February 1991), better known as Nazrul Nazari or just Nazrul, is a Singaporean professional footballer who plays either as a full-back or winger for Singapore Premier League club Geylang International and the Singapore national team.

Nazrul is holds the record for being Hougang United all-time most appearances in history.

== Club career ==
=== Young Lions ===
Nazrul began his professional football career with Under-23 side Young Lions in the S.League in 2009.

=== LionsXII ===
In December 2011, the FAS announced that Nazrul was to join the newly formed LionsXII for the 2012 Malaysia Super League.

=== Hougang United ===
In 2016, Nazrul signed for Hougang United for the 2016 S.League campaign after LionsXII was disbanded in 2015. On 19 November 2022, Nazrul captained Hougang United to win the 2022 Singapore Cup, helping the Cheetahs clinch their first ever piece of silverware.

On 26 February 2023, Nazrul became the fourth most capped player in Hougang after his start against Balestier Khalsa saw him reach 150 appearances, he capped his milestone with an assist for the opening goal. On 3 June 2023, Nazrul scored the second goal against Young Lions.

Nazrul start against the same opposition in Round 3 saw him joint third with Nurhilmi Jasni with 165 appearances and he would break that number and be the second most capped player after playing against the Young Lions.

On 30 June 2025, it was announced that Nazrul would be leaving the club after 9 seasons upon the expiry of his contract, leaving as the club’s all time highest appearance maker with 210 apps in all competitions.

=== Geylang International ===
On 7 July 2025, Nazrul alongside his teammate, Shodai Yokoyama, signed with Geylang International.

== International career ==
Nazrul made his international debut for Singapore in a friendly match against Hong Kong on 15 August 2012, since then Nazrul has been a consistent member of the squad since his debut and has amassed 60 appearances for the Lions.

In 2022, Nazrul was included in the team for the 2022 FAS Tri-Nations Series and 2022 AFF Championship.

== Career statistics ==
=== Club ===
As of match played 10 Sept 2026. Caps and goals may not be correct.

Club	Season	S.League		Singapore Cup		Singapore League Cup		Asia		Total	
Club	Season	Apps	Goals	Apps	Goals	Apps	Goals	Apps	Goals	Apps	Goals
Young Lions	2009	10	1	0	0	-	-	—		10	1
Young Lions	2010	20	3	3	0	—		—		23	3
Young Lions	2011	26	3	—		-	-	—		26	3
Young Lions	2012	10	1	0	0	4	0	—		14	1
Young Lions	Total	66	8	3	0	4	0	0	0	73	8
Club	Season	Malaysia Super League		Malaysia FA Cup		Malaysia Cup		Asia		Total	
LionsXII	2013	15	1	0	0	6	0	—		21	1
LionsXII	2014	8	1	1	0	0	0	—		9	1
LionsXII	2015	??	??	??	??	??	??	—		??	??
LionsXII	Total	23	2	1	0	6	0	0	0	30	2
Club	Season	S.League		Singapore Cup		Singapore League Cup		Asia		Total	
Hougang United	2016	23	0	-	-	0	0	—		23	0
Hougang United	2017	20	3	5	0	3	0	—		28	3
Hougang United	2018	16	0	2	0	0	0	—		18	0
Hougang United	2019	18	2	3	0	0	0	—		21	2
Hougang United	2020	14	0	0	0	0	0	3	0	17	0
Hougang United	2021	12	1	0	0	0	0	0	0	12	1
Hougang United	2022	22	1	3	0	0	0	3	0	28	1
Hougang United	2023	21	2	6	0	1	0	6	0	32	2
Hougang United	2024–25	24	0	4	0	0	0	0	0	28	0
Hougang United	Total	170	9	23	0	4	0	12	0	197	9
Geylang International	2025–26	20	0	4	0	0	0	0	0	24	0
Geylang International	2026–27	0	0	0	0	0	0	0	0	0	0
Geylang International	Total	20	0	4	0	0	0	0	0	24	0
Career total		243	15	24	0	11	0	12	0	287	16

- Young Lions and LionsXII are ineligible for qualification to AFC competitions in their respective leagues.
- Young Lions withdrew from the 2011 and 2012 Singapore Cup, and the 2011 Singapore League Cup due to participation in AFC and AFF youth competitions.

=== International ===
Appearances and goals by national team and year
National team	Year	Apps	Goals
Singapore
Singapore	2012	3	0
Singapore	2015	10	0
Singapore	2016	3	0
Singapore	2017	6	0
Singapore	2018	7	0
Singapore	2019	9	0
Singapore	2021	10	0
Singapore	2022	1	0
Total		49	0

=== International caps ===
No	Date	Venue	Opponent	Result	Competition
40	3 June 2021	King Fahd International Stadium, Riyadh, Saudi Arabia	Palestine	0-4 (lost)	2022 FIFA World Cup qualification – AFC second round
43	11 November 2021	Al Hamriya Sports Club Stadium, Sharjah, UAE	Kyrgyzstan	1-2 (lost)	Friendly
44	5 December 2021	National Stadium, Kallang, Singapore	Myanmar	3-0(won)	2020 AFF Championship
45	8 December 2021	National Stadium, Kallang, Singapore	Philippines	2-1(won)	2020 AFF Championship
46	14 December 2021	National Stadium, Kallang, Singapore	Timor-Leste	2-0(won)	2020 AFF Championship
47	22 December 2021	National Stadium, Kallang, Singapore	Indonesia	1-1(draw)	2020 AFF Championship
48	25 December 2021	National Stadium, Kallang, Singapore	Indonesia	2-4 (lost)	2020 AFF Championship
51	1 June 2022	Al Nahyan Stadium, Abu Dhabi, United Arab Emirates	Kuwait	0–2 (lost)	Friendly
52	8 June 2022	Dolen Omurzakov Stadium, Bishkek, Kyrgyzstan	Kyrgyzstan	1–2 (lost)	2023 AFC Asian Cup qualification
53	11 June 2022	Dolen Omurzakov Stadium, Bishkek, Kyrgyzstan	Tajikistan	0–1 (lost)	2023 AFC Asian Cup qualification
54	14 June 2022	Dolen Omurzakov Stadium, Bishkek, Kyrgyzstan	Myanmar	6–2 (won)	2023 AFC Asian Cup qualification
55	21 Sept 2022	Thống Nhất Stadium, Ho Chi Minh City, Vietnam	Vietnam	0-4 (lost)	2022 VFF Tri-Nations Series
56	24 Sept 2022	Thống Nhất Stadium, Ho Chi Minh City, Vietnam	India	1-1 (draw)	2022 VFF Tri-Nations Series
57	24 December 2022	Jalan Besar Stadium, Kallang, Singapore	Myanmar	3-2(won)	2022 AFF Championship
58	27 December 2022	New Laos National Stadium, Vientiane, Laos	Laos	2-0(won)	2022 AFF Championship

=== International goals ===
Scores and results list Singapore's goal tally first.

No	Date	Venue	Opponent	Score	Result	Competition
1.	6 June 2017	Jalan Besar Stadium, Kallang, Singapore	Myanmar	1–1	1–1	Friendly

== Honours ==
=== Club ===
LionsXII

- Malaysia Super League: 2013
- FA Cup Malaysia: 2015

Hougang United

- Singapore Cup Champions (1): 2022
- Singapore Cup Runner-ups (1): 2023

=== Individual ===
- Singapore Premier League Team of the Year: 2019
