= Firdaus Kasman =

Singaporean footballer

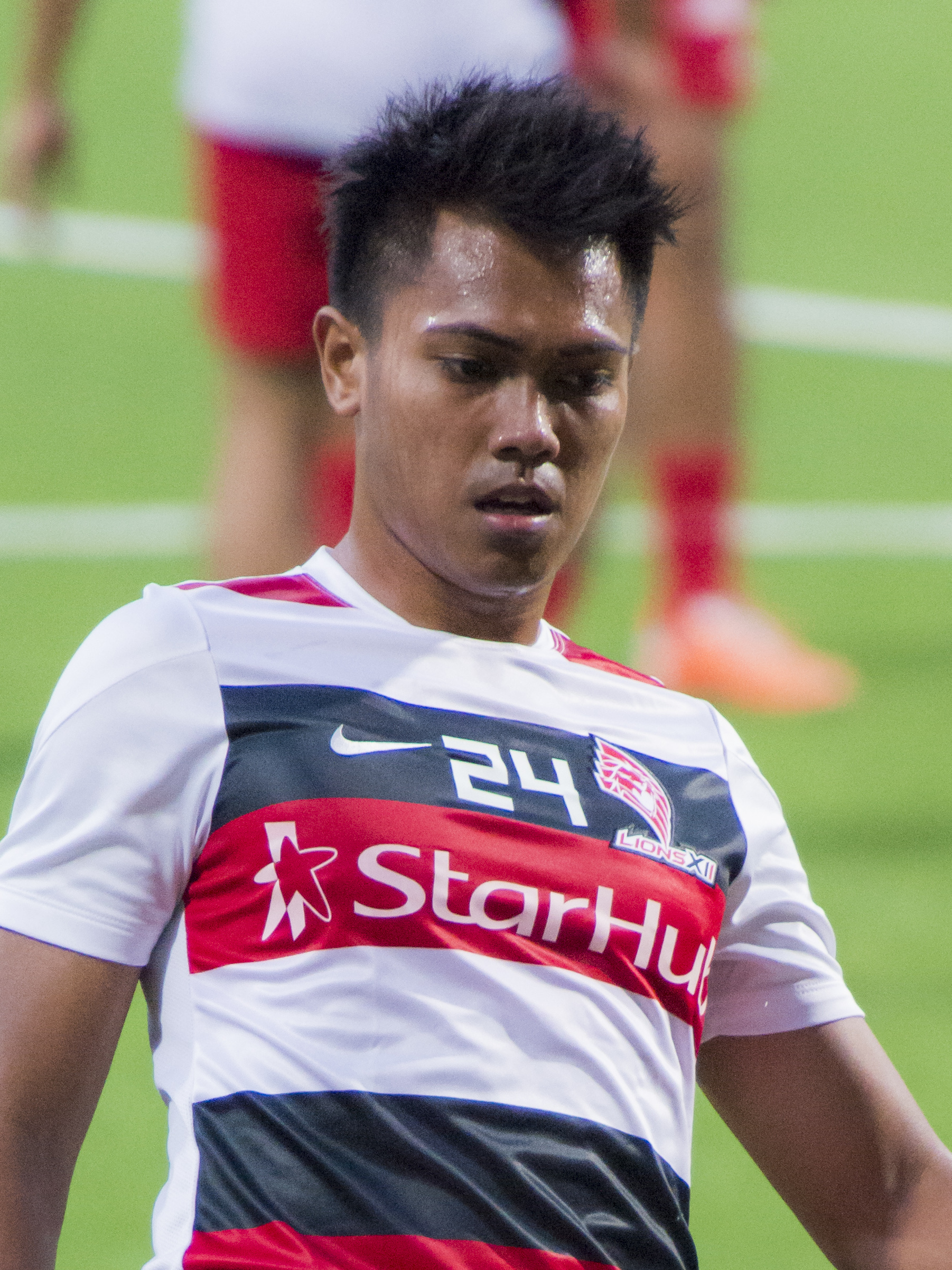
- Firdaus playing for LionsXII in 2014

Personal information
- Full name: Mohammad Firdaus bin Kasman
- Date of birth: 24 January 1988 (age 38)
- Place of birth: Singapore
- Height: 1.73 m (5 ft 8 in)
- Position: Midfielder

Team information
- Current team: Yishun Sentek Mariners
- Number: 21

Senior career*
| Years | Team | Apps | (Gls) |
| 2007 | Tampines Rovers | 8 | (0) |
| 2008 | Young Lions | 29 | (5) |
| 2009–2010 | Tampines Rovers | 18 | (0) |
| 2010–2011 | Home United | 25 | (3) |
| 2011–2012 | Tampines Rovers | 30 | (6) |
| 2012–2013 | LionsXII | 19 | (0) |
| 2013–2014 | Tampines Rovers | 28 | (0) |
| 2014 | → LionsXII (loan) | 3 | (0) |
| 2015 | LionsXII | | |
| 2016 | Young Lions | 19 | (1) |
| 2017–2018 | Warriors | 8 | (0) |
| 2019–2021 | Geylang International | 51 | (1) |
| 2022–2023 | Tampines Rovers | 18 | (2) |

International career^{‡}
| 2012– | Singapore | 8 | (0) |
- * Club domestic league appearances and goals as of 14 May 2021 ‡ National team caps and goals as of 11 October 2019

Mohammad Firdaus bin Kasman (born 24 January 1988) is a Singapore international footballer who plays as a midfielder for Tampines Rovers in the Singapore Premier League.

== Club career ==
=== Tampines Rovers ===
Firdaus began his professional football career with Tampines Rovers in the S.League in 2007.

=== Young Lions ===
In 2008, Firdaus signed for Young Lions.

=== Return to Tampines Rovers ===
In 2009, Firdaus return to Tampines Rovers.

=== Home United ===
In 2010, Firdaus signed for Home United.

=== Third spell atTampines Rovers ===
Firdaus returned to Tampines Rovers for the 2011, 2012 S.League and 2013 S.League season after joining Home United in 2011 and LionsXII in 2012.

=== LionsXII ===
In December 2011, the FAS announced that Firdaus was to join the newly formed LionsXII for the 2012 Malaysia Super League. He was on loan by LionsXII in 2014 after joining Tampines Rovers in 2013. He later joined LionsXII permanently in 2015.

=== Young Lions ===
After LionsXII was disbanded, Firdaus signed for Young Lions in 2016, although he was overaged together with Khairul Amri.

=== Warriors ===
Firdaus signed for the Warriors in 2017.

=== Geylang International ===
Firdaus signed for Geylang International in 2019, and left at the end of the 2021 Singapore Premier League season.

=== Fifth spells at Tampines Rovers ===
Firdaus once again returned to Tampines Rovers for the 2022 Singapore Premier League season, following the end of his contract at Geylang International. On 16 December 2023, the club announced that he will leave the club at the end of the 2023 season.

== Honours ==
=== International caps ===
| No | Date | Venue | Opponent | Result | Competition |
|---|---|---|---|---|---|
| 7 | 6 October 2019 | Amman International Stadium, Amman, Jordan | Jordan | 0–0 (draw) | Exhibition game |

Singapore

- AFF Championship: 2012

== Controversy ==
In 2012, Firdaus was fined by the Football Association of Singapore for allegedly being involved in a theft incident on 4 February at Clarke Quay.
