= Adam Reefdy =

Singaporean footballer

Personal information
- Full name: Adam Reefdy bin Muhammad Hasyim
- Date of birth: 8 May 2004 (age 22)
- Place of birth: Singapore
- Height: 1.70 m (5 ft 7 in)
- Positions: Full-back; centre-back

Team information
- Current team: Hougang United
- Number: 69

Youth career
- –2020: Singapore Sports School

Senior career*
Years	Team	Apps	(Gls)
2021–	Tampines Rovers	13	(0)
2023–	Young Lions (loan)	7	(0)

International career
2019	Singapore U16	2	(0)
2023–	Singapore U23	4	(0)
- * Club domestic league appearances and goals as of 15:04, 14 May 2021 (UTC)

Adam Reefdy bin Muhammad Hasyim (born 8 May 2004), better known as Adam Reefdy, is a Singaporean professional footballer who plays either as a full-back or centre-back for Singapore Premier League club Hougang United and the Singapore U23.

== Career statistics ==
=== Club ===
As of 6 Jul 2022

Club	Season	League			Cup		Asia		Total	
Club	Season	Division	Apps	Goals	Apps	Goals	Apps	Goals	Apps	Goals
Tampines Rovers	2021	Singapore Premier League	1	0	0	0	1	0	2	0
Tampines Rovers	2022	Singapore Premier League	12	0	0	0	2	0	14	0
Tampines Rovers	Total		13	0	0	0	3	0	16	0
Career total			13	0	0	0	3	0	16	0
