= Taufik Suparno =

Singaporean footballer

Personal information
- Full name: Mohamad Taufik bin Suparno
- Date of birth: 31 October 1995 (age 31)
- Place of birth: Singapore
- Height: 1.65 m (5 ft 5 in)
- Positions: Winger; striker

Team information
- Current team: Tanjong Pagar United
- Number: 13

Youth career
- National Football Academy

Senior career*
Years	Team	Apps	(Gls)
2014	Tampines Rovers	1	(0)
2015–2017	Young Lions	26	(4)
2018–2026	Tampines Rovers	122	(38)
2026–	Tanjong Pagar United	0	(0)

International career^{‡}
2017	Singapore U22	4	(0)
2022–	Singapore	14	(0)
- * Club domestic league appearances and goals as of 27 November 2016 ‡ National team caps and goals as of 5 June 2025

Mohamad Taufik bin Suparno (born 31 October 1995) is a Singaporean professional footballer who plays either as a winger or a striker for Singapore Premier League club Tanjong Pagar United and the Singapore national team.

== Club career ==
=== Tampines Rovers ===
Taufik began his club career with S.League club Tampines Rovers in 2014. However, he made only one appearance for the club on 18 October 2014 against Balestier Khalsa.

=== Young Lions ===
In 2015, Taufik signed for Young Lions and extended his contract up to 2017 when he rejoined his first club Tampines .

=== Returned to Tampines Rovers ===
In August 2018, Taufik returned to Tampines Rovers midway throughout the 2018 season. On 13 August 2018, he played his first match since his returned to the club in a league match against Hougang United.

On 8 March 2019, he scored his first goal and also recorded an assist in a 5–1 win against Home United.

The 2021 Singapore Premier League season saw Taufik appearing in 21 matches but only made the starting line-up thrice and scored on six occasions. He suffered an injury midway in the season which he didn't appeared in all of the club 2021 AFC Champions League group stage matches.

Taufik enjoyed a superb start to the 2022 season, scoring 3 goals in his first 3 appearances, earning a call-up to the Singapore national team. Taufik ended the 2022 season as the 3rd highest local goalscorer with 12 goals in 27 games for the stags.

On 17 May 2024, Taufik came on as a substitution in the Eastern Derby against Geylang International where his team was losing 4–2 in which he scored two goals in the 82nd and 84th minute to rescued his team to a 4–4 draw.

== International career ==
Taufik was first called up to the Singapore national team in 2015 by head coach Bernd Stange for the 2018 FIFA World Cup qualification matches against Japan and Syria on 12 and 17 October 2015 respectively. However, Taufik did not get a chance to make his international debut for both matches.

Taufik made his full debut for Singapore on 26 March 2022, in a 2–1 win against Malaysia at the 2022 FAS Tri-Nations Series.

Taufik got called up again for Singapore in the 2023 AFC Asian Cup qualifications fixtures. He was on the starting line up against Kyrgyzstan.

== Others ==
=== Singapore Selection Squad ===
He was selected as part of the Singapore Selection squad for The Sultan of Selangor's Cup to be held on 6 May 2017.

=== Javanese Ancestry ===
He also has Javanese ancestry inherited from his father.

== Career statistics ==
=== Club ===
As of match played 28 July 2022. Caps and goals may not be correct. Career caps and goals does not include 2016 S.League statistics.

Club	Season	S.League		Singapore Cup		Singapore League Cup		Asia		Total	
Club	Season	Apps	Goals	Apps	Goals	Apps	Goals	Apps	Goals	Apps	Goals
Tampines Rovers	2014	1	0	-	-	-	-	—		1	0
Tampines Rovers	Total	1	0	0	0	0	0	0	0	1	0
Young Lions	2015	6	2	-	-	-	-	—		6	2
Young Lions	2016	0	0	0	0	0	0	—		0	0
Young Lions	2017	20	2	0	0	0	0	—		20	2
Young Lions	Total	26	4	0	0	0	0	0	0	26	4
Tampines Rovers	2018	4	0	1	0	-	-	-	-	5	0
Tampines Rovers	2019	24	3	6	1	0	0	6	0	37	4
Tampines Rovers	2020	12	3	0	0	1	0	3	0	16	3
Tampines Rovers	2021	20	6	0	0	0	0	0	0	20	6
Tampines Rovers	2022	27	12	6	3	0	0	2	0	35	15
Tampines Rovers	2023	19	2	0	0	0	0	0	0	19	2
Tampines Rovers	2024–25	27	6	6	0	0	0	6	0	39	6
Tampines Rovers	2025–26	15	0	3	0	1	0	10	1	29	1
Tampines Rovers	Total	147	32	22	4	2	0	25	1	197	37
Tanjong Pagar United	2026–27	0	0	0	0	0	0	0	0	0	0
Tanjong Pagar United	Total	0	0	0	0	0	0	0	0	0	0
Career Total		175	36	22	4	2	0	25	1	224	41

- Young Lions are ineligible for qualification to AFC competitions in their respective leagues.

=== International ===
Appearances and goals by national team and year
National team	Year	Apps	Goals
Singapore	2022	5	0
Singapore	2023	1	0
Total		6	0

== Honours ==
=== Club ===
Tampines Rovers

- Singapore Cup: 2019
- Singapore Community Shield: 2020, 2025
