= 2022 Balestier Khalsa FC season =

Balestier Khalsa
2022 season
- Chairman: S Thavaneson
- Head coach: (Singapore) Akbar Nawas
- Stadium: Bishan Stadium
- Singapore Premier League: 7th
- Singapore Cup: 4th
- Top goalscorer: League: (Japan) Shuhei Hoshino (18 goals); All: (Japan) Shuhei Hoshino (20 goals)

The 2022 season was Balestier Khalsa's 27th consecutive season in the top flight of Singapore football and in the Singapore Premier League and the Singapore Cup.

== Squad ==
=== Singapore Premier League ===
As of 4 January 2022

No.	Name	Nationality	Date of birth (age)	Previous club	Contract since	Contract end
Goalkeepers
1	Hairul Syirhan	(Singapore)	21 August 1995 (age 31)	(Singapore) Geylang International	2022	2022
18	Kimura Riki ^{U23}	(Singapore)	14 November 2000 (age 26)	(Singapore) Lion City Sailors	2021	2022
20	Rudy Khairullah	(Singapore)	19 July 1994 (age 32)	(Singapore) Lion City Sailors	2022	2022
Defenders
3	Keshav Kumar ^{U23}	(Singapore)	6 February 2001 (age 25)	Youth Team	2020	2022
4	Delwinder Singh	(Singapore)	5 August 1992 (age 34)	(Singapore) Tanjong Pagar United	2022	2022
5	Ensar Brunčević	(Serbia)	13 February 1999 (age 27)	(Serbia) FK Spartak Subotica II (T2)	2020	2022
13	Amer Hakeem	(Singapore)	8 November 1998 (age 28)	(Singapore) Young Lions FC	2021	2022
15	Khalili Khalif ^{U23}	(Singapore)	3 January 1997 (age 29)	(Singapore) SAFSA (NFL)	2022	2022
16	Darren Teh	(Singapore)	9 September 1996 (age 30)	(Singapore) Geylang International	2022	2023
24	Ho Wai Loon	(Singapore)	20 August 1993 (age 33)	(Singapore) Lion City Sailors	2021	2023
27	Akmal Azman ^{U23}	(Singapore)	21 November 2000 (age 25)	(Singapore) Tampines Rovers	2021	2021
29	Aidil Johari ^{U23}	(Singapore)	5 April 2003 (age 23)	Youth Team	2021	2022
33	Madhu Mohana ^{>30}	(Singapore)	6 March 1991 (age 35)	(Singapore) Tampines Rovers	2022	2022
39	Aiman Zavyan ^{U23}	(Singapore)	7 June 2002 (age 24)	(Singapore) Geylang International U19	2020	2022
Midfielders
6	Aarish Kumar ^{U23}	(Singapore)	19 May 1999 (age 27)	(Singapore) Warriors FC	2020	2022
7	Daniel Goh ^{U23}	(Singapore)	13 August 1999 (age 27)	(Singapore) Young Lions FC	2022	2022
8	Ammirul Emmran	(Singapore)	18 April 1995 (age 31)	(Singapore) Tanjong Pagar United	2022	2022
14	Hariysh Krishnakumar ^{U23}	(Singapore)	23 October 2002 (age 24)	(Singapore) Geylang International U19	2021	2022
17	Naufal Azman	(Singapore)	10 July 1998 (age 28)	(Singapore) Hougang United	2022	2022
19	Asshukrie Wahid	(Singapore)	27 February 1998 (age 28)	(Singapore) Geylang International	2022	2022
28	Gareth Low	(Singapore)	28 February 1997 (age 29)	(Japan) Albirex Niigata (S)	2021	2022
30	Ignatius Ang	(Singapore)	12 November 1992 (age 34)	(Singapore) Tanjong Pagar United	2022	2022
Forwards
9	Shuhei Hoshino	(Japan)	19 December 1995 (age 30)	(South Korea) Busan Transportation CFC	2020	2022
10	Ryoya Tanigushi	(Japan)	31 August 1999 (age 27)	(Japan) Albirex Niigata (S)	2022	2022
11	Kuraba Kondo	(Japan)	6 July 2002 (age 24)	(Japan) Albirex Niigata (S)	2022	2022
22	Puvan Raj Sivalingam ^{U23}	(Singapore)	29 August 2001 (age 25)	Youth Team	2020	2022
23	Syukri Noorhaizam ^{U23}	(Singapore)	14 December 1999 (age 26)	(Singapore) Tiong Bahru FC (NFL)	2020	2022
Players who left during season
12	Martyn Mun ^{U23}	(Singapore)	7 January 2000 (age 26)	(Singapore) Young Lions FC	2020	2022

=== Women Team ===
No.	Name	Nationality	Date of birth (age)	Previous club	Contract since	Contract end
Goalkeepers
1	Nur Izyan Ahmad	(Singapore)		(Singapore) Simei United	2022	2022
25	Hazel Lim Ya Ting	(Singapore)	3 March 2002 (age 24)	(Singapore)	2022	2022
36	Erlinawaty Dewi	(Singapore)		(Singapore)	2022	2022
Defenders
3	Nur Saibah	(Singapore)		(Singapore) Simei United FC	2022	2022
5	Nur Syahirah Rahman	(Singapore)		(Singapore)	2022	2022
15	Nur Fathimah Syaakirah	(Singapore)		(Singapore)	2022	2022
16	Siti Nurerwadah Erwan	(Singapore)	26 June 2004 (age 22)	(Singapore)	2022	2022
17	Sharifah Nuratuhasikin	(Singapore)		(Singapore)	2022	2022
18	Nur Syafiqah Peer	(Singapore)	4 October 1996 (age 30)	(Singapore) Tanjong Pagar United	2022	2022
19	Nur Azima Ahmad	(Singapore)		(Singapore)	2022	2022
22	Nasriah Ibrahim	(Singapore)		(Singapore)	2022	2022
23	Nur Aniqah Imana	(Singapore)		(Singapore) Simei United FC	2022	2022
Midfielders
4	Atiqah Wahab	(Singapore)		(Singapore) Simei United FC	2022	2022
6	Nai'mi Nur Batrisyia	(Singapore)		(Singapore)	2022	2022
7	Nurfathin Ardila	(Singapore)		(Singapore) Simei United FC	2022	2022
8	Nadhirah Farid	(Singapore)		(Singapore) Simei United FC	2022	2022
10	Seri Nurhidayah	(Singapore)		(Singapore) Simei United FC	2022	2022
11	Mastura Jeilani	(Singapore)	10 July 1992 (age 34)	(Singapore) Simei United FC	2022	2022
20	Nur Syafiqah	(Singapore)		(Singapore) Simei United FC	2022	2022
24	Nur Azureen	(Singapore)		(Singapore) Police SA	2023	2023
Strikers
15	Tanya Dominique	(France)		(Singapore)	2022	2022

== Coaching staff ==
Position	Name	Ref.
Team Manager	Darwin Jalil	
General Manager	Tim Nee Cheng	
Head Coach	(Singapore) Akbar Nawas	2 years contract till 2023
Head Coach (Women)	(Singapore) Ratna Suffian	
Academy Manager		
Assistant Coach	Nasaruddin Jalil	
Assistant Coach	Nasruldin Baharuddin	
U21 Coach	(Singapore) Haris Sumri	
Goalkeeping Coach	Yazid Yasin	
Fitness Coach	Rosman Sulaiman	
Fitness Coach	(England) Rory Winters	
Analyst	Razif Ariff	
Physiotherapist	Mohamed Nasser	
Kitman		

== Transfer ==
=== In ===
Pre-Season

Position	Player	Transferred From	Ref
GK	(Singapore) Martyn Mun	(Singapore) Young Lions FC	Loan Return
GK	(Singapore) (Japan) Kimura Riki	(Singapore) Lion City Sailors	1 year contract till 2022
GK	(Singapore) Hairul Syirhan	(Singapore) Geylang International	1 year contract till 2022
DF	(Singapore) Darren Teh	(Singapore) Geylang International	2 years contract till 2023
DF	(Singapore) Ho Wai Loon	(Singapore) Lion City Sailors	2 years contract till 2023
DF	(Singapore) Delwinder Singh	(Singapore) Tanjong Pagar United	1 year contract till 2022
DF	(Singapore) Akmal bin Azman	Free Agent	
MF	(Singapore) Naufal Azman	(Singapore) Hougang United	1 year contract till 2022
MF	(Singapore) Ammirul Emmran	(Singapore) Tanjong Pagar United	1 year contract till 2022
MF	(Singapore) Ignatius Ang	Free Agent	1 year contract till 2022
MF	(Singapore) Asshukrie Wahid	(Singapore) Geylang International	1 year contract till 2022
MF	(Japan) Ryoya Tanigushi	(Japan) Albirex Niigata (S)	Free
FW	(Japan) Kuraba Kondo	(Japan) Albirex Niigata (S)	1 year contract till 2022
FW	(Singapore) (England) Max McCoy	(Singapore) Tampines Rovers U21	Free
FW	(Singapore) (England) Hari McCoy	(Italy) ASD San Luca (I4)	Free

Mid-Season

Position	Player	Transferred From	Ref
DF	(Singapore) Madhu Mohana	(Singapore) Tampines Rovers	Free
DF	(Singapore) Khalili Khalif	(Singapore)	Loan Return
FW	(Singapore) Syukri Noorhaizam	(Singapore)	Loan Return

=== Loan In ===
Pre-Season

Position	Player	Transferred From	Ref
GK	(Singapore) Rudy Khairullah	(Singapore) Lion City Sailors	Season loan

=== Out ===
Pre-Season

Position	Player	Transferred To	Ref
GK	(Singapore) Zacharial Leong	Singapore Cricket Club (SFL)	Free
DF	(Singapore) Ahmad Syahir	(Singapore) Geylang International	Free
DF	(Singapore) Fadli Kamis	(Singapore) Geylang International	Free
MF	(Singapore) Max Goh Yi Qi	(Singapore) Project Vaults FC (SFL)	Free
MF	(Singapore) Faizal Raffi	(Singapore) Tanjong Pagar United	Free
MF	(Singapore) Gautam Selvamany	(Singapore) Tiong Bahru FC (SFL)	Free
MF	(Croatia) Kristijan Krajček	(Singapore) Hougang United	Free
FW	(Croatia) Šime Žužul	(Singapore) Geylang International	Free
FW	(Singapore) Hazzuwan Halim	(Singapore) Geylang International	Free
FW	(Singapore) Iqbal Hussain	(Singapore) Geylang International	Free
FW	(Singapore) Joshua De Souza	(Singapore)	Free

Mid-Season

Position	Player	Transferred To	Ref
FW	(Singapore) (France) Yann Weishaupt	(Belgium) Royale Union sportive Givry (B3)	Free
FW	(Singapore) (England) Hari McCoy	(England) Weymouth F.C. (E6)	Free
FW	(Singapore) (England) Max McCoy	(England) Weymouth F.C. (E6)	Free

=== Loan Return ===
Pre-Season

Position	Player	Transferred To	Ref
GK	(Singapore) (Japan) Kimura Riki	(Singapore) Lion City Sailors	Loan Return
DF	(Singapore) Ho Wai Loon	(Singapore) Lion City Sailors	Loan Return

Note: Both Kimura Riki and Ho Wai Loon returned to the club permanently after their contract ended.

=== Loan Out ===
Pre-Season

Position	Player	Transferred To	Ref
DF	(Singapore) Shaqi Sulaiman	(Singapore)	NS till 2022
FW	(Singapore) Syukri Noorhaizam	(Singapore)	NS till 2022
MF	(Singapore) (Nigeria) Jordan Emaviwe	(Singapore) SAFSA	NS till 2023
DF	(Singapore) (Mali) Sameer Alassane	(Singapore) Police SA	NS till 2023

Mid-Season

Position	Player	Transferred To	Ref
GK	(Singapore) Martyn Mun	(Singapore)	NS till 2024

=== Extension / Retained ===
Position	Player	Ref
GK	(Singapore) Martyn Mun	1 year contract signed in 2021
DF	(Serbia) Ensar Brunčević	2 years contract signed in 2020
DF	(Singapore) Aiman Zavyan	1 year contract signed in 2021
DF	(Singapore) Aqil Yazid	1 year contract signed in 2021
DF	(Singapore) Keshav Kumar	1 year contract signed in 2021
DF	(Singapore) Aidil Johari	1 year contract signed in 2021
DF	(Singapore) Amer Hakeem	2 years contract signed in 2020
MF	(Singapore) Aarish Kumar	1 year contract signed in 2021
MF	(Singapore) Gareth Low	1 year contract signed in 2021
MF	(Singapore) Hariysh Krishnakumar	1 year contract signed in 2021
FW	(Japan) Shuhei Hoshino	1 year contract signed in 2021
FW	(Singapore) Puvan Raj Sivalingam	1 year contract signed in 2021 (Promoted)

== Friendly ==
=== Pre-Season Friendly ===
Win Draw Loss

5 February 2022	Albirex Niigata (S) (Japan)	7–0 (Note: The game was played as three periods of 45 minutes)	Balestier Khalsa (Singapore)	Jurong East, Singapore
17:30 SST	K. Kobayashi 7'; Lee 24'; Sugita 29', 51'; Matsuura 75'; Omori 88'; Ochiai 117'	Report		Stadium: Jurong East Stadium

10 February 2022	Tanjong Pagar United (Singapore)	8–1	(Singapore) Balestier Khalsa	Jurong East
				Stadium: Jurong East Stadium

=== Mid-Season Friendly ===
10 June 2022 Friendly	Terengganu F.C. I (Malaysia)	4–0	(Singapore) Balestier Khalsa	Terengganu
	Habib Haroon 9'; Nik Sharif Haseefy 28'; Ridzuan Razali; Engku Nur Shakir			Stadium: Sultan Mizan Zainal Abidin Stadium

== Team statistics ==
=== Appearances and goals ===
As of 18 Nov 2022

Numbers in parentheses denote appearances as substitute.

No.	Pos.	Player	SPL		Singapore Cup		Total	
No.	Pos.	Player	Apps.	Goals	Apps.	Goals	Apps.	Goals
1	GK	(Singapore) Hairul Syirhan	16	0	6	0	22	0
3	DF	(Singapore) Keshav Kumar	0+4	0	0	0	4	0
4	DF	(Singapore) Delwinder Singh	14+8	1	6	0	28	1
5	DF	(Serbia) Ensar Brunčević	20+1	2	6	0	27	2
6	MF	(Singapore) Aarish Kumar	3+5	0	0	0	8	0
7	FW	(Singapore) Daniel Goh	8+8	5	6	3	22	8
8	MF	(Singapore) Ammirul Emmran	15+7	0	3+2	0	27	0
9	FW	(Japan) Shuhei Hoshino	26	18	6	2	32	20
10	MF	(Japan) Ryoya Tanigushi	28	10	4+1	2	33	12
11	MF	(Japan) Kuraba Kondo	27	7	6	4	33	11
13	DF	(Singapore) Amer Hakeem	7+1	0	0+4	0	12	0
15	DF	(Singapore) Khalili Khalif	1	0	0	0	1	0
16	DF	(Singapore) Darren Teh	25+1	0	6	0	32	0
17	MF	(Singapore) Naufal Azman	2+11	0	0+4	0	17	0
18	GK	(Singapore) (Japan) Kimura Riki	0	0	0	0	0	0
19	MF	(Singapore) Asshukrie Wahid	2+7	0	0+1	0	10	0
20	GK	(Singapore) Rudy Khairullah	12	0	0	0	12	0
22	FW	(Singapore) Puvan Raj	1+1	0	0+1	0	3	0
23	FW	(Singapore) Syukri Noorhaizam	0+1	0	0	0	1	0
24	DF	(Singapore) Ho Wai Loon	24	0	6	0	30	0
27	DF	(Singapore) Akmal bin Azman	7+6	0	0	0	13	0
28	MF	(Singapore) Gareth Low	20	1	3+2	0	25	1
29	DF	(Singapore) Aidil Johari	14+7	0	0+1	0	22	0
30	MF	(Singapore) Ignatius Ang	13+7	1	3	0	23	1
33	DF	(Singapore) Madhu Mohana	17	0	6	0	23	0
39	DF	(Singapore) Aiman Zavyan	1	0	0	0	1	0
66	MF	(Singapore) Ryan Praveen	0+4	0	0	0	4	0
67	MF	(Singapore) Iftiqar Parizan	1	0	0	0	1	0
74	MF	(France) Yann Weishaupt	1	0	0	0	1	0
77	MF	(Singapore) (England) Hari McCoy	1	0	0	0	1	0
80	DF	(Singapore) Aqil Yazid	2	0	0	0	2	0
Players who have played this season but had left the club or on loan to other club

== Competitions (SPL) ==
=== Overview ===
Competition	Record							
Competition	P	W	D	L	GF	GA	GD	Win %

=== Singapore Premier League ===
Win Draw Loss

26 February 2022 1	Balestier Khalsa (Singapore)	2–2	(Singapore) Tampines Rovers	Toa Payoh
	Shuhei Hoshino 46'; Ensar Brunčević 57'	Report	Boris Kopitović 37'; Taufik Suparno 45+1'; Shuya Yamashita (yellow card) 28'; Syed Firdaus Hassan (yellow card) 82'	Stadium: Toa Payoh Stadium; Referee: Muhammad Taqi

5 March 2022 2	Albirex Niigata (S) (Japan)	6–0	(Singapore) Balestier Khalsa	Jurong East
	Kodai Tanaka 33' 54' 60' 68'; Tadanari Lee 57'; Jun Kobayashi 67'; Masahiro Sugita (yellow card) 61'	Report		Stadium: Jurong East Stadium; Referee: Hilmi Fuad

12 March 2022 3	Balestier Khalsa (Singapore)	3–5	(Singapore) Tanjong Pagar United	Toa Payoh
	Kuraba Kondo 23'; Ryoya Tanigushi 27'; Shuhei Hoshino 32'	Report	Khairul Amri 10'; Blake Ricciuto 18'; Mario Sugic 50' 59' (yellow card) 14'; Reo Nishiguchi 82'; Faritz Hameed (yellow card) 19'	Stadium: Toa Payoh Stadium; Referee: Clarence Leow Hong Wei

19 March 2022 4	Balestier Khalsa (Singapore)	4–3	(Singapore) Young Lions FC	Toa Payoh
	Ryoya Tanigushi 41'; Kuraba Kondo 44' 62'; Shuhei Hoshino 85'	Report	Zikos Vasileios Chua 16'; Zulqarnaen Suzliman 53'; Ilhan Fandi 89'	Stadium: Toa Payoh Stadium; Referee: Taufik Thana

1 April 2022 5	Lion City Sailors (Singapore)	4–0	(Singapore) Balestier Khalsa	Jalan Besar
	Kim Shin-wook 6' 30' 55'; Song Ui-young 27' (yellow card) 22'	Report	Ryoya Taniguchi (yellow card) 87'	Stadium: Jalan Besar Stadium; Referee: Ahmad A'qashah

5 April 2022 6	Balestier Khalsa (Singapore)	2–1	(Singapore) Hougang United	Toa Payoh
	Shuhei Hoshino 24'; Ensar Brunčević 52'; Aidil Johari (yellow card) 75'; Ammirul Emmran (yellow card) 88'; Rudy Khairullah (yellow card) 89'	Report	Sahil Suhaimi 81'; André Moritz (yellow card) 44'	Stadium: Toa Payoh Stadium; Referee: Abirami Naidu

10 April 2022 7	Geylang International (Singapore)	0–1	(Singapore) Balestier Khalsa	Tampines
	Ahmad Syahir (yellow card) 30'; Zaiful Nizam (yellow card) 55'; Kieran Teo (yellow card) 85'	Report	Shuhei Hoshino 61'; Ensar Brunčević (yellow card) 27'; Rudy Khairullah (yellow card) 58'	Stadium: Our Tampines Hub; Referee: Taufik Thana

8 May 2022 8	Tampines Rovers (Singapore)	2–1	(Singapore) Balestier Khalsa	Tampines
	Zehrudin Mehmedović 32' (yellow card) 90+5'; Boris Kopitović 59'; Amirul Hakia (yellow card) 61'	Report	Gareth Low 15' (yellow card) 48'; Delwinder Singh (yellow card) 90+5' (yellow-red card) 90+6'	Stadium: Our Tampines Hub; Referee: Clarence Leow Hong Wei

13 May 2022 9	Balestier Khalsa (Singapore)	1–2	(Singapore) Albirex Niigata (S)	Toa Payoh
	Shuhei Hoshino 49'; Ho Wai Loon (yellow card) 9'; Gareth Low (yellow card) 10'; Puvan Raj Sivalingam (yellow card) 22'	Report	Jun Kobayashi 10'; Tadanari Lee 86'; Reo Kunimoto (yellow card) 32'	Stadium: Toa Payoh Stadium; Referee: Ahmad A'qashah

20 May 2022 10	Tanjong Pagar United (Singapore)	1–0	(Singapore) Balestier Khalsa	Jurong East
	Reo Nishiguchi 37'; Fathullah Rahmat (yellow card) 20'; Faizal Raffi (red card) 90'	Report	Shuhei Hoshino (yellow card) 18'; Ammirul Emmran (yellow card) 62'	Stadium: Jurong East Stadium; Referee: Hilmi Fuad

28 May 2022 11	Hougang United (Singapore)	3–1	(Singapore) Balestier Khalsa	Hougang
	Kaishu Yamazaki 22'; Hafiz Sujad 59' (yellow card) 67'; Kristijan Krajcek 85'; Anders Aplin (yellow card) 86'	Report	Shuhei Hoshino 30'; Delwinder Singh (yellow card) 50'; Aidil Johari (yellow card) 83'	Stadium: Hougang Stadium; Referee: Jansen Foo

19 June 2022 12	Balestier Khalsa (Singapore)	1–6	(Singapore) Lion City Sailors	Toa Payoh
	Daniel Goh 90+3' (pen.)	Report	Shahdan Sulaiman 10' 41'; Song Ui-young 19'; Hariss Harun 26'; Gabriel Quak 74'; Faris Ramli 81'	Stadium: Toa Payoh Stadium; Referee: Taufik Thana

25 June 2022 13	Young Lions FC (Singapore)	0–1	(Singapore) Balestier Khalsa	Jalan Besar
	Danish Qayyum (red card) 36'; Syed Akmal (yellow card) 73'	Report	Ryoya Tanigushi 69'; Ensar Brunčević (yellow card) 29'; Shuhei Hoshino (yellow card) 36'; Darren Teh (yellow card) 60'; Akmal Azman (yellow card) 70'; Hairul Syirhan (yellow card) 90'	Stadium: Jalan Besar Stadium; Referee: Ahmad A'qashah

2 July 2022 14	Balestier Khalsa (Singapore)	0–2	(Singapore) Geylang International	Toa Payoh
	Ensar Brunčević (yellow card) 61'	Report	Šime Žužul 49' (pen.); Hazzuwan Halim 78'; Faizal Roslan (yellow card) 77'	Stadium: Toa Payoh Stadium; Referee: Clarence Leow Hong Wei

9 July 2022 15	Balestier Khalsa (Singapore)	2–2	(Singapore) Tampines Rovers	Toa Payoh
	Ignatius Ang 7'; Shuhei Hoshino 39'; Ho Wai Loon (yellow card) 24'; Ensar Bruncevic (yellow card) 86'; Delwinder Singh (yellow card) 90'; Ryoya Taniguchi (yellow card) 90+4'	Report	Boris Kopitović 52'; Taufik Suparno 63'; Shuya Yamashita (yellow card) 64'	Stadium: Toa Payoh Stadium; Referee: Hilmi Fuad

16 July 2022 16	Albirex Niigata (S) (Japan)	4–1	(Singapore) Balestier Khalsa	Jurong East
	Ilhan Fandi 11' 22' 62'; Kodai Tanaka 13'	Report	Shuhei Hoshino 41'	Stadium: Jurong East Stadium; Referee: Shadiq Al-Hussain

23 July 2022 17	Balestier Khalsa (Singapore)	0–2	(Singapore) Tanjong Pagar United	Toa Payoh
	Daniel Goh (yellow card) 4'; Ryoya Tanigushi (yellow card) 54'; Ensar Brunčević (yellow card) 90'	Report	Reo Nishiguchi 28' 78'; Rusyaidi Salime (yellow card) 32'; Raihan Rahman (yellow card) 54'; Fathullah Rahmat (yellow card) 62'	Stadium: Toa Payoh Stadium; Referee: Muhammad Taqi

31 July 2022 18	Balestier Khalsa (Singapore)	2–0	(Singapore) Young Lions FC	Toa Payoh
	Shuhei Hoshino 45' (yellow card) 23'; Kuraba Kondo 75' (pen.); Hairul Syirhan (yellow card) 39'; Ho Wai Loon (yellow card) 73'; Akmal Bin Azman (yellow card) 90'	Report	Harith Kanadi (yellow card) 65'	Stadium: Toa Payoh Stadium; Referee: Ahmad A'qashah

6 August 2022 19	Lion City Sailors (Singapore)	4–0	(Singapore) Balestier Khalsa	Jalan Besar
	Kim Shin-wook 5' (pen.); Maxime Lestienne 70'; Saifullah Akbar 72' (yellow card) 89'; Song Ui-young 77'; Amirul Adli (yellow card) 55'; Diego Lopes (yellow card) 62'	Report	Kuraba Kondo (penalty missed) 89	Stadium: Jalan Besar Stadium; Referee: Ahmad A'qashah

12 August 2022 20	Balestier Khalsa (Singapore)	6–1	(Singapore) Hougang United	Toa Payoh
	Shuhei Hoshino 5' 67' 85' (yellow card) 78'; Delwinder Singh 21'; Ryoya Tanigushi 33'; Kuraba Kondo 73'	Report	Shahfiq Ghani 16' (yellow card) 61'; Pedro Bortoluzo (yellow card) 50'; Nazrul Nazari (yellow card) 76'; Shahril Ishak (yellow card) 81'; Afiq Noor (yellow card) 86'	Stadium: Toa Payoh Stadium; Referee: Andrea Verolino

21 August 2022 21	Geylang International (Singapore)	3–0	(Singapore) Balestier Khalsa	Tampines
	Šime Žužul 37' (pen.) 80'; Ariffin Noor 90+3'; Rio Sakuma (yellow card) 76'; Takahiro Tezuka (yellow card) 88'	Report	Ensar Brunčević (yellow card) 61'; Delwinder Singh (yellow card) 61'; Asshukrie Wahid (yellow card) 68'	Stadium: Our Tampines Hub; Referee: Shadiq Al-Hussain

28 August 2022 22	Tampines Rovers (Singapore)	2–1	(Singapore) Balestier Khalsa	Tampines
	Boris Kopitović 37' 90' (pen.); Syed Firdaus (yellow card) 41'; Irwan Shah (yellow card) 84'	Report	Shuhei Hoshino 48'; Madhu Mohana (yellow card) 21'; Ensar Brunčević (yellow card) 26'; Akmal bin Azman (yellow card) 49'	Stadium: Our Tampines Hub; Referee: Farhad Mohamed

2 September 2022 23	Balestier Khalsa (Singapore)	3–5	(Japan) Albirex Niigata (S)	Toa Payoh
	Shuhei Hoshino 31' 54'; Kuraba Kondo 56'; Ryoya Taniguchi (penalty missed) 89; Gareth Low (yellow card) 50'; Ammirul Emmran (yellow card) 61'; Ho Wai Loon (yellow card) 76'	Report	Kodai Tanaka 50' 62' 75' 85' (pen.); Masaya Idetsu 81'; Daichi Omori (yellow card) 88'; Reo Kunimoto (yellow card) 89'	Stadium: Toa Payoh Stadium; Referee: Hilmi Fuad

9 September 2022 24	Tanjong Pagar United (Singapore)	3–1	(Singapore) Balestier Khalsa	Jurong East
	Mirko Šugić 28'; Blake Ricciuto 61'; Khairul Amri 71'	Report	Ryoya Tanigushi 82'; Madhu Mohana (yellow card) 57'; Ammirul Emmran (yellow card) 60'; Gareth Low (yellow card) 90+2'	Stadium: Jurong East Stadium; Referee: Andrea Verolino

20 October 2022 25 (Rescheduled)	Hougang United (Singapore)	4–1	(Singapore) Balestier Khalsa	Hougang
	Pedro Bortoluzo 7' 90+6'; Kristijan Krajcek 21'; André Moritz 37'	Report	Daniel Goh 86'; Darren Teh (yellow card) 66'	Stadium: Hougang Stadium; Referee: Shadiq Al-Hussain

2 October 2022 26	Balestier Khalsa (Singapore)	5–3	(Singapore) Lion City Sailors	Toa Payoh
	Ryoya Tanigushi 44' 48' 75'; Daniel Goh 50' (yellow card) 70'; Shuhei Hoshino 58' (penalty missed) 68	Report	Song Ui-young 30' 31'; Hariss Harun 62' (red card) 88'; Adam Swandi (yellow card) 61'; Maxime Lestienne (yellow card) 90+1'	Stadium: Toa Payoh Stadium; Referee: Shadiq Al-Hussain

8 October 2022 27	Young Lions FC (Singapore)	4–4	(Singapore) Balestier Khalsa	Jalan Besar
	Khairin Nadim 23'; Shah Shahiran 58' (pen.); Elijah Lim Teck Yong 73'; Jordan Emaviwe 90+5' (pen.); Harith Kanadi (yellow card) 50'; Harhys Stewart (yellow card) 90'	Report	Daniel Goh 4'; Shuhei Hoshino 6'; Ryoya Tanigushi 15'; Kuraba Kondo 41'; Ho Wai Loon (yellow card) 66'	Stadium: Jalan Besar Stadium; Referee: Abirami Naidu

14 October 2022 28 (Rescheduled)	Balestier Khalsa (Singapore)	2–4	(Singapore) Geylang International	Toa Payoh
	Ryoya Tanigushi 40'; Daniel Goh 90+4'; Kuraba Kondo (yellow card) 32'; Ignatius Ang (yellow card) 71'	Report	Šime Žužul 21'; Ilhan Noor 44'; Tajeli Salamat 47' 90'; Hazzuwan Halim (yellow card) 80'; Zulfairuuz Rudy (yellow card) 83'	Stadium: Toa Payoh Stadium; Referee: Farhad Mohamed

Pos	Team	Pld	W	D	L	GF	GA	GD	Pts	Qualification or relegation
4	Geylang International	28	10	9	9	48	46	+2	39	
5	Hougang United	28	10	9	9	65	71	−6	39	Qualification for AFC Cup group stage (Cup Winner)
6	Tanjong Pagar United	28	10	7	11	59	69	−10	37	
7	Balestier Khalsa	28	7	3	18	45	78	−33	24	
8	Young Lions (Note: The foreign club – Albirex Niigata (S) – as well as the Football Association of Singapore (FAS) under-21 team, Young Lions, are ineligible for any AFC competition spots.)	28	2	2	24	34	103	−69	8	

Source: Singapore Premier League
Rules for classification: 1) points; 2) goal difference; 3) number of goals scored; 4) number of wins

=== Singapore Cup ===
Pos	Team	Pld	W	D	L	GF	GA	GD	Pts	Qualification
1	Albirex Niigata (S) (Q)	3	3	0	0	7	1	+6	9	Semi-finals
2	Balestier Khalsa (Q)	3	1	1	1	8	6	+2	4	Semi-finals
3	Lion City Sailors	3	0	2	1	5	6	−1	2	
4	Young Lions FC	3	0	1	2	3	10	−7	1	

Updated to match(es) played on 25 September 2019. Source: FAS
(Q) Qualified for the phase indicated

Win Draw Loss

==== Group ====
27 October 2022 Match 1	Lion City Sailors (Singapore)	3–3	(Singapore) Balestier Khalsa	Jalan Besar
	Faris Ramli 14'; Maxime Lestienne 47' 57'; Adam Swandi (yellow card) 22'	Report	Kuraba Kondo 22' 55'; Shuhei Hoshino 66'; Darren Teh (yellow card) 59'	Stadium: Jalan Besar Stadium; Referee: Ahmad A'qashah

31 October 2022 Match 2	Albirex Niigata (S) (Japan)	1–0	(Singapore) Balestier Khalsa	Jurong East
	Kodai Tanaka 74' (pen.); Masahiro Sugita (penalty missed) 81; Masaya Idetsu (yellow card) 55'; Jun Kobayashi (yellow card) 87' (yellow-red card) 90+4'	Report		Stadium: Jurong East Stadium; Referee: Hilmi Fuad

5 November 2022 Match 3	Balestier Khalsa (Singapore)	5–2	(Singapore) Young Lions FC	Toa Payoh
	Daniel Goh 9'; Kuraba Kondo 11' 30'; Shuhei Hoshino 21'; Ryoya Tanigushi 38' (yellow card) 88'	Report	Rasaq Akeem 41'; Jordan Emaviwe 48'; Jared Gallagher (yellow card) 45'	Stadium: Toa Payoh Stadium; Referee: Andrea Verolino

==== Semi-final ====
11 November 2022	Tampines Rovers (Singapore)	8–1	(Singapore) Balestier Khalsa	Tampines
	Taufik Suparno 26'; Yasir Hanapi 27'; Boris Kopitović 31' 71' 73' (yellow card) 72'; Joel Chew 52'; Zehrudin Mehmedović 78' 90+1'; Irwan Shah (yellow card) 80'	Report	Daniel Goh 81'; Hairul Syirhan (yellow card) 37'; Ensar Brunčević (yellow card) 85'	Stadium: Our Tampines Hub; Referee: Shadiq Al-Hussain

15 November 2022	Balestier Khalsa (Singapore)	0–1	(Singapore) Tampines Rovers	Toa Payoh
	Ryoya Taniguchi (penalty missed) 61; Ho Wai Loon (yellow card) 50'; Kuraba Kondo (yellow card) 57'; Madhu Mohana (yellow card) 90'	Report	Hairul Syirhan 12' (o.g.); Syed Firdaus (yellow card) 30'; Taufik Suparno (yellow card) 42'; Christopher van Huizen (yellow card) 73'; Shameer Aziq (yellow card) 90+3'	Stadium: Toa Payoh Stadium; Referee: Hilmi Fuad

Balestier Khalsa lost 9–1 on aggregate.

==== 3rd/4th placing ====
18 November 2022	Albriex Niigata (S) (Japan)	3–2	(Singapore) Balestier Khalsa	Jalan Besar
	Ilhan Fandi 32' 39'; Reo Kunimoto 61'; Mahiro Takahashi (yellow card) 61'; Jun Kobayashi (yellow card) 64'; Takahiro Koga (yellow card) 90+2'	Report	Daniel Goh 63'; Ryoya Tanigushi 72'; Delwinder Singh (yellow card) 89'	Stadium: Jalan Besar Stadium; Referee: Abirami Naidu
