= List of Singaporean football transfer 2022 =

This is a list of Singapore soccer transfers for the 2022 Singapore Premier League.

== Transfers ==
All players without a flag are Singaporean. All clubs without a flag are Singapore based club.

=== Albirex Niigata (S) ===
In: Note: Flags indicate national team as defined under FIFA eligibility rules; some limited exceptions apply. Players may hold more than one non-FIFA nationality.

| No. | Pos. | Nation | Player |
|---|---|---|---|
| — | DF | JPN | Reo Kunimoto (loan from (Japan) Renofa Yamaguchi FC) |
| — | MF | SGP | Nicky Melvin Singh (loan from (Singapore) Tampines Rovers) |
| — | DF | JPN | Jun Kobayashi (from (Japan) Kwansei Gakuin University) |
| — | DF | JPN | Daichi Omori (from (Japan) Toyo University) |
| — | DF | JPN | Tatsuya Sambongi (from (Japan) Kanagawa University) |
| — | DF | JPN | Shogo Toyomura (from (Japan) Chuo Gakuin University) |
| — | DF | JPN | Keito Hariya (from (Japan) Funabashi Municipal High School) |
| — | DF | JPN | Yoshiki Matsuura (from Japan Soccer College) |
| — | MF | JPN | Kanato Fukazawa (from Japan Soccer College) |
| — | MF | JPN | Kumpei Kakuta (from (Japan) Kanagawa University) |
| — | MF | JPN | Masahiro Sugita (from (Japan) Waseda University) |
| — | MF | JPN | Kan Kobayashi (from (Japan) Tsukuba University) |
| — | MF | JPN | Masaya Idetsu (from (Japan) Osaka Sangyo University) |
| — | FW | JPN | Tadanari Lee (from (Japan) Kyoto Sanga) |
| — | FW | JPN | Kodai Tanaka (from (Japan) Takushoku University) |
| — | FW | JPN | Shota Ochiai (from Japan Soccer College) |

Out: Note: Flags indicate national team as defined under FIFA eligibility rules; some limited exceptions apply. Players may hold more than one non-FIFA nationality.

| No. | Pos. | Nation | Player |
|---|---|---|---|
| — | GK | | Sunny Tia (to (Singapore) Tampines Rovers) |
| — | MF | | Ong Yu En (to (Singapore) Tampines Rovers) |
| — | DF | JPN | Takahiro Tezuka (to (Singapore) Geylang International) |
| — | DF | JPN | Yu Tokiwa (to (Japan) ) |
| — | DF | JPN | Shuya Yamashita (to (Singapore) Tampines Rovers) |
| — | DF | JPN | Kazuki Hashioka (to (Japan) ) |
| — | DF | JPN | Yasuhiro Hanada (to (Japan) ) |
| — | DF | JPN | Kohga Tsuruhara (to (Croatia) NK Križevci) |
| — | MF | JPN | Ryoya Tanigushi (to (Singapore) Balestier Khalsa) |
| — | MF | JPN | Kosuke Chiku (to (Japan) Gainare Tottori) |
| — | MF | JPN | Makoto Ito (to (Japan) ) |
| — | FW | JPN | Morrison Hashii (to (Japan) ) |
| — | FW | JPN | Kuraba Kondo (to (Singapore) Balestier Khalsa) |
| — | FW | JPN | Ryosuke Nagasawa (to (Serbia) FK Radnički Niš) |
| — | FW | JPN | Fumiya Suzuki (to (Japan) ) |
| — | FW | JPN | Kiyoshiro Tsuboi (loan return to (Japan) Tokushima Vortis) |

Retained: Note: Flags indicate national team as defined under FIFA eligibility rules; some limited exceptions apply. Players may hold more than one non-FIFA nationality.

| No. | Pos. | Nation | Player |
|---|---|---|---|
| — | GK | SGP | Hyrulnizam Juma'at |
| — | GK | JPN | Takahiro Koga |
| — | MF | SGP | Hilman Norhisam |
| — | MF | JPN | Mahiro Takahashi |
| — | MF | JPN | Tsubasa Kawanishi |
| — | FW | SGP | Fairoz Hassan |
| — | FW | SGP | Fikri Junaidi |

=== Balestier Khalsa ===
In: Note: Flags indicate national team as defined under FIFA eligibility rules; some limited exceptions apply. Players may hold more than one non-FIFA nationality.

| No. | Pos. | Nation | Player |
|---|---|---|---|
| — | MF | JPN | Ryoya Tanigushi (from (Japan) Albirex Niigata (S)) |
| — | FW | JPN | Kuraba Kondo (from (Japan) Albirex Niigata (S)) |
| — | GK | | Martyn Mun (loan return from Young Lions FC) |
| — | GK | | Kimura Riki (from Lion City Sailors) |
| — | GK | | Rudy Khairullah (loan from Lion City Sailors) |
| — | GK | | Hairul Syirhan (from Geylang International) |
| — | DF | | Darren Teh (from Geylang International) |
| — | DF | | Ho Wai Loon (from Lion City Sailors) |
| — | DF | | Delwinder Singh (from Tanjong Pagar United) |
| — | MF | | Naufal Azman (from Hougang United) |
| — | MF | | Asshukrie Wahid (from Geylang International) |
| — | MF | | Ammirul Emmran (from Tanjong Pagar United) |

Out: Note: Flags indicate national team as defined under FIFA eligibility rules; some limited exceptions apply. Players may hold more than one non-FIFA nationality.

| No. | Pos. | Nation | Player |
|---|---|---|---|
| — | MF | CRO | Kristijan Krajček (to Hougang United) |
| — | FW | CRO | Šime Žužul (to Geylang International) |
| — | GK | | Zacharial Leong (to) |
| — | GK | | Kimura Riki (loan return to Lion City Sailors) |
| — | DF | | Ho Wai Loon (loan return to Lion City Sailors) |
| — | DF | | Ahmad Syahir (to Geylang International) |
| — | DF | | Fadli Kamis (to Geylang International) |
| — | DF | | Khalili Khalif (to) |
| — | MF | | Max Goh Yi Qi (to) |
| — | MF | | Faizal Raffi (to Tanjong Pagar United) |
| — | MF | | Gautam Selvamany (to) |
| — | FW | | Hazzuwan Halim (to Geylang International) |
| — | FW | | Iqbal Hussain (to) |

Retained: Note: Flags indicate national team as defined under FIFA eligibility rules; some limited exceptions apply. Players may hold more than one non-FIFA nationality.

| No. | Pos. | Nation | Player |
|---|---|---|---|
| — | DF | SRB | Ensar Brunčević |
| — | FW | JPN | Shuhei Hoshino |
| — | GK | SGP | Martyn Mun |
| — | DF | SGP | Aiman Zavyan |
| — | DF | SGP | Aqil Yazid |
| — | DF | SGP | Keshav Kumar |
| — | DF | SGP | Aidil Johari |
| — | DF | SGP | Amer Hakeem |
| — | MF | SGP | Aarish Kumar |
| — | MF | SGP | Gareth Low |
| — | MF | SGP | Hariysh Krishnakumar |

Note 1: Kimura Riki was transferred permanently to Balestier Khalsa after a successful 2021 season

=== Geylang International ===
In: Note: Flags indicate national team as defined under FIFA eligibility rules; some limited exceptions apply. Players may hold more than one non-FIFA nationality.

| No. | Pos. | Nation | Player |
|---|---|---|---|
| — | DF | JPN | Takahiro Tezuka (from (Japan) Albirex Niigata (S)) |
| — | DF | JPN | Rio Sakuma (from (Cambodia) Tiffy Army FC) |
| — | MF | FRA | Vincent Bezecourt (from (Armenia) FC Alashkert) |
| — | FW | CRO | Šime Žužul (from Balestier Khalsa) |
| — | DF | | Ahmad Syahir (from Balestier Khalsa) |
| — | DF | | Fadli Kamis (from Balestier Khalsa) |
| — | DF | | Danish Irfan (loan return from Young Lions FC) |
| — | DF | | Faizal Roslan (from Lion City Sailors) |
| — | MF | | Huzaifah Aziz (from Tampines Rovers) |
| — | FW | | Hazzuwan Halim (from Balestier Khalsa) |

Out: Note: Flags indicate national team as defined under FIFA eligibility rules; some limited exceptions apply. Players may hold more than one non-FIFA nationality.

| No. | Pos. | Nation | Player |
|---|---|---|---|
| — | DF | JPN | Yuki Ichikawa (Retired) |
| — | MF | NED | Barry Maguire (to (Netherlands) Den Bosch) |
| — | MF | AUS | Danny Kim (to (Australia) Bentleigh Greens SC) |
| — | FW | BRA | Matheus Moresche (to (Australia) Central Coast Mariners) |
| — | GK | | Hairul Syirhan (to Balestier Khalsa) |
| — | DF | | Darren Teh (to Balestier Khalsa) |
| — | DF | | Afiq Yunos (to) |
| — | DF | | Adam Hakeem (to) |
| — | DF | | Faizal Roslan (loan return to Lion City Sailors) |
| — | DF | | Iqram Rifqi (loan return to Lion City Sailors) |
| — | DF | | Danish Irfan (to Tampines Rovers) |
| — | MF | | Asshukrie Wahid (to Balestier Khalsa) |
| — | MF | | Christopher van Huizen (to Tampines Rovers) |
| — | MF | | Firdaus Kasman (to Tampines Rovers) |
| — | MF | | Izzdin Shafiq (to) |
| — | MF | | Furqan Raoff (to) |
| — | FW | | Amy Recha (to Hougang United) |
| — | FW | | Idris Sadlizan (to) |

Retained: Note: Flags indicate national team as defined under FIFA eligibility rules; some limited exceptions apply. Players may hold more than one non-FIFA nationality.

| No. | Pos. | Nation | Player |
|---|---|---|---|
| — | GK | SGP | Zaiful Nizam |
| — | DF | SGP | Abdil Qaiyyim Mutalib |
| — | DF | SGP | Ilhan Noor |
| — | MF | SGP | Umar Ramle |
| — | MF | SGP | Azri Suhaili |
| — | FW | SGP | Fareez Farhan (to) |

Note 1: Danish Irfan was released after returning from loan before moving to Tampines Rovers.

=== Hougang United ===
In: Note: Flags indicate national team as defined under FIFA eligibility rules; some limited exceptions apply. Players may hold more than one non-FIFA nationality.

| No. | Pos. | Nation | Player |
|---|---|---|---|
| — | DF | BRA | Artur Jesus Vieira (from (Thailand) Khon Kaen F.C.) |
| — | MF | CRO | Kristijan Krajček (from Balestier Khalsa) |
| — | FW | BRA | Pedro Bortoluzo (from (Portugal) U.D. Oliveirense) |
| — | DF | | Nazhiim Harman (from Young Lions FC) |
| — | FW | | Amy Recha (from Geylang International) |

Out: Note: Flags indicate national team as defined under FIFA eligibility rules; some limited exceptions apply. Players may hold more than one non-FIFA nationality.

| No. | Pos. | Nation | Player |
|---|---|---|---|
| — | DF | KGZ | Maksat Dzhakybaliev (to (Kyrgyzstan) ) |
| — | FW | JPN | Tomoyuki Doi (to (Japan) Fujieda MYFC) |
| — | FW | BRA | Gilberto Fortunato (to (Brazil) ) |
| — | GK | | Izwan Mahbud (to Lion City Sailors) |
| — | MF | | Naufal Azman (to Balestier Khalsa) |
| — | FW | | Khairul Nizam (to Tanjong Pagar United) |

Retained: Note: Flags indicate national team as defined under FIFA eligibility rules; some limited exceptions apply. Players may hold more than one non-FIFA nationality.

| No. | Pos. | Nation | Player |
|---|---|---|---|
| — | MF | JPN | Kaishu Yamazaki |
| — | GK | SGP | Ridhuan Barudin |
| — | GK | SGP | Mukundan Maran |
| — | GK | SGP | Aizil Yazid |
| — | DF | SGP | Nazrul Nazari |
| — | DF | SGP | Muhaimin Suhaimi |
| — | DF | SGP | Anders Aplin |
| — | DF | SGP | Lionel Tan |
| — | DF | SGP | Hafiz Sujad |
| — | DF | SGP | Faiz Salleh |
| — | DF | SGP | Kishon Philip |
| — | MF | SGP | Fabian Kwok |
| — | MF | SGP | Farhan Zulkifli |
| — | MF | SGP | Idraki Adnan |
| — | MF | SGP | Afiq Noor |
| — | FW | SGP | Shahfiq Ghani |
| — | FW | SGP | Shawal Anuar |
| — | FW | SGP | Sahil Suhaimi |
| — | FW | SGP | Shahril Ishak |
| — | FW | SGP | Amir Zalani |

=== Lion City Sailors ===
In: Note: Flags indicate national team as defined under FIFA eligibility rules; some limited exceptions apply. Players may hold more than one non-FIFA nationality.

| No. | Pos. | Nation | Player |
|---|---|---|---|
| — | DF | BRA | Pedro Henrique (from (Portugal) Vitória S.C.) |
| — | FW | KOR | Kim Shin-Wook (from (China) Shanghai Shenhua) |
| — | FW | BEL | Maxime Lestienne (from (Belgium) Standard Liege) |
| — | GK | | Izwan Mahbud (from Hougang United) |
| — | GK | | Putra Anugerah (loan return from Young Lions FC) |
| — | GK | | Kimura Riki (loan return from Balestier Khalsa) |
| — | DF | | Ho Wai Loon (loan return from Balestier Khalsa) |
| — | DF | | Faizal Roslan (loan return from Geylang International) |
| — | DF | | Iqram Rifqi (loan return from Geylang International) |
| — | DF | | Zulqarnaen Suzliman (loan return from Young Lions FC) |
| — | MF | | Hami Syahin (loan return from Young Lions FC) |
| — | MF | | Bill Mamadou (loan return from Young Lions FC) |
| — | MF | | Anumanthan Kumar (from (Malaysia) Kedah Darul Aman) |
| — | FW | | Anaqi Ismit (loan return from Tanjong Pagar United) |

Out: Note: Flags indicate national team as defined under FIFA eligibility rules; some limited exceptions apply. Players may hold more than one non-FIFA nationality.

| No. | Pos. | Nation | Player |
|---|---|---|---|
| — | DF | BRA | Jorge Fellipe (to (Portugal) Académica de Coimbra) |
| — | FW | CRO | Stipe Plazibat (to (Romania) Academica Clinceni) |
| — | GK | | Rudy Khairullah (loan to Balestier Khalsa) |
| — | GK | | Kimura Riki (to Balestier Khalsa) |
| — | DF | | Aqhari Abdullah (to Tanjong Pagar United) |
| — | DF | | Ho Wai Loon (to Balestier Khalsa) |
| — | DF | | Faizal Roslan (to Geylang International) |

Retained: Note: Flags indicate national team as defined under FIFA eligibility rules; some limited exceptions apply. Players may hold more than one non-FIFA nationality.

| No. | Pos. | Nation | Player |
|---|---|---|---|
| — | MF | BRA | Diego Lopes |
| — | GK | SGP | Hassan Sunny |
| — | GK | SGP | Adib Hakim |
| — | DF | SGP | Tajeli Salamat |
| — | DF | SGP | Amirul Adli |
| — | DF | SGP | Nur Adam Abdullah |
| — | MF | SGP | Shahdan Sulaiman |
| — | MF | SGP | Hafiz Nor |
| — | MF | SGP | Hariss Harun |
| — | MF | SGP | Saifullah Akbar |
| — | MF | SGP | Gabriel Quak |
| — | MF | SGP | Aizal Murhamdani |
| — | MF | SGP | Adam Swandi |
| — | FW | SGP | Amiruldin Asraf |
| — | FW | SGP | Haiqal Pashia |
| — | FW | SGP | Faris Ramli |

Note 1: Kimura Riki was transferred to Balestier Khalsa after a successful 2021 season

Note 2: Ho Wai Loon & Faizal Roslan were released after their loan with Balestier and Geylang. Ho Wai Loon returned to Balestier on free transfer. Faizal Roslan returned to Geylang on free transfer.

Note 3: Rudy Khairullah signed a new contract before being loaned to Balestier Khalsa for the 2022 season.

=== Tampines Rovers ===
In: Note: Flags indicate national team as defined under FIFA eligibility rules; some limited exceptions apply. Players may hold more than one non-FIFA nationality.

| No. | Pos. | Nation | Player |
|---|---|---|---|
| — | DF | JPN | Shuya Yamashita (from (Japan) Albirex Niigata (S)) |
| — | GK | | Sunny Tia (from (Japan) Albirex Niigata (S)) |
| — | DF | | Danish Irfan (from Geylang International) |
| — | MF | | Christopher van Huizen (from Geylang International) |
| — | MF | | Firdaus Kasman (from Geylang International) |
| — | MF | | Ong Yu En (from (Japan) Albirex Niigata (S)) |

Out: Note: Flags indicate national team as defined under FIFA eligibility rules; some limited exceptions apply. Players may hold more than one non-FIFA nationality.

| No. | Pos. | Nation | Player |
|---|---|---|---|
| — | MF | MNE | Armin Bosnjak (to (Montenegro) FK Jezero) |
| — | GK | | Zulfairuuz Rudy (to Geylang International) |
| — | DF | | Hamizan Hisham (to) |
| — | DF | | Baihakki Khaizan (Retired) |
| — | DF | | Madhu Mohana (to) |
| — | DF | | Daniel Bennett (to Tanjong Pagar United) |
| — | MF | | Huzaifah Aziz (to Geylang International) |
| — | FW | | Fazrul Nawaz (to) |

Retained: Note: Flags indicate national team as defined under FIFA eligibility rules; some limited exceptions apply. Players may hold more than one non-FIFA nationality.

| No. | Pos. | Nation | Player |
|---|---|---|---|
| — | MF | JPN | Kyoga Nakamura |
| — | MF | SRB | Zehrudin Mehmedovic |
| — | FW | MNE | Boris Kopitovic |
| — | GK | SGP | Syazwan Buhari |
| — | GK | SGP | Danial Iliya |
| — | DF | SGP | Ryaan Sanizal |
| — | DF | SGP | Irfan Najeeb |
| — | DF | SGP | Irwan Shah |
| — | DF | SGP | Amirul Haikal |
| — | MF | SGP | Iman Hakim |
| — | MF | SGP | Marc Ryan Tan |
| — | MF | SGP | Yasir Hanapi |
| — | MF | SGP | Taufik Suparno |

=== Tanjong Pagar United ===
In: Note: Flags indicate national team as defined under FIFA eligibility rules; some limited exceptions apply. Players may hold more than one non-FIFA nationality.

| No. | Pos. | Nation | Player |
|---|---|---|---|
| — | MF | CRO | Mirko Sugic (from (Croatia) NK Dubrava) |
| — | DF | | Daniel Bennett (from Tampines Rovers) |
| — | MF | | Faizal Raffi (from Balestier Khalsa) |
| — | MF | | Aqhari Abdullah (from Lion City Sailors) |
| — | FW | | Khairul Nizam (from Hougang United) |

Out: Note: Flags indicate national team as defined under FIFA eligibility rules; some limited exceptions apply. Players may hold more than one non-FIFA nationality.

| No. | Pos. | Nation | Player |
|---|---|---|---|
| — | MF | AUS | Blake Ricciuto (to (Australia) ) |
| — | FW | BRA | Luiz Júnior (to (El Salvador) C.D. Águila) |
| — | GK | | Hariz Farid (Retired) |
| — | DF | | Prakash Raj (to) |
| — | DF | | Shahib Masnawi (to) |
| — | DF | | Julian Tan Jian Tang (to) |
| — | DF | | Delwinder Singh (to Balestier Khalsa) |
| — | MF | | Ammirul Emmran (to Balestier Khalsa) |
| — | MF | | Suhairi Sabri (to) |
| — | MF | | Ridhuan Muhammad (Retired) |
| — | FW | | Anaqi Ismit (loan return to Lion City Sailors) |
| — | FW | | Daniel Martens (to) |

Retained: Note: Flags indicate national team as defined under FIFA eligibility rules; some limited exceptions apply. Players may hold more than one non-FIFA nationality.

| No. | Pos. | Nation | Player |
|---|---|---|---|
| — | MF | JPN | Shodai Nishikawa |
| — | FW | JPN | Reo Nishiguchi |
| — | GK | SGP | Zharfan Rohaizad |
| — | GK | SGP | Fashah Iskandar |
| — | DF | SGP | Faritz Hameed |
| — | DF | SGP | Shahrin Saberin |
| — | DF | SGP | Rusyaidi Salime |
| — | DF | SGP | Shakir Hamzah |
| — | DF | SGP | Emmeric Ong |
| — | MF | SGP | Naufal Ilham |
| — | MF | SGP | Raihan Rahman |
| — | MF | SGP | Hadiputradila Saswadimata |
| — | MF | SGP | Fathullah Rahmat |
| — | FW | SGP | Khairul Amri |

=== Young Lions FC ===
In: Note: Flags indicate national team as defined under FIFA eligibility rules; some limited exceptions apply. Players may hold more than one non-FIFA nationality.

| No. | Pos. | Nation | Player |
|---|---|---|---|
| — | GK | | Umayr Sujuandy (from Singapore Sport School) |
| — | GK | | Wayne Chew (from SAFSA) |
| — | DF | | Harith Kanadi (from SAFSA) |
| — | FW | | Zikos Vasileios Chua (from SAFSA) |
| — | FW | | Irfan Iskandar (from Singapore Sport School) |

Out: Note: Flags indicate national team as defined under FIFA eligibility rules; some limited exceptions apply. Players may hold more than one non-FIFA nationality.

| No. | Pos. | Nation | Player |
|---|---|---|---|
| — | GK | | Martyn Mun (loan return to Balestier Khalsa) |
| — | GK | | Putra Anugerah (loan return to Lion City Sailors) |
| — | DF | | Danish Irfan (loan return to Geylang International) |
| — | DF | | Alif Iskandar (to) |
| — | DF | | Nazhiim Harman (to Hougang United) |
| — | DF | | Zulqarnaen Suzliman (loan return to Lion City Sailors) |
| — | MF | | Hami Syahin (loan return to Lion City Sailors) |

Retained: Note: Flags indicate national team as defined under FIFA eligibility rules; some limited exceptions apply. Players may hold more than one non-FIFA nationality.

| No. | Pos. | Nation | Player |
|---|---|---|---|
| — | GK | SGP | Ridhwan Fikri |
| — | DF | SGP | Raoul Suhaimi |
| — | DF | SGP | Syabil Hisham |
| — | DF | SGP | Ryhan Stewart |
| — | MF | SGP | Amir Syafiz |
| — | MF | SGP | Danish Qayyum |
| — | MF | SGP | Rezza Rezky |
| — | MF | SGP | Jared Gallagher |
| — | FW | SGP | Ilhan Fandi |
| — | FW | SGP | Khairin Nadim |
| — | FW | SGP | Glenn Kweh |
