= 2021 Balestier Khalsa FC season =

Balestier Khalsa
2021 season
- Chairman: S Thavaneson
- Head coach: Marko Kraljević
- Stadium: Bishan Stadium
- Singapore Cup: –

The 2021 season was Balestier Khalsa's 26th consecutive season in the top flight of Singapore football and in the Singapore Premier League and the Singapore Cup.

== Squad ==
=== Singapore Premier League ===
As of 21 September 2018.

No.	Name	Nationality	Date of birth (age)	Previous club	Contract since	Contract end
Goalkeepers
1	Kimura Riki ^{U23}	(Singapore) (Japan)	14 November 2000 (age 26)	(Singapore) Lion City Sailors FC	2021	2021
25	Zacharial Leong ^{U23}	(Singapore)	6 April 1998 (age 28)	Youth Team	2019	2021
Defenders
2	Fadli Kamis	(Singapore)	7 November 1992 (age 34)	(Singapore) Young Lions FC	2016	2021
5	Ensar Brunčević	(Serbia)	13 February 1999 (age 27)	(Serbia) FK Spartak Subotica II (T2)	2020	2022
13	Amer Hakeem ^{U23}	(Singapore)	8 November 1998 (age 28)	(Singapore) Young Lions FC	2021	2022
17	Sameer Alassane ^{U23}	(Singapore) (Mali)	24 December 2000 (age 25)	Youth Team	2019	2021
18	Ahmad Syahir	(Singapore)	10 April 1992 (age 34)	Youth Team	2013	2021
22	Khalili Khalif	(Singapore)	3 January 1997 (age 29)	(Singapore) SAFSA	2021	2021
24	Ho Wai Loon	(Singapore)	20 August 1993 (age 33)	(Singapore) Lion City Sailors FC	2021	2021
39	Aiman Zavyan ^{U23}	(Singapore)	7 June 2002 (age 24)	(Singapore) Geylang International U19	2020	2021
Midfielders
3	Max Goh Yi Qi ^{U23}	(Singapore)	6 March 1998 (age 28)	(Singapore) Project Vaults FC	2021	2021
4	Faizal Raffi	(Singapore)	20 January 1996 (age 30)	(Singapore) Warriors FC	2020	2021
6	Aarish Kumar ^{U23}	(Singapore)	19 May 1999 (age 27)	(Singapore) Warriors FC	2020	2021
8	Kristijan Krajcek	(Croatia)	1 October 1993 (age 33)	(Croatia) NK BSK Bijelo Brdo (T2)	2019	2021
14	Hariysh Krishnakumar ^{U23}	(Singapore)	23 October 2002 (age 24)	(Singapore) Geylang International U19	2021	2021
15	Gautam Selvamany	(Singapore)	10 November 1996 (age 30)	(Singapore) Warriors Prime League	2021	2021
28	Gareth Low	(Singapore)	28 February 1997 (age 29)	(Singapore) Albirex Niigata (S)	2021	2021
Forwards
7	Hazzuwan Halim	(Singapore)	2 February 1994 (age 32)	(Singapore) Tanjong Pagar United	2015	2021
9	Shuhei Hoshino	(Japan)	19 December 1995 (age 30)	(South Korea) Busan Transportation FC (T3)	2020	2021
10	Šime Žužul	(Croatia)	10 January 1996 (age 30)	(Croatia) NK Hrvatski Dragovoljac (T2)	2019	2021
11	Iqbal Hussain	(Singapore)	6 June 1993 (age 33)	(India) Chennai City FC	2021	2021
Players who left during season
12	Jordan Emaviwe ^{U23}	(Singapore) (Nigeria)	9 April 2001 (age 25)	(Italy) F.C. Castiglione (I3)	2020	2021
19	Zaiful Nizam (Captain) ^{>30}	(Singapore)	24 July 1987 (age 39)	(Singapore) Gombak United	2013	2021
61	Martyn Mun ^{U21}	(Singapore)	7 January 2000 (age 26)	(Singapore) Jungfrau Punggol FC (NFL)	2020	2021

== Coaching staff ==
Position	Name
Team Manager	Darwin Jalil
General Manager	Tim Nee Cheng
Head Coach	(Croatia) Marko Kraljević
Academy Manager	Syed Azmir
Assistant Coach	Nasaruddin Jalil
Assistant Coach	Nasruldin Baharuddin
Goalkeeping Coach	Yazid Yasin
Fitness Coach	Rosman Sulaiman
Physiotherapist	Mohamed Nasser
Kitman	

== Transfer ==
=== In ===
Pre-Season

Position	Player	Transferred From	Ref
DF	(Singapore) Amer Hakeem	(Singapore) Young Lions FC	2 years contract signed in 2020
MF	(Singapore) Gareth Low Jun Kit	(Singapore) Albirex Niigata (S)	
MF	(Singapore) Hariysh Krishnakumar	(Singapore) Geylang International U19	
MF	(Singapore) Gautam Selvamany	Free Agent	
MF	(France) Yann Weishaupt	(Singapore) Project Vaults FC	
FW	(Singapore) Joshua De Souza	Free Agent	

Mid-Season

Position	Player	Transferred From	Ref
MF	(Singapore) Max Goh Yi Qi	Free agent	
FW	(Singapore) Iqbal Hussain	(India) Chennai City F.C.	Free

=== Out ===
Pre-Season

Position	Player	Transferred To	Ref
GK	(Singapore) Hafiz Ahmad	(Singapore) Project Vaults FC	
DF	(Singapore) R Aaravin	Retired	
DF	(Singapore) Jufri Taha	(Singapore)	
DF	(Singapore) Danish Uwais	(Singapore)	
DF	(Singapore) (Italy) Christian Chiang Moroni	(Singapore)	
DF	(Singapore) Yeo Hai Ngee	(Singapore)	
MF	(Singapore) Karthik Raj	(Singapore)	
MF	(Singapore) Zulfadhmi Suzliman	(Singapore)	
MF	(Singapore) Elijah Lim Teck Yong	(Singapore) Geylang International	Free

Mid-Season

Position	Player	Transferred To	Ref
GK	(Singapore) Zaiful Nizam	(Singapore) Geylang International	Terminated

=== Loan In ===
Pre-Season

Position	Player	Transferred From	Ref
GK	(Singapore) (Japan) Kimura Riki	(Singapore) Lion City Sailors	Season loan

Mid-Season

Position	Player	Transferred From	Ref
DF	(Singapore) Ho Wai Loon	(Singapore) Lion City Sailors	Season loan

=== Loan Return ===
Mid-Season

Position	Player	Transferred To	Ref
DF	(Singapore) Khalili Khalif	(Singapore) SAFSA	Loan Return

=== Loan Out ===
Pre-Season

Position	Player	Transferred To	Ref
DF	(Singapore) Khalili Khalif	(Singapore)	NS till 2022
DF	(Singapore) Shaqi Sulaiman	(Singapore)	NS till 2021
FW	(Singapore) Syukri Noorhaizam	(Singapore)	NS till 2022

Mid-Season

Position	Player	Transferred To	Ref
GK	(Singapore) Martyn Mun	(Singapore) Young Lions FC	Season loan
MF	(Singapore) (Nigeria) Jordan Emaviwe	(Singapore) SAFSA	NS till 2023

=== Extension / Retained ===
Position	Player	Ref
FW	(Singapore) Hazzuwan Halim	2 years contract signed in 2019
FW	(Croatia) Šime Žužul	2 year contract signed in 2019
FW	(Japan) Shuhei Hoshino	1 years contract signed in 2020
DF	(Serbia) Ensar Brunčević	2 years contract signed in 2020
MF	(Croatia) Kristijan Krajcek	1 year contract signed in 2020
DF	(Singapore) Ahmad Syahir	1 year contract signed in 2020
GK	(Singapore) Zacharial Leong	1 year contract signed in 2020
DF	(Singapore) Aiman Zavyan	
DF	(Singapore) Fadli Kamis	
MF	(Singapore) (Nigeria) Jordan Emaviwe	
MF	(Singapore) Aarish Kumar	
MF	(Singapore) Faizal Raffi	
GK	(Singapore) Zaiful Nizam	

== Friendly ==
=== Pre-Season Friendly ===
Win Draw Loss

6 March 2021 1	Geylang International (Singapore)	2–1	(Singapore) Balestier Khalsa	Our Tampines Hub
	Christopher van Huizen; Zikos Vasileios Chua		Joshua De Souza	Attendance: 0 (Note: Due to Covid 19, this match is played behind closed door.)

=== In-season friendlies ===
Win Draw Loss

30 April 2021 1	Lion City Sailors (Singapore)	4–0	(Singapore) Balestier Khalsa	Jalan Besar Stadium
	Amiruldin Asraf; Faris Ramli (pen.)			Attendance: 0

25 June 2021 3	Lion City Sailors (Singapore)	4–2	(Singapore) Balestier Khalsa	Jalan Besar Stadium
	Stipe Plazibat; Song Ui-young; Hariss Harun		Shuhei Hoshino; Gareth Low	Attendance: 0

2 July 2021 4	Tanjong Pagar United (Singapore)	1–2	(Singapore) Balestier Khalsa	Jurong East Stadium
			Shuhei Hoshino	Attendance: 0

== Team statistics ==
=== Appearances and goals ===
As of 10 Oct 2021

Numbers in parentheses denote appearances as substitute.

No.	Pos.	Player	Sleague		Total	
No.	Pos.	Player	Apps.	Goals	Apps.	Goals
1	GK	(Singapore) (Japan) Kimura Riki	5	0	5	0
2	DF	(Singapore) Fadli Kamis	18+3	0	21	0
3	MF	(Singapore) Max Goh Yi Qi	0	0	0	0
4	MF	(Singapore) Faizal Raffi	8+6	2	14	2
5	DF	(Serbia) Ensar Brunčević	18	1	18	1
6	MF	(Singapore) Aarish Kumar	8	0	8	0
7	FW	(Singapore) Hazzuwan Halim	18+2	3	20	3
8	MF	(Croatia) Kristijan Krajcek	17	6	17	6
9	FW	(Japan) Shuhei Hoshino	20+1	3	21	3
10	FW	(Croatia) Šime Žužul	15+5	15	20	15
11	FW	(Singapore) Iqbal Hussain	1+5	0	6	0
13	DF	(Singapore) Amer Hakeem	18	1	18	1
14	MF	(Singapore) Hariysh Krishnakumar	2+7	0	9	0
15	MF	(Singapore) Gautam Selvamany	0+6	0	6	0
17	DF	(Singapore) (Mali) Sameer Alassane	0	0	0	0
18	DF	(Singapore) Ahmad Syahir	15+3	0	18	0
22	DF	(Singapore) Khalili Khalif	0	0	0	0
24	DF	(Singapore) Ho Wai Loon	7+1	0	8	0
25	GK	(Singapore) Zacharial Leong	3	0	3	0
28	MF	(Singapore) Gareth Low	17+3	0	20	0
39	DF	(Singapore) Aiman Zavyan	1+6	0	7	0
44	DF	(Singapore) Aravindan Ramanathan	0+1	0	1	0
45	FW	(Singapore) Joshua De Souza	2+2	0	4	0
46	DF	(Singapore) Aqil Yazid	4+2	0	6	0
55	MF	(Singapore) Aidil Johari	11+3	1	14	1
66	FW	(Singapore) Puvan Raj Sivalingam	10+2	2	12	2
Players who have played this season but had left the club or on loan to other club
12	MF	(Singapore) (Nigeria) Jordan Emaviwe	0	0	0	0
19	GK	(Singapore) Zaiful Nizam	13	0	13	0
61	GK	(Singapore) Martyn Mun	0+1	0	1	0

== Competitions ==
=== Overview ===
Competition	Record							
Competition	P	W	D	L	GF	GA	GD	Win %

=== Singapore Premier League ===
Win Draw Loss

14 March 2021 1	Young Lions FC (Singapore)	3–3	(Singapore) Balestier Khalsa	Jalan Besar Stadium
	Ilhan Fandi 13'; Khairin Nadim 58'; Hami Syahin 85'; Ryhan Stewart (yellow card) 83'; Harhys Stewart (yellow card) 87'	Report	Hazzuwan Halim 33' (pen.); Shuhei Hoshino 45+1' 49'; Gareth Low (yellow card) 82'	Attendance: 0 Referee: Ahmad A'qashah

17 March 2021 2	Balestier Khalsa (Singapore)	1–2	(Singapore) Tampines Rovers	Toa Payoh Stadium
	Amer Hakeem 67' (yellow card) 31'; Kristijan Krajcek (yellow card) 38'; Hazzuwan Halim (yellow card) 68'; Faizal Raffi (yellow card) 73'; Ensar Brunčević (yellow card) 82'	Report	Taufik Suparno 55'; Boris Kopitović 70'; Madhu Mohana (yellow card) 45+2'	Attendance: 0 Referee: Abirami Naidu

21 March 2021 3	Albirex Niigata (S) (Japan)	0–0	(Singapore) Balestier Khalsa	Jurong East Stadium
			Sime Zuzul (yellow card) 90+5'	Attendance: 0 Referee: Syarqawi Buhari

4 April 2021 4	Balestier Khalsa (Singapore)	4–0	(Singapore) Tanjong Pagar United	Toa Payoh Stadium
	Faizal Raffi 24'; Kristijan Krajcek 41' 89'; Šime Žužul 55'; Fadli Kamis (yellow card) 51'	Report	Khairul Amri (yellow card) 67'; Faritz Abdul Hameed (yellow card) 90'	Attendance: 0 Referee: Muhammad Taqi

7 April 2021 5	Balestier Khalsa (Singapore)	2–1	(Singapore) Geylang International	Toa Payoh Stadium
	Kristijan Krajcek 36'; Ensar Brunčević 45+1' (yellow card) 57'; Amer Hakeem (yellow card) 39'; Ahmad Syahir (yellow card) 81'; Shuhei Hoshino (yellow card) 90+1'; Hazzuwan Halim (yellow card) 90+3'	Report	Amy Recha 53' (yellow card) 57'	Attendance: 0 Referee: Taufik Thana

10 April 2021 6	Balestier Khalsa (Singapore)	0–1	(Singapore) Hougang United	Toa Payoh Stadium
	Ensar Brunčević (red card) 21'; Ahmad Syahir (yellow card) 72'; Aarish Kumar (yellow card) 72'	Report	Tomoyuki Doi 63'; Maksat Dzhakybaliev (yellow card) 74'	Attendance: 0 Referee: Y.Sathyakumar

18 April 2021 7	Lion City Sailors (Singapore)	4–1	(Singapore) Balestier Khalsa	Jalan Besar Stadium
	Gabriel Quak 7'; Shahdan Sulaiman 18' (yellow card) 63'; Stipe Plazibat 47'; Saifullah Akbar 51'	Report	Kristijan Krajcek 25'; Hazzuwan Halim (yellow card) 75'	Referee: Muhd Syarqawi

9 May 2021 8	Hougang United (Singapore)	4–3	(Singapore) Balestier Khalsa	Hougang Stadium
	Kaishu Yamazaki 9'; Lionel Tan 29'; Idraki Adnan 36'; Hafiz Sujad 87'; Ridhuan Barudin (yellow card) 56'; Muhaimin Suhaimi (yellow card) 61'; Nazrul Nazari (yellow card) 88'	Report	Šime Žužul 3'; Faizal Raffi 45'; Kristijan Krajcek 72' (yellow card) 78'; Marko Kraljević (yellow card) 45+2'	Attendance: 0 Referee: Ahmad A'qasyah

25 April 2021 9 (Rescheduled)	Balestier Khalsa (Singapore)	1–4	(Japan) Albirex Niigata (S)	Toa Payoh Stadium
	Šime Žužul 57'; Ensar Brunčević (yellow card) 27'	Report	Kiyoshiro Tsuboi 28' (pen.) 47' 87'; Kuraba Kondo 53'	Attendance: 0 (Note: Due to the COVID-19 pandemic, this match was played behind closed doors.); Referee: Zulfiqar Mustaffa

23 May 2021 10	Tanjong Pagar United (Singapore)	2–2	(Singapore) Balestier Khalsa	Jurong East Stadium
	Šime Žužul 61' 87'	Report	Reo Nishiguchi 32'; Khairul Amri 85' (pen.); Anaqi Ismit (yellow card) 77'; Raihan Rahman (yellow card) 81'	Attendance: 0 Referee: Juherman Zaiton

15 May 2021 11 (Rescheduled)	Tampines Rovers (Singapore)	5–1	(Singapore) Balestier Khalsa	Our Tampines Hub
	Boris Kopitović 9' 24' (pen.); Marc Ryan Tan 13' 35'; Ryaan Sanizal 88'	Report	Šime Žužul 20' (pen.); Aqil Yazid (yellow card) 9'; Gautam Selvamany (yellow card) 52'; Ahmad Syahir (yellow card) 84'	Attendance: 0 Referee: Jansen Foo

25 July 2021 12 (Rescheduled)	Geylang International (Singapore)	3–1	(Singapore) Balestier Khalsa	Our Tampines Hub
	Amy Recha 41' 63' (yellow card) 62'; Matheus Moresche 54'; Harith Kanadi (yellow card) 35'	Report	Šime Žužul 11'; Kimura Riki (yellow card) 24'	Referee: Taufik Thana

31 July 2021 13 (Rescheduled)	Balestier Khalsa (Singapore)	2–3	(Singapore) Young Lions FC	Toa Payoh Stadium
	Hazzuwan Halim 47'; Šime Žužul 89'; Kristijan Krajcek (yellow card) 34'; Zulqarnaen Suzliman (yellow card) 90+4'	Report	Hami Syahin 18' (pen.); Daniel Goh 35'; Harhys Stewart 85'; Nazhiim Harman (yellow card) 5'	Referee: Jansen Foo

8 August 2021 14 (Rescheduled)	Balestier Khalsa (Singapore)	1–1	(Singapore) Lion City Sailors	Toa Payoh Stadium
	Šime Žužul 60'; Shuhei Hoshino (yellow card) 56'; Ensar Brunčević (yellow card) 90+1' (yellow-red card) 90+3'; Zaiful Nizam (yellow card) 90+2'	Report	Stipe Plazibat 90+4'; Faris Ramli (yellow card) 53'; Saifullah Akbar (yellow card) 58'; Jorge Fellipe (yellow card) 90'	Referee: Ahmad A'qashah

14 August 2021 15 (Rescheduled)	Young Lions FC (Singapore)	4–2	(Singapore) Balestier Khalsa	Jalan Besar Stadium
	Ilhan Fandi 18' 45+1'; Jacob Mahler 28'; Khairin Nadim 41'; Ryhan Stewart (yellow card) 77'; Alif Iskandar (yellow card) 90'	Report	Šime Žužul 68' 75'; Fadli Kamis (yellow card) 11'; Hazzuwan Halim (yellow card) 42'; Ahmad Syahir (yellow card) 45'	Referee: Syarqawi Buhari

19 August 2021 16 (Rescheduled)	Balestier Khalsa (Singapore)	5–2	(Singapore) Tampines Rovers	Toa Payoh Stadium
	Kristijan Krajcek 9'; Šime Žužul 13' 61' 89'; Shuhei Hoshino 65'; Gareth Low (yellow card) 35'; Aidil Johari (yellow card) 35'	Report	Zehrudin Mehmedović 17' 40' (yellow card) 35'; Irwan Shah (yellow card) 25'; Armin Bosnjak (yellow card) 35'; Baihakki Khaizan (yellow card) 90'	Referee: Nathan Chan

28 August 2021 17 (Rescheduled)	Albirex Niigata (S) (Japan)	4–0	(Singapore) Balestier Khalsa	Jurong East Stadium
	Ryoya Tanigushi 47' 77'; Kuraba Kondo 51' 65'; Kazuki Hashioka (yellow card) 5'	Report	Gareth Low (yellow card) 30'; Ho Wai Loon (yellow card) 59'	Referee: Farhad Mohamed

12 September 2021 18 (Rescheduled)	Balestier Khalsa (Singapore)	1–0	(Singapore) Tanjong Pagar United	Toa Payoh Stadium
	Hazzuwan Halim 47'; Puvan Raj (yellow card) 55'; Ahmad Syahir (yellow card) 62'; Ho Wai Loon (yellow card) 65'	Report	Blake Ricciuto (yellow card) 71'; Rusyaidi Salime (yellow card) 90+7'	Referee: Taufik Thana

3 October 2021 19 (Rescheduled)	Geylang International (Singapore)	3–0	(Singapore) Balestier Khalsa	Our Tampines Hub
	Amy Recha 61'; Ensar Brunčević 63' (o.g.); Matheus Moresche 73'; Ilhan Noor (yellow card) 85'; Christopher van Huizen (yellow card) 87'	Report	Ensar Brunčević (yellow card) 53'; Amer Hakeem (yellow card) 67'	Referee: Syarqawi Buhari

6 October 2021 20 (Rescheduled)	Balestier Khalsa (Singapore)	3–2	(Singapore) Hougang United	Toa Payoh Stadium
	Puvan Raj Sivalingam 10' 35'; Šime Žužul 85'	Report	Gilberto Fortunato 53'; Shawal Anuar 62'; Muhaimin Suhaimi (yellow card) 66'; Maksat Dzhakybaliev (yellow card) 67'	Referee: Hilmi Fuad

10 October 2021 21 (Rescheduled)	Lion City Sailors (Singapore)	4–1	(Singapore) Balestier Khalsa	Jalan Besar Stadium
	Song Ui-young 8'; Gabriel Quak 42' 82'; Diego Lopes 78'; Nur Adam Abdullah (yellow card) 71'; Adam Swandi (yellow card) 79' (yellow-red card) 87'	Report	Aidil Johari 31'; Hazzuwan Halim (yellow card) 44'; Ensar Brunčević (yellow card) 47'; Hariysh Krishnakumar (yellow card) 89'	Referee: Juherman Zaiton

Table

Pos	Team	Pld	W	D	L	GF	GA	GD	Pts	Qualification or relegation
4	Tampines Rovers	21	7	6	8	48	51	−3	27	Qualification for AFC Cup group stage
5	Tanjong Pagar United	21	5	7	9	36	49	−13	22	
6	Geylang International	21	6	2	13	33	52	−19	20	
7	Balestier Khalsa	21	5	4	12	34	52	−18	19	
8	Young Lions (Note: The foreign club – Albirex Niigata (S) – as well as the Football Association of Singapore (FAS) under-21 team, Young Lions, are ineligible for any AFC competition spots.)	21	4	4	13	26	50	−24	16	

Updated to match(es) played on 3 April 2021. Source: Singapore Premier League
Rules for classification: 1) points; 2) goal difference; 3) number of goals scored; 4) number of wins
