= Hari McCoy =

English footballer (born 2002)

Personal information
- Date of birth: 11 September 2002 (age 24)
- Place of birth: England
- Position: Winger

Team information
- Current team: Clapton F.C.

Youth career
- 2018-2019: Tampines Rovers
- 2019-2021: Rio Ave

Senior career*
Years	Team	Apps	(Gls)
2021	San Luca	0	(0)
2022	Balestier Khalsa	1	(0)
2022–2023	Weymouth	2	(0)
2023–	Clapton	0	(0)
- * Club domestic league appearances and goals as of 10:36, 14 November 2022 (UTC)

Hari Connor Vinay McCoy (born 11 September 2002) is an English footballer who plays as a winger for Clapton.

== Club career ==
=== Tampines Rovers ===
As a youth player, McCoy joined Tampines Rovers in 2018.

=== ASD San Luca ===
Before the second half of 2020–21, he signed for Serie D side ASD San Luca in Italy after joining the youth academy of Portuguese club Rio Ave in 2019.

=== Balestier Khalsa ===
Before the 2022 season, he signed for Balestier Khalsa in Singapore and later debuted on 8 May 2022 against Tampines Rovers.

=== Weymouth ===
In November 2022, he joined National League South side Weymouth.

== Career statistics ==
=== Club ===
As of 13 Jan 2024.

Appearances and goals by club, season and competition
Club	Season	League			National cup		League cup		Other		Total	
Club	Season	Division	Apps	Goals	Apps	Goals	Apps	Goals	Apps	Goals	Apps	Goals
Balestier Khalsa	2022	Singapore Premier League	1	0	0	0	0	0	0	0	1	0
Weymouth	2022–23	National League South	1	0	0	0	1	0	0	0	2	0
Clapton	2023–24	Eastern Counties Football League	6	1	0	0	0	0	0	0	6	1
Career total			9	1	0	0	0	0	0	0	3	0

== Personal life ==
McCoy is eligible to represent Singapore and England at international level.
