= Harith Kanadi =

Singaporean footballer

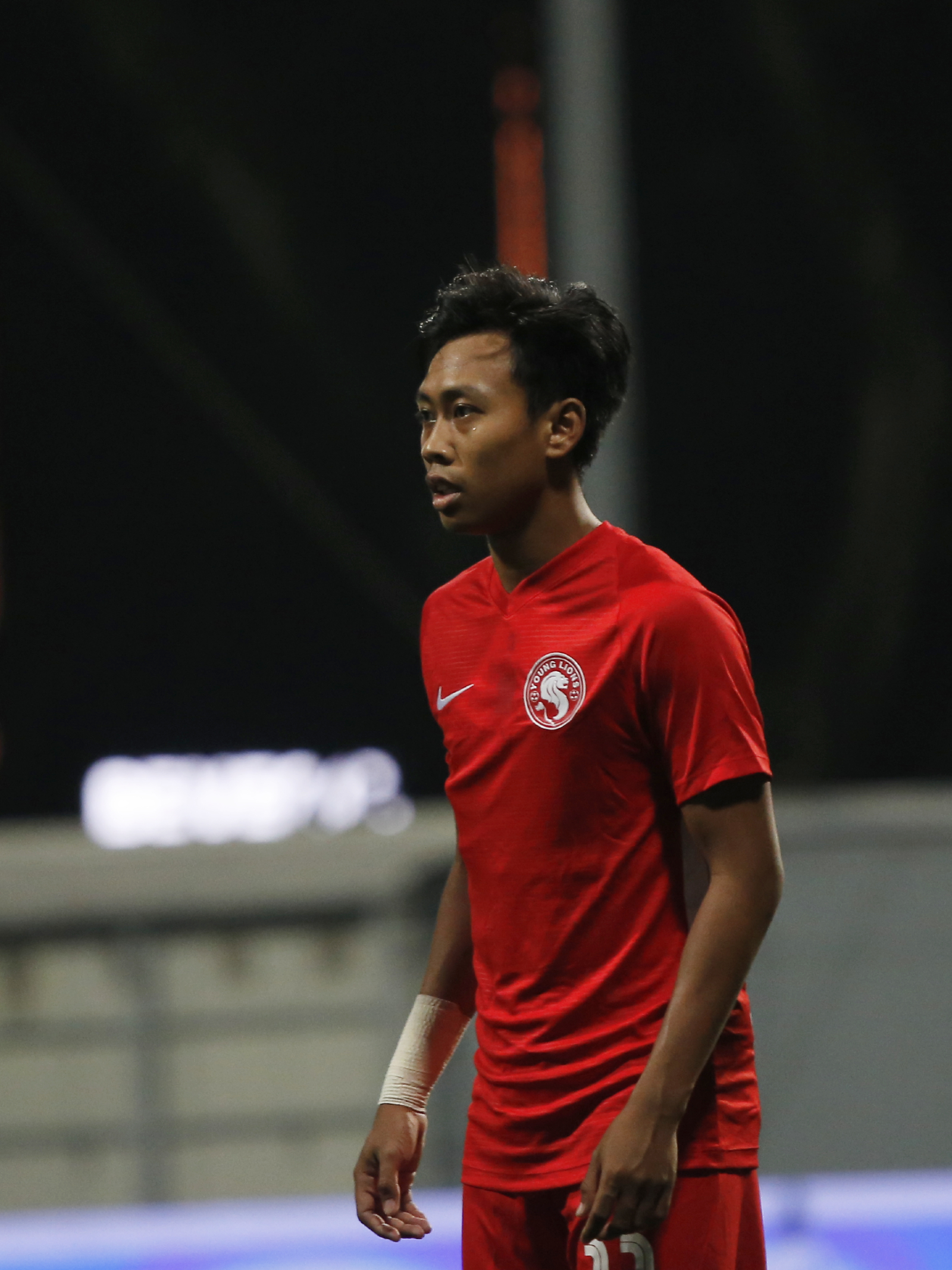
- Harith playing for Young Lions in 2023

Personal information
- Full name: Muhammad Harith bin Kanadi
- Date of birth: 1 August 2000 (age 26)
- Place of birth: Singapore
- Position: Left-back

Team information
- Current team: Balestier Khalsa

Youth career
- 2017–2018: Tampines Rovers

Senior career*
Years	Team	Apps	(Gls)
2019–2021	Geylang International	31	(0)
2022–2023	→ Young Lions (loan)	33	(1)
2023-2024	Lion City Sailors	0	(0)
2024–	Balestier Khalsa	45	(1)

International career
2022	Singapore U23	2	(0)
- * Club domestic league appearances and goals as of 15 May 2026

Muhammad Harith bin Kanadi (born 1 August 2000) is a Singaporean footballer currently playing as a left-back for Singapore Premier League club Balestier Khalsa. Harith can use both feet to his advantage.

== Club career ==
=== Geylang International ===
Harith was part of Tampines Rovers academy product but he was released at the end of 2018 and therefore signed his first professional contract for rivals, Geylang International ahead of the 2019 Singapore Premier League season.

==== Loan to Young Lions ====
On 22 February 2022, Harith joined Young Lions as he is undergoing his National Service in the Army.

=== Lion City Sailors ===
On 25 August 2023, Harith signed for Lion City Sailors one day after he completed his National Service. He make his debut for the club on 25 September 2023 coming on as a substitution in the 2023 Singapore Cup against Balestier Khalsa.

=== Balestier Khalsa ===
Four months after joining Lion City Sailors, Harith was released by the club and on 9 January 2024, he joined Balestier Khalsa.

== International career ==
Harith was invited for the national team training on 3 and 10 March 2020. This was his first involvement with the senior side.

== Career statistics ==
=== Club ===
As of 15 May 2026.

Club	Season	League			Singapore Cup		Asia		Total	
Club	Season	Division	Apps	Goals	Apps	Goals	Apps	Goals	Apps	Goals
Geylang International	2019	Singapore Premier League	1	0	5	0	0	0	6	0
Geylang International	2020	Singapore Premier League	14	0	0	0	0	0	14	0
Geylang International	2021	Singapore Premier League	16	0	0	0	0	0	16	0
Geylang International	Total		31	0	5	0	0	0	36	0
Young Lions	2022	Singapore Premier League	16	0	2	0	0	0	18	0
Young Lions	2023	Singapore Premier League	17	1	0	0	0	0	17	1
Young Lions	Total		33	1	2	0	0	0	35	1
Lion City Sailors	2023	Singapore Premier League	0	0	2	0	0	0	2	0
Lion City Sailors	Total		0	0	2	0	0	0	2	0
Balestier Khalsa	2024–25	Singapore Premier League	29	1	4	0	0	0	33	1
Balestier Khalsa	2025–26	Singapore Premier League	16	0	5	0	0	0	21	0
Balestier Khalsa	Total		45	1	9	0	0	0	54	1
Geylang International	2026–27	Singapore Premier League	6	0	0	0	0	0	6	0
Geylang International	Total		6	0	0	0	0	0	6	0
Career total			115	2	18	0	0	0	133	2

=== International ===
==== U23 International caps ====
No	Date	Venue	Opponent	Result	Competition
1	7 May 2022	Thiên Trường Stadium, Nam Định, Vietnam	Laos	2–2 (draw)	2021 Southeast Asian Games
2	9 May 2022	Thiên Trường Stadium, Nam Định, Vietnam	Thailand	0–5 (lost)	2021 Southeast Asian Games

== Honours ==
=== Lion City Sailors ===
- Singapore Cup: 2023
