= Riki Kimura =

Singaporean footballer

Personal information
- Full name: Riki Kimura
- Date of birth: 14 November 2000 (age 26)
- Place of birth: Singapore
- Height: 1.91 m (6 ft 3 in)
- Position: Goalkeeper

Team information
- Current team: Tanjong Pagar United
- Number: 28

Youth career
- 2016–2018: National Football Academy

Senior career*
Years	Team	Apps	(Gls)
2019	Warriors	2	(0)
2020	LCS Academy	0	(0)
2021–2022	Balestier Khalsa	5	(0)
2024–	Tanjong Pagar United	7	(0)

International career^{‡}
2017–2018	Singapore U19		
- * Club domestic league appearances and goals as of May 2020 (UTC) ‡ National team caps and goals as of 9 June 2019

Riki Kimura is a Singaporean footballer currently playing as a goalkeeper for Tanjong Pagar United.

== Club career ==
Kimura made his professional debut against Geylang International in 2019.

== Other career ==
Along with several friends, Ilhan Fandi, Danial Scott Crichton, Haziq Alaba and Rasaq Akeem open an online shop selling clothing.

== Career statistics ==
=== Club ===
As of 25 OMay 2025.

Club	Season	League			Singapore Cup		League Cup		AFC Cup		Total	
Club	Season	Division	Apps	Goals	Apps	Goals	Apps	Goals	Apps	Goals	Apps	Goals
Warriors FC	2019	Singapore Premier League	2	0	0	0	0	0	0	0	2	0
Warriors FC	Total		2	0	0	0	0	0	0	0	2	0
Lion City Sailors	2020	Singapore Premier League	0	0	0	0	0	0	0	0	0	0
Lion City Sailors	2021	Singapore Premier League	0	0	0	0	0	0	0	0	0	0
Lion City Sailors	Total		0	0	0	0	0	0	0	0	0	0
Balestier Khalsa	2021	Singapore Premier League	5	0	0	0	0	0	0	0	5	0
Balestier Khalsa	2022	Singapore Premier League	0	0	0	0	0	0	0	0	0	0
Balestier Khalsa	Total		5	0	0	0	0	0	0	0	5	0
Tanjong Pagar United	2024-25	Singapore Premier League	7	0	0	0	0	0	0	0	7	0
Tanjong Pagar United	Total		7	0	0	0	0	0	0	0	7	0
Career total			14	0	0	0	0	0	0	0	14	0
