= Gareth Low =

Singaporean footballer (born 1997)

Personal information
- Full name: Gareth Low Jun Kit
- Date of birth: 28 February 1997 (age 29)
- Place of birth: Singapore
- Height: 1.70 m (5 ft 7 in)
- Position: Midfielder

Team information
- Current team: Geylang International

Youth career
- National Football Academy

Senior career*
Years	Team	Apps	(Gls)
2016	Young Lions	13	(1)
2017	Hougang United	5	(0)
2019	Young Lions	16	(0)
2020	Albirex Niigata (S)	6	(1)
2021–2023	Balestier Khalsa	12	(0)
2023	Geylang International	20	(3)
2024–2025	Albirex Niigata (S)	22	(0)
2025–	Geylang International	10	(0)

International career
2015–	Singapore U19	3	(0)
2015–	Singapore U21		
- * Club domestic league appearances and goals

Gareth Low Jun Kit (born 28 February 1997) is a Singaporean who plays as a central-midfielder, left-midfielder or left-back for Singapore Premier League club Geylang International.

== Club career ==
=== Young Lions ===
Gareth started his professional career at Young Lions in the 2016 season.

=== Hougang United ===
In 2017, Gareth moved to Hougang United on a permanent deal however the following season, he was released by the club.

=== Return to Young Lions ===
After a year without a club, Gareth rejoined his former club, Young Lions.

=== Albirex Niigata Singapore ===
In 2020, Gareth join Albirex Niigata (S) where he won the 2020 Singapore Premier League title with the club.

=== Balestier Khalsa ===
In 2021, Gareth moved to Balestier Khalsa.

=== Geylang International ===
In 2023, Gareth transferred to Geylang International on a free transfer.

=== Return to Albirex Niigata (S) ===
On 6 January 2024, Albirex Niigata (S) announced his return to the club after four years.

== Career statistics ==
=== Club ===
As of match played 30 Sept 2023. Caps and goals may not be correct.

Club	Season	S.League		Singapore Cup		League Cup Charity Shield		Asia		Total	
Club	Season	Apps	Goals	Apps	Goals	Apps	Goals	Apps	Goals	Apps	Goals
Hougang United	2017	5	0	0	0	0	0	0	0	5	0
SAFSA	2018	0	0	0	0	0	0	0	0	0	0
Young Lions FC	2019	6	0	0	0	0	0	0	0	6	0
Albirex Niigata (S)	2020	6	0	0	0	0	0	0	0	6	0
Balestier Khalsa	2021	20	0	0	0	0	0	0	0	20	0
Balestier Khalsa	2022	20	1	5	0	0	0	0	0	25	1
Balestier Khalsa	Total	40	1	5	0	0	0	0	0	45	1
Geylang International	2023	20	3	4	0	0	0	0	0	24	3
Albirex Niigata (S)	2024–25	15	0	0	0	1	0	0	0	16	0
Career Total		92	4	9	0	1	0	0	0	102	4

== International career ==
=== Under-19 ===
Low was called up and captained the Singapore U19 for the friendlies against Bahrain U19 on 31 August and 3 September 2016.

== International Statistics ==
=== U19 International caps ===
No	Date	Venue	Opponent	Result	Competition
1	11 September 2016	Hàng Đẫy Stadium, Hanoi, Vietnam	Vietnam	0-0 (draw)	2016 AFF U-19 Youth Championship
2	15 September 2016	Hàng Đẫy Stadium, Hanoi, Vietnam	Malaysia	1-2 (lost)	2016 AFF U-19 Youth Championship
3	19 September 2016	Hàng Đẫy Stadium, Hanoi, Vietnam	Timor-Leste	0-2 (lost)	2016 AFF U-19 Youth Championship

== Honours ==
=== Club ===
Albirex Niigata (S)

- Singapore Premier League: 2020
