= Amer Hakeem =

Singaporean association football player

Personal information
- Full name: Muhammad Amer Hakeem bin Mohamad Nazri
- Date of birth: 8 November 1998 (age 27)
- Place of birth: Singapore
- Position: Centre-back

Team information
- Current team: Balestier Khalsa
- Number: 13

Youth career
- Hougang United Prime League

Senior career*
Years	Team	Apps	(Gls)
2018–2020	Young Lions FC	10	(0)
2021–	Balestier Khalsa FC	22	(1)

International career
2021–	Singapore	0	(0)
- * Club domestic league appearances and goals as of 15:04, 3 March 2019 (UTC)

Muhammad Amer Hakeem bin Mohamad Nazri, better known as Ameraiko, is a Singaporean professional footballer who plays primarily as a centre-back for Singapore Premier League club Balestier Khalsa.

He is the second son of Nazri Nasir and Sharifah Almaghbouly, former Singapore national football team player.

== Career statistics ==
10 Oct 2021

Club	Season	S.League		Singapore Cup		Singapore League Cup		Asia		Total	
Club	Season	Apps	Goals	Apps	Goals	Apps	Goals	Apps	Goals	Apps	Goals
Young Lions FC	2018	7	0	0	0	0	0	0	0	7	0
Young Lions FC	2019	0	0	0	0	0	0	0	0	0	0
Young Lions FC	2020	3	0	0	0	0	0	0	0	3	0
Young Lions FC	Total	10	0	0	0	0	0	0	0	10	0
Balestier Khalsa	2021	18	1	0	0	0	0	0	0	18	1
Balestier Khalsa	2022	0	0	0	0	0	0	0	0	0	0
Balestier Khalsa	Total	18	1	0	0	0	0	0	0	18	1
