= Aarish Kumar =

Singaporean-Welsh footballer

Personal information
- Full name: Aarish Kumar
- Date of birth: 19 May 1999 (age 27)
- Place of birth: Singapore
- Position: Midfielder

Team information
- Current team: Balestier Khalsa
- Number: 6

Youth career
- Singapore Sports School
- 2018: NFA

Senior career*
Years	Team	Apps	(Gls)
2019	Warriors FC	2	(0)
2020–2022	Balestier Khalsa	28	(0)
- * Club domestic league appearances and goals as of 1 January 2023

Aarish Kumar (born 19 May 1999) is a Singaporean footballer currently playing as a midfielder for Balestier Khalsa.

== Club ==
=== Warriors FC ===
Aarish make his debut in 2019 for the Warriors against Tampines Rovers.

=== Balestier Khalsa FC ===
After Warriors FC was expelled for the 2020 season, Aarish joined Balestier Khalsa FC. His contract is extended for 2021.

== Career statistics ==
As of 15 Aug 2021

Club	Season	League			FA Cup		Other		Total	
Club	Season	Division	Apps	Goals	Apps	Goals	Apps	Goals	Apps	Goals
Warriors FC	2019	Singapore Premier League	2	0	5	0	0	0	7	0
Warriors FC	Total		2	0	5	0	0	0	7	0
Balestier Khalsa	2020	Singapore Premier League	12	0	0	0	0	0	12	0
Balestier Khalsa	2021	Singapore Premier League	8	0	0	0	0	0	8	0
Balestier Khalsa	2022	Singapore Premier League	0	0	0	0	0	0	0	0
Balestier Khalsa	Total		20	0	0	0	0	0	20	0
Career total			22	0	5	0	0	0	27	0
