= Šime Žužul =

Croatian footballer

Personal information
- Date of birth: 10 January 1996 (age 30)
- Place of birth: Split, Croatia
- Height: 1.89 m (6 ft 2 in)
- Position: Forward

Youth career
- –2014: Imotski
- 2014–2015: Hajduk Split

Senior career*
Years	Team	Apps	(Gls)
2014–2015	Hajduk Split B	13	(0)
2015–2016	RNK Split	0	(0)
2015–2016	→ Imotski (loan)	12	(0)
2016–2017	Imotski	14	(2)
2017	Gorica	4	(2)
2017–2018	Deutschlandsberger	29	(4)
2018–2019	Hrvatski Dragovoljac	7	(0)
2019–2021	Balestier Khalsa	52	(30)
2022	Geylang International	27	(18)
2023	Lokomotiv Tashkent	19	(5)
2024	Hibernians	11	(0)
2024	Croatia Zmijavci	12	(0)
2025–2026	Imotski	32	(21)
- * Club domestic league appearances and goals as of 22 August 2026

Šime Žužul (born 10 January 1996) is a Croatian footballer playing as a forward.

== Club career ==
=== Balestier Khalsa ===
Žužul signed for the Tigers for the 2019 Singapore Premier League. Žužul's first season in Singapore saw his team finish as the wooden spoonist of the league but on a personal level, it was a good one for the Croatian who scored 9 goals in 17 league game.

He played for 3 seasons with the tigers and scored a total of 31 goals in 52 matches.

=== Geylang International ===
Žužul signed for Geylang International ahead of the 2022 season, replacing Moresche who left for Central Coast Mariners. He was named in the 2021 Singapore Premier League Team of the Year.

=== Lokomotiv Tashkent ===
After 4 years in Singapore, Žužul joined Uzbekistan club, Lokomotiv Tashkent on 4 January 2023. On 16 March 2023, he scored his first goal for the club scoring a brace on his debut against Andijon-SGS.

== Career statistics ==
=== Club ===
As of 23 Apr 2024

Club	Season	League			Cup		Other		Total	
Club	Season	Division	Apps	Goals	Apps	Goals	Apps	Goals	Apps	Goals
Imotski (loan)	2015–16	2. HNL	12	0	0	0	0	0	12	0
Imotski	2016–17	2. HNL	14	2	0	0	0	0	14	2
Imotski	Total		26	2	0	0	0	0	26	2
Gorica	2016–17	2. HNL	4	2	0	0	2 (Note: Appearances in the 1. HNL playoffs)	0	6	2
Gorica	Total		4	2	0	0	2	0	6	2
Deutschlandsberger	2017–18	Austrian Regionalliga	29	4	1 (Note: Appearances in the Austrian Cup)	0	0	0	30	4
Deutschlandsberger	Total		29	4	1	0	0	0	30	4
Hrvatski Dragovoljac	2018–19	2. HNL	7	0	1 (Note: Appearances in the Croatian Football Cup)	0	0	0	8	0
Hrvatski Dragovoljac	Total		7	0	1	0	0	0	8	0
Balestier Khalsa	2019	Singapore Premier League	17	9	1	1	0	0	18	10
Balestier Khalsa	2020	Singapore Premier League	14	6	0	0	0	0	14	6
Balestier Khalsa	2021	Singapore Premier League	21	15	0	0	0	0	20	15
Balestier Khalsa	Total		52	30	1	1	0	0	53	31
Geylang International	2022	Singapore Premier League	27	18	0	0	0	0	27	18
Geylang International	Total		27	18	0	0	0	0	27	18
Lokomotiv Tashkent	2023	Uzbekistan Pro League	19	5	2	0	0	0	21	5
Lokomotiv Tashkent	Total		19	5	2	0	0	0	21	5
Hibernians	2023–24	Maltese Premier League	9	0	2	0	0	0	11	0
Hibernians	Total		9	0	2	0	0	0	11	0
Career total			166	60	7	1	2	0	175	61

== Honours ==
=== Individual ===
- Singapore Premier League Team of the Year: 2021
- Singapore Premier League Player of the Month: August 2019, August 2021
