= Ho Wai Loon =

Singaporean footballer

Personal information
- Full name: Ho Wai Loon
- Date of birth: 20 August 1993 (age 33)
- Place of birth: Singapore
- Height: 1.69 m (5 ft 6 1/2 in)
- Positions: Central midfielder; left-back

Youth career
- 2011–2012: Balestier Khalsa

Senior career*
Years	Team	Apps	(Gls)
2011–2016	Balestier Khalsa	21	(0)
2017–2018	Warriors	37	(2)
2019–2021	Lion City Sailors	20	(0)
2021	→ Balestier Khalsa (loan)	8	(0)
2022–2023	Balestier Khalsa	47	(4)
2024–2025	Albirex Niigata (S)	14	(0)
2025	Geylang International	0	(0)
2026-	Project Vaults Oxley Sports Club		
Total		147	(6)

International career^{‡}
2019	Singapore U23	3	(0)
2017–2025	Singapore	7	(0)
- * Club domestic league appearances and goals as of 21 March 2023 ‡ National team caps and goals as of 23 March 2023

Ho Wai Loon (Chinese: 何维伦; born 20 August 1993) is a Singaporean former professional footballer who played either as a central-midfielder or left-back. He represented the Singapore national team.

== Education ==
Ho studied at Canberra Primary School, Canberra Secondary School and ITE Yishun. He later joined the Home United Academy.

== Club career ==
=== Balestier Khalsa ===
Ho started his football career in 2011, playing for Balestier Khalsa. Ho was released in 2013 but signed for Balestier again in 2014 for the 2014 S.League season.

In 2015, Ho tore his anterior cruciate ligament (ACL) which kept him out of play for more than a year.

=== Warriors ===
He then signed for Warriors FC ahead of the 2017 S.League season. That was where he gained his first national team call up.

=== Home United ===
In January 2019, Ho joined fellow S.League club Home United.

In March 2020, Ho fractured his right ankle during training.

In April 2021, Ho returned to training with Lion City Sailors (formerly Home United) but found himself out of the club squad. During the mid-season transfer window Ho moved to Balestier Khalsa on loan from till the end of the 2021 season to regain his match fitness.

=== Second stint at Balestier Khalsa ===
Ho later moved to Balestier Khalsa on 12 June 2021 where he was named the team's captain in the 2022 season.

=== Albirex Niigata (S) ===
On 11 January 2024, Ho signed for Albirex Niigata (S) where he was named as the club captain ahead of the 2024–25 season.

=== Geylang International ===
Ho signed for Geylang International on 17 July 2025. However, he made the announcement on 9 August 2025 that he was forced to retire from professional football due to knee issues before the start of the 2025–26 season.

== International career ==
=== Youth ===
Ho played at the 2015 Southeast Asian Games football tournament, although he was sent off for his second yellow card offence in Singapore's must win game against Indonesia U23.

=== Senior ===
Ho was first called up to the senior side in 2017, as a standby player for the friendly against Afghanistan and the 2019 Asian Cup Qualifiers against Bahrain on 23 and 28 March 2017 respectively.

After being included in the national set-up for a year, Ho finally won his first cap for Singapore in a friendly against Fiji on 11 September 2018, coming on as a substitute in the 62nd minute. Ho made his first start and second appearance for the national team against Cambodia on 16 October. However, he scored an own-goal and was eventually substituted early in the 46th minute.

Ho was called up in September 2022 by head coach Takayuki Nishigaya for international friendlies against Vietnam and India on 21 and 24 September.

== Others ==
=== Singapore Selection Squad ===
He was selected as part of the Singapore Selection squad for The Sultan of Selangor's Cup to be held on 6 May 2017.

== Career statistics ==
=== Club ===
As of match played 13 March 2023.

Club	Season	Singapore Premier League		Singapore Cup		Singapore League Cup		Asia		Total	
Club	Season	Apps	Goals	Apps	Goals	Apps	Goals	Apps	Goals	Apps	Goals
Balestier Khalsa	2011	0	0	0	0	0	0	—		0	0
Balestier Khalsa	2012	0	0	0	0	0	0	—		0	0
Balestier Khalsa	2014	5	0	2	0	0	0	—		7	0
Balestier Khalsa	2015	9	0	0	0	4	0	5	0	18	0
Balestier Khalsa	2016	7	0	3	0	4	0	0	0	14	0
Balestier Khalsa	Total	21	0	5	0	8	0	5	0	39	0
Warriors	2017	18	0	0	0	5	1	—		23	1
Warriors	2018	19	2	2	0	0	0	—		21	2
Warriors	Total	37	2	2	0	5	1	0	0	44	3
Club	Season	Singapore Premier League		Singapore Cup		Community Shield		Asia		Total	
Club	Season	Apps	Goals	Apps	Goals	Apps	Goals	Apps	Goals	Apps	Goals
Lion City Sailors	2019	19	0	0	0	0	0	6	0	25	0
Lion City Sailors	2020	1	0	0	0	0	0	0	0	1	0
Lion City Sailors	2021	0	0	0	0	0	0	0	0	0	0
Lion City Sailors	Total	20	0	0	0	0	0	6	0	26	0
Balestier Khalsa (on loan)	2021	8	0	0	0	0	0	—		8	0
Balestier Khalsa	2022	24	0	6	0	0	0	—		30	0
Balestier Khalsa	2023	23	4	1	0	0	0	—		24	4
Balestier Khalsa	Total	55	4	7	0	0	0	0	0	62	4
Albirex Niigata (S)	2024–25	14	0	0	0	1	0	0	0	15	0
Albirex Niigata (S)	Total	14	0	0	0	1	0	0	0	15	0
Career Total		147	6	14	0	14	0	11	0	186	7

=== International statistics ===
Singapore national team
Year	Apps	Goals
2018	2	0
2022	1	0
2023	1	0
Total	4	0

==== International caps ====
No	Date	Venue	Opponent	Result	Competition
1	11 September 2018	Bishan Stadium, Bishan, Singapore	Fiji	2-0 (won)	Friendly
2	16 October 2018	Phnom Penh Olympic Stadium, Phnom Penh, Cambodia	Cambodia	2-1 (won)	Friendly
3	21 September 2022	Thống Nhất Stadium, Ho Chi Minh City, Vietnam	Vietnam	0-4 (lost)	2022 VFF Tri-Nations Series
4	23 March 2023	Mong Kok Stadium, Hong Kong	Hong Kong	1–1 (Draw)	Friendly
5	26 March 2023	Macau Olympic Complex Stadium, Macau	Macau	1–0	Friendly

==== U19 International caps ====
No	Date	Venue	Opponent	Result	Competition
1	8 November 2011	Petaling Jaya Stadium, Selangor, Malaysia	Indonesia	0-3 (lost)	2012 AFC U-19 Championship qualification

== Honours ==
Balestier Khalsa

- Singapore Cup: 2014
- League Cup: 2013

Home United

- Singapore Community Shield: 2019
