= 2022 Singapore Premier League =

5th season of the Singapore Premier League

Singapore Premier League
- Season: 2022
- Champions: Albirex Niigata (S) (5th title)
- AFC Champions League: Lion City Sailors
- AFC Cup: Hougang United
- Matches: 112
- Goals: 506 (4.52 per match)
- Top goalscorer: Boris Kopitović (35 goals)
- Biggest home win: Tanjong Pagar United 8–1 Young Lions (1 October 2022); Lion City Sailors 7–0 Tanjong Pagar United (20 August 2022)
- Biggest away win: Young Lions 1–10 Lion City Sailors (13 August 2022)
- Highest scoring: Hougang United 4–9 Lion City Sailors (26 August 2022)
- Longest winless run: Young Lions (11 matches)
- Longest losing run: Young Lions (8 matches)
- Average attendance: 832

The 2022 Singapore Premier League (also known as the AIA Singapore Premier League due to sponsorship reasons) was the 5th season of the Singapore Premier League, the top-flight Singaporean professional league for football clubs, since its rebranding in 2018. The champions of the 2022 Singapore Premier League should have qualified for the AFC Champions League. The season began in March and ended on 15 October.

Lion City Sailors were the defending champions, having won their third Singapore Premier League title in the previous season. Albirex Niigata (S) won their fifth title.

== Format ==
The following key changes were made to the rules since the 2022 season.

1. Each team is able to register up to 25 players in their squad, a reduction of 3 players as compared from 2020.
2. Albirex is allowed to have a minimum squad of 18 players under professional contract, as at the pre-season minimum registration deadline, and a maximum of 25 players.
3. From 2021, Albirex is allowed to sign a maximum of 2 overage Singaporean players. As in 2019 and 2020, Albirex must have two Singaporeans in their starting lineup for each game.
4. Young Lions is allowed to register a minimum of 20 players as at the pre-season minimum registration deadline, and a maximum of 35 players as at the close of the first registration window.
5. Young Lions and Lion City Sailors to play their home games at Jalan Besar Stadium, while Balestier Khalsa will play at Toa Payoh Stadium. Other stadiums used are: (1) Our Tampines Hub (Tampines Rovers and Geylang International), Hougang Stadium (Hougang United) and (3) Jurong East Stadium (Albirex Niigata and Tanjong Pagar United).
6. Teams will be equipped with Global Positioning Systems (GPS) devices - among other performance and tracking gear. Value of the sponsorship is worth around $620,000.
7. SPL teams are allowed to register a maximum of four foreign players with no age restrictions, of whom at least one shall be of the nationality of an AFC Member Association. A maximum of four foreign players may be named or fielded in any one match.
8. Players shall be allocated jersey numbers 1 to 50. Jersey number become available for allocation to new members after a player ceased to play.
1. Teams will be required to field only one U-23 player – instead of three – for the first half of a match from next season.
2. There will be no limit on the number of U-23 players registered in each squad.
3. SPL teams will play each other four times.
4. Teams will be able to register 20 players per match. There will be 9 substitutes allowed on a team's bench.
5. Each team will need to field a minimum of one under-23 player of Singaporean nationality for the entire duration of the first half.
6. Teams will receive monetary rewards for each of their U-23 players who get called up to the national teams.
7. 1st transfer window: 1 January 2021 to 20 March 2022
8. 2nd transfer window: 17 May 2021 to 13 June 2022

On 30 September 2022, the AFC had agreed to give its consent for Brunei DPMM's participation

== Teams ==
A total of 8 teams competed in the league. Albirex Niigata (S) from Japan is the only foreign team invited.

=== Stadiums and locations ===
Locations of the 2022 Singapore Premier League teams from Singapore

Team	Stadium	Capacity
Albirex Niigata (S)	Jurong East Stadium	2,700
Balestier Khalsa	Toa Payoh Stadium	3,800
Geylang International	Our Tampines Hub	5,000
Hougang United	Hougang Stadium	3,800
Lion City Sailors	Jalan Besar Stadium	6,000
Tampines Rovers	Our Tampines Hub	5,000
Tanjong Pagar United	Jurong East Stadium	2,700
Young Lions	Jalan Besar Stadium	6,000

=== Personnel and sponsors ===
Note: Flags indicate national team as has been defined under FIFA eligibility rules. Players may hold more than one non-FIFA nationality.

Team	Head coach	Captain	Kit manufacturer	Main shirt sponsor	Other shirt sponsors
Albirex Niigata (S)	(Japan) Kazuaki Yoshinaga	(Japan) Jun Kobayashi (Japan) Takahiro Koga (VC); Fairoz Hasan (VC)	(Japan) Mizuno	(Japan) Denka	Lensmode; Kubota; Reeracoen; Kirin; EnglishCentral; Gain City; Dpro Logistics Namics; One Asia Lawyers; JPLUS+ Daiho Group; JTB; NSG; Sanpoutei Ramen; SMBC; ACCEA Singapore; PR Times; Nippon Medical Care; HIT Singapore; With You Global Creations; SD Aircon; At Twenty; Salonpas; Crown Line; SETA Technologies; Salonpas; Soken Medical; Dr. Stretch
Balestier Khalsa	(Netherlands) Peter de Roo	(Japan) Shuhei Hoshino (C) (Singapore) Darren Teh (C) (Singapore) Ho Wai Loon (C)	(Germany) Adidas	(United States) Jeep	Weston Corporation; Project Vaults; PSB Academy; TopGrid Pest; Dr. Stretch; StarBalm
Geylang International	(Singapore) Mohd Noor Ali	(Singapore) Zaiful Nizam (Singapore) Abdil Qaiyyim Mutalib (VC)	(Thailand) FBT	(Japan) Epson	Aris Studio 23; Joydom Engineering; My Protein Singapore; Steel Industries; Springleaf Prata Place; Fightzone; TRUE Fitness; Dr. Stretch
Hougang United	(Singapore) Clement Teo	(Singapore) Fabian Kwok (Singapore) Lionel Tan (VC) (Singapore) Nazrul Nazari (VC) (Singapore) Ridhuan Barudin (VC)	(Thailand) Warrix	(Singapore) The Physio Circle	SportCenter by Zup; Cafe Football (CF); The Arena; SpeedFitness; Polar Water; StarBalm
Lion City Sailors	(Serbia) Luka Lalic (Interim)	(Singapore) Hariss Harun (Singapore) Amirul Adli (VC) (Singapore) Nur Adam Abdullah (VC)	(Germany) Puma	(Singapore) Sea	Shopee; Garena; Citrus by the pool WLJK; Good bites TAPS
Tampines Rovers	(Singapore) Gavin Lee	(Singapore) Yasir Hanapi (Singapore) Syazwan Buhari (VC) (Singapore) Irwan Shah (VC) (Japan) Kyoga Nakamura (VC)	(Japan) Mizuno	(Japan) ANA Courier Express	Rookbook; My Protein Singapore; Bauerfeind Sports; The Co-op; JSSL FC; Canadian 2 for 1 pizza StarBalm
Tanjong Pagar United	(Singapore) Hasrin Jailani	(Singapore) Faritz Abdul Hameed (Singapore) Daniel Bennett (VC)	(Thailand) FBT	(Japan) Tokyo Century	Samtrade Academy; Hyundai; StarBalm; The Rehab Lab
Young Lions	(Singapore) Nazri Nasir	(Singapore) Jacob Mahler (Singapore) Shah Shahiran (VC)	(United States) Nike		Catapult

=== Coaching changes ===
Team	Outgoing Head Coach	Manner of Departure	Date of Vacancy	Position in table	Incoming Head Coach	Date of appointment
Balestier Khalsa	(Croatia) Marko Kraljević	Contract Ended	10 October 2021	Pre-Season	(Singapore) Akbar Nawas	22 October 2021
Albirex Niigata (S)	(Japan) Keiji Shigetomi	Redesignated as Asst. Coach	26 October 2021	Pre-Season	(Japan) Kazuaki Yoshinaga	26 October 2021
Young Lions	(Singapore) Philippe Aw	End of caretaker role	31 December 2021	Pre-Season	(Singapore) Nazri Nasir	1 January 2022
Lion City Sailors	(South Korea) Kim Do-hoon	Left by Mutual Consent	11 August 2022	1st	(Serbia) Luka Lalic (interim)	11 August 2022
Balestier Khalsa	(Singapore) Akbar Nawas	Mutual Termination; Joining (Thailand) Udon Thani	18 August 2022	7th	(Netherlands) Peter de Roo (interim)	27 August 2022
Hougang United	(Singapore) Clement Teo	Stepped Down	20 November 2022	End of Season	(Singapore) Firdaus Kassim (interim)	

Note 1: Marko Kraljević was subsequently appointed as the Head, Youth for Hougang United.

== Foreign players ==
Singapore Premier League clubs can sign a maximum of four foreign players in the 2021 season, up from three as compared to 2019. However, one of them has to be 21 years old or younger on 1 January 2021 (Or at the age of registration).

Albirex Niigata can sign up unlimited number of Singaporean players for the new season. Only 2 local player above 23 years old is allowed.

Players name in bold indicates the player was registered after the season start or during the mid-season transfer window.

Club	Player 1	Player 2	Player 3	AFC Player	SG U-23 Player U-21 Player	Former Players
Albirex Niigata (S)	(Singapore) Hyrulnizam Juma'at	(Singapore) Fairoz Hassan	(Singapore) **Zamani Zamri**	(Singapore) Kai Yamamoto		
Albirex Niigata (S)	(Singapore) Nicky Singh	(Singapore) Junki Yoshimura	(Singapore) **Ilhan Fandi**	(Singapore) Wong Jun Kai		
Albirex Niigata (S)	(Singapore) Fikri Junaidi	(Singapore) Hilman Norhisam	(Singapore) Kenji Austin	(Singapore) Shakthi Vinayagavijayan		
Balestier Khalsa	(Serbia) Ensar Brunčević	(Japan) Shuhei Hoshino	(Japan) Ryoya Tanigushi	(Japan) Kuraba Kondo	(United States) (Scotland) Conor MacKay	(France) Yann Weishaupt (England) Max McCoy (England) Hari McCoy
Geylang International	(Croatia) Šime Žužul	(France) Vincent Bezecourt	(Japan) Takahiro Tezuka	(Japan) Rio Sakuma		
Hougang United	(Brazil) André Moritz	(Brazil) Pedro Bortoluzo	(Croatia) Kristijan Krajček	(Japan) Kaishu Yamazaki		
Lion City Sailors	(Brazil) Diego Lopes	(Brazil) Pedro Henrique	(Belgium) Maxime Lestienne	(South Korea) Kim Shin-wook		
Tampines Rovers	(Serbia) Zehrudin Mehmedović	(Montenegro) Boris Kopitović	(Japan) Kyoga Nakamura	(Japan) Shuya Yamashita		
Tanjong Pagar United	(Croatia) Mirko Šugić	(Australia) Blake Ricciuto	(Japan) Reo Nishiguchi	(Japan) Shodai Nishikawa		

Note 1: From 2021, Albirex is allowed to sign a maximum of 2 Singaporean players above the age of 23.

== Results ==
=== League table ===
Pos	Team	Pld	W	D	L	GF	GA	GD	Pts	Qualification or relegation
1	Albirex Niigata (S) (Note: The foreign club – Albirex Niigata (S) – as well as the Football Association of Singapore (FAS) under-21 team, Young Lions, are ineligible for any AFC competition spots.) (C)	28	17	8	3	88	43	+45	59	
2	Lion City Sailors (Q)	28	18	3	7	91	39	+52	57	Qualification for AFC Champions League Group stage
3	Tampines Rovers (Q)	28	15	5	8	76	57	+19	50	Standby team for AFC Cup group stage
4	Geylang International	28	10	9	9	48	46	+2	39	
5	Hougang United	28	10	9	9	65	71	−6	39	Qualification for AFC Cup group stage (Cup Winner)
6	Tanjong Pagar United	28	10	7	11	59	69	−10	37	
7	Balestier Khalsa	28	7	3	18	45	78	−33	24	
8	Young Lions	28	2	2	24	34	103	−69	8	

Source: Singapore Premier League
Rules for classification: 1) points; 2) goal difference; 3) number of goals scored; 4) number of wins
(C) Champions; (Q) Qualified for the phase indicated

=== Fixtures and results ===
Clubs play each other four times for 28 matches each.

==== Matches 1–14 ====
Home \ Away	ALB	BAL	GEY	HOU	LCS	TAM	TPU	YLI
Albirex Niigata (S)		6–0	8–2	5–0	1–1	3–2	0–2	7–1
Balestier Khalsa	1–2		0–2	2–1	1–6	2–2	3–5	4–3
Geylang International	2–2	0–1		0–0	1–0	2–3	1–0	2–2
Hougang United	1–1	3–1	3–2		3–4	4–2	1–1	2–1
Lion City Sailors	1–2	4–0	1–0	3–1		1–0	6–1	5–1
Tampines Rovers	3–3	2–1	2–0	7–1	0–4		3–3	3–2
Tanjong Pagar United	1–2	1–0	1–1	2–2	0–6	4–2		2–0
Young Lions	0–5	0–1	4–1	0–4	0–1	0–1	2–3	

Source: Flashscore
Legend: Blue = home team win; Yellow = draw; Red = away team win.
For upcoming matches, an "a" indicates there is an article about the rivalry between the two participants.

==== Matches 15–28 ====
Home \ Away	ALB	BAL	GEY	HOU	LCS	TAM	TPU	YLI
Albirex Niigata (S)		4–1	2–2	1–1	4–2	4–2	1–2	2–1
Balestier Khalsa	3–5		2–4	6–1	5–3	2–2	0–2	2–0
Geylang International	1–1	3–0		2–4	1–1	1–4	3–3	3–0
Hougang United	3–3	4–1	1–2		4–9	1–4	3–3	5–1
Lion City Sailors	2–4	4–0	1–3	1–1		2–1	7–0	2–1
Tampines Rovers	5–3	2–1	0–0	2–4	2–1		4–3	5–2
Tanjong Pagar United	1–2	3–1	0–5	2–2	1–3	3–4		8–1
Young Lions	0–5	4–4	0–2	3–5	1–10	0–7	4–2	

Source: Flashscore
Legend: Blue = home team win; Yellow = draw; Red = away team win.
For upcoming matches, an "a" indicates there is an article about the rivalry between the two participants.

== Statistics ==
=== Top scorers ===
As of 21 October 2022

Rank	Player	Club	Goals
1	(Montenegro) Boris Kopitović	Tampines Rovers	35
2	(Japan) Kodai Tanaka	Albirex Niigata (S)	33
3	(Japan) Reo Nishiguchi	Tanjong Pagar United	26
4	(South Korea) Kim Shin-wook	Lion City Sailors	21
5	(Japan) Shuhei Hoshino	Balestier Khalsa	18
5	(Croatia) Šime Žužul	Geylang International	18
5	(Brazil) Pedro Bortoluzo	Hougang United	18
6	(Singapore) Ilhan Fandi	Albirex Niigata (S) *15; Young Lions FC *2	17
7	(Singapore) Song Ui-young	Lion City Sailors	13
8	(Belgium) Maxime Lestienne	Lion City Sailors	12
8	(Singapore) Taufik Suparno	Tampines Rovers	12
9	(Singapore) Shawal Anuar	Hougang United	11
9	(Singapore) Gabriel Quak	Lion City Sailors	11
10	(Japan) Tadanari Lee	Albirex Niigata (S)	10
10	(Japan) Ryoya Tanigushi	Balestier Khalsa	10
10	(France) Vincent Bezecourt	Geylang International	10
10	(Brazil) Diego Lopes	Lion City Sailors	10

=== Hat-tricks ===
Player	For	Against	Result	Date
(Japan) Kodai Tanaka^{4}	Albirex Niigata (S)	Balestier Khalsa	6–0	5 March 2022
(Montenegro) Boris Kopitović	Tampines Rovers	Hougang United	7–1	18 March 2022
(South Korea) Kim Shin-wook	Lion City Sailors	Balestier Khalsa	4–0	1 April 2022
(South Korea) Kim Shin-wook	Lion City Sailors	Hougang United	4–3	6 May 2022
(Japan) Kodai Tanaka	Albirex Niigata (S)	Geylang International	8–2	27 May 2022
(Brazil) Pedro Bortoluzo	Hougang United	Tampines Rovers	4–3	13 July 2022
(Singapore) Ilhan Fandi	Albirex Niigata (S)	Balestier Khalsa	4–1	16 July 2022
(Singapore) Zikos Chua^{4}	Young Lions	Tanjong Pagar United	4–2	7 August 2022
(Japan) Kodai Tanaka	Albirex Niigata (S)	Young Lions	7–1	10 August 2022
(Japan) Shuhei Hoshino	Balestier Khalsa	Hougang United	6–1	12 August 2022
(South Korea) Kim Shin-wook	Lion City Sailors	Young Lions	10–1	13 August 2022
(South Korea) Kim Shin-wook	Lion City Sailors	Hougang United	9-4	26 August 2022
(Japan) Kodai Tanaka^{4}	Albirex Niigata (S)	Balestier Khalsa	5–3	2 September 2022
(Japan) Reo Nishiguchi^{5}	Tanjong Pagar United	Young Lions	8–1	1 October 2022
(Japan) Ryoya Tanigushi	Balestier Khalsa	Lion City Sailors	5–3	2 October 2022
(Japan) Kodai Tanaka	Albirex Niigata (S)	Lion City Sailors	4–2	7 October 2022
(Brazil) Pedro Bortoluzo	Hougang United	Young Lions	5–3	15 October 2022

Note ^{4} Player scored 4 goals ^{5} Player scored 5 goals

=== Top assists ===
As of 21 October 2022

Rank	Player	Club	Assists
1	(Belgium) Maxime Lestienne	Lion City Sailors	23
2	(Croatia) Kristijan Krajcek	Hougang United	17
3	(Japan) Masaya Idetsu	Albirex Niigata (S)	16
4	(Montenegro) Boris Kopitović	Tampines Rovers	15
5	(Japan) Ryoya Tanigushi	Balestier Khalsa	11
6	(Japan) Kodai Tanaka	Albirex Niigata (S)	10
6	(Brazil) Diego Lopes	Lion City Sailors	10

=== Clean sheets ===
As of 1 October 2022

Rank	Player	Club	Clean sheets
1	(Singapore) Zaiful Nizam	Geylang International	9
2	(Singapore) Hassan Sunny	Lion City Sailors	7
3	(Japan) Takahiro Koga	Albirex Niigata (S)	4
3	(Singapore) Zharfan Rohaizad	Tanjong Pagar United	4

=== Penalty missed ===
Player	For	Against	Date
(Singapore) Jacob Mahler	Young Lions	Albirex Niigata (S)	12 March 2022
(Japan) Kuraba Kondo	Balestier Khalsa	Lion City Sailors	6 August 2022
(Japan) Ryoya Taniguchi	Balestier Khalsa	Lion City Sailors	2 September 2022
(Japan) Shuhei Hoshino	Balestier Khalsa	Lion City Sailors	2 October 2022
(Montenegro) Boris Kopitović	Tampines Rovers	Hougang United	8 October 2022

=== Own goal ===
Player	For	Against	Date
(Singapore) Abdil Qaiyyim Mutalib	Geylang International	Albirex Niigata (S)	12 March 2022
(Singapore) Faritz Abdul Hameed	Tanjong Pagar United	Tampines Rovers	6 April 2022
(Brazil) Pedro Henrique	Lion City Sailors	Tanjong Pagar United	9 April 2022
(Singapore) Qayyum Raishyan	Geylang International	Young Lions	16 April 2022
(Singapore) Ryaan Sanizal	Tampines Rovers	Lion City Sailors	21 May 2022
(Singapore) Syahrul Sazali	Young Lions	Albirex Niigata (S)	23 July 2022
(Singapore) Harhys Stewart	Young Lions	Albirex Niigata (S)	10 August 2022
(Japan) Reo Kunimoto	Albirex Niigata (S)	Young Lions	10 August 2022
(Singapore) Shakir Hamzah	Tanjong Pagar United	Geylang International	9 October 2022
(Singapore) Ryaan Sanizal	Tampines Rovers	Albirex Niigata (S)	15 October 2022

=== Yellow Cards (Team) ===
As of 27 October 2022

Rank	Club	Yellow Cards
1	Tanjong Pagar United	66
2	Tampines Rovers	62
3	Hougang United	61
4	Balestier Khalsa	52
5	Lion City Sailors	46

=== Yellow Cards (Players) ===
As of 27 October 2022

Rank	Players	Club	Yellow Cards
1	Yasir Hanapi	Tampines Rovers	9
1	Raihan Rahman	Tanjong Pagar United	9
2	Rusyaidi Salime	Tanjong Pagar United	7
2	Blake Ricciuto	Tanjong Pagar United	7
2	Jared Gallagher	Young Lions FC	7

=== Red Cards (Team) ===
As of 27 October 2022

Rank	Club	Red Cards
1	Geylang International	5
2	Hougang United	3
3	Lion City Sailors	2
3	Tanjong Pagar United	2

== Awards ==
=== Monthly awards ===
Month	Player of the Month		Young Player of the Month		Coach of the Month		Goal of the Month	Ref
Month	Player	Club	Player	Club	Coach	Club	Player vs.	Ref
March	(Croatia) Mirko Šugić	Tanjong Pagar United	(Japan) Kodai Tanaka	Albirex Niigata (S)	(Singapore) Hasrin Jailani	Tanjong Pagar United	(Brazil) André Moritz vs. Geylang International (11/3/2022)	
April	(Montenegro) Boris Kopitović	Tampines Rovers	(Singapore) Ryhan Stewart	Young Lions	(South Korea) Kim Do-hoon	Lion City Sailors	(Croatia) Sime Zuzul vs. Albirex Niigata (S) (5/4/2022)	
May	(Belgium) Maxime Lestienne	Lion City Sailors	(Japan) Kodai Tanaka	Albirex Niigata (S)	(Japan) Kazuaki Yoshinaga	Albirex Niigata (S)	(Japan) Reo Nishiguchi vs. Albirex Niigata (S) (7/5/2022)	
July	(Japan) Kodai Tanaka	Albirex Niigata (S)	(Singapore) Ilhan Fandi	Albirex Niigata (S)	(Singapore) Noor Ali	Geylang International	(Singapore) Ilhan Fandi vs. Balestier Khalsa (16 July 2022)	
August	(Belgium) Maxime Lestienne	Lion City Sailors	(Singapore) Ilhan Fandi	Albirex Niigata (S)	(Serbia) Luka Lalić	Lion City Sailors	(Japan) Kyoga Nakamura vs. Geylang International (3/8/2022)	

== Singapore Premier League Awards night winners ==
Awards	Winners	Club	Ref
Player of the Year	(Japan) Kodai Tanaka	Albirex Niigata (S)	
Young Player of the Year	(Singapore) Ilhan Fandi	Albirex Niigata (S)	
Coach of the Year	(Japan) Kazuaki Yoshinaga	Albirex Niigata (S)	
Top Scorer Award	(Montenegro) Boris Kopitović	Tampines Rovers	
Golden Glove	(Singapore) Zaiful Nizam	Geylang International	
Goal of the Year	(Singapore) Ilhan Fandi vs. Balestier Khalsa (16 July 2022)	Albirex Niigata (S)	
Fair Play Award	Albirex Niigata (S)		
Referee of the Year	Ahmad Aqasha		

AIA Team of the Year
Goalkeeper	(Singapore) Zaiful Nizam (Geylang International)			
Defence	(Japan) Masaya Idetsu (Albirex Niigata (S))		(Brazil) Pedro Henrique (Lion City Sailors)	(Singapore) Joshua Pereira (Geylang International)
Midfield	(Japan) Kyoga Nakamura (Tampines Rovers)	(France) Vincent Bezecourt (Geylang International)	(Brazil) Diego Lopes (Lion City Sailors)	(Belgium) Maxime Lestienne (Lion City Sailors)
Attack	(Japan) Kodai Tanaka (Albirex Niigata (S))		(Singapore) Ilhan Fandi (Albirex Niigata (S))	(Montenegro) Boris Kopitović (Tampines Rovers)

== Attendances ==
The best-attended games:

#	Match	Date	Attendance
1	Lion City Sailors vs Albirex Niigata Singapore	7 October 2022	3,389
2	Lion City Sailors vs Albirex Niigata Singapore	24 June 2022	2,443
3	Albirex Niigata Singapore vs Lion City Sailors	29 July 2022	2,084
4	Tampines Rovers vs Lion City Sailors	10 September 2022	1,934
5	Albirex Niigata Singapore vs Hougang United	19 June 2022	1,891
