= 2022 Albirex Niigata Singapore FC season =

Albirex Niigata (S)
2022 season
- Chairman: Daisuke Korenaga
- Head coach: (Japan) Kazuaki Yoshinaga
- Stadium: Jurong East Stadium
- Premier League: 1st
- Singapore Cup: 3rd
- Charity Shield: 2nd

The 2022 season was Albirex Niigata Singapore FC's 19th consecutive season in the top flight of Singapore football and in the Singapore Premier League, having joined the league in 2004. Along with the 2022 Singapore Premier League, the club also competed in the Singapore Cup and the Singapore League Cup.

The female team played in the Women's Premier League (Singapore).

== Squad ==
=== SPL Squad ===
As of 5 February 2022

Squad No.	Name	Nationality	Date of birth (age)	Previous club	Contract start	Contract end
Goalkeepers
21	Hyrulnizam Juma'at ^{>23}	(Singapore)	14 November 1986 (age 40)	(Singapore) Warriors FC	2019	2022
31	Takahiro Koga	(Japan)	11 March 1999 (age 27)	(Japan) V-Varen Nagasaki	2021	2022
Defenders
2	Tatsuya Sambongi	(Japan)	28 July 1999 (age 27)	(Japan) Kanagawa University	2022	2022
3	Keito Hariya	(Japan)	18 May 2003 (age 23)	(Japan) Funabashi Municipal HS	2022	2022
4	Jun Kobayashi	(Japan)	7 May 1999 (age 27)	(Japan) Kwansei Gakuin University	2022	2022
5	Daichi Omori	(Japan)	1 April 2000 (age 26)	(Japan) Toyo University	2022	2022
14	Reo Kunimoto	(Japan)	1 September 2001 (age 25)	(Japan) Renofa Yamaguchi FC (J2)	2021	2022
16	Shogo Toyomura	(Japan)	6 November 1999 (age 27)	(Japan) Chuo Gakuin University	2022	2022
25	Yoshiki Matsuura	(Japan)	5 April 2001 (age 25)	Japan Soccer College	2022	2022
Midfielders
6	Kumpei Kakuta	(Japan)	8 May 1999 (age 27)	(Japan) Kanagawa University	2022	2022
7	Masahiro Sugita	(Japan)	24 November 1999 (age 26)	(Japan) Waseda University	2022	2022
8	Masaya Idetsu	(Japan)	11 May 1999 (age 27)	(Japan) Osaka Sangyo University	2022	2022
10	Kan Kobayashi	(Japan)	27 April 1999 (age 27)	(Japan) Tsukuba University	2022	2022
13	Mahiro Takahashi	(Japan)	26 June 2001 (age 25)	(Japan) Albirex Niigata U18	2020	2022
15	Tsubasa Kawanishi	(Japan)	12 June 2002 (age 24)	(Japan) Kyushu International University HS	2021	2022
23	Hilman Norhisam	(Singapore)	5 May 2004 (age 22)	Singapore Sports School	2021	2022
26	Kanato Fukazawa	(Japan)	4 December 2001 (age 24)	Japan Soccer College	2022	2022
Strikers
9	Fikri Junaidi	(Singapore)	2 April 2000 (age 26)	(Singapore) Young Lions FC	2021	2022
11	Kodai Tanaka	(Japan)	23 December 1999 (age 26)	(Japan) Takushoku University	2022	2022
17	Ilhan Fandi	(Singapore) (South Africa)	8 November 2002 (age 24)	(Singapore) Young Lions FC	2022	2022
18	Nicky Melvin Singh	(Singapore) (Philippines)	13 June 2002 (age 24)	(Singapore) Tampines Rovers U19	2021	2022
19	Tadanari Lee ^{>23}	(Japan)	19 December 1985 (age 40)	(Japan) Kyoto Sanga	2022	2022
20	Fairoz Hassan ^{>23}	(Singapore)	26 November 1988 (age 37)	(Singapore) Tiong Bahru FC (NFL)	2020	2022
22	Shota Ochiai	(Japan)	23 June 2002 (age 24)	Japan Soccer College	2022	2022
24	Zamani Zamri	(Singapore)	31 May 2001 (age 25)	(Singapore) Young Lions FC	2022	2022
27	Satsuki Mori	(Japan)	29 November 2001 (age 24)	(United States) Hinds Community College	2022	2022
Players who left club during season

=== Women Squad ===
As of 5 February 2022

Squad No.	Name	Nationality	Date of birth (age)	Previous club	Contract start	Contract end
Goalkeepers
1	Nurul Radiatul	(Singapore)	18 March 2001 (age 25)	(Singapore) Tampines Changkat CSC	2022	2022
25	Maisarah Ramat	(Singapore)	16 October 1993 (age 33)	(Singapore)	2022	2022
96	Lynse Ann Sng	(Singapore)			2022	2022
Defenders
3	Kana Kitahara	(Japan)	7 December 1988 (age 37)	(Japan) MyNavi Sendai	2022	2022
5	Cynthia Taye Shi Ya	(Singapore)	17 February 1984 (age 42)	(Singapore)	2022	2022
6	Nur Shaahidah	(Singapore)	31 May 1999 (age 27)	(Singapore) Arion Women's FC	2022	2022
10	Irsalina Irwan	(Singapore)	1 January 2007 (age 19)	(Singapore)	2022	2022
15	Dini Danisha	(Singapore)	6 April 2003 (age 23)	(Singapore)	2022	2022
17	Nur Emilia Natasha	(Singapore)	15 January 1999 (age 27)	(Singapore) Police SA	2022	2022
18	Wee Xin Yi	(Singapore)	1 February 2000 (age 26)	(Singapore)	2022	2022
23	Marilou Bautista Rubio	(Philippines)	28 September 1975 (age 51)	(Philippines) Far Eastern University	2022	2022
Midfielders
4	Noridah Abdullah	(Singapore)	20 December 1986 (age 39)	(Singapore)	2022	2022
8	Noralinda Wahab	(Singapore)	8 March 1994 (age 32)	(Singapore) Kaki Bukit SC	2022	2022
9	Nadhra Aqilah	(Singapore)	12 April 1994 (age 32)	(Singapore) Tanjong Pagar United Women	2022	2022
12	Chloe Poh Yee Fang	(Singapore)	9 March 1995 (age 31)	(Singapore)	2022	2022
14	Suriati Soony	(Singapore)	26 June 1993 (age 33)	(Singapore) Kaki Bukit SC	2022	2022
16	Nadya Zah	(Singapore)	31 December 1985 (age 40)	(Singapore)	2022	2022
19	Nur Maisarah	(Singapore)	10 November 1998 (age 28)	(Singapore) Home United Women	2022	2022
20	Nurul Unaisah	(Singapore)	12 July 2003 (age 23)	(Singapore)	2022	2022
21	Amirah Syahirah	(Singapore)	28 July 1997 (age 29)	(Singapore) Kaki Bukit SC	2022	2022
22	Siti Nor Aqilah	(Singapore)	17 October 2001 (age 25)	(Singapore) Tampines Changkat CSC	2022	2022
24	Nur Sarah Zu'risqha	(Singapore)	24 July 2006 (age 20)	(Singapore)	2022	2022
30	Wan Nashirah	(Singapore)	4 August 2005 (age 21)	(Singapore)	2022	2022
73	Siti Erma Ellyana	(Singapore)	20 June 1989 (age 37)	(Singapore)	2022	2022
97	Lauren Reese	(Wales)	3 May 1997 (age 29)	(Wales) Wrexham AFC Women	2022	2022
Strikers
2	Nurhidayah Shah	(Singapore)	16 April 1991 (age 35)	(Singapore)	2022	2022
7	Huraizah Ismail	(Singapore)	2 June 1984 (age 42)	(Singapore) Police SA	2022	2022
11	Tina Afrida Nasmi	(Singapore)	5 April 1982 (age 44)	(Singapore)	2022	2022
13	Nuur Fitri Ardilla	(Singapore)	3 February 1999 (age 27)	(Singapore) Lion City Sailors Women	2022	2022
Players who left club during season
15	Nur Danisyah	(Singapore)	17 May 1999 (age 27)	(Singapore)	2022	2022

== Coaching staff ==
Position	Name
Technical Director	(Japan) Kazuaki Yoshinaga
Head Coach (Men)	(Japan) Kazuaki Yoshinaga
Head Coach (Women)	(Singapore) Nahar Daud
Assistant Coach	(Japan) Keiji Shigetomi
Sports Trainer	(Japan) Tomoya Ueta
U15 Coach	(Japan) Masayuki Kato
Goalkeeper Coach	(Singapore) Hyrulnizam Juma'at (Singapore) Fadhil Salim
Fitness Coach & U19 Coach	(Singapore) Jaswinder Singh
Team Manager	(Singapore) Dominic Wong
Physiotherapist	(Singapore) Karen Koh (Singapore) Alison Soh
Kitman	(Singapore) Roy Krishnan
Interpreter	(Japan) Ayumi Nagami

== Transfer ==
=== In ===
Preseason

Position	Player	Transferred from	Ref
DF	(Japan) Jun Kobayashi	(Japan) Kwansei Gakuin University	Free
DF	(Japan) Daichi Omori	(Japan) Toyo University	Free
DF	(Japan) Keito Hariya	(Japan) Funabashi Municipal HS	Free
DF	(Japan) Tatsuya Sambongi	(Japan) Kanagawa University	Free
DF	(Japan) Yoshiki Matsuura	Japan Soccer College	Free
DF	(Japan) Shogo Toyomura	(Japan) Chuo Gakuin University	Free
MF	(Japan) Kanato Fukazawa	Japan Soccer College	Free
MF	(Japan) Masahiro Sugita	(Japan) Waseda University	Free
MF	(Japan) Kan Kobayashi	(Japan) Tsukuba University	Free
MF	(Japan) Masaya Idetsu	(Japan) Osaka Sangyo University	Free
MF	(Japan) Kumpei Kakuta	(Japan) Kanagawa University	Free
FW	(Japan) Tadanari Lee	(Japan) Kyoto Sanga	Free
FW	(Japan) Kodai Tanaka	(Japan) Takushoku University	Free
FW	(Japan) Shota Ochiai	Japan Soccer College	Free
FW	(Japan) Satsuki Mori	(United States) Hinds Community College	Free
FW	(Singapore) Ilhan Fandi	(Singapore) Young Lions FC	Free

Note 1: Ilhan Fandi signs for the club and join after completing his NS stint in April 2022.

=== Loan In ===
Preseason

Position	Player	Transferred from	Ref
DF	(Japan) Reo Kunimoto	(Japan) Renofa Yamaguchi FC (J2)	Season Loan

=== Loan Return ===
Preseason

Position	Player	Transferred To / From	Ref
DF	(Japan) Reo Kunimoto	(Japan) Renofa Yamaguchi FC (J2)	Loan Return
FW	(Japan) Kiyoshiro Tsuboi	(Japan) Tokushima Vortis (J1)	Loan Return
FW	(Singapore) Zamani Zamri	(Singapore) Young Lions FC	End of NS

Note 1: Reo returned to the club on loan after successful negotiation for another season.

Note 2: Zamani Zamri returns to the club after completing his NS stint in April 2022.

=== Out ===
Preseason

Position	Player	Transferred To	Ref
GK	(Singapore) Sunny Tia Yang Guang	(Singapore) Tampines Rovers	Free
DF	(Japan) Takahiro Tezuka	(Singapore) Geylang International	Free
DF	(Japan) Yu Tokiwa	(Japan) Toho Titanium (J5)	Free
DF	(Japan) Shuya Yamashita	(Singapore) Tampines Rovers	Free
DF	(Japan) Kazuki Hashioka	(Japan) Aries FC Tokyo (J6)	Free
DF	(Japan) Yasuhiro Hanada	(Lithuania) DFK Dainava (L2)	Free
DF	(Japan) Kohga Tsuruhara	(Croatia) NK Križevci (C3)	Free
MF	(Japan) Ryoya Tanigushi	(Singapore) Balestier Khalsa	Free
MF	(Japan) Kosuke Chiku	(Japan) Gainare Tottori (J3)	Free
MF	(Japan) Makoto Ito	(Japan)	
MF	(Singapore) Ong Yu En	(Singapore) Tampines Rovers	Free
FW	(Japan) Ryosuke Nagasawa	(Serbia) FK Radnički Niš (S1)	Free
FW	(Japan) (England) Morrison Hashii	(Japan)	
FW	(Japan) Kuraba Kondo	(Singapore) Balestier Khalsa	Free
FW	(Japan) Fumiya Suzuki	(Japan)	
FW	(Singapore) Ali Manaf	(Japan) Tampines Rovers U21	Free

=== Loan Out ===
Position	Player	Transferred To	Ref
MF	(Singapore) Zamani Zamri	(Singapore) SAFSA	NS till April 2022
MF	(Singapore) Daniel Goh	(Singapore) SAFSA	NS till 2022

=== Retained / Extension / Promoted ===
Position	Player	Ref
GK	(Singapore) Hyrulnizam Juma'at	1 year contract till 2022
GK	(Japan) Takahiro Koga	1 year contract till 2022
MF	(Japan) Tsubasa Kawanishi	1 year contract till 2022
MF	(Singapore) Hilman Norhisam	1 year contract till 2022
MF	(Singapore) (Philippines) Nicky Melvin Singh	2 years season loan from Tampines Rovers till 2022
MF	(Japan) Mahiro Takahashi	1 year contract till 2022
FW	(Singapore) Fairoz Hassan	1 year contract till 2022
FW	(Singapore) Fikri Junaidi	1 year contract till 2022

=== Rumours ===
Pre-Season

Position	Player	Transferred To	Ref
MF	(Japan) Kanta Suzuki	(Japan) Fujieda City Hall SC	Free
FW	(Japan) Kakeru Kubota	(Japan) Tsukuba University	Free
MF	(Japan) Yuto Shimizu	(Japan) Yokohama FC U18	Free

== Friendly ==
=== Pre-season friendlies ===
Win Draw Loss

5 February 2022 1	Albirex Niigata (S) (Japan)	7–0 (Note: The game was played as three periods of 45 minutes)	(Singapore) Balestier Khalsa	Jurong East, Singapore
17:30 SST	K. Kobayashi 7'; Lee 24'; Sugita 29', 51'; Matsuura 75'; Omori 88'; Ochiai 117'	Report		Stadium: Jurong East Stadium

12 February 2022 2	Tampines Rovers (Singapore)	0–0	(Japan) Albirex Niigata (S)	Jalan Besar
		Report		Stadium: Jalan Besar Stadium

=== In Season friendlies ===
28 March 2022 1	Albirex Niigata(S) (Japan)	0–3	Malaysia	Jalan Besar, Singapore
			Krasniqi 9'; Sumareh 45'; Halim 65'	Stadium: Jalan Besar Stadium

30 April 2022 2	Albirex Niigata(S) (Japan)	v	Singapore u23	Singapore
				Stadium: Jalan Besar Stadium

21 May 2022 3	Albirex Niigata(S) (Japan)	v	Singapore Khalsa SA	Jurong West, Singapore
				Stadium: Jurong West Stadium

24 September 2022 4	Albirex Niigata(S) (Japan)	3–0	Singapore u21	Singapore
	Tadanari Lee; Kanato Fukazawa			Stadium: Jalan Besar Stadium

== Team statistics ==
=== Appearances and goals ===
As at 18 Nov 2022

No.	Pos.	Player	SPL		Singapore Cup		Charity Shield		Total	
No.	Pos.	Player	Apps.	Goals	Apps.	Goals	Apps.	Goals	Apps.	Goals
2	DF	(Japan) Tatsuya Sambongi	7+6	1	2+1	0	1	0	17	1
3	DF	(Japan) Keito Hariya	25+2	0	6	0	1	0	34	0
4	DF	(Japan) Jun Kobayashi	27	4	5	0	1	0	33	4
5	DF	(Japan) Daichi Omori	24	0	3	0	1	0	28	0
6	MF	(Japan) Kumpei Kakuta	28	2	6	0	1	0	35	2
7	MF	(Japan) Masahiro Sugita	27	8	5	1	1	0	33	9
8	MF	(Japan) Masaya Idetsu	23	5	5	2	1	0	29	7
9	FW	(Singapore) Fikri Junaidi	0	0	0	0	0	0	0	0
10	MF	(Japan) Kan Kobayashi	25+1	4	6	1	1	0	33	5
11	FW	(Japan) Kodai Tanaka	27+1	33	4	6	0	0	32	39
13	MF	(Japan) Mahiro Takahashi	2+9	0	1+1	0	0	0	13	0
14	DF	(Japan) Reo Kunimoto	13+4	0	2+1	1	0	0	20	1
15	MF	(Japan) Tsubasa Kawanishi	0+4	0	0	0	0	0	4	0
16	DF	(Japan) Shogo Toyomura	0+1	0	3+1	0	0	0	5	0
17	FW	(Singapore) Ilhan Fandi	16+2	15	5+1	3	0	0	24	18
18	FW	(Singapore) Nicky Melvin Singh	7+7	0	3+3	0	0	0	20	0
19	FW	(Japan) Tadanari Lee	16+6	10	2+4	1	1	1	29	12
20	FW	(Singapore) Fairoz Hassan	1+7	1	0	0	0+1	0	9	1
21	GK	(Singapore) Hyrulnizam Juma'at	1	0	0	0	0	0	1	0
22	FW	(Japan) Shota Ochiai	0+1	0	0	0	0+1	0	2	0
23	MF	(Singapore) Hilman Norhisam	1	0	0	0	1	0	2	0
24	FW	(Singapore) Zamani Zamri	8+2	1	0+2	0	0	0	12	1
25	DF	(Japan) Yoshiki Matsuura	2+1	0	0	0	0+1	0	4	0
26	MF	(Japan) Kanato Fukazawa	1+21	0	2+4	0	0	0	27	0
27	FW	(Japan) Satsuki Mori	0+1	0	0+2	0	0	0	3	0
31	GK	(Japan) Takahiro Koga	27	0	6	0	1	0	34	0
51	GK	(Japan) (United States) Kai Yamamoto	0	0	0	0	0	0	0	0
52	DF	(Singapore) (Japan) Junki Kenn Yoshimura	0+1	0	0+1	0	0	0	2	0
53	MF	(Singapore) Wong Jun Kai	0	0	0	0	0	0	0	0
54	MF	(Singapore) (Japan) Kenji Austin	0	0	0	0	0	0	0	0
55	FW	(Singapore) Shakthi Vinayagavijayan	0+1	0	0	0	0	0	1	0
Players who have played this season but had left the club or on loan to other club

=== Appearances and goals (Women) ===
As of 10 Sept 2022

No.	Pos.	Player	WPL		Total	
No.	Pos.	Player	Apps.	Goals	Apps.	Goals
1	GK	(Singapore) Nurul Radiatul Ain	2+2	0	4	0
2	FW	(Singapore) Nurhidayah Shah	3+7	2	10	2
3	DF	(Japan) Kana Kitahara	4	4	4	4
4	MF	(Singapore) Noridah Abdullah	5+1	0	6	0
5	DF	(Singapore) Cynthia Taye Shi Ya	5+2	0	7	0
6	DF	(Singapore) Nur Shaahidah	10+1	0	11	0
7	MF	(Singapore) Huraizah Ismail	9	5	9	5
8	FW	(Singapore) Noralinda Wahab	4+6	5	10	5
9	FW	(Singapore) Nadhra Aqilah	5	3	5	3
10	DF	(Singapore) Irsalina Irwan	11	1	11	1
11	MF	(Singapore) Tina Afrida Nasmi	10+2	3	12	3
13	MF	(Singapore) Nuur Fitri Ardilla	0+4	0	4	0
14	MF	(Singapore) Suriati Soony	7+4	0	11	0
15	MF	(Singapore) Dini Dannisha	4+1	0	5	0
16	MF	(Singapore) Nadya Zah	2+2	0	4	0
17	DF	(Singapore) Nur Emilia Natasha	7	1	7	1
18	DF	(Singapore) Wee Xin Yi	6	0	6	0
19	MF	(Singapore) Nur Maisarah	0+2	0	2	0
20	DF	(Singapore) Nurul Unaisah	1+6	0	7	0
21	MF	(Singapore) Amirah Syahirah	1+3	1	4	1
22	MF	(Singapore) Siti Nor Aqilah	8+2	3	10	3
23	DF	(Philippines) Marilou Bautista Rubio	4+2	0	1	0
24	MF	(Singapore) Nur Sarah Zu'risqha	6+1	1	7	1
25	GK	(Singapore) Maisarah Ramat	10	0	10	0
30	MF	(Singapore) Wan Nashirah	0+1	1	1	1
73	MF	(Singapore) Siti Erma Ellyana	5+1	0	6	0
96	GK	(Singapore) Lynse Ann Sng	0+1	1	1	1
97	MF	(England) Lauren Reese	2+4	0	6	0
Players who have played this season but had left the club or on loan to other club

== Competitions ==
=== Charity Shield ===
19 February 2022 Charity Shield	Lion City Sailors (Singapore)	2–1	(Japan) Albirex Niigata (S)	Jalan Besar
	Kim 40' 87' (yellow card) 75'	Report	Lee 13' (pen.); Sambongi (yellow card) 55'	Stadium: Jalan Besar Stadium; Attendance: 1,000; Referee: Jansen Foo

=== Singapore Premier League ===
Win Draw Loss

25 February 2022 1	Albirex Niigata (S) (Japan)	0–2	(Singapore) Tanjong Pagar United	Jurong East
	Tanaka (yellow card) 48'; Kakuta (yellow card) 81'	Report	Nishiguchi 1' 10'; Abdullah (yellow card) 58'; Rahman (yellow card) 61'	Stadium: Jurong East Stadium; Attendance: 728; Referee: Taufik Thana

5 March 2022 2	Albirex Niigata (S) (Japan)	6–0	(Singapore) Balestier Khalsa	Jurong East
	Tanaka 33' 54' 60' 68'; Lee 57'; J. Kobayashi 67'; Sugita (yellow card) 61'	Report		Stadium: Jurong East Stadium; Referee: Hilmi Fuad

12 March 2022 3	Young Lions FC (Singapore)	0–5	(Japan) Albirex Niigata (S)	Jalan Besar
	Mahler (penalty missed) 54; Chew (yellow card) 17'; Zulqarnaen (yellow card) 37'	Report	Tanaka 34' 36'; Sugita 82'; Fairoz 87'; K. Kobayashi 90+2' (pen.); Singh (yellow card) 44'; Sambongi (yellow card) 52'	Stadium: Jalan Besar Stadium; Referee: Ahmad A'qashah

18 March 2022 4	Albirex Niigata (S) (Japan)	1–1	(Singapore) Lion City Sailors	Jurong East
	Omori 45'; K. Kobayashi (yellow card) 76'; Sambongi (yellow card) 90'	Report	Quak 90+1' (pen.); Swandi (yellow card) 49'; Hafiz (yellow card) 90+2'	Stadium: Jurong East Stadium; Referee: Muhammad Taqi

1 April 2022 5	Hougang United (Singapore)	1–1	(Japan) Albirex Niigata (S)	Hougang
	Sahil 77'; Farhan (yellow card) 25'; Nazhiim (yellow card) 73'	Report	Sugita 44'; Matsuura (yellow card) 90+3'	Stadium: Hougang Stadium; Referee: Taufik Thana

5 April 2022 6	Geylang International (Singapore)	2–2	(Japan) Albirex Niigata (S)	Tampines
	Žužul 30'; Hazzuwan 44'; Abdil Qaiyyim (yellow card) 38'; Faizal (red card) 60'	Report	Abdil Qaiyyim 6' (o.g.); Sugita 35'; Singh (yellow card) 61'	Stadium: Our Tampines Hub; Referee: Hilmi Fuad

9 April 2022 7	Tampines Rovers (Singapore)	3–3	(Japan) Albirex Niigata (S)	Tampines
	Kopitović 31' (pen.) 35'; Firdaus 45'; Hanapi (yellow card) 89'	Report	Tanaka 8'; J. Kobayashi 13'; Lee 67'; K. Kobayashi (yellow card) 81'	Stadium: Our Tampines Hub; Referee: Ahmad A'qashah

7 May 2022 8	Tanjong Pagar United (Singapore)	1–2	(Japan) Albirex Niigata (S)	Jurong East
	Nishiguchi 22'; Raihan (yellow card) 45'; Ricciuto (yellow card) 48'; Aqhari (yellow card) 80'	Report	Tanaka 33'; Idetsu 45+2'; K. Kobayashi (yellow card) 90'	Stadium: Jurong East Stadium; Referee: Jansen Foo

13 May 2022 9	Balestier Khalsa (Singapore)	1–2	(Singapore) Albirex Niigata (S)	Toa Payoh
	Hoshino 49'; Ho (yellow card) 9'; Low (yellow card) 10'; Puvan Raj (yellow card) 22'	Report	J. Kobayashi 10'; Lee 86'; Kunimoto (yellow card) 32'	Stadium: Toa Payoh Stadium; Referee: Ahmad A'qashah

27 May 2022 10	Albirex Niigata (S) (Japan)	8–2	(Singapore) Geylang International	Jurong East
	Tanaka 11' 40' 71'; Zamani 44'; Sugita 65'; K. Kobayashi 70' 80'; Ilhan 85'; Idetsu (yellow card) 90'	Report	Abdil Qaiyyim 28'; Žužul 49'; Huzaifah (yellow card) 31'; Ahmad (yellow card) 86'	Stadium: Jurong East Stadium; Referee: Taufik Thana; Man of the Match: (Singapore) Ilhan Fandi

10 August 2022 11 (Rescheduled)	Albirex Niigata (S) (Japan)	7–1	(Singapore) Young Lions FC	Jurong East
	Kodai Tanaka 21' 31' 65'; Masahiro Sugita 23'; Ilhan Fandi 34'; Harhys Stewart 59' (o.g.); Kumpei Kakuta 88' (yellow card) 57'	Report	Reo Kunimoto 90+1' (o.g.); Shah Shahiran (yellow card) 55'; Jared Gallagher (yellow card) 83'; Amir Syafiz (yellow card) 83'	Stadium: Jurong East Stadium; Referee: Abirami Naidu

19 June 2022 12	Albirex Niigata (S) (Japan)	5–0	(Singapore) Hougang United	Jurong East
	Tadanari Lee 2'; Tanaka 19' (pen.); Ilhan Fandi 53'; Masahiro Sugita 56'; Masaya Idetsu 65'	Report	Nazrul Nazari (yellow card) 18' (yellow-red card) 90+1'	Stadium: Jurong East Stadium; Referee: Ahmad A'qashah

24 June 2022 13	Lion City Sailors (Singapore)	1–2	(Japan) Albirex Niigata (S)	Jalan Besar
	Kim Shin-wook 42'; Anumanthan Kumar (yellow card) 33'; Nur Adam Abdullah (yellow card) 60'	Report	Masaya Idetsu 45+1'; Tanaka 54'; Zamani Zamri (yellow card) 32'	Stadium: Jalan Besar Stadium; Attendance: 1,821; Referee: Jansen Foo

4 July 2022 14 (Rescheduled)	Albirex Niigata (S) (Japan)	3–2	(Singapore) Tampines Rovers	Jurong East
	Kodai Tanaka 14'; Ilhan Fandi 60'; Jun Kobayashi 68'	Report	Boris Kopitović 61' 85' (pen.)	Stadium: Jurong East Stadium; Referee: Muhammad Taqi

8 July 2022 15	Albirex Niigata (S) (Japan)	1–2	(Singapore) Tanjong Pagar United	Jurong East
	Ilhan Fandi 8'; Keito Hariya (yellow card) 78'; Yoshiki Matsuura (yellow card) 90'	Report	Reo Nishiguchi 90' (yellow card) 42'; Khairul Nizam 90+2'; Emmeric Ong (yellow card) 44'; Fathullah Rahmat (yellow card) 54'	Stadium: Jurong East Stadium; Referee: Abirami Naidu

16 July 2022 16	Albirex Niigata (S) (Japan)	4–1	(Singapore) Balestier Khalsa	Jurong East
	Ilhan Fandi 11' 22' 62'; Kodai Tanaka 13'	Report	Shuhei Hoshino 41'	Stadium: Jurong East Stadium; Referee: Shadiq Al-Hussain

23 July 2022 17	Young Lions FC (Singapore)	0–5	(Japan) Albirex Niigata (S)	Jalan Besar
	Jared Gallagher (yellow card) 34'; Nor Hakim Redzuan (yellow card) 44'; Arshad Shamim (yellow card) 34'	Report	Ilhan Fandi 24'; Masahiro Sugita 29'; Kodai Tanaka 64' 73'; Syahrul Sazali 85' (o.g.); Kumpei Kakuta (yellow card) 37'; Zamani Zamri (yellow card) 41'; Keito Hariya (yellow card) 42'; Tsubasa Kawanishi (yellow card) 67'; Reo Kunimoto (yellow card) 74'; Masaya Idetsu (yellow card) 84'	Stadium: Jalan Besar Stadium; Referee: Farhad Mohamed

29 July 2022 18	Albirex Niigata (S) (Japan)	4–2	(Singapore) Lion City Sailors	Jurong East
	Kodai Tanaka 23' 38'; Kan Kobayashi 58'; Tadanari Lee 84'; Daichi Omori (yellow card) 11'	Report	Anumanthan Kumar 21'; Kim Shin-wook 74'; Hariss Harun (yellow card) 59'; Nur Adam Abdullah (yellow card) 62'; Saifullah Akbar (yellow card) 74'; Gabriel Quak (yellow card) 90+4'	Stadium: Jurong East Stadium; Referee: Taufik Thana

5 August 2022 19	Hougang United (Singapore)	3–3	(Japan) Albirex Niigata (S)	Hougang
	Pedro Bortoluzo 61' 74'; Shawal Anuar 85'; Shafiq Ghani (yellow card) 88'	Report	Masahiro Sugita 12'; Tadanari Lee 77'; Masaya Idetsu 89'	Stadium: Hougang Stadium; Referee: Muhammad Taqi

14 August 2022 20	Albirex Niigata (S) (Japan)	2–2	(Singapore) Geylang International	Jurong East
	Ilhan Fandi 58'; Tadanari Lee 90+5'	Report	Vincent Bezecourt 51' (yellow card) 90+5'; Šime Žužul 71' (pen.) (yellow card) 90+6'; Faizal Roslan (yellow card) 61'; Umar Ramle (red card) 90+3'; Abdil Qaiyyim Mutalib (yellow card) 90+4'	Stadium: Jurong East Stadium; Referee: Farhad Mohamed

19 August 2022 21	Albirex Niigata (S) (Japan)	4–2	(Singapore) Tampines Rovers	Jurong East
	Kodai Tanaka 4' 29'; Ilhan Fandi 45+2' 55'; Daichi Omori (yellow card) 76'	Report	Boris Kopitović 11'; Kyoga Nakamura 22'; Ryaan Sanizal (yellow card) 71'; Christopher van Huizen (yellow card) 44'; Taufik Suparno (yellow card) 82'	Stadium: Jurong East Stadium; Referee: Andrea Verolino

27 August 2022 22	Tanjong Pagar United (Singapore)	1–2	(Japan) Albirex Niigata (S)	Jurong East
	Blake Ricciuto 86' (yellow card) 90+1'; Akram Azman (yellow card) 90'	Report	Kumpei Kakuta 56'; Ilhan Fandi 73'; Masaya Idetsu (yellow card) 54'	Stadium: Jurong East Stadium; Referee: Jansen Foo

2 September 2022 23	Balestier Khalsa (Singapore)	3–5	(Japan) Albirex Niigata (S)	Toa Payoh
	Shuhei Hoshino 31' 54'; Kuraba Kondo 56'; Ryoya Taniguchi (penalty missed) 89; Gareth Low (yellow card) 50'; Ammirul Emmran (yellow card) 61'; Ho Wai Loon (yellow card) 76'	Report	Kodai Tanaka 50' 62' 75' 85' (pen.); Masaya Idetsu 81'; Daichi Omori (yellow card) 88'; Reo Kunimoto (yellow card) 89'	Stadium: Toa Payoh Stadium; Referee: Hilmi Fuad

10 September 2022 24	Albirex Niigata (S) (Japan)	2–1	(Singapore) Young Lions FC	Jurong East
	Tadanari Lee 20' 69'	Report	Harhys Stewart 12'	Stadium: Jurong East Stadium; Referee: Farhad Mohamed

21 October 2022 25 (Rescheduled)	Geylang International (Singapore)	1–1	(Japan) Albirex Niigata (S)	Tampines
	Šime Žužul 65' (pen.); Umar Ramle (yellow card) 25'	Report	Kodai Tanaka 74'; Kan Kobayashi (yellow card) 55'	Stadium: Our Tampines Hub; Referee: Farhad Mohamed

2 October 2022 26	Albirex Niigata (S) (Japan)	1–1	(Singapore) Hougang United	Jurong East
	Tadanari Lee 73' (yellow card) 87'; Daichi Omori (yellow card) 76'	Report	André Moritz 29'; Muhaimin Suhaimi (yellow card) 2'; Mukundan Maran (yellow card) 50'; Ajay Robson (yellow card) 84'; Afiq Noor (yellow card) 87'	Stadium: Jurong East Stadium; Referee: Jansen Foo

7 October 2022 27	Lion City Sailors (Singapore)	2–4	(Japan) Albirex Niigata (S)	Jalan Besar
	Kim Shin-wook 16'; Gabriel Quak 84' (pen.); Faris Ramli (yellow card) 45+1'; Song Ui-young (yellow card) 61'; Adam Swandi (yellow card) 69'	Report	Ilhan Fandi 5'; Kodai Tanaka 37' 77' 90+3'; Keito Hariya (yellow card) 48'	Stadium: Jalan Besar Stadium; Referee: Muhammad Taqi

15 October 2022 28	Tampines Rovers (Singapore)	5–3	(Japan) Albirex Niigata (S)	Tampines
	Boris Kopitović 10' 68'; Taufik Suparno 45+1'; Yasir Hanapi 67'; Kyoga Nakamura 89'	Report	Ilhan Fandi 1'; Kodai Tanaka 53'; Ryaan Sanizal 85' (o.g.)	Stadium: Our Tampines Hub; Referee: Ahmad A'qashah

Pos	Team	Pld	W	D	L	GF	GA	GD	Pts	Qualification or relegation
1	Albirex Niigata (S) (Note: The foreign club – Albirex Niigata (S) – as well as the Football Association of Singapore (FAS) under-21 team, Young Lions, are ineligible for any AFC competition spots.) (C)	28	17	8	3	88	43	+45	59	
2	Lion City Sailors (Q)	28	18	3	7	91	39	+52	57	Qualification for AFC Champions League Group stage
3	Tampines Rovers (Q)	28	15	5	8	76	57	+19	50	Standby team for AFC Cup group stage
4	Geylang International	28	10	9	9	48	46	+2	39	
5	Hougang United	28	10	9	9	65	71	−6	39	Qualification for AFC Cup group stage (Cup Winner)
6	Tanjong Pagar United	28	10	7	11	59	69	−10	37	
7	Balestier Khalsa	28	7	3	18	45	78	−33	24	
8	Young Lions	28	2	2	24	34	103	−69	8	

Source: Singapore Premier League
Rules for classification: 1) points; 2) goal difference; 3) number of goals scored; 4) number of wins
(C) Champions; (Q) Qualified for the phase indicated

=== Singapore Cup ===
Pos	Team	Pld	W	D	L	GF	GA	GD	Pts	Qualification
1	Albirex Niigata (S) (Q)	3	3	0	0	7	1	+6	9	Semi-finals
2	Balestier Khalsa (Q)	3	1	1	1	8	6	+2	4	Semi-finals
3	Lion City Sailors	3	0	2	1	5	6	−1	2	
4	Young Lions FC	3	0	1	2	3	10	−7	1	

Updated to match(es) played on 25 September 2019. Source: FAS
(Q) Qualified for the phase indicated

==== Group ====
27 October 2022 Match 1	Albirex Niigata (S) (Japan)	4–0	(Singapore) Young Lions FC	Jurong East
	Kodai Tanaka 5' 36'; Masaya Idetsu 21'; Masahiro Sugita 74'; Nicky Melvin Singh (yellow card) 33'; Kumpei Kakuta (yellow card) 72'	Report	Raoul Suhaimi (red card) 19'; Ryu Hardy (yellow card) 24'; Harith Kanadi (yellow card) 65'; Arshad Shamim (yellow card) 77'; Harhys Stewart (yellow card) 83'; Shah Shahiran (yellow card) 85'	Stadium: Jurong East Stadium; Referee: Farhad Mohamed

31 October 2022 Match 2	Albirex Niigata (S) (Japan)	1–0	(Singapore) Balestier Khalsa	Jurong East
	Kodai Tanaka 74' (pen.); Masahiro Sugita (penalty missed) 81; Masaya Idetsu (yellow card) 55'; Jun Kobayashi (yellow card) 87' (yellow-red card) 90+4'	Report		Stadium: Jurong East Stadium; Referee: Hilmi Fuad

5 November 2022 Match 3	Lion City Sailors (Singapore)	1–2	(Japan) Albirex Niigata (S)	Jalan Besar
	Anumanthan Kumar (yellow card) 20'; Maxime Lestienne 73' (yellow card) 45'; Haifz Nor (yellow card) 87'	Report	Masaya Idetsu 30' (yellow card) 47'; Kodai Tanaka 84'	Stadium: Jalan Besar Stadium; Referee: Farhad Mohamed

==== Semi-final ====
11 November 2022	Albirex Niigata (S) (Japan)	3–3	(Singapore) Hougang United	Jurong East
	Kan Kobayashi 3'; Kodai Tanaka 27' 38'; Kan Kobayashi (penalty missed) 61; Tatsuya Sambongi (yellow card) 90+3'	Report	Sahil Suhaimi 7' 58' (yellow card) 69'; Shawal Anuar 63'; Farhan Zulkifli (yellow card) 45+2'; Muhaimin Suhaimi (yellow card) 45+5'; Pedro Bortoluzo (yellow card) 50'; Shahfiq Ghani (yellow card) 90+2'	Stadium: Jurong East Stadium; Referee: Andrea Verolino

15 November 2022	Hougang United (Singapore)	4–2	(Japan) Albirex Niigata (S)	Hougang
	Shawal Anuar 26'; Pedro Bortoluzo 57' 74'; Kristijan Krajcek 90+3'	Report	Ilhan Fandi 77'; Tadanari Lee 90+2'; Masaya Idetsu (yellow card) 62'	Stadium: Hougang Stadium; Referee: Farhad Mohamed

Albirex Niigata (S) lost 7–5 on aggregate.

==== 3rd/4th placing ====
18 November 2022	Albriex Niigata (S) (Japan)	3–2	(Singapore) Balestier Khalsa	Jalan Besar
	Ilhan Fandi 32' 39'; Reo Kunimoto 61'; Mahiro Takahashi (yellow card) 61'; Jun Kobayashi (yellow card) 64'; Takahiro Koga (yellow card) 90+2'	Report	Daniel Goh 63'; Ryoya Tanigushi 72'; Delwinder Singh (yellow card) 89'	Stadium: Jalan Besar Stadium; Referee: Abirami Naidu

== Competition (Women's Premier League) ==
=== Women's Premier League ===
Win Draw Loss

28 May 2022 1	Albirex Niigata (S) (Japan)	1–2	(Singapore) Tanjong Pagar United	Yishun
	Nadhra Aqilah 67'	Report	Manami Fukuzawa 33'; Farah Nurzahirah 55'	Stadium: Yishun Stadium

5 June 2022 2	Lion City Sailors (Singapore)	4–1	(Japan) Albirex Niigata (S)	Yishun
	Nur Izzati Rosni 45' 87'; Dorcas Chu 49'; Madison Telmer 64'	Report	Nadhra Aqilah 77'	Stadium: Yishun Stadium

19 June 2022 3	Albirex Niigata (S) (Japan)	1–1	(Singapore) Balestier Khalsa	Yishun
	Nadhra Aqilah 87'	Report	Nasriah Ibrahim 71'	Stadium: Yishun Stadium

16 July 2022 4	Hougang United (Singapore)	1–5	(Japan) Albirex Niigata (S)	Yishun
	Elizabeth Ong 15'	Report	Amirah Syahirah 17'; Irsalina Irwan 22'; Emilia Natasha 48'; Nurhidayah Shah 74'; Noralinda Wahab 84'	Stadium: Yishun Stadium

23 July 2022 5	Albirex Niigata (S) (Japan)	5–1	(Singapore) Still Aerion	Yishun
	Siti Nor Aqilah 30'; Nurhidayah Shah 35'; Tina Afrida Nasmi 45'; Noralinda Wahab 62' 68'	Report	Joie Teo 38'	Stadium: Yishun Stadium

30 July 2022 6	Tiong Bahru FC (Singapore)	1–2	(Japan) Albirex Niigata (S)	Yishun
		Report	Kana Kitahara 38' 38'	Stadium: Yishun Stadium

6 August 2022 7	Tanjong Pagar United (Singapore)	1–2	(Japan) Albirex Niigata (S)	Yishun
	Nur Adrianna Hazeri 43'	Report	Huraizah Ismail 7'; Kana Kitahara 90+3'	Stadium: Yishun Stadium

14 August 2022 8	Albirex Niigata (S) (Japan)	0–4	(Singapore) Lion City Sailors	Yishun
		Report	Nur Izzati Rosni 1' 57' 64'; Miray Hokotate Altun 40'	Stadium: Yishun Stadium

28 August 2022 9	Balestier Khalsa (Singapore)	0–3	(Japan) Albirex Niigata (S)	Yishun
		Report	Kana Kitahara 38'; Huraizah Ismail 45+3' 86'	Stadium: Yishun Stadium

10 September 2022 10 (Rescheduled)	Albirex Niigata (S) (Japan)	4–1	(Singapore) Hougang United	Yishun
	Nur Sarah Zu'risqha 54'; Noralinda Wahab 54' 60'; Huraizah Ismail 74'	Report	Khue Tran 5'	Stadium: Yishun Stadium

24 September 2022 11 (Rescheduled)	Still Aerion (Singapore)	0–4	(Japan) Albirex Niigata (S)	Yishun
		Report	Siti Nor Aqilah 4' 76'; Lauren Reese 81'; Huraizah Ismail 86'	Stadium: Yishun Stadium

2 October 2022 12 (Rescheduled)	Albirex Niigata (S) (Japan)	3–0	(Singapore) Tiong Bahru FC	Yishun
	Tina Afrida Nasmi 26' 76'; Nurhidayah Shah 90'			Stadium: Yishun Stadium

=== League table ===
Pos	Team	Pld	W	D	L	GF	GA	GD	Pts	Qualification or relegation
1	Lion City Sailors	12	10	2	0	39	3	+36	32	Champion for 2022
2	(Japan) Albirex Niigata	12	8	1	3	31	16	+15	25	
3	Tanjong Pagar United	12	7	2	3	24	11	+13	23	
4	Tiong Bahru	12	4	3	5	15	12	+3	15	
5	Balestier Khalsa	12	2	5	5	7	19	−12	11	
6	Still Aerion Women	12	3	1	8	11	29	−18	10	
7	Hougang United	12	0	2	10	8	45	−37	2	

Updated to match(es) played on 1 Oct 2022. Source:
