= 2024–25 Singapore Cup =

Tournament details
- Country: Singapore
- Dates: 1 February – 31 May 2025
- Teams: 10

Final positions
- Champions: Lion City Sailors (8th title)
- Runners-up: BG Tampines Rovers
- Champions League Two: Lion City Sailors

Tournament statistics
- Matches played: 25
- Goals scored: 90 (3.6 per match)
- Top goal scorer: 6 players (6 goals)

The 2024–25 Singapore Cup was the 25th edition of the Singapore Cup, Singapore's annual premier club football knock-out tournament organised by the Football Association of Singapore. The winner qualified to the group stage of the 2025–26 AFC Champions League Two.

Lion City Sailors are the defending champions, having won the tournament in 2023 after defeating previous champions Hougang United 3–1 in the final. Thai side BG Pathum United will join the competition. This is the 3rd time they will play in the competition after last appearing in 2009 and 2010.

== Format ==
The 2024–25 Singapore Cup will begin on 1 February with a group stage consisting of two groups of 5 teams. The top 2 teams from each group advance to the semi-finals. The first-placed team from the group A plays the second-placed team from the group B, and reverse. The winners advance to the final.

BG Pathum United will host Geylang International and Lion City Sailors at the Jalan Besar Stadium as a neutral ground.

== Group stage ==
=== Group A ===
Pos	Team	Pld	W	D	L	GF	GA	GD	Pts	Qualification
1	BG Tampines Rovers	4	3	1	0	12	4	+8	10	Semi-finals
2	DPMM	4	2	1	1	7	7	0	7	Semi-finals
3	Young Lions	4	2	0	2	11	7	+4	6	
4	Hougang United	4	2	0	2	8	10	−2	6	
5	Albirex Niigata (S)	4	0	0	4	4	14	−10	0	

Source: FAS
1 February 2025

Albirex Niigata (S)	1–2	Hougang United
Shingo Nakano 63'	Report	Zulfahmi Arifin 18'; Dejan Račić 21'; Ismail Salihović (yellow card) 22'; Danish Irfan (yellow card) 65'

Jurong East Stadium, Jurong East
Referee: Andrea Verolino
1 February 2025

BG Tampines Rovers	1–1	DPMM
Seia Kunori 80'; Shah Shahiran (yellow card) 53'; Irfan Najeeb (yellow card) 73'; Taufik Suparno (yellow card) 74'; Syazwan Buhari (yellow card) 89'		Nazry Aiman Azaman 90+5'; Farshad Noor (yellow card) 78'

Jalan Besar Stadium, Jalan Besar Stadium
Referee: Muhammad Taqi

15 February 2025

Albirex Niigata (S)	1–2	BG Tampines Rovers
Arshad Shamim 82'	Report	Arya Igami Tarhani 52'; Koki Kawachi 64' (o.g.); Joel Chew (yellow card) 82'

Jurong East Stadium, Jurong East
Referee: Hilmi Fuad
15 February 2025

Young Lions	0–2	DPMM
Aizil Yazid (red card) 95'		Dāvis Ikaunieks 8' (pen.); Miguel Oliveira 71'; Nazirrudin Ismail (yellow card) 15'; Kristijan Naumovski (yellow card) 35'; Najib Tarif (yellow card) 63'

Jalan Besar Stadium, Jalan Besar
Referee: Ahmad A'Qashah

1 March 2025

Hougang United	0–3	Young Lions
Nazrul Nazari (yellow card) 45+3'; Zaiful Nizam (red card) 45+3'		Fairuz Fazli Koh 16'; Kaisei Ogawa 45+4' (pen.); Nazrul Nazari 53' (o.g.)

Jalan Besar Stadium, Jalan Besar
Referee: Farhan Mohd
3 March 2025

DPMM	3–1	Albirex Niigata (S)
Dāvis Ikaunieks 30', 88'; Nurikhwan Othman 72'; Miguel Oliveira (yellow card) 74'	Report	Shingo Nakano 80'; Junki Kenn Yoshimura (yellow card) 40'

Jalan Besar Stadium, Jalan Besar
Referee: Jansen Foo

15 March 2025

DPMM	1–5	Hougang United
Dāvis Ikaunieks 51'; Jamie McAllister (yellow card) 67'; Najib Tarif (yellow card) 70'; Nazry Aiman Azaman (yellow card) 73'; Damir Muminovic (yellow card) 77'; Azwan Ali Rahman (yellow card) 90+5'	Report	Daniel Alemão 21'; Shodai Yokoyama 38'; Shahdan Sulaiman 70'; Dejan Račić 81'; Stjepan Plazonja 90+5'; Ismail Salihović (yellow card) 90+1'

Jalan Besar Stadium, Jalan Besar
Referee: Oswind Suriya
16 March 2025

BG Tampines Rovers	4–1	Young Lions
Itsuki Enomoto 20', 32'; Shah Shahiran 22'; Joel Chew 47'; Taufik Suparno (yellow card) 67'; Dylan Fox (yellow card) 90+6'		Jun Kobayashi 66'

Jalan Besar Stadium, Jalan Besar
Referee: Ahmad A'Qashah

28 March 2025

Young Lions	7–1	Albirex Niigata (S)
Kaisei Ogawa 5', 21', 58', 66'; Kan Kobayashi 12', 80'; Amir Syafiz 61'; Fairuz Fazli Koh (yellow card) 78'		Daniel Goh 9'; Gareth Low (yellow card) 26' (yellow-red card); SteviaEgbus Mikuni (yellow card) 29'

Jurong East Stadium, Jurong East
Referee: Oswind Suriya
29 March 2025

Hougang United	1–5	BG Tampines Rovers
Louka Tan 80'	Report	Itsuki Enomoto 50'; Shah Shahiran 65' (pen.); Dylan Fox 82' (yellow card) 55'; Faris Ramli 84', 90+4'

Jalan Besar Stadium, Jalan Besar
Referee: Muhammad Taqi

=== Group B ===
Pos	Team	Pld	W	D	L	GF	GA	GD	Pts	Qualification
1	Lion City Sailors	4	3	1	0	12	4	+8	10	Semi-finals
2	BG Pathum United	4	2	2	0	7	5	+2	8	Semi-finals
3	Balestier Khalsa	4	2	0	2	10	10	0	6	
4	Tanjong Pagar United	4	1	0	3	3	9	−6	3	
5	Geylang International	4	0	1	3	7	11	−4	1	

Source: FAS
2 February 2025

Tanjong Pagar United	1–2	BG Pathum United
Salif Cissé 11'; Rezza Rezky (yellow card) 43'; Shodai Nishikawa (yellow card) 45'	Report	Marco Ballini 22'; Hwang Myung-hyun 76'; Kanokpon Buspakom (yellow card) 53'

Jurong East Stadium, Jurong East
Referee: Jansen Foo
2 February 2025

Geylang International	4–5	Balestier Khalsa
Tomoyuki Doi 5', 44', 81'; Keito Hariya 15'; Hud Ismail (yellow card) 32'		Anton Fase 3'; Kodai Tanaka 26', 50', 58'; Ignatius Ang 60'; Masahiro Sugita (yellow card) 34'; Darren Teh (yellow card) 38'; Harith Kanadi (yellow card) 42'; Abdil Qaiyyim Mutalib (yellow card) 66'

Jalan Besar Stadium, Jalan Besar
Referee: Ahmad A'Qashah

16 February 2025

BG Pathum United	2–2	Geylang International
Naqiuddin Eunos 35' (o.g.); Airfan Doloh 38'; Marco Ballini (yellow card) 45+4'; Ikhsan Fandi (penalty missed) 85; Kanokpon Buspakom (yellow card) 90+8'	Report	Tomoyuki Doi 5', 7' (penalty missed) 45+4 (yellow card) 74'; Huzaifah Aziz (yellow card) 14'

Jalan Besar Stadium, Jalan Besar
Referee: Farhan Mohd
16 February 2025

Lion City Sailors	4–1	Tanjong Pagar United
Bart Ramselaar 26', 47'; Akram Azman 78'; Abdul Rasaq 88'	Report	Faizal Roslan 70'; Raihan Rahman (yellow card) 35'

Bishan Stadium, Bishan
Referee: Zulfiqar Mustaffa

2 March 2025

Balestier Khalsa	1–2	BG Pathum United
Anton Fase 9'; Kodai Tanaka (penalty missed) 87; Jared Gallagher (yellow card) 67'	Report	Patrik Gustavsson 15'; Nattawut Suksum 45+1' (penalty missed) 45+1; Nuttawut Wongsawang (red card) 25'; Teerapat Pruetong (yellow card) 51'; Sanchai Nontasila (yellow card) 64'

Bishan Stadium, Bishan
Referee: Hilmi Fuad

15 March 2025

Tanjong Pagar United	1–0	Geylang International
Faizal Roslan 83' (pen.); Zenivio (yellow card) 25'; Rezza Rezky (yellow card) 26'		Rio Sakuma (yellow card) 35'; Naufal Azman (yellow card) 87'

Jurong East Stadium, Jurong East
Referee: Farhan Mohd
16 March 2025

Lion City Sailors	4–1	Balestier Khalsa
Song Ui-young 7'; Bart Ramselaar 25', 88', 90+2'	Report	Kodai Tanaka 52'

Bishan Stadium, Bishan
Referee: Zulfiqar Mustaffa

27 March 2025 (Rescheduled)

Geylang International	1–3	Lion City Sailors
Tomoyuki Doi 55' (pen.); Shakir Hamzah (yellow card) 26'	Report	Lennart Thy 3', 67', 75'; Anumanthan Kumar (yellow card) 30'; Song Ui-young (yellow card) 39'

Jalan Besar Stadium, Jalan Besar
Referee: Clarence Leow

29 March 2025

Balestier Khalsa	3–0	Tanjong Pagar United
Kodai Tanaka 12', 18'; Masahiro Sugita 76'	Report	Azim Akbar (yellow card) 75'; Zenivio (yellow card) 90'

Bishan Stadium, Bishan
Referee: Syarqawi Buhari
30 March 2025

BG Pathum United	1–1	Lion City Sailors
Thanet Suknate 90+5'; Hwang Myung-hyun (yellow card) 22'	Report	Song Ui-young (red card) 6'; Abdul Rasaq 35' (yellow card) 15'; Akram Azman (yellow card) 83'

Jalan Besar Stadium, Jalan Besar
Referee: Jansen Foo

== Semi-finals ==
First legs will be played on 16 April & 21 May, and second on 27 May 2025.

Team 1	Agg.	Team 2	1st leg	2nd leg
BG Tampines Rovers	4–3	BG Pathum United	1–1	3–2 (ET)
Lion City Sailors	5–2	DPMM	3–2	2–0

16 April 2025

BG Pathum United	1–1	BG Tampines Rovers
Kodai Tanaka 35'; Kanokpon Buspakom (yellow card) 62'; Hwang Myung-hyun (yellow card) 72'; Airfan Doloh (yellow card) 77'	Report	Shuya Yamashita 3'; Kyoga Nakamura (yellow card) 32'; Shah Shahiran (yellow card) 61'

Jalan Besar Stadium, Jalan Besar
Referee: Andrea Verolino
27 May 2025

BG Tampines Rovers	3–2 (a.e.t.)	BG Pathum United
Glenn Kweh 16'; Seia Kunori 58'; Sarach Yooyen 114' (o.g.); Irfan Najeeb (yellow card) 42'; Taufik Suparno (yellow card) 120+5'		Seydine N'Diaye 41', 76'; Sanchai Nontasila (yellow card) 45'; Hwang Myung-hyun (yellow card) 85'; Sarach Yooyen (yellow card) 89'; Freddy Álvarez (yellow card) 95'; Ikhsan Fandi (yellow card) 120'; Airfan Doloh (yellow card) 120+2'

Jalan Besar Stadium, Jalan Besar
Referee: Ahmad A'Qashah

Tampines Rovers won 4–3 on aggregate after extra time.

21 May 2025 (Rescheduled)

DPMM	2–3	Lion City Sailors
Azwan Ali Rahman 8'; Gabriel Gama 57'	Report	Maxime Lestienne 45'; Toni Datković 66'; Bailey Wright 70'

Jalan Besar Stadium, Jalan Besar
Referee: Zulfiqar Mustaffa
27 May 2025

Lion City Sailors	2–0	DPMM
Diogo Costa 33'; Toni Datković 60'	Report	Gabriel Gama (yellow card) 31'; Abdul Hariz Herman (yellow card) 7'; Damir Muminovic (yellow card) 58'; Nur Ikhwan Othman (yellow card) 58'

Bishan Stadium, Bishan
Referee: Jansen Foo

Lion City Sailors won 5–2 on aggregate.

== Final ==
31 May 2025

BG Tampines Rovers	0–1	Lion City Sailors
Miloš Zlatković (yellow card) 85'; Shah Shahiran (red card) 90+4'	Report	Bart Ramselaar 49' (yellow card) 90'; Song Ui-young (yellow card) 45+1'

Jalan Besar Stadium, Jalan Besar
Attendance: 2,766
Referee: Muhammad Taqi

== Statistics ==
=== Top scorer ===
As of 31 May 2025

Rank	Player	Team	Goals
1	(Japan) Kodai Tanaka	Balestier Khalsa	6
1	(Japan) Tomoyuki Doi	Geylang International	6
1	(Netherlands) Bart Ramselaar	Lion City Sailors	6
2	(Japan) Kaisei Ogawa	Young Lions FC	5
3	(Latvia) Dāvis Ikaunieks	DPMM FC	4
4	(Germany) Lennart Thy	Lion City Sailors	3
4	(Japan) Itsuki Enomoto	BG Tampines Rovers	3
4	(Japan) Seia Kunori	BG Tampines Rovers	3
5	(Japan) Shingo Nakano	Albirex Niigata (S)	2
5	(Netherlands) (Suriname) Anton Fase	Balestier Khalsa	2
5	(France) (Niger) Seydine N'Diaye	BG Pathum United	2
5	(Singapore) Shah Shahiran	BG Tampines Rovers	2
5	(Singapore) Faris Ramli	BG Tampines Rovers	2
5	(Montenegro) Dejan Račić	Hougang United	2
5	(Singapore) (Nigeria) Abdul Rasaq	Lion City Sailors	2
5	(Croatia) Toni Datković	Lion City Sailors	2
5	(Singapore) Faizal Roslan	Tanjong Pagar United	2
5	(Japan) Kan Kobayashi	Young Lions FC	2
5	(Singapore) Arshad Shamim	Albirex Niigata (S)	1
5	(Singapore) Daniel Goh	Albirex Niigata (S)	1
5	(Singapore) Ignatius Ang	Balestier Khalsa	1
5	(Japan) Masahiro Sugita	Balestier Khalsa	1
5	(South Korea) Hwang Myung-hyun	BG Pathum United	1
5	(Thailand) Airfan Doloh	BG Pathum United	1
5	(Thailand) Thanet Suknate	BG Pathum United	1
5	(Japan) Kodai Tanaka	BG Pathum United	1
5	(Thailand) (Italy) Marco Ballini	BG Pathum United	1
5	(Thailand) (Sweden) Patrik Gustavsson	BG Pathum United	1
5	(Japan) Shuya Yamashita	BG Tampines Rovers	1
5	(Singapore) Glenn Kweh	BG Tampines Rovers	1
5	(Singapore) Joel Chew	BG Tampines Rovers	1
5	(Japan) (Iran) Arya Igami Tarhani	BG Tampines Rovers	1
5	(Australia) (Northern Ireland) Dylan Fox	BG Tampines Rovers	1
5	(Brazil) Gabriel Gama	DPMM FC	1
5	(Brunei) Azwan Ali Rahman	DPMM FC	1
5	(Brunei) Nazry Aiman Azaman	DPMM FC	1
5	(Brunei) Nurikhwan Othman	DPMM FC	1
5	(Portugal) Miguel Oliveira	DPMM FC	1
5	(Japan) Keito Hariya	Geylang International	1
5	(Singapore) Zulfahmi Arifin	Hougang United	1
5	(Singapore) Shahdan Sulaiman	Hougang United	1
5	(Japan) Shodai Yokoyama	Hougang United	1
5	(Croatia) Stjepan Plazonja	Hougang United	1
5	(Brazil) Daniel Alemão	Hougang United	1
5	(Singapore) (France) Louka Vaissierre Tan Jun Cheng	Hougang United	1
5	(Singapore) (South Korea) Song Ui-young	Lion City Sailors	1
5	(Singapore) Akram Azman	Lion City Sailors	1
5	(Australia) Bailey Wright	Lion City Sailors	1
5	(Belgium) Maxime Lestienne	Lion City Sailors	1
5	(Portugal) Diogo Costa	Lion City Sailors	1
5	(France) (Mali) Salif Cissé	Tanjong Pagar United	1
5	(Singapore) Fairuz Fazli Koh	Young Lions FC	1
5	(Singapore) Amir Syafiz	Young Lions FC	1
5	(Japan) Jun Kobayashi	Young Lions FC	1

=== Top assists ===
As of 31 May 2025

Rank	Player	Team	Assists
1	(Japan) Kan Kobayashi	Young Lions FC	3
2	(Japan) Shuhei Hoshino	Albirex Niigata (S)	2
2	(Japan) Masahiro Sugita	Balestier Khalsa	2
2	(Serbia) Miloš Zlatković	BG Tampines Rovers	2
2	(Singapore) (Japan) Kyoga Nakamura	BG Tampines Rovers	2
2	(Japan) (Iran) Arya Igami Tarhani	BG Tampines Rovers	2
2	(Singapore) Glenn Kweh	BG Tampines Rovers	2
2	(Portugal) Miguel Oliveira	DPMM FC	2
2	(Brunei) Azwan Ali Rahman	DPMM FC	2
2	(Singapore) Farhan Zulkifli	Hougang United	2
2	(Australia) Bailey Wright	Lion City Sailors	2
2	(Belgium) Maxime Lestienne	Lion City Sailors	2
3	(Singapore) Syukri Bashir	Albirex Niigata (S)	1
3	(Japan) Yohei Otake	Albirex Niigata (S)	1
3	(Singapore) Ignatius Ang	Balestier Khalsa	1
3	(Singapore) Darren Teh	Balestier Khalsa	1
3	(Japan) Riku Fukashiro	Balestier Khalsa	1
3	(Netherlands) (Suriname) Anton Fase	Balestier Khalsa	1
3	(Singapore) (Republic of Ireland) Jared Gallagher	Balestier Khalsa	1
3	(Japan) Kodai Tanaka	BG Pathum United	1
3	(South Korea) Hwang Myung-hyun	BG Pathum United	1
3	(Thailand) Teerapat Pruetong	BG Pathum United	1
3	(Thailand) Kanokpon Buspakom	BG Pathum United	1
3	(Costa Rica) Freddy Álvarez	BG Pathum United	1
3	(Thailand) Chanathip Songkrasin	BG Pathum United	1
3	(Australia) (Northern Ireland) Dylan Fox	BG Tampines Rovers	1
3	(Japan) Itsuki Enomoto	BG Tampines Rovers	1
3	(Japan) Seia Kunori	BG Tampines Rovers	1
3	(Brunei) Hanif Farhan Azman	DPMM FC	1
3	(Brazil) Gabriel Gama	DPMM FC	1
3	(Japan) Ryoya Taniguchi	Geylang International	1
3	(Japan) Takahiro Tezuka	Geylang International	1
3	(Singapore) Iqbal Hussain	Geylang International	1
3	(Singapore) Zulfahmi Arifin	Hougang United	1
3	(Croatia) Stjepan Plazonja	Hougang United	1
3	(Serbia) Ismail Salihović	Hougang United	1
3	(Japan) Shodai Yokoyama	Hougang United	1
3	(Croatia) Toni Datković	Lion City Sailors	1
3	(Germany) Lennart Thy	Lion City Sailors	1
3	(Netherlands) Bart Ramselaar	Lion City Sailors	1
3	(Portugal) Rui Pires	Lion City Sailors	1
3	(Singapore) Anumanthan Kumar	Lion City Sailors	1
3	(Singapore) Lionel Tan	Lion City Sailors	1
3	(Singapore) Shawal Anuar	Lion City Sailors	1
3	(Singapore) Nathan Mao Zhi Xuan	Lion City Sailors	1
3	(Singapore) (Nigeria) Abdul Rasaq	Lion City Sailors	1
3	(Singapore) Syed Akmal	Tanjong Pagar United	1
3	(Singapore) Raoul Suhaimi	Young Lions FC	1
3	(Singapore) Syafi Hilman	Young Lions FC	1
3	(Singapore) Amir Syafiz	Young Lions FC	1
3	(Japan) Kaisei Ogawa	Young Lions FC	1

=== Clean sheets ===
As of 31 May 2025

Rank	Player	Team	Clean sheets
1	(Singapore) Zharfan Rohaizad	Lion City Sailors	2
2	(North Macedonia) Kristijan Naumovski	Brunei DPMM	1
2	(Singapore) Hafiz Ahmad	Balestier Khalsa	1
2	(Canada) Matt Silva	Tanjong Pagar United	1
2	(Singapore) Umayr Sujuandy	Young Lions FC	1

=== Own goal ===
As of 27 May 2025

Player	For	Against	Date
(Japan) Koki Kawachi	Albirex Niigata (S)	Tampines Rovers	15 Feb 25
(Singapore) Naqiuddin Eunos	Geylang International	BG Pathum United	16 Feb 25
(Singapore) Nazrul Nazari	Hougang United	Young Lions FC	1 Mar 25
(Thailand) Sarach Yooyen	BG Pathum United	Tampines Rovers	27 May 25

=== Hat-tricks ===
As of 28 Mar 2025

Player	For	Against	Date
(Japan) Kodai Tanaka	Balestier Khalsa	Geylang International	5–4 (2 Feb 2025)
(Japan) Tomoyuki Doi	Geylang International	Balestier Khalsa	4–5 (2 Feb 2025)
(Netherlands) Bart Ramselaar	Lion City Sailors	Balestier Khalsa	4–1 (16 Mar 2025)
(Germany) Lennart Thy	Lion City Sailors	Geylang International	3–1 (27 Mar 2025)
(Japan) Kaisei Ogawa ^{4}	Young Lions FC	Albirex Niigata (S)	7–1 (28 Mar 2025)

Note ^{4} Player scored 4 goals

=== Penalty missed ===
As at 2 Mar 2025

Player	For	Against	Date
(Japan) Tomoyuki Doi	Geylang International	BG Pathum United	16 Feb 25
(Singapore) Ikhsan Fandi	BG Pathum United	Geylang International	16 Feb 25
(Thailand) Nattawut Suksum	BG Pathum United	Balestier Khalsa	2 Mar 25
(Japan) Kodai Tanaka	Balestier Khalsa	BG Pathum United	2 Mar 25
