= 2022 Singapore Cup =

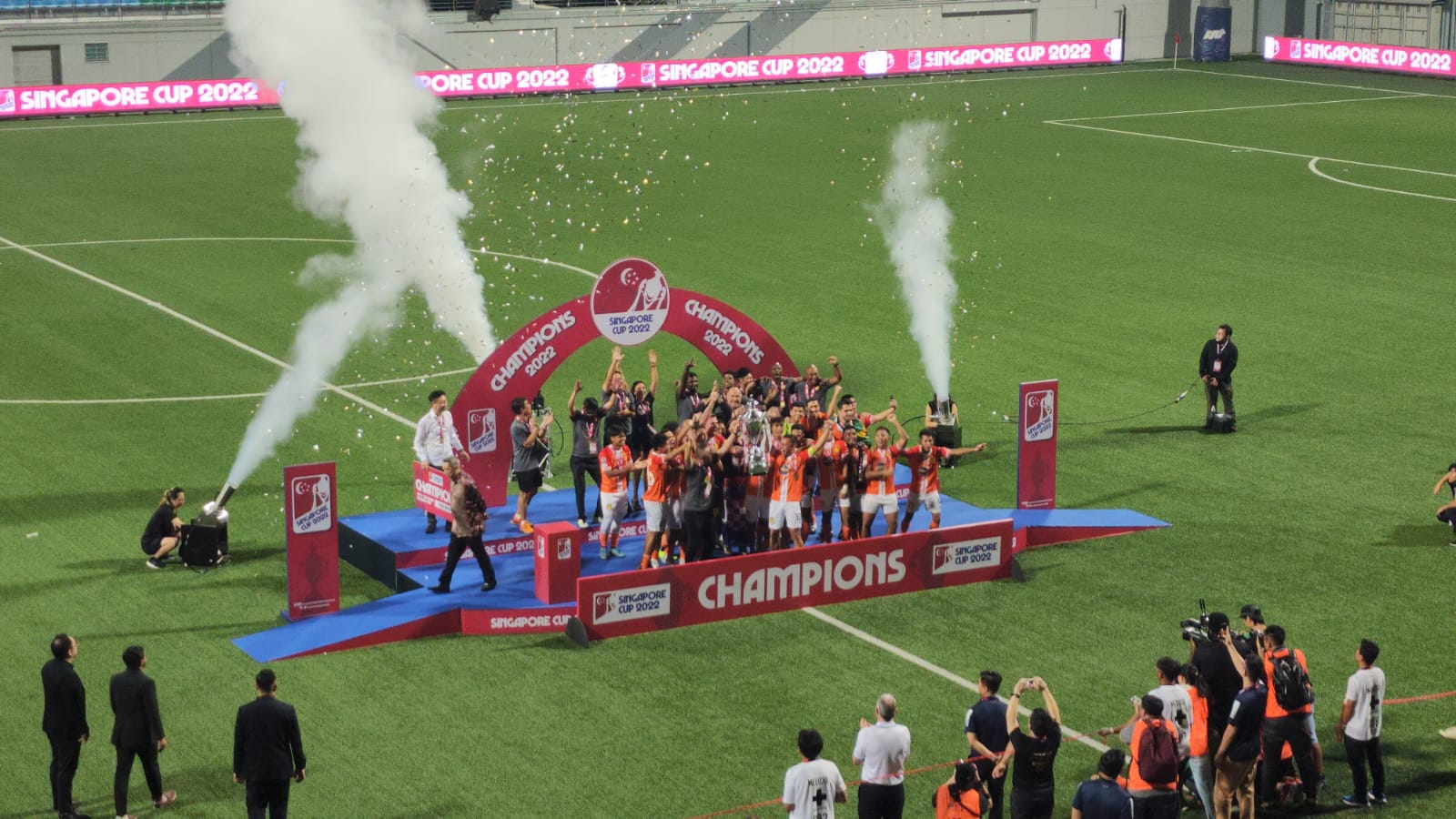
- Hougang United lifting the Singapore Cup trophy after winning its 2022 edition

Tournament details
- Country: Singapore
- Dates: 27 October – 19 November 2022
- Teams: 8

Final positions
- Champions: Hougang United (1st title)
- Runners-up: Tampines Rovers
- Third place: (Japan) Albirex Niigata (S)

Tournament statistics
- Matches played: 18
- Goals scored: 78 (4.33 per match)
- Top goal scorer: (Japan) Kodai Tanaka (6 goals)

The 2022 Singapore Cup was the 23rd edition of the Singapore Cup, Singapore's annual premier club football knock-out tournament organised by the Football Association of Singapore.

Tampines Rovers were the defending champions, having won the tournament when it was last held in 2019. The cup had returned after a pandemic-enforced absence over the past two years. The draw was held on 27 September 2022.

Hougang United defeated defending champions Tampines Rovers 3–2 in the final to win their inaugural Singapore Cup.

== Format ==
=== Competition ===
The 2022 Singapore Cup commenced on 27 October 2022 with a group phase of two groups with four teams each. The teams competed in a single-round group stage. The top two teams advanced to the semifinals with the group winners facing the runner-up team from the other group.

== Groups ==
=== Group A ===
Pos	Team	Pld	W	D	L	GF	GA	GD	Pts	Qualification
1	Albirex Niigata (S) (Q)	3	3	0	0	7	1	+6	9	Semi-finals
2	Balestier Khalsa (Q)	3	1	1	1	8	6	+2	4	Semi-finals
3	Lion City Sailors	3	0	2	1	5	6	−1	2	
4	Young Lions FC	3	0	1	2	3	10	−7	1	

Updated to match(es) played on 25 September 2019. Source: FAS
(Q) Qualified for the phase indicated
27 October 2022

Albirex Niigata (S)	4–0	Young Lions
Tanaka 5' 36'; Idetsu 21'; Sugita 74'	Report

Jurong East Stadium, Jurong East
Referee: Farhad Mohamed
27 October 2022

	3–3	Balestier Khalsa
Faris 14'; Lestienne 47' 57'	Report	Kondo 22' 55'; Hoshino 66'

Jalan Besar Stadium, Jalan Besar
Referee: Ahmad A'qashah

31 October 2022

Young Lions	1–1	Lion City Sailors
Izwan 45' (o.g.)	Report	Kim 74'

Jalan Besar Stadium, Jalan Besar
Referee: Taufik Thana
31 October 2022

Albirex Niigata (S)	1–0	Balestier Khalsa
Tanaka 73'	Report

Jurong East Stadium, Jurong East
Referee: Hilmi Fuad

5 November 2022

Balestier Khalsa	5–2	Young Lions
Daniel Goh 9'; Kondo 11' 30'; Hoshino 21'; Tanigushi 38'	Report	Rasaq 41'; Emaviwe 48'

Toa Payoh Stadium, Toa Payoh
Referee: Andrea Verolino
5 November 2022

	1–2	Albirex Niigata (S)
Lestienne 73'	Report	Idetsu 30'; Tanaka 84'

Jalan Besar Stadium, Jalan Besar
Referee: Farhad Mohamed

=== Group B ===
Pos	Team	Pld	W	D	L	GF	GA	GD	Pts	Qualification
1	Tampines Rovers (Q)	3	2	0	1	7	4	+3	6	Semi-finals
2	Hougang United (Q)	3	2	0	1	6	4	+2	6	Semi-finals
3	Tanjong Pagar United	3	2	0	1	6	6	0	6	
4	Geylang International	3	0	0	3	4	9	−5	0	

Updated to match(es) played on 25 September 2022. Source: FAS
(Q) Qualified for the phase indicated
28 October 2022

Geylang International	2–3	Tampines Rovers
Žužul 67'; Hairie 88'	Report	Faizal 3' (o.g.); Kopitović 44' (pen.); Nakamura 90+1'

Our Tampines Hub, Tampines
Referee: Shadiq Al-Hussain
28 October 2022

Tanjong Pagar United	3–1	Hougang United
Ricciuto 45'; Nishiguchi 69' 71'	Report	Sahil 17'

Jurong East Stadium, Jurong East
Referee: Hilmi Fuad

1 November 2022

Hougang United	4–1	Geylang International
Shawal 34'; Recha 48'; Moritz 55'; Krajcek 75'	Report	Hazzuwan 9'

Hougang Stadium, Hougang
Referee: Muhammad Taqi
1 November 2022

Tampines Rovers	4–1	Tanjong Pagar United
Yasir 15'; Kopitović 26'; Nakamura 60'; Taufik 72'	Report	Nishiguchi 23'

Our Tampines Hub, Tampines
Referee: Ahmad A'qashah

6 November 2022

Hougang United	1–0	Tampines Rovers
Sahil 53'	Report

Hougang Stadium, Hougang
Referee: Taufik Thana
6 November 2022

Tanjong Pagar United	2–1	Geylang International
Amri 43'; Nishiguchi 56'	Report	Hazzuwan 41'

Jurong East Stadium, Jurong East
Referee: Shadiq Al-Hussain

== Semi-finals ==
The first legs will be played on 11 November 2022, and the second legs will be played on 15 November 2022.

Team 1	Agg.	Team 2	1st leg	2nd leg
Albirex Niigata (S)	5–7	Hougang United	3–3	2–4
Tampines Rovers	9–1	Balestier Khalsa	8–1	1–0

11 November 2022

Albirex Niigata (S)	3–3	Hougang United
K. Kobayashi 3'; Tanaka 27', 38'	Report	Sahil 7', 58'; Shawal 63'

Jurong East Stadium, Jurong East
Referee: Andrea Verolino
15 November 2022

Hougang United	4–2	Albirex Niigata (S)
Shawal 26'; Bortoluzo 57', 74'; Krajcek 90+3'	Report	Fandi 77'; Lee 90+2'

Hougang Stadium, Hougang
Referee: Farhad Mohamed

Hougang United won 7–5 on aggregate.

11 November 2022

Tampines Rovers	8–1	Balestier Khalsa
Taufik 26'; Yasir 27'; Kopitović 31', 71', 73'; Chew 52'; Mehmedović 78', 90+1'	Report	Goh 81'

Our Tampines Hub, Tampines
Referee: Shadiq Al-Hussain
15 November 2022

Balestier Khalsa	0–1	Tampines Rovers
	Report	Hairul 12' (o.g.)

Toa Payoh Stadium, Toa Payoh
Referee: Hilmi Fuad

Tampines won 9–1 on aggregate.

== 3rd / 4th ==
18 November 2022

Albriex Niigata (S)	3–2	Balestier Khalsa
Fandi 32', 39'; Kunimoto 61'	Report	Goh 63'; Tanigushi 72'

Jalan Besar Stadium, Jalan Besar
Referee: Abirami Naidu

== Final ==
19 November 2022

Hougang United	3–2	Tampines Rovers
Krajcek 17', 57', 79'	Report	Taufik 39'; Najeeb 48'

Jalan Besar Stadium, Jalan Besar
Attendance: 2983
Referee: Ahmad A'qashah

== Season statistics ==
=== Top scorers ===
As of 19 Nov 2022

Rank	Player	Club	Goals
1	(Japan) Kodai Tanaka	Albirex Niigata (S)	6
2	(Montenegro) Boris Kopitović	Tampines Rovers	5
2	(Croatia) Kristijan Krajcek	Hougang United	5
3	(Japan) Kuraba Kondo	Balestier Khalsa	4
3	(Singapore) Sahil Suhaimi	Hougang United	4
3	(Japan) Reo Nishiguchi	Tanjong Pagar United	4
4	(Singapore) Ilhan Fandi	Albirex Niigata (S)	3
4	(Singapore) Daniel Goh	Balestier Khalsa	3
4	(Japan) Ryoya Tanigushi	Balestier Khalsa	3
4	(Singapore) Shawal Anuar	Hougang United	3
4	(Belgium) Maxime Lestienne	Lion City Sailors	3
4	(Singapore) Taufik Suparno	Tampines Rovers	3

=== Clean sheets ===
As of 15 Nov 2022

Rank	Player	Club	Clean sheets
1	(Japan) Takahiro Koga	Albirex Niigata (S)	2
2	(Singapore) Zainol Gulam	Hougang United	1
2	(Singapore) Syazwan Buhari	Tampines Rovers	1

=== Own goals ===
As of 31 Oct 2022

Rank	Player	For	Against	Date
1	(Singapore) Faizal Roslan	Geylang International	Tampines Rovers	28 Oct 2022
1	(Singapore) Izwan Mahbud	Lion City Sailors	Young Lions FC	31 Oct 2022
1	(Singapore) Hairul Syirhan	Balestier Khalsa	Tampines Rovers	15 Nov 2022

=== Yellow Cards (Players) ===
As of 18 Nov 2022

Rank	Player	Club	Yellow Cards
1	(Japan) Masaya Idetsu	Albirex Niigata (S)	3
1	(Croatia) Kristijan Krajcek	Hougang United	3
2	(Japan) Jun Kobayashi	Albirex Niigata (S)	2
2	(Singapore) Ahmad Syahir	Geylang International	2
2	(Singapore) Huzaifah Aziz	Geylang International	2
2	(Brazil) Pedro Bortoluzo	Hougang United	2
2	(Singapore) Muhaimin Suhaimi	Hougang United	2
2	(Singapore) Sahil Suhaimi	Hougang United	2
2	(Singapore) Ryaan Sanizal	Tampines Rovers	2
2	(Singapore) Taufik Suparno	Tampines Rovers	2
2	(Singapore) Raihan Rahman	Tanjong Pagar United	2
2	(Singapore) Rusyaidi Salime	Tanjong Pagar United	2
2	(Singapore) Shah Shahiran	Young Lions FC	2

=== Red Cards (Players) ===
As of 31 Oct 2022

Rank	Player	Club	Red Cards
1	(Japan) Jun Kobayashi	Albirex Niigata (S)	1
1	(Brazil) Pedro Bortoluzo	Hougang United	1
1	(Singapore) Raoul Suhaimi	Young Lions FC	1

=== Disciplinary (Team) ===
As of 19 Nov 2022

Rank	Club	Yellow Cards	Red Cards
1	Hougang United	19	1
2	Tampines Rovers	13	0
3	Albirex Niigata (S)	11	1
4	Young Lions FC	10	1
5	Tanjong Pagar United	8	0
5	Balestier Khalsa	8	0
6	Geylang International	7	0
6	Lion City Sailors	7	0

=== Penalty missed ===
Player	For	Against	Date
(Japan) Masahiro Sugita	Albirex Niigata (S)	Balestier Khalsa	31 Oct 2022
(Japan) Reo Nishiguchi	Tanjong Pagar United	Tampines Rovers	1 Nov 2022
(Japan) Kan Kobayashi	Albirex Niigata (S)	Hougang United	11 Nov 2022
(Japan) Ryoya Tanigushi	Balestier Khalsa	Tampines Rovers	15 Nov 2022
