= John Rawling Todd =

British colonial civil servant (1929–2002)

- 杜迪

Secretary for Housing
- In office 1986–1988
- Preceded by: David Ford
- Succeeded by: Position abolished Dominic Wong (1994)

Personal details
- Born: 15 February 1929
- Died: 18 July 2002 (aged 73) Wiltshire, England
- Education: Hatfield College, Durham
- Profession: Civil servant

John Rawling Todd (Chinese: 杜迪) CVO OBE JP (15 February 1929 – 18 July 2002) was a British colonial civil servant. He held progressively senior roles in the administration of British Hong Kong, and served as Secretary for Housing from 1986 to 1988. Earlier in his career he was involved in the forced deportation of the Chagossians.

== Early life ==
Todd was born on 15 February 1929 to William Rawling Todd and Isabella May Shearer. He was educated at Durham University (Hatfield College), where he was Captain of the Hatfield College Fencing Club in 1949. He completed his national service in the Royal Artillery, and was made 2nd Lieutenant on 14 February 1953, with the appointment gazetted on 24 March 1953.

== Career ==
After leaving the military, Todd pursued a career in the Colonial Service and took up his first appointment as an Administrator Officer in the Gambia in 1955. He was assigned to New Hebrides in 1962 and was an Administrator of the British Indian Ocean Territory from 8 November 1965 to 1974.

=== Chagos Islands ===
In 1971, as Administrator of Diego Garcia, Todd announced to islanders in April of that year that they would all be expelled from their homeland, the island having been leased to the US Military. He was accused by two islanders of ordering their pet dogs to be gassed, although this decision has also been blamed on Bruce Greatbatch. Todd was seconded to the Foreign and Commonwealth Office in 1974.

=== Hong Kong ===
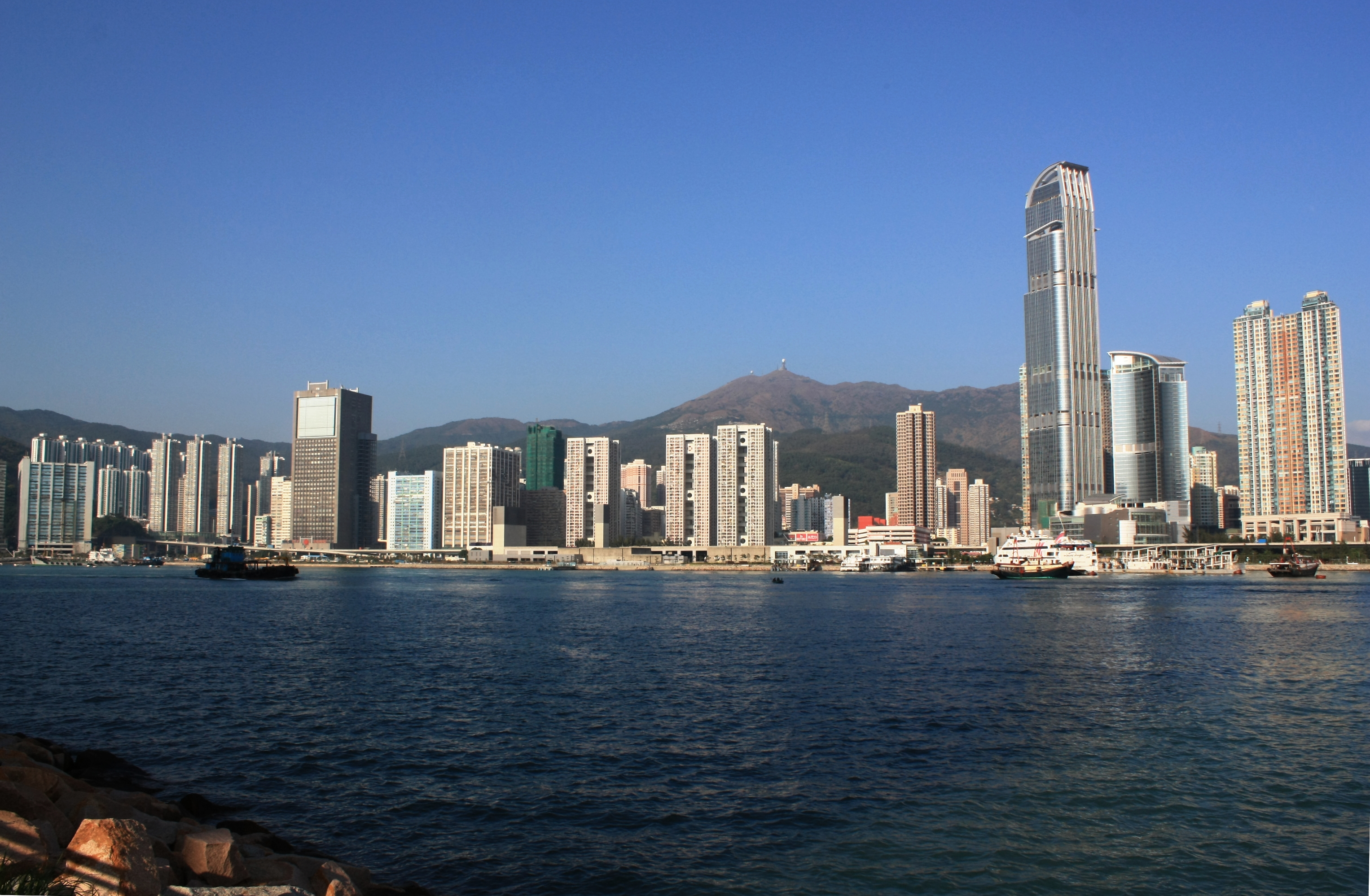
Tsuen Wan, where Todd worked from 1976

He was sent to Hong Kong as the District Officer for Tsuen Wan in 1976. Todd was one of the officials, alongside David Akers-Jones and David Ford, who worked on the Green Paper on the introduction of District Board elections, published in April 1980 and with its recommendations coming into effect in 1982.

He subsequently became Deputy Secretary of Lands and then Director of Lands from April 1982 to April 1986. He became Senior British Representative of the Sino-British Land Commission from 1984 to 1988 after the Sino-British Joint Declaration was signed. This was a busy period in his career, as the land issue (concerning leasing and property rights) was among the most contentious topics discussed in the negotiations that led to the Joint Declaration. Todd served in the Land Commission alongside John Chan and Registrar-General Noel Gleeson.

In 1986, he was appointed Secretary for Housing. In 1991, he became Chairman of the Special Committee on Compensation & Betterment. As chairman, Todd published a report in March 1992 that did not recommend providing compensation to landowners whose development rights were affected by rezoning. For his public services, he was appointed CVO in 1972 and Officer of the Order of the British Empire (OBE) in 1985.

== Personal life ==
Todd retired from Hong Kong in 1988 and later moved to Crudwell, Wiltshire. He married Ingrid von Rothermann in 1960, by whom he had one son, Martin, and one daughter, Clare. He died at his home in Wiltshire after a short battle with cancer.

== Honours ==
- Commander of the Royal Victorian Order (CVO) – 1972
- Officer of the Most Excellent Order of the British Empire (OBE) – 1985

Government offices
Preceded by David Ford	Secretary for Housing; 1986–1988	Position abolished
