= 2022 Albirex Niigata (S) Women season =

Albirex Niigata (S)
2022 season
- Chairman: Daisuke Korenaga
- Head coach: (Singapore) Nahar Daud
- Women Premier League: 2nd

The 2022 season was Albirex Niigata (S) Women's first season in the top flight of Singapore football, the Women's Premier League.

Their marquee player was former Japan international Kana Kitahara.

== Squad ==
=== Women Squad ===
As of 5 February 2022

Squad No.	Name	Nationality	Date of birth (age)	Previous club	Contract start	Contract end
Goalkeepers
1	Nurul Radiatul	(Singapore)	18 March 2001 (age 25)	(Singapore) Tampines Changkat CSC	2022	2022
25	Maisarah Ramat	(Singapore)	16 October 1993 (age 32)	(Singapore)	2022	2022
96	Lynse Ann Sng	(Singapore)			2022	2022
Defenders
3	Kana Kitahara	(Japan)	7 December 1988 (age 37)	(Japan) MyNavi Sendai	2022	2022
5	Cynthia Taye Shi Ya	(Singapore)	17 February 1984 (age 42)	(Singapore)	2022	2022
6	Nur Shaahidah	(Singapore)	31 May 1999 (age 27)	(Singapore) Arion Women's FC	2022	2022
10	Irsalina Irwan	(Singapore)	1 January 2007 (age 19)	(Singapore)	2022	2022
15	Dini Danisha	(Singapore)	6 April 2003 (age 23)	(Singapore)	2022	2022
17	Nur Emilia Natasha	(Singapore)	15 January 1999 (age 27)	(Singapore) Police SA	2022	2022
18	Wee Xin Yi	(Singapore)	1 February 2000 (age 26)	(Singapore)	2022	2022
23	Marilou Bautista Rubio	(Philippines)	28 September 1975 (age 50)	(Philippines) Far Eastern University	2022	2022
Midfielders
4	Noridah Abdullah	(Singapore)	20 December 1986 (age 39)	(Singapore)	2022	2022
8	Noralinda Wahab	(Singapore)	8 March 1994 (age 32)	(Singapore) Kaki Bukit SC	2022	2022
9	Nadhra Aqilah	(Singapore)	12 April 1994 (age 32)	(Singapore) Tanjong Pagar United Women	2022	2022
12	Chloe Poh Yee Fang	(Singapore)	9 March 1995 (age 31)	(Singapore)	2022	2022
14	Suriati Soony	(Singapore)	26 June 1993 (age 32)	(Singapore) Kaki Bukit SC	2022	2022
16	Nadya Zah	(Singapore)	31 December 1985 (age 40)	(Singapore)	2022	2022
19	Nur Maisarah	(Singapore)	10 November 1998 (age 27)	(Singapore) Home United Women	2022	2022
20	Nurul Unaisah	(Singapore)	12 July 2003 (age 22)	(Singapore)	2022	2022
21	Amirah Syahirah	(Singapore)	28 July 1997 (age 28)	(Singapore) Kaki Bukit SC	2022	2022
22	Siti Nor Aqilah	(Singapore)	17 October 2001 (age 24)	(Singapore) Tampines Changkat CSC	2022	2022
24	Nur Sarah Zu'risqha	(Singapore)	24 July 2006 (age 19)	(Singapore)	2022	2022
30	Wan Nashirah	(Singapore)	4 August 2005 (age 20)	(Singapore)	2022	2022
73	Siti Erma Ellyana	(Singapore)	20 June 1989 (age 37)	(Singapore)	2022	2022
97	Lauren Reese	(Wales)	3 May 1997 (age 29)	(Wales) Wrexham AFC Women	2022	2022
Strikers
2	Nurhidayah Shah	(Singapore)	16 April 1991 (age 35)	(Singapore)	2022	2022
7	Huraizah Ismail	(Singapore)	2 June 1984 (age 42)	(Singapore) Police SA	2022	2022
11	Tina Afrida Nasmi	(Singapore)	5 April 1982 (age 44)	(Singapore)	2022	2022
13	Nuur Fitri Ardilla	(Singapore)	3 February 1999 (age 27)	(Singapore) Lion City Sailors Women	2022	2022
Players who left club during season
15	Nur Danisyah	(Singapore)	17 May 1999 (age 27)	(Singapore)	2022	2022

== Coaching staff ==
Position	Name
Technical Director	(Japan) Kazuaki Yoshinaga
Head Coach (Men)	(Japan) Kazuaki Yoshinaga
Head Coach (Women)	(Singapore) Nahar Daud
Assistant Coach	(Japan) Keiji Shigetomi (Singapore) Jaswinder Singh
Goalkeeper Coach	(Singapore) Fadhil Salim
Sports Trainer	(Japan) Tomoya Ueta
Fitness Coach & U15 Coach	(Japan) Masayuki Kato
Fitness Coach & U19 Coach	
Team Manager (Men)	(Singapore) Dominic Wong
Team Manager (Women)	(Singapore) Tyrus Soo
Physiotherapist	(Singapore) Karen Koh (Singapore) Alison Soh
Kitman	(Singapore) Roy Krishnan
Interpreter	(Japan) Ayumi Nagami

== Transfer ==
=== In ===
Preseason

Position	Player	Transferred from	Team	Ref

Mid-season

Position	Player	Transferred from	Team	Ref
MF	(Japan) Kana Kitahara	(Japan) MyNavi Sendai	Women	Free
MF	(Singapore) Dini Danisha	NA	Women	Free
MF	(Singapore) Wan Nashirah	NA	Women	Free
MF	(Singapore) Siti Erma Ellyana	NA	Women	Free
MF	(England) Lauren Reese	(England) Wrexham AFC Women	Women	Free

Note 1: .

=== Loan In ===
Preseason

Position	Player	Transferred from	Ref

=== Loan Return ===
Preseason

Position	Player	Transferred To / From	Ref

=== Out ===
Preseason

Position	Player	Transferred To	Team	Ref

=== Loan Out ===
Position	Player	Transferred To	Ref

== Friendly ==
=== Pre-season ===
Win Draw Loss

== Team statistics ==
=== Appearances and goals (Women) ===
As of 10 Sept 2022

No.	Pos.	Player	WPL		Total	
No.	Pos.	Player	Apps.	Goals	Apps.	Goals
1	GK	(Singapore) Nurul Radiatul Ain	2+2	0	4	0
2	FW	(Singapore) Nurhidayah Shah	3+7	2	10	2
3	DF	(Japan) Kana Kitahara	4	4	4	4
4	MF	(Singapore) Noridah Abdullah	5+1	0	6	0
5	DF	(Singapore) Cynthia Taye Shi Ya	5+2	0	7	0
6	DF	(Singapore) Nur Shaahidah	10+1	0	11	0
7	MF	(Singapore) Huraizah Ismail	9	5	9	5
8	FW	(Singapore) Noralinda Wahab	4+6	5	10	5
9	FW	(Singapore) Nadhra Aqilah	5	3	5	3
10	DF	(Singapore) Irsalina Irwan	11	1	11	1
11	MF	(Singapore) Tina Afrida Nasmi	10+2	3	12	3
13	MF	(Singapore) Nuur Fitri Ardilla	0+4	0	4	0
14	MF	(Singapore) Suriati Soony	7+4	0	11	0
15	MF	(Singapore) Dini Dannisha	4+1	0	5	0
16	MF	(Singapore) Nadya Zah	2+2	0	4	0
17	DF	(Singapore) Nur Emilia Natasha	7	1	7	1
18	DF	(Singapore) Wee Xin Yi	6	0	6	0
19	MF	(Singapore) Nur Maisarah	0+2	0	2	0
20	DF	(Singapore) Nurul Unaisah	1+6	0	7	0
21	MF	(Singapore) Amirah Syahirah	1+3	1	4	1
22	MF	(Singapore) Siti Nor Aqilah	8+2	3	10	3
23	DF	(Philippines) Marilou Bautista Rubio	4+2	0	1	0
24	MF	(Singapore) Nur Sarah Zu'risqha	6+1	1	7	1
25	GK	(Singapore) Maisarah Ramat	10	0	10	0
30	MF	(Singapore) Wan Nashirah	0+1	1	1	1
73	MF	(Singapore) Siti Erma Ellyana	5+1	0	6	0
96	GK	(Singapore) Lynse Ann Sng	0+1	1	1	1
97	MF	(England) Lauren Reese	2+4	0	6	0
Players who have played this season but had left the club or on loan to other club

== Competition (Women's Premier League) ==
=== Women's Premier League ===
Win Draw Loss

28 May 2022 1	Albirex Niigata (S) (Japan)	1–2	(Singapore) Tanjong Pagar United	Yishun
	Nadhra Aqilah 67'	Report	Manami Fukuzawa 33'; Farah Nurzahirah 55'	Stadium: Yishun Stadium

5 June 2022 2	Lion City Sailors (Singapore)	4–1	(Japan) Albirex Niigata (S)	Yishun
	Nur Izzati Rosni 45' 87'; Dorcas Chu 49'; Madison Telmer 64'	Report	Nadhra Aqilah 77'	Stadium: Yishun Stadium

19 June 2022 3	Albirex Niigata (S) (Japan)	1–1	(Singapore) Balestier Khalsa	Yishun
	Nadhra Aqilah 87'	Report	Nasriah Ibrahim 71'	Stadium: Yishun Stadium

16 July 2022 4	Hougang United (Singapore)	1–5	(Japan) Albirex Niigata (S)	Yishun
	Elizabeth Ong 15'	Report	Amirah Syahirah 17'; Irsalina Irwan 22'; Emilia Natasha 48'; Nurhidayah Shah 74'; Noralinda Wahab 84'	Stadium: Yishun Stadium

23 July 2022 5	Albirex Niigata (S) (Japan)	5–1	(Singapore) Still Aerion	Yishun
	Siti Nor Aqilah 30'; Nurhidayah Shah 35'; Tina Afrida Nasmi 45'; Noralinda Wahab 62' 68'	Report	Joie Teo 38'	Stadium: Yishun Stadium

30 July 2022 6	Tiong Bahru FC (Singapore)	1–2	(Japan) Albirex Niigata (S)	Yishun
		Report	Kana Kitahara 38' 38'	Stadium: Yishun Stadium

6 August 2022 7	Tanjong Pagar United (Singapore)	1–2	(Japan) Albirex Niigata (S)	Yishun
	Nur Adrianna Hazeri 43'	Report	Huraizah Ismail 7'; Kana Kitahara 90+3'	Stadium: Yishun Stadium

14 August 2022 8	Albirex Niigata (S) (Japan)	0–4	(Singapore) Lion City Sailors	Yishun
		Report	Nur Izzati Rosni 1' 57' 64'; Miray Hokotate Altun 40'	Stadium: Yishun Stadium

28 August 2022 9	Balestier Khalsa (Singapore)	0–3	(Japan) Albirex Niigata (S)	Yishun
		Report	Kana Kitahara 38'; Huraizah Ismail 45+3' 86'	Stadium: Yishun Stadium

10 September 2022 10 (Rescheduled)	Albirex Niigata (S) (Japan)	4–1	(Singapore) Hougang United	Yishun
	Nur Sarah Zu'risqha 54'; Noralinda Wahab 54' 60'; Huraizah Ismail 74'	Report	Khue Tran 5'	Stadium: Yishun Stadium

24 September 2022 11 (Rescheduled)	Still Aerion (Singapore)	0–4	(Japan) Albirex Niigata (S)	Yishun
		Report	Siti Nor Aqilah 4' 76'; Lauren Reese 81'; Huraizah Ismail 86'	Stadium: Yishun Stadium

2 October 2022 12 (Rescheduled)	Albirex Niigata (S) (Japan)	3–0	(Singapore) Tiong Bahru FC	Yishun
	Tina Afrida Nasmi 26' 76'; Nurhidayah Shah 90'			Stadium: Yishun Stadium

=== League table ===
Pos	Team	Pld	W	D	L	GF	GA	GD	Pts	Qualification or relegation
1	Lion City Sailors	12	10	2	0	39	3	+36	32	Champion for 2022
2	Albirex Niigata	12	8	1	3	31	16	+15	25	
3	Tanjong Pagar United	12	7	2	3	24	11	+13	23	
4	Tiong Bahru	12	4	3	5	15	12	+3	15	
5	Balestier Khalsa	12	2	5	5	7	19	−12	11	
6	Still Aerion Women	12	3	1	8	11	29	−18	10	
7	Hougang United	12	0	2	10	8	45	−37	2	

Updated to match(es) played on 1 Oct 2022. Source:
