= Zamani Zamri =

Singaporean footballer

Personal information
- Full name: Muhammad Zamani Bin Md Zamri
- Date of birth: 31 May 2001 (age 25)
- Place of birth: Tampines, Singapore
- Height: 1.74 m (5 ft 9 in)
- Positions: Winger; striker; midfielder

Team information
- Current team: Balestier Khalsa
- Number: 77

Youth career
- F17 Football Academy
- Bowen Secondary School
- National Football Academy

Senior career*
| Years | Team | Apps | (Gls) |
| 2019–2020 | Albirex Niigata (S) | 20 | (1) |
| 2020–2022 | Young Lions | 23 | (2) |
| 2022–2023 | Albirex Niigata (S) | 12 | (0) |
| 2024–2025 | Hougang United | 7 | (0) |
| 2025– | Balestier Khalsa | 0 | (0) |

International career^{‡}
| 2019 | Singapore U19 | 9 | (1) |
| 2023 | Singapore U23 | 1 | (0) |
- * Club domestic league appearances and goals as of 21 November 2026 ‡ National team caps and goals as of 15:04, 3 November 2019 (UTC)

Muhammad Zamani Bin Md Zamri (born 31 May 2001), better known as Zamani Zamri or just Zamani, is a Singaporean professional footballer who currently plays either as a winger, striker or midfielder for Singapore Premier League club Balestier Khalsa.

== Club career ==
Zamani started his football career with Albirex Niigata in 2019. He spent one season with Albirex Niigata and moved to Young Lions FC.

== International career ==
Zamani was called up to the Singapore U23 national squad for the 2022 AFF U-23 Championship held in Phnom Penh, Cambodia.

== Career statistics ==
=== Club ===
As of 21 November 2026.

| Club | Season | League | | | Singapore Cup | | Other | | Total | |
| Club | Season | Division | Apps | Goals | Apps | Goals | Apps | Goals | Apps | Goals |
|---|---|---|---|---|---|---|---|---|---|---|
| Albirex Niigata (S) | 2019 | Singapore Premier League | 20 | 1 | 1 | 0 | 1 | 0 | 22 | 1 |
| Albirex Niigata (S) | 2020 | Singapore Premier League | 0 | 0 | 0 | 0 | 0 | 0 | 0 | 0 |
| Albirex Niigata (S) | Total | | 20 | 1 | 1 | 0 | 1 | 0 | 22 | 1 |
| Young Lions | 2020 | Singapore Premier League | 7 | 1 | 0 | 0 | 0 | 0 | 7 | 1 |
| Young Lions | 2021 | Singapore Premier League | 15 | 1 | 0 | 0 | 0 | 0 | 15 | 1 |
| Young Lions | 2022 | Singapore Premier League | 1 | 0 | 0 | 0 | 0 | 0 | 1 | 0 |
| Young Lions | Total | | 23 | 2 | 0 | 0 | 0 | 0 | 23 | 2 |
| Albirex Niigata (S) | 2022 | Singapore Premier League | 10 | 1 | 2 | 0 | 0 | 0 | 12 | 1 |
| Albirex Niigata (S) | 2023 | Singapore Premier League | 2 | 0 | 0 | 0 | 0 | 0 | 2 | 0 |
| Albirex Niigata (S) | Total | | 12 | 1 | 2 | 0 | 0 | 0 | 14 | 1 |
| Hougang United | 2024-25 | Singapore Premier League | 7 | 0 | 0 | 0 | 0 | 0 | 7 | 0 |
| Hougang United | Total | | 7 | 0 | 0 | 0 | 0 | 0 | 7 | 0 |
| Balestier Khalsa | 2025-26 | Singapore Premier League | 0 | 0 | 0 | 0 | 0 | 0 | 0 | 0 |
| Balestier Khalsa | 2026-27 | Singapore Premier League | 0 | 0 | 0 | 0 | 0 | 0 | 0 | 0 |
| Balestier Khalsa | Total | | 0 | 0 | 0 | 0 | 0 | 0 | 0 | 0 |
| Career total | | | 62 | 4 | 3 | 0 | 1 | 0 | 66 | 4 |

== Honours ==
=== Club ===
Albirex Niigata (S)

- Singapore Premier League: 2022, 2023
- Singapore Community Shield: 2023
