= Chuo Gakuin University =

Coordinates: 35°52′58.10″N 140°01′09.02″E

Chuō Gakuen University
- 中央学院大学; Chuō gakuin daigaku
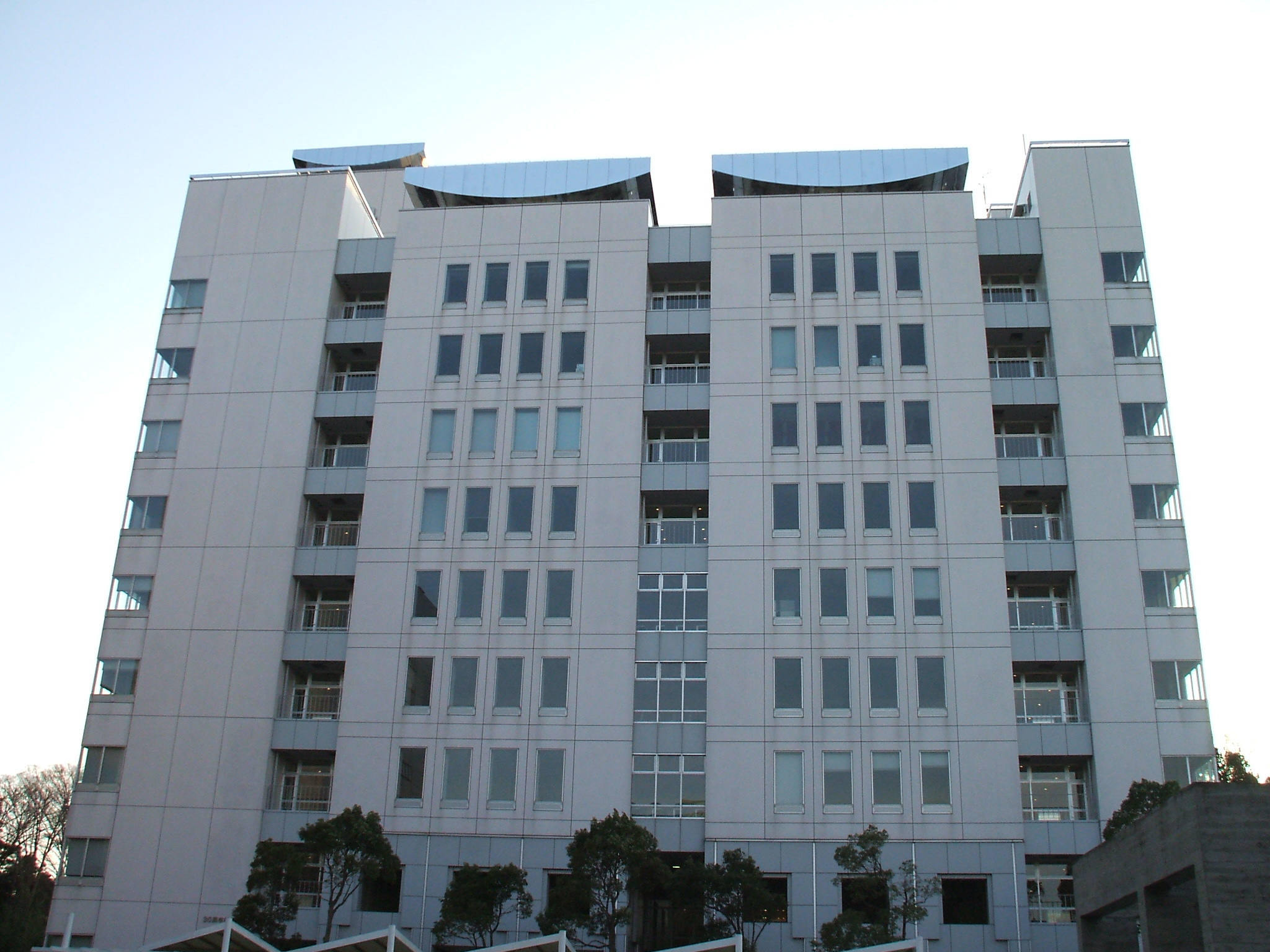
- Type: Private
- Established: 1904
- Location: Abiko, Chiba, Japan
- Website: Official website

Chuō Gakuin University (中央学院大学, Chuō gakuin daigaku) is a private university in Abiko, Chiba, Japan, established in 1966. The predecessor of the school was founded in 1904.

== Alumni ==
- Tatsuya Kawajiri, professional Mixed Martial Artist in the UFC's Featherweight Division
- Mikio Shimoji, a politician
