= Shawal Anuar =

Singaporean footballer

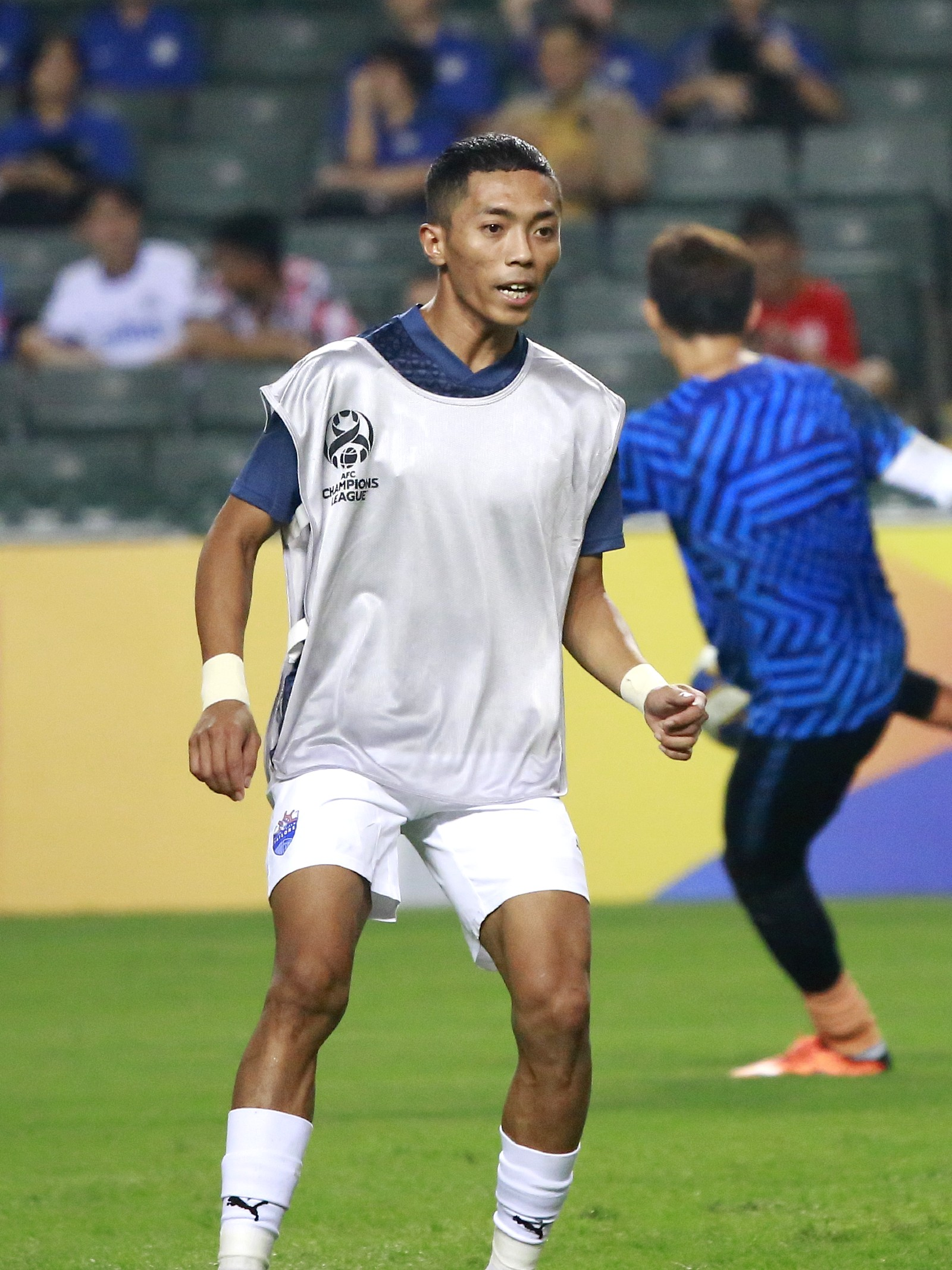
- Shawal warming up before the 2023–24 AFC Champions League match against Jeonbuk Hyundai Motors

Personal information
- Full name: Muhammad Shawal bin Anuar
- Date of birth: 29 April 1991 (age 35)
- Place of birth: Singapore
- Height: 1.68 m (5 ft 6 in)
- Positions: Winger; forward

Team information
- Current team: Lion City Sailors
- Number: 7

Senior career*
Years	Team	Apps	(Gls)
2013	Keppel Monaco		
2014–2019	Geylang International	89	(30)
2020–2022	Hougang United	55	(18)
2023–	Lion City Sailors	74	(37)

International career^{‡}
2016–	Singapore	60	(20)
- * Club domestic league appearances and goals as of 1 November 2026 ‡ National team caps and goals as of 28 September 2026

Muhammad Shawal bin Anuar (born 29 April 1991) is a Singaporean professional footballer who plays either as a winger or a forward for Singapore Premier League club Lion City Sailors and the Singapore national team.

Shawal also holds the record for scoring the fastest goal in the history of the AFC Champions League Two in 18 seconds.

== Club career ==
=== Geylang International ===
In 2014, Shawal signed a contract with Geylang International earning $500 a month being signed for six months to the team's reserve Prime League squad, Shawal also managed to appear for the senior team, clocking in 69 minutes of football in the 2014 S.League season.

In the following year, Shawal received his first professional contract earning $1,800 which he decided to quit his odd jobs and turn his full attention to football. Shawal went on to have a solid full debut season for the Eagles in the 2015 S.League, scoring 4 goals in 22 appearances, helping his team finish 8th in the league.

Shawal built on his debut season and helped his team win the 2016 Singapore League Cup Plate, Geylang's first trophy since 2009, while earning a call-up to the national team. His performances in 2016 prompted his head coach Hasrin Jailani to identify him as one of the players to watch for in the 2017 S.League season.

Shawal started in the season open against Hougang United and scored his first goal of the season in the following match, helping his team to 3 points over Balestier Khalsa. He got his second of the season in a 2–0 win over the Garena Young Lions in Geylang's 5th game of the season.

As the end of the 2018 Singapore Premier League season, Shawal has notched 22 goals in 77 appearances for Geylang International in his time with the club.

==== Matsumoto Yamaga trials ====
Shawal started the 2017 season on a good note. Following Geylang International and Matsumoto Yamaga signing of a MOU in November 2016, Shawal, together with fellow winger Gabriel Quak, were selected to go on a one-week trial with the J2 League side. Both players were not offered a contract, with the Japanese side saying that the pair was good enough to play in the J3 League with potential to feature in the top-tier J.League club if they fulfill their potential.

=== Hougang United ===
After scoring 9 goals over 16 appearances with Geylang International in the 2019 Singapore Premier League and also being named in the 2019 Singapore Premier League Team of the Year, Shawal was snapped up by Hougang United for the 2020 Singapore Premier League season signing a two years contract.

Shawal ended his career at Hougang with 14 goals and 10 assists, helping them win their first ever silverware in the form of the 2022 Singapore Cup.

=== Lion City Sailors ===
On 21 December 2022, Shawal was unveiled officially as part of the Lion City Sailors squad ahead of the 2023 Singapore Premier League season.

On 26 July 2023, as the Sailors played their first match in their history at the Singapore National Stadium against Tottenham Hotspurs in a friendly match, Shawal scored first which give Lion City Sailors the lead against the English giants which caused an upset to the away fans and a roaring crowd from the Sailors fans. Shawal becomes the third Singaporean to score against an English team since Fandi Ahmad against Nottingham Forest in 1995 and Indra Sahdan against Manchester United in 2001. On 21 October, Shawal scored his first senior hat-trick in a 7–0 win against Tanjong Pagar United in the 2023 Singapore Cup. During the 2023–24 AFC Champions League match against Korean club, Jeonbuk Hyundai Motors on 8 November, Shawal provided the assist twice to Richairo Živković who sets up the goal to secure a 2–0 home win for Lion City Sailors. On 23 November, Shawal was named in the 2023 Singapore Premier League Team of the Year. On 9 December, he scored during the 2023 Singapore Cup final against his former club to lift the trophy. On 4 May 2024, Shawal scored the opening goal during the 2024 Singapore Community Shield in which Lion City Sailors went on to win the match 2–0

In the 2024–25 season, Shawal was shifted to play in the striker role where on 4 May 2024, Shawal scored the opening goal during the 2024 Singapore Community Shield in which Lion City Sailors went on to win the match 2–0. Shawal would than go on to scored in 4 consecutive league matches. During the 2024–25 AFC Champions League Two match against Thailand club Port on 30 October, Shawal scored a brace in within 3 minutes in the 14th and 17th minute of the match which then secured a 3–1 away win for Lion City Sailors. During the round of 16 away fixtures in the 2024–25 AFC Champions League Two against Thailand club Muangthong United, Shawal set a record for the fastest goal in the competition history by scoring in 18 seconds which beats the previous record of 26 seconds achieved by Musa Barrow. Despite Maxime Lestienne's equaliser in the 91st minute of the 2025 AFC Champions League Two final against Sharjah, the Sailors finished as a runner-up after conceding in the 97th minute to finish the game in a 1–2 defeat. Shawal finished the campaign with 8 goals, and was the second top scorer of the campaign.

== International career ==
Shawal was called up for the first time to the senior team by the Singapore national team head coach V. Sundramoorthy in 2016 for matches against Malaysia and Hong Kong. He made his international debut against Hong Kong in the 79th minute, replacing Gabriel Quak.

Shawal scored his first international goal, in his second international cap, against Afghanistan. He scored in the 46th minute to equalise for the Lions. However, Singapore fell to an eventual 2–1 defeat.

He scored his third and fourth international goal in a 3–1 win over Maldives in a final friendly game ahead of the 2022 AFF Championship. Shawal then scored his fifth international goal in his next game, coolly slotting in a 74th-minute winner, from a Zaiful Nizam long punt, to help the Lions to win their 2022 AFF Championship opening game against Myanmar. He notched his sixth goal in Singapore's 2–0 win over Laos in the 2022 AFF Championship, nicking the ball from Laos goalkeeper, Keo-Oudone Souvannasangso in the 94th minute of the game.

As the national team returned to the Singapore National Stadium after 15 months, On 16 June and 18 June 2023, he scored in both the friendly against Oceania continent, Papua New Guinea and Solomon Islands which both games resulted in a draw. In the second legged match in the first round of the 2026 FIFA World Cup qualification, he scored the only goal in the match against Guam to secure the win which see Singapore advanced to the second round.

On 21 November 2023, Shawal scored a goal in the second-round of the 2026 FIFA World Cup qualification group stage fixtures against Thailand after receiving a pass from teammate Song Ui-young. During the 2026 FIFA World Cup qualification match against China on 21 March 2024, he assisted teammate, Jacob Mahler who then scored the equaliser goal in a 2–2 draw.

On 14 December 2024 during the 2024 ASEAN Championship against Timor-Leste. Shawal came on as a substitution and scored a brace giving Singapore a 3–0 win. In the next match against Thailand 3 days later, Shawal scored his fourth goal in the tournament to become the top scorer of the tournament.

On 18 November 2025, Shawal netted a crucial equaliser chipping the ball above Wang Zhenpeng against Hong Kong in a winner-takes-all tie, as Singapore went on to win 2–1 and secured qualification to the 2027 AFC Asian Cup.

== Personal life ==
Shawal studied at Kent Ridge Secondary School where he played field hockey and badminton but chose football as a co-curricular activity (CCA).

== Career statistics ==
=== Club ===
As of match played 30 May 2026. Caps and goals may not be correct.

Club	Season	S.League/ Singapore Premier League		Singapore Cup		Singapore League Cup Community Shield		AFF Competition		Asia		Total	
Club	Season	Apps	Goals	Apps	Goals	Apps	Goals	Apps	Goals	Apps	Goals	Apps	Goals
Geylang International	2014	2	0	0	0	0	0	0	0	—		4	0
Geylang International	2015	22	4	3	0	3	0	0	0	—		26	3
Geylang International	2016	18	1	2	0	5	2	0	0	—		24	3
Geylang International	2017	18	10	1	0	3	0	0	0	—		23	9
Geylang International	2018	15	7	0	0	0	0	0	0	—		15	7
Geylang International	2019	14	8	2	1	0	0	0	0	—		16	9
Geylang International	Total	89	30	8	1	11	2	0	0	0	0	108	31
Hougang United	2020	13	4	0	0	1	0	0	0	3	0	17	4
Hougang United	2021	18	3	0	0	0	0	0	0	0	0	18	3
Hougang United	2022	24	11	6	3	0	0	0	0	3	0	32	14
Hougang United	Total	55	18	6	3	1	0	0	0	6	0	67	21
Lion City Sailors	2023	21	10	6	6	0	0	0	0	5	0	32	16
Lion City Sailors	2024–25	24	15	0	0	1	1	4	0	8	7	37	23
Lion City Sailors	2025–26	20	7	3	2	1	0	5	1	6	1	35	11
Lion City Sailors	2026–27	0	0	0	0	0	0	0	0	0	0	0	0
Lion City Sailors	Total	65	32	9	8	2	1	9	1	19	8	104	50
Career total		203	73	23	12	14	2	10	2	25	8	274	96

== International statistics ==
=== International goals ===
No	Date	Venue	Opponent	Score	Result	Competition
1	23 March 2017	Saoud bin Abdulrahman Stadium, Doha, Qatar	Afghanistan	1–1	1–2	Friendly
2	29 March 2022	National Stadium, Kallang, Singapore	Philippines	2–0	2–0	2022 FAS Tri-Nations Series
3	17 December 2022	Jalan Besar Stadium, Jalan Besar, Singapore	Maldives	2–1	3–1	Friendly
4	17 December 2022	Jalan Besar Stadium, Jalan Besar, Singapore	Maldives	3–1	3–1	Friendly
5	24 December 2022	Jalan Besar Stadium, Jalan Besar, Singapore	Myanmar	3–2	3–2	2022 AFF Championship
6	27 December 2022	New Laos National Stadium, Vientiane, Laos	Laos	2–0	2–0	2022 AFF Championship
7	16 June 2023	National Stadium, Kallang, Singapore	Papua New Guinea	2–1	2–2	Friendly
8	18 June 2023	National Stadium, Kallang, Singapore	Solomon Islands	1–0	1–1	Friendly
9	12 September 2023	Bishan Stadium, Bishan, Singapore	Chinese Taipei	3–1	3–1	Friendly
10	17 October 2023	GFA National Training Center, Dededo, Guam	Guam	1–0	1–0	2026 FIFA World Cup qualification
11	21 November 2023	National Stadium, Kallang, Singapore	Thailand	1–1	1–3	2026 FIFA World Cup qualification
12	14 November 2024	National Stadium, Kallang, Singapore	Myanmar	2–2	3–2	Friendly
13	18 November 2024	National Stadium, Kallang, Singapore	Chinese Taipei	2–3	2–3	Friendly
14	11 December 2024	National Stadium, Kallang, Singapore	Cambodia	2–0	2–1	2024 ASEAN Championship
15	14 December 2024	Hàng Đẫy Stadium, Hanoi, Vietnam	Timor-Leste	2–0	3–0	2024 ASEAN Championship
16	14 December 2024	Hàng Đẫy Stadium, Hanoi, Vietnam	Timor-Leste	3–0	3–0	2024 ASEAN Championship
17	17 December 2024	National Stadium, Kallang, Singapore	Thailand	1–0	2–4	2024 ASEAN Championship
18	18 November 2025	Kai Tak Sports Park, Kowloon, Hong Kong	Hong Kong	1–1	2–1	2027 AFC Asian Cup qualification
19	24 July 2026	Morodok Techo National Stadium, Phnom Penh, Cambodia	Cambodia	1–0	2–1	2026 ASEAN Championship

== Honours ==
Geylang International

- Singapore League Cup: 2016

Hougang United

- Singapore Cup: 2022

Lion City Sailors

- AFC Champions League Two runner-up: 2024–25
- Singapore Premier League: 2024–25, 2025–26
- Singapore Cup: 2023, 2024–25, 2025–26
- Singapore Community Shield: 2024; runner-up: 2025

Individual

- Singapore Premier League Team of the Year: 2019, 2023, 2024–25
- Singapore Premier League Player of the Month: June 2019
- Singapore Premier League Goal of the Year: 2024–25
