= Pedro Bortoluzo =

Brazilian footballer (born 1996)

Personal information
- Full name: Pedro Gomes Bortoluzo
- Date of birth: 17 July 1996 (age 30)
- Place of birth: Fernandópolis, Brazil
- Height: 1.86 m (6 ft 1 in)
- Positions: Striker; winger

Team information
- Current team: Santa Cruz Futebol Clube

Youth career
- 2009–2016: São Paulo

Senior career*
Years	Team	Apps	(Gls)
2016–2020	São Paulo	11	(0)
2017	→ Paraná (loan)	5	(0)
2018	→ Guarani (loan)	10	(2)
2019	→ Criciúma (loan)	13	(0)
2020	→ Votuporanguense (loan)	10	(5)
2020–2021	Oliveirense	23	(3)
2022	Hougang United	30	(23)
2023	Portuguesa	2	(2)
- * Club domestic league appearances and goals as of 14:51, 4 December 2023 (UTC)

Pedro Gomes Bortoluzo (born 17 July 1996), better known as Pedro or Bortoluzo, is a Brazilian professional footballer who plays as a striker or winger for Campeonato Brasileiro Série C club Santa Cruz Futebol Clube. Bortoluzo is known for his finishing, aerial ability and eye for goal.

== Club career ==
=== São Paulo ===
Born in Florianópolis, Bortoluzo joined the youth setup of São Paulo in 2009. He went on to win 2015 Copa do Brasil Sub-20 and 2016 U-20 Copa Libertadores with the youth side. Ahead of the 2016 season, he was promoted to the senior team.

On 3 July 2016, Bortoluzo made his first team debut, scoring a goal against Ituano in a 2–1 defeat, in Copa Paulista. On 24 July, he made his Série A debut, in a 1–0 defeat against Grêmio.

On 24 November 2018, Bortoluzo won the Campeonato Brasileiro de Aspirantes with the under-23 side, and scored a goal in the second leg of the final match against Internacional.

=== Loan to Paraná ===
On 21 March 2017, Bortoluzo was loaned out to Paraná. After featuring rarely, he left the side on 29 June.

=== Guarani ===
On 28 December 2017, Bortoluzo was loaned out to Guarani for the upcoming season. On 13 April, he scored his first goal for the club in a 2–1 defeat against Fortaleza. He rescinded the deal and returned to his parent club on 11 June 2018.

=== Criciúma ===
On 8 January 2019, he was loaned out to Criciúma.

=== Oliveirense ===
In 2020, Bortoluzo joined Liga Portugal 2 club, Oliveirense. He couldn't help the club as they fell off at the bottom of the table thus getting them relegated to the 2021–22 Liga 3.

=== Hougang United ===
After 5 months without a club, Bortoluzo signed for Hougang United for the 2022 Singapore Premier League season On 27 February 2022, he scored his first goal for the club on his club debut against the 2021 league champions, Lion City Sailors but injured his thigh in Hougang's second game of the season against Tanjong Pagar United and was ruled out for a few weeks. He returned from a month injury and featured in his club league match against Young Lions on 10 April 2022. He had a slow start after that but burst into life during Hougang's 2022 AFC Cup campaign in June where he netted four goals in three games helping the club to win against Cambodian side, Phnom Penh Crown and Laos side, Young Elephants in which the final game was crucial facing Vietnamese side, Viettel and netting twice but it wasn't enough to put them as league leaders as the club bowed out from the AFC Cup as runners-up in the group. Bortoluzo continued his fine form where on 13 July 2023, he scored his first career hat-trick in league match against Tampines Rovers. He went on to score in the next two consecutive games against Tanjong Pagar United and Geylang International in a matter of 9 days apart. On 5 August 2022, Bortoluzo scored a brace against Albirex Niigata Singapore which ended in a 3–3 draw. Bortoluzo then went on to score another three consecutive goals in late August/early September. On 15 October 2022, he scored his second hat-trick of the season against Young Lions in a 5–3 away win. Bortoluzo guided Hougang United to win the 2022 Singapore Cup which was their first ever piece of silverware in the club history.

=== Portuguesa ===
On 3 January 2023, Bortoluzo returned to home to joined Campeonato Paulista club, Portuguesa playing in the São Paulo's top professional football league. On 14 January 2023, he make his debut for the club against Botafogo-SP.

Bortoluzo suffered an injury on his debut, and played only one further match before missing out the entire Paulistão. Back to the 2023 Copa Paulista, he scored twice in five matches during the competition before leaving the club on 30 November, as his contract expired.

== Career statistics ==
As of 4 December 2023

Club	Season	National League			State League		Cup		Continental		Other		Total	
Club	Season	Division	Apps	Goals	Apps	Goals	Apps	Goals	Apps	Goals	Apps	Goals	Apps	Goals
São Paulo	2016	Série A	10	0	0	0	0	0	0	0	5 (Note: Appearance(s) in Copa Paulista)	2	15	2
São Paulo	2017	Série A	0	0	—		—		—		6	2	6	2
São Paulo	2018	Série A	1	0	—		0	0	—		—		1	0
São Paulo	Total		11	0	0	0	0	0	0	0	11	4	22	4
Paraná (loan)	2017	Série B	2	0	3	0	4	0	—		—		9	0
Guarani (loan)	2018	Série B	2	1	8	1	0	0	—		—		10	2
Criciúma (loan)	2019	Série B	3	0	10	0	2	0	—		—		15	0
Votuporanguense (loan)	2020	Paulista A2	—		10	5	—		—		—		10	5
Oliveirense	2020–21	Liga Portugal 2	23	3	—		1	0	—		0	0	24	3
Hougang United	2022	Singapore Premier League	23	18	—		4	1	3 (Note: Appearance(s) in AFC Champions League)	4	—		30	23
Portuguesa	2023	Paulista	—		2	0	—		—		5	2	7	2
Career total			64	22	33	6	11	1	3	4	16	6	127	39

== Honours ==
Hougang United

- Singapore Cup: 2022
