= Keito Hariya =

Japanese footballer

Personal information
- Full name: Keito Hariya
- Date of birth: 18 May 2003 (age 23)
- Place of birth: Tokyo, Japan
- Height: 1.78 m (5 ft 10 in)
- Positions: Defender; midfielder

Team information
- Current team: Geylang International
- Number: 18

Youth career
- Blue Fighters SC
- Arsenal SS Ichikawa
- 2019–2021: Ichiritsu Funabashi High School

Senior career*
Years	Team	Apps	(Gls)
2022–2023	Albirex Niigata (S)	40	(0)
2024–	Geylang International	0	(0)
- * Club domestic league appearances and goals as of 22:16, 8 January 2024 (UTC)

Keito Hariya (針谷 奎人, Hariya Keito; born 18 May 2003) is a Japanese professional footballer who plays primarily as a centre-back for Singapore Premier League club Geylang International. Primarily a centre-back, he is also capable of playing either as defensive-midfielder or central-midfielder.

== Career statistics ==
=== Club ===
As of 19 February 2022.

Club	Season	League			Cup		Other		Total	
Club	Season	Division	Apps	Goals	Apps	Goals	Apps	Goals	Apps	Goals
Albirex Niigata (S)	2022	Singapore Premier League	27	0	6	0	1 (Note: Appearances in the Singapore Community Shield)	0	34	0
Albirex Niigata (S)	2023	Singapore Premier League	13	0	1	0	0	0	14	0
Albirex Niigata (S)	Total		40	0	7	0	1	0	48	0
Geylang International	2024–25	Singapore Premier League	23	0	2	1	0	0	25	1
Geylang International	Total		23	0	2	1	0	0	25	1
Career total			63	0	9	1	1	0	73	1

== Honours ==
=== Club ===
- Singapore Premier League: 2022, 2023
- Singapore Community Shield: 2023
