= Reo Kunimoto =

Japanese footballer

Personal information
- Full name: Reo Kunimoto
- Date of birth: 1 September 2001 (age 25)
- Place of birth: Kanagawa, Japan
- Height: 1.87 m (6 ft 2 in)
- Position: Defender

Team information
- Current team: Rockdale Ilinden
- Number: 4

Youth career
- SCH FC
- Shoot JYFC
- Suerte FC Chigasaki
- 2017–2019: Gyosei International School

Senior career*
Years	Team	Apps	(Gls)
2020-2023	Renofa Yamaguchi FC	5	(0)
2021–2022	→ Albirex Niigata (S) (loan)	37	(2)
2023–2024	Tegevajaro Miyazaki	1	(0)
2024	Phnom Penh Crown	9	(0)
2024–2025	Taiwan Steel	1	(0)
2026–	Rockdale Ilinden	23	(0)
- * Club domestic league appearances and goals as of 2 August 2026

Reo Kunimoto (国本 玲央, Kunimoto Reo) (born 1 September 2001) is a Japanese footballer currently playing for Rockdale Ilinden in the Australian NPL NSW.

== Club career ==
Albirex Niigata (S)

He was loan to Albirex Niigata (S) for two seasons which he won the 2022 Singapore Premier League.

Renofa Yamaguchi

He returned to his parent club after a successful season in Singapore. He was given the no,41 jersey for the 2023 J2 League season. On 8 April 2023, He make his debut for the club against Tochigi SC. He went on to make another 2 consecutive appearances for the club.

Phnom Penh Crown

In 2024, he signed for Phnom Penh Crown in the Cambodian Premier League.

== Career statistics ==
=== Club ===
As of 2 January 2022.

Club	Season	League			Cup		Other		Total	
Club	Season	Division	Apps	Goals	Apps	Goals	Apps	Goals	Apps	Goals
Renofa Yamaguchi	2021	J2 League	0	0	0	0	0	0	0	0
Renofa Yamaguchi	2022	J2 League	0	0	0	0	0	0	0	0
Renofa Yamaguchi	2023	J2 League	5	0	1	0	0	0	6	0
Renofa Yamaguchi	Total		5	0	1	0	0	0	6	0
Albirex Niigata (S) (loan)	2021	SPL	20	2	0	0	0	0	20	2
Albirex Niigata (S) (loan)	2022	SPL	17	0	2	0	0	0	19	0
Albirex Niigata (S) (loan)	Total		37	2	2	0	0	0	39	2
Tegevajaro Miyazaki	2023	J3 League	1	0	0	0	0	0	1	0
Tegevajaro Miyazaki	Total		1	0	0	0	0	0	1	0
Phnom Penh Crown FC	2024–25	Cambodian Premier League	0	0	0	0	0	0	0	0
Phnom Penh Crown FC	Total		0	0	0	0	0	0	0	0
Career total			43	2	3	0	0	0	46	2

== Honours ==
Albirex Niigata (S)

- Singapore Premier League: 2022
