= Dominic Wong =

Hong Kong official

Dominic Wong GBS, OBE, JP
- 黃星華

Secretary for Housing
- In office 15 December 1994 – 12 April 2002
- Governor: Chris Patten (until 1997)
- Chief Executive: Tung Chee-hwa (since 1997)
- Preceded by: John Rawling Todd
- Succeeded by: Michael Suen (as Secretary for Housing, Planning and Lands)

Personal details
- Born: 13 April 1942
- Died: May 2012 (aged 70)

Dominic Wong Shing-wah (Chinese: 黃星華; 13 April 1942 – May 2012) was an official in the Hong Kong Government. Wong retired in 2002 from the Hong Kong Government as Secretary for Housing, after a 40-year career in public service.

== Career ==
In 1962, Wong joined the Hong Kong Government and served in the Certificated Master, Executive Officer and Trade Officer Grades. In 1973, Wong became an Administrative Officer. In 1996, he was promoted to the rank of Director of Bureau.

Wong had served in various policy bureaus and departments. Senior positions held by Wong include: Deputy Secretary for the Civil Service (January 1984 – January 1988); Deputy Secretary for Education and Manpower (January 1988 – September 1989); Postmaster General (September 1989 – May 1992) and Director of Education (July 1992 – December 1994). He began his position as Secretary for Housing in December 1994 and continued to hold the position after the handover of Hong Kong in July 1997.

During his tenure as Housing Secretary, his long-term strategic planning of housing was praised as forward-looking, and shortened the queuing time for public housing from 5 to 6 years to 3 years. He retired in 2002,and died of disease in early May 2012 after being diagnosed with laryngeal cancer.

== Awards ==
- Gold Bauhinia Star (2000)
- Honorary President of the Society for the Promotion of Hospice Care and Honorary President of the International Institute of Management
