= Masahiro Sugita =

Japanese footballer

Personal information
- Full name: Masahiro Sugita
- Date of birth: 24 November 1999 (age 26)
- Place of birth: Aichi, Japan
- Height: 1.64 m (5 ft 5 in)
- Position: Midfielder

Team information
- Current team: Tanjong Pagar United
- Number: 18

Youth career
- –2014: Nagoya S.S.
- 2015–2017: Nagoya Grampus

College career
Years	Team	Apps	(Gls)
2018–2021	Waseda University		

Senior career*
Years	Team	Apps	(Gls)
2022	Albirex Niigata (S)	27	(8)
2023–2026	Balestier Khalsa	66	(12)
2026–	Tanjong Pagar United		

International career
- Japan U16
2017	Japan U18	2	(2)
- * Club domestic league appearances and goals as of 17:04, 15 May 2026 (UTC)

Masahiro Sugita (杉田 将宏, Sugita Masahiro; born 24 November 1999) is a Japanese footballer who plays as a midfielder for Singapore Premier League club Tanjong Pagar United.

== Club career ==
=== Albirex Niigata Singapore ===
In January 2022, Sugita moved to Singapore to join Albirex Niigata (S) after his graduation from Waseda University. In his first season, he played a pivotal role in the team's success and his contributions helped the club secure the 2022 Singapore Premier League title.

=== Balestier Khalsa ===
After a year in Singapore, Sugita moved to another Singapore Premier League club Balestier Khalsa on 12 January 2023. He make his debut on 26 February against Hougang United. Sugita scored his first goal for the club on 16 April in a 4–2 win over Tanjong Pagar United. On 10 July 2025, he extended his contract for another season.

== International career ==
Sugita represented the Japan U16 and Japan U18 team at international level. He made his debut for Japan U18 on 10 August 2017 against Chile U18.

== Career statistics ==
=== Club ===
As of 20 Sept 2026.

Club	Season	League			Cup		Other		Total	
Club	Season	Division	Apps	Goals	Apps	Goals	Apps	Goals	Apps	Goals
Albirex Niigata (S)	2022	Singapore Premier League	27	8	5	1	1 (Note: Appearances in the Singapore Community Shield)	0	33	9
Albirex Niigata (S)	Total		27	8	5	1	1	0	33	9
Balestier Khalsa	2023	Singapore Premier League	20	5	3	0	0	0	22	5
Balestier Khalsa	2024–25	Singapore Premier League	26	2	3	1	0	0	29	3
Balestier Khalsa	2025–26	Singapore Premier League	20	5	6	0	0	0	26	5
Balestier Khalsa	Total		66	12	12	1	0	0	78	13
Tanjong Pagar United	2026–27	SPL	2	0	0	0	0	0	2	0
Tanjong Pagar United	Total		2	0	0	0	0	0	2	0
Career total			95	20	17	2	1	0	113	22

== International Statistics ==
=== U18 International caps ===
No	Date	Venue	Opponent	Result	Competition
1	10 August 2017	Fujieda-sogo Stadium, Japan	Chile	1–2 (lost)	SBS Cup
2	13 August 2017	Kusanagi Stadium, Japan	Czech Republic	2–1 (won)	SBS Cup

== Honours ==
=== Club ===
• Singapore Premier League: 2022
