= Faizal Roslan =

Singaporean association football player

Personal information
- Full name: Mohammad Faizal bin Roslan
- Date of birth: 30 May 1995 (age 31)
- Place of birth: Singapore
- Height: 1.81 m (5 ft 11 in)
- Positions: Centre-back; full-back

Team information
- Current team: Tanjong Pagar United
- Number: 15

Youth career
- 2009: Singapore Sports School
- 2010: Woodlands Wellington
- 2011: Home United
- 2012: Warriors FC
- 2013–2014: Singapore Cubs

Senior career*
Years	Team	Apps	(Gls)
2015–2017	Young Lions	0	(0)
2018–2021	Lion City Sailors	18	(0)
2021	→ Geylang International (loan)	15	(1)
2022	Geylang International	29	(1)
2023–2026	Tanjong Pagar United	79	(9)
2026–	Gymkhana Gaulois		

International career^{‡}
2015–2018	Singapore U22		
2016–2018	Singapore U23		
- * Club domestic league appearances and goals as of 14 May 2020 (UTC) ‡ National team caps and goals as of 11 February 2023

Mohammad Faizal bin Roslan is a Singaporean professional footballer who plays either as a centre-back or full-back, and was a former captain for Singapore Premier League club Tanjong Pagar United. In his youth day, he had played for various clubs, from Woodlands Wellington to Home United to Warriors FC etc.

Faizal Roslan announced his retirement from professional football on 30 July 2026. He is currently playing for amateur club Gymkhana Gaulois in the Singapore Football League.

== Career statistics ==
As of 18 May 2026

Club	Season	S.League		Singapore Cup		League Cup		Asia		Total	
Club	Season	Apps	Goals	Apps	Goals	Apps	Goals	Apps	Goals	Apps	Goals
Young Lions FC	2015	?	?	0	0	0	0	0	0	?	?
Young Lions FC	2016	?	?	0	0	0	0	0	0	?	?
Young Lions FC	2017	18	0	0	0	0	0	0	0	18	0
Young Lions FC	Total	18	0	0	0	0	0	0	0	18	0
Home United	2018	24	2	5	0	-	-	9	1	39	3
Home United	2019	24	1	3	0	-	-	6	0	33	1
Home United	Total	48	3	8	0	-	-	15	1	72	4
Lion City Sailors	2020	8	0	0	0	-	-	0	0	8	0
Lion City Sailors	Total	8	0	0	0	-	-	0	0	8	0
Geylang International	2021	15	1	0	0	-	-	0	0	15	1
Geylang International	2022	26	1	3	0	-	-	0	0	29	1
Geylang International	Total	41	2	3	0	-	-	0	0	44	2
Tanjong Pagar United	2023	23	3	3	0	-	-	0	0	26	3
Tanjong Pagar United	2024–25	28	4	4	2	-	-	0	0	32	6
Tanjong Pagar United	2025–26	17	0	4	0	-	-	0	0	21	0
Tanjong Pagar United	Total	68	7	11	2	-	-	0	0	79	9
Career total		183	12	22	2	0	0	15	1	221	15

Club	Season	League		FA Cup		Total	
Club	Season	Apps	Goals	Apps	Goals	Apps	Goals
Gymkhana Gaulois	2026-27						
Career total							
