= Jun Kobayashi =

Japanese footballer (born 1999)

Personal information
- Date of birth: 7 May 1999 (age 27)
- Place of birth: Osaka, Japan
- Height: 1.88 m (6 ft 2 in)
- Position: Centre-back

Team information
- Current team: Balestier Khalsa
- Number: 15

Youth career
- Seiei Gakuen SS
- 2012–2017: Cerezo Osaka

College career
Years	Team	Apps	(Gls)
2018–2021	Kwansei Gakuin University		

Senior career*
Years	Team	Apps	(Gls)
2017	Cerezo Osaka U-23	13	(2)
2022	Albirex Niigata (S)	27	(4)
2023–2025	Young Lions	54	(6)
2025	Kochi United	1	(0)
2026	Nobeoka Agata	5	(0)
2026-	Balestier Khalsa	0	(0)
- * Club domestic league appearances and goals as of 21 November 2026

Jun Kobayashi (小林 洵, Kobayashi Jun; born 7 May 1999) is a Japanese professional footballer who currently plays as a centre-back for Singapore Premier League club Balestier Khalsa.

== Club career ==
=== Cerezo Osaka U-23 ===
Jun started his career playing with Cerezo Osaka U-23 in the J3 League. He ended the season with 2 goals in 13 appearances.

=== Albirex Niigata Singapore ===
On 30 December 2021, Jun joined Singapore Premier League outfits, Albirex Niigata (S), the satellite team of Japan club, Albirex Niigata. Jun was then named as the club captain in the 2022 season where he helped the club to win the 2022 Singapore Premier League title.

=== Young Lions ===
On 28 January 2023, Jun joined the Young Lions, a Singaporean developmental club which aims to expose young players to top-level competition. He is joined by Kan Kobayashi who together become the first foreigners to play for the Young Lions since 2016.

=== Kochi United ===
On 15 June 2025, Jun returned to Japan to joined J3 League club Kochi United ahead of their 2025 season campaign.

== Career statistics ==
=== Club ===
As of 21 November 2026.

Club	Season	League			Cup		Other		Total	
Club	Season	Division	Apps	Goals	Apps	Goals	Apps	Goals	Apps	Goals
Cerezo Osaka U-23	2017	J3 League	13	2	0	0	0	0	13	2
Albirex Niigata (S)	2022	Singapore Premier League	27	4	5	0	1	0	33	4
Young Lions	2023	Singapore Premier League	24	3	3	0	0	0	27	3
Young Lions	2024–25	Singapore Premier League	30	3	4	1	0	0	34	4
Young Lions	Total		54	6	7	1	0	0	61	7
Kochi United	2025	J3 League	1	0	0	0	0	0	1	0
Nobeoka Agata	2026	Kyushu Soccer League	5	0	0	0	0	0	5	0
Balestier Khalsa	2026-27	Singapore Premier League	0	0	0	0	–		0	0
Career total			100	12	12	1	1	0	113	13

== Honours ==
=== Club ===
Albirex Niigata (S):

• Singapore Premier League: 2022
