= Kan Kobayashi =

Japanese footballer (born 1999)

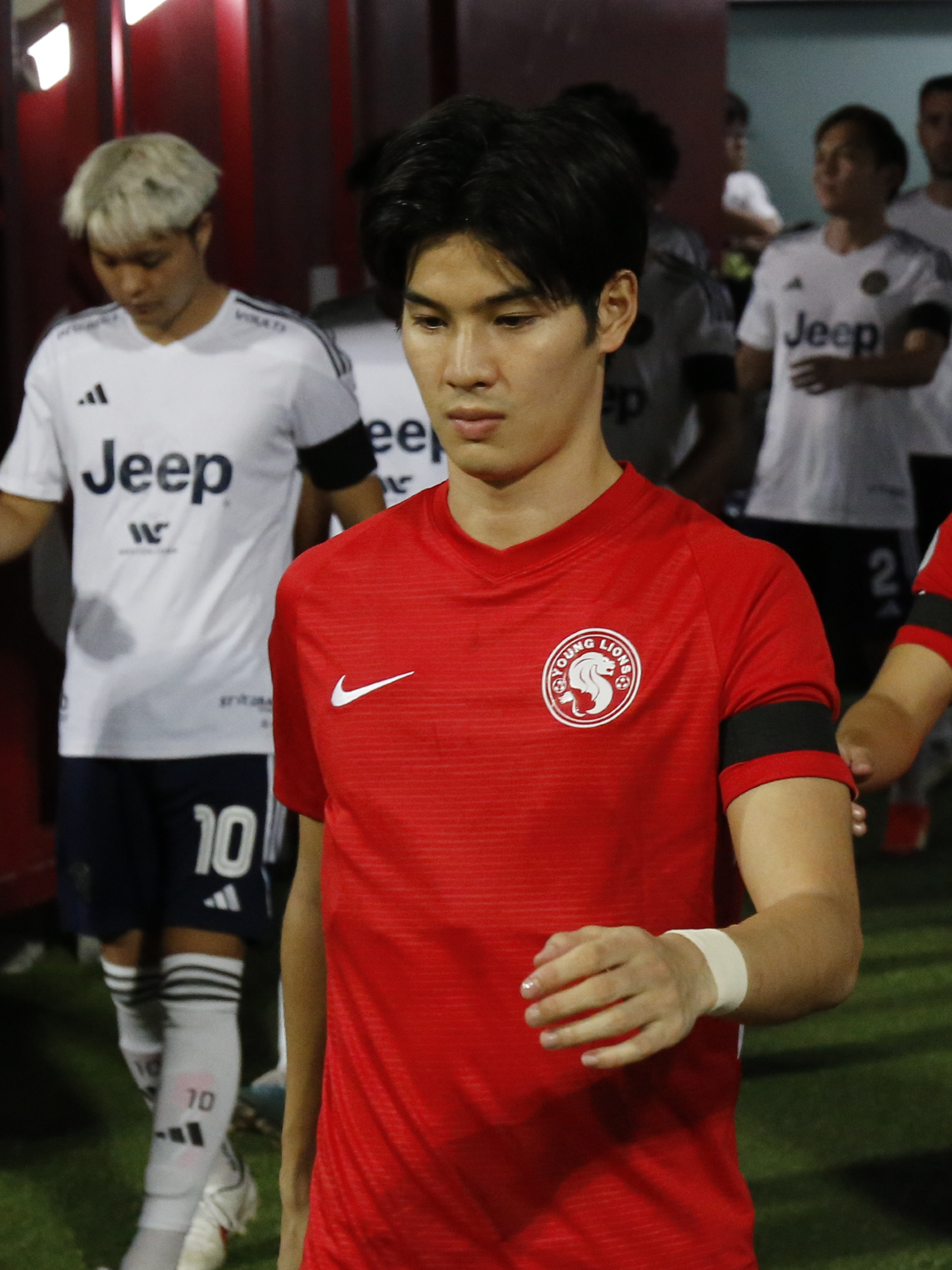

Personal information
- Date of birth: April 27, 1999 (age 27)
- Place of birth: Tokyo, Japan
- Height: 1.82 m (6 ft 0 in)
- Positions: Central midfielder; left winger

Team information
- Current team: Chuncheon FC

Youth career
- Tamadaira Junior SC
- –2017: FC Tokyo

College career
Years	Team	Apps	(Gls)
2018–2021	University of Tsukuba		

Senior career*
Years	Team	Apps	(Gls)
2017	FC Tokyo U-23	22	(4)
2022	Albirex Niigata (S)	26	(5)
2023-	Young Lions	18	(1)
- * Club domestic league appearances and goals

Kan Kobayashi (小林 幹, Kobayashi Kan; born 27 April 1999) is a Japanese professional footballer who plays as a central-midfielder or left-winger for Singapore Premier League club Chuncheon.

Kan played for the FC Tokyo U-23 and most recently Albirex Niigata (S) FC in the Singapore Premier League, where he won the 2022 Singapore Premier League and helping the club win its 5th title.

== Club career ==
=== FC Tokyo U-23 ===
Kan started his senior career playing with FC Tokyo U-23 in 2017 which plays in the J3 League. He ended the season with 4 goals in 22 appearances.

=== Albirex Niigata ===
Kan joined Singapore Premier League side Albirex Niigata on a free transfer from his university. He ended the season with 33 appearances for the side along with 5 goals scored.

=== Young Lions ===
Kan joined the developmental side on a free transfer from Albirex Niigata (S) as part of the Young Lions' new plan. He is joined by Jun Kobayashi who together become the first foreigners to play for the Young Lions since 2016. On 8 April 2023, Kan scored his first goal for the club against Balestier Khalsa.

== Career statistics ==
=== Club ===
As of 28 Mar 25.

Club	Season	League			Cup		Other		Total	
Club	Season	Division	Apps	Goals	Apps	Goals	Apps	Goals	Apps	Goals
FC Tokyo U-23	2017	J3 League	22	4	0	0	0	0	22	4
Tsukuba University	2020	–			5 (Note: Appearances in the Emperor's Cup)	1	0	0	5	1
Albirex Niigata (S)	2022	SPL	26	5	6	1	1	0	33	6
Young Lions FC	2023	SPL	18	1	2	1	0	0	20	2
Young Lions FC	2024–25	SPL	23	3	4	2	0	0	27	5
Young Lions FC	Total		41	4	6	3	0	0	47	7
Career total			89	12	17	5	1	0	107	18

== International Statistics ==
=== U18 International caps ===
No	Date	Venue	Opponent	Result	Competition
1	10 August 2017	Fujieda-sogo Stadium, Japan	Chile	1-2 (lost)	SBS Cup

== Honours ==
=== Club ===
Albirex Niigata (S):

• Singapore Premier League: 2022
