= 2023 Young Lions FC season =

Young Lions
2023 season
- Chairman: Farehan Hussein
- Head coach: Philippe Aw
- Stadium: Jalan Besar Stadium
- S.League: 8th of 8th
- Singapore Cup: on progress
- Top goalscorer: League: Jun Kobayashi (3 goals); All: Jun Kobayashi (3 goals)
Home colours	Away colours

The 2023 season was Young Lions' 20th consecutive season in the top flight of Singapore football and in the S.League. The club also competed in the Singapore Cup.

== Squad ==
As of 26 Sept 2019.

Squad No.	Name	Nationality	Date of Birth (Age)	Last Club	Contract Start	Contract End
Goalkeepers
1	Prathip Ekamparam	(Singapore)	21 August 2001 (age 25)	(Singapore) Lion City Sailors U21	2023	2023
13	Rauf Erwan	(Singapore)	25 April 2005 (age 21)	Singapore Sports School	2022	2023
25	Aizil Yazid	(Singapore)	24 December 2004 (age 21)	(Singapore) Hougang United	2023	2023
32	Umayr Sujuandy	(Singapore)	18 February 2003 (age 23)	Singapore Sports School	2021	2023
Defenders
5	Jun Kobayashi	(Japan)	7 May 1999 (age 27)	(Japan) Albirex Niigata (S)	2023	2023
8	Harhys Stewart	(Singapore) (Wales)	20 March 2001 (age 25)	(Singapore) Hougang United U21	2020	2023
15	Kieran Teo Jia Jun	(Singapore)	6 April 2004 (age 22)	(Singapore) Geylang International U21	2023	2023
20	Ilhan Noor	(Singapore)	19 December 2002 (age 23)	(Singapore) Geylang International	2023	2023
26	Ikram Mikhail Mustaqim	(Singapore)	5 August 2005 (age 21)	(Singapore) Tanjong Pagar United U21	2023	2023
27	Syafi Hilman	(Singapore)	27 July 2004 (age 22)	(Singapore) Lion City Sailors U21	2023	2023
34	Aqil Yazid	(Singapore)	9 January 2004 (age 22)	(Singapore) Balestier Khalsa U21	2023	2023
36	Danish Haqimi	(Singapore)	22 March 2007 (age 19)	Singapore Sports School	2023	2023
38	Xavier Wong	(Singapore)		(Finland) FC Inter Turku	2023	2023
39	Sahffee Jubpre	(Singapore)	31 March 2001 (age 25)	(Singapore) Hougang United U19	2023	2023
Midfielders
4	Jared Gallagher	(Singapore) (Republic of Ireland)	18 January 2002 (age 24)	(Hong Kong) Kitchee SC Reserve	2021	2023
7	Kan Kobayashi	(Japan)	27 April 1999 (age 27)	(Japan) Albirex Niigata (S)	2023	2023
10	Amir Syafiz	(Singapore)	21 June 2004 (age 22)	Singapore Sports School	2021	2023
21	Iman Hakim	(Singapore)	9 March 2002 (age 24)	(Singapore) Tampines Rovers	2023	2024
30	Fairuz Fazli Koh	(Singapore)	20 January 2005 (age 21)	Singapore Sport School	2022	2023
35	Loo Kai Sheng	(Singapore)	9 January 2007 (age 19)	Singapore Sport School	2023	2023
37	Farhan Zulkifli	(Singapore)	10 November 2002 (age 24)	(Singapore) Hougang United U21	2023	2024
42	Haziq Kamarudin	(Singapore)	6 March 2001 (age 25)	(Singapore) Lion City Sailors U21	2023	2023
	Rasul Ramli	(Singapore)	26 March 2007 (age 19)	Singapore Sport School	2023	2023
	Ethan Henry Pinto	(Singapore)	14 October 2004 (age 22)	(Singapore) Tampines Rovers U21	2023	2024
Forwards
9	Zikos Vasileios Chua	(Singapore) (Greece)	15 April 2002 (age 24)	(Singapore) Geylang International	2018	2023
16	Ryan Praveen	(Singapore)	28 May 2002 (age 24)	(Singapore) Balestier Khalsa U21	2023	2023
18	Syafi’ie Redzuan	(Singapore)	25 October 2003 (age 23)	(Singapore) Hougang United U21	2023	2023
19	Syahadat Masnawi	(Singapore)	7 November 2001 (age 25)	(Singapore) Sporting Westlake	2023	2023
28	Ameen Shah	(Singapore)	8 August 2005 (age 21)	(Japan) Albirex Academy	2023	2023
40	Amiruldin Asraf	(Singapore)	8 January 1997 (age 29)	(Singapore) Lion City Sailors	2023	2023
41	Irfan Iskandar	(Singapore)	16 August 2004 (age 22)	Singapore Sports School	2022	2023
	Khairin Nadim	(Singapore)	8 May 2004 (age 22)	(Singapore) Woodlands Secondary School	2020	2022
Players who left during the season
3	Danial Crichton	(Singapore) (Scotland) (Canada)	11 April 2003 (age 23)	(Singapore) Warriors FC U21	2020	2023
6	Jacob Mahler	(Singapore) (Denmark)	20 April 2000 (age 26)	(Singapore) FFA Under-18	2018	2023
11	Harith Kanadi	(Singapore)	1 August 2000 (age 26)	(Singapore) Geylang International	2022	2023
17	Adam Reefdy	(Singapore)	8 May 2004 (age 22)	(Singapore) Tampines Rovers U21	2023	2024
22	Elijah Lim Teck Yong	(Singapore)	8 May 2001 (age 25)	(Singapore) Geylang International	2022	2023
23	Jordan Emaviwe	(Singapore) (Nigeria)	9 April 2001 (age 25)	(Singapore) Balestier Khalsa	2021	2023
24	Wayne Chew	(Singapore)	22 October 2001 (age 25)	(Singapore) Geylang International	2022	2023
Players who left for NS during season
14	Ryu Hardy Yussri	(Singapore)	20 April 2005 (age 21)	Singapore Sport School	2022	2023
31	Keshav Kumar	(Singapore)	6 February 2001 (age 25)	Balestier Khalsa	2023	2023
29	Andrew Aw	(Singapore)	29 March 2003 (age 23)	(Singapore) Tampines Rovers U21	2023	2024
33	Danial Iliya	(Singapore)	6 February 2003 (age 23)	(Singapore) Tampines Rovers	2023	2023
2	Raoul Suhaimi	(Singapore)	18 September 2005 (age 21)	Singapore Sports School	2021	2023

== Coaching staff ==
Position	Name
Team Manager	(Singapore) Matthew Sean (Singapore) Sakthi Vel Ganesan
Head team coach	(Singapore) Nazri Nasir
Assistant coach	(Japan) Koichiro Iizuka (Singapore) Fadzuhasny Juraimi (Singapore) Afiq Yahya
Goalkeeping coach	(Singapore) Ahmadulhaq Che Omar
Fitness coach	(Singapore) Donald Wan
Physiotherapist	(Singapore) Vacant
Sports Trainers	(Singapore) Nasruldin Baharudin (Singapore) Muklis Sawit
Equipment Officer	(Singapore) Omar Mohamed

== Transfer ==
=== In ===
Pre-Season

Position	Player	Transferred From	Team	Ref
GK	(Singapore) Prathip Ekamparam	(Singapore) Lion City Sailors	First Team	Free
DF	(Singapore) Syafi Hilman	(Singapore) Lion City Sailors U21	First Team	Free
DF	(Singapore) Aqil Yazid	(Singapore) Balestier Khalsa U21	First Team	Free
DF	(Singapore) Keshav Kumar	(Singapore) Balestier Khalsa	First Team	
DF	(Japan) Jun Kobayashi	(Japan) Albirex Niigata (S)	First Team	Free
MF	(Japan) Kan Kobayashi	(Japan) Albirex Niigata (S)	First Team	Free
MF	(Singapore) Ethan Henry Pinto	(Singapore) Tampines Rovers U21	First Team	Free
MF	(Singapore) Haziq Kamarudin	NA	First Team	Free
FW	(Singapore) Syahadat Masnawi	(Singapore) Sporting Westlake	First Team	Free

Mid-Season

Position	Player	Transferred From	Team	Ref
DF	(Singapore) Danish Haqimi	Singapore Sports School	First Team	Free
DF	(Singapore) Sahffee Jubpre	(Singapore) SAFSA	First Team	Free
MF	(Singapore) Loo Kai Sheng	Singapore Sports School	First Team	Free
FW	(Singapore) Irfan Iskandar	(Singapore)	First Team	Free
FW	(Singapore) Amiruldin Asraf	(Singapore) Lion City Sailors	First Team	Free

=== Out ===
Pre-Season

Position	Player	Transferred To	Team	Ref
GK	(Singapore) Ridhwan Fikri	(Singapore) Geylang International	First Team	Free
GK	(Singapore) Dylan Pereira	Retired	First Team	
DF	(Singapore) (Germany) Moritz Faizal Radewaldt	(Germany) FC Bad Wörishofen (Kreisliga Bayern)	First Team	Free
DF	(Singapore) Syabil Hisham	(Singapore) Balestier Khalsa	First Team	Free
DF	(Singapore) Syed Akmal	(Singapore) Tanjong Pagar United	First Team	Free
MF	(Singapore) Syed Adel Alsree	(Singapore) Lion City Sailors U21	U21	Free
MF	(Singapore) Danish Qayyum	(Singapore) Lion City Sailors U21	U21	Free
MF	(Singapore) Nor Hakim Redzuan	(Singapore)	First Team	Free
FW	(Singapore) Abdul Rasaq	(Singapore) Lion City Sailors	First Team	Free
FW	(Singapore) Khairin Nadim	(Singapore) Lion City Sailors U21	U21	Free (Note: Khairin Nadim signed and loaned to Young lions while serving NS)
FW	(Singapore) Glenn Kweh	(Singapore) Tampines Rovers	First Team	Free

Mid-Season

Position	Player	Transferred To	Team	Ref
DF	(Singapore) (Denmark) Jacob Mahler	(Indonesia) Madura United	First Team	Free
DF	(Singapore) (Scotland) Danial Crichton	(United States) University TRGV	First Team	Free
MF	(Singapore) Loo Kai Sheng	(Spain) ESC La Liga Academy	U15	Free

=== Loan in ===
Pre-Season

Position	Player	Transferred From	Team	Ref
GK	(Singapore) Wayne Chew	(Singapore) SAFSA (Geylang)	First Team	Season loan till 2023
GK	(Singapore) Danial Iliya	(Singapore) SAFSA (Tampines)	First Team	Season loan till 2023
GK	(Singapore) Aizil Yazid	(Singapore) SAFSA (Hougang)	First Team	Season loan till 2024
MF	(Singapore) Elijah Lim Teck Yong	(Singapore) SAFSA (Geylang)	First Team	Season loan till 2023
DF	(Singapore) Ilhan Noor	(Singapore) SAFSA (Geylang)	First Team	Season loan till 2024
DF	(Singapore) Harith Kanadi	(Singapore) SAFSA (Geylang)	First Team	Season loan
DF	(Singapore) Kieran Teo Jia Jun	(Singapore) SAFSA (Geylang)	First Team	Season loan
DF	(Singapore) (Wales) Harhys Stewart	(Singapore) SAFSA (Hougang)	First Team	Season loan
DF	(Singapore) Ikram Mikhail Mustaqim	(Singapore) SAFSA (Tanjong Pagar)	First Team	Season loan
DF	(Singapore) Andrew Aw	(Singapore) SAFSA (Tampines)	First Team	Season loan till 2024
DF	(Singapore) Adam Reefdy	(Singapore) SAFSA (Tampines)	First Team	Season loan till 2024
DF	(Singapore) (Nigeria) Jordan Emaviwe	(Singapore) Balestier Khalsa	First Team	Season loan
MF	(Singapore) Iman Hakim	(Singapore) SAFSA (Tampines)	First Team	Season loan
FW	(Singapore) (Greece) Zikos Vasileios Chua	(Singapore) SAFSA (Geylang)	First Team	Season loan
FW	(Singapore) Ryan Praveen	(Singapore) SAFSA (Balestier)	First Team	Season loan
FW	(Singapore) Syafi’ie Redzuan	(Singapore) SAFSA (Hougang)	First Team	Season loan
FW	(Singapore) Khairin Nadim	(Singapore) SAFSA (LCS)	First Team	Season loan

Mid-Season

Position	Player	Transferred From	Team	Ref
MF	(Singapore) Farhan Zulkifli	(Singapore) SAFSA (Hougang)	First Team	Season loan
MF	(Singapore) Amir Syafiz	(Singapore) SAFSA (Note: Amir Syafiz take a break of 3 months for enlistment before returning to the team.)	First Team	Season loan

=== Loan return ===
Pre-Season

Position	Player	Transferred To	Ref
GK	(Singapore) Putra Anugerah	(Singapore) Lion City Sailors FC	Loan Return
GK	(Singapore) Martyn Mun	(Singapore) SAFSA	Loan Return
DF	(Singapore) (Wales) Harhys Stewart	(Singapore) Hougang United	Loan Return
MF	(Singapore) (Nigeria) Jordan Emaviwe	(Singapore) SAFSA	Loan Return (Note: Jordan Emaviwe extends his loan after completion of NS in March 2023 till June 2023)
MF	(Singapore) Nor Hakim Redzuan	(Singapore) Hougang United	Loan Return
MF	(Singapore) Shah Shahiran	(Singapore) SAFSA	Loan Return

Mid-Season

Position	Player	Transferred To	First Team	Ref
GK	(Singapore) Danial Iliya	(Singapore) SAFSA (Tampines)	First Team	Loan Return
DF	(Singapore) Andrew Aw	(Singapore) SAFSA (Tampines)	First Team	Loan Return
DF	(Singapore) Adam Reefdy	(Singapore) SAFSA (Tampines)	First Team	Loan Return
DF	(Singapore) (Nigeria) Jordan Emaviwe	(Singapore) Balestier Khalsa	First Team	Loan Return (Note: Jordan Emaviwe re-join Balestier after his loan to Young Lions ended.)
GK	(Singapore) Wayne Chew	(Singapore) SAFSA (Geylang)	First Team	Loan Return (Note: Wayne Chew joined Balestier after his loan to Young Lions ended and released by Geylang.)
DF	(Singapore) Harith Kanadi	(Singapore) SAFSA (Geylang)	First Team	Loan Return (Note: Harith Kanadi joined LCS after his loan to Young Lions ended.)
MF	(Singapore) Elijah Lim Teck Yong	(Singapore) SAFSA (Geylang)	First Team	Loan Return (Note: Elijah Lim joined Balestier after his loan to Young Lions ended and released by Geylang.)

=== Loan out ===
Mid-season

Position	Player	Transferred To	Team	Ref
DF	(Singapore) Keshav Kumar	(Singapore) SAFSA	First Team	NS till July 2025
DF	(Singapore) Raoul Suhaimi	(Singapore) SAFSA	First Team	NS till July 2025
MF	(Singapore) Amir Syafiz	(Singapore) SAFSA	First Team	NS till July 2025
MF	(Singapore) Ryu Hardy Yussri	(Singapore) SAFSA	First Team	NS till July 2025

=== Retained ===
Position	Player	Ref
GK	(Singapore) Umayr Sujuandy	1 year extension till 2023
GK	(Singapore) Rauf Erwan	1 year extension till 2023
GK	(Singapore) Wayne Chew (Note: Wayne Chew extends contract till end of NS.)	1 year extension till 2023
DF	(Singapore) Raoul Suhaimi (Note: Raoul Suhaimi extends contract till start of NS.)	1 year extension till 2023
DF	(Singapore) (Scotland) Danial Crichton (Note: Danial Crichton extends contract till end of NS.)	1 year extension till 2023
DF	(Singapore) (Denmark) Jacob Mahler (Note: Jacob Mahler extends contract till end of NS.)	1 year extension till 2023
MF	(Singapore) (Republic of Ireland) Jared Gallagher	1 year extension till 2023
MF	(Singapore) Amir Syafiz (Note: Amir Syafiz extends contract till start of NS.)	1 year extension till 2023
MF	(Singapore) Ryu Hardy (Note: Ryu Hardy extends contract till start of NS.)	1 year extension till 2023
MF	(Singapore) Fairuz Fazli	1 year extension till 2023

=== Training stint ===
Position	Player	Club
MF	(Singapore) (Republic of Ireland) Jared Gallagher	(Republic of Ireland) Sligo Rovers F.C.

== Friendly ==
=== Pre-season friendly ===
Win Draw Loss

== Team statistics ==
=== Appearances and goals (SPL) ===
As of 26 Nov 2023

Numbers in parentheses denote appearances as substitute.

No.	Pos.	Player	Sleague		Singapore Cup		Total	
No.	Pos.	Player	Apps.	Goals	Apps.	Goals	Apps.	Goals
1	GK	(Singapore) Prathip Ekamparam	1	0	1	0	2	0
4	MF	(Singapore) (Republic of Ireland) Jared Gallagher	19	2	4	1	22	2
5	DF	(Japan) Jun Kobayashi	24	3	3	0	27	3
7	MF	(Japan) Kan Kobayashi	18	1	1+1	1	19	1
8	DF	(Singapore) (Wales) Harhys Stewart	18+3	3	4	0	24	3
9	FW	(Singapore) (Greece) Zikos Vasileios Chua	2+2	1	1	0	5	1
10	MF	(Singapore) Amir Syafiz	6+1	0	1+1	0	8	0
13	GK	(Singapore) Rauf Erwan	0	0	0	0	0	0
15	DF	(Singapore) Kieran Teo Jia Jun	18	1	3+1	1	21	1
16	FW	(Singapore) Ryan Praveen	0+8	0	1+2	0	11	0
18	FW	(Singapore) Syafi’ie Redzuan	7+7	1	0	0	14	1
19	FW	(Singapore) Syahadat Masnawi	15+5	1	1+1	0	22	1
20	DF	(Singapore) Ilhan Noor	10+4	0	1	0	15	0
21	MF	(Singapore) Iman Hakim	5+3	0	4	0	11	0
25	GK	(Singapore) Aizil Yazid	19+1	0	0	0	20	0
26	DF	(Singapore) Ikram Mikhail Mustaqim	0+4	0	0+1	0	4	0
27	DF	(Singapore) Syafi Hilman	0+2	0	0	0	2	0
28	FW	(Singapore) Ameen Shah	0	0	0	0	0	0
30	MF	(Singapore) Fairuz Fazli Koh	17+6	2	0	0	23	1
32	GK	(Singapore) Umayr Sujuandy	1	0	3	0	3	0
34	DF	(Singapore) Aqil Yazid	11+4	0	1	0	16	0
35	MF	(Singapore) Loo Kai Sheng	0+2	0	0+1	0	3	0
36	DF	(Singapore) Danish Haqimi	0+2	0	3+1	0	5	0
37	MF	(Singapore) Farhan Zulkifli	6+1	0	3	1	9	0
39	DF	(Singapore) Sahffee Jubpre	0+1	0	3	0	4	0
40	FW	(Singapore) Amiruldin Asraf	4+2	2	2+2	0	9	2
41	FW	(Singapore) Irfan Iskandar	0	0	0+2	0	2	0
42	MF	(Singapore) Haziq Kamarudin	4+11	1	3	0	17	1
??	MF	(Singapore) Ethan Henry Pinto	0	0	0	0	0	0
Players who have played this season and/or sign for the season but had left the club or on loan to other club
2	DF	(Singapore) Raoul Suhaimi	9	0	0	0	9	0
3	DF	(Singapore) (Scotland) Danial Scott Crichton	2+1	0	0	0	3	0
6	DF	(Singapore) (Denmark) Jacob Mahler	3+1	0	0	0	4	0
11	DF	(Singapore) Harith Kanadi	9+8	1	0	0	17	1
14	MF	(Singapore) Ryu Hardy Yussri	3+5	1	0	0	8	1
17	DF	(Singapore) Adam Reefdy	4+3	0	0	0	7	0
22	MF	(Singapore) Elijah Lim Teck Yong	9+6	2	0	0	15	2
23	DF	(Singapore) (Nigeria) Jordan Emaviwe	6+1	3	0	0	7	3
24	GK	(Singapore) Wayne Chew	3	0	0	0	3	0
29	DF	(Singapore) Andrew Aw	10+3	0	0	0	13	0
31	DF	(Singapore) Keshav Kumar	1+1	0	0	0	2	0
33	GK	(Singapore) Danial Iliya	0	0	0	0	0	0

== Competitions ==
=== Singapore Premier League ===
Win Draw Loss

25 February 2023 1	Albirex Niigata (S) (Japan)	3–0	(Singapore) Young Lions FC	Jurong East
	Shuto Komaki 33'; Asahi Yokokawa 51'; Koki Kawachi 89'	Report	Aqil Yazid (yellow card) 11'; Elijah Lim Teck Yong (yellow card) 74'	Stadium: Jurong East Stadium; Referee: Taufik Thana

28 February 2023 2	Geylang International (Singapore)	4–2	(Singapore) Young Lions FC	Tampines
	Yushi Yamaya 25' (pen.) (yellow card) 90+7'; Naufal Azman 56'; Rio Sakuma 63' 70'; Takahiro Tezuka (yellow card) 48'; Akmal Azman (red card) 78'; Joshua Pereira (yellow card) 90+1'	Report	Harith Kanadi 7'; Jun Kobayashi 52'; Elijah Lim Teck Yong (yellow card) 43'	Stadium: Our Tampines Hub; Referee: Clarence Leow

4 March 2023 3	Balestier Khalsa (Singapore)	3–1	(Singapore) Young Lions FC	Bishan
	Shuhei Hoshino 6'; Ho Wai Loon 32' 46'	Report	Jordan Emaviwe 90+10' (pen.); Harith Kanadi (yellow card) 45+3'; Jared Gallagher (yellow card) 50'; Amir Syafiz (yellow card) 77'	Stadium: Bishan Stadium; Referee: Hilmi Faud

9 March 2023 4	Young Lions FC (Singapore)	0–3	(Singapore) Tampines Rovers	Jalan Besar
	Ilhan Noor (yellow card) 90'	Report	Taufik Suparno 31'; Faris Ramli 34'; Ong Yu En 82'; Kyoga Nakamura (yellow card) 49'; Syed Firdaus Hassan (yellow card) 79'	Stadium: Jalan Besar Stadium; Referee: Andrea Verolino

18 March 2023 5	Young Lions FC (Singapore)	2–1	(Singapore) Hougang United	Jalan Besar
	Jared Gallagher 81'; Harhys Stewart 83'; Ilhan Noor (yellow card) 31'; Jacob Mahler (yellow card) 90+5'	Report	Hazzuwan Halim 44'; Naoki Kuriyama (yellow card) 38'; Nazrul Nazari (yellow card) 63'	Stadium: Jalan Besar Stadium; Referee: Clarence Leow

1 April 2023 6	Tanjong Pagar United (Singapore)	2–1	(Singapore) Young Lions FC	Jurong East
	Syukri Bashir 39'; Shakir Hamzah 54'; Faizal Roslan (yellow card) 44'; Tajeli Salamat (red card) 48'; Marin Mudražija (yellow card) 74'	Report	Jacob Mahler (yellow card) 11' (yellow-red card) 23'; Amir Syafiz (yellow card) 61'; Harhys Stewart 78' (yellow card) 70'; Aizil Yazid (yellow card) 90'	Stadium: Jurong East Stadium; Referee: Hilmi Fuad

8 April 2023 7	Young Lions FC (Singapore)	1–3	(Singapore) Balestier Khalsa	Jalan Besar
	Kan Kobayashi 10'; Aqil Yazid (yellow card) 18'; Harith Kanadi (yellow card) 32' (yellow-red card) 36'	Report	Ryoya Tanigushi 16' 86'; Daniel Goh 23'; Fudhil I'yadh (yellow card) 36'; Madhu Mohana (yellow card) 47'; Iqram Rifqi (yellow card) 48'; Fabian Kwok (yellow card) 76'; Syukri Noorhaizam (yellow card) 79'	Stadium: Jalan Besar Stadium; Referee: Jansen Foo

11 April 2023 8	Young Lions FC (Singapore)	2–2	(Brunei) DPMM FC	Jalan Besar
	Kieran Teo Jia Jun 87'; Jordan Emaviwe 89'; Harhys Stewart (yellow card) 60'	Report	Ángel Martínez 45+3'; Andrey Varankow 81'	Stadium: Jalan Besar Stadium; Referee: Taufik Thana

15 April 2023 9	Young Lions FC (Singapore)	1–1	(Singapore) Lion City Sailors	Jalan Besar
	Jordan Emaviwe 90+8' (pen.)	Report	Maxime Lestienne 6'; Hami Syahin (yellow card) 32'; Lionel Tan (yellow card) 90+5'	Stadium: Jalan Besar Stadium; Referee: Andrea Verolino

20 May 2023 10	Tampines Rovers (Singapore)	1–0	(Singapore) Young Lions FC	Tampines
	Boris Kopitović 2'	Report		Stadium: Our Tampines Hub; Referee: Clarence Leow Hong Wei

27 May 2023 11	Young Lions FC (Singapore)	0–2	(Singapore) Geylang International	Jalan Besar
	Raoul Suhaimi (yellow card) 48'	Report	Iqbal Hussain 41'; Amirul Adli 70'; Gareth Low (yellow card) 62'	Stadium: Jalan Besar Stadium; Referee: Farhad Mohamed

3 June 2023 12	Hougang United (Singapore)	3–0	(Singapore) Young Lions FC	Jalan Besar
	Sahil Suhaimi 7'; Nazrul Nazari 12'; Gabriel Quak 45+2'; Ajay Robson (yellow card) 85'	Report	Ryu Hardy Yussri (yellow card) 52'; Syahadat Masnawi (yellow card) 70'	Stadium: Jalan Besar Stadium; Referee: Taufik Thana

6 June 2023 12	Young Lions FC (Singapore)	3–4	(Singapore) Tanjong Pagar United	Jalan Besar
	Jared Gallagher 27' (yellow card) 41'; Elijah Lim Teck Yong 29' 39'	Report	Blake Ricciuto 33'; Jun Kobayashi 55' (o.g.); Faizal Roslan 71'; Shakir Hamzah 89'; Fathullah Rahmat (yellow card) 15'; Marin Mudražija (yellow card) 76'	Stadium: Jalan Besar Stadium; Referee: Clarence Leow Hong Wei

10 June 2023 14	Lion City Sailors (Singapore)	4–1	(Singapore) Young Lions FC	Bishan
	Kan Kobayashi 18' (o.g.); Shawal Anuar 32'; Abdul Rasaq 40'; Maxime Lestienne 53'; Anumanthan Kumar (yellow card) 45+2'; Hami Syahin (yellow card) 48'; Nur Adam Abdullah (yellow card) 61'	Report	Jun Kobayashi 87'; Aqil Yazid (yellow card) 90+2'	Stadium: Bishan Stadium; Referee: Andrea Verolino

24 June 2023 15	DPMM FC (Brunei)	6–0	(Singapore) Young Lions FC	Jalan Besar
	Azwan Ali Rahman 2'; Andrey Voronkov 6' 50'; Farshad Noor 39' (pen.); Hanif Farhan Azman 48'; Hakeme Yazid Said 66'; Fakharrazi Hassan (yellow card) 45+1'; Syafiq Hilmi Shahrom (yellow card) 87'	Report	Harith Kanadi (yellow card) 45+2'; Ryu Hardy Yussri (yellow card) 80'; Syafi’ie Redzuan (yellow card) 81'	Stadium: Jalan Besar Stadium (Note: Hassanal Bolkiah National Stadium unavailable due to ongoing renovations.); Referee: Jansen Foo

1 July 2023 16	Young Lions FC (Singapore)	2–4	(Japan) Albirex Niigata (S)	Jalan Besar
	Ryu Hardy Yussri 64' (yellow card) 76'; Jun Kobayashi 90+5'; Harhys Stewart (yellow card) 29'; Kan Kobayashi (penalty missed) 90+4	Report	Harhys Stewart 3' (o.g.); Nicky Melvin Singh 33'; Keito Komatsu 43'; Shodai Yokoyama 88'; Seia Kunori (yellow card) 86'	Stadium: Jalan Besar Stadium; Referee: Hilmi Fuad

7 July 2023 17	Young Lions FC (Singapore)	0–4	(Singapore) Lion City Sailors	Jalan Besar
	Syahadat Masnawi (yellow card) 61'; Aqil Yazid (yellow card) 63'; Jun Kobayashi (yellow card) 88'	Report	Maxime Lestienne 60' 68' 88'; Shawal Anuar 86'; Hafiz Nor (yellow card) 75'; Rusyaidi Salime (yellow card) 90+1'	Stadium: Jalan Besar Stadium; Referee: Farhad Mohamed

12 July 2023 18	Balestier Khalsa (Singapore)	4–2	(Singapore) Young Lions FC	Bishan
	Shuhei Hoshino 33'; Ryoya Tanigushi 65' 82'; Alen Kozar 71'	Report	Haziq Kamarudin 48'; Amiruldin Asraf 90+5'; Harhys Stewart (yellow card) 16'; Jared Gallagher (yellow card) 72'	Stadium: Bishan Stadium; Referee: Taufik Thana

15 July 2023 19	Young Lions FC (Singapore)	2–3	(Singapore) Tampines Rovers	Jalan Besar
	Syahadat Masnawi 41'; Fairuz Fazli Koh 71'; Harith Kanadi (yellow card) 65'; Jared Gallagher (yellow card) 89'	Report	Yasir Hanapi 18' 62'; Faris Ramli 62'; Syazwan Buhari (red card) 48'; Ryaan Sanizal (yellow card) 90+3'	Stadium: Jalan Besar Stadium; Referee: Jansen Foo

22 July 2023 20	Albirex Niigata (S) (Japan)	5–0	(Singapore) Young Lions FC	Jurong East
	Keito Komatsu 6' 15' 23' (pen.); Hilman Norhisam 67'; Shunsaku Kishimoto 82'	Report	Aqil Yazid (yellow card) 31' (yellow-red card) 35'; Haziq Kamarudin (red card) 40'	Stadium: Jurong East Stadium; Referee: Hilmi Fuad; Man of the Match: Keito Komatsu

29 July 2023 21	Young Lions FC (Singapore)	2–6	(Singapore) Hougang United	Jalan Besar
	Harhys Stewart 47'; Zikos Vasileios Chua 90+2'; Fairuz Fazli Koh (yellow card) 44'; Jared Gallagher (yellow card) 65'	Report	Djordje Maksimovic 9' 67'; Kristijan Krajcek 41' 90+1'; Gabriel Quak 52'; Kazuma Takayama 64'; Naoki Kuriyama (yellow card) 15'	Stadium: Jalan Besar Stadium; Referee: Syarqawi Buhari

5 August 2023 22	Tanjong Pagar United (Singapore)	3–2	(Singapore) Young Lions FC	Jurong East
	Syukri Bashir (penalty missed) 6 42' (pen.); Marin Mudrazija 7'; Pedro Dias 69'	Report	Amiruldin Asraf (penalty missed) 31 84'; Syafi’ie Redzuan 51'	Stadium: Jurong East Stadium; Referee: Ahmad A'qashah

12 August 2023 23	Young Lions FC (Singapore)	0–2	(Brunei) DPMM FC	Jalan Besar
	Syafi'ie Redzuan (yellow card) 80'	Report	Nazirrudin Ismail 67' 90+4'; Azwan Bin Ali Rahman (yellow card) 87'; Kristijan Naumovski (yellow card) 90+3'	Stadium: Jalan Besar Stadium; Referee: Taufik Thana

19 August 2023 24	Geylang International (Singapore)	3–0	(Singapore) Young Lions FC	Tampines
	Joshua Pereira 40' 72'; Gareth Low 57'	Report	Jared Gallagher (yellow card) 70'; Ilhan Noor (yellow card) 83'	Stadium: Our Tampines Hub; Referee: Andrea Verolino; Man of the Match: Joshua Pereira

Pos	Team	Pld	W	D	L	GF	GA	GD	Pts
5	Geylang International	24	10	3	11	41	52	−11	33
6	Hougang United	24	9	2	13	37	57	−20	29
7	Brunei DPMM (Note: Three clubs – Albirex Niigata (S), DPMM FC and the FAS under-23 team Young Lions, are ineligible for any AFC competition spots.)	24	6	5	13	39	43	−4	23
8	Tanjong Pagar United	24	6	3	15	39	62	−23	21
9	Young Lions	24	1	2	21	24	76	−52	5

Source: Singapore Premier League
Rules for classification: 1) points; 2) goal difference; 3) number of goals scored; 4) number of wins

=== Singapore Cup ===
Pos	Team	Pld	W	D	L	GF	GA	GD	Pts	Qualification
1	Brunei DPMM (Q)	4	3	1	0	7	2	+5	10	Semi-finals
2	Tampines Rovers (Q)	4	2	1	1	9	3	+6	7	Semi-finals
3	Albirex Niigata (S)	4	1	2	1	5	4	+1	5	
4	Geylang International	4	1	0	3	6	12	−6	3	
5	Young Lions	4	1	0	3	4	10	−6	3	

Updated to match(es) played on 29 September 2023. Source: FAS
(Q) Qualified for the phase indicated

24 September 2023 Group Match 1	Tampines Rovers (Singapore)	5–0	(Singapore) Young Lions FC	Tampines
	Shuya Yamashita 50'; Yasir Hanapi 64'; Boris Kopitović (penalty missed) 45+10 82'; Faris Ramli 85' 90+1'; Kyoga Nakamura (yellow card) 36'; Shah Shahiran (yellow card) 60'	Report	Aqil Yazid (yellow card) 28'; Nazri Nasir (yellow card) 45+10'; Harhys Stewart (yellow card) 83'; Syahadat Masnawi (yellow card) 85'	Stadium: Our Tampines Hub; Referee: Farhad Mohamed

22 October 2023 Group Match 2	Albirex Niigata (S) (Japan)	2–0	(Singapore) Young Lions FC	Jurong East
	Seia Kunori 37'; Shodai Yokoyama 75'	Report		Stadium: Jurong East Stadium; Referee: Ahmad A'qashah

4 November 2023 Group Match 3	Young Lions FC (Singapore)	0–1	Brunei DPMM	Jalan Besar
	Sahffee Jubpre (red card) 90+2'; Farhan Zulkifli (penalty missed) 87	Report	Farshad Noor 34'; Hanif Hamir (yellow card) 83'	Stadium: Jalan Besar Stadium; Referee: Clarence Leow Hong Wei

26 November 2023 Group Match 4	Geylang International (Singapore)	2–4	(Singapore) Young Lions FC	Tampines
	Takahiro Tezuka 39'; Yushi Yamaya 43'; Ahmad Syahir (red card) 49'; Shahfiq Ghani (red card) 75'	Report	Kan Kobayashi 56'; Kieran Teo Jia Jun 59'; Jared Gallagher 90+1' (yellow card) 61'; Farhan Zulkifli 90+4'; Haziq Kamarudin (yellow card) 38'; Harhys Stewart (yellow card) 87'	Stadium: Our Tampines Hub; Referee: Taufik Thana
