= 2024–25 Young Lions F.C. season =

Young Lions
2024–25 season
- Chairman: Sakthi Vel Ganesan
- Head coach: Nazri Nasir
- Ground: Jalan Besar Stadium
- Singapore Premier League: TBA
- Singapore Cup: TBA
- Biggest defeat: pattern_la1 = _can24h
Home colours	Away colours

The 2024–25 season was Young Lions' 21st consecutive season in the top flight of Singapore football and in the Singapore Premier League. The club also competed in the Singapore Cup.

== Season review ==
=== Pre-season ===
The 2024–25 Singapore Premier League season will be the first season to be played having a two-year schedule where Young Lions participated in the 2024 interim pre-season tournament from 24 February until 19 April. The interim pre-season tournament ensure that the players are adequately prepared for an extended new season that will span nearly 12 months. Young Lions managed to get an impressive records of wins where they had a 3 winning streak against Geylang International (5–2), Tanjong Pagar United (5–1) and Hougang United (3–2) and also drawing against Balestier Khalsa (1–1). Young Lions than play against Malaysia Super League club, Kuching City which is helms by former Young Lions head coach, Aidil Sharin Sahak on 24 March 2024 at the Geylang Training Centre in a move to improve the squad which is mostly compromise of young players. Young Lions lost 3–0 to the Malaysian side.

=== Season highlights ===
On 15 June 2024, Young Lions defeated Albirex Niigata (S) after being down 2–1 before Itsuki Enomoto and Andrew Aw scored a goal to give Young Lions a 3–2 lead which subsequently earned them the 3 points and their first ever win against Albirex Niigata (S) since 2 November 2015 in the 2015 S.League season.

== Squad ==
=== Singapore Premier League ===
As of 13 Mar 2024.

Squad No.	Name	Nationality	Date of Birth (Age)	Last Club	Contract Start	Contract End
Goalkeepers
1	Aizil Yazid	(Singapore)	24 December 2004 (age 21)	(Singapore) Hougang United	2023	2025
13	Rauf Erwan	(Singapore)	25 April 2005 (age 21)	Singapore Sports School	2022	2025
23	Travis Ang Jia Zheng	(Singapore)	23 October 2004 (age 21)	(Singapore) Tanjong Pagar United U21	2024	2025
32	Umayr Sujuandy	(Singapore)	18 February 2003 (age 23)	Singapore Sports School	2021	2025
35	Firman Nabil	(Singapore)	27 March 2005 (age 21)	(Japan) Albirex Niigata (S) U21	2024	2025
Defenders
2	Raoul Suhaimi	(Singapore)	18 September 2005 (age 20)	Singapore Sports School	2021	2025
3	Aqil Yazid	(Singapore)	9 January 2004 (age 22)	(Singapore) Balestier Khalsa U21	2023	2025
4	Ikram Mikhail Mustaqim	(Singapore)	5 August 2005 (age 21)	(Singapore) Tanjong Pagar United U21	2023	2025
5	Jun Kobayashi	(Japan)	7 May 1999 (age 27)	(Japan) Albirex Niigata (S)	2023	2025
6	Syafi Hilman	(Singapore)	27 July 2004 (age 22)	(Singapore) Lion City Sailors U21	2023	2025
14	Wong Ngang Haang	(Singapore)	3 March 2004 (age 22)	(Singapore) Hougang United U21	2024	2025
15	Kieran Teo Jia Jun	(Singapore)	6 April 2004 (age 22)	(Singapore) Geylang International U21	2023	2025
17	Iryan Fandi	(Singapore)	9 August 2006 (age 20)	(Singapore) Hougang United U21	2025	2025
19	Andrew Aw	(Singapore)	29 March 2003 (age 23)	(Singapore) BG Tampines Rovers U21	2023	2025
21	Danish Haqimi	(Singapore)	22 March 2007 (age 19)	Singapore Sports School	2023	2025
22	Febryan Pradana	(Singapore) (Indonesia)	8 February 2004 (age 22)	(Singapore) Tanjong Pagar United U21	2024	2025
25	Izz Anaqi	(Singapore)	17 August 2002 (age 23)	(Singapore) Geylang International U21	2024	2025
26	Nur Adam Abdullah	(Singapore)	13 April 2001 (age 25)	(Singapore) Lion City Sailors	2024	2025
31	Ryaan Sanizal	(Singapore)	31 May 2002 (age 24)	(Singapore) BG Tampines Rovers U21	2024	2025
40	Haziq Riduan	(Singapore)	23 May 2005 (age 21)	(Singapore) Tanjong Pagar United U21	2024	2025
41	Akash Rai	(Singapore)		(Singapore) Hougang United U17	2024	2025
49	Zaki Jumlan	(Singapore)		(Singapore) ActiveSG U17	2024	2025
53	Bill Mamadou	(Singapore) (Mali)	8 September 2001 (age 24)	(Singapore) Lion City Sailors	2025	2025
77	Danial Crichton	(Singapore) (Scotland) (Canada)	11 April 2003 (age 23)	(United States) University TRGV	2024	2025
	Ariq Rizzuwan	(Singapore)	16 March 2009 (age 17)	(Singapore) ActiveSG U17	2024	2025
Midfielders
7	Kan Kobayashi	(Japan)	27 April 1999 (age 27)	(Japan) Albirex Niigata (S)	2023	2025
8	Kaisei Ogawa	(Japan)	25 February 2001 (age 25)	(Japan) Albirex Niigata (S)	2024	2025
18	Samuel Pillai	(Singapore)	22 February 2005 (age 21)	(Australia) Fremantle City	2024	2025
20	Fairuz Fazli Koh	(Singapore)	20 January 2005 (age 21)	Singapore Sports School	2022	2025
24	Danish Qayyum	(Singapore)	2 February 2002 (age 24)	(Singapore) Lion City Sailors	2024	2025
27	Sahoo Garv	(Singapore)	26 March 2006 (age 20)	(Singapore) Balestier Khalsa U21	2023	2025
28	Ryu Hardy Yussri	(Singapore)	20 April 2005 (age 21)	Singapore Sports School	2022	2025
29	Rasul Ramli	(Singapore)	26 March 2007 (age 19)	Singapore Sports School	2023	2025
33	Ethan Henry Pinto	(Singapore)	14 October 2004 (age 21)	(Singapore) BG Tampines Rovers U21	2023	2025
45	Nyqil Iyyan	(Singapore)	26 June 2008 (age 18)	Singapore Sports School	2024	2025
46	Ikmal Hazlan	(Singapore)	2007	(Singapore) Sailors Development Center U17	2024	2025
56	Loo Kai Sheng	(Singapore)	9 January 2007 (age 19)	(Spain) ESC La Liga Academy	2024	2025
	Ajay Robson	(Singapore)	6 December 2003 (age 22)	(Singapore) Hougang United	2023	2025
Forwards
10	Amir Syafiz	(Singapore)	21 June 2004 (age 22)	Singapore Sports School	2021	2025
47	Ryan Vishal	(Singapore)	25 January 2007 (age 19)	(Singapore) Sailors Development Center U17	2024	2025
52	Lim Zheng Wu	(Singapore)	12 May 2006 (age 20)	(Singapore) BG Tampines Rovers U21	2024	2025
Players who left during the season
9	Itsuki Enomoto	(Japan)	4 June 2000 (age 26)	(Japan) Matsumoto Yamaga	2024	2025
11	Farhan Zulkifli	(Singapore)	10 November 2002 (age 23)	(Singapore) Hougang United U21	2023	2025
12	Danish Haziq	(Singapore)	12 June 2002 (age 24)	(Singapore) Geylang International U21	2024	2025
16	Fathullah Rahmat	(Singapore)	5 September 2002 (age 23)	(Singapore) Tanjong Pagar United	2024	2025
37	Rashid Hayek	(Australia)		(Australia) Western United Academy	2024	2025
42	Khairin Nadim	(Singapore)	8 May 2004 (age 22)	(Singapore) Lion City Sailors U21	2024	2025
55	Jonan Tan En Yuan	(Singapore)	27 June 2006 (age 20)	(Singapore) Lion City Sailors U21	2024	2025
Players who left for NS during season

== Coaching staff ==
Position	Name
Team Manager	(Singapore) Matthew Sean (Singapore) Sakthi Vel Ganesan
Head team coach	(Singapore) Nazri Nasir
Assistant coach	(Japan) Koichiro Iizuka (Singapore) Fadzuhasny Juraimi (Singapore) Afiq Yahya
Goalkeeping coach	(Singapore) Ahmadulhaq Che Omar
Fitness coach	(Singapore) Donald Wan
Physiotherapist	(Singapore) Vacant
Sports Trainers	(Singapore) Nasruldin Baharudin (Singapore) Muklis Sawit
Equipment Officer	(Singapore) Omar Mohamed

== Transfer ==
=== In ===
Pre-Season

Position	Player	Transferred From	Team	Ref
GK	(Singapore) Travis Ang	(Singapore) Tanjong Pagar United U21	First Team	Free.
DF	(Singapore) Haziq Riduan	(Singapore) Tanjong Pagar United U21	First Team	Free
DF	(Singapore) (Indonesia) Febryan Pradana	(Singapore) Tanjong Pagar United U21	First Team	Free
DF	(Singapore) Izz Anaqi	(Singapore) Geylang International U21	First Team	Free
DF	(Australia) Rashid Hayek	(Australia) Western United Academy	First Team	Free
DF	(Singapore) Wong Ngang Haang	(Singapore) Hougang United U21	First Team	Free
MF	(Singapore) Nyqil Iyyan	Singapore Sports School	First Team	Free
MF	(Singapore) Sahoo Garv	(Singapore) Balestier Khalsa U21	First Team	Free
MF	(Japan) Kaisei Ogawa	(Japan) Albirex Niigata (S)	First Team	Free
MF	(Singapore) Loo Kai Sheng	(Spain) ESC La Liga Academy	U17	Free
FW	(Singapore) Danish Haziq	(Singapore) Geylang International U21	First Team	Free
FW	(Japan) Itsuki Enomoto	(Japan) Matsumoto Yamaga	First Team	Free

Mid-Season

Position	Player	Transferred From	Team	Ref
DF	(Singapore) Ariq Rizzuwan	(Singapore) ActiveSG U17	U21	Free
DF	(Singapore) Zaki Jumlan	(Singapore) ActiveSG U17	U21	Free
DF	(Singapore) Ryan Vishal	(Singapore) Sailors Development Center U17	U21	Free
MF	(Singapore) Ikmal Hazlan	(Singapore) Sailors Development Center U17	U21	Free

=== Out ===
Pre-Season

Position	Player	Transferred To	Team	Ref
GK	(Singapore) Prathip Ekamparam	(Singapore) Tanjong Pagar United	First Team	Free
DF	(Singapore) Xavier Wong	(Singapore)	First Team	Free
MF	(Singapore) (Republic of Ireland) Jared Gallagher	(Singapore) BG Tampines Rovers	First Team	Free
MF	(Singapore) Syafi’ie Redzuan	(Japan) Albirex Niigata (S)	First Team	Free
MF	(Singapore) Haziq Kamarudin	(Japan) Albirex Niigata (S)	First Team	Free
FW	(Singapore) Amiruldin Asraf	(Singapore) Balestier Khalsa	First Team	Free
FW	(Singapore) Syahadat Masnawi	(Singapore) Tanjong Pagar United	First Team	Free
FW	(Singapore) Ameen Shah	(Singapore)	First Team	Free

Mid-Season

Position	Player	Transferred To	Team	Ref
DF	(Singapore) Raoul Suhaimi	(Singapore) BG Tampines Rovers	First Team	Free
DF	(Australia) Rashid Hayek	(Australia) Essendon Royals (A3)	First Team	Free
FW	(Japan) Itsuki Enomoto	(Singapore) BG Tampines Rovers	First Team	Free
FW	(Singapore) Danish Haziq	(Singapore) Kaki Bukit SC (SFL)	First Team	Free

Mid-Season

Position	Player	Transferred To	Team	Ref
FW	(Japan) Jun Kobayashi	(Japan) Kochi United	First Team	Free

=== Loan in ===
Pre-Season

Position	Player	Transferred from	Team	Ref
GK	(Singapore) Firman Nabil	(Japan) Albirex Niigata (S)	First Team	Season loan
GK	(Singapore) Aizil Yazid	(Singapore) SAFSA (Hougang)	First Team	Season loan
DF	(Singapore) Andrew Aw	(Singapore) SAFSA (Tampines)	First Team	Loan Return
DF	(Singapore) Kieran Teo Jia Jun	(Singapore) SAFSA (Geylang International)	First Team	Season loan
DF	(Singapore) Nur Adam Abdullah	(Singapore) SAFSA (Lion City Sailors)	First Team	Season loan
MF	(Singapore) Danish Qayyum	(Singapore) SAFSA (Lion City Sailors)	First Team	Season loan
MF	(Singapore) Farhan Zulkifli	(Singapore) SAFSA (Hougang United)	First Team	Season loan till Nov 2024
MF	(Singapore) Fathullah Rahmat	(Singapore) SAFSA (Tanjong Pagar United)	First Team	Season loan
FW	(Singapore) Khairin Nadim	(Singapore) SAFSA (Lion City Sailors)	First Team	Season loan till Nov 2024
FW	(Singapore) Lim Zheng Wu	(Singapore) SAFSA (via Tampines Rovers)	First Team	Season loan

Mid-Season

Position	Player	Transferred from	Team	Ref
DF	(Singapore) (Mali) Bill Mamadou	(Singapore) Lion City Sailors	First Team	Season loan
DF	(Singapore) (Scotland) Danial Crichton	(United States) University TRGV	First Team	Season loan
MF	(Singapore) Ajay Robson	(Singapore) SAFSA (Hougang United)	First Team	Season loan
DF	(Singapore) Iryan Fandi	(Singapore) SAFSA (Hougang United)	First Team	Season loan

=== Loan return ===
Pre-Season

Position	Player	Transferred To	Team	Ref
DF	(Singapore) Sahffee Jubpre	(Singapore) Hougang United	First Team	End of loan
DF	(Singapore) Ilhan Noor	(Singapore) Police SA	First Team	End of loan
MF	(Singapore) Iman Hakim	(Singapore) SAFSA	First Team	End of loan
FW	(Singapore) Ryan Praveen	(Singapore) SAFSA	First Team	End of loan
FW	(Singapore) Irfan Iskandar	(Singapore) SAFSA	First Team	End of loan
FW	(Singapore) Zikos Chua	(Singapore) Geylang International	First Team	End of loan

Mid-Season

Position	Player	Transferred To	First Team	Ref
MF	(Singapore) Farhan Zulkifli	(Singapore) Hougang United	First Team	End of NS
FW	(Singapore) Khairin Nadim	(Singapore) Lion City Sailors	First Team	End of NS
MF	(Singapore) Jonan Tan En Yuan	(Singapore) Lion City Sailors	First Team	End of NS
MF	(Singapore) Fathullah Rahmat	(Singapore) Tanjong Pagar United	First Team	End of NS

=== Loan out ===
Preseason

Position	Player	Transferred To	Team	Ref
DF	(Singapore) Raoul Suhaimi	(Singapore) SAFSA	First Team	NS till July 2025
DF	(Singapore) Aqil Yazid	(Singapore) SAFSA	First Team	NS till Jan 2026

=== Retained ===
Position	Player	Ref
DF	(Singapore) Raoul Suhaimi	
MF	(Singapore) Fairuz Fazli Koh	
MF	(Singapore) Ethan Henry Pinto	

== Friendly ==
=== Pre-season friendly ===
Win Draw Loss

2024 SPL Interim Tournament – 23 Feb to 21 Apr

24 February 2024 1	Young Lions (Singapore)	1–4	(Singapore) BG Tampines Rovers	Tampines
	Itsuki Enomoto 20'	Report	Boris Kopitović 39' (pen.); Shuya Yamashita 43'; Miloš Zlatković 70'; Saifullah Akbar 78' (pen.)	Stadium: Our Tampines Hub; Referee: Clarence Leow

1 March 2024 2	Young Lions (Singapore)	5–2	(Singapore) Geylang International	Jalan Bear
	Itsuki Enomoto 34', 45', 56'; Farhan Zulkifli 64'; Amir Syafiz 76'		Hud Ismail 63'; Christo Chua 90+3'	Stadium: Jalan Bear Stadium

10 March 2024 3	Young Lions (Singapore)	5–1	(Singapore) Tanjong Pagar United	Jalan Besar
	Danish Qayyum 20'; Farhan Zulkifli 25', 49'; Amir Syafiz 68' (pen.); Fathullah Rahmat 86' (pen.)		Rezza Rezky 11'	Stadium: Jalan Besar Stadium

14 April 2024 4	Young Lions (Singapore)	3–2	(Singapore) Hougang United	Jalan Besar
	Itsuki Enomoto 37'; Farhan Zulkifli 41'; Amir Syafiz 83'		Ensar Brunčević 51'; Gabriel Quak 90+1'	Stadium: Jalan Besar Stadium

19 April 2024 5	Young Lions (Singapore)	1–1	(Singapore) Balestier Khalsa	Bishan
	69'		Riku Fukashiro 14'	Stadium: Bishan Stadium

Others

24 April 2024	Young Lions (Singapore)	0–3	(Malaysia) Kuching City	Geylang
				Stadium: Geylang Training Centre

3 May 2024	Young Lions (Singapore)	v	Singapore Cricket Club	Geylang
				Stadium: Geylang Training Centre

17 November 2024	JDT III (Malaysia)	3–3	(Singapore) Young Lions	Johor
	Danish Presenti 67'; Naim Zainudin 76'; Raziq Rahman 90'

== Team statistics ==
=== Appearances and goals (SPL) ===
As of 19 May 2025

Numbers in parentheses denote appearances as substitute.

No.	Pos.	Player	Sleague		Singapore Cup		Total	
No.	Pos.	Player	Apps.	Goals	Apps.	Goals	Apps.	Goals
1	GK	(Singapore) Aizil Yazid	19+1	0	1	0	21	0
2	DF	(Singapore) Raoul Suhaimi	13+4	0	4	0	21	0
3	DF	(Singapore) Aqil Yazid	18+2	0	2+1	0	23	0
4	DF	(Singapore) Ikram Mikhail Mustaqim	4+6	0	1+1	0	12	0
5	DF	(Japan) Jun Kobayashi	28+1	3	3+1	1	33	4
6	DF	(Singapore) Syafi Hilman	6+6	0	0+2	0	14	0
7	MF	(Japan) Kan Kobayashi	30	7	4	2	34	9
8	MF	(Japan) Kaisei Ogawa	32	2	4	5	36	7
10	MF	(Singapore) Amir Syafiz	16+11	6	4	1	31	7
12	FW	(Singapore) Danish Haziq	0	0	0	0	0	0
13	GK	(Singapore) Rauf Erwan	2	0	1	0	3	0
14	DF	(Singapore) Wong Ngang Haang	0	0	0	0	0	0
15	DF	(Singapore) Kieran Teo Jia Jun	13+1	1	0	0	14	1
17	DF	(Singapore) Iryan Fandi	1+2	0	0+1	0	4	0
18	DF	(Singapore) Samuel Pillai	0+1	0	0	0	1	0
19	DF	(Singapore) Andrew Aw	13+14	1	3+1	0	31	1
20	MF	(Singapore) Fairuz Fazli Koh	12+3	1	3+1	1	19	2
21	DF	(Singapore) Danish Haqimi	2+3	0	0+1	0	6	0
22	DF	(Singapore) (Indonesia) Febryan Pradana	0	0	0	0	0	0
23	GK	(Singapore) Travis Ang	5	0	0	0	5	0
24	MF	(Singapore) Danish Qayyum	15+6	3	2+1	0	24	3
25	DF	(Singapore) Izz Anaqi	0	0	0	0	0	0
26	DF	(Singapore) Nur Adam Abdullah	18+2	0	1	0	21	0
27	MF	(Singapore) Sahoo Garv	0+3	0	0	0	3	0
28	MF	(Singapore) Ryu Hardy Yussri	6+5	0	1+1	0	13	0
29	MF	(Singapore) Rasul Ramli	2+2	0	0	0	4	0
31	DF	(Singapore) Ryaan Sanizal	12+3	0	2	0	17	0
32	GK	(Singapore) Umayr Sujuandy	5	0	2	0	7	0
33	MF	(Singapore) Ethan Henry Pinto	11+5	1	2+2	0	20	1
35	GK	(Singapore) Firman Nabil	1	0	0	0	1	0
45	MF	(Singapore) Nyqil Iyyan	1+6	0	0	0	7	0
47	DF	(Singapore) Ryan Vishal	0+7	0	0+2	0	9	0
52	FW	(Singapore) Lim Zheng Wu	2+3	0	0	0	5	0
53	DF	(Singapore) (Mali) Bill Mamadou	6+2	0	3	0	11	0
77	DF	(Singapore) (Scotland) Danial Scott Crichton	2+2	0	0+1	0	5	0
??	MF	(Singapore) Ajay Robson	0	0	0	0	0	0
Players who have played this season and/or sign for the season but had left the club or on loan to other club
9	FW	(Japan) Itsuki Enomoto	19	13	0	0	19	13
11	MF	(Singapore) Farhan Zulkifli	13+5	4	0	0	18	4
16	MF	(Singapore) Fathullah Rahmat	11+7	1	1+3	0	22	1
37	DF	(Australia) Rashid Hayek	2+1	0	0	0	3	0
42	FW	(Singapore) Khairin Nadim	9+7	1	0	0	16	1
55	MF	(Singapore) Jonan Tan En Yuan	5+5	0	0	0	10	0

== Competitions ==
=== Overview ===
Results summary (SPL)

Overall								Home						Away					
Pld	W	D	L	GF	GA	GD	Pts	W	D	L	GF	GA	GD	W	D	L	GF	GA	GD
0	0	0	0	0	0	0	0	0	0	0	0	0	0	0	0	0	0	0	0

=== Singapore Premier League ===
Win Draw Loss

11 May 2024 1	Young Lions (Singapore)	1–2	(Brunei) DPMM	Jalan Besar
	Farhan Zulkifli 20'; Amir Syafiz (yellow card) 75'; Ethan Pinto (yellow card) 90+4'		Miguel Oliveira 22'; Yura Indera Putera Yunos 38'; Farshad Noor (yellow card) 84'	Stadium: Jalan Besar Stadium; Referee: Clarence Leow; Man of the Match: (Portugal) Miguel Oliveira

18 May 2024 2	Lion City Sailors (Singapore)	3–1	(Singapore) Young Lions	Bishan
	Maxime Lestienne 18'; Shawal Anuar 24'; Bart Ramselaar 57'; Bailey Wright (red card) 45+3'		Farhan Zulkifli 64'; Fairuz Fazli Koh (yellow card) 15'; Raoul Suhaimi (yellow card) 59'	Stadium: Bishan Stadium; Referee: Hilmi Fuad; Man of the Match: (Netherlands) Bart Ramselaar

25 May 2024 3	Geylang International (Singapore)	7–1	(Singapore) Young Lions	Jalan Besar
	Ryoya Tanigushi 13'; Sora Tanaka 18' (yellow card) 71'; Tomoyuki Doi 54', 66', 89'; Vincent Bezecourt 79'; Takahiro Tezuka 82'; Hairul Syirhan (yellow card) 57'		Itsuki Enomoto 59' (pen.); Fathullah Rahmat (yellow card) 53'; Khairin Nadim (yellow card) 80'	Stadium: Jalan Besar Stadium; Referee: Jansen Foo; Man of the Match: (Japan) Tomoyuki Doi

15 June 2024 4	Young Lions (Singapore)	3–2	(Japan) Albirex Niigata (S)	Jalan Besar
	SteviaEgbus Mikuni 40' (o.g.); Itsuki Enomoto 79'; Andrew Aw 87'; Raoul Suhaimi (red card) 55'; Kieran Teo Jia Jun (yellow card) 67'; Aqil Yazid (yellow card) 74'		Shingo Nakano 28', 58'; Shuhei Hoshino (yellow card) 44'	Stadium: Jalan Besar Stadium; Referee: Syarqawi Buhari; Man of the Match: (Singapore) Azil Yazid

22 June 2024 5	Young Lions (Singapore)	3–2	(Singapore) Tanjong Pagar United	Jalan Besar
	Amir Syafiz 45'; Khairin Nadim 55'; Itsuki Enomoto 82'; Danish Qayyum (yellow card) 42'; Farhan Zulkifli (yellow card) 52'; Nur Adam Abdullah (yellow card) 72'		Sahil Suhaimi 25'; Salif Cissé 40'	Stadium: Jalan Besar Stadium; Referee: Taufik Thana; Man of the Match: (Japan) Itsuki Enomoto

29 June 2024 6	Balestier Khalsa (Singapore)	3–2	(Singapore) Young Lions	Bishan
	Alen Kozar 20', 56'; Masahiro Sugita 65'		Itsuki Enomoto 9', 85' (yellow card) 12'; Andrew Aw (yellow card) 41'; Kaisei Ogawa (yellow card) 61'; Khairin Nadim (yellow card) 62'; Kan Kobayashi (yellow card) 87'	Stadium: Bishan Stadium; Referee: Hilmi Fuad; Man of the Match: (Slovenia) Alen Kozar

6 July 2024 7	Young Lions (Singapore)	0–2	(Singapore) BG Tampines Rovers	Jalan Besar
	Kieran Teo Jia Jun (yellow card) 35'; Nur Adam Abdullah (yellow card) 79'		Seia Kunori 5'; Boris Kopitović 50' (pen.); Kyoga Nakamura (yellow card) 20'; Shah Shahiran (yellow card) 53'	Stadium: Jalan Besar Stadium; Referee: Clarence Leow; Man of the Match: (Japan) Seia Kunori

14 July 2024 8	Hougang United (Singapore)	2–2	(Singapore) Young Lions	Jalan Besar
	Hazzuwan Halim 47'; Nur Adam Abdullah 79' (o.g.); Ismail Salihovic (yellow card) 36'; Jordan Vestering (yellow card) 63'; Nazrul Nazari (yellow card) 67'; Ajay Robson (yellow card) 84'		Jun Kobayashi 31'; Itsuki Enomoto 67'	Stadium: Jalan Besar Stadium; Referee: Farhan Mohd; Man of the Match: (Japan) Jun Kobayashi

22 July 2024 9	Young Lions (Singapore)	0–6	(Singapore) Lion City Sailors	Jalan Besar
	Ryaan Sanizal (yellow card) 27'		Shawal Anuar 2', 32'; Maxime Lestienne 55'; Song Ui-young 64'; Lennart Thy 69'; Haiqal Pashia 90+3'	Stadium: Jalan Besar Stadium; Referee: Zulfiqar Bin Mustaffa; Man of the Match: (Singapore) Shawal Anuar

27 July 2024 10	DPMM (Brunei)	1–3	(Singapore) Young Lions	Jalan Besar
	Hakeme 32' (pen.); Azwan Ali Rahman (yellow card) 38'; Farshad Noor (yellow card) 85'; Abdul Mu'iz Sisa (yellow card) 90+6'		Itsuki Enomoto 2', 77' (yellow card) 64'; Farhan Zulkifli 51'; Fathullah Rahmat (yellow card) 45+1'; Ryaan Sanizal (yellow card) 90+1'	Stadium: Jalan Besar Stadium (Note: Match location changed due to Radio Television Brunei not able to broadcast the match); Referee: Syarqawi Buhari; Man of the Match: (Japan) Itsuki Enomoto

4 August 2024 11	Albirex Niigata (S) (Japan)	2–1	(Singapore) Young Lions	Jurong East
	Shingo Nakano 2' (yellow card) 40'; Shuhei Hoshino 63'; Syed Firdaus Hassan (yellow card) 6'; Ho Wai Loon (yellow card) 44'; Daniel Goh (yellow card) 57'		SteviaEgbus Mikuni 55' (o.g.); Fathullah Rahmat (yellow card) 8'; Kieran Teo Jia Jun (yellow card) 15'; Kan Kobayashi (yellow card) 44'	Stadium: Jurong East Stadium; Referee: Farhan Mohd; Man of the Match: (Japan) Koki Kawachi

10 August 2024 12	Young Lions (Singapore)	0–3	(Singapore) Geylang International	Jalan Besar
			Tomoyuki Doi 12', 71'; Vincent Bezecourt 77'	Stadium: Jalan Besar Stadium; Referee: Ahmad A'Qashah; Man of the Match: (Japan) Tomoyuki Doi

24 August 2024 13	Tanjong Pagar United (Singapore)	1–3	(Singapore) Young Lions	Jurong East
	Shodai Nishikawa 36'; Salif Cissé (yellow card) 60'		Jun Kobayashi 6'; Danish Qayyum 41'; Kieran Teo Jia Jun 54'; Itsuki Enomoto (yellow card) 75'	Stadium: Jurong East Stadium; Referee: Clarence Leow; Man of the Match: (Singapore) Danish Qayyum

31 August 2024 14	Young Lions (Singapore)	2–7	(Singapore) Balestier Khalsa	Jalan Besar
	Itsuki Enomoto 34' (pen.); Farhan Zulkifli 66'; Raoul Suhaimi (yellow card) 41'; Aqil Yazid (yellow card) 47'		Alen Kozar 10'; Ignatius Ang 22', 64'; Ismail Sassi 57', 76', 78'; Madhu Mohana 90+3'	Stadium: Jalan Besar Stadium; Referee: Zulfiqar Mustaffa; Man of the Match: (Tunisia) (France) Ismail Sassi

14 September 2024 15	BG Tampines Rovers (Singapore)	2–2	(Singapore) Young Lions	Jalan Besar
	Kaisei Ogawa 20'; Itsuki Enomoto 50'; Ryaan Sanizal (yellow card) 7'; Syafi Hilman (yellow card) 70'; Aizil Yazid (yellow card) 90+5'		Joel Chew 61'; Miloš Zlatković 77'	Stadium: Jalan Besar Stadium; Referee: Andrea Verolino; Man of the Match: (Japan) Kaisei Ogawa

21 September 2024 16	Young Lions (Singapore)	4–4	(Singapore) Hougang United	Jalan Besar
	Kan Kobayashi 9', 83'; Fathullah Rahmat 34'; Itsuki Enomoto 77' (pen.)		Shodai Yokoyama 11'; Dejan Račić 19', 45'; Stjepan Plazonja 45+7'; Jordan Vestering (yellow card) 88'; Petar Banović (yellow card) 88'	Stadium: Jalan Besar Stadium; Referee: Clarence Leow; Man of the Match: (Singapore) Fathullah Rahmat

18 October 2024 17	DPMM (Brunei)	0–3	(Singapore) Young Lions	Bandar Seri Begawan
			Itsuki Enomoto 57', 68'; Fairuz Fazli Koh 65'; Kan Kobayashi (penalty missed) 18; Raoul Suhaimi (yellow card) 13'	Stadium: Hassanal Bolkiah National Stadium; Referee: Farhan Mohd; Man of the Match: (Japan) Itsuki Enomoto

30 April 2024 18 (Rescheduled)	Lion City Sailors (Singapore)	3–1	(Singapore) Young Lions	Tampines
	Bart Ramselaar 13'; Shawal Anuar 45+2'; Maxime Lestienne 77'; Lionel Tan (yellow card) 16'; Ali Al Rina (yellow card) 32'; Diogo Costa (yellow card) 46'		Jun Kobayashi 19'; Andrew Aw (yellow card) 39'; Fathullah Rahmat (yellow card) 75'	Stadium: Our Tampines Hub (Note: Match rescheduled and location changed to Our Tampines Hub due to General Election 2025 and potential closures of selected ActiveSG facilities, including stadiums that are typically used for SPL fixtures); Referee: Farhan Mohd; Man of the Match: (Singapore) Izwan Mahbud

3 November 2024 19	Geylang International (Singapore)	4–0	(Singapore) Young Lions	Jalan Besar
	Shakir Hamzah 34'; Tomoyuki Doi 50', 73', 88'; Akmal Azman (yellow card) 37'			Stadium: Jalan Besar Stadium; Referee: Oswind Suriya; Man of the Match: (Japan) Tomoyuki Doi

23 November 2024 20 (Rescheduled)	Young Lions (Singapore)	0–1	(Japan) Albirex Niigata (S)	Jalan Besar
	Nyqil Iyyan (yellow card) 27'; Nazri Nasir (red card) 43'; Itsuki Enomoto (yellow card) 62'		Arya Igami Tarhani 77'; Arshad Shamim (yellow card) 90+2'	Stadium: Jalan Besar Stadium; Referee: Andrea Verolino; Man of the Match: (Japan) (Iran) Arya Igami Tarhani

18 January 2025 21	Young Lions (Singapore)	1–1	(Singapore) Tanjong Pagar United	Jalan Besar
	Kaisei Ogawa 53' (pen.)		Sahil Suhaimi 74' (yellow card) 90+4'; Shahrin Saberin (yellow card) 52'	Stadium: Jalan Besar Stadium; Referee: Farhan Mohd; Man of the Match: (Timor-Leste) Zenivio

25 January 2025 22	Balestier Khalsa (Singapore)	2–3	(Singapore) Young Lions	Bishan
	Anton Fase 48'; Ignatius Ang 53'		Kan Kobayashi 23'; Amir Syafiz 38'; Ethan Pinto 89' (yellow card) 45+1'; Danish Qayyum (yellow card) 90'	Stadium: Bishan Stadium; Referee: Hilmi Fuad; Man of the Match: (Japan) Kan Kobayashi

8 February 2025 23	Young Lions (Singapore)	1–5	(Singapore) BG Tampines Rovers	Jalan Besar
	Amir Syafiz 51'		Miloš Zlatković 21'; Glenn Kweh 37'; Itsuki Enomoto 59'; Ethan Pinto 69' (o.g.); Amirul Adli 71'; Nanthiphat Chaiman (yellow card) 79'; Dylan Fox (yellow card) 89'	Stadium: Jalan Besar Stadium; Referee: Farhan Mohd; Man of the Match: (Singapore) Glenn Kweh

22 February 2025 24	Hougang United (Singapore)	3–3	(Singapore) Young Lions	Jalan Besar
	Daniel Alemão 8'; Dejan Račić 32'; Farhan Zulkifli 71'; Tajeli Salamat (yellow card) 4'; Anders Aplin (yellow card) 38'		Danish Qayyum 5'; Amir Syafiz 23', 44'	Stadium: Jalan Besar Stadium; Referee: Zulfiqar Mustaffa; Man of the Match: (Singapore) Fairuz Fazli

8 March 2025 25	Young Lions (Singapore)	1–1	(Brunei) DPMM	Jalan Besar
	Danish Qayyum 24'; Ryu Hardy Yussri (yellow card) 89'		Gabriel Gama 78'; Miguel Oliveira (yellow card) 57'	Stadium: Jalan Besar Stadium; Referee: Zulfiqar Mustaffa; Man of the Match: (Japan) Jun Kobayashi

6 April 2025 26	Young Lions (Singapore)	0–8	(Singapore) Lion City Sailors	Jalan Besar
	Umayr Sujuandy (red card) 25'		Ikram Mikhail Mustaqim 11' (o.g.); Bart Ramselaar 14'; Lennart Thy 25', 44', 60', 90', 90+1'; Song Ui-young 58'; Toni Datković (yellow card) 35'	Stadium: Jalan Besar Stadium; Referee: Syarqawi Buhari; Man of the Match: (Germany) Lennart Thy

13 April 2025 27	Albirex Niigata (S) (Japan)	0–0	(Singapore) Young Lions	Jurong East
	Syed Firdaus Hassan (yellow card) 53'		Andrew Aw (yellow card) 19'	Stadium: Jurong East Stadium; Referee: Hilmi Fuad; Man of the Match: (Singapore) Rauf Erwan

15 May 2025 28 (Rescheduled)	Young Lions (Singapore)	1–2	(Singapore) Geylang International	Jalan Besar
	Kan Kobayashi 45+1'; Bill Mamadou (yellow card) 90+1'		Rio Sakuma 65' (yellow card) 81'; Ryoya Taniguchi 90'	Stadium: Jalan Besar Stadium; Referee: Clarence Leow; Man of the Match: (Japan) Ryoya Taniguchi

7 May 2025 29 (Rescheduled)	Tanjong Pagar United (Singapore)	1–1	(Singapore) Young Lions	Jurong East
	Salif Cissé 45'; Shahrin Saberin (yellow card) 20'; Izrafil Yusof (yellow card) 30'		Raihan Rahman 83' (o g.); Bill Mamadou (yellow card) 85'	Stadium: Jurong East Stadium; Referee: Zulfiqar Mustaffa; Man of the Match: (Mali) (France) Salif Cissé

3 May 2025 30	Young Lions (Singapore)	0–4	(Singapore) Balestier Khalsa	Tampines
	Amir Syafiz (yellow card) 28' (yellow-red card) 59'; Ryu Hardy Yussri (yellow card) 52'		Kodai Tanaka 4'; Ignatius Ang 40', 41'; Anton Fase 69'; Jared Gallagher (yellow card) 49'; Fudhil I’yadh (yellow card) 54'; Elijah Lim Teck Yong (yellow card) 78'	Stadium: Our Tampines Hub (Note: Location changed to Our Tampines Hub due to General Election 2025 and potential closures of selected ActiveSG facilities, including stadiums that are typically used for SPL fixtures); Man of the Match: (Singapore) Ignatius Ang

10 May 2025 31	BG Tampines Rovers (Singapore)	2–0	(Singapore) Young Lions	Jalan Besar
	Itsuki Enomoto 10'; Kyoga Nakamura 60'; Miloš Zlatković (yellow card) 88'			Stadium: Jalan Besar Stadium; Referee: Hilmi Fuad; Man of the Match: (Japan) Kyoga Nakamura

19 May 2025 32 (Rescheduled)	Young Lions (Singapore)	4–3	(Singapore) Hougang United	Jalan Besar
	Amir Syafiz 21'; Kan Kobayashi 73', 90+3', 90+6'; Danish Haqimi (yellow card) 19'; Ikram Mikhail Mustaqim (yellow card) 59'; Jun Kobayashi (red card) 75'; Ryu Hardy Yussri (yellow card) 85'		Stjepan Plazonja 16'; Shodai Yokoyama 59'; Dejan Račić 88'; Nazhiim Harman (yellow card) 6'; Nazrul Nazari (yellow card) 61'; Zulfahmi Arifin (yellow card) 70'; Parinya Kaochukiat (yellow card) 79'	Stadium: Jalan Besar Stadium; Referee: Oswind Suriya; Man of the Match: (Japan) Kan Kobayashi

Pos	Team	Pld	W	D	L	GF	GA	GD	Pts	Qualification or relegation
1	Lion City Sailors (C)	32	22	6	4	96	32	+64	72	Qualification for Champions League Two group stage & ASEAN Club Championship (Note: Since the winners of the 2024–25 Singapore Cup, Lion City Sailors, had already qualified for the AFC Champions League Two and ASEAN Club Championship, the spot given to the Singapore Cup winners (Champions League Two) was passed to the second-placed team.)
2	BG Tampines Rovers	32	19	7	6	84	37	+47	64	Qualification for Champions League Two group stage & ASEAN Club Championship
3	Geylang International	32	15	9	8	97	64	+33	54	
4	Balestier Khalsa	32	14	6	12	84	80	+4	48	
5	DPMM (Note: Ineligible for AFC competition spots)	32	12	8	12	54	61	−7	44	Transferred to the 2025–26 Malaysia Super League post-season
6	Albirex Niigata (S)	32	13	3	16	55	71	−16	42	
7	Hougang United	32	7	10	15	61	76	−15	31	
8	Young Lions	32	7	8	17	47	89	−42	29	
9	Tanjong Pagar United	32	3	7	22	35	103	−68	16	

Updated to match(es) played on 25 May 2025. Source: Singapore Premier League
Rules for classification: 1) points; 2) goal difference; 3) number of goals scored; 4) number of wins
(C) Champions

=== Singapore Cup ===
Pos	Team	Pld	W	D	L	GF	GA	GD	Pts	Qualification
1	BG Tampines Rovers	4	3	1	0	12	4	+8	10	Semi-finals
2	DPMM	4	2	1	1	7	7	0	7	Semi-finals
3	Young Lions	4	2	0	2	11	7	+4	6	
4	Hougang United	4	2	0	2	8	10	−2	6	
5	Albirex Niigata (S)	4	0	0	4	4	14	−10	0	

Source: FAS

15 February 2025 Group Match 1	Young Lions (Singapore)	0–2	(Brunei) DPMM FC	Jalan Besar
	Aizil Yazid (red card) 95'		Dāvis Ikaunieks 8' (pen.); Miguel Oliveira 71'; Nazirrudin Ismail (yellow card) 15'; Kristijan Naumovski (yellow card) 35'; Najib Tarif (yellow card) 63'	Stadium: Jalan Besar Stadium; Referee: Ahmad A'Qashah

1 March 2025 Group Match 2	Hougang United (Singapore)	0–3	(Singapore) Young Lions	Jalan Besar
	Nazrul Nazari (yellow card) 45+3'; Zaiful Nizam (red card) 45+3'		Fairuz Fazli Koh 16'; Kaisei Ogawa 45+4' (pen.); Nazrul Nazari 53' (o.g.)	Stadium: Jalan Besar Stadium; Referee: Farhan Mohd

16 March 2025 Group Match 3	BG Tampines Rovers (Singapore)	4–1	(Singapore) Young Lions	Jalan Besar
	Itsuki Enomoto 20', 32'; Shah Shahiran 22'; Joel Chew 47'; Taufik Suparno (yellow card) 67'; Dylan Fox (yellow card) 90+6'		Jun Kobayashi 66'	Stadium: Jalan Besar Stadium; Referee: Ahmad A'Qashah

28 March 2025 Group Match 4	Young Lions (Singapore)	7–1	(Japan) Albriex Niigata (S)	Jalan Besar
	Kaisei Ogawa 5', 21', 58', 66'; Kan Kobayashi 12', 80'; Amir Syafiz 61'; Fairuz Fazli Koh (yellow card) 78'		Daniel Goh 9'; Gareth Low (yellow card) 26' (yellow-red card); SteviaEgbus Mikuni (yellow card) 29'	Stadium: Jalan Besar Stadium; Referee: Oswind Suriya
