= Singapore national under-21 football team =

National association football team

Singapore U-21
- Nickname: Young Lions
- Association: Football Association of Singapore
- Confederation: AFC (Asia)
- Sub-confederation: AFF (Southeast Asia)
- Head coach: Tsutomu Ogura
- Home stadium: Jalan Besar Stadium, Singapore
- FIFA code: SIN
First colours	Second colours

The Singapore national under-21 football team is an under-21 football team representing Singapore.

== History ==
Fandi Ahmad was unveiled as the FAS’ new head coach, youth, during a press conference at Jalan Besar Stadium on 4 October 2016 and will take charge of the youth teams headed for the 2018 Asian Games, the 2019 and 2021 SEA Games, as well as the 2020 Olympics.

He will focus on players who are within the 19 to 23 age bracket and report to FAS technical director Michel Sablon. It was reported that he has an option to extend his contract for another three years in 2019, provided both parties are happy with the progress that has been made by then.

== Players ==
The following players were called up for the friendly match against Albirex Niigata (S) on 24 September 2022.

No.	Pos.	Player	Date of birth (age)	Caps	Goals	Club
	GK	Aizil Yazid	24 December 2004 (age 21)	0	0	(Singapore) Hougang United
	GK	Daniel Iliya	6 February 2003 (age 23)	0	0	(Singapore) Tampines Rovers
	DF	Ilhan Noor	19 December 2002 (age 23)	0	0	(Football Association of Malaysia) Sri Pahang
	DF	Nur Adam Abdullah	8 September 2001 (age 25)	0	0	(Singapore) Lion City Sailors
	DF	Bill Mamadou	8 September 2001 (age 25)	0	0	(Singapore) Lion City Sailors
	DF	Andrew Aw	29 March 2003 (age 23)	0	0	(Singapore) Tampines Rovers
	DF	Jordan Emaviwe	9 April 2001 (age 25)	0	0	(Football Association of Singapore) Young Lions
	DF	Harhys Stewart	20 March 2001 (age 25)	0	0	(Football Association of Singapore) Young Lions
	MF	Aidil Johari	5 April 2003 (age 23)	0	0	(Football Association of Malaysia) Sri Pahang
	MF	Farhan Zulkifli	10 November 2002 (age 23)	0	0	(Singapore) Hougang United
	MF	Iman Hakim	9 March 2002 (age 24)	0	0	(Singapore) Tampines Rovers
	MF	Ong Yu En	3 October 2003 (age 23)	0	0	(South Korea) Incheon United
	MF	Fathullah Rahmat	5 September 2002 (age 24)	0	0	(South Korea) Suwon Samsung Bluewings
	MF	Jared Gallagher	18 January 2002 (age 24)	0	0	(Football Association of Singapore) Young Lions
	MF	Elijah Lim Teck Yong	8 May 2001 (age 25)	0	0	(Football Association of Singapore) Young Lions
	FW	Nicky Melvin Singh	16 June 2002 (age 24)	0	0	(Japan Football Association) Albirex Niigata (S)
	FW	Zamani Zamri	31 May 2001 (age 25)	1	0	(Japan Football Association) Albirex Niigata (S)
	FW	Ryan Praveen	28 May 2002 (age 24)	0	0	(Football Association of Singapore) Balestier Khalsa
	FW	Abdul Rasaq	16 June 2001 (age 25)	0	0	(Football Association of Singapore) Lion City Sailors
