= Elijah Lim =

Singaporean footballer (born 2001)

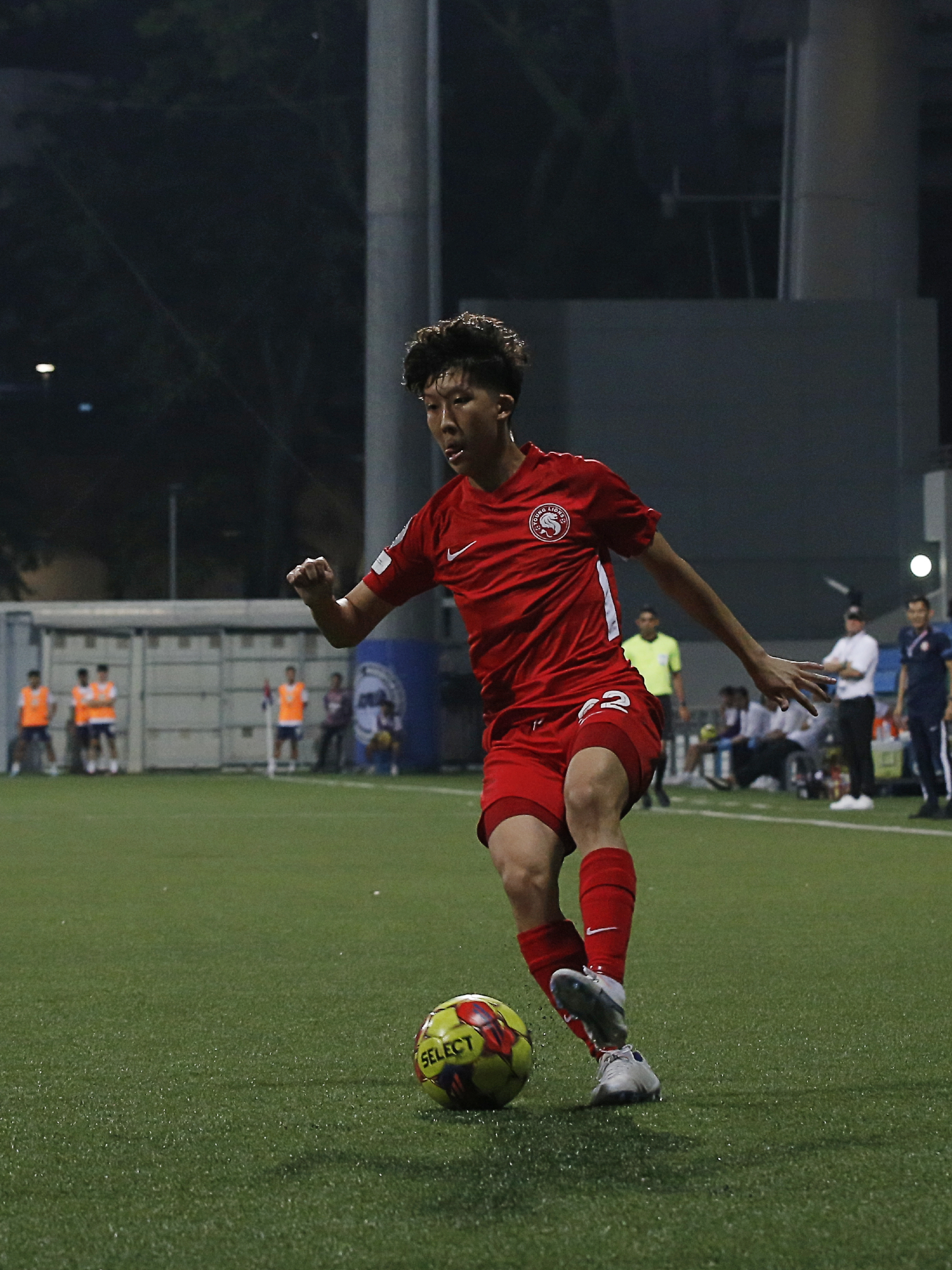
- Elijah playing for Young Lions in 2023

Personal information
- Full name: Elijah Lim Teck Yong
- Date of birth: 8 May 2001 (age 25)
- Place of birth: Singapore
- Positions: Winger; midfielder

Team information
- Current team: Balestier Khalsa
- Number: 14

Senior career*
Years	Team	Apps	(Gls)
2018-2019	Tampines Rovers	2	(0)
2020	Balestier Khalsa	5	(0)
2021–2023	Geylang International	13	(0)
2022–2023	Young Lions	28	(3)
2023–	Balestier Khalsa	26	(3)

International career
2023–	Singapore U23	4	(0)
- * Club domestic league appearances and goals as of 15 May 2026

Elijah Lim Teck Yong (born 8 May 2001) is a Singaporean professional footballer currently playing as a midfielder for Singapore Premier League club Balestier Khalsa. Able to play in wide positions, Elijah has appeared as a central midfielder, left midfielder and left winger in his career, making him a versatile player.

== Club career ==
=== Youth ===
Elijah studied at the Singapore Sports School where he play for the school team. In 2016, he was chosen for a week-long training stint with Japanese club, Matsumoto Yamaga where he trained with the academies players.

=== Tampines Rovers ===
On 3 January 2018, Elijah signed his first professional contract with Singapore Premier League club, Tampines Rovers from Singapore Sports School.

=== Balestier Khalsa ===
Elijah signed with Balestier Khalsa at the start of the 2020 Singapore Premier League season but only made 5 appearances before having his contract mutually terminated due to COVID-19.

=== Geylang International ===
Elijah signed with Geylang International ahead of the 2021 Singapore Premier League season. He had a 37% tackle rate for his team in the Singapore Premier League, the highest in Geylang.

He soon left the club in September 2021 to serve national service.

=== Young Lions ===
Elijah then joined Young Lions ahead of the 2022 Singapore Premier League season where he also underwent his compulsory National Service. He scored his first goal for the Young Lions in a 4–4 draw against his former club, Balestier Khalsa, with the goal also being his first professional goal in his career. Elijah came close to scoring again in a 2–2 draw to Brunei DPMM during the 2023 season but saw the ball rebound off the crossbar. During the 4–3 defeat to Tanjong Pagar United, Lim was involved with all 3 goals scored by the Young Lions as he scored two goals from close range and was integral in the build up to the third goal. However his team came short as they lost in dramatic fashion to a late goal.

He departed the team following his completion of national service and remained as a free agent until October.

=== Return to Balestier Khalsa ===
On 19 October 2023, Balestier Khalsa announced the return of Elijah to the club which he will don the number 49.

== International career ==
=== Youth ===
Elijah made his Singapore U23 debut in a 1–0 lost to Hong Kong in the 2023 Merlion Cup. Elijah was then selected for the 25-man preliminary squad for the upcoming 2023 SEA Games later in the year.

== Career statistics ==
=== Club ===
As of 15 May 2026.

Club	Season	League			Cup		Continental		Other		Total	
Club	Season	Division	Apps	Goals	Apps	Goals	Apps	Goals	Apps	Goals	Apps	Goals
Tampines Rovers	2018	Singapore Premier League	0	0	0	0	0	0	0	0	0	0
Tampines Rovers	2019	Singapore Premier League	2	0	0	0	0	0	0	0	2	0
Tampines Rovers	Total		2	0	0	0	0	0	0	0	2	0
Balestier Khalsa	2020	Singapore Premier League	5	0	0	0	0	0	0	0	5	0
Geylang International	2021	Singapore Premier League	13	0	0	0	0	0	0	0	13	0
Young Lions	2022	Singapore Premier League	13	1	3	0	0	0	0	0	16	1
Young Lions	2023	Singapore Premier League	15	2	0	0	0	0	0	0	15	2
Young Lions	Total		28	3	3	0	0	0	0	0	31	3
Balestier Khalsa	2023	Singapore Premier League	0	0	1	0	0	0	0	0	1	0
Balestier Khalsa	2024–25	Singapore Premier League	10	1	3	0	0	0	0	0	13	1
Balestier Khalsa	2025–26	Singapore Premier League	16	2	5	0	0	0	0	0	21	2
Balestier Khalsa	Total		26	3	9	0	0	0	0	0	35	3
Career total			74	6	12	0	0	0	0	0	86	6

== International statistics ==
=== U23 International caps ===
No	Date	Venue	Opponent	Result	Competition
1	24 March 2023	Jalan Besar Stadium, Jalan Besar, Singapore	Hong Kong	0–1 (lost)	Friendly
2	29 April 2023	Prince Stadium, Phnom Penh, Cambodia	Thailand	1–3 (lost)	2023 SEA Games
3	3 May 2023	Prince Stadium, Phnom Penh, Cambodia	Vietnam	1–3 (lost)	2023 SEA Games
4	6 May 2023	Prince Stadium, Phnom Penh, Cambodia	Laos	0–0 (draw)	2023 SEA Games
5	11 May 2023	Prince Stadium, Phnom Penh, Cambodia	Malaysia	0-7 (lost)	2023 SEA Games

== Honours ==
Tampines Rovers

- Singapore Cup: 2019
