= Amir Syafiz =

Singaporean footballer

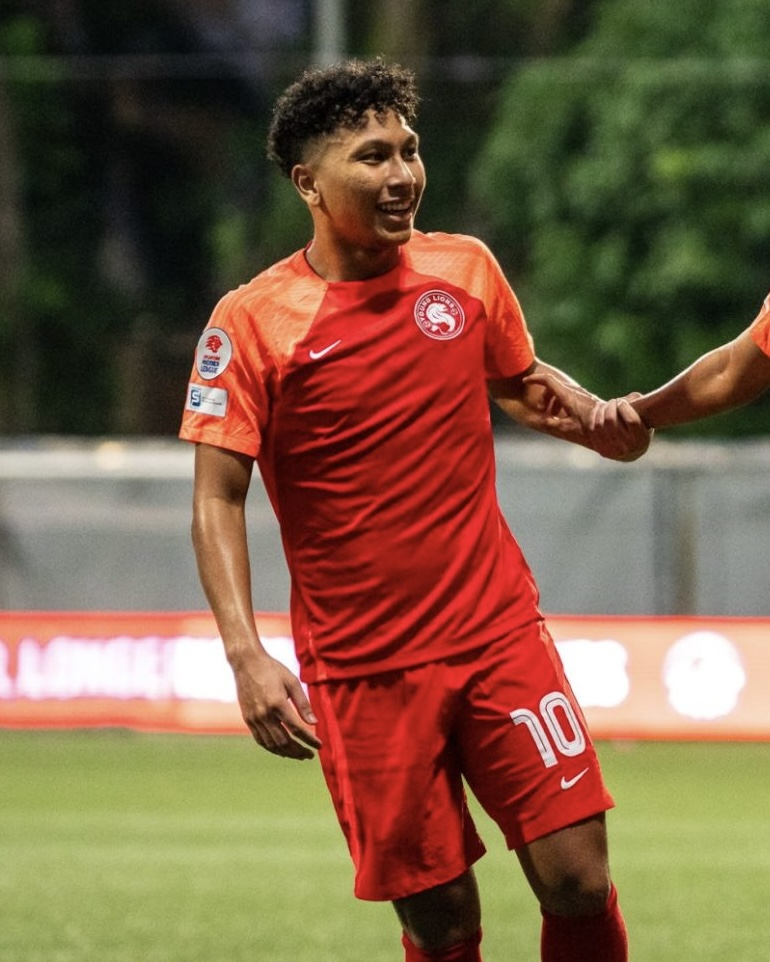
- Amir playing for Young Lions in 2025

Personal information
- Full name: Amir Syafiz bin Abdul Rashid
- Date of birth: 21 June 2004 (age 22)
- Place of birth: Singapore
- Height: 1.68 m (5 ft 6 in)
- Positions: Striker; attacking midfielder

Team information
- Current team: Hougang United

Youth career
- Zhenghua Primary School
- –2020: Singapore Sports School

Senior career*
Years	Team	Apps	(Gls)
2021–	Young Lions	59	(6)
2026–	Hougang United	0	(0)

International career^{‡}
2019–2020	Singapore U16	7	(1)
2022–2023	Singapore U19	6	(1)
2023–	Singapore U23	2	(0)
2025–	Singapore	2	(0)
- * Club domestic league appearances and goals as of 01:31, 23 February 2025 (UTC+8) ‡ National team caps and goals as of 10 June 2025

Amir Syafiz bin Abdul Rashid (born 21 June 2004), better known as Amir Syafiz,is a Singaporean professional footballer who plays either as a striker or attacking-midfielder for Singapore Premier League club Hougang United and the Singapore national team.

== Club career ==
=== Young Lions ===
Amir made his Singapore Premier League debut for Young Lions in a league match against Balestier Khalsa on 14 March 2021 at the age of 16.

Amir went on to have a breakout season during the 2024–25 season where he went on to score 7 goals in 30 appearance in that season. He scored his first professional career goal in a 3–2 win against Tanjong Pagar United on 22 June 2024. Amir was then put on a 'man of the match' display where he scored a brace and assisted Danish Qayyum where the game ended in a 3–3 draw to Hougang United on 22 February 2025.

== International career ==
Amir was first called up to the Singapore national team in 2025, for the friendly against Maldives on 5 June 2025 and the 2027 AFC Asian Cup qualifiers against Bangladesh on 10 June 2025. Amir made his debut and started against Maldives on 5 June 2025 where the match ended in a 3–1 win to Singapore.

In September 2025, Amir was named captain of the Singapore U23 team for the 2026 AFC U-23 Asian Cup qualification fixture against Yemen, Vietnam, and Bangladesh.

== Career statistics ==
=== Club ===
As of 23 Feb 2025.

Club	Season	League			Cup		Other		Total	
Club	Season	Division	Apps	Goals	Apps	Goals	Apps	Goals	Apps	Goals
Young Lions	2021	Singapore Premier League	13	0	0	0	0	0	13	0
Young Lions	2022	Singapore Premier League	13	0	2	0	0	0	15	0
Young Lions	2023	Singapore Premier League	7	0	2	0	0	0	9	0
Young Lions	2024–25	Singapore Premier League	27	6	4	1	0	0	31	7
Young Lions	2025–26	Singapore Premier League	0	0	0	0	0	0	0	0
Young Lions	Total		59	6	8	1	0	0	67	7
Career total			59	6	8	1	0	0	67	7
