= Raoul Suhaimi =

Singaporean professional footballer (born 2005)

Personal information
- Full name: Raoul bin Suhaimi
- Date of birth: 18 September 2005 (age 21)
- Place of birth: Singapore
- Height: 1.82 m (6 ft 0 in)
- Position: Right-back

Team information
- Current team: Tampines Rovers
- Number: 2

Youth career
- –2020: Singapore Sports School

Senior career*
Years	Team	Apps	(Gls)
2021–2025	Young Lions	55	(0)
2025–	Tampines Rovers	21	(0)

International career^{‡}
2019–2021	Singapore U16	3	(0)
2022–2023	Singapore U19	7	(0)
2023–	Singapore U23	6	(0)
2026–	Singapore	1	(0)
- * Club domestic league appearances and goals as of 15:04, 16 May 2021 (UTC) ‡ National team caps and goals as of 17:37, 25 September 2026 (UTC)

Raoul bin Suhaimi (born 18 September 2005), better known as Raoul, is a Singaporean professional footballer who plays as a right-back for Singapore Premier League club Tampines Rovers and the Singapore national team. He is known for his long throw-ins and assists.

== Club career ==
=== Young Lions ===
On 15 May 2021, Raoul made his debut as the youngest player to play in the Singapore Premier League at 15 years and 239 days in a 2–1 defeat to Albirex Niigata (S).

On 7 August 2022, Raoul recorded a brace of assist in a 4–2 win over Tanjong Pagar United.

== International career ==
=== Youth ===
Raoul was part of the Singapore U19 squad for the 2022 and 2024 ASEAN U-19 Boys Championship where he was the captain in the latter tournament. In September 2024, Raoul was part of the Singapore U20 squad for the 2025 AFC U-20 Asian Cup qualification.

=== Senior ===
In December 2024, Raoul was called up by Singapore national team head coach, Tsutomu Ogura for the 2024 ASEAN Championship. He made his debut for Singapore in the 2026 FIFA ASEAN Cup against Indonesia on 25 September 2026.

== Career statistics ==
=== Club ===
As of 23 July 2024.

Club	Season	League			National Cup		League Cup		Continental		Total	
Club	Season	Division	Apps	Goals	Apps	Goals	Apps	Goals	Apps	Goals	Apps	Goals
Young Lions	2021	Singapore Premier League	6	0	0	0	0	0	0	0	6	0
Young Lions	2022	Singapore Premier League	14	0	1	0	0	0	0	0	15	0
Young Lions	2023	Singapore Premier League	9	0	0	0	0	0	0	0	9	0
Young Lions	2024–25	Singapore Premier League	17	0	4	0	0	0	0	0	21	0
Young Lions	2025–26	Singapore Premier League	5	0	0	0	0	0	0	0	5	0
Young Lions	Total		50	0	5	0	0	0	0	0	55	0
Tampines Rovers	2025–26	Singapore Premier League	14	0	1	0	1	0	3 (Note: 2 in AFC Elite 2, 1 in Shopee Cup)	0	18	0
Tampines Rovers	Total		14	0	1	0	0	0	3	0	18	0
Career total			58	0	6	0	0	0	3	0	67	0
