= Itsuki Enomoto =

Japanese footballer

Personal information
- Date of birth: 4 June 2000 (age 26)
- Place of birth: Saitama, Japan
- Height: 1.86 m (6 ft 1 in)
- Position: Forward

Team information
- Current team: Uthai Thani
- Number: 9

Youth career
- Higashimatsuyama Pelenia
- 2016–2018: Maebashi Ikuei High School

Senior career*
Years	Team	Apps	(Gls)
2019–2023	Matsumoto Yamaga	66	(8)
2019	→ Thespakusatsu Gunma (loan)	3	(0)
2024–2025	Young Lions	19	(13)
2025	Tampines Rovers	11	(6)
2025–2026	Chiangrai United	29	(11)
2026–	Uthai Thani	0	(0)
- * Club domestic league appearances and goals as of 15:34, 25 November 2023 (UTC)

Itsuki Enomoto (榎本 樹, Enomoto Itsuki; born 4 June 2000) is a Japanese footballer currently playing as a forward for Thai League 1 club Uthai Thani.

== Early life ==
Itsuki was born in Saitama. He played for Higashimatsuyama Pelenia and Maebashi Ikuei HS during his youth.

== Club career ==
=== Matsumoto Yamaga ===
In February 2019, Itsuki joined J1 League club Matsumoto Yamaga. After his loan spell ended with Thespakusatsu Gunma, he returned to the club which had recently been relegated to the J2 League. He make his debut for Matsumoto Yamaga on 25 July 2020 in a 1–0 lost to Omiya Ardija. Itsuki scored his first goal for the club on 19 September 2021 in a 1–1 draw to Zweigen Kanazawa. On 3 November, he scored a brace but it wasn't eventually enough as his team tumbled to a 3–2 defeat to Machida Zelvia. Itsuki make a total of 74 appearances for the club in all competition and scoring 9 goals in his 4 years at the club.

==== Thespakusatsu Gunma (loan) ====
On 31 January 2020, Itsuki joined Thespakusatsu Gunma on a season loan. He made his debut for the club against Gamba Osaka U23 on 24 November 2019.

=== Young Lions ===
In February 2024, Itsuki joined Singapore Premier League club Young Lions ahead of the 2024–25 season. He scored 13 goals in 19 appearances for the club.

=== Tampines Rovers ===
Mid-way in the January transfer window of the 2024–25 season, Itsuki joined another Singaporean club Tampines Rovers replacing their clinical striker Boris Kopitović who had just left the club. He went on to scored 9 goals in 18 appearances for the club racking up to 19 league goals 30 appearances for both Young Lions and Tampines Rovers in the 2024–25 league season.

=== Chiangrai United ===
On 5 July 2025, Itsuki joined Thai League 1 club Chiangrai United.

== Career statistics ==
=== Club ===
As of 10 May 2026.

Club	Season	League			National Cup		League Cup		Other		Total	
Club	Season	Division	Apps	Goals	Apps	Goals	Apps	Goals	Apps	Goals	Apps	Goals
Matsumoto Yamaga	2019	J1 League	0	0	0	0	4 (Note: Appearances in the J. League Cup)	0	0	0	4	0
Matsumoto Yamaga	2020	J2 League	3	0	0	0	1	0	0	0	4	0
Matsumoto Yamaga	2021	J2 League	13	3	2 (Note: Appearances in the Emperor's Cup)	0	0	0	0	0	15	3
Matsumoto Yamaga	2022	J3 League	28	4	1	1	0	0	0	0	29	5
Matsumoto Yamaga	2023	J3 League	22	1	0	0	0	0	0	0	22	1
Matsumoto Yamaga	Total		66	8	3	1	5	0	0	0	74	9
Thespakusatsu Gunma (loan)	2019	J3 League	3	0	0	0	–		0	0	3	0
Thespakusatsu Gunma (loan)	Total		3	0	0	0	0	0	0	0	3	0
Young Lions	2024–25	Singapore Premier League	19	13	0	0	0	0	0	0	19	13
Young Lions	Total		19	13	0	0	0	0	0	0	19	13
BG Tampines Rovers	2024–25	Singapore Premier League	11	6	7	3	0	0	0	0	18	9
BG Tampines Rovers	Total		11	6	7	3	0	0	0	0	18	9
Chiangrai United	2025–26	Thai League 1	29	11	3	1	0	0	0	0	32	12
Chiangrai United	Total		29	11	3	1	0	0	0	0	32	12
Career total			128	38	13	5	5	0	0	0	146	43
