= Andrew Aw =

Singaporean footballer

Andrew Aw Yong
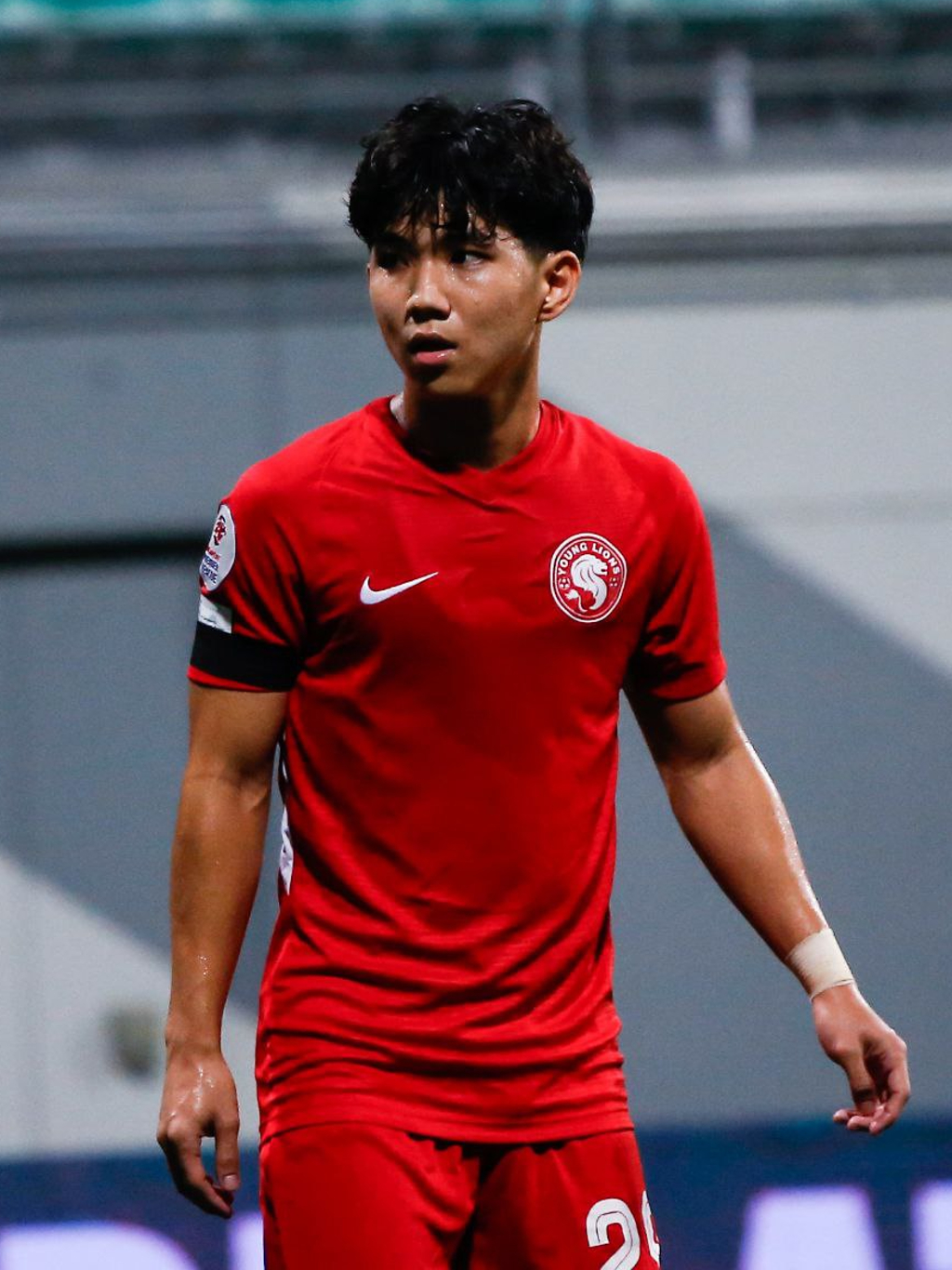
- Andrew playing for Young Lions in 2023.

Personal information
- Full name: Andrew Aw Yong Rei
- Date of birth: 29 March 2003 (age 23)
- Place of birth: Singapore
- Height: 1.68 m (5 ft 6 in)
- Position: Right back

Youth career
- –2019: Singapore Sports School

Senior career*
| Years | Team | Apps | (Gls) |
| 2020–2022 | Tampines Rovers | 29 | (0) |
| 2023–2026 | Young Lions | 17 | (1) |
| 2026- | FC Jurong | 0 | (0) |

International career^{‡}
| 2023– | Singapore U23 | 5 | (0) |
- * Club domestic league appearances and goals as of 12:07, 23 March 2023 (UTC+8) ‡ National team caps and goals as of 12:07, 23 March 2023 (UTC+8)

Andrew Aw Yong Rei (Chinese: 歐陽銳; born 29 March 2003) is a Singaporean professional footballer who plays as a right back for Singapore Premier League club FC Jurong. In addition to playing as a right back, Andrew can play right wingback and right midfield.

== Club career ==
Aw, while studying at Singapore Sports School, captained his school team. In 2018, he was one of the eight promising youngsters from the FAS Football Academy who was shortlisted for the TNP Dollah Kassim Award. He also went for a training stint with Japan J2 League club, Omiya Ardija.

=== Tampines Rovers ===
Andrew was promoted to the Tampines Rovers senior squad ahead of the 2020 Singapore Premier League season and wore the jersey number 45. He made his first start for the club in a 3–1 victory over Young Lions before being subbed off in the half-time break.

He would continue his journey with the rovers for the 2021 season with a contract extension. Andrew was included in the squad for their 2021 AFC Cup campaign too and said that it was eye-opening to be watching the Korean opponents have their professional diets and regime, realizing how professionalism is quite lacking in Singapore as most players didn't care about their diets.

Andrew got his second extension for the 2022 season following a good showing in the 2021 season. Andrew would provide an assist to Boris Kopitovic in their AFC Cup campaign against Kuala Lumpur City to secure his first continental assist.

=== Young Lions ===
Andrew would join the Young Lions on loan ahead of the 2023 Singapore Premier League season, wearing the jersey number 29. He would make his debut for the club in the season opener against Albirex Niigata (S), however coming out with a 3–0 defeat. However Andrew suffered an injury setback in a 3–1 lost to Balestier Khalsa where he tore his Anterior Talo-Fibular Ligament in a challenge. He made his return from injury two weeks later. Andrew soon departed the club to serve national service.

Andrew returned to the developmental side in March 2024 ahead of the 2024–25 season. On 15 June 2024, as Young Lions was on par with Albirex Niigata (S) on a 2–2 tie, he scored the winning goal in the 87th minute which give his team the 3 points and also Young Lions first ever win against Albirex since the 2015 S.League season.

=== FC Jurong ===
Andrew signed with FC Jurong of the Singapore Premier League 2026-27 season.

== International career ==
In 2023, Aw was selected in the U22 Singapore team for the 2023 Merlion Cup. Andrew would make his debut for the team in a 1–0 lost to Hong Kong in the Merlion Cup semifinals.

Andrew was then selected in the preliminary 25-man squad ahead of the 2023 SEA Games.

== Personal life ==
Andrew studied in Singapore Sports School and attended Republic Polytechnic as his post-secondary education.

== Career statistics ==
=== Club ===
As of 16 June 2024

| Club | Season | League | | | FA Cup | | Asia | | Total | |
| Club | Season | Division | Apps | Goals | Apps | Goals | Apps | Goals | Apps | Goals |
|---|---|---|---|---|---|---|---|---|---|---|
| Tampines Rovers | 2020 | Singapore Premier League | 4 | 0 | 0 | 0 | 0 | 0 | 4 | 0 |
| Tampines Rovers | 2021 | Singapore Premier League | 6 | 0 | 0 | 0 | 1 | 0 | 7 | 0 |
| Tampines Rovers | 2022 | Singapore Premier League | 16 | 0 | 1 | 0 | 1 | 0 | 18 | 0 |
| Tampines Rovers | Total | | 26 | 0 | 1 | 0 | 1 | 0 | 29 | 0 |
| Young Lions | 2023 | Singapore Premier League | 13 | 0 | 0 | 0 | 0 | 0 | 13 | 0 |
| Young Lions | 2024–25 | Singapore Premier League | 27 | 1 | 4 | 0 | 0 | 0 | 31 | 1 |
| Young Lions | 2025–26 | Singapore Premier League | 0 | 0 | 0 | 0 | 0 | 0 | 0 | 0 |
| Young Lions | Total | | 40 | 1 | 4 | 0 | 0 | 0 | 44 | 1 |
| Career total | | | 66 | 1 | 5 | 0 | 1 | 0 | 71 | 1 |

=== International ===
==== Singapore Under-23's ====
As of match played 13 September 2023

| No | Date | Venue | Opponent | Result | Competition |
|---|---|---|---|---|---|
| 1 | 24 March 2023 | Jalan Besar Stadium, Jalan Besar, Singapore | Hong Kong | 0–1 (lost) | Merlion Cup |
| 2 | 26 March 2023 | Jalan Besar Stadium, Jalan Besar, Singapore | Cambodia | 1–2 (lost) | Merlion Cup |
| 3 | 29 April 2023 | Prince Stadium, Phnom Penh, Cambodia | Thailand | 1–3 (lost) | 2023 SEA Games |
| 4 | 6 May 2023 | Prince Stadium, Phnom Penh, Cambodia | Laos | 0-0 (draw) | 2023 SEA Games |
| 5 | 11 May 2023 | Prince Stadium, Phnom Penh, Cambodia | Malaysia | 0-7 (lost) | 2023 SEA Games |
