= Aqil Yazid =

Singaporean professional footballer

Personal information
- Full name: Muhammad Aqil bin Mohammad Yazid
- Date of birth: 9 January 2004 (age 22)
- Place of birth: Singapore
- Height: 1.75 m (5 ft 9 in)
- Positions: Centre-back; right-back

Team information
- Current team: Young Lions
- Number: 19

Youth career
- –2020: Singapore Sports School

Senior career*
Years	Team	Apps	(Gls)
2021–2025	Balestier Khalsa	8	(0)
2023–	→ Young Lions (loan)	15	(1)

International career
2019	Singapore U16	5	(0)
2022	Singapore U19	5	(0)
2023–	Singapore U23	6	(0)
- * Club domestic league appearances and goals as of 15:04, 24 May 2021 (UTC)

Muhammad Aqil bin Mohamed Yazid (born 9 January 2004), commonly known as Aqil Yazid or mononymously known as Aqil, is a Singaporean professional footballer who plays either as a centre-back or right-back for Singapore Premier League club Young Lions, on loan from Hougang United, and the Singapore U23 national team.

He is the older brother of Aizil Yazid, who is also a professional footballer, playing as a goalkeeper for Singapore Premier League club Young Lions, and the son of former international Yazid Yasin.

== Club ==
=== Balestier Khalsa ===
Aqil signed for Singapore Premier League club Balestier Khalsa FC and made his debut against the Young Lions FC in a 3-3 draw in the 2021 campaign. He would than go on to make another 7 appearances for the Tigers.

== Career statistics ==
=== Club ===
As of 10 Oct 2021.

Club	Season	League			Cup		Other		Total	
Club	Season	Division	Apps	Goals	Apps	Goals	Apps	Goals	Apps	Goals
Balestier Khalsa	2021	Singapore Premier League	6	0	0	0	0	0	6	0
Balestier Khalsa	2022	Singapore Premier League	2	0	0	0	0	0	2	0
Balestier Khalsa	Total		8	0	0	0	0	0	8	0
Young Lions FC	2023	Singapore Premier League	9	1	0	0	0	0	9	1
Young Lions FC	Total		9	1	0	0	0	0	9	1
Career total			17	1	0	0	0	0	17	1
