= Danial Scott Crichton =

Singaporean footballer

Danial Crichton
Personal information
- Full name: Danial Scott Crichton
- Date of birth: 11 April 2003 (age 23)
- Place of birth: Singapore
- Position: Defender

Team information
- Current team: Balestier Khalsa
- Number: 5

Youth career
- Euro Soccer Academy U15
- Rising Stars (Korea) U13 - U17
- 2019: Anza U15
- 2019: Warriors

Senior career*
Years	Team	Apps	(Gls)
2020–2025	Young Lions	22	(0)
2025–26	Geylang International	0	(0)
2026–	Balestier Khalsa	1	(0)

International career
2017–2018	Singapore U15		
2019–2021	Singapore U18		
2019–2022	Singapore U19	10	(0)
- * Club domestic league appearances and goals as of 21 November 2026

Danial Scott Crichton (born 11 April 2003) is a Singaporean footballer who currently plays as a defender for Singapore Premier League club Balestier Khalsa FC. He previously played for NCAA Division I club UTRGV.

== Career statistics ==
=== Club ===
As of 21 November 2026.

Club	Season	League			FA Cup		Other		Total	
Club	Season	Division	Apps	Goals	Apps	Goals	Apps	Goals	Apps	Goals
Young Lions	2020	Singapore Premier League	5	0	0	0	0	0	5	0
Young Lions	2021	Singapore Premier League	0	0	0	0	0	0	0	0
Young Lions	2022	Singapore Premier League	9	0	3	0	0	0	12	0
Young Lions	2023	Singapore Premier League	3	0	0	0	0	0	3	0
Young Lions	2024-25	Singapore Premier League	5	0	1	0	0	0	6	0
Young Lions	Total		22	0	4	0	0	0	26	0
Geylang International	2025-26	Singapore Premier League	0	0	1	0	0	0	1	0
Balestier Khalsa	2026-27	Singapore Premier League	1	0	0	0	0	0	1	0
Career total			23	0	5	0	0	0	28	0
