= Iman Hakim =

Singaporean footballer

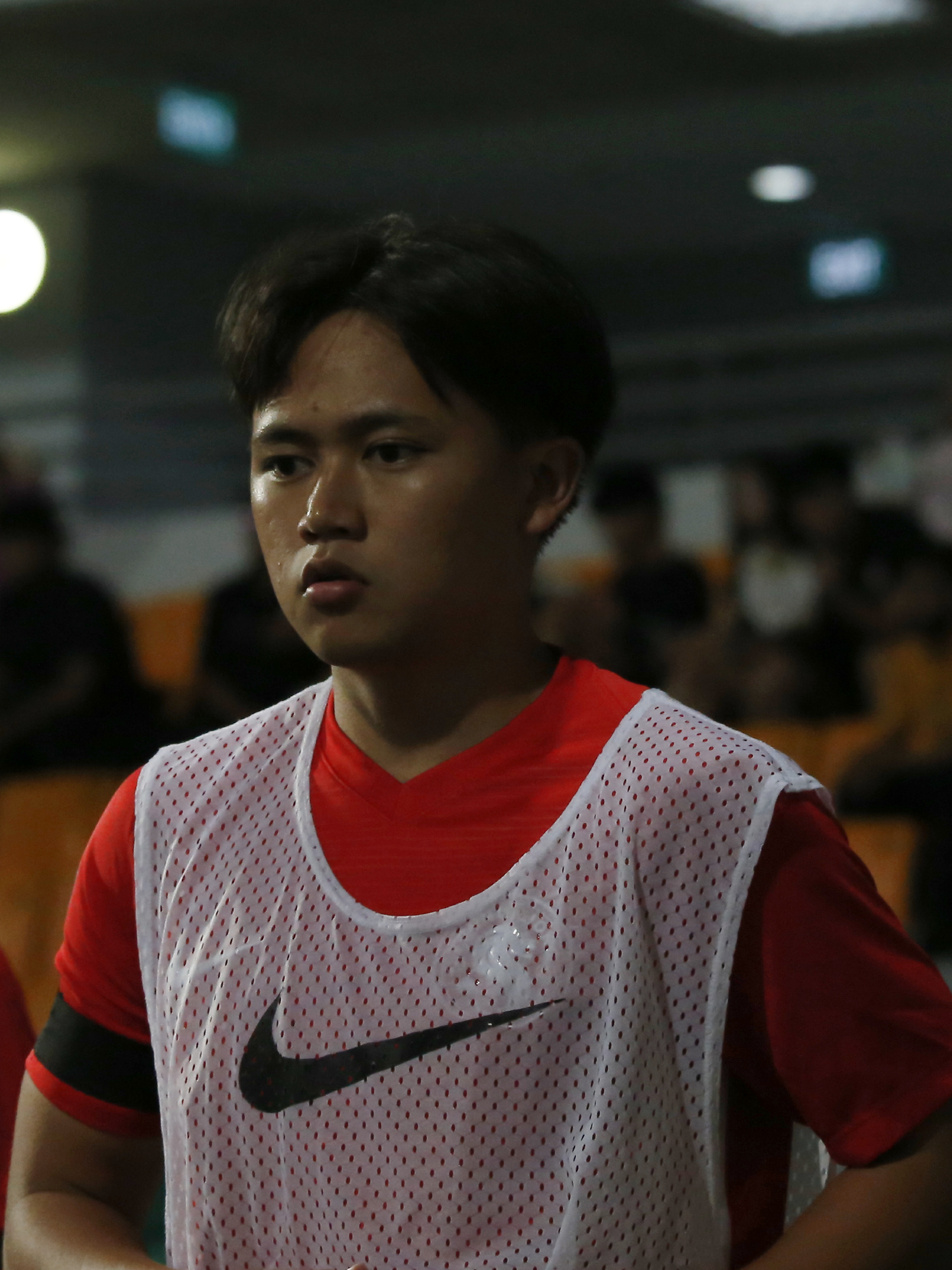
- Iman Hakim playing for Young Lions in 2023

Personal information
- Full name: Iman Hakim Ibrahim
- Date of birth: 9 March 2002 (age 24)
- Place of birth: Singapore
- Height: 1.66 m (5 ft 5 in)
- Position: Midfielder

Team information
- Current team: Young Lions on loan from Tampines Rovers
- Number: 21

Youth career
- –2019: Singapore Sports School

Senior career*
Years	Team	Apps	(Gls)
2020	Albirex Niigata Singapore	9	(0)
2021–	Tampines Rovers	12	(0)
2023–	→ Young Lions (loan)	8	(0)

International career^{‡}
2017–2018	Singapore U16	9	(0)
2019	Singapore U19	4	(0)
2023–	Singapore U23	2	(0)
- * Club domestic league appearances and goals as of 15:04, 7 Jan 2021 (UTC) ‡ National team caps and goals as of 15:04, 2 March 2020 (UTC)

Iman Hakim Ibrahim (born 9 March 2002), more commonly known as Iman Hakim or mononymously as Iman, is a Singaporean professional footballer who currently plays mainly as a central-midfielder for Singapore Premier League club Young Lions, on loan from Tampines Rovers. He was named in Goal Singapore's NxGn 2020 list as one of the country's most promising talents, having previously won the Dollah Kassim Award in 2019. The midfielder draws inspiration from former Barcelona stars Ronaldinho, Xavi and Andres Iniesta.

== Career statistics ==
=== Club ===
As of 10 Oct 2021.

== Honours ==
=== Individual ===
- Dollah Kassim Award recipients : 2019

Club	Season	League			FA Cup		League Cup		AFC/ACL		Total	
Club	Season	Division	Apps	Goals	Apps	Goals	Apps	Goals	Apps	Goals	Apps	Goals
Albirex Niigata Singapore	2020	Singapore Premier League	9	0	0	0	0	0	0	0	9	0
Tampines Rovers	2021	Singapore Premier League	12	0	0	0	0	0	3	0	15	0
Tampines Rovers	2022	Singapore Premier League	0	0	0	0	0	0	0	0	0	0
Tampines Rovers	Total		12	0	0	0	0	0	3	0	15	0
Career total			21	0	0	0	0	0	3	0	24	0

== Honours ==
=== Club ===
==== Albirex Niigata (S) ====
- Singapore Premier League: 2020
