= Kieran Teo =

Singaporean footballer (born 2004)

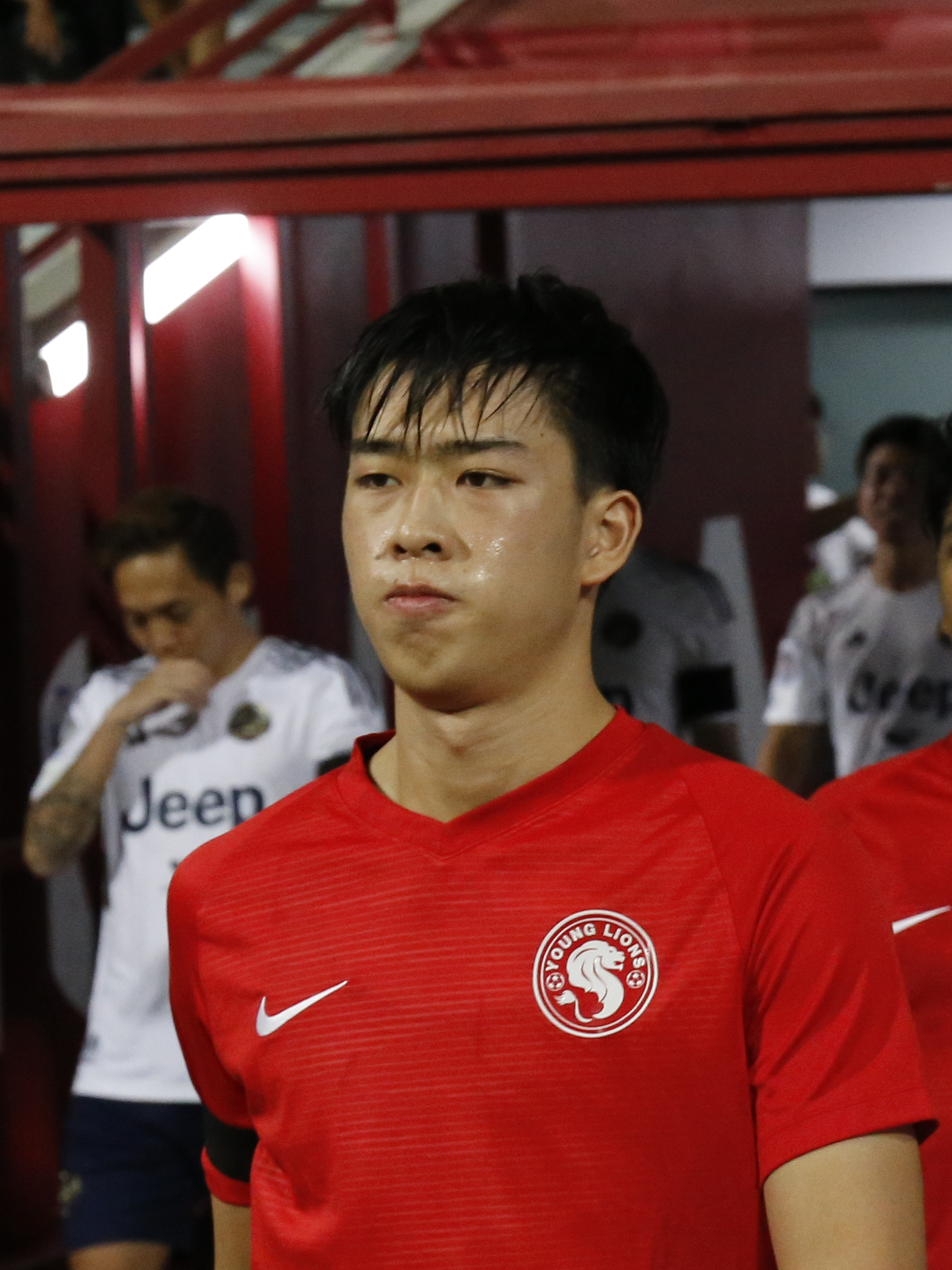
- Kieran Teo with [[Tanjong Pagar United]]

Personal information
- Full name: Kieran Teo Jia Jun
- Date of birth: 6 April 2004 (age 22)
- Place of birth: Singapore
- Height: 1.82 m (6 ft 0 in)
- Position: Centre-back

Team information
- Current team: Tanjong Pagar United
- Number: 21

Youth career
- –2020: Home United

Senior career*
Years	Team	Apps	(Gls)
2022–2025	Geylang International	2	(0)
2023–2026	→ Young Lions	18	(1)
2026-	Tanjong Pagar United		

International career^{‡}
2019	Singapore U16	5	(0)
2022	Singapore U19	7	(1)
2023–	Singapore U23	7	(0)
- * Club domestic league appearances and goals as of 15:04, 25 Apr 23 (UTC) ‡ National team caps and goals as of 15:04, 25 Apr 23 (UTC)

Kieran Teo Jia Jun (born 6 April 2004), better known as Kieran Teo, is a Singaporean professional footballer who plays primarily as a centre-back for Singapore Premier League club Tanjong Pagar United and the Singapore national team. Kieran also plays for the Singapore U23 National Team.

== Club ==
=== Geylang International ===
A member of the Geylang International youth setup, Kieran made his professional debut in a 1–0 loss to Balestier Khalsa. Following his debut, Kieran expressed his interest in continuing to impress and fighting for a spot in the team during the season. He made his first start in a 4–1 loss to the Young Lions away from home.

=== Young Lions ===
Kieran was loaned to Young Lions ahead of the 2023 Singapore Premier League season.

Teo then made his debut in a 2–1 victory over Hougang United. He then scored his first professional goal in a late fashion during a thrilling 2–2 draw to DPMM. He would then score in the Singapore cup during a 4–2 victory over his former club Geylang International.

== International career ==
In 2022, he was named in the U-19 Singapore squad ahead of the 2022 AFF U-19 Youth Championship.

Teo then scored his first international goal against Cambodia's Under-19s in the 2023 AFC U-20 Asian Cup qualification.

Kieran was then called up for the 2023 Merlion Cup following a good showing with the Young Lions in the Singapore Premier League. He made his international Under-23's debut in a 1–0 loss to Hong Kong. He made his second appearance in a 2–1 loss to Cambodia in the third place playoff.

Kieran got into the 25-man preliminary squad ahead of the 2023 SEA Games. He would then be called up to the senior Singapore squad in the away fixture versus China in replacement of Lionel Tan.

== Career statistics ==
=== Club ===
As of 27 Aug 2022.

Club	Season	League			Cup		Other		Total	
Club	Season	Division	Apps	Goals	Apps	Goals	Apps	Goals	Apps	Goals
Geylang International	2022	Singapore Premier League	3	0	1	0	0	0	4	0
Geylang International	Total		3	0	1	0	0	0	4	0
Young Lions FC	2023	Singapore Premier League	18	1	4	1	0	0	22	2
Young Lions FC	2024–25	Singapore Premier League	0	0	0	0	0	0	0	0
Young Lions FC	Total		18	1	4	1	0	0	22	2
Career total			21	1	4	1	0	0	26	2
