= Ilhan Noor =

Singaporean footballer

Personal information
- Full name: Mohamed Ilhan bin Mohamed Noor
- Date of birth: 19 December 2002 (age 23)
- Place of birth: Singapore
- Height: 1.83 m (6 ft 0 in)
- Positions: Full-back; winger

Team information
- Current team: Police SA (on loan from Geylang International)

Youth career
- 2018–2020: Geylang International

Senior career*
Years	Team	Apps	(Gls)
2021–	Geylang International	31	(3)
2023	→ Young Lions (loan)	14	(0)
2024	→ Police SA (loan)	0	(0)

International career
2023–	Singapore U23	6	(0)
- * Club domestic league appearances and goals as of 15:04, 24 May 2021 (UTC)

Mohamed Ilhan bin Mohamed Noor (born 19 December 2002) also known as Ilhan Noor, is a Singaporean professional footballer who plays as a full-back or winger for Singapore Premier League club Young Lions, on loan from Geylang International.

He is the son of current Geylang International coach, Mohd Noor Ali.

== Club career ==
=== Geylang International ===
Ilhan started his career at Geylang International playing for the youth side before getting promoted to the under-21 side in 2019. In 2021, Ilhan was promoted to the senior side where he make his 2021 Singapore Premier League debut against Lion City Sailors on 9 May 2021. Ilhan then scored a brace against Tanjong Pagar United on 1 August 2021 helping his team to a 3–1 win.

==== Loan to Young Lions ====
On 24 January 2023, Ilhan moved to Young Lions on loan while serving his compulsory two years National Service. On 25 February 2023, he make his debut for the club in a 3–0 lost against Albirex Niigata (S).

== International career ==
=== Youth ===
In 2023, Ilhan was called up to the 2023 Merlion Cup, 2023 Southeast Asia Games and the 2024 AFC U-23 Asian Cup qualification.

== Career statistics ==
=== Club ===
As of 9 Oct 2022.

Club	Season	League			Cup		Other		Total	
Club	Season	Division	Apps	Goals	Apps	Goals	Apps	Goals	Apps	Goals
Geylang International	2021	Singapore Premier League	10	2	0	0	0	0	10	2
Geylang International	2022	Singapore Premier League	21	1	3	0	0	0	24	1
Geylang International	Total		31	3	0	0	0	0	34	3
Young Lions	2023	Singapore Premier League	14	0	1	0	0	0	15	0
Young Lions	Total		14	0	1	0	0	0	15	0
Police SA	2024	Singapore Football League	?	4	0	0	0	0	?	4
Police SA	Total		?	4	0	0	0	0	?	4
Career total			29	2	0	0	0	0	34	3

== International statistics ==
=== U23 International caps ===
No	Date	Venue	Opponent	Result	Competition
1	26 March 2023	Jalan Besar Stadium, Jalan Besar, Singapore	Cambodia	1–2 (lost)	Merlion Cup
2	29 April 2023	Prince Stadium, Phnom Penh, Cambodia	Thailand	1–3 (lost)	2023 SEA Games
3	3 May 2023	Prince Stadium, Phnom Penh, Cambodia	Vietnam	1–3 (lost)	2023 SEA Games
4	11 May 2023	Prince Stadium, Phnom Penh, Cambodia	Malaysia	0–7 (lost)	2023 SEA Games
5	6 Sept 2023	Việt Trì Stadium, Phú Thọ, Vietnam	Yemen	0–3 (lost)	2024 AFC U-23 Asian Cup qualification
6	9 Sept 2023	Việt Trì Stadium, Phú Thọ, Vietnam	Guam	1–1 (draw)	2024 AFC U-23 Asian Cup qualification
