= Khairin Nadim =

Singaporean footballer

Personal information
- Full name: Khairin Nadim bin Rahim
- Date of birth: 8 May 2004 (age 22)
- Place of birth: Singapore
- Height: 1.71 m (5 ft 7 in)
- Positions: Right winger; forward

Team information
- Current team: Hougang United (on loan from Lion City Sailors)

Senior career*
| Years | Team | Apps | (Gls) |
| 2020–2023 | Young Lions | 49 | (7) |
| 2023–2025 | Lion City Sailors | 0 | (0) |
| 2023–2024 | → Young Lions (loan) | 16 | (1) |
| 2025–2026 | Vizela | 0 | (0) |
| 2026– | Lion City Sailors | 0 | (0) |
| 2026– | → Hougang United (loan) | 0 | (0) |

International career^{‡}
| 2019–2021 | Singapore U16 | 2 | (2) |
| 2022–2023 | Singapore U19 | 4 | (1) |
| 2021– | Singapore U23 | 6 | (0) |
- * Club domestic league appearances and goals as of 18 October 2024 ‡ National team caps and goals as of 7 May 2022

Khairin Nadim bin Rahim (born 8 May 2004) is a Singaporean professional footballer who plays as a right winger for Singapore Premier League club Hougang United on loan from Lion City Sailors. He was part of Goal Singapore's NxGn 2020 list as one of the country's biggest talents.

At 16 years and 194 days, Khairin became the youngest Singapore Premier League goalscorer of all time with his opening goal against Tampines Rovers on 17 November 2020 where he also become the youngest player ever to score five goals in the history of the league at 16 years old. At 15 years and 298 days, Khairin Nadim is the third youngest Singapore Premier League debutant ever.

== Club career ==
=== Young Lions ===
Khairin signed for Young Lions in 2020. He made his professional debut on 1 March 2020 in a 1–4 lost against Hougang United when he was substituted in the 75th minute. At 15 years and 298 days old, he became the youngest ever debutant in Singapore Premier League history before the record was broken on 31 March 2023 by Lion City Sailors player Nathan Mao at 15 years and 5 days old.

Khairin then became the second-youngest player to score in Singapore's professional football league in the Young Lions' 3–1 lost to Tampines in the same year, missing Singapore captain Hariss Harun’s record by just 20 days. Khairin continued his fine progress and broke yet another record when he scored against Geylang International on 20 March 2021. At just 16 years and 316 days old, Khairin became the youngest player ever to score five goals in Singapore Premier League eclipsing the previous record of 17 years and 102 days set by Geylang’s Zikos Chua in 2019. His performance at the start of the 2021 Singapore Premier League earned him the SPL 'Young Player of the Month' award in March 2021.

=== Lion City Sailors ===
In early January 2023, Khairin was signed by Lion City Sailors where he was part of the club under-21 and academy squad.

==== Loan to Young Lions ====
Midway through the year, he enlisted into the Singapore Armed Forces for his compulsory national service. Thus, he rejoined his former club Young Lions on loan in April 2024.

=== Vizela ===
On 5 February 2025, Khairin signed for Liga Portugal 2 club Vizela on a one-and-a-half year deal. He will feature primarily for Vizela's U23 squad that competes in the Liga Revelação.

== International career ==
=== Youth ===
Khairin represent Singapore U16 at the 2020 AFC U-16 Championship qualification in 2019.

== Personal life ==
Khairin is a childhood Liverpool fan and cited Brazilian star, Neymar as his footballing idol growing up.

== Career statistics ==
=== Club ===
As of match played 14 June 2025

Appearances and goals by club, season and competition
| Club | Season | League | | | National cup | | League cup | | Continental | | Other | | Total | |
| Club | Season | Division | Apps | Goals | Apps | Goals | Apps | Goals | Apps | Goals | Apps | Goals | Apps | Goals |
|---|---|---|---|---|---|---|---|---|---|---|---|---|---|---|
| Young Lions | 2020 | Singapore Premier League | 12 | 3 | 0 | 0 | 0 | 0 | — | | — | | 12 | 3 |
| Young Lions | 2021 | Singapore Premier League | 19 | 3 | 0 | 0 | 0 | 0 | — | | — | | 19 | 3 |
| Young Lions | 2022 | Singapore Premier League | 18 | 1 | 1 | 0 | 0 | 0 | — | | — | | 19 | 1 |
| Young Lions | Total | | 49 | 7 | 1 | 0 | 0 | 0 | 0 | 0 | 0 | 0 | 50 | 7 |
| Lion City Sailors | 2023 | Singapore Premier League | 0 | 0 | 0 | 0 | 0 | 0 | — | | — | | 0 | 0 |
| Young Lions (loan) | 2024–25 | Singapore Premier League | 16 | 1 | 0 | 0 | 0 | 0 | — | | — | | 16 | 1 |
| Vizela | 2024–25 | Liga Portugal 2 | 0 | 0 | 0 | 0 | 0 | 0 | — | | — | | 0 | 0 |
| Vizela | 2025–26 | Liga Portugal 2 | 0 | 0 | 0 | 0 | 0 | 0 | — | | — | | 0 | 0 |
| Vizela | Total | | 0 | 0 | 0 | 0 | 0 | 0 | 0 | 0 | 0 | 0 | 0 | 0 |
| Career total | | | 65 | 8 | 1 | 0 | 0 | 0 | 0 | 0 | 0 | 0 | 66 | 8 |

- Young Lions are ineligible for qualification to AFC competitions in their respective leagues.
