= Visakha Stadium =

Stadium in Phnom Penh, Cambodia

- Prince Stadium
- Interactive map of Visakha Stadium
- Location: Phnom Penh, Cambodia
- Coordinates: 11°37′34″N 104°52′26″E
- Capacity: 15,000

Tenant
- Visakha (2016–present)

Visakha Stadium, also known as Prince Stadium, is a multi-use stadium in Phnom Penh, Cambodia. It is currently used mostly for association football. The stadium holds 15,000 people. It is the home stadium of Cambodian Premier League team Visakha. The 2023 Southeast Asian Games was held here.

== Location ==
This stadium is located in Phnom Penh, Cambodia.

== See also ==
- RCAF Old Stadium
- RSN Stadium
