= Farhan Zulkifli =

Singaporean footballer

Personal information
- Full name: Muhammad Farhan bin Zulkifli
- Date of birth: 10 November 2002 (age 24)
- Place of birth: Singapore
- Height: 1.62 m (5 ft 4 in)
- Positions: Winger; full-back

Team information
- Current team: Lion City Sailors
- Number: 19

Youth career
- 2017: NFA U15
- 2018: Home United U16
- 2019: Hougang United U19

Senior career*
Years	Team	Apps	(Gls)
2019–2026	Hougang United	92	(11)
2023–2024	→ Young Lions (loan)	25	(4)
2026–	Lion City Sailors	3	(0)

International career^{‡}
2017–2018	Singapore U16	2	(1)
2019–	Singapore U19	2	(0)
2019–2021	Singapore U23	6	(1)
2019–	Singapore	20	(1)
- * Club domestic league appearances and goals as of 1 November 2026 ‡ National team caps and goals as of 1 October 2026

Muhammad Farhan bin Zulkifli (born 10 November 2002), better known as Farhan Zulkifli or just Farhan, is a Singaporean professional footballer who plays either as a winger or full-back for Singapore Premier League club Lion City Sailors and the Singapore national team. Considered as one of the brightest talents in the country, he is known for his pace, dribbling and playmaking abilities.

== Club career ==
=== Hougang United ===
Farhan make his career debut coming on as a substitute and scored 12 minutes into his 2019 Singapore Premier League debut against Home United on 29 June 2019, where at 16 years and 231 days, he became the Singapore Premier League's second-youngest ever scorer then in a 2–0 win. Farhan was named in Goal Singapore's NxGn 2020 list as one of the country's biggest talents following his impressive start to life at Hougang. He made a further 11 appearances for Hougang in the 2019 season.

Farhan would start both the 2020 Singapore Premier League season opener and the 2020 Singapore Community Shield. However, the 2020 Singapore Premier League season hasn't been the best of years for Farhan, by his own admission. Farhan played in 12 matches and only had a solitary goal to his name.

Farhan would go on to play a total of 1767 minutes in the 2021 season bagging 20 appearances however, he failed to score a goal once during the 2021 Singapore Premier League season.

2022 for Farhan could be called his breakout year as he managed to make 18 appearances for the team and scoring 1 goal during the 5–1 thrashing of Young Lions. Farhan also played a crucial role in Hougang United's triumph over Tampines Rovers in the 2022 Singapore Cup Finals, helping his team stun Tampines Rovers 3–2 to clinch the cup.

==== Young Lions (loan) ====
On 12 July 2023, Farhan joined Young Lions on loan from Hougang United as he is undergoing his compulsory National Service. He was named the club vice-captain ahead of the 2024–25 Singapore Premier League season.

In November 2024, Farhan completed his National Service and returned to Hougang United.

=== Lion City Sailors ===
On 1 July 2026, Farhan joined Lion City Sailors on a two-year contract.

== International career ==
=== Youth ===
Farhan has represented Singapore Singapore U16, Singapore U19 and Singapore U23 respectively. In October 2021, he was called up to the Singapore U23 squad for the 2022 AFC U-23 Asian Cup qualification fixtures.

=== Senior ===
Farhan was first called up to the Singapore national team in 2019, for the friendly against Jordan on 5 October and the 2022 FIFA World Cup qualifiers against Saudi Arabia and Uzbekistan on 10 and 15 October respectively.

In 2022, Farhan was called up to the national team for the 2022 AFF Championship tournament. He make his international debut against causeway rival, Malaysia.

On 14 November 2024, Farhan scored his first goal for Singapore during a friendly match against Myanmar where he opened up the account in the 5th minute.

== Career statistics ==
=== Club ===
As of 10 October 2021.

Club	Season	League			Cup		Continental		Other		Total	
Club	Season	Division	Apps	Goals	Apps	Goals	Apps	Goals	Apps	Goals	Apps	Goals
Hougang United	2019	Singapore Premier League	9	1	3	0	0	0	0	0	12	1
Hougang United	2020	Singapore Premier League	13	1	0	0	1	0	0	0	14	1
Hougang United	2021	Singapore Premier League	20	0	0	0	0	0	0	0	20	0
Hougang United	2022	Singapore Premier League	18	1	6	1	0	0	0	0	24	2
Hougang United	2024–25	Singapore Premier League	12	3	4	0	0	0	0	0	16	3
Hougang United	2025–26	Singapore Premier League	15	2	4	3	0	0	0	0	19	5
Hougang United	Total		87	7	17	3	1	0	0	0	105	8
Young Lions	2023	Singapore Premier League	7	0	3	1	0	0	0	0	10	1
Young Lions	2024–25	Singapore Premier League	11	3	0	0	0	0	0	0	11	3
Young Lions	Total		18	3	3	1	0	0	0	0	21	4
Career total			105	10	20	4	1	0	0	0	126	16

International goals

#	Date	Venue	Opponent	Score	Result	Competition
1.	14 November 2024	Singapore National Stadium, Singapore	Myanmar	1–0	3–2	Friendly

== Honours ==
=== Club ===
Hougang United

- Singapore Cup: 2022
