= Aizil Yazid =

Singaporean footballer

Personal information
- Full name: Muhammad Aizil Mohamed Yazid
- Date of birth: 24 December 2004 (age 21)
- Place of birth: Singapore
- Height: 1.77 m (5 ft 9 1/2 in)
- Position: Goalkeeper

Team information
- Current team: Young Lions (on loan from Hougang United)
- Number: 1

Youth career
- 2015–2016: ANZA Soccer
- 2016–17: Chelsea FC International
- 2018–19: Singapore Sports School

Senior career*
Years	Team	Apps	(Gls)
2020	Albirex Niigata (S)	0	(0)
2021–	Hougang United	6	(0)
2023–2026	→ Young Lions (loan)	26	(0)
2026-	Hougang United		

International career^{‡}
2019	Singapore U15	0	(0)
2022–	Singapore U19	3	(0)
2022–	Singapore U23	8	(0)
- * Club domestic league appearances and goals as of 07:54, 16 September 2022 (UTC) ‡ National team caps and goals as of 16 September 2022

Muhammad Aizil bin Mohamed Yazid (born 24 December 2004), more commonly known as Aizil Yazid, is a Singapore professional footballer who plays as a goalkeeper for Singapore Premier League club Young Lions, on loan from Hougang United and the Singapore U23 national team.

== Club career ==
=== Albirex Niigata (S) ===
Aizil signed for Albirex Niigata Singapore and was part of the 2020 Singapore Premier League squad that won the league title over rivals, Tampines Rovers.

=== Hougang United ===
On 15 January 2021,16-year-old Aizil signed for Hougang United prior to the 2021 season as part of the goalkeeping trio of Mukundan Maran and Ridhuan Barudin.

Aizil would go on to make his professional debut against the same side Tampines Rovers in a 4–2 win over The Stags making him the second-youngest goalkeeper debutant in the league's history at 17 years and 218 days old, just falling short of his father's record at 16 years and 309 days.

Aizil would then make four more consecutive appearances for The Cheetahs before being unavailable during Hougang's league match against Tanjong Pagar United.

=== Young Lions ===
Aizil signed on loan from Hougang due to his enlistment to national service ahead of the 2023 Singapore Premier League with the Young Lions.

He made his debut in a 3–0 defeat to Albirex Niigata.

=== Return to Hougang United ===
Aizil returned to Hougang United in March 2026, making his second debut for the club in a 4-0 defeat to Albirex Niigata.

== Career statistics ==
=== Club ===
As of 27 Aug 2022.

Club	Season	League			Cup		Other		Total	
Club	Season	Division	Apps	Goals	Apps	Goals	Apps	Goals	Apps	Goals
Hougang United	2022	Singapore Premier League	6	0	2	0	0	0	8	0
Hougang United	Total		6	0	2	0	0	0	8	0
Young Lions	2023	Singapore Premier League	20	0	0	0	0	0	20	0
Young Lions	2024–25	Singapore Premier League	20	0	1	0	0	0	21	0
Young Lions	2025–26	Singapore Premier League	0	0	0	0	0	0	0	0
Young Lions	Total		46	0	1	0	0	0	47	0
Hougang United	2025–26	Singapore Premier League	1	0	0	0	0	0	0	0
Hougang United	Total		1	0	0	0	0	0	0	0
Career total			53	0	1	0	0	0	47	0

== International career ==
Aizil was called up for the Singapore under-15 squad ahead of the 2019 AFF Championships.

In 2022, Aizil was called up to the provisional squad for the Singapore under-23 team ahead of the under-23 AFF Championships held in Cambodia but ultimately didn't make the cut. Aizil was then called up to the Singapore under-19 team for the under-19 AFF Championships held in Indonesia after Hougang's AFC Cup campaign but didn't travel with the squad as he appeared on the bench against Young Lions a few days after the tournament's opening. Aizil was called up for the team again for the AFC U-20 Asian Cup qualifiers and made his debut against group hosts Tajikistan, producing a man of the match performance as he kept a clean sheet including a penalty save to give The Cubs a hard-fought draw.

Aizil was called up for the 2023 Merlion Cup campaign where he made his Under-23's debut in a 1–0 loss to Hong Kong, along with a loss, Aizil would be awarded a red card for his behaviour against the referee near the end of the match. Following his good showing in his league campaign, he was then called up for the 2023 SEA Games 25-men provisional squad. He then made the final cut for the squad and made his first SEA Games appearance in a 3–1 defeat to Thailand in the group opener. Aizil was also given the starting position in the 7-0 thrashing from Malaysia, leading to the intense criticism despite his stellar performances in goal.

== Personal life ==
Aizil is the son of Singapore goalkeeping legend, Yazid Yasin and the younger brother of Young Lions centre-back, Aqil Yazid.

== Honours ==
=== Club ===
==== Albirex Niigata (S) ====
- Singapore Premier League: 2020

==== Hougang United ====
- Singapore Cup: 2022
