= Singapore Sports School =

Location
- 1 Champions Way; Singapore 737913; Singapore; 1°25′36.21″N 103°47′18.19″E

Information
- Type: Independent
- Motto: Learned Champions With Character
- Established: 2 April 2004; 22 years ago
- Principal: Ong Kim Soon
- Gender: Mixed
- Age: 13 to 19
- Campus: Urban; 7 hectares (17 acres)
- Colour: Red Orange
- Website: www.sportsschool.edu.sg

Singapore Sports School (SSP) is a specialised independent boarding school under the purview of Ministry of Culture, Community and Youth of the Government of Singapore that offers an integrated sports and academic programme to secondary and post-secondary students in Singapore.

== History ==
In the late 1990s, the Ministry of Community Development (MCD), the Singapore Sports Council and the sports community discussed the idea of forming a sports school to develop sports in Singapore. In 2000, the MCD created a new sports division and was renamed Ministry of Community Development and Sports (MCDS). With the rename, Minister for Community Development and Sports Abdullah Tarmugi formally proposed a sports school in Parliament to develop sports in Singapore. In 2001, the government approved the plans and on 2 April 2004, the SSP was opened by Prime Minister Goh Chok Tong.

SSP initially focused on eight sports – athletics, badminton, bowling, football, netball, sailing, swimming and table tennis.

== Management ==
Moo Soon Chong was the first principal of Singapore Sports School. He was assisted by Chua Choon Seng, Director of Corporate Services and Irwin Seet, Director of Sports, Seah Poh Chua, Director of Academics and School Administration, who was Dean of the Academic Wing then, and a core team.

Moo Soon Chong retired on 14 December 2007 and Deborah Tan was appointed as the new principal of Singapore Sports School on the following day. Deborah Tan was appointed to a senior position at the Ministry of Education and left the school on 14 December 2013.

Followed by Deborah Tan's departure, Tan Teck Hock is appointed as the new principal of Singapore Sports School. Tan Teck Hock had served in the Education Service since 1992. He was the principal of Yishun Town Secondary School from December 1999 to December 2005 and Serangoon Junior College from December 2006 to December 2010. Tan Teck Hock was the founding Principal of the Physical Education and Sports Teacher Academy in 2010.

On 15 December 2019, Singapore Sports School announced that Ong Kim Soon would replace Tan Teck Hock. Ong Kim Soon was a PE and English teacher, head of department, vice-principal and special assistant of the principal at Saint Hilda's Secondary School, and Director of Physical, Sports, and Outdoor Education in the Ministry of Education Headquarters.

== Sport programmes and achievements ==
Student-athletes in Singapore Sports School are either in an Academy Programme or in an Individual Programme.

The Academy Programmes are in the following sports:

- Badminton
- Bowling
- Fencing
- Football
- Netball
- Sailing
- Shooting
- Swimming
- Table Tennis
- Track and Field
- Multi-sport

Singapore Sports School also welcomes high-performing youth athletes to join the Individual Programme sports such as Artistic Swimming, Golf, Gymnastics, Pencak Silat, Sailing Soccer, Martial arts like Wushu, Judo and Taekwondo

== Athlete-Friendly Academic Pathways ==
The Sports School offers the GCE "O" Level Examinations and several post-secondary through-train pathways. Student-athletes on the through-train pathways bypass the GCE "O" Level Examinations and progress onto one of three pathways conducted at Sports School: the International Baccalaureate Diploma Programme (IBDP), the customised Diploma in Sport Management (RP-SSP DSPM) from Republic Polytechnic or the customised Diploma in Business Studies (Entrepreneurship Management Option) (BS-EMGT) from Ngee Ann Polytechnic.

== Singapore 2010 Youth Olympic Games ==
Singapore Sports School was the venue for the modern pentathlon, shooting and swimming events of the 2010 Summer Youth Olympics held in Singapore.

== Notable alumni ==
- Au Yeong Wai Yhann, Squash player
- Calvin Kang, Sprinter
- Dipna Lim Prasad, Hurdler
- Mylene Ong, Swimmer
- Tao Li, Swimmer
- Narelle Kheng, Actress and singer
- Benjamin Kheng, Actor and singer
- Ben Davis, Footballer
- Jess Lim, Track and field, 2022 India Open and 2022 Commonwealth Games Champion Mixed Doubles
- Loh Kean Yew, Badminton player and 2021 BWF World Champion
