= 2024–25 Balestier Khalsa FC season =

Balestier Khalsa
2024–25 season
- Chairman: S Thavaneson
- Head coach: Peter De Roo
- Stadium: Bishan Stadium
Home colours	Away colours

The 2024–25 season was Balestier Khalsa's 29th consecutive season in the top flight of Singapore football and in the Singapore Premier League and the Singapore Cup.

== Season review ==
=== Pre-season ===
The 2024–25 Singapore Premier League season will be the first season to be played having a two-year schedule where Balestier Khalsa participated in the 2024 interim pre-season tournament from 23 February until 19 April. The interim pre-season tournament ensure that the players are adequately prepared for an extended new season that will span nearly 12 months. The Tigers' 2023 season was a bittersweet symphony. Though their 4th-place finish was a record high, it came at a steep price: the departure of nearly half the roster. On 19 April 2024, Balestier Khalsa alongside Brunei DPMM and Laos club Young Elephants was invited by Malaysia Super League club Selangor to participate in the 2024 Selangor Asia Challenge pre-season mini tournament on 26 and 28 April respectively.

=== Transfers ===
Top scorer Shuhei Hoshino, national team star Daniel Goh, and captain Ho Wai Loon all left for Albirex Niigata (S). However, head coach Peter De Roo remained at the helm, building a squad including current players such as Darren Teh, Ignatius Ang, Elijah Lim, Emmeric Ong, Japanese player Masahiro Sugita and Croatian player Alen Kozar. Returning to the team were former players Tajeli Salamat and Hafiz Ahmad.

== Squad ==
=== Singapore Premier League ===
As of 21 February 2024

No.	Name	Nationality	Date of birth (age)	Previous club	Contract since	Contract end
Goalkeepers
16	Martyn Mun	(Singapore)	7 January 2000 (age 26)	(Singapore) Young Lions	2020	2025
21	Hafiz Ahmad	(Singapore)	30 December 1998 (age 27)	(Singapore) Geylang International	2024	2025
43	Hồ Tùng Hân ^{FP U21}	(Vietnam)	10 May 2003 (age 23)	(Vietnam) SHB Da Nang (V1)	2025	2025
Defenders
2	Darren Teh	(Singapore)	9 September 1996 (age 30)	(Singapore) Geylang International	2022	2026
4	Jared Gallagher	(Singapore) (Republic of Ireland)	18 January 2002 (age 24)	(Singapore) BG Tampines Rovers	2025	2025
5	Emmeric Ong	(Singapore)	25 January 1991 (age 35)	(Singapore) Tanjong Pagar United	2023	2025
6	Madhu Mohana	(Singapore)	6 March 1991 (age 35)	(Singapore) Tampines Rovers	2022	2025
11	Harith Kanadi	(Singapore)	1 August 2000 (age 26)	(Singapore) Lion City Sailors	2024	2025
20	Fudhil I’yadh	(Singapore)	18 August 2001 (age 25)	(Singapore) Lion City Sailors U21	2023	2026
23	Syukri Noorhaizam	(Singapore)	14 December 1999 (age 26)	(Singapore) Tiong Bahru (NFL)	2020	2025
25	Irfan Mika'il Abdullah	(Singapore)	11 May 2003 (age 23)	Singapore Sports School	2022	2025
31	Cher Deng ^{FP U21}	(Australia) (South Sudan)	30 June 2005 (age 21)	(Australia) CCM Academy (A2)	2025	2025
36	Abdil Qaiyyim Mutalib	(Singapore)	14 May 1989 (age 37)	(Singapore) Hougang United	2025	2025
Midfielders
8	Alen Kozar	(Slovenia)	7 April 1995 (age 31)	(Slovenia) NŠ Mura (S1)	2023	2026
14	Elijah Lim Teck Yong	(Singapore)	8 May 2001 (age 25)	(Singapore) Young Lions	2023	2025
18	Masahiro Sugita	(Japan)	24 November 1999 (age 26)	(Japan) Albirex Niigata (S)	2023	2025
27	Reycredo Beremanda ^{FP U21}	(Indonesia)	27 January 2004 (age 22)	(Indonesia) Nusantara United (I2)	2024	2025
30	Ignatius Ang	(Singapore)	12 November 1992 (age 34)	(Singapore) Tanjong Pagar United	2022	2025
47	Sheikh Faris	(Singapore)	18 February 1999 (age 27)	(Singapore) Project Vault FC	2025	2025
Forwards
9	Riku Fukashiro	(Japan)	12 April 2000 (age 26)	(Japan) Albirex Niigata (S)	2024	2025
10	Kodai Tanaka	(Japan)	23 December 1999 (age 26)	(Singapore) Lion City Sailors	2024	2025
15	Anton Fase	(Netherlands) (Suriname)	6 February 2000 (age 26)	(Lithuania) Kauno Žalgiris (L1)	2025	2025
19	Amiruldin Asraf	(Singapore)	8 January 1997 (age 29)	(Singapore) Young Lions	2024	2025
24	N.Sakthivelchezhian	(Singapore)	9 December 2002 (age 23)	(Singapore) SAFSA	2020	2025
45	Tariq Shahid Akbar	(Singapore) (India)		(Singapore) Geylang International U21	2024	2025
Players who left during season on loan
15	Lewis Lee Chih Yuan	(Singapore)	21 October 2005 (age 21)	Youth Team	2022	2023
Players who left during season permanently
1	Mukundan Maran	(Singapore)	21 July 1998 (age 28)	(Singapore) Hougang United	2023	2024
3	Tajeli Salamat	(Singapore)	7 February 1994 (age 32)	(Singapore) Tanjong Pagar United	2024	2025
7	Ismail Sassi	(Tunisia) (France)	24 December 1991 (age 34)	(Tunisia) AS Marsa (T1)	2024	2025
13	Amer Hakeem	(Singapore)	8 November 1998 (age 28)	(Singapore) Young Lions	2021	2025
17	Jordan Emaviwe	(Singapore) (Nigeria)	9 April 2001 (age 25)	(Singapore) Young Lions	2020	2025
22	Wayne Chew	(Singapore)	22 October 2001 (age 25)	(Singapore) Young Lions	2023	2025
	Ryan Praveen	(Singapore)	28 May 2002 (age 24)	(Singapore) SAFSA	2020	2025

Notes

^{FP U21} These players are registered as U21 foreign players.

== Coaching staff ==
First Team

Position	Name	Ref.
Team Manager	(Singapore) Darwin Jalil (till Apr 2025)	
General Manager	Tim Nee Cheng	
Head Coach	(Netherlands) Peter de Roo	
Assistant Coach & Performance Analyst	(Singapore) Razif Ariff	
Assistant Coach	(Singapore) Abdul Musawir	
Goalkeeping Coach	(Singapore) Yazid Yasin	
Physiotherapist	(Singapore) Danial Feriza	
Kitman	(Singapore)	

Youth and Women Team

Position	Name	Ref.
Head Coach (Women)	(Singapore) Stephen Rajah (till Dec 2024) (Singapore) Farhan Farook (till Jan 2025)	
Head of Youth Development	(Singapore) Indra Sahdan	
U21 Coach	(Singapore)	
U17 Coach	(Singapore) Ali Imran Lomri	
U15 Coach	(Singapore) (China) Qiu Li	
U14 Coach	(Singapore) Jonathan Xu (Singapore) (China) Qiu Li	
U13 Coach	(England) Mark Siddle	

== Transfer ==
=== In ===
Pre-Season

Position	Player	Transferred From	Team	Ref
GK	(Singapore) Hafiz Ahmad	(Singapore) Geylang International	First team	Free
DF	(Singapore) Harith Kanadi	(Singapore) Lion City Sailors	First Team	Free
DF	(Singapore) Tajeli Salamat	(Singapore) Tanjong Pagar United	First team	Free
MF	(Singapore) Shahreez Basheer	(Singapore) Hougang United U17	U21	Free
MF	(Singapore) Syahmi Indallah	(Singapore) Tanjong Pagar United U21	U21	Free
FW	(Tunisia) (France) Ismail Sassi	(Tunisia) AS Marsa	First Team	Free
FW	(Japan) Riku Fukashiro	(Japan) Albirex Niigata (S)	First Team	Free
FW	(Japan) Kodai Tanaka	(Singapore) Lion City Sailors	First Team	Free
FW	(Singapore) Amiruldin Asraf	(Singapore) Young Lions	First Team	Free

Note 1: .

Mid-Season

Position	Player	Transferred From	Team	Ref
DF	(Australia) (South Sudan) Cher Deng	(Australia) Central Coast Mariners Academy	First Team	Free
DF	(Singapore) Abdil Qaiyyim Mutalib	Free Agent	First Team	Free
MF	(Singapore) Sheikh Faris	(Singapore) Project Vault FC	First Team	Free
FW	(Netherlands) (Suriname) Anton Fase	(Lithuania) Kauno Žalgiris	First Team	Free
FW	(Singapore) Heroshi Rudy Kurniawan	(Singapore) Tampines Rovers U17	U17	Free
FW	(Singapore) Tariq Shahid Akbar	(Singapore) Geylang International U21	First Team	Free

=== Loan In ===
Preseason

Position	Player	Transferred from	Team	Ref
MF	(Indonesia) Reycredo Beremanda	(Indonesia) Nusantara United FC	First Team	Season loan

Mid-season

Position	Player	Transferred from	Team	Ref
GK	(Vietnam) Hồ Tùng Hân	(Vietnam) SHB Da Nang	First Team	Season-long loan till May 2025
DF	(Singapore) (Republic of Ireland) Jared Gallagher	(Singapore) BG Tampines Rovers	First Team	Season-long loan till May 2025

=== Loan Return ===
Preseason

Position	Player	Transferred To / From	Team	Ref
GK	(Singapore) Martyn Mun	(Singapore) SAFSA	First Team	End of NS
FW	(Singapore) N. Sakthivelchezhian	(Singapore) SAFSA	First Team	End of NS
FW	(Singapore) Ryan Praveen	(Singapore) SAFSA	First Team	End of NS

=== Out ===
Preseason

Position	Player	Transferred To	Team	Ref
GK	(Singapore) Hairul Syirhan	(Singapore) Geylang International	First Team	Free
DF	(Singapore) Fabian Kwok	Retired	First Team	N.A.
DF	(Singapore) Iqram Rifqi	(Singapore) Starlight Soccerites (SFL1)	First Team	Free
DF	(Singapore) Syabil Hisham	(Singapore) SAFSA	First Team	Free
DF	(Singapore) Aidil Johari	(Japan) Albirex Niigata (S) U21	First Team	Free
DF	(Singapore) (Mali) Sameer Alassane	Singapore Cricket Club (SFL1)	First Team	Free
DF	(Singapore) Bradly Yap Zhi Hao	(Singapore) Tanjong Pagar United U21	U21	Free
DF	(New Zealand) Curtis Gray	(Singapore) Tanjong Pagar United U21	U21	Free
MF	(Singapore) Ho Wai Loon	(Japan) Albirex Niigata (S)	First Team	Free
MF	(Singapore) Farhan Sahlan	(Japan) Albirex Niigata (S) U21	U21	Free
MF	(Singapore) Sahoo Garv	(Singapore) Young Lions	U21	Free
MF	(Singapore) Iftiqar Parizan	Singapore Cricket Club (SFL1)	U21	Free
FW	(Singapore) Daniel Goh	(Japan) Albirex Niigata (S)	First Team	Free
FW	(Japan) Shuhei Hoshino	(Japan) Albirex Niigata (S)	First Team	Free
FW	(Japan) Ryoya Tanigushi	(Singapore) Geylang International	First Team	Free
FW	(Singapore) Puvan Raj Sivalingam	(Singapore) South Avenue SC (SFL1)	First Team	Free
FW	(Singapore) (Iran) (England) Kian Ghadessy	(Singapore) Lion City Sailors U21	U21	Free
FW	(Singapore) Ryan Peh Jun Wen	(Singapore) Tampines Rovers U21	U21	Free

Mid-season

Position	Player	Transferred To	Team	Ref
GK	(Singapore) Mukundan Maran	(Singapore)	First Team	Free.
GK	(Singapore) Wayne Chew	Retired	First Team	N.A.
DF	(Singapore) Tajeli Salamat	(Singapore) Hougang United	First team	Free
DF	(Singapore) Amer Hakeem	(Singapore)	First team	Free
DF	(Singapore) (Nigeria) Jordan Emaviwe	(Thailand) Chiangrai United	First Team	Free
MF	(Singapore) Shahreez Basheer	(Singapore) Hougang United U17	U21	Free
FW	(Tunisia) (France) Ismail Sassi	(Kuwait) Al-Jazira FC (K2)	First Team	Free
FW	(Singapore) Ryan Praveen	(Singapore) SAFSA	First Team	End of NS

Postseason

Position	Player	Transferred To	Team	Ref
FW	(Japan) Riku Fukashiro	(Singapore) Geylang International	First Team	Free

=== Loan Out ===
Position	Player	Transferred To	Team	Ref
FW	(Singapore) N. Sakthivelchezhian	(Singapore) SAFSA	U21	NS till Dec 2024
FW	(Singapore) Ryan Praveen	(Singapore) SAFSA	U21	NS till Jan 2025
FW	(Singapore) Lewis Lee Chih Yuan	(Singapore) SAFSA	U21	NS till Jan 2026

=== Retained / Extension / Promoted ===
Position	Player	Ref
GK	(Singapore) Mukundan Maran	2 years contract from Jan 2023 till Dec 2024
GK	(Singapore) Wayne Chew	1.5 years contract from Jan 2024 till Jun 2025
DF	(Singapore) Darren Teh	2.5 years contract from Jan 2024 till Jun 2026
DF	(Singapore) Fudhil I’yadh	2.5 years contract from Jan 2024 till Jun 2026
DF	(Singapore) Syukri Noorhaizam	1.5 years contract from Jan 2024 till Jun 2025
DF	(Singapore) Emmeric Ong	1.5 years contract from Jan 2024 till Jun 2025
DF	(Singapore) Irfan Mika'il Abdullah	1.5 years contract from Jan 2024 till Jun 2025
MF	(Singapore) Ignatius Ang	1.5 years contract from Jan 2024 till Jun 2025
MF	(Singapore) Elijah Lim Teck Yong	1.5 years contract from Jan 2024 till Jun 2025
MF	(Japan) Masahiro Sugita	1.5 years contract from Jan 2024 till Jun 2025
MF	(Slovenia) Alen Kozar	2.5 years contract from Jan 2024 till Jun 2026

== Friendly ==
=== Pre-season ===
Win Draw Loss

2024 SPL Interim Tournament – 23 February to 21 April 2024

23 February 2024 1	Balestier Khalsa (Singapore)	7–3	(Japan) Albirex Niigata (S)	Jalan Besar
	Riku Fukashiro 1'; Ismail Sassi 4', 40'; Harith Kanadi 48'; Kodai Tanaka 56'; Alen Kozar 71', 80'		Yohei Otake 42'; Shuhei Hoshino 58'; Arya Igami Tarhani 67'	Stadium: Jalan Besar Stadium; Referee: Ahmad A'qashah

1 March 2024 2	Balestier Khalsa (Singapore)	4–1	(Singapore) Tanjong Pagar United	Bishan
	Kodai Tanaka 4', 16'; Ismail Sassi 59'; Amiruldin Asraf 85'		Faizal Roslan 90+1' (pen.)	Stadium: Bishan Stadium

8 March 2024 3	Balestier Khalsa (Singapore)	3–1	(Singapore) Lion City Sailors	Bishan
	Bill Mamadou 9' (o.g.); Kodai Tanaka 17'; Amiruldin Asraf 85'		Shawal Anuar 54'	Stadium: Bishan Stadium

12 April 2024 4	Balestier Khalsa (Singapore)	3–3	(Singapore) BG Tampines Rovers	Jalan Besar
	Ismail Sassi 25'; Amiruldin Asraf 90', 90+4'		Faris Ramli 7', 64'; Shah Shahiran 36'	Stadium: Jalan Besar Stadium

19 April 2024 5	Balestier Khalsa (Singapore)	1–1	(Singapore) Young Lions	Bishan
	Riku Fukashiro 14'		69'	Stadium: Bishan Stadium

2024 Selangor Asia Challenge – 26 to 28 April 2024

26 April 2024 1	Balestier Khalsa (Singapore)	1–0	(Laos) Young Elephants	Petaling Jaya
	Kodai Tanaka 42' (pen.)			Stadium: Petaling Jaya Stadium

28 April 2024 2	Balestier Khalsa (Singapore)	3–3	(Brunei) DPMM	Petaling Jaya
	Masahiro Sugita 6'; Kodai Tanaka 19'; Alen Kozar 64'		Hakeme Yazid Said 26', 35'; Azwan Ali Rahman 45'	Stadium: Petaling Jaya Stadium

=== Mid Season ===
14 October 2024 1	Johor Darul Ta'zim (Malaysia)	8–0	(Singapore) Balestier Khalsa	Johor
				Stadium: Sultan Ibrahim Stadium

4 January 2025 2	Tanjong Pagar United (Singapore)	3–3	(Singapore) Balestier Khalsa	Jurong East
				Stadium: Jurong East Stadium

== Team statistics ==
=== Appearances and goals ===
As of 25 May 2025

No.	Pos.	Player	SPL		Singapore Cup		Total	
No.	Pos.	Player	Apps.	Goals	Apps.	Goals	Apps.	Goals
2	DF	(Singapore) Darren Teh	30+1	0	4	0	35	0
4	MF	(Singapore) (Republic of Ireland) Jared Gallagher	9	0	4	0	13	0
5	DF	(Singapore) Emmeric Ong	1+6	0	0+1	0	8	0
6	DF	(Singapore) Madhu Mohana	27	3	4	0	31	3
8	MF	(Slovenia) Alen Kozar	30	4	2	0	32	4
9	FW	(Japan) Riku Fukashiro	32	8	4	0	36	8
10	FW	(Japan) Kodai Tanaka	31+1	24	4	6	36	30
11	DF	(Singapore) Harith Kanadi	22+7	1	3+1	0	33	1
14	MF	(Singapore) Elijah Lim Teck Yong	3+7	1	0+3	0	13	1
15	FW	(Netherlands) (Suriname) Anton Fase	12	7	3	2	15	9
16	GK	(Singapore) Martyn Mun	0	0	0	0	0	0
18	MF	(Japan) Masahiro Sugita	26	2	3	1	29	3
19	FW	(Singapore) Amiruldin Asraf	1+16	2	0+3	0	20	2
20	DF	(Singapore) Fudhil I’yadh	13+11	0	3	0	27	0
21	GK	(Singapore) Hafiz Ahmad	31	0	3	0	34	0
23	DF	(Singapore) Syukri Noorhaizam	0+1	0	0	0	1	0
25	DF	(Singapore) Irfan Mika'il Abdullah	0	0	0	0	0	0
27	MF	(Indonesia) Reycredo Beremanda	0+8	1	1	0	9	1
30	MF	(Singapore) Ignatius Ang	14+12	10	0+4	1	30	11
31	DF	(Australia) (South Sudan) Cher Deng	9+1	0	3	0	13	0
36	DF	(Singapore) Abdil Qaiyyim Mutalib	8+2	0	2	0	12	0
43	GK	(Vietnam) Hồ Tùng Hân	1	0	1	0	2	0
47	DF	(Singapore) Sheikh Faris	0+2	0	0+3	0	5	0
Players who have played this season but had left the club or on loan to other club
1	GK	(Singapore) Mukundan Maran	0	0	0	0	0	0
3	DF	(Singapore) Tajeli Salamat	12+2	0	0	0	14	0
7	FW	(Tunisia) (France) Ismail Sassi	18	13	0	0	18	13
13	DF	(Singapore) Amer Hakeem	5+5	1	0	0	10	1
17	DF	(Singapore) (Nigeria) Jordan Emaviwe	17+1	4	0	0	18	4
22	GK	(Singapore) Wayne Chew	0	0	0	0	0	0

== Competitions ==
=== Overview ===
Results summary (SPL)

Overall								Home						Away					
Pld	W	D	L	GF	GA	GD	Pts	W	D	L	GF	GA	GD	W	D	L	GF	GA	GD
0	0	0	0	0	0	0	0	0	0	0	0	0	0	0	0	0	0	0	0

=== Singapore Premier League ===
Win Draw Loss

10 May 2024 1	Balestier Khalsa (Singapore)	2–2	(Singapore) Geylang International	Bishan
	Kodai Tanaka 57', 81' (pen.); Jordan Emaviwe (yellow card) 18'; Ismail Sassi (yellow card) 33'; Masahiro Sugita (yellow card) 74'		Shakir Hamzah 6' (yellow card) 58'; Tomoyuki Doi 38'; Huzaifah Aziz (yellow card) 15'; Vincent Bezecourt (yellow card) 42'	Stadium: Bishan Stadium; Referee: Farhan Mohd; Man of the Match: (Singapore) Hairul Syirhan

19 May 2024 2	Tanjong Pagar United (Singapore)	0–5	(Singapore) Balestier Khalsa	Jurong East
	Faizal Roslan (yellow card) 49' (yellow-red card) 55'; Anaqi Ismit (yellow card) 88'		Kodai Tanaka 20', 40'; Riku Fukashiro 45', 60'; Amiruldin Asraf 90+1'; Masahiro Sugita (yellow card) 69'	Stadium: Jurong East Stadium; Referee: Syarqawi Buhari; Man of the Match: (Japan) Kodai Tanaka

24 May 2024 3	Balestier Khalsa (Singapore)	2–4	(Singapore) BG Tampines Rovers	Bishan
	Kodai Tanaka 29', 49'; Darren Teh (yellow card) 54'		Boris Kopitović 2' (yellow card) 71'; Seia Kunori 12'; Miloš Zlatković 63'; Faris Ramli 89'	Stadium: Bishan Stadium; Referee: Muhammad Taqi; Man of the Match: (Montenegro) Boris Kopitović

21 June 2024 4	Hougang United (Singapore)	3–3	(Singapore) Balestier Khalsa	Jalan Besar
	Dejan Račić 65' 90+5'; Shahdan Sulaiman 85'; Danish Irfan (yellow card) 55'		Ismail Sassi 42'; Kodai Tanaka 57' (pen.), 61' (yellow card) 62'; Jordan Emaviwe (yellow card) 54'	Stadium: Jalan Besar Stadium; Referee: Oswind Suriya; Man of the Match: (Montenegro) Dejan Račić

29 June 2024 5	Balestier Khalsa (Singapore)	3–2	(Singapore) Young Lions	Bishan
	Alen Kozar 20', 56'; Masahiro Sugita 65'		Itsuki Enomoto 9', 85' (yellow card) 12'; Andrew Aw (yellow card) 41'; Kaisei Ogawa (yellow card) 61'; Khairin Nadim (yellow card) 62'; Kan Kobayashi (yellow card) 87'	Stadium: Bishan Stadium; Referee: Hilmi Fuad; Man of the Match: (Slovenia) Alen Kozar

5 July 2024 6	Balestier Khalsa (Singapore)	4–2	(Brunei) DPMM	Bishan
	Amiruldin Asraf 36'; Amer Hakeem 43'; Ismail Sassi 45+2'; Ignatius Ang 47'; Madhu Mohana (yellow card) 90+2'		Julio Cruz 5'; Gabriel Gama 69'	Stadium: Bishan Stadium; Referee: Zulfiqar Mustaffa; Man of the Match: (Singapore) Amiruldin Asraf

13 July 2024 7	Balestier Khalsa (Singapore)	2–4	(Singapore) Lion City Sailors	Bishan
	Ismail Sassi 68', 83'; Tajeli Salamat (yellow card) 38'; Madhu Mohana (yellow card) 72'; Riku Fukashiro (yellow card) 88'		Bart Ramselaar 60'; Toni Datković 81' (yellow card) 90+6'; Maxime Lestienne 90+1' (pen.), 90+4'; Christopher van Huizen (yellow card) 55'; Hami Syahin (yellow card) 56'; Hariss Harun (yellow card) 66'	Stadium: Bishan Stadium; Referee: Andrea Verolino; Man of the Match: (Belgium) Maxime Lestienne

18 July 2024 8	Albirex Niigata (S) (Japan)	7–2	(Singapore) Balestier Khalsa	Jurong East
	Shingo Nakano 10', 61', 76'; Arya Igami Tarhani 17'; Daniel Goh 44', 65', 74'; Syed Firdaus Hassan (yellow card) 5'; SteviaEgbus Mikuni (yellow card) 58'		Kodai Tanaka 11'; Jordan Emaviwe 82'; Alen Kozar (yellow card) 73'; Tajeli Salamat (yellow card) 86'	Stadium: Jurong East Stadium; Referee: Syarqawi Buhari; Man of the Match: (Japan) Shingo Nakano

24 July 2024 9	Balestier Khalsa (Singapore)	5–2	(Singapore) Tanjong Pagar United	Bishan
	Kodai Tanaka 12', 49', 59' (penalty missed) 81; Ismail Sassi 42'; Ignatius Ang 82'; Jordan Emaviwe (yellow card) 90+2'		Shodai Nishikawa 19', 56'	Stadium: Bishan Stadium; Referee: Oswind Suriya; Man of the Match: (Japan) Kodai Tanaka

28 July 2024 10	Geylang International (Singapore)	4–4	(Singapore) Balestier Khalsa	Jalan Besar
	Tomoyuki Doi 4', 29' (pen.); Vincent Bezecourt 20', 78'; Takahiro Tezuka (yellow card) 37'; Naqiuddin Eunos (yellow card) 62'		Kodai Tanaka 60', 71' (pen.); Ismail Sassi 67' (yellow card) 24'; Ignatius Ang 80'; Alen Kozar (yellow card) 45+1'; Tajeli Salamat (red card) 53'; Amer Hakeem (yellow card) 88'	Stadium: Jalan Besar Stadium; Referee: Taufik Thana; Man of the Match: (Japan) Kodai Tanaka

11 August 2024 11	Balestier Khalsa (Singapore)	2–2	(Singapore) BG Tampines Rovers	Bishan
	Ismail Sassi 45'; Kodai Tanaka 90+6' (pen.); Harith Kanadi (yellow card) 24'; Masahiro Sugita (yellow card) 64'		Seia Kunori 12'; Taufik Suparno 79'; Miloš Zlatković (yellow card) 55'; Shah Shahiran (yellow card) 85'; Amirul Adli (yellow card) 90+5'	Stadium: Bishan Stadium; Referee: Farhan Mohd; Man of the Match: (Japan) Kodai Tanaka

23 August 2024 12	Balestier Khalsa (Singapore)	3–1	(Singapore) Hougang United	Bishan
	Ismail Sassi 6'; Riku Fukashiro 53' (yellow card) 90+5'; Alen Kozar 62'; Madhu Mohana (yellow card) 19'; Hafiz Ahmad (yellow card) 90+2'		Dejan Račić 21'; Hazzuwan Halim (yellow card) 29'; Stjepan Plazonja (yellow card) 83'; Shodai Yokoyama (yellow card) 90+3'	Stadium: Bishan Stadium; Referee: Taufik Thana; Man of the Match: (Japan) Riku Fukashiro

31 August 2024 13	Young Lions (Singapore)	2–7	(Singapore) Balestier Khalsa	Jalan Besar
	Itsuki Enomoto 34' (pen.); Farhan Zulkifli 66'; Raoul Suhaimi (yellow card) 41'; Aqil Yazid (yellow card) 47'		Alen Kozar 10'; Ignatius Ang 22', 64'; Ismail Sassi 57', 76', 78'; Madhu Mohana 90+3'	Stadium: Jalan Besar Stadium; Referee: Zulfiqar Mustaffa; Man of the Match: (Tunisia) (France) Ismail Sassi

13 September 2024 14 (Rescheduled)	DPMM (Brunei)	2–2	(Singapore) Balestier Khalsa	Jalan Besar
	Hakeme Yazid Said 14'; Gabriel 42'; Farshad Noor (yellow card) 45+5'; Nazry Azaman (yellow card) 56'; Hanif Farhan Azman (yellow card) 68'; Julio Cruz (yellow card) 90+10'; Kristijan Naumovski (yellow card) 73' (yellow-red card) 90+10'; Miguel Bragança (yellow card) 90+10'		Riku Fukashiro 33'; Ismail Sassi 90+10'; Kodai Tanaka (yellow card) 74'; Amiruldin Asraf (yellow card) 75'; Madhu Mohana (red card) 86'	Stadium: Jalan Besar Stadium (Note: Match rescheduled & location changed due to Radio Television Brunei not able to broadcast the match); Referee: Clarence Leow; Man of the Match: (Brazil) Gabriel Gama

22 September 2024 15	Lion City Sailors (Singapore)	3–1	(Singapore) Balestier Khalsa	Bishan
	Abdul Rasaq 11'; Christopher van Huizen 26'; Sergio Carmona 72'; Lionel Tan (yellow card) 89'		Jordan Emaviwe 68'	Stadium: Bishan Stadium; Referee: Taufik Thana; Man of the Match: (Spain) Sergio Carmona

28 September 2024 16	Balestier Khalsa (Singapore)	2–3	(Japan) Albirex Niigata (S)	Bishan
	Riku Fukashiro 9'; Jordan Emaviwe 90+2'; Ismail Sassi (yellow card) 52' (yellow-red card) 58'		Shingo Nakano 5', 75'; Jordan Emaviwe 44' (o.g.); Ryhan Stewart (yellow card) 23'; Yohei Otake (yellow card) 53'; Daniel Goh (yellow card) 90+5'	Stadium: Bishan Stadium; Referee: Farhan Mohd; Man of the Match: (Japan) Shingo Nakano

20 October 2024 17	Balestier Khalsa (Singapore)	1–4	(Singapore) Geylang International	Bishan
	Elijah Lim Teck Yong 74'; Hafiz Ahmad (yellow card) 90+1'		Takahiro Tezuka 14'; Ryoya Tanigushi 52'; Tomoyuki Doi 58'; Zikos Chua 66'; Rio Sakuma (yellow card) 56'; Vincent Bezecourt (yellow card) 81'	Stadium: Bishan Stadium; Referee: Zulfiqar Mustaffa; Man of the Match: (Japan) Ryoya Taniguchi

28 October 2024 18 (Rescheduled)	Tanjong Pagar United (Singapore)	0–5	(Singapore) Balestier Khalsa	Jurong East
	Syahadat Masnawi (yellow card) 42'; Rezza Rezky (yellow card) 50'; Faizal Roslan (yellow card) 83'; Daniel Elfian (yellow card) 90+3'		Ismail Sassi 14'; Kodai Tanaka 38' (pen.), 49' (penalty missed) 90 Ignatius Ang 46' (yellow card) 44'; Jordan Emaviwe 80'	Stadium: Jurong East Stadium; Referee: Andrea Verolino; Man of the Match: (Japan) Kodai Tanaka

2 November 2024 19	BG Tampines Rovers (Singapore)	3–1	(Singapore) Balestier Khalsa	Jalan Besar
	Irfan Najeeb 48'; Faris Ramli 70'; Seia Kunori 80'; Shah Shahiran (yellow card) 67'; Taufik Suparno (yellow card) 76'; Jared Gallagher (yellow card) 90+1'		Riku Fukashiro 72'; Harith Kanadi (yellow card) 52'; Alen Kozar (yellow card) 76'	Stadium: Jalan Besar Stadium; Referee: Clarence Leow; Man of the Match: (Japan) Seia Kunori

19 January 2025 20	Hougang United (Singapore)	3–1	(Singapore) Balestier Khalsa	Jalan Besar
	Jovan Mugoša 1' (yellow card) 51'; Dejan Račić 32'; Stjepan Plazonja 75' (yellow card) 40'; Zaiful Nizam (yellow card) 90+6'		Madhu Mohana 45+4'	Stadium: Jalan Besar Stadium; Referee: Oswind Suriya; Man of the Match: (Singapore) Zaiful Nizam

25 January 2025 21	Balestier Khalsa (Singapore)	2–3	(Singapore) Young Lions	Bishan
	Anton Fase 48'; Ignatius Ang 53'		Kan Kobayashi 23'; Amir Syafiz 38'; Ethan Pinto 89' (yellow card) 45+1'; Danish Qayyum (yellow card) 90'	Stadium: Bishan Stadium; Referee: Hilmi Fuad; Man of the Match: (Japan) Kan Kobayashi

7 February 2025 22	DPMM (Brunei)	2–3	(Singapore) Balestier Khalsa	Bandar Seri Begawan
	Dāvis Ikaunieks 29'; Hakeme Yazid Said 89'; Syafiq Safiuddin Abdul Shariff (yellow card) 26'; Yura Indera Putera Yunos (yellow card) 86'; Najib Tarif (yellow card) 90+3'		Kodai Tanaka 49'; Anton Fase 69'; Riku Fukashiro 90+5'; Hafiz Ahmad (yellow card) 74'	Stadium: Hassanal Bolkiah National Stadium; Referee: Himi Fuad; Man of the Match: (Japan) Riku Fukashiro

23 February 2025 23	Balestier Khalsa (Singapore)	1–5	(Singapore) Lion City Sailors	Bishan
	Kodai Tanaka 87'; Fudhil I’yadh (red card) 37'; Darren Teh (yellow card) 49'; Riku Fukashiro (yellow card) 73'; Jared Gallagher (yellow card) 83'		Lennart Thy 3', 45+2', 49', 72'; Maxime Lestienne 30'; Bailey Wright (yellow card) 45+5'; Rui Pires (yellow card) 46'; Hafiz Nor (yellow card) 87'	Stadium: Bishan Stadium; Referee: Jansen Foo; Man of the Match: (Germany) Lennart Thy

27 February 2025 24	Albirex Niigata (S) (Japan)	4–0	(Singapore) Balestier Khalsa	Jurong East
	Shingo Nakano 38', 45+1'; Yohei Otake 45'; Amy Recha 89'			Stadium: Jurong East Stadium; Referee: Zulfiqar Mustaffa; Man of the Match: (Japan) Shingo Nakano

7 March 2025 25	Geylang International (Singapore)	3–4	(Singapore) Balestier Khalsa	Jalan Besar
	Vincent Bezecourt 45+1'; Tomoyuki Doi 78'; Madhu Mohana 85' (o.g.); Takahiro Tezuka (yellow card) 59'		Kodai Tanaka 25'; Keito Hariya 60' (o.g.); Harith Kanadi 68'; Ignatius Ang 90+8'; Elijah Lim Teck Yong (yellow card) 90+10'	Stadium: Jalan Besar Stadium; Referee: Oswind Suriya; Man of the Match: (Japan) Kodai Tanaka

5 April 2025 26	Balestier Khalsa (Singapore)	3–3	(Singapore) Tanjong Pagar United	Bishan
	Anton Fase 59'; Marcus Mosses 71' (o.g.); Alen Kozar 90+6' (pen.)		Faizal Roslan 11'; Syahadat Masnawi 36'; Zenivio 80'; Marcus Mosses (yellow card) 45+1'; Raihan Rahman (yellow card) 61'; Tomoki Wada (yellow card) 65'; Syed Akmal (yellow card) 90+10'	Stadium: Bishan Stadium; Referee: Jansen Foo; Man of the Match: (Slovenia) Alen Kozar

7 May 2025 27 (Rescheduled)	BG Tampines Rovers (Singapore)	0–1	(Singapore) Balestier Khalsa	Jalan Besar
			Kodai Tanaka 11'; Fudhil I’yadh (yellow card) 33'; Masahiro Sugita (red card) 59'	Stadium: Jalan Besar Stadium; Referee: Ahmad A'Qashah; Man of the Match: (Singapore) Hafiz Ahmad

24 April 2025 28 (Rescheduled)	Balestier Khalsa (Singapore)	2–1	(Singapore) Hougang United	Tampines
	Anton Fase 10'; Riku Fukashiro 70'; Darren Teh (yellow card) 29'; Madhu Mohana (yellow card) 88'		Stjepan Plazonja 53'; Dejan Račić (yellow card) 45'; Ismail Salihović (yellow card) 67'; Anders Aplin (yellow card) 90+1'; Tajeli Salamat (yellow card) 90+5'	Stadium: Our Tampines Hub (Note: Match rescheduled and location changed to Our Tampines Hub due to General Election 2025 and potential closures of selected ActiveSG facilities, including stadiums that are typically used for SPL fixtures); Referee: Andrea Verolino; Man of the Match: (Japan) Kodai Tanaka

3 May 2025 29	Young Lions (Singapore)	0–4	(Singapore) Balestier Khalsa	Tampines
	Amir Syafiz (yellow card) 28' (yellow-red card) 59'; Ryu Hardy Yussri (yellow card) 52'		Kodai Tanaka 4'; Ignatius Ang 40', 41'; Anton Fase 69'; Jared Gallagher (yellow card) 49'; Fudhil I’yadh (yellow card) 54'; Elijah Lim Teck Yong (yellow card) 78'	Stadium: Our Tampines Hub (Note: Location changed to Our Tampines Hub due to General Election 2025 and potential closures of selected ActiveSG facilities, including stadiums that are typically used for SPL fixtures); Referee: Syarqawi Buhari; Man of the Match: (Singapore) Ignatius Ang

11 May 2025 30	Balestier Khalsa (Singapore)	3–4	(Brunei) DPMM	Jalan Besar
	Kodai Tanaka 34'; Madhu Mohana 42'; Anton Fase 45+3'; Jared Gallagher (yellow card) 81'		Dāvis Ikaunieks 32', 63' (pen.), 81' (pen.); Azwan Ali Rahman 68'; Farshad Noor (yellow card) 19'; Yura Indera Putera Yunos (yellow card) 25'; Nazirrudin Ismail (yellow card) 90+5'	Stadium: Jalan Besar Stadium (Note: Location changed to Jalan Besar Stadium due to upgrading of Bishan Stadium for the AFC Champions League 2 Final); Referee: Muhammad Taqi; Man of the Match: (Latvia) Dāvis Ikaunieks

14 May 2025 31 (Rescheduled)	Lion City Sailors (Singapore)	0–1	(Singapore) Balestier Khalsa	Jalan Besar
	Bart Ramselaar (yellow card) 25'; Ali Al Rina (yellow card) 29'; Akram Azman (yellow card) 90+3'		Kodai Tanaka 31' (pen.); Alen Kozar (yellow card) 46'	Stadium: Jalan Besar Stadium (Note: Match rescheduled and location changed to Jalan Besar Stadium due to upgrading of Bishan Stadium for the AFC Champions League 2 Final); Referee: Andrea Verolino; Man of the Match: (Japan) Kodai Tanaka

25 May 2025 32 (Rescheduled)	Balestier Khalsa (Singapore)	3–2	(Japan) Albirex Niigata (S)	Bishan
	Anton Fase 28'; Masahiro Sugita 45'; Reycredo Beremanda 90+5'; Fudhil I’yadh (yellow card) 86'		Koki Kawachi 51', 69' (yellow card) 45+3'; Syed Firdaus Hassan (yellow card) 58'; SteviaEgbus Mikuni (yellow card) 64'; Arshad Shamim (yellow card) 79'	Stadium: Bishan Stadium; Referee: Oswind Suriya

Pos	Team	Pld	W	D	L	GF	GA	GD	Pts	Qualification or relegation
1	Lion City Sailors (C)	32	22	6	4	96	32	+64	72	Qualification for Champions League Two group stage & ASEAN Club Championship (Note: Since the winners of the 2024–25 Singapore Cup, Lion City Sailors, had already qualified for the AFC Champions League Two and ASEAN Club Championship, the spot given to the Singapore Cup winners (Champions League Two) was passed to the second-placed team.)
2	BG Tampines Rovers	32	19	7	6	84	37	+47	64	Qualification for Champions League Two group stage & ASEAN Club Championship
3	Geylang International	32	15	9	8	97	64	+33	54	
4	Balestier Khalsa	32	14	6	12	84	80	+4	48	
5	DPMM (Note: Ineligible for AFC competition spots)	32	12	8	12	54	61	−7	44	Transferred to the 2025–26 Malaysia Super League post-season
6	Albirex Niigata (S)	32	13	3	16	55	71	−16	42	
7	Hougang United	32	7	10	15	61	76	−15	31	
8	Young Lions	32	7	8	17	47	89	−42	29	
9	Tanjong Pagar United	32	3	7	22	35	103	−68	16	

Updated to match(es) played on 25 May 2025. Source: Singapore Premier League
Rules for classification: 1) points; 2) goal difference; 3) number of goals scored; 4) number of wins
(C) Champions

=== Singapore Cup ===
Pos	Team	Pld	W	D	L	GF	GA	GD	Pts	Qualification
1	Lion City Sailors	4	3	1	0	12	4	+8	10	Semi-finals
2	BG Pathum United	4	2	2	0	7	5	+2	8	Semi-finals
3	Balestier Khalsa	4	2	0	2	10	10	0	6	
4	Tanjong Pagar United	4	1	0	3	3	9	−6	3	
5	Geylang International	4	0	1	3	7	11	−4	1	

Source: FAS

2 February 2025 Group Match 1	Geylang International (Singapore)	4–5	(Singapore) Balestier Khalsa	Jalan Besar
	Tomoyuki Doi 5', 44', 81'; Keito Hariya 15'; Hud Ismail (yellow card) 32'		Anton Fase 3'; Kodai Tanaka 26', 50', 58'; Ignatius Ang 60'; Masahiro Sugita (yellow card) 34'; Darren Teh (yellow card) 38'; Harith Kanadi (yellow card) 42'; Abdil Qaiyyim Mutalib (yellow card) 66'	Stadium: Jalan Besar Stadium; Referee: Ahmad A'Qashah

2 March 2025 Group Match 2	Balestier Khalsa (Singapore)	1–2	(Thailand) BG Pathum United	Bishan
	Anton Fase 9'; Kodai Tanaka (penalty missed) 87; Jared Gallagher (yellow card) 67'	Report	Patrik Gustavsson 15'; Nattawut Suksum 45+1' (penalty missed) 45+1; Nuttawut Wongsawang (red card) 25'; Teerapat Pruetong (yellow card) 51'; Sanchai Nontasila (yellow card) 64'	Stadium: Bishan Stadium; Referee: Hilmi Fuad

16 March 2025 Group Match 3	Lion City Sailors (Singapore)	4–1	(Singapore) Balestier Khalsa	Bishan
	Song Ui-young 7'; Bart Ramselaar 25', 88', 90+2'	Report	Kodai Tanaka 52'	Stadium: Bishan Stadium; Referee: Zulfiqar Mustaffa

29 March 2025 Group Match 4	Balestier Khalsa (Singapore)	3–0	(Singapore) Tanjong Pagar United	Bishan
	Kodai Tanaka 12', 18'; Masahiro Sugita 76'		Azim Akbar (yellow card) 75'; Zenivio (yellow card) 90'	Stadium: Bishan Stadium; Referee: Syarqawi Buhari
