= 2022 Hougang United FC season =

Hougang United
2022 season
- Chairman: Bill Ng
- Head coach: Clement Teo
- Stadium: Hougang Stadium
- S.League: 5th
- Singapore Cup: Champion
- AFC Cup: Group stage
- Top goalscorer: League: Pedro Bortoluzo (18); All: Pedro Bortoluzo (22)
Home colours	Away colours

The 2022 season was Hougang United's 25th consecutive season in the Singapore Premier League. After finishing third in the 2021 Singapore Premier League, Hougang qualified for the 2022 AFC Cup.

Hougang won their first trophy since the club was first founded in 1998.

== Review ==
Hougang won their first trophy, the 2022 Singapore Cup.

== Squad ==
=== Singapore Premier League ===
No.	Name	Nationality	Date of birth (age)	Previous club	Contract since	Contract end
Goalkeepers
1	Mukundan Maran	(Singapore)	21 July 1998 (age 28)	(Singapore) Warriors FC	2021	2022
13	Ridhuan Barudin ^{>30}	(Singapore)	23 March 1987 (age 39)	(Singapore) Tampines Rovers	2015	2022
25	Aizil Yazid ^{U23}	(Singapore)	24 December 2004 (age 21)	(Singapore) Albirex Niigata (S)	2021	2022
31	Zainol Gulam	(Singapore)	4 February 1992 (age 34)	(Singapore) Geylang International	2022	2022
Defenders
2	Anders Aplin ^{>30}	(Singapore) (England)	21 June 1991 (age 35)	(Singapore) Geylang International	2020	2022
4	Nazrul Nazari ^{>30}	(Singapore)	11 February 1991 (age 35)	(Singapore) LionsXII	2016	2022
5	Lionel Tan	(Singapore)	5 June 1997 (age 29)	(Singapore) SAFSA (NFL)	2020	2022
16	Faiz Salleh	(Singapore)	17 July 1992 (age 34)	(Singapore) Young Lions FC	2014	2022
20	Muhaimin Suhaimi	(Singapore)	20 February 1995 (age 31)	(Singapore) Young Lions FC	2018	2022
21	Nazhiim Harman ^{U23}	(Singapore)	2 March 1999 (age 27)	(Singapore) Young Lions FC	2022	2022
22	Kishon Philip ^{U23}	(Singapore)	26 November 1999 (age 26)	Youth Team	2021	2022
32	Jordan Nicolas Vestering ^{U23}	(Singapore) (Netherlands)	25 September 2000 (age 25)	(Singapore) NFA U18	2018	2022
Midfielders
6	Kaishu Yamazaki	(Japan)	12 July 1997 (age 29)	(Singapore) Lion City Sailors	2021	2022
11	Afiq Noor	(Singapore)	25 December 1993 (age 32)	(Singapore) Tiong Bahru FC (NFL)	2019	2022
12	Fabian Kwok (Captain) ^{>30}	(Singapore)	17 March 1989 (age 37)	(Singapore) Tampines Rovers	2017	2022
14	Kristijan Krajcek	(Croatia)	1 October 1993 (age 32)	(Singapore) Balestier Khalsa	2022	2022
18	Idraki Adnan ^{U23}	(Singapore)	13 March 1999 (age 27)	(Singapore) Young Lions FC	2021	2022
24	Amir Zalani	(Singapore)	4 December 1996 (age 29)	(Singapore) Home United	2021	2022
30	André Moritz	(Brazil)	6 August 1986 (age 40)	(Brazil) Confiança	2022	2022
37	Zulfahmi Arifin ^{>30}	(Singapore)	5 October 1991 (age 34)	(Thailand) Sukhothai F.C.	2022	2022
Strikers
7	Shahfiq Ghani	(Singapore)	17 March 1992 (age 34)	(Singapore) Geylang International	2018	2022
9	Pedro Bortoluzo	(Brazil)	17 July 1996 (age 30)	(Portugal) U.D. Oliveirense	2022	2022
10	Shawal Anuar ^{>30}	(Singapore)	29 April 1991 (age 35)	(Singapore) Geylang International	2020	2022
17	Shahril Ishak ^{>30}	(Singapore)	23 January 1984 (age 42)	(Singapore) Warriors FC	2021	2022
19	Amy Recha	(Singapore) (Indonesia)	13 May 1992 (age 34)	(Singapore) Geylang International	2022	2022
23	Sahil Suhaimi	(Singapore)	8 July 1992 (age 34)	(Singapore) Warriors FC	2020	2022
Players who left during the season
3	Artur Jesus Vieira	(Brazil)	11 June 1990 (age 36)	(Thailand) Khon Kaen F.C.	2022	2022
8	Hafiz Sujad ^{>30}	(Singapore)	1 November 1990 (age 35)	(Singapore) Tampines Rovers	2019	2022

=== Women's Squad ===
No.	Name	Nationality	Date of birth (age)	Previous club	Contract since	Contract end
Goalkeepers
1	Jasmine Kua	(Singapore)				
19	Gladys Cheng	(Singapore)				
Defenders
2	Yeong Siew Mei	(Singapore)				
3	Ho Wen Jin	(Singapore)				
4	Carissa Lee	(Singapore)				
5	Michelle Lim Jia Yi	(Malaysia)				
12	Christine Gan	(Singapore)				
13	Foo Shini	(Singapore)				
14	Sara Chan	(Singapore)				
21	Shermaine Wong	(Singapore)				
23	Nursafura Ali	(Singapore)				
25	Deanna Lim	(Singapore)				
Midfielders
6	Elizabeth Ong	(Singapore)				
7	Goh Yi Xuan	(Singapore)				
11	Lily Rozana	(Singapore)				
15	Sarah Lum	(Singapore)				
16	Agatha Putri Widjaya	(Indonesia)				
17	Dhaniyah Qasimah	(Singapore)	7 July 2004 (age 22)			
18	Nurul Ardian Baharrudin	(Singapore)				
20	Clara Wong	(Singapore)				
22	Alicia	(Singapore)				
Strikers
8	Peh Chin Ee	(Singapore)				
9	Clae Kho	(Singapore)				
10	Alexis Png	(Singapore)				
24	Tran Thi Thai Khue	(Vietnam)				

== Coaching staff ==
Position	Name	Ref.
General Manager	(Singapore) Matthew Tay	
Team Manager	(Singapore) (Nigeria) Robert Eziakor	
Head Coach (Men)	(Singapore) Clement Teo	
Head Coach (Women)	(Singapore) G.Sivaraj	
Assistant Coach	(Japan) Yuki Fujimoto	
Assistant Coach	(Singapore) Firdaus Kassim	
Goalkeeping Coach	(Australia) Scott Starr	
Head of Youth (COE)	(Croatia) Marko Kraljević	
U17 Coach	(Singapore) (Nigeria) Robert Eziakor	
U15 Coach	(Singapore) Tan Puay Guan	
Fitness Coach	(Singapore) Hairil Amin	
Sports Trainer	(Singapore) Thomas Pang (Singapore) Seishen Gerard	
Physiotherapist	(Singapore) Ain Hassan (Singapore) Maheen Gul (Singapore) Shoban Rahul	
Equipment Team	(Singapore) Richard Lim (Singapore) Wan Azlan	

== Transfers ==
=== In ===
Preseason

Position	Player	Transferred From	Ref
DF	(Singapore) Nazhiim Harman	(Singapore) Young Lions FC	Free
DF	(Brazil) Artur Jesus Vieira	(Thailand) Khon Kaen F.C. (T2)	
MF	(Croatia) Kristijan Krajček	(Singapore) Balestier Khalsa	Free
MF	(Brazil) André Moritz	(Brazil) Confiança	Free
FW	(Brazil) Pedro Bortoluzo	(Portugal) U.D. Oliveirense (P2)	Free
FW	(Singapore) Amy Recha	(Singapore) Geylang International	Free

Mid-season

Position	Player	Transferred From	Ref
GK	(Singapore) Zainol Gulam	Free Agent	NA

Note 1: Artur Jesus Vieira left the club on mutual consent despite signing the contract.

=== Loan Return ===
Preseason

Position	Player	Transferred From	Ref
DF	(Singapore) (Wales) Harhys Stewart	(Singapore) Young Lions FC	Season loan
MF	(Singapore) Nor Hakim Redzuan	(Singapore) Young Lions FC	Season loan
MF	(Singapore) Zulfahmi Arifin	(Thailand) Sukhothai F.C.	Loan Return

Note 1:

Mid-season

Position	Player	Transferred From	Ref
DF	(Singapore) Jordan Vestering	(Singapore) SAFSA	End of NS

=== Out ===
Preseason

Position	Player	Transferred To	Ref
GK	(Singapore) Izwan Mahbud	(Singapore) Lion City Sailors	Free
DF	(Kyrgyzstan) Maksat Dzhakybaliev	(Kyrgyzstan) FC Kaganat	Free
MF	(Singapore) Naufal Azman	(Singapore) Balestier Khalsa	Free
FW	(Japan) Tomoyuki Doi	(Japan) Fujieda MYFC (J3)	Free
FW	(Brazil) Gilberto Fortunato	(Brazil) Morrinhos FC (B2)	Free
FW	(Singapore) Khairul Nizam	(Singapore) Tanjong Pagar United	Free
DF	(Brazil) Artur Jesus Vieira	(Brazil) Capital CF	

Mid-season

Position	Player	Transferred To	Ref
DF	(Singapore) Hafiz Sujad	Retired	

Note 1:

=== Loan out ===
Preseason

Position	Player	Transferred To	Ref
DF	(Singapore) Jordan Vestering	(Singapore) SAFSA	NS till 2022
GK	(Singapore) Heng How Meng	(Singapore) SAFSA	NS till 2023
DF	(Singapore) Sahffee Jubpre	(Singapore) SAFSA	NS till 2023
MF	(Singapore) Nikesh Singh Sidhu	(Singapore) SAFSA	NS till 2023
MF	(Singapore) Zulfahmi Arifin	(Thailand) Sukhothai F.C.	Season loan till May 2022
MF	(Singapore) (Wales) Harhys Stewart	(Singapore) Young Lions FC	Season loan

Note 1: Harhys Stewart returns on loan to GYL for another season.

Note 2: Zulfahmi Arifin loan to Sukhothai was cut short and he returned to the club for the 2022 season.

Note 3: Jordan Vestering will return to the club after completing his NS in June 2022.

=== Retained / Extension ===
Position	Player	Ref
Coach	(Singapore) Clement Teo	
GK	(Singapore) Ridhuan Barudin	
GK	(Singapore) Mukundan Maran	
GK	(Singapore) Aizil Yazid	
DF	(Singapore) Nazrul Nazari	2 years contract signed in 2019 till 2022
DF	(Singapore) Muhaimin Suhaimi	2 years contract signed in 2019 till 2022
DF	(Singapore) Anders Aplin	
DF	(Singapore) Lionel Tan	
DF	(Singapore) Hafiz Sujad	
DF	(Singapore) Faiz Salleh	
DF	(Singapore) Kishon Philip	
MF	(Singapore) Fabian Kwok	
MF	(Singapore) Farhan Zulkifli	
MF	(Singapore) Idraki Adnan	
MF	(Singapore) Afiq Noor	
MF	(Japan) Kaishu Yamazaki	
FW	(Singapore) Shahfiq Ghani	2 years contract signed in 2019 till 2022
FW	(Singapore) Shawal Anuar	2 years contract signed in 2019 till 2022
FW	(Singapore) Sahil Suhaimi	
FW	(Singapore) Shahril Ishak	
FW	(Singapore) Amir Zalani	

== Friendlies ==
=== Pre-Season Friendly ===
Win Draw Loss

=== Mid-season Friendly ===
10 June 2022 1	Johor Darul Ta'zim (Malaysia)	8–0	(Singapore) Hougang United	Johor, Malaysia
	Bergson; Hazwan Bakri; Leandro Velázquez; Moussa Sidibé; Fernando Forestieri; Ramadhan Saifullah			Stadium: Sultan Ibrahim Stadium

== Team statistics ==
=== Appearances and goals ===
As of 19 Nov 2022

No.	Pos.	Player	SPL		Singapore Cup		AFC Cup		Total	
No.	Pos.	Player	Apps.	Goals	Apps.	Goals	Apps.	Goals	Apps.	Goals
1	GK	(Singapore) Mukundan Maran	14	0	0	0	3	0	17	0
2	DF	(Singapore) (England) Anders Aplin	21+3	1	6	0	3	0	32	1
4	DF	(Singapore) Nazrul Nazari	22	1	2+1	0	3	0	27	1
5	DF	(Singapore) Lionel Tan	20+1	0	6	0	3	0	29	0
6	DF	(Japan) Kaishu Yamazaki	19	3	0	0	3	0	22	3
7	FW	(Singapore) Shahfiq Ghani	5+10	1	0+4	0	0+2	0	21	1
9	FW	(Brazil) Pedro Bortoluzo	22+1	18	4	2	3	4	29	24
10	FW	(Singapore) Shawal Anuar	22+2	11	6	3	2+1	0	32	14
11	DF	(Singapore) Afiq Noor	0+12	0	1+3	0	0	0	15	0
12	MF	(Singapore) Fabian Kwok	11+9	1	1+1	0	0	0	22	1
14	MF	(Croatia) Kristijan Krajcek	24+1	7	5	5	3	0	32	12
16	DF	(Singapore) Faiz Salleh	3+1	0	0	0	0	0	4	0
17	FW	(Singapore) Shahril Ishak	4+14	1	0	0	0	0	18	1
18	MF	(Singapore) Idraki Adnan	0+1	0	0	0	0	0	1	0
19	FW	(Singapore) Amy Recha	17+9	7	5+1	1	2+1	1	34	9
20	DF	(Singapore) Muhaimin Suhaimi	11+5	0	4+1	0	0	0	21	0
21	DF	(Singapore) Nazhiim Harman	11+4	0	0+1	0	0	0	16	0
22	DF	(Singapore) Kishon Philip	0+2	0	0	0	0	0	2	0
23	FW	(Singapore) Sahil Suhaimi	17+8	4	5+1	4	2	2	32	10
24	FW	(Singapore) Amir Zalani	3+5	0	0	0	0	0	8	0
25	GK	(Singapore) Aizil Yazid	5+1	0	1+1	0	0	0	8	0
30	MF	(Brazil) André Moritz	12+6	8	3+2	1	2	1	24	10
31	GK	(Singapore) Zainol Gulam	2	0	5	0	0	0	6	0
32	DF	(Singapore) Jordan Vestering	7+1	0	0	0	0+2	0	10	0
37	MF	(Singapore) Zulfahmi Arifin	15+1	1	6	0	0+3	0	24	1
55	MF	(Singapore) Farhan Zulkifli	9+9	1	6	0	1+2	0	26	1
66	MF	(Singapore) Ajay Robson	1+1	0	0+1	0	0	0	3	0
Players who have played this season but had left the club or on loan to other club
3	DF	(Brazil) Artur Jesus Vieira	0	0	0	0	0	0	0	0
8	DF	(Singapore) Hafiz Sujad	4+7	1	0	0	3	0	14	1
13	GK	(Singapore) Ridhuan Barudin	7	0	0	0	0	0	7	0

== Competitions ==
=== Overview ===
Competition	Record							
Competition	P	W	D	L	GF	GA	GD	Win %
Singapore Premier League	28	10	9	9	65	71	−6	35.71
Singapore Cup	2	1	0	1	5	4	+1	50.00
AFC Cup	3	2	0	1	9	9	+0	66.67
Total	31	12	9	10	74	80	−6	38.71

Results summary (SPL)

Overall								Home						Away					
Pld	W	D	L	GF	GA	GD	Pts	W	D	L	GF	GA	GD	W	D	L	GF	GA	GD
28	10	9	9	65	71	−6	39	6	4	4	38	35	+3	4	5	5	27	36	−9

=== Singapore Premier League ===
Win Draw Loss

27 February 2022 1	Lion City Sailors (Singapore)	3–1	(Singapore) Hougang United	Jalan Besar
	Kim 23'; Rifqi 66'; Lopes 86'; Anu (yellow card) 15'	Report	Bortoluzo 7' (yellow card) 61'; Afiq (yellow card) 83'; Teo (yellow card) 90+4'	Stadium: Jalan Besar Stadium; Attendance: 1,000; Referee: Ahmad A'qashah

6 March 2022 2	Tanjong Pagar United (Singapore)	2–2	(Singapore) Hougang United	Jurong East
	Nizam 72'; Nishikawa 88'; Nishiguchi (yellow card) 59'; Amri (yellow card) 90+1'	Report	Nazrul 77'; Yamazaki 79'; Nazhiim (yellow card) 13'; Muhaimin (yellow card) 62'	Stadium: Jurong East Stadium; Referee: Jansen Foo

11 March 2022 3	Hougang United (Singapore)	3–2	(Singapore) Geylang International	Hougang
	Moritz 72' 90'; Recha 74' (pen.); Nazhiim (yellow card) 42'	Report	Žužul 4'; Tezuka 88'; Huzaifah (yellow card) 48'	Stadium: Hougang Stadium; Referee: Muhammad Taqi

18 March 2022 4	Tampines Rovers (Singapore)	7–1	(Singapore) Hougang United	Tampines
	Kopitović 11' 46' 87'; Taufik 22' 50'; Mehmedović 45'; Tan 84'	Report	Shawal 52'; Farhan (yellow card) 40'	Stadium: Our Tampines Hub; Referee: Hilmi Fuad

1 April 2022 5	Hougang United (Singapore)	1–1	(Japan) Albirex Niigata (S)	Hougang
	Sahil 77'; Farhan (yellow card) 25'; Nazhiim (yellow card) 73'	Report	Sugita 44'; Matsuura (yellow card) 90+3'	Stadium: Hougang Stadium; Referee: Taufik Thana

5 April 2022 6	Balestier Khalsa (Singapore)	2–1	(Singapore) Hougang United	Toa Payoh
	Hoshino 24'; Brunčević 52'; Aidil (yellow card) 75'; Ammirul (yellow card) 88'; Khairullah (yellow card) 89'	Report	Sahil 81'; Moritz (yellow card) 44'	Stadium: Toa Payoh Stadium; Referee: Abirami Naidu

10 April 2022 7	Hougang United (Singapore)	2–1	(Singapore) Young Lions FC	Hougang
	Zulfahmi 38'; Sahil 52'; Aplin (yellow card) 60' (red card) 67'; Nazhiim (yellow card) 73'; Bortoluzo (yellow card) 81'; Nazrul (yellow card) 89'	Report	R. Stewart 41'; Qayyum (yellow card) 87'	Stadium: Hougang Stadium; Referee: Clarence Hong Wei Leow

6 May 2022 8	Hougang United (Singapore)	3–4	(Singapore) Lion City Sailors	Hougang
	Moritz 36' 90+4'; Bortoluzo 87'	Report	Lestienne 16'; Kim 24' 42' 56'	Stadium: Hougang Stadium; Referee: Taufik Thana

14 May 2022 9	Hougang United (Singapore)	1–1	(Singapore) Tanjong Pagar United	Hougang
	Bortoluzo 90+3'; Nazhiim (yellow card) 29'; Moritz (yellow card) 39'	Report	Nishiguchi 90'; Aqhari (yellow card) 10'; Faritz (yellow card) 39'; Akram (yellow card) 63'	Stadium: Hougang Stadium; Referee: Andrea Verolino

22 May 2022 10	Geylang International (Singapore)	0–0	(Singapore) Hougang United	Tampines
	Akhbar (yellow card) 74'	Report	Krajcek (yellow card) 50'; Hafiz (yellow card) 70'; Farhan (yellow card) 78'; Tan (yellow card) 90+2'	Stadium: Our Tampines Hub; Referee: Clarence Hong Wei Leow

28 May 2022 11	Hougang United (Singapore)	3–1	(Singapore) Balestier Khalsa	Hougang
	Yamazaki 22'; Hafiz 59' (yellow card) 67'; Krajcek 85'; Aplin (yellow card) 86'	Report	Hoshino 30'; Singh (yellow card) 50'; Aidil (yellow card) 83'	Stadium: Hougang Stadium; Referee: Jansen Foo

19 June 2022 12	Albirex Niigata (S) (Japan)	5–0	(Singapore) Hougang United	Jurong East
	Lee 2'; Tanaka 19' (pen.); Ilhan 53'; Sugita 56'; Idetsu 65'	Report	Nazrul (yellow card) 18' (yellow-red card) 90+1'	Stadium: Jurong East Stadium; Referee: Ahmad A'qashah

5 July 2022 13 (Rescheduled)	Young Lions FC (Singapore)	0–4	(Singapore) Hougang United	Jalan Besar
	Gallagher (yellow card) 69'	Report	Aplin 37'; Sahil 70'; Recha 74'; Shawal 80'; Muhaimin (yellow card) 52'; Tan (yellow card) 82'	Stadium: Jalan Besar Stadium; Referee: Taufik Thana

9 July 2022 14	Lion City Sailors (Singapore)	1–1	(Singapore) Hougang United	Jalan Besar
	Song 71'; Hariss (yellow card) 60'	Report	Krajcek 66'; Vestering (yellow card) 25'; Sahil (yellow card) 38'; Tan (yellow card) 52'	Stadium: Jalan Besar Stadium; Referee: Muhammad Taqi

13 July 2022 15	Hougang United (Singapore)	4–2	(Singapore) Tampines Rovers	Hougang
	Bortoluzo 12' (pen.) 37' 67' (yellow card) 23'; Shawal 90'; Nazrul (yellow card) 31'; Vestering (yellow card) 56'	Report	Nakamura 28'; Kopitović 57'; Reefdy (yellow card) 11'; Firdaus (yellow card) 14'; Amirul (yellow card) 18'; Irfan (yellow card) 38'	Stadium: Hougang Stadium; Referee: Farhad Mohamed

17 July 2022 16	Tanjong Pagar United (Singapore)	2–2	(Singapore) Hougang United	Jurong East
	Raihan 6'; Nishiguchi 38'; Šugić (yellow card) 38'; Faritz (yellow card) 54'	Report	Shawal 8'; Bortoluzo 57' (pen.); Sahil (yellow card) 38'	Stadium: Jurong East Stadium; Referee: Jansen Foo

22 July 2022 17	Hougang United (Singapore)	1–2	(Singapore) Geylang International	Hougang
	Bortoluzo 34'; Maran (yellow card) 64'; Nazrul (yellow card) 68'; Shawal (yellow card) 75'	Report	Bezecourt 77'; Žužul 88'	Stadium: Hougang Stadium; Referee: Taufik Thana

30 July 2022 18	Tampines Rovers (Singapore)	2–4	(Singapore) Hougang United	Tampines
	Kopitović 39' 55'; Nakamura (yellow card) 12'; Taufik (yellow card) 59'; Yasir (yellow card) 60'	Report	Krajcek 29' 87' (yellow card) 90+4'; Yamazaki 57'; Shawal 79'	Stadium: Our Tampines Hub; Referee: Hilmi Faud

5 August 2022 19	Hougang United (Singapore)	3–3	(Japan) Albirex Niigata (S)	Hougang
	Bortoluzo 61' 74'; Shawal 85'; Shahfiq (yellow card) 88'	Report	Sugita 12'; Lee 77'; Idetsu 89'	Stadium: Hougang Stadium; Referee: Muhammad Taqi

12 August 2022 20	Balestier Khalsa (Singapore)	6–1	(Singapore) Hougang United	Toa Payoh
	Hoshino 5' 67' 85' (yellow card) 78'; Singh 21'; Taniguchi 33'; Kondo 73'	Report	Shahfiq 16' (yellow card) 61'; Bortoluzo (yellow card) 50'; Nazrul (yellow card) 76'; Shahril (yellow card) 81'; Afiq (yellow card) 86'	Stadium: Toa Payoh Stadium; Referee: Andrea Verolino

20 August 2022 21	Hougang United (Singapore)	5–1	(Singapore) Young Lions FC	Hougang
	Shawal 22'; Krajcek 32'; Recha 38'; Shahril 59'; Farhan 90+2'; Shahfiq (yellow card) 54'; Aplin (yellow card) 81'	Report	Rasaq 29'; Emaviwe (yellow card) 13'; Gallagher (yellow card) 34'	Stadium: Hougang Stadium; Referee: Jansen Foo

26 August 2022 22	Hougang United (Singapore)	4–9	(Singapore) Lion City Sailors	Hougang
	Shawal 9'; Recha 54' 57'; Bortoluzo 90+3'; Kristijan Krajcek (yellow card) 45'	Report	Henrique 11'; Lopes 13'; Faris 29' 69'; Kim 34' 44' 66'; Lestienne 51'; Song 80' (yellow card) 63'	Stadium: Hougang Stadium; Referee: Andrea Verolino

3 September 2022 23	Hougang United (Singapore)	3–3	(Singapore) Tanjong Pagar United	Hougang
	Shawal 10' 40'; Kwok (yellow card) 31'; Bortoluzo 90' (yellow card) 34'; Afiq (yellow card) 55'	Report	Bennett 25'; Nishikawa 30'; Nishiguchi 31' (pen.); Raihan (yellow card) 34'	Stadium: Hougang Stadium; Referee: Muhammad Taqi

11 September 2022 24	Geylang International (Singapore)	2–4	(Singapore) Hougang United	Tampines
	Akhbar 7'; Faizal 36'; Noor Ali (yellow card) 45+3'	Report	Bortoluzo 42' (yellow card) 45+2'; Moritz 61'; Shawal 85'; Krajcek 90+5'; Kwok (yellow card) 31'; Teo (yellow card) 90+1'	Stadium: Our Tampines Hub; Referee: Abirami Naidu

20 October 2022 25 (Rescheduled)	Hougang United (Singapore)	4–1	(Singapore) Balestier Khalsa	Hougang
	Bortoluzo 7' 90+6'; Krajcek 21'; Moritz 37'	Report	Goh 86'; Teh (yellow card) 66'	Stadium: Hougang Stadium; Referee: Shadiq Al-Hussain

2 October 2022 26	Albirex Niigata (S) (Japan)	1–1	(Singapore) Hougang United	Jurong East
	Tee 73' (yellow card) 87'; Omori (yellow card) 76'	Report	Moritz 29'; Muhaimin (yellow card) 2'; Maran (yellow card) 50'; Robson (yellow card) 84'; Afiq (yellow card) 87'	Stadium: Jurong East Stadium; Referee: Jansen Foo

8 October 2022 27	Hougang United (Singapore)	1–4	(Singapore) Tampines Rovers	Hougang
	Moritz 40' (yellow card) 52'; Nazhiim (red card) 16'; Shawal (yellow card) 54'; Zulfahmi (yellow card) 77'	Report	Taufik 15' 17'; Kopitović 41' 78' (pen.) (penalty missed) 17; Firdaus (yellow card) 36'; Irfan (yellow card) 45'	Stadium: Hougang Stadium; Referee: Farhad Mohamed

15 October 2022 28	Young Lions FC (Singapore)	3–5	(Singapore) Hougang United	Jalan Besar
	Kweh 16'; Qayyum 72'; Emaviwe 89'	Report	Kwok 2'; Bortoluzo 32' 60' 79'; Recha 90'	Stadium: Jalan Besar Stadium; Referee: Taufiq Thana

Pos	Team	Pld	W	D	L	GF	GA	GD	Pts	Qualification or relegation
3	Tampines Rovers (Q)	28	15	5	8	76	57	+19	50	Standby team for AFC Cup group stage
4	Geylang International	28	10	9	9	48	46	+2	39	
5	Hougang United	28	10	9	9	65	71	−6	39	Qualification for AFC Cup group stage (Cup Winner)
6	Tanjong Pagar United	28	10	7	11	59	69	−10	37	
7	Balestier Khalsa	28	7	3	18	45	78	−33	24	

Source: Singapore Premier League
Rules for classification: 1) points; 2) goal difference; 3) number of goals scored; 4) number of wins
(Q) Qualified for the phase indicated

=== AFC Cup ===
Win Draw Loss

==== Group stage ====
Pos	Team	Pld	W	D	L	GF	GA	GD	Pts	Qualification	VIE	HOU	PPC	YEL
1	(Vietnam) Viettel (H)	3	3	0	0	11	3	+8	9	Zonal semi-finals	—	5–2	—	5–1
2	(Singapore) Hougang United	3	2	0	1	9	9	0	6		—	—	4–3	—
3	(Cambodia) Phnom Penh Crown	3	1	0	2	7	7	0	3		0–1	—	—	4–2
4	(Laos) Young Elephants	3	0	0	3	4	12	−8	0		—	1–3	—	—

Source: AFC
Rules for classification: Tiebreakers
(H) Hosts

24 June 2022 1	Hougang United (Singapore)	4–3	(Cambodia) Phnom Penh Crown	Ho Chi Minh City
	Bortoluzo 21'; Recha 29'; Pisa 37' (o.g.); Moritz 60'; Hafiz (yellow card) 24'; Nazrul (yellow card) 51'; Maran (yellow card) 59'	Report	Chanchav 15'; Thiva 19'; Pisa 90+2'; Nieto (yellow card) 21'; Hryshyn (yellow card) 57'; Ogawa (yellow card) 64'	Stadium: Thống Nhất Stadium; Attendance: 368; Referee: Casey Reibelt (Australia); Man of the Match: (Brazil) Pedro Bortoluzo

27 June 2022 2	Young Elephants (Laos)	1–3	(Singapore) Hougang United	Ho Chi Minh City
	Bounkong 5'	Report	Sahil 45' 65'; Bortoluzo 78'; Moritz (yellow card) 44'; Tan (yellow card) 80'	Stadium: Thống Nhất Stadium; Attendance: 388; Referee: Zainiddinov Sayyodjon (Tajikistan)

30 June 2022 3	Viettel FC (Vietnam)	5–2	(Singapore) Hougang United	Ho Chi Minh City
	Paulo 41' (pen.) 43' (pen.) (yellow card) 21'; Đức Hoàng Minh 55'; Magno 70' 72'; Nguyễn (yellow card) 45'	Report	Bortoluzo 15' (pen.) 45+1' (pen.)	Stadium: Thống Nhất Stadium; Referee: Ali Reda (Lebanon)

=== Singapore Cup ===
Pos	Team	Pld	W	D	L	GF	GA	GD	Pts	Qualification
1	Tampines Rovers (Q)	3	2	0	1	7	4	+3	6	Semi-finals
2	Hougang United (Q)	3	2	0	1	6	4	+2	6	Semi-finals
3	Tanjong Pagar United	3	2	0	1	6	6	0	6	
4	Geylang International	3	0	0	3	4	9	−5	0	

Updated to match(es) played on 25 September 2022. Source: FAS
(Q) Qualified for the phase indicated

Win Draw Loss

==== Group ====
28 October 2022 Match 1	Tanjong Pagar United (Singapore)	3–1	(Singapore) Hougang United	Jurong East
	Ricciuto 45' (yellow card) 21'; Nishiguchi 69' 71' (yellow card) 73'	Report	Sahil 17'; Tan (yellow card) 32'; Muhaimin (yellow card) 57'; Zulfahmi (yellow card) 73'; Bortoluzo (yellow card) 90' (yellow-red card) 90+1'	Stadium: Jurong East Stadium; Referee: Hilmi Fuad

1 November 2022 Match 2	Hougang United (Singapore)	4–1	(Singapore) Geylang International	Hougang
	Shawal 34'; Recha 48'; Moritz 55'; Krajcek 75' (yellow card) 45+2'; Aplin (yellow card) 85'; Sahil (yellow card) 90+3'	Report	Hazzuwan 9'; Huzaifah (yellow card) 34'; Ahmad (yellow card) 45'; Pereira (yellow card) 90+3'; Akhbar (yellow card) 90+3'	Stadium: Hougang Stadium; Referee: Muhammad Taqi

6 November 2022 Match 3	Hougang United (Singapore)	1–0	(Singapore) Tampines Rovers	Hougang
	Sahil Suhaimi 53'; Shawal Anuar (yellow card) 37'; Kristijan Krajcek (yellow card) 68'	Report	Ryaan Sanizal (yellow card) 35'; Taufik Suparno (yellow card) 39'; Amirul Haikal (yellow card) 49'; Yasir Hanapi (yellow card) 69'	Stadium: Hougang Stadium; Referee: Taufik Thana

==== Semi-final ====
11 November 2022	Albirex Niigata (S) (Japan)	3–3	(Singapore) Hougang United	Jurong East
	Kan Kobayashi 3'; Kodai Tanaka 27' 38'; Kan Kobayashi (penalty missed) 61; Tatsuya Sambongi (yellow card) 90+3'	Report	Sahil Suhaimi 7' 58' (yellow card) 69'; Shawal Anuar 63'; Farhan Zulkifli (yellow card) 45+2'; Muhaimin Suhaimi (yellow card) 45+5'; Pedro Bortoluzo (yellow card) 50'; Shahfiq Ghani (yellow card) 90+2'	Stadium: Jurong East Stadium; Referee: Andrea Verolino

15 November 2022	Hougang United (Singapore)	4–2	(Japan) Albirex Niigata (S)	Hougang
	Shawal Anuar 26'; Pedro Bortoluzo 57' 74'; Kristijan Krajcek 90+3'	Report	Ilhan Fandi 77'; Tadanari Lee 90+2'; Masaya Idetsu (yellow card) 62'	Stadium: Hougang Stadium; Referee: Farhad Mohamed

Hougang United won 7–5 on aggregate.

==== Final ====
19 November 2022	Hougang United (Singapore)	3–2	(Singapore) Tampines Rovers	Jalan Besar
	Kristijan Krajcek 17' 57' 79' (yellow card) 58'; Pedro Bortoluzo (yellow card) 45+2'; Zulfahmi Arifin (yellow card) 45+2'; Zainol Gulam (yellow card) 87'; Nazrul Nazari (yellow card) 90+3'	Report	Taufik Suparno 39'; Irfan Najeeb 48'; Taufik Suparno (yellow card) 83'	Stadium: Jalan Besar Stadium; Referee: Ahmad A'qashah
