= Anton Fase =

Dutch footballer (born 2000)

Personal information
- Full name: Anton Quinten Olivier Fase
- Date of birth: 6 February 2000 (age 26)
- Place of birth: Haarlem, Netherlands
- Height: 1.85 m (6 ft 1 in)
- Position: Forward

Team information
- Current team: Lokomotiv Plovdiv
- Number: 17

Youth career
- HFC EDO
- –2011: VEW
- 2011–2015: SV Hoofddorp
- 2015–2017: AZ

Senior career*
Years	Team	Apps	(Gls)
2017–2020	Jong AZ	7	(1)
2020–2021	NEC	9	(0)
2021–2022	Botev Vratsa	12	(0)
2022–2023	Kauno Žalgiris	32	(11)
2023–2024	ŁKS Łódź	5	(0)
2023–2024	ŁKS Łódź II	5	(1)
2024–2025	Kauno Žalgiris	8	(0)
2025	Balestier Khalsa	12	(7)
2025–2026	PSIM Yogyakarta	9	(2)
2026–	Lokomotiv Plovdiv	0	(0)
- * Club domestic league appearances and goals as of 17:14, 4 September 2026 (UTC)

Anton Quinten Olivier Fase (born 6 February 2000) is a Dutch professional footballer who plays as a forward for Bulgarian First League club Lokomotiv Plovdiv.

== Club career ==
=== Jong AZ ===
Fase made his Eerste Divisie debut for Jong AZ on 1 September 2017 in a game against Jong Utrecht, coming on as a late substitute for Abdel Malek El Hasnaoui. In total, he only made seven appearances and one goal for Jong AZ for three seasons, partly due to an upper leg injury that kept him out of circulation for most of the 2019–20 season.

=== NEC ===
Fase signed a one-year contract with NEC in July 2020, with an option for an additional year. He made his debut for the club on 11 September in a 2–1 win over Jong Ajax, coming on for Ole Romeny after 69 minutes.

=== Botev Vratsa ===
In November 2021, Fase moved to Bulgarian club Botev Vratsa, signing a two-year contract. On 1 May 2022, it was confirmed that he had departed the team by mutual consent.

=== Kauno Žalgiris ===
On 23 July 2022, Fase joined Lithuanian club Kauno Žalgiris.

=== ŁKS Łódź ===
On 18 August 2023, Fase moved to Polish Ekstraklasa side ŁKS Łódź. After making twelve appearances across all competitions for ŁKS's main and reserve teams, he left the club by mutual consent on 28 March 2024.

=== Return to Kauno Žalgiris ===
On 25 July 2024, Fase rejoined Kauno Žalgiris.

=== Balestier Khalsa ===
On 19 January 2025, Fase moved to Southeast Asia to join Singapore Premier League side Balestier Khalsa, joining his countryman, head coach Peter de Roo. He made his debut later in the day in a 3–1 loss to Hougang United. Fase scored his first goal for the club in a 3–2 loss to Young Lions on 25 January.

=== PSIM Yogyakarta ===
On 13 August 2025, Fase moved to Indonesia to join Super League side PSIM Yogyakarta.

== Personal life ==
Born in the Netherlands, Fase is of Surinamese descent therefore make him eligible to represent Netherlands or Suriname.

== Career statistics ==
As of match played 23 December 2025

Appearances and goals by club, season and competition
Club	Season	League			National cup (Note: Includes KNVB Cup, Lithuanian Cup, Polish Cup, Singapore Cup)		Continental		Total	
Club	Season	Division	Apps	Goals	Apps	Goals	Apps	Goals	Apps	Goals
NEC	2020–21	Eerste Divisie	9	0	2	0	—		11	0
Botev Vratsa	2021–22	Bulgaria First League	12	0	0	0	—		12	0
Kauno Žalgiris	2022	A Lyga	17	9	2	1	—		19	10
Kauno Žalgiris	2023	A Lyga	15	2	1	0	2 (Note: Appearances in UEFA Europa Conference League)	1	18	3
Kauno Žalgiris	Total		32	11	3	1	2	1	37	13
ŁKS Łódź	2023–24	Ekstraklasa	5	0	2	1	—		7	1
ŁKS Łódź II	2023–24	II liga	5	1	—		—		5	1
Kauno Žalgiris	2024	A Lyga	8	0	1	0	—		9	0
Balestier Khalsa	2024–25	Singapore Premier League	12	7	3	2	0	0	15	9
PSIM Yogyakarta	2025–26	Super League	9	2	0	0	0	0	9	2
Career total			92	21	11	4	2	1	105	26
