= Mukundan Maran =

Singaporean footballer

Personal information
- Full name: Mukundan Maran
- Date of birth: 21 July 1998 (age 28)
- Place of birth: Singapore
- Position: Goalkeeper

Team information
- Current team: Balestier Khalsa
- Number: 1

Youth career
- 2017: Warriors FC

Senior career*
Years	Team	Apps	(Gls)
2018–2021	Warriors FC	18	(0)
2021–2022	Hougang United	14	(0)
2023– 2024	Balestier Khalsa	0	(0)
- * Club domestic league appearances and goals as of 5 Feb 2021 ‡ National team caps and goals as of 29 Apr 2024

Mukundan Maran (born 21 July 1998), also known as just Mukun, was a Singaporean professional footballer who most recently played as a goalkeeper for Singapore Premier League club Balestier Khalsa.

== Club career ==
In 2017, Mukundan signed for S.League club Warriors FC. A year later, he was promoted to the first team and made 21 appearances in the 2018 season at the age of 19. He made the semi-finals of the A Division, where he failed to keep out any penalties in the shootout against Catholic Junior College, following a 1-1 draw.

In January 2019, Mukundan served his compulsory National Service until December 2020.

=== Hougang United ===
On 4 January 2021, Mukundan joined Hougang United ahead of the 2022 season. He played in all three of the club's 2022 AFC Cup match fixtures at the Thống Nhất Stadium in Ho Chi Minh City, Vietnam. He pulled a couple of heroic saves against Laos club, Young Elephants which Hougang won the game 3–1. He went on to become the club's first choice keeper throughout the first half of the season.

On 19 November 2022, Mukundan won the 2022 Singapore Cup where it was the club's first ever piece of silverware.

== International career ==
In September 2022, Mukundan was called up to the Singapore national team for the 2022 VFF Tri-Nations Series tournament against Vietnam and India on 21 and 24 September. However, he didn't make any cap up till.

== Career statistics ==
=== Club ===
As of 21 April 2021.

Club	Season	League			Cup		Continental		Other		Total	
Club	Season	Division	Apps	Goals	Apps	Goals	Apps	Goals	Apps	Goals	Apps	Goals
Warriors FC	2017	S.League	0	0	0	0	1	0	0	0	1	0
Warriors FC	2018	Singapore Premier League	18	0	2	0	0	0	0	0	20	0
Warriors FC	Total		18	0	2	0	1	0	0	0	21	0
Hougang United	2021	Singapore Premier League	4	0	0	0	0	0	0	0	4	0
Hougang United	2022	Singapore Premier League	14	0	0	0	0	0	3	0	17	0
Hougang United	Total		18	0	0	0	0	0	3	0	21	0
Balestier Khalsa	2023	Singapore Premier League	0	0	0	0	0	0	0	0	0	0
Balestier Khalsa	2024–25	Singapore Premier League	0	0	0	0	0	0	0	0	0	0
Balestier Khalsa	Total		0	0	0	0	0	0	0	0	0	0
Career total			34	0	2	0	1	0	3	0	42	0

== Honours ==
=== Club ===
Hougang United

- Singapore Cup: 2022
