= Kodai Tanaka =

Japanese footballer (born 1999)

Personal information
- Full name: Kodai Tanaka
- Date of birth: 23 December 1999 (age 26)
- Place of birth: Kanagawa, Japan
- Height: 1.76 m (5 ft 9 in)
- Position: Forward

Team information
- Current team: PSM Makassar
- Number: 14

Youth career
- –2014: Yokohama F. Marinos
- 2015–2017: Tokai Univ. Kofu High School

College career
Years	Team	Apps	(Gls)
2018–2021	Takushoku University		

Senior career*
Years	Team	Apps	(Gls)
2022	Albirex Niigata (S)	28	(33)
2023	Lion City Sailors	3	(3)
2024–2025	Balestier Khalsa	32	(24)
2025–2026	Persis Solo	19	(7)
2026	→ Dewa United Banten (loan)	3	(0)
2026–	PSM Makassar	5	(2)
- * Club domestic league appearances and goals as of 16 October 2026

Kodai Tanaka (田中 幸大, Tanaka Kodai; born 23 December 1999) is a Japanese professional footballer who plays as a forward for Super League club PSM Makassar

Kodai won the 2022 Singapore Premier League 'Player Of The Year' and was nominated for 2022 season 'Team Of The Year'. He is known for his powerful shots with either foots and finisher in the box.

== Youth career ==
Kodai came through the ranks of the Yokohama F. Marinos youth team and then Tokai University Kofu High School and Takushoku University before being picked up by Albirex Niigata (S).

== Club career ==
=== Albriex Niigata Singapore ===
Kodai started his professional career with Albirex Niigata (S) in the 2022 Singapore Premier League. In his first 11 matches, he has notched 12 goals, of which 7 had come from headers. As part of Albirex's "LIT" frontline comprising ex-Southampton and Japan man Tadanari Lee, Ilhan Fandi and himself, the trio have combined for 57 goals in 26 league matches - more than five of the other seven teams in the SPL, with Kodai himself notching 31 goals. He ended his first professional season with 5 hat-tricks and as the second top goalscorer in the league, with 33 goals in 28 games.

=== Lion City Sailors ===
Alongside Zharfan Rohaizad, Rusyaidi Salime and Shawal Anuar, Kodai joined the Sailors in December 2022.

Kodai started off his season with three goals and two assists. In the next match against his former team on 9 March 2023, he was ruled out for the season with an ACL injury. He make his returned on 8 November 2023 coming on as a substitution in the 2023–24 AFC Champions League match against Jeonbuk Hyundai Motors. On 15 December 2023, Lion City Sailors announced that Kodai will leave the club at the end of the 2023 season following the expiry of his contract.

=== Balestier Khalsa ===
On 8 February 2024, Kodai moved to another Singapore Premier League club, Balestier Khalsa. On 10 May, Kodai scored his first goal for the club on his debut by scoring a brace from a 2–0 deficit to a 2–2 draw against Geylang International on the 2024–25 season opening match. Kodai went on to scored a brace in four consecutive matches on 19 May in a 5–0 win over Tanjong Pagar United, on 24 May in a 4–2 defeat to Tampines Rovers and on 21 June in a 3–3 draw to Hougang United. During the club first fixtures of the 2024–25 Singapore Cup on 2 February, Kodai scored a hat-trick in a 5–4 thrilling win.

=== Persis Solo ===
On 4 July 2025, Kodai moved to Liga 1 club Persis Solo joining his former head coach, Peter de Roo who also joined Persis Solo.

== Career statistics ==
=== Club ===
As of 19 September 2026.

Club	Season	League			Cup		ACL / AFC		Total	
Club	Season	Division	Apps	Goals	Apps	Goals	Apps	Goals	Apps	Goals
Albirex Niigata (S)	2022	Singapore Premier League	28	33	4	6	0	0	32	39
Albirex Niigata (S)	Total		28	33	4	6	0	0	32	39
Lion City Sailors	2023	Singapore Premier League	3	3	0	0	3	0	6	3
Lion City Sailors	Total		3	3	0	0	3	0	6	3
Balestier Khalsa	2024–25	Singapore Premier League	32	24	4	6	0	0	36	30
Balestier Khalsa	Total		32	24	4	6	0	0	36	30
Persis Solo	2025–26	Super League	19	7	0	0	0	0	19	7
Persis Solo	Total		19	7	0	0	0	0	19	7
Dewa United (loan)	2025–26	Super League	3	0	0	0	0	0	3	0
Dewa United (loan)	Total		3	0	0	0	0	0	3	0
PSM Makassar	2026–27	Super League	3	1	0	0	0	0	3	1
PSM Makassar	Total		3	1	0	0	0	0	3	1
Career total			88	68	8	12	3	0	99	80

== Honours ==
=== Club ===
==== Albriex Niigata (S) ====
- Singapore Premier League: 2022

==== Lion City Sailors ====
- Singapore Cup: 2023

=== Individual ===
==== Albirex Niigata (S) ====
- Singapore Premier League Player of the Year: 2022
- Singapore Premier League Team of the Year: 2022
- Singapore Premier League Player of the Month: July 2022
