= Alen Kozar =

Slovenian footballer (born 1995)

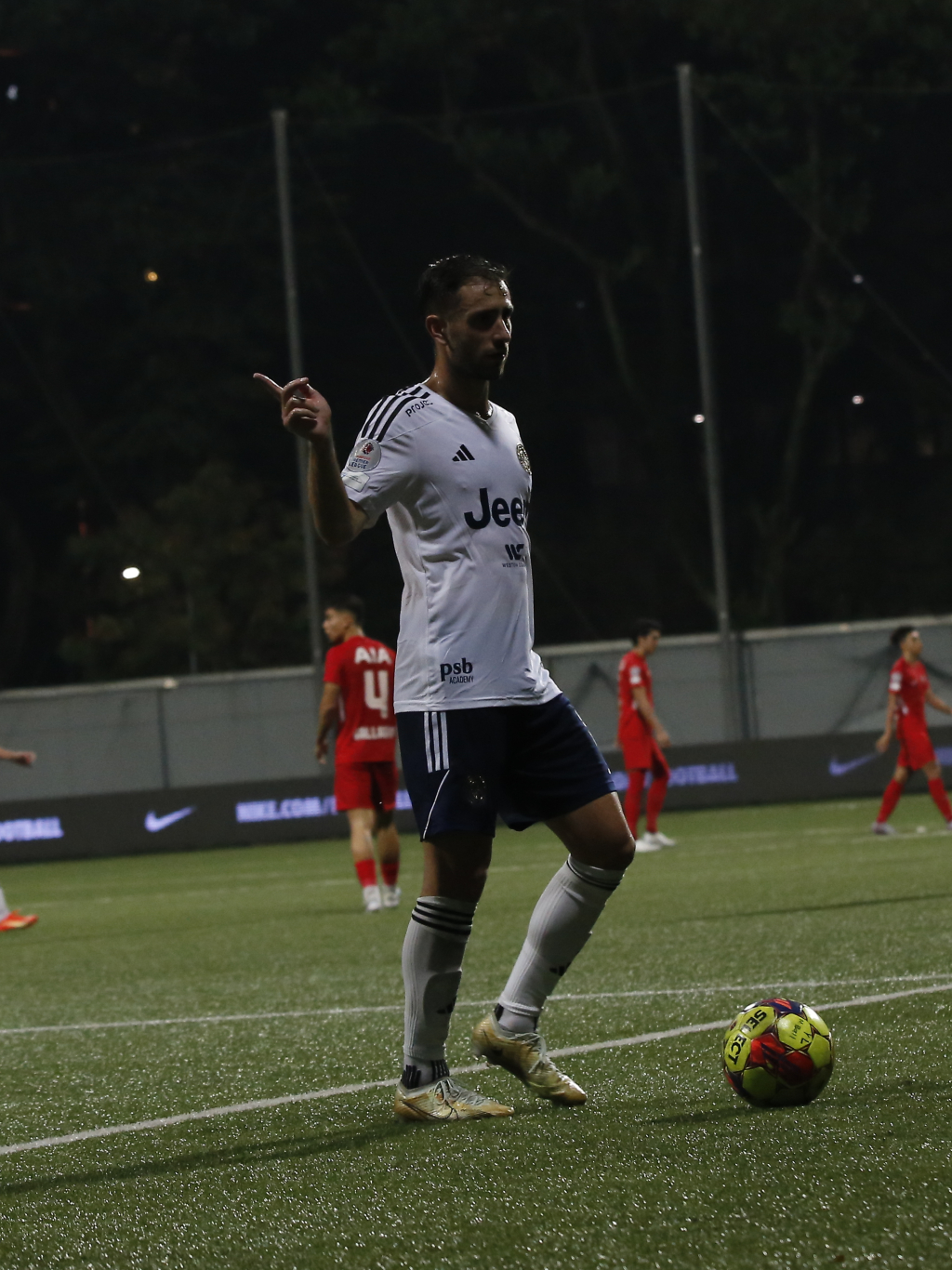
- Kozar with Balestier Khalsa in 2023

Personal information
- Date of birth: 7 April 1995 (age 31)
- Height: 1.75 m (5 ft 9 in)
- Position: Midfielder

Team information
- Current team: Mura
- Number: 14

Youth career
- –2013: Mura 05

Senior career*
Years	Team	Apps	(Gls)
2012–2013	Mura 05	3	(0)
2013–2016	Aluminij	24	(3)
2016–2023	Mura	152	(21)
2023–2025	Balestier Khalsa	52	(7)
2025	Sloga Doboj	10	(0)
2026	Enosis Neon Paralimni	12	(1)
2026–	Mura	0	(0)
- * Club domestic league appearances and goals as of 7 July 2026

Alen Kozar (born 7 April 1995) is a Slovenian professional footballer who plays as a midfielder for Slovenian PrvaLiga club Mura.

== Career statistics ==
=== Club ===
As of 24 July 2024

Appearances and goals by club, season and competition
Club	Season	League			National cup (Note: Includes Slovenian Cup, Singapore Cup)		Continental		Total	
Club	Season	Division	Apps	Goals	Apps	Goals	Apps	Goals	Apps	Goals
Mura 05	2011–12	Slovenian PrvaLiga	1	0	—		—		1	0
Mura 05	2012–13	Slovenian PrvaLiga	2	0	0	0	1 (Note: Appearances in UEFA Europa League)	0	3	0
Mura 05	Total		3	0	0	0	1	0	4	0
Aluminij	2013–14	Slovenian Second League	8	0	0	0	—		8	0
Aluminij	2014–15	Slovenian Second League	6	1	0	0	—		6	1
Aluminij	2015–16	Slovenian Second League	10	2	—		—		10	2
Aluminij	Total		24	3	0	0	0	0	24	3
Mura	2015–16	Slovenian Third League	12	6	0	0	—		12	6
Mura	2016–17	Slovenian Third League	23	5	—		—		23	5
Mura	2017–18	Slovenian Second League	27	7	4	0	—		31	7
Mura	2018–19	Slovenian PrvaLiga	31	2	6	0	—		37	2
Mura	2019–20	Slovenian PrvaLiga	10	0	0	0	2	0	12	0
Mura	2020–21	Slovenian PrvaLiga	14	1	0	0	3	1	17	2
Mura	2021–22	Slovenian PrvaLiga	24	0	1	1	11 (Note: Two appearances in UEFA Champions League, four appearances in UEFA Europa League, five appearances in UEFA Europa Conference League)	0	36	1
Mura	2022–23	Slovenian PrvaLiga	11	0	1	0	0	0	12	0
Mura	Total		152	21	12	1	16	1	180	23
Balestier Khalsa	2023	Singapore Premier League	22	2	2	2	—		24	4
Balestier Khalsa	2024–25	Singapore Premier League	9	2	0	0	—		9	2
Balestier Khalsa	Total		31	4	2	2	0	0	33	6
Career total			210	28	14	3	17	1	241	32
