= Hồ Tùng Hân =

Vietnamese footballer (born 2003)

Personal information
- Full name: Hồ Tùng Hân
- Date of birth: 5 October 2003 (age 23)
- Place of birth: Đà Nẵng, Vietnam
- Height: 1.78 m (5 ft 10 in)
- Position: Goalkeeper

Team information
- Current team: Balestier Khalsa (on loan from SHB Đà Nẵng)
- Number: 43

Youth career
- –2024: SHB Đà Nẵng

Senior career*
Years	Team	Apps	(Gls)
2022–	SHB Đà Nẵng B	21	(0)
2024–	SHB Đà Nẵng	0	(0)
2025	→ Balestier Khalsa (loan)	1	(0)

International career
2022	Vietnam U20	2	(0)
- * Club domestic league appearances and goals as of 7 March 2025

Hồ Tùng Hân (born 10 May 2003) is a Vietnamese professional footballer who plays as a goalkeeper for SHB Đà Nẵng.

== Club career ==
A youth product of SHB Đà Nẵng, Tùng Hân was promoted in the first team in the 2024–25 season. In October 2024, he left the team for a trial at Singaporean side Balestier Khalsa. In January 2025, Tùng Hân joined Balestier Khalsa on a five-month loan deal.

On 2 March 2025, Tùng Hân made his professional debut in Balestier Khalsa's Singapore Cup game against BG Pathum United. Despite saving a penalty during the game, he couldn't prevent his team from a 1–2 defeat. Four days later, Tùng Hân made his first appearance in the Singapore Premier League in his team's 4–3 win against Geylang International.

== International career ==
In 2022, Tùng Hân featured in Vietnam U19 squad for the AFF U-19 Championship, being the second choice goalkeeper behind Cao Văn Bình. Tùng Hân appeared in one game during the tournament as Vietnam finished in the third place.

In March 2025, Tùng Hân was called up by the Vietnam U22 squad to prepare for the team 2025 CFA Team China Cup held in Yancheng.

== Honours ==
Vietnam U19

- AFF U-19 Youth Championship: Third place: 2022
- International Thanh Niên Newspaper Cup: 2022
