= Darren Teh =

Singaporean association football player

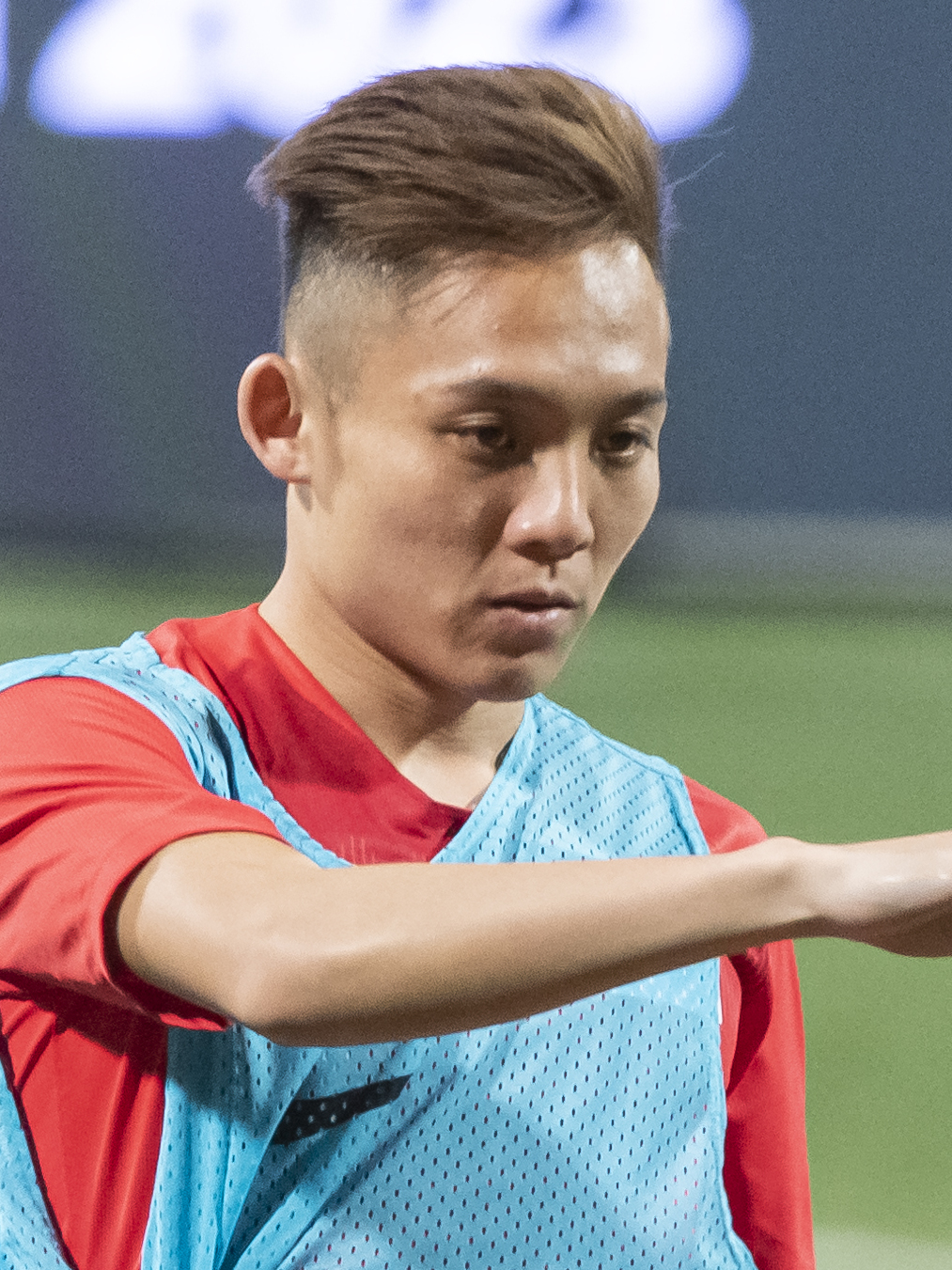
- Darren warming up for Singapore in 2019

Personal information
- Full name: Darren Teh
- Date of birth: 19 August 1996 (age 30)
- Place of birth: Singapore
- Height: 1.73 m (5 ft 8 in)
- Position: Full-back

Team information
- Current team: Geylang International
- Number: 2

Youth career
- Hougang United
- 2013–2016: Young Lions
- 2017: Geylang International

Senior career*
| Years | Team | Apps | (Gls) |
| 2017–2021 | Geylang International | 94 | (2) |
| 2022–2026 | Balestier Khalsa | 120 | (0) |
| 2026– | Geylang International | 6 | (0) |

International career^{‡}
| 2019– | Singapore | 4 | (0) |
- * Club domestic league appearances and goals as of 15 May 2026 ‡ National team caps and goals as of 11 October 2019

Darren Teh is a Singaporean professional footballer who plays as a full-back for Singapore Premier League club Geylang International and the Singapore national team.

== Club career ==
=== Geylang International ===
Darren signed with Geylang International in 2017.

Although the Eagles finished fourth in the 2017 S.League, they only retained 3 players for the 2018 season, of which Darren is one of them.

His contract was extended for the 2019 season after another good performance in 2018. His current salary is rumoured to be USD 1000 fortnightly.

=== Balestier Khalsa ===
On 3 November 2021, Darren signed for Singapore Premier League side Balestier Khalsa.

=== Return to Geylang International ===
In July 2026, Darren returned to his former club Geylang International.

== International career ==
He was called up to the Singapore U23 team against Indonesia in March 2018 but didn't play in the match. He played in the match against Myanmar U23 in the tune up to the Asian Games.

Darren was first called up to the Singapore national team in 2019, for the 2022 FIFA World Cup qualification against Yemen and Palestine on 5 September and 10 September respectively. He made his debut against Jordan, replacing Zulfahmi Arifin in the 46th minute. Darren made his first international start against Saudi Arabia for the FIFA World Cup qualifiers on 11 October 2019.

In November 2026, Darren earned a first international call-up for the first time in seven years for a friendly match against Paraguay and Brazil where he went on to featured against the latter coming on as a substitution.

== Career statistics ==
=== Club ===
As of 15 May 2026.

| Club | Season | S.League | | Singapore Cup | | Singapore League Cup | | Asia | | Total | |
| Club | Season | Apps | Goals | Apps | Goals | Apps | Goals | Apps | Goals | Apps | Goals |
|---|---|---|---|---|---|---|---|---|---|---|---|
| Geylang International | 2017 | 12 | 0 | 0 | 0 | 0 | 0 | 0 | 0 | 12 | 0 |
| Geylang International | 2018 | 24 | 1 | 2 | 0 | 0 | 0 | 0 | 0 | 26 | 1 |
| Geylang International | 2019 | 23 | 0 | 6 | 0 | 0 | 0 | 0 | 0 | 29 | 0 |
| Geylang International | 2020 | 14 | 1 | 0 | 0 | 0 | 0 | 0 | 0 | 14 | 1 |
| Geylang International | 2021 | 13 | 0 | 0 | 0 | 0 | 0 | 0 | 0 | 13 | 0 |
| Geylang International | Total | 86 | 2 | 8 | 0 | 0 | 0 | 0 | 0 | 94 | 2 |
| Balestier Khalsa | 2022 | 26 | 0 | 6 | 0 | 0 | 0 | 0 | 0 | 32 | 0 |
| Balestier Khalsa | 2023 | 24 | 0 | 3 | 0 | 0 | 0 | 0 | 0 | 27 | 0 |
| Balestier Khalsa | 2024–25 | 31 | 0 | 4 | 0 | 0 | 0 | 0 | 0 | 35 | 0 |
| Balestier Khalsa | 2025–26 | 20 | 0 | 6 | 0 | 0 | 0 | 0 | 0 | 26 | 0 |
| Balestier Khalsa | Total | 101 | 0 | 19 | 0 | 0 | 0 | 0 | 0 | 120 | 0 |
| Geylang International | 2026–27 | 6 | 0 | 0 | 0 | 0 | 0 | 0 | 0 | 6 | 0 |
| Geylang International | Total | 6 | 0 | 0 | 0 | 0 | 0 | 0 | 0 | 6 | 0 |
| Career total | | 193 | 2 | 27 | 0 | 0 | 0 | 0 | 0 | 220 | 2 |

=== International ===
==== Senior ====
| No | Date | Venue | Opponent | Result | Competition |
|---|---|---|---|---|---|
| 1 | 5 October 2019 | Amman International Stadium, Amman, Jordan | Jordan | 0-0 (draw) | Friendly |
| 2 | 10 October 2019 | King Abdullah Sport City Stadium, Buraidah, Saudi Arabia | Saudi Arabia | 0-3 (lost) | 2022 FIFA World Cup qualification – AFC second round |

==== U22 ====
| No | Date | Venue | Opponent | Result | Competition |
|---|---|---|---|---|---|
| 1 | 9 July 2017 | Choa Chu Kang Stadium, Singapore | India | 0-1 (lost) | Friendly |
| 2 | 12 July 2017 | Choa Chu Kang Stadium, Singapore | India | 1-0 (won) | Friendly |
| 3 | 20 June 2018 | Jalan Besar Stadium, Singapore | Myanmar | 0–2 (lost) | Friendly |
