= Peter de Roo =

Dutch footballer and coach (born 1970)

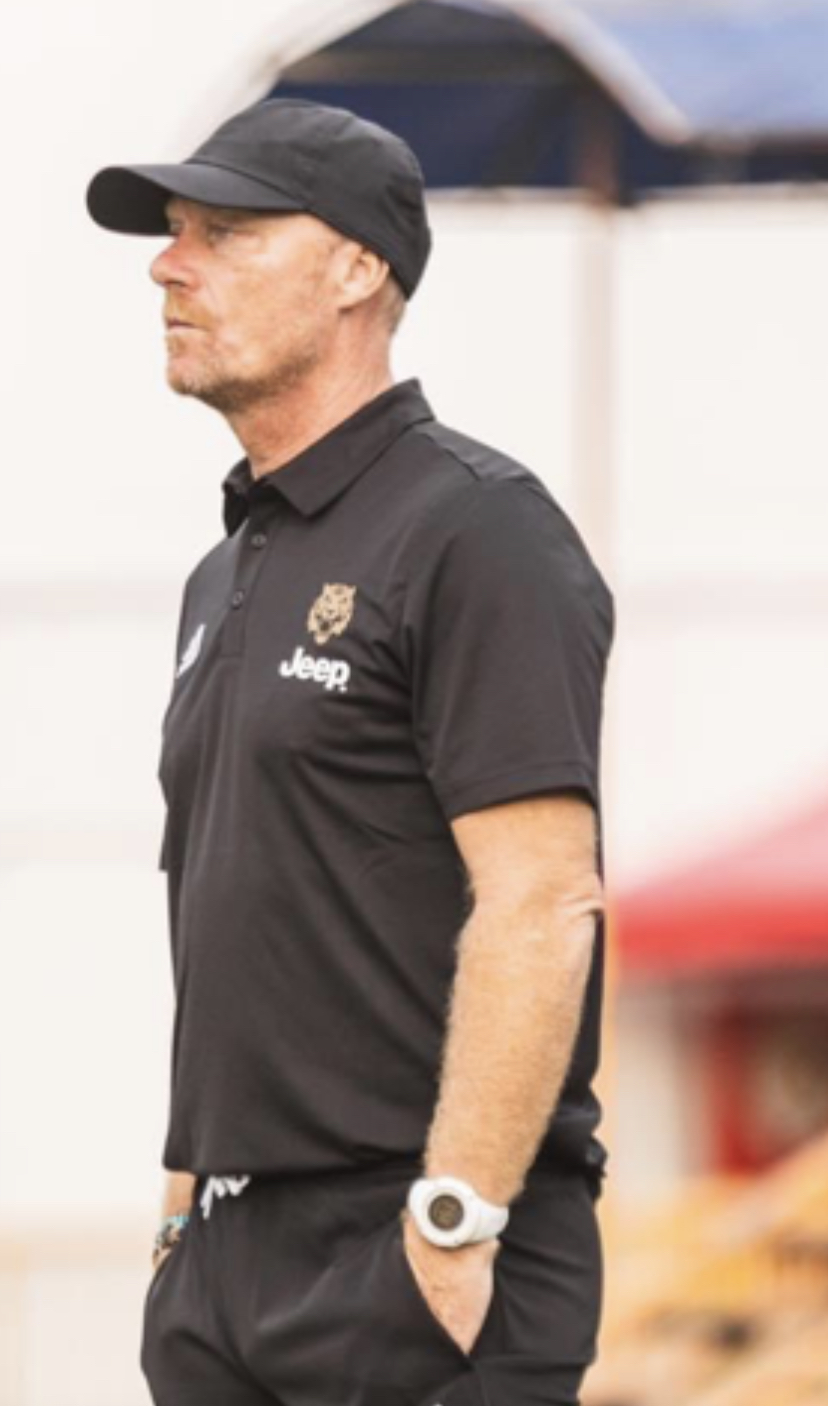
- Peter de Roo in charge of Balestier Khalsa

Personal information
- Full name: Peter de Roo
- Date of birth: 16 February 1970 (age 56)
- Place of birth: Amsterdam, Netherlands
- Position: Midfielder

Youth career
- 1982–1989: VV Drachten

Senior career*
Years	Team	Apps	(Gls)
1989–1996	BV Veendam		
1996–2002	SC Cambuur		

Managerial career
- 2022–2025: Balestier Khalsa
- 2025: Persis Solo
- * Club domestic league appearances and goals

Peter de Roo (born 16 February 1970) is a Dutch professional football coach and former player.

De Roo played professional football for twelve years, mainly for BV Veendam and SC Cambuur from 1996 to 2002.

== Managerial career ==
After his playing career, de Roo became a coach and technical director in Dutch professional football at SC Cambuur. In 2009, de Roo further expanded on his football experiences by taking an offer to work in Australia as a technical director at Football Queensland and head coach of the Queensland Academy of Sport (QAS NTC).

From 2012 to 2017, he was the Technical Director/Head Coach with the FFA Centre of Excellence (formerly known as the Australian Institute of Sport Football Program).

In September 2017, de Roo was appointed by the Football Association of Malaysia as their new Technical Director. de Roo resigned from his post as Technical Director in 2020.

On 27 June 2025, de Roo was appointed as the new head coach of Indonesia club Persis Solo.

== Managerial statistics ==
As of 3 November 2025

Managerial record by team and tenure
Team	Nat.	From	To	Record					Ref.
Team	Nat.	From	To	G	W	D	L	Win %	Ref.
Balestier Khalsa	(Singapore)	1 September 2022	30 June 2025	75	31	8	36	41.33	
Persis Solo	(Indonesia)	1 July 2025	3 November 2025	10	1	2	7	10.00	
Career Total				85	32	10	43	37.65	
