= Balestier Khalsa FC =

Singaporean association football club

Balestier Khalsa
- Full name: Balestier Khalsa Football Club
- Nickname: Hala Tigers
- Short name: BAL
- Founded: 1898; 128 years ago as Fathul Karib; 1975; 51 years ago as Balestier United Recreation Club; 1996; 30 years ago as Balestier Central; 2002; 24 years ago as Balestier Khalsa
- Ground: Bishan Stadium
- Capacity: 10,000
- Chairman: Thavaneson Selvaratnam
- Head coach: Marko Kraljević
- League: Singapore Premier League
- 2025–26: Singapore Premier League, 4th of 8
Home colours	Away colours

Balestier Khalsa Football Club is a professional football club based in Toa Payoh, Singapore, that competes in the Singapore Premier League. Founded in 1898, the club is considered as the oldest football club in the country. The club has won the Singapore Cup, Singapore League Cup and the Singapore FA Cup once each.

Balestier Khalsa is the fourth oldest club in the Asia continent and is the oldest club in the Southeast Asia region.

== History ==
=== Founding and early years (1898–1997) ===
Tracing their origins all the way back to 1898, the club was formed as Fathul Kharib Football Club on 10 October 1898 and based in Farrer Park. Fathul Kharib was founded by Syed Gulab Shah.

The club provided nine players to the Singapore national team which competed in the 1958 Asian Games in Japan, losing 2–1 to both continental heavyweights South Korea and Israel.

The side was renamed Balestier United Recreation Club in 1975, the outcome of the league system in Singapore being restructured by the Football Association of Singapore. Balestier United Recreation Club joined the inaugural National Football League in 1975, in Division 2.

The club played in the Singapore Premier League (the forerunner to the S.League) from 1988 to 1995. It became the first club in Singapore to bring in foreign players when they signed two Yugoslavian players, Joško Španjić and Boris Lucic, for the 1989 season. Balestier United are currently still active in local football, competing in the National Football League Division 1. Former Balestier Khalsa players such as Ruhaizad Ismail, Daniel Ong and Syafiq Zainal all played for the team as well.

The club won the Singapore FA Cup twice, in 1958 and 1992.

=== S.League era as Balestier Central (1996–2002) ===
With the introduction of the S.League in 1996 and entities reintroduced as a professional football teams, Balestier United Recreational Club became a founder member of the S.League and competed under a new flagship name as Balestier Central.

=== Creating the foundation (2003–2012) ===
==== Merger with Clementi Khalsa and renaming as Balestier Khalsa ====
Clementi Khalsa crest

In 2002, Balestier Central took another turn as they merged with Clementi Khalsa at the end of the 2002 S.League season. Clementi Khalsa was formed as a club to represent Singapore's Sikh community and joined the S.League in 1999. Before the merger with Balestier Central, the club was based in the Clementi area of Singapore and played its home games at the Clementi Stadium.

On 10 August 2012, Balestier Khalsa won the first Singapore League Cup Plate Final as the team defeated Young Lions at Jalan Besar Stadium.

=== Achieving more silverware and AFC Cup debut (2013–2017) ===
In 2013, head coach Darren Stewart signed Nigerian Obadin Aikhena, South Korean Jung Hee-bong and several players from his former team, Gombak United, and formed a strong foundation of the team, including foreign players Kim Min-ho and Park Kang-jin, together with Singapore national team player Qiu Li, and proved to be a success. On 14 September 2013, the Tigers scored a huge 4–0 win over DPMM in the 2013 Singapore League Cup Final and clinched their first ever silverware. Captain Paul Cunningham and the team won the trophy and took 3rd place in the 2013 Singapore Cup.

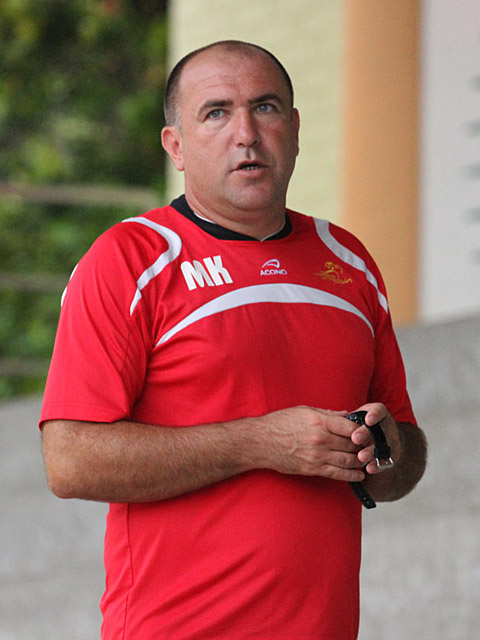
Marko Kraljević guided the club to their first ever AFC Cup debut in 2015, and is the club's longest serving manager, from 2014 to 2021.

Balestier Khalsa signed former U-21 Croatian international Goran Ljubojević on 11 February 2014 as their first ever marquee signing, as well as Emir Lotinac of Serbia from Novi Pazar. The Tigers won their first Singapore Cup on 7 November 2014, beating Home United 3–1, with Goran, Kim and Park scoring the goals. With this win they qualified for the 2015 AFC Cup.

==== AFC Cup debut ====
The Tigers made their 2015 AFC Cup group stage debut on 24 February 2015, losing 0–3 to Hong Kong Premier League champions Kitchee at the Mong Kok Stadium. On 10 March 2015, they almost held eventual Malaysia Super League champions Johor Darul Ta'zim to a goalless draw, but the visitors scored in stoppage time at 90+3 minutes. Balestier Khalsa finally got their historic first win in the following week, with Jonathan Xu scoring his and Tiger's maiden AFC Cup goal, and Miroslav Krištić adding another, to beat East Bengal from India 2–1. Balestier Khalsa finished at the bottom of the table with three points.

Balestier Khalsa finished as runner-up in the 2015 Singapore Charity Shield to Warriors. On 10 July 2015, Balestier Khalsa lost narrowly, 2–1, against Albirex Niigata (S) to finish runner-up in the 2015 Singapore League Cup.

For the 2016 season, Balestier Khalsa qualified for 2016 AFC Cup as Singapore's second best local team and got their first away goals/points in the AFC Cup, as they held Maldives Dhivehi Premier League champions, New Radiant 2–2 at Malé. They continue to improve their run in the competition, winning against Kitchee & New Radiant 1–0 and 3–0 at home. However, that was not enough for them to secure to the knockout stage, as they finished in 3rd place with 7 points, 3 points away from 2nd place, Kaya. Balestier Khalsa finished 4th in the Singapore Cup after losing to Ceres-La Salle in the third place playoff.

==== Tight budget ====
In 2017, due to the club's tight budget, Balestier Khalsa signed three Myanmar national team players, Aung Kyaw Naing, Kyaw Zayar Win, Nanda Lin Kyaw Chit, from Nay Pyi Taw, Ayeyawady United and Yadanabon respectively. Balestier Khalsa finished in seventh position in the 2017 season.

=== Singapore Premier League era (2018–present) ===
In 2018, Balestier Khalsa signed four foreigners, with Vedran Mesec, Keegan Linderboom and Dušan Marinković joining the Tigers for the upcoming newly revamped league.

On 22 October 2021, Akbar Nawas was announced as the head coach of Balestier Khalsa, succeeding Marko Kraljević, who left a week prior. Before this, Nawas led the 2nd division I-League club, Chennai City to become champions of the league in the 2018–19 I-League with current player Iqbal Hussain. According to a club statement, Nawas signed a two-year contract worth more than S$170,000. However, less than a year into the contract, he tendered his resignation to join Thai League 2 side, Udon Thani, less than a week after a record 6–1 win against Hougang United.

On 27 August 2022, the Tigers recruited former Football Association of Malaysia Technical Director Peter de Roo as an interim coach until the end of the 2022 season. On 30 November 2022, he was appointed to a permanent role as head coach of Balestier Khalsa.

De Roo started off the 2023 season making slight changes to his squad, signing Alen Kozar from NŠ Mura and Masahiro Sugita from Albirex Niigata Singapore. Under his reign, Balestier Khalsa won three consecutive matches against Tanjong Pagar United, Tampines Rovers and Brunei DPMM, before losing to Albirex Niigata (S) 6–2. The Tigers had another fine run of form, winning four consecutive matches until Hougang United ended the streak on 21 July 2023.

In the 2024–25 Singapore Premier League season, the Tigers signed Japanese players Kodai Tanaka and Riku Fukashiro, while Tunisian Ismaïl Sassi joined the club from AS Marsa. The club participated in the 2024 Selangor Asia Challenge pre-season tournament on 26 and 28 April 2024 respectively.

In March 2025, Richard Harcus joined the club (former director of football at Angkor City) as head of international football operations, to help drive the club forward internationally, with strategic, commercial and educational development.

== Kit suppliers and shirt sponsors ==
For much of Balestier Khalsa's history, their kit provider has been Umbro since their formation with Clementi Khalsa and Balestier Central. Since 2017, a main sponsor has been Civic as well. In 2018, Balestier Khalsa signed a deal with Thailand sportswear Mawin, and then with Italian sportswear brand Lotto in 2019. In 2020, Balestier Khalsa signed a deal with German sportswear Adidas to manufacture their kits alongside Weston Corp as their kit sponsors to date.

On 29 March 2018, Balestier Khalsa launched their inaugural 2018 Singapore Premier League football campaign with the signing of a landmark sponsorship deal with sport utility vehicle brand Jeep. The one-year deal, worth $100,000, is the club's biggest sponsorship contract in its history. On 28 February 2019, Balestier Khalsa extended their contract with Jeep for another year. Italian giants Juventus, who were also sponsored by Jeep, made a collaboration during their pre-season visit to Singapore.

Period	Kit manufacturer	Main sponsors
2002–2017	(England) Umbro	(Singapore) Civic
2018	(Thailand) Mawin	(United States) Jeep (Singapore) Weston Corp
2019	(Italy) Lotto	(United States) Jeep (Singapore) Weston Corp
2020–2025	(Germany) Adidas	(United States) Jeep (Singapore) Weston Corp
2025–2026	(Germany) Adidas	(Singapore) Komoco
2025–present	(Spain) Kelme	(Singapore) Emerald Law LLC

== Stadium ==
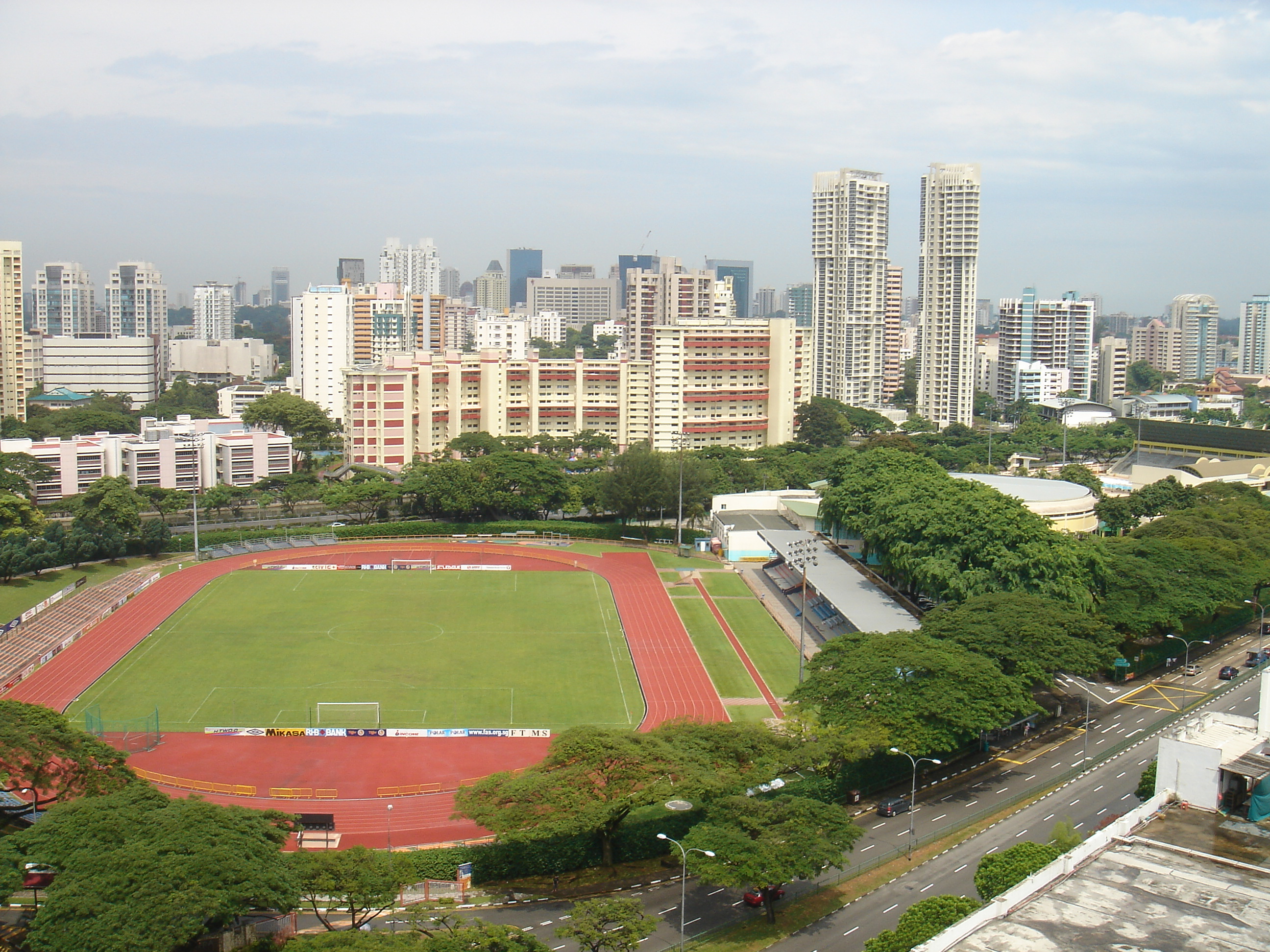
Home of Balestier Khalsa, Toa Payoh Stadium

Balestier Khalsa played their home games at the Toa Payoh Stadium. The stadium held up to 3,800 spectators. Since the 2023 Singapore Premier League season, Balestier Khalsa has shared the Bishan Stadium with Lion City Sailors. The old stadium was demolished in October 2023, to make way for a new regional sport centre.

== Affiliated clubs ==
- (Indonesia) Nusantara United (2024–present)

On 14 June 2024, Balestier Khalsa announced Indonesian Liga 2 club Nusantara United as their official partner.

- (Australia) Western United (2024–2025)

On 28 August 2024, Balestier Khalsa signed a memorandum of understanding (MOU) with A-League club Western United.

== Players ==
As of 10 September 2026

=== First team squad ===
Note: Flags indicate national team as defined under FIFA eligibility rules; some limited exceptions apply. Players may hold more than one non-FIFA nationality.

No.	Pos.	Nation	Player
2	MF	SGP	Azim Akbar
3	DF	SGP	Tajeli Salamat (captain)
4	DF	SGP	Shakir Hamzah
5	DF	SGP	Danial Scott Crichton
7	MF	SGP	Daniel Goh
10	MF	CRO	Marin Kuzminski
12	MF	SGP	Woo Chun Wei
14	MF	JPN	Hiro Mizuguchi
15	DF	JPN	Jun Kobayashi
17	FW	CRO	Tin Matić
18	MF	JPN	Yushin Otake
19	FW	SGP	Zikos Chua
20	DF	SGP	Fudhil I'yadh
21	GK	SGP	Hafiz Ahmad

No.	Pos.	Nation	Player
22	FW	CRO	Jakov Katuša
23	DF	SGP	Bill Mamadou
24	MF	SGP	Ilyasin Zayan
25	DF	SGP	Syafi Hilman
26	DF	SGP	Levi Alfa
27	MF	SGP	Firdaus Roslan
28	DF	SGP	Loukas Ng
30	MF	SGP	Ifat Sha'aban
32	FW	SGP	Timothy Cheng
33	MF	SGP	Ethan Pinto
71	GK	CRO	Mario Mustapić
77	FW	SGP	Zamani Zamri

=== Reserve League (SPL2) squad ===
Note: Flags indicate national team as defined under FIFA eligibility rules; some limited exceptions apply. Players may hold more than one non-FIFA nationality.

No.	Pos.	Nation	Player
53	DF	SGP	Caele Kai ^{U21}
54	DF	SGP	Aaryan Fikri
55	MF	SGP	Danie Hafiy
63	DF	SGP	Ikmal Hazlan
65	DF	SGP	Irfan Mika'il
67	MF	SGP	Irfan Iskandar
68	MF	SGP	Adam Faisal

No.	Pos.	Nation	Player
70	MF	SGP	Aqil Dany
73	GK	SGP	Efan Qiszman
80	GK	SGP	Dany Irfan
81	DF	SGP	Shaddiq Mansor
82	DF	SGP	Ramadhan Putera

=== On loan ===
Note: Flags indicate national team as defined under FIFA eligibility rules; some limited exceptions apply. Players may hold more than one non-FIFA nationality.

No.	Pos.	Nation	Player
66	GK	SGP	Ryan Praveen

== Management and staff ==
Position	Name
Chairman	(Singapore) S. Thavaneson
General manager	(Singapore) Tim Nee Cheng
Head coach	(Croatia) Marko Kraljević
Assistant coach	(Malaysia) Budiyanto Mat Nanto
Assistant coach	-
Goalkeeping coach	-
Team Analyst	-
Fitness coach	(Singapore) Donald Wan
Physiotherapist	-
Kitman	-

== Honours ==
Type	Competition	Titles	Seasons
Cup	**Singapore Cup**	1	2014
Cup	Singapore League Cup	1	2013
Cup	Singapore League Cup Plate	1	2012
Cup	Singapore FA Cup	1	2012
Cup	President's Cup	1	1992
Cup	FAS Challenge Cup	1	1958
Others	Prime League	2	2012, 2013

Competitions in bold are currently active.

== Award winners ==
=== Domestic ===
- **League Player of the Year**
  - (Singapore) Nazri Nasir (1997)
- **League Young Player of the Year**
  - (Cameroon) Kengne Ludovick (2006)
  - (Singapore) Hazzuwan Halim (2017)
- **League Coach of the Year**
  - (Croatia) Marko Kraljević (2014)
- **League Top Scorer**
  - (Croatia) Goran Paulić (1997)
- **League Goal of the Year**
  - (Singapore) Huzaifah Aziz against Young Lions on 20 September 2017
- **League Team of the Year**
  - (Croatia) Kristijan Krajček (2020)
  - (Croatia) Šime Žužul (2021)
  - (Japan) Ryoya Taniguchi (2023)

== Records and statistics ==
As of 21 November 2026.

=== Top 10 all-time appearances ===
Rank	Player	Years	Club appearances
1	(Singapore) Zaiful Nizam	2013–2021	231
2	(Singapore) Poh Yi Feng	2008–2015	216
3	(Singapore) Ahmad Syahir	2013–2021	168
4	(Singapore) Hazzuwan Halim	2014–2021	157
5	(Singapore) Fadli Kamis	2016–2021	150
6	(Singapore) Zulkiffli Hassim	2012–2016	140
6	(Singapore) Ignatius Ang	2015, 2022–2026	140
8	(New Zealand) Paul Cunningham	2010–2014	130
9	(Singapore) Darren Teh	2022–2026	120
10	(Singapore) Nurullah Hussein	2014–2019	107

=== Top 10 all-time scorers ===
Rank	Player	Club appearances	Total goals
1	(Japan) Shuhei Hoshino	92	43
2	(Japan) Ryoya Taniguchi	60	36
3	(Singapore) Hazzuwan Halim	157	32
4	(Croatia) Šime Žužul	54	31
5	(Japan) Kodai Tanaka	36	30
6	(Croatia) Miroslav Krištić	67	29
7	(Croatia) Goran Ljubojević	37	27
8	**(Singapore) Daniel Goh**	102	26
9	(South Korea) Kim Min-ho	83	25
10	(Cameroon) Ludovick Takam	30	24

- Biggest win: 7–1 vs Sengkang Punggol (on 1 July 2006)
- Heaviest defeat: 8–1 vs Tampines Rovers (on 11 November 2022)
- Youngest goal scorer: Sameer Alassane, 18 years 5 months 2 days old (on 26 May 2016 vs Home United)
- Oldest goal scorer: Madhu Mohana, 34 years 7 months 13 days (on 19 October 2025 vs Tampines Rovers)
- Youngest ever player: Aqil Yazid, 17 years 2 months 5 days (on 14 March 2021 vs Young Lions)
- Oldest ever player: Abdil Qaiyyim, 36 years 11 days old (on 25 May 2025 vs Albirex Niigata (S))

== Club captains ==
Year	Captain
1996–2003	(Singapore) TBC
2004	(Singapore) Roniwardi Mamsa
2005–2006	(Japan) Akihiro Nakamura
2007–2010	(Singapore) TBC
2011–2014	(New Zealand) Paul Cunningham
2015–2020	(Singapore) Zaiful Nizam
2021	(Singapore) Fadli Kamis
2022–2023	(Singapore) Ho Wai Loon
2024–2025	**(Slovenia)** Alen Kozar
2025–2026	(Singapore) Madhu Mohana
2026–present	(Singapore) Tajeli Salamat

== Notable players ==
=== International capped players ===
**AFC****/OFC**: (American Samoa) Seth Galloway; (Australia) Darren Stewart; (India) Abneet Bharti; (Japan) Kuraba Kondo; (Japan) Masahiro Sugita; (Myanmar) Aung Kyaw Naing; (Myanmar) Kyaw Zayar Win; (Myanmar) Nanda Lin Kyaw Chit; (New Zealand) Andrew Durante; (South Korea) Lee Ho-sung; (South Korea) Jang Jo-yoon; (Vietnam) Hồ Tùng Hân	**CAF**: (Liberia) Nathaniel Klay Naplah	**UEFA**: (Croatia) Goran Ljubojević; (Croatia) Tin Matić; (Croatia) Marin Kuzminski; (Germany) Jörg Steinebrunner; (Montenegro) Zdravko Dragićević	**CONMEBOL/** **CONCACAF** – NIL –

== Managerial history ==
The following table lists the club's head coaches since the merger with Clementi Khalsa in 2003.

Manager	Period	Achievements
(Singapore) Abdullah Noor	January 2003 – 8 April 2003	
(South Korea) Jang Jung	10 April 2003 – 25 June 2004	
(Singapore) Abdul Karim Razzak	26 June 2004 – 30 September 2004	
(Singapore) Swandi Ahmad	6 February 2005 – 27 February 2005	
(Singapore) Abdullah Noor (2)	2 March 2005 – 4 May 2005	
(Singapore) Abdul Karim Razzak (2)	12 May 2005 – 1 June 2005	
(Singapore) Mohammed Zainudeen	1 June 2005 – 30 June 2005	
(Singapore) Abdul Karim Razzak (3)	30 June 2005 – 31 December 2007	
(Singapore) Nasaruddin Jalil	1 January 2008 – 31 December 2010	
(Singapore) Salim Moin	1 January 2011 – 31 December 2011	
(Australia) Darren Stewart	1 January 2012 – 31 December 2013	2012 Singapore League Cup 2013 Singapore League Cup
(Croatia) Marko Kraljević	1 January 2014 – 25 January 2019	2014 Singapore Cup
(Singapore) Khidhir Khamis	4 February 2019 – 24 September 2019	
(Croatia) Marko Kraljević (2)	24 September 2019 – 31 December 2021	
(Singapore) Akbar Nawas	1 January 2022 – 31 August 2022	
(Netherlands) Peter de Roo	1 September 2022 – 26 May 2025	
(Croatia) Marko Kraljevic (3)	30 June 2025 – present	

== Season by season record ==
=== As Balestier Central/ Balestier Khalsa ===
Season	League	Pos.	P	W	D	L	GS	GA	Pts	Singapore Cup	League Cup
As Balestier Central
1996-1	S.League	**3rd***	14	7	3	4	22	18	24		
1996-2	S.League	**3rd***	14	7	3	4	25	19	24		
1997	S.League	**4th**	16	8	4	4	43	26	28		
1998	S.League	**4th**	20	9	4	7	47	43	31	Group stage	
1999	S.League	**7th**	22	6	8	8	25	27	26	Semi-final	
2000	S.League	**12th**	22	3	5	14	16	42	14	Round of 16	
2001	S.League	**7th**	33	8	11	14	43	57	35	Group stage	
2002	S.League	**11th**	33	6	5	22	50	103	23	Group stage	
As Balestier Khalsa
2003	S.League	**11th**	33	5	2–6	20	37	76	25	Quarter-final	
2004	S.League	**8th**	27	6	19	22	36	73	20	Quarter-final	
2005	S.League	**7th**	27	10	6	11	45	52	36	Preliminary round	
2006	S.League	**7th**	30	10	7	13	50	61	37	Semi-final	
2007	S.League	**9th**	33	7	8	18	44	63	29	Quarter-final	Quarter-final
2008	S.League	**12th**	33	3	8	22	26	60	17	Round of 16	Third place
2009	S.League	**11th**	30	4	6	20	22	58	18	Round of 16	Group stage
2010	S.League	**8th**	33	10	7	16	26	40	37	Quarter-final	Preliminary stage
2011	S.League	**10th**	33	7	5	21	28	63	26	Round of 16	Preliminary stage
2012	S.League	**6th**	24	11	6	7	23	20	39	Round of 16	Plate winners
2013	S.League	**4th**	27	12	7	8	38	28	43	Third place	**Winners**
2014	S.League	**6th**	27	11	7	9	46	34	40	**Winners**	Plate runners-up
2015	S.League	**4th**	27	12	8	7	39	35	44	Quarter-final	Runners-up
2016	S.League	**8th**	24	4	7	13	23	42	19	Semi-final	Group stage
2017	S.League	**7th**	24	5	4	15	17	33	19	Preliminary round	Group stage
2018	Singapore Premier League	**6th**	24	7	6	11	25	36	27	Third place	
2019	Singapore Premier League	**9th**	24	4	5	15	37	58	17	Group stage	
2020	Singapore Premier League	**5th**	14	5	4	5	22	28	19		
2021	Singapore Premier League	**7th**	21	5	4	12	31	52	19		
2022	Singapore Premier League	**7th**	28	7	3	18	45	78	24	Semi-finals	
2023	Singapore Premier League	**4th**	24	12	0	12	60	71	36	Group stage	
2024–25	Singapore Premier League	**4th**	32	14	6	12	84	80	48	Group stage	
2025–26	Singapore Premier League	**4th**	21	11	2	8	44	46	35	Semi-finals	

=== As Clementi Khalsa ===
Season	League	Pos.	P	W	D	L	GS	GA	Pts	Singapore Cup
1999	S.League	**11th**	22	3	6	13	29	55	**15**	Round of 16
2000	S.League	**8th**	22	5	10	7	33	46	**25**	Round of 16
2001	S.League	**9th**	33	7	9	17	43	76	**30**	Group stage
2002	S.League	**10th**	33	7	4	22	45	84	**25**	Group stage

- The 1996 season of the S.League was split into two series.
- 2003 saw the introduction of penalty shoot-outs if a match ended in a draw in regular time. Winners of penalty shoot-outs gained two points instead of one.

== Continental record ==
Season	Competition	Round	Club	Home
1992–93	Asian Cup Winners' Cup	First round	(Vietnam) Quảng Nam Đà Nẵng	Withdrew
2015	AFC Cup	Group F	(Hong Kong) Kitchee	1–2
2015	AFC Cup	Group F	(Malaysia) Johor Darul Ta'zim	0–1
2015	AFC Cup	Group F	(India) East Bengal	2–1
2016	AFC Cup	Group F	(Maldives) New Radiant	3–0
2016	AFC Cup	Group F	(Hong Kong) Kitchee	1–0
2016	AFC Cup	Group F	(Philippines) Kaya	0–3

== See also ==
- History of Singaporean Indians
- History of Indian influence on Southeast Asia
- Indian diaspora
- Indian Singaporeans
- Sikhism in Singapore
- Singapore Khalsa Association
- List of Indian organisations in Singapore
