= 2026–27 Hougang United FC season =

Hougang United
2026–27 season
- Chairman: Bill Ng
- Head coach: Akbar Nawas
- Stadium: Jalan Besar Stadium
- S.League: TBD
- Singapore Cup: TBD
- Top goalscorer: League: TBD; All: TBD
Home colours	Away colours

The 2026–27 season is Hougang United's 29th consecutive season in the top flight of Singapore football and in the Singapore Premier League (SPL) and the Singapore Cup.

The women team will participate in the Women's Premier League.

== Squad ==
=== Singapore Premier League ===
No.	Name	Nationality	Date of birth (age)	Previous club	Contract since	Contract end
Goalkeepers
13	Rauf Erwan	(Singapore)	25 April 2005 (age 21)	(Singapore) Young Lions	2025	2027
17	Takahiro Koga	(Japan)	11 March 1999 (age 27)	(Singapore) FC Jurong	2026	2028
24	Aizil Yazid (CT)	(Singapore)	24 December 2004 (age 21)	(Singapore) Young Lions	2023	2027
31	Ridhuan Barudin	(Singapore)	23 March 1987 (age 39)	(Singapore) Tampines Rovers	2025	2027
Defenders
3	Jordan Nicolas Vestering	(Singapore) (Netherlands)	25 September 2000 (age 26)	(Singapore) NFA U18	2018	2027
4	Washington Jaramillo	(Ecuador)	16 February 1999 (age 27)	(Ecuador) C.D. Olmedo (E2)	2025	2027
5	Koki Kawachi	(Japan)	10 May 2000 (age 26)	(Australia) Launceston City	2026	2027
7	Zulqarnaen Suzliman	(Singapore)	29 March 1998 (age 28)	(Singapore) Lion City Sailors	2026	2027
15	Miloš Drinčić	(Montenegro)	14 February 1999 (age 27)	(Montenegro) Budućnost Podgorica	2026	2027
18	Aqil Yazid	(Singapore)	9 January 2004 (age 22)	(Singapore) Young Lions	2023	2027
20	Syady Sufwan	(Singapore)	28 April 2002 (age 24)	(Singapore) Geylang International U21	2025	2027
29	Rauf Sanizal	(Singapore)	7 November 2006 (age 20)	(Singapore) Hougang United U21	2022	2027
32	Afzal Halim	(Singapore)	8 August 2005 (age 21)	(Singapore) Hougang United U21	2024	2027
33	Wong Ngang Haang	(Singapore)	3 March 2004 (age 22)	(Singapore) Balestier Khalsa	2026	2027
37	Darren Teo	(Singapore)	21 December 2003 (age 22)	(Singapore) Balestier Khalsa	2026	2027
45	Nana Syed	(Singapore)		(Singapore) Hougang United U21	2025	2027
66	Matin Manaf	(Singapore)		(Singapore) Hougang United U21	2025	2027
69	Rishon Soroya	(Singapore)		(Singapore) Hougang United U21	2025	2027
71	Amir Rasyif	(Singapore)		(Singapore) Hougang United U21	2026	2027
90	Jordan Emaviwe	(Singapore) (Nigeria)	9 April 2001 (age 25)	(Thailand) Chiangrai United	2026	2027
Midfielders
2	Mahamé Siby	(France) (Mali)	7 July 1996 (age 30)	(Malaysia) Selangor	2026	2027
6	Huzaifah Aziz	(Singapore)	27 June 1994 (age 32)	(Singapore) Geylang International	2025	2027
8	Sam Billington	(England)	21 September 2001 (age 25)	(Wales) Bala Town	2026	2027
10	Saifullah Akbar	(Singapore)	31 January 1999 (age 27)	(Singapore) Tampines Rovers	2025	2027
14	Arya Igami Tarhani	(Japan) (Iran)	24 February 2003 (age 23)	(Philippines) Cebu	2026	2027
22	Brant Tan Jun Rong	(Singapore)	22 November 2003 (age 23)	(Singapore) Hougang United U21	2023	2027
26	Jarrel Ong Jia Wei	(Singapore) (China)	26 October 2002 (age 24)	(Singapore) FC Jurong	2026	2027
28	Denzel Ari Thrumurgan	(Singapore)	2008	(Spain) La Liga Academy	2026	2027
30	Farhan Sahlan	(Singapore)	21 July 2003 (age 23)	(Singapore) FC Jurong U21	2025	2027
56	Lin Ze Hao	(Malaysia)	26 January 2007 (age 19)	(Singapore) Balestier Khalsa	2026	2027
72	Christopher Lee Yee Wen	(Singapore)		(Singapore) Young Lions	2025	2027
77	Lucas Cardoso	(Brazil)	8 June 1996 (age 30)	(Indonesia) Malut United	2026	2027
96	Aareez Eeshan	(Singapore)		(Singapore)	2026	2027
Strikers
9	Connor Flynn-Gillespie	(Scotland) (Spain)	20 May 1997 (age 29)	(Indonesia) Persiraja Banda Aceh	2026	2027
11	Ayman Kassimi	(Belgium) (Morocco)	8 October 2001 (age 25)	(Netherlands) MVV Maastricht	2026	2028
12	Hilman Norhisam	(Singapore)	24 May 2004 (age 22)	(Singapore) FC Jurong	2026	2027
16	Phutanet Somjit	(Thailand)	9 March 2008 (age 18)	(Thailand) Port	2026	2027
19	Oakley Cannonier	(England) (Saint Kitts and Nevis)	6 May 2004 (age 22)	(England) Liverpool U21	2026	2028
21	Amir Syafiz	(Singapore)	21 June 2004 (age 22)	(Singapore) Young Lions	2025	2027
23	Khairin Nadim	(Singapore)	8 May 2004 (age 22)	(Portugal) FC Vizela U23 (P2)	2026	2027
25	Jiang Zi An	(China)		(Singapore)	2026	2027
27	Ganesan Silloren	(Singapore)		(Singapore) Project Vaults	2025	2027
38	Natthakit Phosri	(Thailand)	8 February 2008 (age 18)	(Thailand) Port	2026	2027
47	Nigel Ho Yuan Tong	(Singapore)		(Singapore) Admiralty CSN	2026	2027
70	Ashvin Vela	(Singapore)	3 March 2005 (age 21)	(Singapore) FC Jurong	2026	2027
99	Syafi’ie Redzuan	(Singapore)	25 October 2003 (age 23)	(Singapore) FC Jurong	2026	2027
Players who left for NS during the season
16	Ajay Robson	(Singapore)	6 December 2003 (age 22)	Youth Team	2023	2025
56	Louka Tan	(Singapore) (France)	13 June 2005 (age 21)	(Singapore) Hougang United U17	2023	2025
	Gabriel Goh	(Singapore)	29 March 2004 (age 22)	(Singapore) FC Jurong U21	2024	2025
	Iryan Fandi	(Singapore) (South Africa)	9 August 2006 (age 20)	(Singapore) Hougang United U17	2022	2023
Players who left during the season

Remarks:
^{FP U21} These players are registered as U21 foreign players.

=== Women's squad (2026) ===
No.	Name	Nationality	Date of birth (age)	Previous club	Contract since	Contract end
Goalkeepers
3	Ishita Pathania	(Singapore)		(Singapore)	2026	2026
18	Tay Siew Yin	(Singapore)		(Singapore) Tanjong Pagar United	2026	2026
1	Nurul Faizah	(Singapore)		(Singapore) Still Aerion Women's	2024	2025
15	Intan Afiqah	(Singapore)		(Singapore) Tanjong Pagar United	2025	2025
Defenders
5	Michelle Ngui	(Singapore)		(Singapore)	2026	2026
6	Iffah Amrin	(Singapore)	16 January 2003 (age 23)	(Singapore) BG Tampines Rovers	2026	2026
7	Fathimah Syaakirah	(Singapore)		(Singapore)	2026	2026
10	Su Jingyi	(China)		(Singapore)	2026	2026
16	Rabiatul Ardawiyah	(Singapore)		(Singapore)	2026	2026
21	Anna Vaswani	(Singapore)	21 March 2008 (age 18)	(Singapore)	2026	2026
2	K.Harini	(Singapore)	20 July 2004 (age 22)	(Singapore) Royal Arion (WNL)	2025	2025
23	Adrianna Hazeri	(Singapore)	3 July 2006 (age 20)	(Singapore) Tanjong Pagar United (W)	2025	2025
24	Hailey Cheung	(Singapore) (Hong Kong)		(Singapore)	2025	2025
25	Tasneem Khozem	(Singapore)		(Singapore)	2025	2025
	Jaslyn Leong Fei Ping	(Singapore)		(Singapore)	2024	2025
	Claire Merrow-Smith	(Singapore)		(Singapore)	2023	2025
	Rachel Liew	(Singapore)		(Singapore) Still Aerion Women's	2025	2025
Midfielders
8	Angela Hu	(Singapore)		(Singapore)	2026	2026
11	Rachel Ngui	(Singapore)		(Singapore)	2026	2026
13	Devina Beins	(Singapore)		(Singapore) Royal Aerion	2026	2026
14	Tiana Shah	(Singapore)		(Singapore)	2026	2026
19	Fatin Syarafana	(Singapore)		(Singapore) BG Tampines Rovers	2026	2026
50	Venya Jain	(Singapore)		(Singapore)	2026	2026
	Victoria Tan	(Singapore)		(Singapore)	2024	2025
	Siti Nurfarah	(Singapore)	22 August 2006 (age 20)	(Singapore) Warriors FC	2024	2025
	Winette Lim Siu	(Singapore)	20 May 1999 (age 27)	(Singapore) Tiong Bahru FC (W)	2023	2025
	Nisreen Aziz	(Singapore)	20 May 2008 (age 18)	(Singapore) ESA Academy	2025	2025
17	Lily Rozana Joehann Aung	(Singapore) (Myanmar)		(Singapore) Tiong Bahru FC (W)	2025	2025
Strikers
9	Park Claire	(South Korea)		(Singapore) Nanyang Technology University	2026	2026
12	Nadirah Jeffere	(Singapore)		(Singapore)	2026	2026
25	Nabilah Jeffere	(Singapore)		(Singapore)	2026	2026
29	Syafina Putri	(Singapore)	9 August 2004 (age 22)	(Singapore) Lion City Sailors	2024	2026
48	Grace Monago	(Singapore)		(Singapore)	2026	2026
4	Raudhah Kamis	(Singapore)	4 March 1999 (age 27)	(Singapore) Tiong Bahru FC (W)	2023	2025
20	Clae Kho Tyen Ning	(Singapore)		(Singapore) Tiong Bahru FC (W)	2025	2025
	Sydney Hector	(Canada)	27 January 1997 (age 29)	(Singapore) Balestier Khalsa (W)	2024	2025
	Faith Ho Xin Ning	(Singapore)	14 October 2005 (age 21)	(Singapore)	2024	2025
	Claire Marie Tay	(Singapore)	14 January 2000 (age 26)	(Singapore) Still Aerion Women's	2024	2025
Players who left mid-season

== Coaching staff ==
Management Team

Position	Name
Chairman	(Singapore) Bill Ng
Vice Chairman	(Singapore) Pan Cheok Fun
General Manager	(Singapore) Dominic Wong

First Team

Position	Name	Ref.
Team manager (men)	(Thailand) Prat Malarat	
Technical Director	(Singapore)	
Head Coach (Men)	(Singapore) Akbar Nawas	
Assistant Coach	(Thailand) Thongchai Rungreangles (Spain) Enrique Sanchez Murillo (Singapore) Razif Ariff	
Goalkeeping Coach	(Singapore) (Australia) Scott Starr	
Fitness Coach	(Singapore)	
Match Intelligence	(Spain) Carlos Álvarez Aller	
Sports Trainer	(Singapore) Thomas Pang	
Physiotherapist	(Singapore) Alif Jamal	
Equipment Team	(Singapore) Richard Lim	
Logisitics Team	(Singapore) Wan Azlan Bin Wan Adanan	

Youth and Women Team

Position	Name	Ref.
Head Coach (Women)	(Singapore) G.Sivaraj	
Head of Youth (COE) & U19 Coach	(Tunisia) Walid Lounis	
U17 Coach	(England) Hamid Raeiskarimi	
U15 Coach	(Singapore) Hairil Amin	
U13 Coach	(Tunisia) Walid Lounis	

== Transfers ==
=== In ===
Preseason

Date (Note: Date of club's announcement, will be either date of club announcement or 1 Jun-2025, the date which the free agent start due to lapse of previous contract)	Position	Player	Transferred from	Ref
First team
24 June 2026	DF	(Singapore) Zulqarnaen Suzliman	(Singapore) Lion City Sailors	Free
1 July 2026	DF	(Singapore) Nicholas Jordan Sea	(Singapore) SAFSA	End of NS
1 July 2026	DF	(Singapore) Aqil Yazid	(Singapore) Young Lions	End of loan (Note: Aqil moves back to Young Lions for a 1/2 year loan)
1 July 2026	DF	(Singapore) Darren Teo	Free Agent	N.A.
1 July 2026	MF	(Singapore) Syafi’ie Redzuan	Free Agent	N.A.
1 July 2026	MF	(Malaysia) Lin Ze Hao	(Singapore) Balestier Khalsa	Free
1 July 2026	MF	(Singapore) Christopher Lee Yee Wen	(Singapore) Young Lions	End of loan
1 July 2026	MF	(Singapore) Jarrel Ong Jia Wei	(Singapore) FC Jurong	Free
1 July 2026	FW	(Singapore) Ashvin Vela	(Singapore) FC Jurong	Free
1 July 2026	FW	(Singapore) Hilman Norhisam	Free Agent	N.A.
1 July 2026	FW	(Singapore) Amir Syafiz	(Singapore) Young Lions	End of loan (Note: Amir Syafiz moves back to Young Lions for a 1/2 year loan)
3 July 2026	GK	(Japan) Takahiro Koga	(Singapore) FC Jurong	Free; 2 years contract till Jun-28
7 July 2026	FW	(Belgium) (Morocco) Ayman Kassimi	(Netherlands) MVV Maastricht	Free; 2 years contract till Jun-28
8 July 2026	MF	(Japan) (Iran) Arya Igami Tarhani	(Philippines) Cebu	Free
13 July 2026	DF	(Japan) Koki Kawachi	(Australia) Launceston City	Free
16 July 2026	MF	(England) Sam Billington	(Wales) Bala Town	Free
17 July 2026	MF	(Singapore) Khairin Nadim	(Singapore) Lion City Sailors	Season loan
30 July 2026	FW	(Scotland) (Spain) Connor Flynn-Gillespie	(Indonesia) Persiraja Banda Aceh	Free
31 July 2026	FW	(England) (Saint Kitts and Nevis) Oakley Cannonier	(England) Liverpool	Free; 2 years contract till Jun-28
1 August 2026	GK	(Singapore) (Vietnam) Keith Chung Wen Jie	(Singapore) SAFSA	End of NS
8 August 2026	DF	(Singapore) (Nigeria) Jordan Emaviwe	(Thailand) Chiangrai United	Free
11 August 2026	MF	(Brazil) Lucas Cardoso	(Indonesia) Malut United	Free
13 August 2026	DF	(Montenegro) Miloš Drinčić	(Montenegro) Buducnost Podgorica	Free
1 September 2026	MF	(Thailand) Natthakit Phosri	(Thailand) Port	Season loan
1 September 2026	MF	(Thailand) Phutanet Somjit	(Thailand) Port	Season loan
17 September 2026	MF	(France) (Mali) Mahamé Siby	(Malaysia) Selangor	Free
June 2026	MF	(Israel) Yanir Ben Eliezer	(Singapore) Balestier Khalsa	Free
Academy
Women

=== Out ===
Preseason

Date	Position	Player	Transferred To	Ref
First team
18 May 2026	DF	(Singapore) Anders Aplin	Retired	N.A.
26 May 2026	DF	(Thailand) Kanok Kongsimma	(Thailand) Nakhon Si United	Free
26 May 2026	DF	(Thailand) Parinya Nusong	(Thailand) Chonburi F.C.	End of loan
26 May 2026	MF	(Thailand) Saharat Panmarchya	(Thailand) Nongbua Pitchaya	End of loan
26 May 2026	FW	(Thailand) Settawut Wongsai	(Thailand) Khon Kaen United	Free
26 May 2026	MF	(Thailand) Chonlawit Kanuengkid	(Thailand) Uttaradit	Free
28 May 2026	FW	(Spain) Víctor Blasco	(Malta)	Free
28 May 2026	FW	(New Caledonia) (Australia) Jaushua Sotirio	(Australia)	Free
31 May 2026	GK	(Singapore) Zharfan Rohaizad	(Singapore) Lion City Sailors	End of loan
31 May 2026	FW	(Tanzania) (Canada) (Republic of the Congo) Gloire Amanda	(Australia)	Free
2 June 2026	DF	(Kenya) (United States) Nabilai Kibunguchy	(United States) Indy Eleven	Free
2 June 2026	DF	(Japan) Yuma Suwa	(Montenegro) OFK Grbalj	Free
3 June 2026	DF	(Singapore) Ryaan Sanizal	(Malaysia) Negeri Sembilan	Free
9 June 2026	FW	(China) Yang He	(China) Nanjing City	Free
30 June 2026	GK	(Singapore) Isaac Jonathan Hean-Oon Lee	(Singapore)	Free
30 June 2026	DF	(Singapore) Mikhael Ismail	(Singapore) PVOSC	Free
30 June 2026	DF	(Singapore) Adam Ali	(Singapore)	Free
30 June 2026	DF	(Singapore) Rishon Soroya	(Singapore)	Free
30 June 2026	DF	(Singapore) Iman Adli Haziq	(Singapore)	Free
30 June 2026	DF	(Singapore) Khilfi Aniq	(Singapore)	Free
30 June 2026	DF	(Singapore) (Philippines) Aryan Boon	(Singapore)	Free
30 June 2026	DF	(Singapore) Nicholas Jordan Sea	(Singapore) Xinhua FC	Free
30 June 2026	DF	(Lithuania) Algirdas Karlonas	(Singapore) Lion City Sailors	Free
30 June 2026	DF	(Singapore) Iryan Fandi	(Singapore) Young Lions	Free
30 June 2026	MF	(Philippines) Neil Charles Callanta	(Singapore) Tanjong Pagar United	Free
30 June 2026	FW	(Singapore) G.Sheeva	(Singapore)	Free
1 July 2026	FW	(Singapore) Farhan Zulkifli	(Singapore) Lion City Sailors	Undisclosed
2 August 2026	GK	(Singapore) (Vietnam) Keith Chung Wen Jie	(Singapore)	Free Agent
8 September 2026	MF	(Singapore) Woo Chun Wei	(Singapore) Balestier Khalsa	Free
SPL2, U23 & Academy
Women

=== National Services ===
Pre-season

Date	Position	Player	Transferred To	Ref
SPL2, U23 & Academy
October 2024	MF	(Singapore) Ajay Robson	(Singapore) SAFSA	NS till Nov 2026
July 2025	DF	(Singapore) Gabriel Goh	(Singapore) SAFSA	NS till July 2027
October 2025	FW	(Singapore) (France) Louka Tan-Vaissiere	(Singapore) SAFSA	NS till Nov 2027

=== Retained / Extension / Promoted ===
Date	Position	Player	Ref
First team
10 June 2026	MF	(Singapore) Saifullah Akbar	1 years contract till Jun 2027
11 June 2026	DF	(Singapore) (Netherlands) Jordan Vestering	1 years contract till Jun 2027

== Friendly ==
=== Pre-season ===
Win Draw Loss

8 August 2026 1	Tanjong Pagar United (Singapore)	1–2	(Singapore) Hougang United	Jurong East
	81'		Connor Flynn-Gillespie 45' (pen.); Khairin Nadim 56'	Stadium: Jurong East Stadium

15 August 2026 2026 Piala Serumpun	Negeri Sembilan FC (Malaysia)	2–1	(Singapore) Hougang United	Paroi
	Lucas Cardoso 57'	Report	Akhyar Rashid 58'; Takumi Sasaki 73'	Stadium: Tuanku Abdul Rahman Stadium; Attendance: 801

22 August 2026 3	Tampines Rovers (Singapore)	3–1	(Singapore) Hougang United	Bishan
				Stadium: Bishan Stadium

30 August 2026 4	Balestier Khalsa (Singapore)	1–1	(Singapore) Hougang United	Bedok
	55'	Report	Khairin Nadim 60'	Stadium: Bedok Stadium

5 September 2026 5	Semen Padang (Indonesia)	cancelled	(Singapore) Hougang United	Bekasi
				Stadium: Patriot Candrabhaga Stadium

3 October 2026 6	FC Jurong (Singapore)	3–2	(Singapore) FC Jurong	Jurong East
		Report		Stadium: Jurong East Stadium

14 November 2026 7	Tanjong Pagar United (Singapore)	0–3	(Singapore) Hougang United	Jurong East
		Report		Stadium: Jurong East Stadium

== Team statistics ==
=== Appearances and goals ===
As of 22 Nov 26

No.	Pos.	Player	SPL		Singapore Cup		Total	
No.	Pos.	Player	Apps.	Goals	Apps.	Goals	Apps.	Goals
2	DF	(France) (Mali) Mahamé Siby	4	0	0	0	4	0
3	DF	(Singapore) (Netherlands) Jordan Vestering	3	0	0	0	3	0
4	DF	(Ecuador) Washington Jaramillo	3+3	1	0	0	6	1
5	DF	(Japan) Koki Kawachi	4	0	0	0	4	0
6	MF	(Singapore) Huzaifah Aziz	4	0	0	0	4	0
7	DF	(Singapore) Zulqarnaen Suzliman	5+1	0	0	0	6	0
8	MF	(England) Sam Billington	0+1	0	0	0	1	0
9	FW	(Scotland) (Spain) Connor Flynn-Gillespie	1+4	0	0	0	5	0
10	MF	(Singapore) Saifullah Akbar	6	0	0	0	6	0
11	MF	(Belgium) (Morocco) Ayman Kassimi	5+1	1	0	0	6	1
12	MF	(Singapore) Hilman Norhisam	0	0	0	0	0	0
13	GK	(Singapore) Rauf Erwan	0	0	0	0	0	0
14	MF	(Japan) (Iran) Arya Igami Tarhani	4+3	0	0	0	7	0
15	DF	(Montenegro) Miloš Drinčić	6	0	0	0	6	0
16	MF	(Thailand) Phutanet Somjit	0+1	0	0	0	1	0
17	GK	(Japan) Takahiro Koga	6	0	0	0	6	0
19	DF	(England) Oakley Cannonier	4+3	1	0	0	7	1
20	FW	(Singapore) Syady Sufwan	0	0	0	0	0	0
21	FW	(Singapore) Amir Syafiz	4+3	0	0	0	7	0
22	MF	(Singapore) Brant Tan Jun Rong	0	0	0	0	0	0
23	FW	(Singapore) Khairin Nadim	2+3	0	0	0	5	0
24	GK	(Singapore) Aizil Yazid	0	0	0	0	0	0
26	MF	(Singapore) Farhan Sahlan	0	0	0	0	0	0
27	MF	(Singapore) Ganesan Silloren	0	0	0	0	0	0
29	DF	(Singapore) Rauf Sanizal	0	0	0	0	0	0
31	GK	(Singapore) Ridhuan Barudin	1	0	0	0	1	0
38	MF	(Thailand) Natthakit Phosri	2+2	0	0	0	4	0
61	GK	(Singapore) Isaac Jonathan Lee	0	0	0	0	0	0
66	DF	(Singapore) Matin Manaf	0	0	0	0	0	0
67	FW	(Singapore) G.Sheeva	0	0	0	0	0	0
69	DF	(Singapore) Rishon Soroya	0	0	0	0	0	0
70	FW	(Singapore) Ashvin Vela	0	0	0	0	0	0
77	MF	(Brazil) Lucas Cardoso	6	1	0	0	6	1
90	DF	(Singapore) (Nigeria) Jordan Emaviwe	7	0	0	0	7	0
Players who have played this season but had left the club on loan to other club
Players who have played this season but had left the club permanently

== Competitions ==
=== Overview ===
Results summary (SPL)

Overall								Home						Away					
Pld	W	D	L	GF	GA	GD	Pts	W	D	L	GF	GA	GD	W	D	L	GF	GA	GD
0	0	0	0	0	0	0	0	0	0	0	0	0	0	0	0	0	0	0	0

=== Singapore Premier League ===
Win Draw Loss

12 September 2026 1	Hougang United (Singapore)	2–2	(Singapore) Lion City Sailors	Bishan
	Ayman Kassimi 17' (yellow card) 83'; Oakley Cannonier 22'; Huzaifah Aziz (yellow card) 43'; Lucas Cardoso (yellow card) 71'	Report	Antonio Mance 38'; Bobby Adekanye 86'; Ryhan Stewart (yellow card) 78'	Stadium: Bishan Stadium; Referee: Oswind Suriya; Man of the Match: (Belgium) (Morocco) Ayman Kassimi

18 September 2026 2	FC Jurong (Singapore)	3–0	(Singapore) Hougang United	Jurong East
	Takuma Yamaguchi 23'; Haziq Kamarudin 45+7'; Mizuki Ando 73'; Kim Yoon-sik (yellow card) 83'; Andrew Aw (yellow card) 84'		Saifullah Akbar (yellow card) 45+2'; Zulqarnaen Suzliman (red card) 77'	Stadium: Jurong East Stadium; Referee: Jansen Foo; Man of the Match: (Japan) Seiya Satsukida

12 October 2026 3	Hougang United (Singapore)	1–2	(Singapore) Balestier Khalsa	Bishan
	Lucas Cardoso 29' (yellow card) 62'; Khairin Nadim (yellow card) 32' (yellow-red card) 84'; Amir Syafiz (yellow card) 35'; Huzaifah Aziz (red card) 41'		Marin Kuzminski 8'; Jakov Katuša 11'; Syafi Hilman (yellow card) 45+9'; Woo Chun Wei (yellow card) 57'	Stadium: Bishan Stadium; Referee: Syarqawi Buhairi; Man of the Match: (Japan) Takahiro Koga

16 October 2026 4	Tanjong Pagar United (Singapore)	2–1	(Singapore) Hougang United	Jurong East
	Riku Fukashiro 55'; Alex Masogo 61'; Aitor Mujica (yellow card) 25'; Syahrul Sazali (yellow card) 84'		Washington Jaramillo 70' (yellow card) 4'; Lucas Cardoso (penalty missed) 25 (yellow card) 85'	Stadium: Jurong East Stadium; Referee: Thawfeek Ahamad; Man of the Match: (Equatorial Guinea) (Spain) Alex Masogo

26 October 2026 5	Geylang International (Singapore)	3–0	(Singapore) Hougang United	Tampines
	Ryang Hyon-ju 45+2', 90+2'; Kaisei Ogawa 53'; Harith Kanadi (yellow card) 65'	Report	Miloš Drinčić (yellow card) 47' (yellow-red card) 75'; Mahamé Siby (yellow card) 61'	Stadium: Our Tampines Hub; Referee: Ahmad A'Qashah; Man of the Match: (North Korea) (Japan) Ryang Hyon-ju

31 October 2026 6	Hougang United (Singapore)	0–2	(Singapore) Young Lions	Bishan
	Saifullah Akbar (yellow card) 44'; Washington Jaramillo (yellow card) 77'	Report	Hisatoshi Nishido 4', 73'; Miyu Sato (penalty missed) 64 (yellow card) 85'; Fairuz Fazli (yellow card) 45+10'; Shuya Yamashita (yellow card) 51'	Stadium: Bishan Stadium; Referee: Aldrick Lee; Man of the Match: (Japan) Hisatoshi Nishido

22 November 2026 7	Hougang United (Singapore)	0–5	(Singapore) Tampines Rovers	Bishan
	Washington Jaramillo (yellow card) 64'		Hide Higashikawa 6', 65' (pen.), 79', 82'; Shodai Yokoyama 54'; Shah Shahiran (yellow card) 29'	Stadium: Bishan Stadium; Referee: Mazlan Pagira; Man of the Match: (Japan) Hide Higashikawa

28 November 2026 8	Balestier Khalsa (Singapore)	–	(Singapore) Hougang United	Bishan
				Stadium: Bishan Stadium

13 February 2027 9	Hougang United (Singapore)	–	(Singapore) Geylang International	Bishan
				Stadium: Bishan Stadium

19 February 2027 10	Hougang United (Singapore)	–	(Singapore) Tanjong Pagar United	Bishan
				Stadium: Bishan Stadium

28 February 2027 11	Lion City Sailors (Singapore)	–	(Singapore) Hougang United	Jalan Besar
				Stadium: Jalan Besar Stadium

6 March 2027 12	Hougang United (Singapore)	–	(Singapore) FC Jurong	Bishan
				Stadium: Bishan Stadium

13 March 2027 13	Young Lions (Singapore)	–	(Singapore) Hougang United	Jalan Besar
				Stadium: Jalan Besar Stadium

24 January 2027 14 (Rescheduled)	Tampines Rovers (Singapore)	–	(Singapore) Hougang United	Tampines
				Stadium: Our Tampines Hub

2 April 2027 15	Hougang United (Singapore)	–	(Singapore) FC Jurong	Bishan
				Stadium: Bishan Stadium

29 January 2027 16 (Rescheduled)	Tanjong Pagar United (Singapore)	–	(Singapore) Hougang United	Jurong East
				Stadium: Jurong East Stadium

16 April 2027 17	Geylang International (Singapore)	–	(Singapore) Hougang United	Tampines
				Stadium: Our Tampines Hub

25 April 2027 18	Hougang United (Singapore)	–	(Singapore) Balestier Khalsa	Bishan
				Stadium: Bishan Stadium

30 April 2027 19	Lion City Sailors (Singapore)	–	(Singapore) Hougang United	Jalan Besar
				Stadium: Jalan Besar Stadium

8 May 2027 20	Hougang United (Singapore)	–	(Singapore) Tampines Rovers	Bishan
				Stadium: Bishan Stadium

16 May 2027 21	Young Lions (Singapore)	–	(Singapore) Hougang United	Jalan Besar
				Stadium: Jalan Besar Stadium

Pos	Teams	Pld	W	D	L	GF	GA	GD	Pts
1	Lion City Sailors	6	5	1	0	25	3	+22	16
2	Tampines Rovers	6	5	1	0	18	3	+15	16
3	Geylang International	7	4	2	1	12	7	+5	14
4	FC Jurong	7	3	1	3	14	11	+3	10
5	Tanjong Pagar United	7	3	1	3	11	18	−7	10
6	Balestier Khalsa	7	2	1	4	9	15	−6	7
7	Young Lions (Note: Young Lions are not eligible to represent Singapore in AFC club competitions.)	7	1	0	6	8	25	−17	3
8	Hougang United	7	0	1	6	4	19	−15	1

Updated to match(es) played on 22 November 2026. Source: Singapore Premier League
Rules for classification: 1) Points; 2) goal difference; 3) goals scored; 4) wins

== Competition (SPL2) ==
Win Draw Loss

24 August 2026 1	Tampines Rovers (Singapore)	4–0	(Singapore) Hougang United	Tampines
	Yuma Kimura 16'; Kenshin Yamazaki 21'; Naufal Mohammad 64', 90'; Caden Lim (yellow card) 66'	Report	Lin Ze Hao (yellow card) 67'	Stadium: Our Tampines Hub

29 August 2026 2	Hougang United (Singapore)	0–1	(Singapore) Geylang International	Bishan
	Brant Tan (yellow card) 18'; Lin Zhen hao (yellow card) 30'	Report	Sahil Suhaimi 71'; Putera Muhammad (yellow card) 76'	Stadium: Bishan Stadium

2 September 2026 3	Balestier Khalsa (Singapore)	1–1	(Singapore) Hougang United	Bedok
	Danial Crichton 71' (yellow card) 89'; Woo Chun Wei (yellow card) 15'; Irfan Mika'il (yellow card) 57'	Report	Wong Ngaang Haang 54'; Lin Ze Hao (yellow card) 15'	Stadium: Bedok Stadium

8 September 2026 4	Lion City Sailors (Singapore)	5–1	(Singapore) Hougang United	Bedok
	Aufa Basyar 16', 50'; Izzan Rifqi 35', 45+2'; Ahmad Danial 87'	Report	Nigel Ho 58'; Farhan Sahlan (yellow card) 59'	Stadium: Bedok Stadium

20 October 2026 5	Hougang United (Singapore)	3–2	(Singapore) FC Jurong	Tampines
	Natthakit Phosri; Khairin Nadim; Washington Jaramillo	Report		Stadium: Our Tampines Hub

5 December 2026 6	Tanjong Pagar United (Singapore)	–	(Singapore) Hougang United	Jurong East
				Stadium: Jurong East Stadium

9 December 2026 7	Hougang United (Singapore)	–	(Singapore) Young Lions	Tampines
				Stadium: Our Tampines Hub

13 December 2026 8	Tampines Rovers (Singapore)	–	(Singapore) Hougang United	Tampines
				Stadium: Our Tampines Hub

16 December 2026 9	Hougang United (Singapore)	–	(Singapore) Geylang International	Tampines
				Stadium: Our Tampines Hub

20 December 2026 10	Hougang United (Singapore)	–	(Singapore) Balestier Khalsa	Tampines
				Stadium: Our Tampines Hub

5 January 2027 11	Lion City Sailors (Singapore)	–	(Singapore) Hougang United	Bedok
				Stadium: Bedok Stadium

8 January 2027 12	FC Jurong (Singapore)	–	(Singapore) Hougang United	Jurong East
				Stadium: Jurong East Stadium

12 January 2027 13	Hougang United (Singapore)	–	(Singapore) Young Lions	Choa Chu Kang
				Stadium: Choa Chu Kang Stadium

16 January 2027 14	Tanjong Pagar United (Singapore)	–	(Singapore) Hougang United	Jurong East
				Stadium: Jurong East Stadium

20 January 2027 15	Hougang United (Singapore)	–	(Singapore) Tampines Rovers	Bishan
				Stadium: Bishan Stadium

24 January 2027 16	Geylang International (Singapore)	–	(Singapore) Hougang United	Bedok
				Stadium: Bedok Stadium

30 January 2027 17	Balestier Khalsa (Singapore)	–	(Singapore) Hougang United	Bishan
				Stadium: Bishan Stadium

3 February 2027 18	Hougang United (Singapore)	–	(Singapore) Lion City Sailors	Choa Chu Kang
				Stadium: Choa Chu Kang Stadium

22 February 2027 19	FC Jurong (Singapore)	–	(Singapore) Hougang United	Jurong East
				Stadium: Jurong East Stadium

1 March 2027 20	Young Lions (Singapore)	–	(Singapore) Hougang United	Bukit Gombak
				Stadium: Bukit Gombak Stadium

5 April 2027 21	Hougang United (Singapore)	–	(Singapore) Tanjong Pagar United	Bukit Gombak
				Stadium: Bukit Gombak Stadium
