= 2024–25 Singapore Premier League =

Singapore Premier League
- Season: 2024–25
- Dates: 10 May 2024 – 25 May 2025
- Champions: Lion City Sailors (4th title)
- AFC Champions League Two: Lion City Sailors; Tampines Rovers
- AFF Club Championship: Lion City Sailors; Tampines Rovers
- Matches: 52
- Goals: 240 (4.62 per match)
- Top goalscorer: Tomoyuki Doi (44 goals)
- Biggest home win: Geylang International 7–1 Young Lions (25 May 2024); Lion City Sailors 7–1 Albirex Niigata (S) (23 June 2024); Lion City Sailors 7-1 Hougang United (28 July 2024)
- Biggest away win: Albirex Niigata (S) 0-6 Geylang International (6 July 2024); Young Lions 0-6 Lion City Sailors
- Highest scoring: Albirex Niigata (S) 7-2 Balestier Khalsa (18 July 2024)
- Longest winning run: Tampines Rovers (6 matches, 24 May 2024 –18 July 2024)
- Longest unbeaten run: Tampines Rovers (12 matches, 12 May 2024–11 August 2024)
- Longest winless run: Hougang United (8 matches, 10 May 2024 – 19 July 2024)
- Longest losing run: Albirex Niigata (S) (5 matches, 25 May 2024 – 12 July 2024)

The 2024–25 Singapore Premier League (also known as the AIA Singapore Premier League due to sponsorship reasons) was the 7th season of the Singapore Premier League, the top-flight Singaporean professional league for football clubs, since its rebranding in 2018.

== Format ==
The following key changes were made to the rules for the 2024–25 season.

1. Each squad must consist of a minimum 18 professional players and a maximum of 25 players.
2. Teams must field a minimum of five local players, which is in line with the quota set by the AFC, with the exception of Young Lions.
3. The requirement to field a minimum of one under-23 player of Singaporean nationality during the entire first half of a match has been lifted.
4. The mandatory fitness tests for SPL players will transition to a more data-driven approach, facilitated through technical GPS tracking.
5. Quadruple round-robin format where each team will play other four times in a season.
6. Each team can register a maximum of nine foreign players, including representation from an AFC member association and three players under the age of 21 at the point of registration. A player who is initially registered as an under-21 player will remain classified as such for subsequent season, regardless of whether they turn 21 years old, until the rules change.
7. For the U21 league, teams (including Young Lions and excluding SAFSA) are allowed to register a maximum of 8 foreign players who are 21 years or younger at the point of registration.
8. Due to the ongoing 2025 Singapore general election, matches will be played at Our Tampines Hub from 24 April to 4 May 2025.

The transfer window will be as follows:

1. 1st transfer window: 12 March 2024 to 31 May 2024
2. 2nd transfer window: 1 January 2025 to 31 January 2025

== Teams ==
A total of 9 teams compete in the league. Albirex Niigata (S) would function as a local team, starting this season. As such, they will be subjected to the same rules as Singapore based teams, while DPMM is an invited team from Brunei.

=== Stadiums and locations ===
Location of 2024–25 Singapore Premier League teams
Locations of the 2024–25 Singapore Premier League teams from Singapore

Image	Team	Stadium	Capacity
	Albirex Niigata (S); Tanjong Pagar United	Jurong East Stadium; Our Tampines Hub (match day 29 - Albirex)	2,700; 5,100
	Lion City Sailors; Balestier Khalsa	Bishan Stadium; Our Tampines Hub (match day 18, 28, 29 - LCS; match day 27, 28, 29 - Balestier)	6,254; 5,100
	Young Lions; Hougang United; BG Tampines Rovers; Geylang International	Jalan Besar Stadium; Our Tampines Hub (match day 28, 29 - Tampines; match day 29, 30 - Geylang; Hougang; match day 18, 30 - Young Lions)	6,000; 5,100
	DPMM	Hassanal Bolkiah National Stadium (Brunei); Jalan Besar Stadium (match day 3, 9, 14, 24); Our Tampines Hub (match day 28)	28,000; 6,254; 5,100

=== Personnel, kit and sponsoring ===
Note: Flags indicate national team as has been defined under FIFA eligibility rules. Players may hold more than one non-FIFA nationality.

Team	Head coach	Captain	Kit manufacturer	Main Shirt sponsor	Other sponsors
Albirex Niigata (S)	(Japan) Keiji Shigetomi	(Singapore) Ho Wai Loon	(Singapore) Fifty50	(Japan) Denka	List: **Apparel & Footwear & Training Wear** Dpro Logistics Namics Skechers Singapore; Front: Reeracoen Black Clover SingaLife g.spa Kubota; Back: Warrantee; Sleeve: EnglishCentral Kirin; Shorts: Gain City Miura; **Partners** Daiho Group JTB NSG Sanpoutei Ramen SMBC ACCEA Singapore PR Times Prestige Property ANA EAA Direct IGPI Group Ma Masion Dr. Stretch JPlus+ Salonpas Soken Medical OneTap Sports Crown Line Tomi Sushi Sankyu One Asia Lawyers SD Aircon SETA Technologies Hiroyuki AO Service Pro Itadakimasu Pocari Sweat KoachHub Fuji Electric Asia Pacific Sugoyose Any1 Choco
Balestier Khalsa	(Netherlands) Peter de Roo	(Slovenia) Alen Kozar	(Germany) Adidas	(United States) Jeep	List: Front: Weston Corporation Project Vaults Dr. Stretch; Back: Boys' Town YouthReach; Shorts: PSB Academy; Partners: TopGrid Pest StarBalm KoachHub The Original Vadai
BG Tampines Rovers	(Singapore) Gavin Lee	(Singapore) Syazwan Buhari	(Thailand) Warrix	(Thailand) BG	List: Back: Black Clover; Sleeve: Construction Investment Managers; Partners: StarBalm Therabody My Protein Singapore Rookbook The Physio Circle Ryudben Sports JSSL FC Dr. Stretch
DPMM	(Scotland) Jamie McAllister	(Brunei) Azwan Ali Rahman	(Brunei) Pitch	Royal Brunei Airlines	List: Brunei Shell Marketing Mitsubishi Baiduri Bank DST Setia Motors You C1000 BGIB Begawan Athlete Waznah StarBalm
Geylang International	(Singapore) Mohd Noor Ali	(Singapore) Joshua Pereira	(Thailand) FBT	(Singapore) Vector Green	List: Sleeve: Epson Optimum Nutrition; Back: Medcallz; Partners: City Football Club Dr. Stretch Koach Hub TRUE Fitness KoachHub Think Batik Koshin Kogyo Westpoint
Hougang United	(Nigeria) Robert Eziakor (interim)	(Singapore) Nazrul Nazari	(Spain) Kelme		List: Partners: Cafe Football (CF) The Arena SpeedFitness Advance Capital StarBalm My Protein Singapore
Lion City Sailors	(Serbia) Aleksandar Ranković	(Singapore) Hariss Harun	(Germany) Puma	(Singapore) SEA (Singapore) Shopee (Continental)	List: Front: AMP Lab (WPL only) Bone Setting (WPL only); Sleeve: Garena Shopee (SPL & WPL); Partners: Optimum Nutrition Mari Bank StarBalm Griddy Grid #WLJK
Tanjong Pagar United	(Singapore) Noh Alam Shah (interim)	(Canada) Matt Silva	(Thailand) FBT		List: Partners: Samtrade Academy Hyundai StarBalm The Rehab Lab
Young Lions	(Singapore) Fadzuhasny Juraimi (interim)	(Singapore) Ryaan Sanizal	(United States) Nike		List: Front: Catapult

=== Coaching changes ===
Team	Outgoing head coach	Manner of departure	Date of vacancy	Position in table	Incoming head coach	Date of appointment
Hougang United	(Germany) Marko Kraljević (interim)	Appointed to permanent role				1 January 2024
DPMM	(England) Adrian Pennock	End of contract	11 December 2023	Pre-season	(Portugal) Rui Capela	12 December 2023
DPMM	(Portugal) Rui Capela	Mutual Consent	5 July 2024	5th	(Portugal) Miguel Bragança (interim)	9 July 2024
DPMM	(Portugal) Miguel Bragança (interim)	End of Interim	9 July 2024	5th	(Scotland) Jamie McAllister	15 July 2024
Albirex Niigata (S)	(Japan) Kazuaki Yoshinaga	Mutual Consent	13 July 2024	8th	(Japan) Keiji Shigetomi	13 July 2024
Tanjong Pagar United	(Singapore) Hasrin Jailani	Re-designated as Technical Director	31 August 2024	9th	(Singapore) Hyrizan Jufri (interim)	1 September 2024
Tanjong Pagar United	(Singapore) Hyrizan Jufri (interim)	End of Interim	23 November 2024	9th	(Singapore) Noh Alam Shah (interim)	2 December 2024
Hougang United	(Germany) Marko Kraljević	Redesignated as Head of Youth Development	24 December 2024	7th	(Nigeria) Robert Eziakor (interim)	24 December 2024
Young Lions	(Singapore) Nazri Nasir	Overseas attachment	16 January 2025	8th	(Singapore) Fadzuhasny Juraimi (interim)	16 January 2025

=== Foreign players ===
Each club can now register a maximum of nine foreign players, including representation from an AFC member association and three players under the age of 21 at the point of registration. A player who is initially registered as an under-21 player will remain classified as such for subsequent seasons, regardless of whether they turn 21 years old, until the rules changes.

Teams can also register up to 8 Foreign Players who are 21 years or younger, at the point of registration for the U21 league. These players are eligible for the SPL.

- Players name in **bold** indicates the players were registered during the mid-season transfer window.
- Players name in italics indicates the player were out of squad or left their respective clubs during the mid-season transfer window.

Club	Player 1	Player 2	Player 3	Player 4	Player 5	AFC Player	U21 Player 1	U21 Player 2	U21 Player 3	Reserve League Players	Former players Unregistered players
Albirex Niigata (S)	(Japan) Shuhei Hoshino	(Japan) Koki Kawachi	(Japan) SteviaEgbus Mikuni	(Japan) Yohei Otake		(Japan) **Naoki Yoshioka**	(Japan) **Nozomi Ozawa**	(Japan) Shingo Nakano	(Japan) **Taiki Maeda**	List	(Japan) Yojiro Takahagi (Japan) Kai Yamamoto (Japan) Arya Igami
Balestier Khalsa	(Netherlands) **Anton Fase**	(Slovenia) Alen Kozar	(Japan) Riku Fukashiro	(Japan) Masahiro Sugita		(Japan) Kodai Tanaka	(Australia) **Cher Deng**	(Indonesia) Reycredo Beremanda	(Vietnam) **Hồ Tùng Hân**	List: (Malaysia) Lin Ze Hao	(Tunisia) Ismaïl Sassi
BG Tampines Rovers	(Serbia) Miloš Zlatković	(Japan) **Itsuki Enomoto**	(Japan) Seia Kunori	(Japan) Shuya Yamashita		(Australia) **Dylan Fox**	(Japan) **Arya Igami**	(Thailand) **Nanthiphat Chaiman**	(Thailand) **Witthawat Phraothaisong**	List: (Australia) Liam Buckley; (France) Alexandre Bertholon	(Japan) Kyoga Nakamura **^1** (Montenegro) Boris Kopitović (Thailand) Thitipat Ekarunpong (Thailand) Thanet Suknate
DPMM	(Iceland) **Damir Muminovic**	(Latvia) **Dāvis Ikaunieks**	(North Macedonia) Kristijan Naumovski	(Portugal) Miguel Oliveira		(Afghanistan) Farshad Noor	(Brazil) Gabriel Gama			List	(Australia) Patrick Flottmann (Mexico) Julio Cruz
Geylang International	(France) Vincent Bezecourt	(Japan) Rio Sakuma	(Japan) Ryoya Taniguchi	(Japan) Takahiro Tezuka		(Japan) Tomoyuki Doi	(Japan) Keito Hariya			List: (Australia) Jake Ellenberger; (Belgium) Nils Vandersmissen; (Japan) Sho Gamoh	(England) Zach Whitehouse (Australia) Barnaby Davies (Japan) Sora Tanaka
Hougang United	(Brazil) **Daniel Alemão**	(Croatia) Stjepan Plazonja	(Montenegro) Dejan Račić	(Montenegro) **Jovan Mugosa**		(Japan) Shodai Yokoyama	(Serbia) Ismail Salihović	(Thailand) **Parinya Kaochukiat**	(Thailand) **Ratthathammanun Deeying**	List: (Israel) Yanir Ben Eliezer	(Bosnia and Herzegovina) Petar Banović (Bosnia and Herzegovina) Faris Hasić (Serbia) Ensar Brunčević (Thailand) Puttipat Kaewsawad (Croatia) Kristijan Krajček
Lion City Sailors	(Belgium) Maxime Lestienne	(Croatia) Toni Datković	(Germany) Lennart Thy	(Netherlands) Bart Ramselaar	(Portugal) Rui Pires	(Australia) Bailey Wright	(Spain) Sergio Carmona	(Portugal) **Diogo Costa**	(Syria) **Ali Al Rina**	List: (Australia) Obren Kljajic; (Brazil) Enrico Walmrath Silveira; (England) Ewan Seddon; (England) Harry Spence; (India) Aaditya Rao; (Malaysia) Ashman Saravanan; (Portugal) Tiago Martins; (Slovenia) Benjamin Žerak; (Republic of Ireland) (Japan) Joshua Little	(Curaçao) Richairo Živković (New Zealand) Emmett Connolly (Australia) Novak Kljajic
Tanjong Pagar United	(Canada) **Matt Silva**	(France) Salif Cissé	(Japan) Shodai Nishikawa	(Japan) Tomoki Wada		(Uzbekistan) Timur Talipov	(Timor-Leste) Zenivio			List: (Australia) Thorsten Takashi Cross; (England) Casey Seddon; (England) George Thomas; (France) Thelonious Linden; (France) Enzo Saha	(France) Pathy Malumandsoko (Serbia) Stefan Paunović (New Zealand) Curtis Gray
Young Lions	(Japan) Jun Kobayashi	(Japan) Kan Kobayashi				(Japan) Kaisei Ogawa				List	(Japan) Itsuki Enomoto (Australia) Rashid Hayek

^1 Kyoga Nakamura was granted Singaporean citizenship on 25 October 2024.

== Results ==
=== 2024 SPL Interim Tournament ===
The interim pre-season tournament, a one-off tournament, to tide over this season was commenced from 23 February to 21 April 2024.

Home \ Away	ALB	BAL	TAM	GEY	HOU	LCS	TPU	YLI
Albirex Niigata (S)		3–7		3–0		3–1		
Balestier Khalsa							4–1	1–1
BG Tampines Rovers	7–1	3–3						4–1
Geylang International					0–3	0–1	3–1	
Hougang United			0–3				1–0	
Lion City Sailors		1–3	1–13		0–3			
Tanjong Pagar United	4–0							1–5
Young Lions				5–2	3–2			

Updated to match(es) played on 20 August 2023. Source: spl.sg
Legend: Blue = home team win; Yellow = draw; Red = away team win.
For upcoming matches, an "a" indicates there is an article about the rivalry between the two participants.

=== League table ===
Pos	Team	Pld	W	D	L	GF	GA	GD	Pts	Qualification or relegation
1	Lion City Sailors (C)	32	22	6	4	96	32	+64	72	Qualification for Champions League Two group stage & ASEAN Club Championship (Note: Since the winners of the 2024–25 Singapore Cup, Lion City Sailors, had already qualified for the AFC Champions League Two and ASEAN Club Championship, the spot given to the Singapore Cup winners (Champions League Two) was passed to the second-placed team.)
2	BG Tampines Rovers	32	19	7	6	84	37	+47	64	Qualification for Champions League Two group stage & ASEAN Club Championship
3	Geylang International	32	15	9	8	97	64	+33	54	
4	Balestier Khalsa	32	14	6	12	84	80	+4	48	
5	DPMM (Note: Ineligible for AFC competition spots)	32	12	8	12	54	61	−7	44	Transferred to the 2025–26 Malaysia Super League post-season
6	Albirex Niigata (S)	32	13	3	16	55	71	−16	42	
7	Hougang United	32	7	10	15	61	76	−15	31	
8	Young Lions	32	7	8	17	47	89	−42	29	
9	Tanjong Pagar United	32	3	7	22	35	103	−68	16	

Updated to match(es) played on 25 May 2025. Source: Singapore Premier League
Rules for classification: 1) points; 2) goal difference; 3) number of goals scored; 4) number of wins
(C) Champions

=== Fixtures and results ===
Teams	ALB	BAL	BGT	DPM	GEY	HOU	LCS	TPU	YLI	ALB	BAL	BGT	DPM	GEY	HOU	LCS	TPU	YLI
Albirex Niigata (S)		7–2	2–4	1–4	0–6	1–0	3–1	4–1	2–1		4–0	0–4	2–3	1–1	2–1	0–2	5–1	0–0
Balestier Khalsa	2–3		2–4	4–2	2–2	3–1	2–4	5–2	3–2	3–2		2–2	3–4	1–4	2–1	1–5	3–3	2–3
BG Tampines Rovers	3–1	3–1		3–0	2–2	5–1	2–2	3–0	2–2	2–3	0–1		1–0	3–1	2–4	0–0	5–0	2–0
Brunei DPMM	0–0	2–2	3–2		3–3	1–1	0–2	1–1	1–3	3–0	2–3	2–1		0–2	2–1	2–4	2–1	0–3
Geylang International	5–1	4–4	4–4	2–4		0–1	1–1	5–3	7–1	1–4	3–4	0–3	1–3		4–3	1–2	5–0	4–0
Hougang United	1–0	3–3	1–1	2–2	2–6		1–4	5–1	2–2	1–0	3–1	1–4	2–3	2–3		1–1	6–0	2–2
Lion City Sailors	7–1	3–1	0–5	3–0	2–2	7–1		3–0	3–1	6–0	0–1	1–0	0–0	2–3	3–1		4–1	3–1
Tanjong Pagar United	2–1	0–5	0–3	3–2	2–7	1–1	0–6		1–3	1–2	0–5	0–2	3–0	3–3	1–1	0–1		1–1
Young Lions	3–2	2–7	0–2	1–2	0–3	4–4	0–6	3–2		0–1	0–4	1–5	1–1	1–2	4–3	0–8	1–1	

Updated to match(es) played on 25 May 2025. Source: spl.sg
Legend: Blue = left column team win; Yellow = draw; Red = top row team win.
For upcoming matches, an "a" indicates there is an article about the rivalry between the two participants.

== Statistics ==
=== Top scorers ===
As of 25 May 2025

Rank	Player	Club	Goals
1	(Japan) Tomoyuki Doi	Geylang International	44
2	(Germany) Lennart Thy	Lion City Sailors	28
3	(Japan) Kodai Tanaka	Balestier Khalsa	24
3	(Montenegro) Dejan Račić	Hougang United	24
4	(Japan) Shingo Nakano	Albirex Niigata (S)	23
5	(Japan) Itsuki Enomoto	BG Tampines Rovers / Young Lions (Note: 6 for Tampines & 13 for Young Lions)	19
6	(Singapore) Shawal Anuar	Lion City Sailors	18
7	(Japan) Seia Kunori	BG Tampines Rovers	17
8	(Montenegro) Boris Kopitović	BG Tampines Rovers	16
9	(Croatia) Stjepan Plazonja	Hougang United	14
9	(Latvia) Dāvis Ikaunieks	Brunei DPMM	14
9	(Japan) Ryoya Taniguchi	Geylang International	14
9	(Belgium) Maxime Lestienne	Lion City Sailors	14
10	(Tunisia) (France) Ismail Sassi	Balestier Khalsa	13
11	(France) (Mali) Salif Cissé	Tanjong Pagar United	11

=== Top assists ===
As at 25 May 2025

Rank	Player	Club	Assists
1	(Belgium) Maxime Lestienne	Lion City Sailors	22
2	(Japan) Ryoya Taniguchi	Geylang International	18
3	(France) Vincent Bezecourt	Geylang International	15
3	(Japan) Kodai Tanaka	Balestier Khalsa	15
4	(Singapore) Faris Ramli	BG Tampines Rovers	12
4	(Singapore) Shawal Anuar	Lion City Sailors	12
5	(Japan) Seia Kunori	BG Tampines Rovers	11
5	(Netherlands) Bart Ramselaar	Lion City Sailors	11
5	(Japan) Takahiro Tezuka	Geylang International	11
6	(Japan) Yohei Otake	Albirex Niigata	10
6	(Croatia) Stjepan Plazonja	Hougang United	10
7	(Japan) Riku Fukashiro	Balestier Khalsa	9
7	(Singapore) Glenn Kweh	BG Tampines Rovers	9
7	(Japan) Tomoyuki Doi	Geylang International	9
7	(Japan) Kaisei Ogawa	Young Lions	9

=== Own goal ===
As of 16 May 2025

Player	For	Against	Date
(Singapore) Amirul Adli	BG Tampines Rovers	Geylang International	17 May 24
(Bosnia and Herzegovina) Faris Hasic	Hougang United	Geylang International	14 June 24
(Japan) (Nigeria) SteviaEgbus Mikuni	Albirex Niigata (S)	Young Lions	15 June 24
(Brunei) Nur Ikhwan Othman	Brunei DPMM	BG Tampines Rovers	13 July 24
(Singapore) Nur Adam Abdullah	Young Lions	Hougang United	14 July 24
(Japan) (Nigeria) SteviaEgbus Mikuni	Albirex Niigata (S)	Young Lions	4 Aug 24
(Singapore) Faizal Roslan	Tanjong Pagar United	Brunei DPMM	31 Aug 24
(Serbia) Ismail Salihović	Hougang United	Brunei DPMM	27 Sept 24
(Singapore) (Nigeria) Jordan Emaviwe	Balestier Khalsa	Albirex Niigata (S)	28 Sept 24
(Singapore) Ethan Pinto	Young Lions	BG Tampines Rovers	8 Feb 25
(Canada) (Portugal) Matt Silva	Tanjong Pagar United	Albirex Niigata (S)	21 Feb 25
(Iceland) Damir Muminovic	Brunei DPMM	BG Tampines Rovers	23 Feb 25
(Japan) Keito Hariya	Geylang International	Balestier Khalsa	7 Mar 25
(Singapore) Madhu Mohana	Balestier Khalsa	Geylang International	7 Mar 25
(Singapore) Marcus Mosses	Tanjong Pagar United	Balestier Khalsa	5 Apr 25
(Singapore) Ikram Mikhail Mustaqim	Young Lions	Lion City Sailors	6 Apr 25
(Singapore) Raihan Rahman	Tanjong Pagar United	Young Lions	7 May 25
(Australia) Thorsten Takashi Cross	Tanjong Pagar United	Albirex Niigata (S)	16 May 25

=== Hat-tricks ===
As of 19 May 2025

Player	For	Against	Result (Date)
(Japan) Tomoyuki Doi	Geylang International	Young Lions	7–1 (25 May 2024)
(Japan) Tomoyuki Doi	Geylang International	Hougang United	6–2 (14 June 2024)
(Japan) Tomoyuki Doi	Geylang International	Albirex Niigata (S)	6–0 (6 July 2024)
(Japan) Shingo Nakano	Albirex Niigata (S)	Balestier Khalsa	7–2 (18 July 2024)
(Singapore) Daniel Goh	Albirex Niigata (S)	Balestier Khalsa	7–2 (18 July 2024)
(Japan) Kodai Tanaka	Balestier Khalsa	Tanjong Pagar United	5–2 (24 July 2024)
(Montenegro) Dejan Račić	Hougang United	Tanjong Pagar United	5–1 (11 Aug 2024)
(Tunisia) (France) Ismaïl Sassi	Balestier Khalsa	Young Lions	7–2 (31 Aug 2024)
(Japan) Tomoyuki Doi	Geylang International	Albirex Niigata (S)	5–1 (15 Sept 2024)
(Japan) Tomoyuki Doi	Geylang International	Tanjong Pagar United	7–2 (28 Sept 2024)
(Japan) Tomoyuki Doi	Geylang International	Young Lions	4–0 (3 Nov 2024)
(Germany) Lennart Thy	Lion City Sailors	Tanjong Pagar United	4–0 (9 Feb 2025)
(Germany) Lennart Thy ^{4}	Lion City Sailors	Balestier Khalsa	5–1 (23 Feb 2025)
(Japan) Tomoyuki Doi	Geylang International	Tanjong Pagar United	5–0 (27 Feb 2025)
(Germany) Lennart Thy ^{5}	Lion City Sailors	Young Lions	7–0 (6 Apr 2025)
(Japan) Tomoyuki Doi	Geylang International	Hougang United	4–3 (11 Apr 2025)
(Japan) Kan Kobayashi	Young Lions	Hougang United	4–3 (19 May 2025)

Note ^{4} Player scored 4 goals ^{5} Player scored 5 goals

=== Clean sheets ===
As of 24 May 2025

Rank	Player	Club	Clean Sheets
1	(Singapore) Syazwan Buhari	BG Tampines Rovers	11
2	(Singapore) Izwan Mahbud	Lion City Sailors	7
3	(Singapore) Hafiz Ahmad	Balestier Khalsa	5
4	(Singapore) Rudy Khairullah	Geylang International	4
4	(Singapore) Zaiful Nizam	Hougang United	4
5	(Singapore) Hassan Sunny	Albirex Niigata	3
5	(North Macedonia) Kristijan Naumovski	Brunei DPMM	3
5	(Singapore) Zharfan Rohaizad	Lion City Sailors	3

=== Penalty missed ===
As at 16 May 2025

Player	For	Against	Date
(Singapore) Hazzuwan Halim	Hougang United	Lion City Sailors	10 May 2024
(France) (Mali) Salif Cissé	Tanjong Pagar United	Albirex Niigata (S)	12 July 2024
(Japan) Kodai Tanaka	Balestier Khalsa	Tanjong Pagar United	24 July 2024
(Montenegro) Boris Kopitović	BG Tampines Rovers	Lion City Sailors	29 Sept 2024
(Japan) Kan Kobayashi	Young Lions	Brunei DPMM	18 Oct 2024
(Japan) Kodai Tanaka	Balestier Khalsa	Tanjong Pagar United	28 Oct 2024
(Japan) Shingo Nakano	Albirex Niigata (S)	Geylang International	9 Feb 2025
(Montenegro) Dejan Račić	Hougang United	Brunei DPMM	26 Feb 2025
(Singapore) Daniel Goh	Albirex Niigata (S)	Tanjong Pagar United	16 May 2025

=== Referee's record ===
As at 25 May 2025

Referee	Match	Yellow card	Red card	Second yellow card
Jansen Foo	17	69	1	2
Farhan Mohd	16	59	3	2
Clarence Leow	15	56	1	1
Andrea Verolino	15	46	0	1
Muhammad Taqi	11	41	0	0
Ahmad A'Qashah	13	38	2	0
Hilmi Fuad	13	35	3	4
Oswind Suriya	12	33	3	1
Zulfiqar Mustaffa	15	32	0	0
Taufik Thana	7	28	3	0
Syarqawi Buhari	8	27	1	2

=== Team's discipline ===
As at 25 May 2025

Team	Yellow card	Red card	Second yellow card
Hougang United	69	1	2
Brunei DPMM	68	1	4
Geylang International	54	1	0
Albirex Niigata (S)	50	1	1
Tanjong Pagar United	47	4	4
Lion City Sailors	46	2	0
Young Lions	45	2	1
Balestier Khalsa	42	4	1
BG Tampines Rovers	42	1	0

=== Player's discipline ===
As at 24 Apr 2025

Player	Team	Yellow card	Red card	Second yellow card
(Afghanistan) Farshad Noor	Brunei DPMM	9	0	1
(Singapore) Faizal Roslan	Tanjong Pagar United	8	0	2
(Uzbekistan) Timur Talipov	Tanjong Pagar United	0	2	0
(Brunei) Azwan Ali Rahman	Brunei DPMM	8	0	1
(Serbia) Ismail Salihović	Hougang United	7	0	1
(Singapore) Syed Akmal	Tanjong Pagar United	4	1	1
(Singapore) Madhu Mohana	Balestier Khalsa	4	1	0
(Singapore) Taufik Suparno	BG Tampines Rovers	4	1	0
(Singapore) Tajeli Salamat	Balestier Khalsa / Hougang United	4	1	0
(Singapore) Raoul Suhaimi	Young Lions FC	3	1	0
(Tunisia) (France) Ismail Sassi	Balestier Khalsa	3	0	1

== Singapore Premier League Awards night winners ==
Awards	Winners	Club
Player of the Year	(Japan) Tomoyuki Doi	Geylang International
Young Player of the Year	(Japan) Seia Kunori	BG Tampines Rovers
Coach of the Year	(Serbia) Aleksandar Ranković	Lion City Sailors
Top Scorer Award	(Japan) Tomoyuki Doi	Geylang International
Top Scorer Award (U21)	(Singapore) (France) Louka Tan-Vaissierre	Hougang United
Golden Gloves	(Singapore) Syazwan Buhari	BG Tampines Rovers
Goal of the Year	(Singapore) Shawal Anuar vs. BG Tampines Rovers (29/9/2024)	Lion City Sailors
Fair Play Award	(Singapore) BG Tampines Rovers	
Fair Play Award (U21)	(Japan) Albriex Niigata (S)	
Referee of the Year	(Singapore) Clarence Leow	

AIA Team of the Year
Goalkeeper	(Singapore) Syazwan Buhari (BG Tampines Rovers)			
Defence	(Croatia) Toni Datković (Lion City Sailors)		(Australia) Bailey Wright (Lion City Sailors)	(Serbia) Miloš Zlatković (BG Tampines Rovers)
Midfield	(Belgium) Maxime Lestienne (Lion City Sailors)	(Netherlands) Bart Ramselaar (Lion City Sailors)	(France) Vincent Bezecourt (Geylang International)	(Japan) Seia Kunori (BG Tampines Rovers)
Attack	(Germany) Lennart Thy (Lion City Sailors)		(Singapore) Shawal Anuar (Lion City Sailors)	(Japan) Tomoyuki Doi (Geylang International)
