= Hougang United FC =

Singaporean football club

Hougang United
- Full name: Hougang United Football Club
- Nickname: The Cheetahs
- Short name: HGU
- Founded: 1988; 38 years ago as Marine Castle United; 2011; 15 years ago as Hougang United
- Ground: Hougang Stadium
- Capacity: 3,800
- Chairman: Bill Ng
- Head coach: Akbar Nawas
- League: Singapore Premier League
- 2025–26: Singapore Premier League, 6th of 9
- Website: www.hgfc.com.sg
Home colours	Away colours

Hougang United Football Club is a professional football club based in Hougang, Singapore. The club competes in the Singapore Premier League, the top tier of Singaporean football.

Founded in 1998 as Marine Castle United, the club changed its name to Hougang United in 2011. Nicknamed the Cheetahs, Hougang United has played its home games at Hougang Stadium since its formation. Throughout the club history, they have won 1 Singapore Cup in the 2022 season.

== History ==
=== Beginning and breakthrough (1988–2001) ===
The club was founded as Marine Castle United Football Club in 1988 as a National Football League team which was formed by Newcastle United fans in the Marine Parade area. The club was nicknamed the Dolphins.

==== Becoming a professional club ====
In 1998, Marine Castle United managed to enter the S.League signing both foreigners players, Scott O'Donell and Bernard Aryee in their debut season in the professional league. However, the club struggled in its early foray, finishing in the bottom two for the next four seasons. The club's chairman during the time was Dilwant Singh.

=== As Sengkang Marine (2002–2004) ===
Marine Castle United then changed its name to Sengkang Marine Football Club in 2002. Sengkang Marine went on to finish in 8th position consecutively, its highest-ever finish. Financial difficulties forced Sengkang Marine out of the S.League in 2004.

=== Different identity as Paya Lebar-Punggol (2005) ===
In the 2005 season, Paya Lebar-Punggol was formed to replace Sinchi FC in the league. The club then went on to sign Kenan Ragipović, Moudourou Moise, Protais Bessala and Bae Jin-soo as the club foreign players for the season. However, the club finished the season at the bottom of the league with four points.

=== Sengkang-Punggol (2006–2011) ===
In January 2006, Sengkang Marine merged with Paya Lebar-Punggol to form Sengkang Punggol Football Club, with the club logo featuring a dolphin and main colour being sea blue. In September, Singapore-based Orientus Asia Hotels and Resorts became the main sponsor of the club with deal worth $250,000. The club continued to play in the league but never went higher than 10th place.

=== As Hougang United (2011–present) ===
On 1 January 2011, the chairman of Sengkang Punggol Football Club, Bill Ng, announced name change to Hougang United Football Club. In November 2014, it was announced that Hougang United and Woodlands Wellington will merge for the 2015 season. The proposed merger was unfeasible.

==== AFC Cup debut (2020) ====
Hougang United made their AFC Cup debut in the 2020 AFC Cup but due to the COVID-19 pandemic, the tournament got cancelled. They only played against Laos side, Lao Toyota, winning 1–3 at the New Laos National Stadium. The Cheetahs also qualified for the 2022 AFC Cup group stage where they played at a centralised venue, Thống Nhất Stadium. They started by winning 4–3 against Cambodian side Phnom Penh Crown and 3–1 against Laos side Young Elephants, before suffering a heavy defeat to Vietnamese Viettel 5–2.

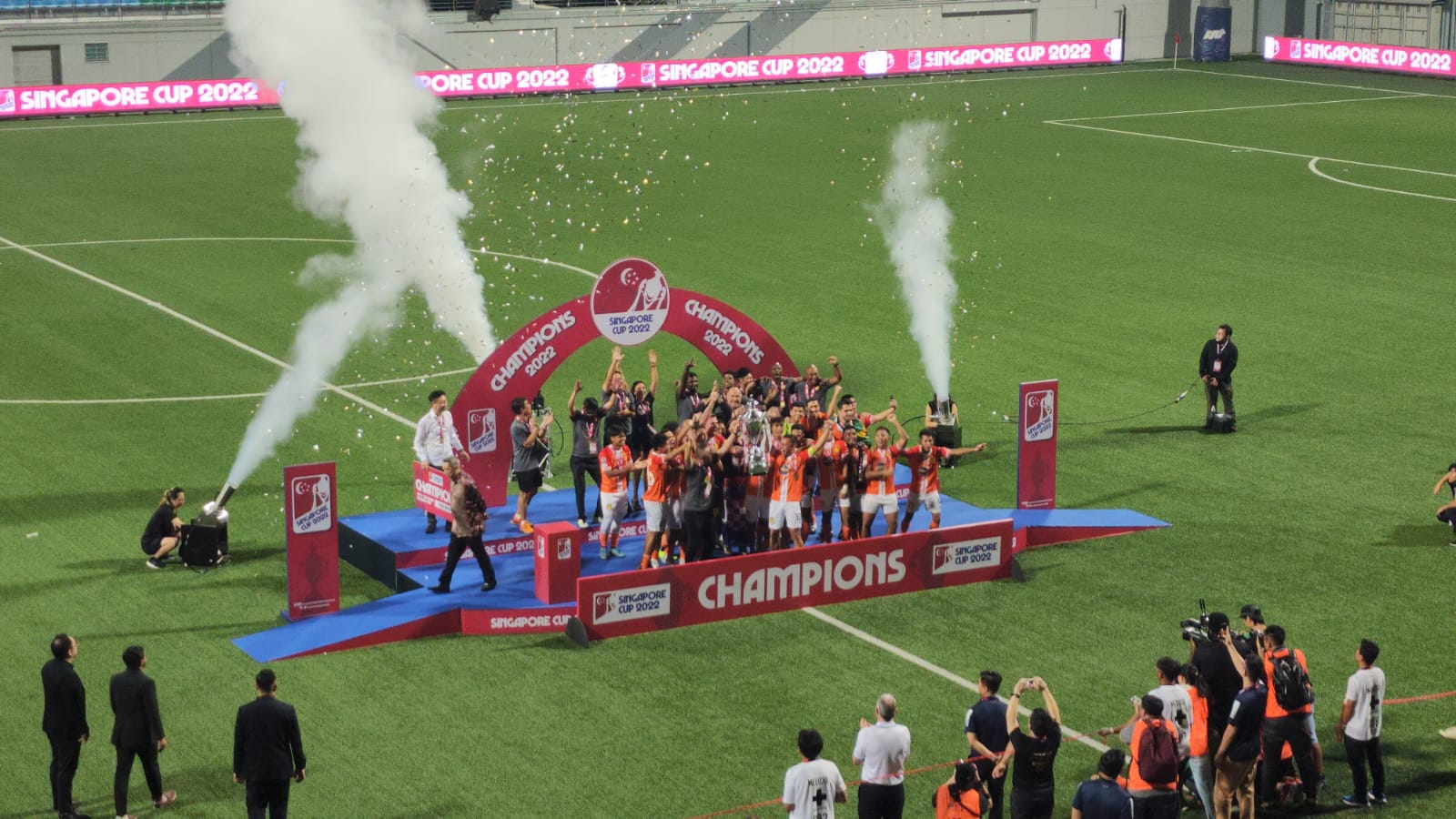
Hougang United players lifting the 2022 Singapore Cup trophy, the club's first silverware.

==== First silverware (2022) ====
On 19 November 2022, under the lead of caretaker manager Firdaus Kassim, Hougang United defeated defending champions Tampines Rovers 3–2 in the 2022 Singapore Cup final, in which Kristijan Krajček scored a hat-trick to secure The Cheetahs their first-ever silverware. The club finished 5th in the Singapore Premier League. In the 2022 AFC Cup, Hougang United was than placed in Group I alongside Cambodian club Phnom Penh Crown, Laotion club Young Elephants and Vietnamnese club Viettel. Hougang United recorded victories over Phnom Penh Crown and Young Elephants, winning 4–3 and 3–1 respectively. However, the club suffered a 2–5 defeat to Viettel which resulted in their elimination from the group stage.

Hougang United started off their 2023–24 AFC Cup campaign with a trip to Kota Kinabalu, facing Sabah on 21 September. They suffered a 3–1 away lost. However, in the next match against Haiphong at the Jalan Besar Stadium, Hougang United bounced back from 1–0 down as Đorđe Maksimović scored a brace for a 2–1 victory. Hougang United went on to have a great run in the 2023 Singapore Cup where they reached the final.

==== Notable foreign imports (2026–present) ====
While preparing for the 2026–27 season under new head coach, Akbar Nawas, HHougang United entered the transfer market to strengthen their squad ahead of the new season. Hougang United managed to sign several foreign, including Lucas Cardoso, Miloš Drinčić, Connor Flynn-Gillespie, Ayman Kassimi, Sam Billington, Takahiro Koga, Koki Kawachi and Arya Igami Tarhani. The club also made headlines with the signing of former Liverpool academy player Oakley Cannonier, as well as Mahamé Siby. Alongside their foreign signings, Hougang United strengthen their squad with several established local players, including Zulqarnaen Suzliman, Amir Syafiz and Jordan Emaviwe. In their opening league match of the season on 12 September 2026, Hougang United held reigning league champions Lion City Sailors to a 2–2 draw, securing a point in their opening fixture.

== Team image ==
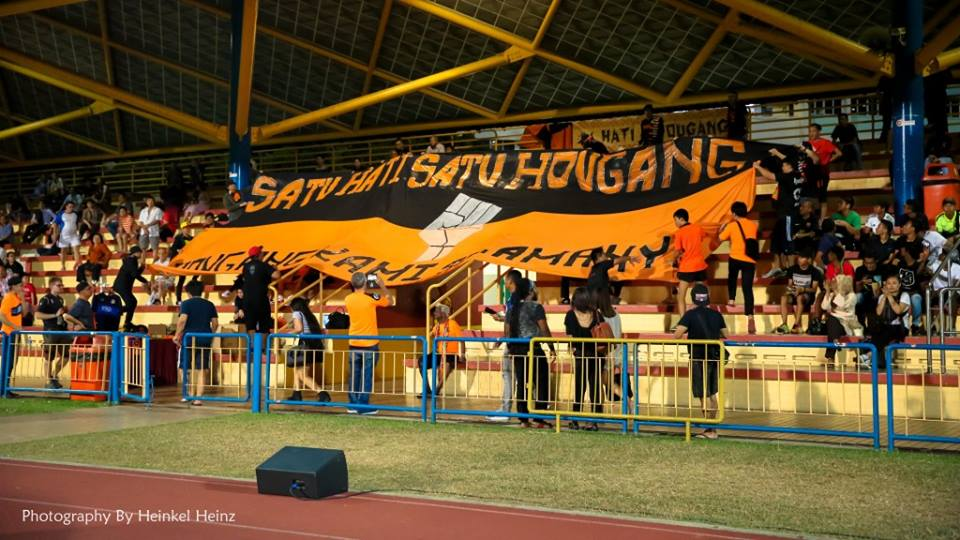
Hougang HOOLs tifo - Satu Hati, Satu Hougang (One Heart, One Hougang)

=== Supporters ===
==== Hougang HOOLS ====
The club has a supporters' club known as the Hougang HOOLS (Hougang Only One Love), which was established in 2010. The hashtag #1H1H (Satu Hati Satu Hougang) featured on the 2023 jersey.

=== Scholarship ===
The Hougang United Scholarship was launched in May 2015. The scholarship aims to support and facilitate the academic development of young non-professional footballing talents.

=== Name history ===
- Marine Castle United (1998–2001)
- Sengkang Marine (2002–2003)
- Paya Lebar-Punggol (2005)
- Sengkang-Punggol (2006–2011)
- Hougang United (2011–present)

== Kit manufacturers and shirt sponsors ==
Period	Kit manufacturer	Kit sponsor
2008–2009	(Germany) Uhlsport	No sponsor
2010	(Italy) Diadora	(Singapore) Westcomb Financial Group
2011	(England) Mitre	No sponsor
2012	(Thailand) Acono	No sponsor
2013	(Singapore) Waga	No sponsor
2014	(Italy) Macron	No sponsor
2015–2016	(Singapore) Vonda	(Singapore) ESW Manage
2017	(Singapore) Vonda	(Malaysia) Green Rubber
2018	(Singapore) Vonda	(Singapore) Assisi Hospice
2019–2021	(Thailand) Warrix	No sponsor
2022	(Thailand) Warrix	(Singapore) The Physio Circle
2023	(Thailand) Ari	(Singapore) The Physio Circle
2024–2025	(Spain) Kelme	No sponsor
2025–2026	(Thailand) Volt	(Singapore) SuperCharge
2025–present	(Thailand) IMANE	No sponsor

== Stadium ==
The Cheetah's home ground is Hougang Stadium. The stadium has a capacity of 3,800 people. They were the tenants from 1998 until 2023, before moving out to the Jalan Besar Stadium due to renovation. It has also used Bishan Stadium as their temporary home stadium or whenever the club is playing in the AFC competition.

== Affiliated clubs ==
- (Thailand) Nongbua Pitchaya (2025–present)

== Players ==
=== First-team squad ===
As of 13 September 2026

Note: Flags indicate national team as defined under FIFA eligibility rules; some limited exceptions apply. Players may hold more than one non-FIFA nationality.

No.	Pos.	Nation	Player
3	DF	SGP	Jordan Vestering
4	DF	ECU	Washington Jaramillo
5	DF	JPN	Koki Kawachi
6	MF	SGP	Huzaifah Aziz (vice-captain)
7	DF	SGP	Zulqarnaen Suzliman (captain)
8	MF	ENG	Sam Billington
9	FW	SCO	Connor Flynn-Gillespie
10	MF	SGP	Saifullah Akbar
11	FW	BEL	Ayman Kassimi
12	MF	SGP	Hilman Norhisam
13	GK	SGP	Rauf Erwan
14	MF	JPN	Arya Igami Tarhani
15	DF	MNE	Miloš Drinčić
16	FW	THA	Phutanet Somjit (on loan from Port)
17	GK	JPN	Takahiro Koga

No.	Pos.	Nation	Player
18	DF	SGP	Aqil Yazid
19	FW	ENG	Oakley Cannonier
20	DF	SGP	Syady Sufwan
21	FW	SGP	Amir Syafiz
22	MF	SGP	Brant Tan
23	MF	SGP	Khairin Nadim (on loan from Lion City Sailors)
24	GK	SGP	Aizil Yazid
25	FW	SGP	Jiang Zi An
26	MF	SGP	Jarrel Ong
27	FW	SGP	Ganesan Silloren
28	MF	SGP	Denzel Ari Thrumurgan
29	DF	SGP	Rauf Sanizal
31	GK	SGP	Ridhuan Barudin
38	MF	THA	Natthakit Phosri (on loan from Port)
77	MF	BRA	Lucas Cardoso
90	FW	SGP	Jordan Emaviwe

=== Reserve League (SPL2) squad ===
Note: Flags indicate national team as defined under FIFA eligibility rules; some limited exceptions apply. Players may hold more than one non-FIFA nationality.

No.	Pos.	Nation	Player
30	MF	SGP	Farhan Sahlan
32	DF	SGP	Afzal Halim ^{U21}
33	DF	SGP	Wong Ngang Haang
37	DF	SGP	Darren Teo
45	DF	SGP	Nana Syed
47	FW	SGP	Nigel Ho
53	GK	SGP	Keith Chung ^{U21}
56	MF	MAS	Lin Ze Hao

No.	Pos.	Nation	Player
61	GK	SGP	Isaac Jonathan ^{U21}
66	DF	SGP	Matin Manaf
70	FW	SGP	Ashvin Vela
71	DF	SGP	Amir Rasyif
72	MF	SGP	Christopher Lee
96	MF	SGP	Aareez Eeshan
99	FW	SGP	Syafi’ie Redzuan

=== On loan ===
Note: Flags indicate national team as defined under FIFA eligibility rules; some limited exceptions apply. Players may hold more than one non-FIFA nationality.

No.	Pos.	Nation	Player
16	MF	SGP	Ajay Robson (National Service until 2026)
68	DF	SGP	Iryan Fandi (National Service until 2026, to Young Lions)

== Management and staff ==
Position	Name
Chairman	(Singapore) Bill Ng
Vice chairman	(Singapore) Pan Cheok Fun
General manager	(Singapore) Dominic Wong
Team manager	(Thailand) Prat Malarat
Head coach	(Singapore) Akbar Nawas
Assistant coach	(Thailand) Thongchai Rungreangles
Assistant coach	(Spain) Enrique Sanchez Murillo
Assistant coach	(Singapore) Thomas Pang
Goalkeeping coach	(Australia) Scott Starr
Chief analyst	(Spain) Carlos Álvarez Aller
Sports Trainer	(Singapore) Razif Ariff
Head of youth	(Tunisia) (Singapore) Walid Lounis
Physiotherapist	(Singapore) Alif Jamal
Equipment officer	(Singapore) Richard Lim

== Honours ==
Cup

- Singapore Cup
  - Champions (1): 2022
  - Runners up (1): 2023
- Singapore Community Shield
  - Runners up (2): 2020, 2023
  - Plate Runners up (1): 2012
- Singapore League Cup
  - Runners up (1): 2012

== Award winners ==
=== Domestic ===
- League Player of the Year
  - (Croatia) Stipe Plazibat (2020)
- League Coach of the Year
  - (Singapore) Clement Teo (2021)
- Goal of the Year
  - (Singapore) Huzaifah Aziz against Lion City Sailors (12 April 2026)
- League Team of the Year
  - (Singapore) Nazrul Nazari (2019)
  - (Singapore) Faris Ramli (2019)
  - (Japan) Kaishu Yamazaki (2021)
  - (Japan) Tomoyuki Doi (2021)

== Records and statistics ==
As of 13 September 2026.

=== Top 10 all-time appearances ===
Rank	Player	Years	Club appearances
1	(Singapore) Nazrul Nazari	2016–2025	210
2	(Singapore) Lau Meng Meng	2009–2015	174
3	(Singapore) Nurhilmi Jasni	2012–2018	165
4	(Singapore) Faizal Amir	2010–2016	146
5	(Singapore) Fadhil Salim	2010–2014	142
6	(Singapore) Azhar Sairudin	2011–2014, 2017	138
7	(Singapore) Fairoz Hasan	2013–2017, 2023	137
8	(Singapore) Sobrie Mazelan	2008–2014	135
9	(Singapore) Fazli Jaffar	2011–2014, 2015	130
10	(Guinea) Mamadou Diallo	2008–2013	126

=== Top 10 all-time scorers ===
Rank	Player	Club appearances	Total goals
1	(Croatia) Stipe Plazibat	57	34
1	(Canada) Jordan Webb	88	34
3	(Guinea) Mamadou Diallo	126	28
4	(Croatia) Dejan Račić	31	26
5	(Brazil) Pedro Bortoluzo	30	23
5	(Brazil) Geison Moura	32	23
6	(Brazil) Diego Gama	63	22
7	(Croatia) Kristijan Krajček	56	21
7	(Singapore) Shawal Anuar	68	21
10	(Japan) Tomoyuki Doi	21	19
10	(Singapore) Nurhilmi Jasni	165	19

== Notable players ==
- (Australia) Scott O'Donell
- (England) Grant Holt
- (England) Michael Currie
- (England) Jason White
- (Canada) Jordan Webb
- (Guinea) Mamadou Diallo
- (Japan) Tomoyuki Doi
- (Brazil) Pedro Bortoluzo
- (Brazil) André Moritz
- (Croatia) Kristijan Krajček

=== Internationally capped players ===
AFC/OFC: (Australia) Zac Anderson; (Indonesia) Sutanto Tan; (Japan) Yuki Uchiyama; (New Caledonia) Jaushua Sotirio; (New Zealand) Cole Tinkler; (South Korea) Jang Jo-yoon; (Thailand) Settawut Wongsai; (Thailand) Yotsakorn Burapha	CAF: (Ghana) Bernard Aryee; (Ghana) Kim Grant; (Kenya) Nabilai Kibunguchy	UEFA: (Croatia) Zdravko Šimić; (England) Oakley Cannonier; (Montenegro) Dejan Račić; (Montenegro) Miloš Drinčić	CONMEBOL/ CONCACAF: (Canada) Gloire Amanda; (United States) Sam Strong

== Managerial history ==
The following table provides a summary of the coach appointed by the club.

Name	Period	Achievements
As Marine Castle United
(New Zealand) Alan Vest	1 January–30 July 2001	
As Sengkang Marine
(England) Trevor Morgan	1 August 2001–30 July 2003	
(England) Abdullah Noor	1 August–31 December 2003	
As Paya Lebar Punggol
(Malaysia) Chow Kwai Lam	1 January–4 June 2005	
(China) Qi Yubo	12 June–31 December 2005	
As Sengkang Punggol
(England) Trevor Morgan	10 January 2006–19 September 2007	
(Japan) Saswadimata Dasuki	20 September 2007–21 July 2008	
(Croatia) Mirko Grabovac (interim)	29 July–5 October 2008	
(Singapore) Swandi Ahmad (caretaker)	6 October–31 December 2008	
(Germany) Jörg Steinebrunner	1 January–24 June 2009	
As Hougang United
(Singapore) Aide Iskandar (interim)	25 June–31 December 2009	
(Singapore) Aide Iskandar	1 January 2010–31 December 2011	
(Croatia) Nenad Baćina	1 December 2011–30 November 2012	
(Singapore) Johana Johari (interim)	30 November–31 December 2012	
(England) Alex Weaver	1 January–31 March 2013	
(Singapore) Johana Johari (caretaker)	April–August 2013	
(Singapore) Amin Nasir	21 August 2013–31 December 2014	
(Singapore) Salim Moin	1 January–30 October 2015	
(Singapore) Satyasagara	1 November 2015–30 November 2016	
(Singapore) Philippe Aw	January 2017–June 2018	
(Singapore) Clement Teo	June 2017–20 November 2022	
(Singapore) Firdaus Kassim	20 November 2022–17 April 2023	2022 Singapore Cup
(Croatia) Marko Kraljević	17 April 2023–24 December 2024	2023 Singapore Cup runner-up
(Nigeria) Robert Eziakor (interim)	24 December 2024–27 October 2025	
(Thailand) Pannarai Pansiri	27 October 2025–12 April 2026	
(Singapore) Akbar Nawas	12 April 2026–present	

== Season by season record ==
Season	Name of club	League	Pos.	P	W	D	L	GS	GA	Pts	Singapore Cup	League Cup
1998	Marine Castle United	S.League	11th	20	2	3	15	19	44	9	Group stage	
1999	Marine Castle United	S.League	12th	22	3	3	16	21	56	12	Round of 16	
2000	Marine Castle United	S.League	11th	22	4	4	14	18	45	16	Round of 16	
2001	Marine Castle United	S.League	11th	33	7	6	20	35	71	27	Group stage	
2002	Sengkang Marine	S.League	8th	33	11	6	16	62	84	39	Semi-finals	
2003	Sengkang Marine	S.League	8th	33	7	8–1	17	32	66	38	Group stage	
2004												
2005	Paya Lebar Punggol	S.League	10th	27	1	1	25	23	78	4	Preliminary	
2006	Sengkang Punggol	S.League	11th	30	4	6	20	32	72	18	Quarter-finals	
2007	Sengkang Punggol	S.League	11th	33	5	10	18	39	69	25	Quarter-finals	Runners-up
2008	Sengkang Punggol	S.League	11th	33	3	10	20	13	54	19	Round of 16	Preliminary
2009	Sengkang Punggol	S.League	10th	30	5	6	19	26	58	21	Round of 16	Group stage
2010	Sengkang Punggol	S.League	11th	33	7	6	20	24	48	27	Round of 16	Semi-finals
2011	Hougang United	S.League	7th	33	15	3	15	55	63	43*	Semi-finals	Runners-up
2012	Hougang United	S.League	8th	24	7	8	9	31	33	29	Quarter-finals	Quarter-finals
2013	Hougang United	S.League	10th	27	9	3	15	37	40	30	Quarter-finals	Group stage
2014	Hougang United	S.League	7th	27	12	6	9	49	42	42	Preliminary	Semi-finals
2015	Hougang United	S.League	10th	27	4	9	14	28	42	21	Preliminary	Semi-finals
2016	Hougang United	S.League	6th	24	9	5	10	35	39	32	Preliminary	Group stage
2017	Hougang United	S.League	6th	24	9	3	12	24	31	30	Semi-finals	Group stage
2018	Hougang United	Singapore Premier League	9th	24	2	6	16	22	44	12	Quarter-finals	
2019	Hougang United	Singapore Premier League	3rd	24	13	4	7	58	45	43	Group stage	
2020	Hougang United	Singapore Premier League	6th	14	4	3	7	19	24	15		
2021	Hougang United	Singapore Premier League	3rd	21	10	4	7	48	40	34		
2022	Hougang United	Singapore Premier League	5th	28	10	9	9	65	71	39	Winners	
2023	Hougang United	Singapore Premier League	6th	24	9	2	13	37	57	29	Runners-up	
2024–25	Hougang United	Singapore Premier League	7th	32	7	10	15	61	76	31	Group stage	
2025–26	Hougang United	Singapore Premier League	6th	21	7	0	14	24	41	21	Group stage	

- 2003 saw the introduction of penalty shoot-outs if a match ended in a draw in regular time. Winners of penalty shoot-outs gained two points instead of one.
- Sengkang Marine sat out the 2004 S.League season. They merged with Paya Lebar Punggol to form Sengkang Marine on their return to the S.League in 2006.
- Hougang United deducted 5-point for a pre-match brawl with Etoile during the 2011 season.

== Continental record ==
Season	Competition	Round	Club	Home	Away	Aggregate
2020	AFC Cup	Group F	(Laos) Lao Toyota	Cancelled	3–1	3rd out of 4
2020	AFC Cup	Group F	(Vietnam) Hồ Chí Minh City	2–3	Cancelled	3rd out of 4
2020	AFC Cup	Group F	(Myanmar) Yangon United	Cancelled	0–1	3rd out of 4
2022	AFC Cup	Group I	(Cambodia) Phnom Penh Crown	4–3		2nd out of 4
2022	AFC Cup	Group I	(Laos) Young Elephants		3–1	2nd out of 4
2022	AFC Cup	Group I	(Vietnam) Viettel	2–5		2nd out of 4
2023–24	AFC Cup	Group H	(Malaysia) Sabah	1–4	1–3	4th out of 4
2023–24	AFC Cup	Group H	(Vietnam) Hải Phòng	2–1	0–4	4th out of 4
2023–24	AFC Cup	Group H	(Indonesia) PSM Makassar	1–3	1–3	4th out of 4
