= Scott O'Donell =

Australian soccer player (born 1967)

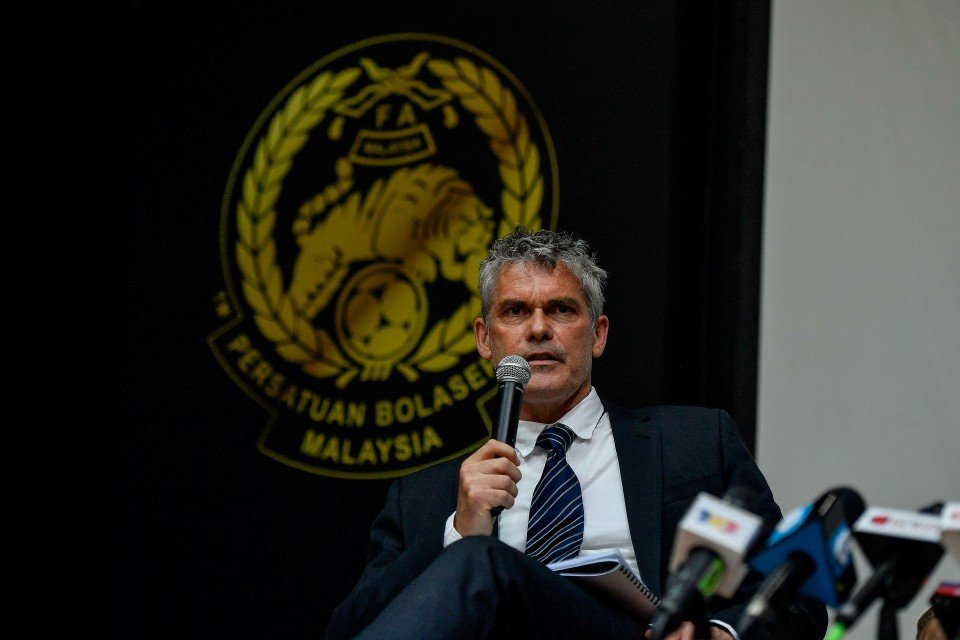
- O'Donell in 2022

Personal information
- Date of birth: 16 June 1967 (age 59)
- Place of birth: Sydney, Australia
- Height: 1.86 m (6 ft 1 in)
- Position: Defender

Senior career*
Years	Team	Apps	(Gls)
1984–1985	Auburn Uruguay		
1986–1988	Penrith Uruguay		
1989	Rockdale Ilinden		
1989	Napier City Rovers	3	
1989–1993	Parramatta Eagles		
1994–1995	Kuala Lumpur	35	(3)
1995–1996	Parramatta Eagles		
1996–1997	Tampines Rovers		
1998–1999	Marine Castle United		
1999–2000	Tampines Rovers		

Managerial career
- 2003–2005: Geylang United
- 2005–2007: Cambodia
- 2009–2010: Cambodia
- 2012–2017: India (technical director)
- 2022–: Malaysia (technical director)
- * Club domestic league appearances and goals as of 9 August 2007 ‡ National team caps and goals as of 9 August 2007

Scott O'Donell (born 16 June 1967) is Technical Director of the FAM in January 2022, Scott O'Donell was appointed by the Football Association of Malaysia as their new technical director replacing Ong Kim Swee who tendered his resignation on October 4, 2021 after accepting the position as the new head coach of Sabah. He is a former director of coach education for the Asian Football Confederation. He was S. League Coach of the Year 2003.
