= Tomoyuki Doi =

Japanese footballer

Personal information
- Date of birth: 24 September 1997 (age 29)
- Place of birth: Hyōgo, Japan
- Height: 1.79 m (5 ft 10 in)
- Position: Forward

Team information
- Current team: Chonburi
- Number: 17

Youth career
- Otsumo SC
- –2013: Estrela Himeji
- 2013–2015: Kobe Koryo Gakuen High School

College career
Years	Team	Apps	(Gls)
2016–2019	Tokoha University		

Senior career*
Years	Team	Apps	(Gls)
2020–2021	Albirex Niigata (S)	14	(11)
2021–2022	Hougang United	21	(19)
2022–2023	Fujieda MYFC	17	(4)
2023	Bylis	7	(1)
2024–2025	Geylang International	31	(44)
2025–2026	BG Pathum United	25	(11)
2026–	Chonburi	0	(0)
- * Club domestic league appearances and goals as of 24 December 2025

Tomoyuki Doi (土井 智之, Doi Tomoyuki; born 24 September 1997) is a Japanese professional footballer who plays primarily as a striker for Thai League 1 club, Chonburi. Doi is known for his finishing, long range efforts and technical abilities.

Doi won the Singapore Premier League 'Player Of The Year' award in the 2021 and 2024–25 season. He also holds the record for scoring 44 league goals in a single season in the 24–25 season, the most of any top flight footballer that season.

== Club career ==
=== Albriex Niigata (Singapore) ===
Doi's supreme form was a key factor for Albirex Niigata (S)’s triumph in the 2020 Singapore Premier League season as he smashed in 11 goals and made three assists in 14 appearances. He also registered both the most shots (83) and shots on target (43) of any player in the league. Doi's performance in the league earned him a nomination for the 2020 Singapore Premier League 'Player of the Year' award.

=== Hougang United ===
Following his exploits with the White Swans last season, Doi was snapped up by Hougang United for the 2021 Singapore Premier League season. Doi started his career with the Cheetahs at a blistering pace, hitting 4 goals in his first 3 matches for the club. His form saw him win the 'Player of the Month' award in March 2021. Doi notched his 10th league goal of the season in just 6 games as his sole strike against Balestier Khalsa sent his team to the top of the table. On 3 April, Doi hit a hat-trick in a 5–1 win against Tampines Rovers, bringing his tally for the Cheetahs up to 7 goals in 4 games, sending his team up to the top of the table. On 11 September, he scored another hat-trick against the same opponent bringing his total to two hat-tricks in a season.

Doi in 2021, secured both the Singapore Premier League 'Player Of The Year' and the Singapore Premier League 'Top Goalscorer' awards with 19 goals.

=== Fujieda MYFC ===
Doi returned back to his native country to join J3 league team, Fujieda MYFC on 13 January 2022. He went on to make a remarkable debut scoring a goal in a league match against Gainare Tottori on 12 March. In the next game against AC Nagano Parceiro on 19 March, Doi scored again in a 1–1 draw.

Doi then helped them to finish 2nd in the 2022 season, thus promoting the team to the J2 league.

=== Bylis ===
In January 2023, Doi went to Europe to join the club Bylis in the 2nd division Albanian league, Kategoria e Parë. On 29 January 2023, 17 minutes into his debut for the club, he scored a league goal against KS Kastrioti in a 1–0 win. On 1 July 2023, Doi was released from the club.

=== Geylang International ===
On 18 January 2024, Doi returned to Singapore to sign with Geylang International ahead of the 2024–25 season. He scored his first goal for the club in his debut match against Balestier Khalsa in a 2–2 draw on 10 May. Doi scored a hat-trick in a 7–1 thrashing victory over Young Lions on 25 May. In his next match on 14 June, he scored a back-to-back hat-trick in a 6–2 win over his former club, Hougang United. Doi scored his third hat-trick of the season on 6 July in a 6–0 thrashing win over Albirex Niigata (S). Doi would then go on to score his fourth hat-trick of the season against the same opponent in a 5–1 thrashing win on 15 September. In his next match against Balestier Khalsa on 28 September, he would go on to score a back-to-back hat-trick making it his fifth hat-trick of the season in a 7–2 thrashing, bringing his goal tally to 28 in 16 appearances for the club. On 3 November, Doi would go on to score his sixth hat-trick of the season in a 4–0 win over Young Lions.

In January 2025, Doi gained worldwide fame for being the only player in the world's top divisions to outscore Viktor Gyökeres with 34 goals and 9 assists in just 21 matches, scoring 8 goals more than Gyökeres. During the club’s first fixtures of the 2024–25 Singapore Cup on 2 February, he scored his seventh hat-trick of the season in a 4–5 loss to Balestier Khalsa. On 27 February 2025, he scored his eighth hat-trick of the season in a 5–0 win to Tanjong Pagar United. On 7 March 2025, Doi went on to scored his 39 league goal surpassing the all-time league records goalscorer of 38 goals set by Mirko Grabovac in 2001. On 11 April 2025, he scored his ninth hat-trick of the season in a 4–3 win to Hougang United. Doi secure top scorer of Singapore Premier League with total 44 goals from 31 games a new record of top tier in Singapore football in one season.

=== BG Pathum United ===
On 17 June 2025, Thai League 1 side BG Pathum United officially announced on their social media page that they have sign Doi ahead of the 2025–26 season. On 12 September, Doi scored the only goal in the match to secure his team the 3 points in a league match against Uthai Thani.

== Career statistics ==
As of match played 12 Sept 26

Club	Season	League			Nation cup (Note: Includes Albanian Cup, Singapore Cup, Thai FA Cup)		League cup (Note: Includes Thai League Cup)		Continental		Other		Total	
Club	Season	Division	Apps	Goals	Apps	Goals	Apps	Goals	Apps	Goals	Apps	Goals	Apps	Goals
Albirex Niigata Singapore	2020	Singapore Premier League	14	11	0	0	–		–		–		14	11
Hougang United	2021	Singapore Premier League	21	19	0	0	–		–		–		21	19
Fujieda MYFC	2022	J3 League	17	4	0	0	0	0	–		–		17	4
KF Bylis	2022–23	Kategoria Superiore	7	1	1	0	–		–		–		8	1
Geylang International	2024–25	Singapore Premier League	31	44	4	6	–		–		–		35	50
BG Pathum United	2025–26	Thai League 1	21	10	1	0	1	0	5 (Note: Appearances in AFC Champions League Two)	1	4 (Note: Appearances in ASEAN Club Championship)	1	32	12
Chonburi	2026–27	Thai League 1	2	0	0	0	0	0	0	0	0	0	2	0
Career total			113	89	6	6	1	0	5	1	4	1	126	97

== Honours ==
Albriex Niigata (S)

- Singapore Premier League: 2020

Individual

- Singapore Premier League Player Of The Year: 2021, 2024–25
- Singapore Premier League Team of the Year: 2021
- Singapore Premier League Top Scorer: 2021, 2025
- Singapore Premier League Player of the Month: March 2021
