= Lucas Cardoso =

Lucas Cardoso may refer to:

- Lucas Cardoso (footballer, born 1994) (Lucas Ferreira Cardoso), Brazilian football forward
- Lucas Cardoso (footballer, born 1996) (Lucas Cardoso Soares), Brazilian football midfielder
- Lucas Cardoso (footballer, born 2000) (Lucas Cardoso Moreira), Brazilian football midfielder
