= Arya Igami =

Japanese footballer

Personal information
- Full name: Arya Igami Tarhani
- Date of birth: 24 February 2003 (age 23)
- Place of birth: Tokyo, Japan
- Position: Winger

Team information
- Current team: Hougang United
- Number: 14

Youth career
- Buddy SC
- Kashiwa Reysol
- 2013–2015: Espanyol
- 2015–2021: Cornellà
- 2021–2022: Badalona

Senior career*
Years	Team	Apps	(Gls)
2024–2025	Albirex Niigata (S)	17	(4)
2025	→ Tampines Rovers (loan)	15	(2)
2026	Dynamic Herb Cebu	3	(0)
2026–	Hougang United	0	(0)

International career^{‡}
2018	Japan U15	4	(3)
- * Club domestic league appearances and goals as of 10:11, April 24, 2026 (UTC) ‡ National team caps and goals as of 10:11, April 24, 2026 (UTC)

Arya Igami Tarhani (タルハニ存哉, Igami Tarhani Arya; born 24 February 2003) is a Japanese professional footballer who plays mainly as a winger for Singapore Premier League club Hougang United. He has also represented Japan internationally at the youth level.

== Personal life ==
Arya was born in Tokyo, Japan. He was born to an Iranian father and a Japanese mother, making him eligible to represent both countries internationally.

== Youth career ==
Igami played youth football for Buddy SC before joining the youth team of J.League team Kashiwa Reysol. After being scouted in a camp in Japan, he played at a youth tournament organized by FC Barcelona in 2011, where he won Most Valuable Player. A year later, he was picked up by the academy of La Liga side Espanyol.

After three years in the Espanyol academy, Igami left the club but remained in Spain with the youth team of Cornellà. He stayed with the club through the COVID-19 pandemic before featuring briefly for the youth team of Badalona until 2022.

== Club career ==
=== Albirex Niigata (S) ===
In January 2024, Arya signed his first professional contract in Southeast Asia, signing with Albirex Niigata (S) of the Singapore Premier League. Arya featured for the team as their designated U21 player. He debuted on the opening matchday against Tampines Rovers, and scored his first goal in a win over Balestier Khalsa, where he also notched four assists. He scored 4 goals at Albirex that season, including crucial goals against Young Lions and Lion City Sailors.

=== Tampines Rovers ===
During the mid-season break of the Singapore Premier League, Arya was loaned out by Albirex to title challengers Tampines Rovers, taking up their designated U21 player spot. He made his debut on the league restart against Hougang United, later scoring against his former club. He made 15 appearances for Tampines in the league and Singapore Cup.

=== Cebu ===
After departing Albirex in the summer, Arya was signed by Philippines Football League side Dynamic Herb Cebu during the winter break of the 2025–26 PFL season. He made his debut on March 14, in a draw against Kaya–Iloilo, after subbing on for the injured Abou Sy.

Hougang United

On 8 July 2026, Arya returned to Singapore to sign for Hougang United, penning a one year contract with the cheetahs that lasts till the end of the 2026/27 Singapore Premier Legaue campaign.

== International career ==
=== Japan U15 ===
While playing for Cornellá, Igami received his first national team call up, representing the Japan under-15 squad in the 2018 EAFF U15 Championship. He made four appearances for Japan, scoring one goal against Chinese Taipei and a brace against the Northern Mariana Islands in a dominant win.
