= Connor Flynn-Gillespie =

Scottish professional footballer (born 1997)

Personal information
- Full name: Connor McKinnon Wylie Lester Flynn-Gillespie
- Date of birth: 20 May 1997 (age 29)
- Place of birth: Lewisham, England
- Height: 1.80 m (5 ft 11 in)
- Position: Striker

Team information
- Current team: Hougang United
- Number: 9

Youth career
- 2016–2017: Las Palmas

Senior career*
Years	Team	Apps	(Gls)
2017	Bo'ness United		
2018–2019	Marino	26	(8)
2019–2020	Polis Chrysochous	19	(2)
2020–2022	Kouris Erimis	16	(4)
2022–2023	Chalkanoras Idaliou	11	(1)
2023	Nelson Suburbs	5	(7)
2023	Miramar Rangers	6	(2)
2023–2024	Lynx	20	(14)
2024–2025	Lions Gibraltar	24	(9)
2025–2026	Persiraja Banda Aceh	25	(17)
2026–	Hougang United	0	(0)
- * Club domestic league appearances and goals as of 2 May 2026

Connor McKinnon Wylie Lester Flynn-Gillespie (born 20 May 1997), better known as Connor Gillespie, is a Scottish professional footballer who plays primarily as a striker for Singapore Premier League club Hougang United.

== Club career ==
Flynn-Gillespie was born in Lewisham, London, England to parents from Scotland and Jamaica and then raised in Tenerife. He began his early career at a young age with Las Palmas youth. In the autumn of 2017, he had a brief spell with Scottish side Bo'ness United. The following year, he would return to CD Marino and became a regular starter for his hometown club, playing 17 times in the first half of the 2018–19 season.

After that, he played for some Cyprus, New Zealand and Gibraltar football clubs, until in July 2025 signed a year contract with the Indonesian Championship club Persiraja Banda Aceh. He made his league debut on 13 September 2025, playing as a starter in a 2–3 lose against Adhyaksa Banten. On 22 September, he scored his first league goal in his second match against Sumsel United in a 3–2 lose. On 27 September, he scored a brace in a 2–3 away win over Sriwijaya; the latter result saw Persiraja its first victory in three matches. On 19 October, he scored the winning goal in a 0–1 away win over Persikad Depok at Pakansari Stadium. On 18 November, he scored another brace against Sumsel United in a match which ended in a 3–1 win. On 30 July 2026, Flynn-Gillespie joined Singapore Premier League side Hougang United on a one-year deal.
