= Lucas Cardoso (footballer, born 1996) =

Brazilian footballer (born 1996)

Personal information
- Full name: Lucas Cardoso Soares
- Date of birth: 8 June 1996 (age 30)
- Place of birth: Rio de Janeiro, Brazil
- Height: 1.81 m (5 ft 11 in)
- Position: Midfielder

Team information
- Current team: Hougang United
- Number: 77

Youth career
- 2014: Tigres do Brasil
- 2016–2017: Cabofriense

Senior career*
Years	Team	Apps	(Gls)
2017	Cabofriense	12	(0)
2017–2018	Atlético Reguengos	20	(0)
2019–2020	Juventude de Évora	5	(2)
2020–2021	Cabofriense	8	(0)
2021–2022	União 1919	15	(2)
2022–2023	Guiense	22	(4)
2024	Chernomorets	13	(3)
2024–2025	Dobrudzha Dobrich	53	(12)
2026	Malut United	12	(0)
2026–	Hougang United	0	(0)
- * Club domestic league appearances and goals as of 16 May 2026

Lucas Cardoso Soares (born 8 June 1996), is a Brazilian professional footballer who plays as a midfielder for Singapore Premier League club Hougang United.

== Club career ==
Born in Rio de Janeiro, Brazil, he played for numerous clubs in Brazil and Portugal between 2017 until 2020. After playing in Portugal, the following season, he rejoined Cabofriense and played in the regional competition Campeonato Carioca, in the 2020 and 2021 seasons. He returned to Portugal the following year, joining União 1919 in 2021, then moving to Guiense in 2022.

=== Chernomorets ===
Cardoso signed for Bulgarian club Chernomorets in February 2024 and made 13 appearances and 3 goals in Vtora Liga in the 2023–24 season.

=== Dobrudzha Dobrich ===
In June 2024, Cardoso signed a contract with Dobrudzha Dobrich to play in 2024–25 season. He made his league debut on 20 July 2024, playing as a substituted in a 1–1 draw over Fratria. Eight days later, he scored his first league goal for the team with scored a brace in Dobrudzha's 4–0 home win against CSKA Sofia II. On 13 August 2024, he scored the opening goal in a 6–1 over Nesebar. He made 35 league appearances for Dobrudzha, scoring 8 goals, during the 2024–25 season as the team were promoted to the top tier of the Bulgarian league.

On 28 July 2025, Cardoso scored his first league goal of the 2025–26 season, scoring a brace in a 2–1 win over Slavia Sofia. On 20 September 2025, he scored another brace for the club in a 2–2 draw against Lokomotiv Sofia. In January 2026, he officially left the club. He has played 18 matches in 2025–26 season and four goals for Dobrudzha.

=== Malut United ===
On 19 January 2026, Cardoso signed a contract with Malut United in Indonesia.

== Personal life ==
Cardoso is the son of Isaías Marques Soares, a former Brazilian footballer who played for Benfica in the 1990s.
