= 2025–26 BG Tampines Rovers FC season =

BG Tampines Rovers
2025–26 season
- Chairman: Shungo Sakamoto
- Head Coach: (Singapore) Akbar Nawas (until 11 Sept) (Singapore) Noh Rahman (until 14 Feb) (Nigeria) Robert Eziakor (until 3 Mar) (Japan) Katsuhito Kinoshi (until 15 April) (Singapore) William Phang
- Ground: Our Tampines Hub
- Singapore Premier League: 3rd
- Singapore Cup: Runners-Up
- ASEAN Club Championship: Group Stage
- AFC Champions League Two: Round of 16
- Singapore Community Shield: Winners
- Top goalscorer: League: TBD; All: TBD
- Highest home attendance: TBD
- Lowest home attendance: TBD
- Average home league attendance: TBD
Home colours	Away colours

The 2025–26 season season is Tampines Rovers's eighth season in the Singapore Premier League, their 30th consecutive season at the top level of Singapore football and 80th year in existence as a football club. It is also the club's third season to be known as BG Tampines Rovers as part of a three-year collaboration with Thailand's BG Pathum United, until the end of the 2025–26 season.

Tampines Rovers will also participate in this season's editions of the Singapore Cup, AFC Champions League Two and the ASEAN Club Championship.

Goalkeeping coach William Phang became ithe Stags' interim coach, its fifth coach for this season.

== Review ==
On 17 June 2025, head coach Gavin Lee left the club after eight years in charge to manage the Singapore national football team. On 20 June 2025, Akbar returned to the Stags, after nearly a decade, to take the role of head coach.

The Stags began the season by defeating Lion City Sailors in a 4–1 win in the 2025 Singapore Community Shield. They then beat Cebu F.C. 3-1 in their opening 2025–26 ASEAN Club Championship group game four days later.

On 24 August, the Stags drew with Geylang International FC, a 0-0 draw, in their SPL opener.

In September, Akbar left the club after a mutual agreement with assistant coach Noh Rahman taking over as head coach. Assistant coach Robert Eziakor took over as interim head coach.

On 13 December, former Albirex Niigata (S) player Tadanari Lee became the club vice chairman and sporting director.

On 15 April, Goalkeeping coach William Phang became ithe Stags' interim coach, its fifth coach for this season.

== Squad ==
=== Singapore Premier League / Singapore Premier League 2 ===
As of 1 January 2026

No.	Name	Nationality	Date of Birth (Age)	Last club	Contract Since	Contract End
Goalkeepers
24	Syazwan Buhari (C)	(Singapore)	22 September 1992 (age 33)	(Singapore) Geylang International	2018	2026
44	Danial Iliya	(Singapore)	6 February 2003 (age 23)	(Singapore) Young Lions	2020	2026
52	Jarec Ng Rui Le	(Singapore)	25 January 2008 (age 18)	(Singapore) BG Tampines Rovers U21	2025	2026
60	Kasey Rogers	(United States) (Singapore)	15 March 2009 (age 17)	(Singapore) BG Tampines Rovers U21	2025	2026
89	Luthfi Sufaiqish	(Singapore)		(Singapore) Sailors Development U17	2025	2026
Defenders
2	Raoul Suhaimi	(Singapore)	18 September 2005 (age 20)	(Singapore) Young Lions	2025	2026
4	Shuya Yamashita	(Japan)	16 April 1999 (age 27)	(Japan) Albirex Niigata (S)	2022	2026
16	Dylan Fox	(Australia) (Northern Ireland)	15 April 1994 (age 32)	(Finland) FC Lahti (F1)	2025	2026
17	Amirul Haikal	(Singapore)	11 October 1999 (age 26)	(Singapore) Young Lions	2021	2026
23	Irfan Najeeb	(Singapore)	31 July 1999 (age 27)	(Singapore) Young Lions	2021	2026
26	Takeshi Yoshimoto	(Japan)	23 October 2001 (age 24)	(Japan) FC Ryukyu (J3)	2025	2026
55	Kegan Phang	(Singapore)	23 January 2006 (age 20)	(Singapore) BG Tampines Rovers U21	2023	2026
56	Zeeshan Iskandar	(Singapore)	3 April 2007 (age 19)	(Singapore) BG Tampines Rovers U21	2022	2026
61	Shafrel Ariel	(Singapore)	6 April 2008 (age 18)	(Singapore) BG Tampines Rovers U21	2025	2026
66	Hadirul Harraz	(Singapore)	6 January 2006 (age 20)	(Singapore) BG Tampines Rovers U21	2023	2026
68	Liam Buckley	(Australia)	1 November 2007 (age 18)	(Singapore) BG Tampines Rovers U21	2022	2026
73	Adly Nufail	(Singapore)	18	(Singapore) BG Tampines Rovers U21	2025	2026
77	Sky Yeo Sze Kai	(Singapore)	18	(Singapore) BG Tampines Rovers U21	2025	2026
Midfielders
6	Jacob Mahler	(Singapore) (Denmark)	10 April 2000 (age 26)	(Thailand) Muangthong United (T1)	2025	2026
7	Seiga Sumi	(Japan)	11 June 2002 (age 24)	(Japan) Fagiano Okayama (J1)	2025	2026
8	Shah Shahiran	(Singapore)	14 November 1999 (age 26)	(Singapore) Young Lions	2023	2027
15	Ong Yu En	(Singapore)	3 October 2003 (age 22)	(Singapore) Young Lions	2022	2026
19	Joel Chew	(Singapore)	9 February 2000 (age 26)	(Singapore) Young Lions	2022	2027
21	Iman Hakim	(Singapore)	9 March 2002 (age 24)	(Singapore) BG Tampines Rovers U21	2021	2026
27	Anton Yen Goh	(Singapore)	26 May 2005 (age 21)	(Singapore) BG Tampines Rovers U17	2022	2026
30	Lim Zheng Wu	(Singapore)	12 May 2006 (age 20)	(Singapore) Young Lions	2026	2026
49	Yuki Kobayashi	(Japan)	24 April 1992 (age 34)	(Japan) Iwate Grulla Morioka (J4)	2026	2026
71	Ilham Iskandar	(Singapore)	30 July 2006 (age 20)	(Singapore) BG Tampines Rovers U21	2023	2026
72	Aaditya Aprameya	(India)	12 March 2009 (age 17)	(Singapore) BG Tampines Rovers U21	2025	2026
76	Rae Peh Jun Wen	(Singapore)	15 September 2008 (age 17)	(Singapore) Young Lions	2025	2026
78	Qylfie Ryan Bin Fazlie	(Singapore)	18	(Singapore) BG Tampines Rovers U21	2025	2026
79	Caden Lim Zheng Yi	(Singapore)	10 February 2006 (age 20)	(Singapore) BG Tampines Rovers U21	2025	2026
88	Koya Kazama	(Japan)	16 April 1993 (age 33)	(Japan) JEF United Chiba (J2)	2025	2026
Forwards
10	Faris Ramli (VC)	(Singapore)	24 August 1992 (age 34)	(Singapore) Lion City Sailors	2023	2026
11	Glenn Kweh	(Singapore)	26 March 2000 (age 26)	(Singapore) Young Lions	2023	2026
12	Trent Buhagiar	(Malta) (Australia)	27 February 1998 (age 28)	(Azerbaijan) Kapaz (A1)	2025	2026
13	Taufik Suparno	(Singapore) (Indonesia)	31 October 1995 (age 30)	(Singapore) Young Lions	2018	2026
14	Marc Ryan Tan	(Singapore)	8 January 2002 (age 24)	(Singapore) Young Lions	2025	2026
18	Zikos Vasileios Chua	(Singapore) (Greece)	15 April 2002 (age 24)	(Singapore) Geylang International	2025	2026
25	Hide Higashikawa	(Japan)	13 July 2002 (age 24)	(Japan) Tochigi City (J3)	2025	2026
29	Rasul Ramli	(Singapore)	26 March 2007 (age 19)	(Singapore) Young Lions	2025	2026
47	Matthias Josaphat Koesno	(Singapore) (Indonesia)	13 July 2006 (age 20)	(Singapore) SAFSA	2022	2026
50	Tallo Ngao	(Japan) (Senegal)	23 February 1999 (age 27)	(Malta) Naxxar Lions (M1)	2025	2026
74	Naufal Mohammad	(Singapore)	20 September 2006 (age 19)	(Singapore) BG Tampines Rovers U21	2023	2026
97	Jasper Chen Hong-An	(Chinese Taipei)	19 April 2009 (age 17)	(Singapore) BG Tampines Rovers U21	2025	2026
Players loaned out during season
	Andrew Aw	(Singapore)	29 March 2003 (age 23)	(Singapore) BG Tampines Rovers U21	2020	2026
5	Amirul Adli	(Singapore)	13 January 1996 (age 30)	(Singapore) Geylang International	2024	2026
Players on National Service
72	Shaddiq Mansor	(Singapore)	20 March 2006 (age 20)	(Singapore) BG Tampines Rovers U21	2023	2026
80	Kieran Tan Yi An	(Singapore)	1 January 2008 (age 18)	(Singapore) BG Tampines Rovers U21	2024	2026
	Caelan Cheong Tze Jay	(Singapore)	22 January 2006 (age 20)	(Singapore) BG Tampines Rovers U21	2022	2025
	Nicolas Michael Beninger	(Singapore) (France)	4 July 2006 (age 20)	(Singapore) BG Tampines Rovers U21	2022	2025
	Jovan Ang	(Singapore)	23 August 2006 (age 20)	(Singapore) BG Tampines Rovers U21	2022	2025
Players who left during season
20	Saifullah Akbar	(Singapore)	31 January 1999 (age 27)	(Singapore) Geylang International	2023	2026
49	Nalawich Intacharoen	(Thailand)	11 November 2003 (age 22)	(Thailand) BG Pathum United U18 (T1)	2025	2026
69	Witthawat Phraothaisong	(Thailand)	21 April 2007 (age 19)	(Thailand) BG Pathum United U18 (T1)	2025	2026
75	Yusril Hanapi	(Singapore)	7 May 2006 (age 20)	(Singapore) BG Tampines Rovers U21	2022	2026

Remarks:
^{FP U21} These players are registered as U21 foreign players.

=== Women ===
As of 25 July 2025

No.	Name	Nationality	Date of Birth (Age)	Last club	Contract Since	Contract End
Goalkeepers
1	Nurul Atiqah Salihin	(Singapore)	26 September 2006 (age 19)	JSSL Singapore	2022	2026
18	Nurul Haziqah	(Singapore)	23	(Singapore) Lion City Sailors	2026	2026
19	Beatrix Ong-Pratt	(United Kingdom)	15	JSSL Singapore	2026	2026
23	Izzati Safwanah	(Singapore)	30	Singapore Khalsa	2025	2026
Defenders
2	Nursabrina Iskandar	(Singapore)	23	(Singapore) Geylang International FC	2025	2026
3	Jia Samra	(United States)	15	JSSL Singapore	2026	2026
5	Kinley Melski (VC)	(Canada)	15	JSSL Singapore	2026	2026
11	Darvina Halini (C)	(Singapore)	38	(Singapore) Police SA	2024	2026
13	Shaniz Qistina	(Singapore)	6 June 2003 (age 23)	(Singapore) Tiong Bahru FC	2025	2026
14	Sharifah Amira	(Singapore)	30	(Singapore) Police SA	2024	2026
16	Aqilah Salihin (VC)	(Singapore)	24 January 2008 (age 18)	(Singapore) JSSL Youth	2023	2026
21	Sophie Lee	(Singapore)	17	(Singapore) JSSL Youth	2026	2026
24	Erika Seah	(Singapore)	19	(Singapore) JSSL Youth	2026	2026
Midfielders
4	Vivian Eng Yan Ran	(Singapore)	36	(Singapore) Balestier Khalsa FC	2024	2026
6	Maya Stephen	(United Kingdom)	16	(Singapore) JSSL Youth	2026	2026
7	Shazana Ashiq	(Singapore)	8 April 2004 (age 22)	(Singapore) Balestier Khalsa FC	2024	2026
12	Fitrizah Fitri	(Singapore)	23	(Singapore) Tanjong Pagar United FC	2025	2026
17	Siti Nor Aqilah	(Singapore)	7 October 2001 (age 24)	(Singapore) Geylang International FC	2024	2026
22	Mia Thomson	(Canada)	16	(Singapore) JSSL Youth	2026	2026
33	Lucinda Ratcliffe	(United Kingdom)	15	(Singapore) JSSL Youth	2026	2026
Forwards
8	Cristina Clavel	(United States)	16	(Singapore) JSSL Youth	2026	2026
9	Victoria Hudson	(United Kingdom)	16	(Singapore) JSSL Youth	2026	2026
10	Nahwah Aidilreza	(Singapore)	4 May 2007 (age 19)	(Singapore) Geylang International FC	2025	2026
25	Lyra Ayaana Rippon	(Singapore)	15	JSSL Singapore	2025	2026
Players who left mid-season
	Ananya Pande	(India)	15	(Singapore) JSSL Youth	2025	2025
	Erlysha Qistina	(Singapore)	26 June 2006 (age 20)	(Singapore) Tiong Bahru FC	2025	2025
	Iffah Amrin (Vice-Captain)	(Singapore)	22	(Singapore) Home United FC	2023	2025
	Anna Seng	(Singapore)	17	JSSL Singapore	2023	2025
	Mio Irisawa	(Japan)	15	JSSL Singapore		
	Fathimah Syaakirah	(Singapore)	4 September 2004 (age 21)	(Singapore) Hougang United FC	2025	2025
	Isabella Rose Edwards	(Australia)	15	(Singapore) Balestier Khalsa U13	2025	2025
	Syakirah Jumain	(Singapore)	24	(Singapore) Tiong Bahru FC	2025	2025
	Fatin Nur Syarafana Binte Alias	(Singapore)	28	(Singapore)	2025	2025
	Siti Asyura	(Singapore)	22	(Singapore)	2025	2025
	Ruby Alexandra Brooks	(Australia) (Philippines)	16	JSSL Singapore	2025	2025
	Maisarah Ramat	(Singapore)	32	(Singapore) Albirex Niigata FC (S)	2025	2025
	Zoey Chua	(Singapore)	18	(Singapore) Temasek Polytechnic	2024	2024
	Lucie Lefebvre	(France)	16	JSSL Singapore	2025	2025
	Nurmanissa Soria	(Singapore)	41	(Singapore) Police SA	2024	2025

== Coaching staff ==
Position	Name	Ref.
Chairman	(Japan) Shungo Sakamoto	
Vice-Chairman / Sporting Director	(Japan) Tadanari Lee	
General Manager	(Singapore) William Phang	
Men's Team
Interim SPL Head Coach SPL2 Head Coach Goalkeeping Coach	(Singapore) William Phang	
Fitness Coach	(Germany) Jens Eiberger	
Video Analyst	(Singapore) Nurhalis Azmi	
Club Doctor	(Singapore) Dr Dinesh Sirisena	
Sports Trainer	(Singapore) Danial Feriza (Singapore) Seishen Ratnagopal	
SYL U19 Head Coach	(Singapore) Robert Eziakor	
SYL U17 Head Coach	(Singapore) Azfar Zainal Abidin	
SYL U15 Head Coach	(Singapore) Rudy Benicio	
SYL U13 Head Coach	(Singapore) Faizal Zainuddin	
Physiotherapist	(Singapore) Nurul Ain Hassan (Singapore) Rahulpaskaran Shoban (Singapore) Isaac Tan (Singapore) Daniel Tan (Singapore) Calvin Chua (Singapore) Sarita Mok	
Logistics Officer	(Singapore) Goh Koon Hiang	
Women's Team
Team Manager	(Singapore) Syed Amirul Haziq	
Head Coach	(Singapore) Hafeez Shahni	
Assistant Coach	(Singapore) Irwan Shah (Singapore) Rudy Ali (Singapore) Azfar Zainal Abidin	
Sports Trainer	(Singapore) Vivian Eng	
Goalkeeper Coach	(Singapore) Tham Yong Jun	
Physiotherapist	(Singapore) Tan Junn Faye (Singapore) Tessa Seow (Singapore) Sarita Mok	

== Transfers ==
=== In ===
Preseason

Date (Note: Date of club's announcement, will be either date of club announcement or 1 Jun-2025, the date which the free agent start due to lapse of previous contract)	Position	Player	Transferred from	Ref
First team
1 June 2025	DF	(Singapore) Syahrul Sazali	(Japan) Albirex Niigata (S)	End of loan (Note: Syahrul Sazali moved back to Tanjong Pagar United after contract end.)
1 June 2025	MF	(Singapore) Syed Firdaus Hassan	(Japan) Albirex Niigata (S)	End of loan (Note: Syed Firdaus Hassan moved back to Albirex permanently after contract end.)
1 June 2025	MF	(Singapore) (Republic of Ireland) Jared Gallagher	(Singapore) Balestier Khalsa	End of loan (Note: Jared Gallagher moved back to Albirex after contract end.)
1 June 2025	MF	(Singapore) Rezza Rezky	(Singapore) Tanjong Pagar United	End of loan
1 June 2025	MF	(Singapore) Saifullah Akbar	(Singapore) Geylang International	End of loan
16 June 2025	MF	(Japan) Koya Kazama	(Japan) JEF United Chiba	Free; 2-years contract till 2027
21 June 2025	FW	(Malta) (Australia) Trent Buhagiar	(Azerbaijan) Kapaz	Undisclosed
25 June 2025	MF	(Japan) Seiga Sumi	(Japan) Fagiano Okayama	Season loan till June 2026
27 June 2025	FW	(Japan) Hide Higashikawa	(Japan) Tochigi City	Season loan till June 2026
29 June 2025	MF	(Singapore) (Denmark) Jacob Mahler	(Thailand) Muangthong United	Free
30 June 2025	GK	(Thailand) Nalawich Intacharoen	(Thailand) BG Pathum United	Season loan till June 2026
30 June 2025	FW	(Thailand) Witthawat Phraothaisong	(Thailand) BG Pathum United	Season loan till June 2026 (Note: Witthawat's loan extended for another year till Jun-26)
4 August 2025	DF	(Japan) Takeshi Yoshimoto	(Japan) FC Ryukyu	Free
28 August 2025	FW	(Japan) (Senegal) Talla Ndao	(Malta) Naxxar Lions	Free
U23
25 June 2025	MF	(Singapore) (India) Neel Manoj Nannat	(Singapore) SAFSA	End of NS
1 July 2025	GK	(Singapore) Danial Iliya	Free Agent	End of NS
1 July 2025	FW	(Singapore) Marc Ryan Tan	(Singapore)	Free
19 July 2025	FW	(Singapore) (Greece) Zikos Vasileios Chua	(Singapore) Geylang International	Free
24 July 2025	DF	(Singapore) Ryaan Sanizal	(Singapore) Young Lions	End of NS (Note: Ryaan left the club for Hougang United after returning from NS as his contract lapsed.)
5 August 2025	DF	(Singapore) Raoul Suhaimi	(Singapore) Young Lions	Free (Note: Raoul loaned back to YL till end of SEA Games)
5 August 2025	DF	(Singapore) Andrew Aw	(Singapore) Young Lions	End of NS (Note: Andrew loaned back to YL till end of SEA Games)
7 August 2025	MF	(Singapore) Rasul Ramli	(Singapore) Young Lions	Free
23 August 2025	GK	(Singapore) Addam Mikhail	(Singapore) Geylang International U15	U17
23 August 2025	MF	(India) Aaditya Aprameya Rao	(Singapore) Lion City Sailors U21	U17
23 August 2025	MF	(England) Hugh Alexander Lobsey	(Singapore) Lion City Sailors U17	U17
23 August 2025	FW	(Taiwan) Jasper Chen Hong-an	(Singapore) Lion City Sailors U17	U17
Women
25 July 2025	GK	(Singapore) Maisarah Ramat	Free Agent	N.A.
26 July 2025	DF	(Singapore) Nur Fathimah Syaakirah	(Singapore) Hougang United	Free
26 July 2025	MF	(Singapore) Nur Fitrizah	(Singapore) Tanjong Pagar United	Free
27 July 2025	FW	(Singapore) Fatin Syarafana	Free Agent	N.A.
11 August 2025	DF	(Singapore) Nur Sabrina	(Singapore) Geylang International	Free
12 August 2025	DF	(India) Ananya Pande	(Singapore) JSSL	Free
24 August 2025	FW	(Singapore) Siti Asyura	(Singapore)	Free

Mid-season

Date (Note: Date of club's announcement, will be either date of club announcement or 1 Jun-2025, the date which the free agent start due to lapse of previous contract)	Position	Player	Transferred To	Ref
First team
10 November 2025	MF	(Singapore) Iman Hakim	(Singapore) SAFSA	End of NS
17 November 2025	MF	(Singapore) (Indonesia) Matthias Josaphat Koesno	(Singapore) SAFSA	End of NS
1 January 2026	DF	(Singapore) Raoul Suhaimi	(Singapore) Young Lions	End of Loan (Note: Raoul loaned back to YL till end of SEA Games)
1 January 2026	MF	(Singapore) Ong Yu En	(Singapore) Young Lions	End of Loan
1 January 2026	FW	(Singapore) Lim Zheng Wu	(Singapore) SAFSA	Free
4 January 2026	MF	(Japan) Yuki Kobayashi	(Japan) Iwate Grulla Morioka	Free; 1.5 years contract till 2027
Academy
1 January 2026	MF	(Singapore) Rae Peh	(Singapore) Young Lions	End of Loan
Women
23 January 2026	GK	(Singapore) Nurul Haziqah	(Singapore) Lion City Sailors	Free
23 January 2026	GK	(United Kingdom) Beatrix Ong-Pratt	(Singapore) JSSL Youth	Free
23 January 2026	DF	(United States) Jia Samra	(Singapore) JSSL Youth	Free
23 January 2026	DF	(Canada) Kinley Melski	(Singapore) JSSL Youth	Free
23 January 2026	DF	(Singapore) Sophie Lee	(Singapore) JSSL Youth	Free
23 January 2026	DF	(Singapore) Erika Seah	(Singapore) JSSL Youth	Free
23 January 2026	MF	(United Kingdom) Maya Stephen	(Singapore) JSSL Youth	Free
23 January 2026	MF	(Canada) Mia Thomson	(Singapore) JSSL Youth	Free
23 January 2026	MF	(United Kingdom) Lucinda Ratcliffe	(Singapore) JSSL Youth	Free
23 January 2026	FW	(Canada) Cristina Clavel	(Singapore) JSSL Youth	Free
23 January 2026	FW	(United Kingdom) Victoria Hudson	(Singapore) JSSL Youth	Free

=== Out ===
Preseason

Date (Note: Date of club's announcement, will be either date of club announcement or 1 Jun-2025, the date which the free agent start due to lapse of previous contract)	Position	Player	Transferred To	Ref
First team
23 May 2025	MF	(Singapore) Yasir Hanapi	Retired	N.A.
1 June 2025	MF	(Thailand) Nanthiphat Chaiman	(Thailand) BG Pathum United U18	End of loan
1 June 2025	MF	(Japan) (Iran) Arya Igami Tarhani	(Japan) Albirex Niigata (S)	End of loan
1 June 2025	MF	(Singapore) Rezza Rezky	(Singapore)	Free
14 June 2025	GK	(Singapore) Ridhuan Barudin	(Singapore) Hougang United	Free
15 June 2025	FW	(Japan) Itsuki Enomoto	(Thailand) Chiangrai United	Free
18 June 2025	FW	(Japan) Seia Kunori	(Thailand) Bangkok United	Free
19 June 2025	MF	(Singapore) (Japan) Kyoga Nakamura	(Thailand) Bangkok United	Undisclosed
22 June 2025	MF	(Singapore) Syed Firdaus Hassan	(Japan) Albirex Niigata (S)	Free
27 June 2025	MF	(Singapore) (Republic of Ireland) Jared Gallagher	(Japan) Albirex Niigata (S)	Free
4 July 2025	DF	(Singapore) Syahrul Sazali	(Singapore) Tanjong Pagar United	Free
5 July 2025	GK	(Singapore) Sunny Tia Yang Guang	(Singapore) Tanjong Pagar United	Free
20 July 2025	DF	(Serbia) Miloš Zlatković	(Vietnam) Becamex HCM City FC	Free (Note: Miloš Zlatković signed an extension till end of 25–26 season before being released to join Becamex HCM City FC)
24 July 2025	DF	(Singapore) Ryaan Sanizal	(Singapore) Hougang United	Free
5 August 2025	DF	(Singapore) Raoul Suhaimi	(Singapore) Young Lions	Loan till Jan-26 (Note: Raoul loaned back to YL till end of SEA Games)
5 August 2025	DF	(Singapore) Andrew Aw	(Singapore) Young Lions	Loan till Jan-26 (Note: Andrew loaned back to YL till end of SEA Games)
5 August 2025	MF	(Singapore) Ong Yu En	(Singapore) Young Lions	Season loan
Academy
1 July 2025	DF	(Singapore) Ahmad Munthaha Sriwaluya	(Singapore) Geylang International	U21
1 July 2025	MF	(Singapore) Taras Goh Jun Xian	(Singapore)	U21
1 July 2025	MF	(Singapore) Arfan Rizq Naqi	(Singapore)	U17
1 July 2025	FW	(Singapore) Raoul Hadid S/O Akbar	(Singapore) Geylang International	U17
Women
10 July 2025	GK	(France) Lucie Lefebvre	(France)	
13 July 2025	MF	(Australia) (Philippines) Ruby Alexandra Brooks	(Australia)	
18 July 2025	DF	(Singapore) Zoey Chua	(Singapore) Hougang United FC	

Mid-season

Date (Note: Date of club's announcement, will be either date of club announcement or 1 Jun-2025, the date which the free agent start due to lapse of previous contract)	Position	Player	Transferred To	Ref
First team
6 January 2026	MF	(Singapore) Saifullah Akbar	(Singapore) Hougang United	Free
13 January 2026	DF	(Singapore) Amirul Adli	(Malaysia) Negeri Sembilan (M1)	On Loan till end of 2025/26 MSL Season
Academy
16 October 2025	MF	(Singapore) Rae Peh	(Singapore) Young Lions	U21. On loan till end of 2025 SEA Games
23 December 2025	GK	(Thailand) Nalawich Intacharoen	(Singapore) BG Pathum United (T1)	End of loan
26 December 2025	FW	(Thailand) Witthawat Phraothaisong	(Singapore) BG Pathum United (T1)	End of loan
31 December 2025	MF	(Singapore) Yusril Hanapi	(Singapore) Geylang International	Free
31 January 2026	MF	(Australia) (Singapore) Hugh Alexander Lobsey	(Singapore) Balestier Khalsa	Free
31 January 2026	DF	(Singapore) Loukas Ng Bo Jun	(Singapore) Balestier Khalsa	Free
1 Feb 2026	GK	(Singapore) Aniq Shayden		Free
Women
1 January 2026	GK	(Singapore) Maisarah Ramat	(Singapore) Tanjong Pagar United	Free (Left at the end of the 2025 WPL Season)
1 January 2026	DF	(India) Ananya Pande	(Singapore) Albirex Jurong	Free (Left at the end of the 2025 WPL Season)
1 January 2026	DF	(Singapore) Iffah Amrin	(Singapore) Hougang United	Free (Left at the end of the 2025 WPL Season)
1 January 2026	DF	(Singapore) Erlysha Qistina	(Singapore) Unity FC	Free (Left at the end of the 2025 WPL Season)
1 January 2026	DF	(Singapore) Anna Dulaki	(Singapore) Unity FC	Free (Left at the end of the 2025 WPL Season)
1 January 2026	MF	(Singapore) Anna Seng	(Singapore) Still Aerion WFC	Free (Left at the end of the 2025 WPL Season)
1 January 2026	MF	(Japan) Mio Irisawa	(Australia)	Free (Left at the end of the 2025 WPL Season)
1 January 2026	MF	(Singapore) Fathimah Syaakirah	(Singapore) Tanjong Pagar United	Free (Left at the end of the 2025 WPL Season)
1 January 2026	FW	(Australia) Isabella Rose Edwards	(Singapore) Still Aerion WFC	Free (Left at the end of the 2025 WPL Season)
1 January 2026	FW	(Singapore) Siti Asyura	(Singapore)	Free (Left at the end of the 2025 WPL Season)
1 January 2026	FW	(Singapore) Fatin Nur Syarafana	(Singapore) Hougang United	Free (Left at the end of the 2025 WPL Season)
1 January 2026	FW	(Singapore) Syakirah Jumain	(Singapore) Tanjong Pagar United FC	Free (Left at the end of the 2025 WPL Season)

=== National Services ===
Preseason

Date (Note: Date of club's announcement, else will be 1 Jun-2025, the date which the free agent start due to lapse of previous contract)	Position	Player	Transferred To	Ref
First team
U23
1 October 2024	DF	(Singapore) Jovan Ang	(Singapore) SAFSA	NS till November 2026
1 October 2024	MF	(Singapore) Caelan Cheong Tze Jay	(Singapore) SAFSA	NS till November 2026
1 October 2024	FW	(Singapore) (France) Nicolas Michael Beninger	(Singapore) SAFSA	NS till November 2026

=== Extension and retained ===
First Team

Position	Player	Ref
GK	(Singapore) Danial Iliya	1-year contract till 2023 (Note: Extended & loan to GYL during NS)
GK	(Singapore) Syazwan Buhari	2 years contract from 2021 till 2023
DF	(Singapore) Amirul Haikal	1-year contract till June 2026
DF	(Singapore) Irfan Najeeb	1-year contract till June 2026
DF	(Japan) Shuya Yamashita	1-year contract till June 2026
DF	(Australia) (Northern Ireland) Dylan Fox	1-year contract till June 2026
DF	(Serbia) Miloš Zlatković	1-year contract till June 2026
MF	(Singapore) Shah Shahiran	5 years contract from 2023 till 2027
MF	(Singapore) Joel Chew	5 years contract from 2023 till 2027
MF	(Singapore) Rezza Rezky	1-year contract till 2023
MF	(Singapore) Ong Yu En	3-years contract till 2025
MF	(Singapore) Iman Hakim	3 years contract till 2025
FW	(Singapore) Faris Ramli	1-year contract till June 2026
FW	(Singapore) (Indonesia) Taufik Suparno	1-year contract till June 2026

U21

Position	Player	Ref
GK	(Singapore) Jayden Khoo	1-year contract till 2023 (U21)
DF	(Singapore) Andrew Aw	3 years contract till 2025 (U21)
DF	(Singapore) (Bosnia and Herzegovina) Zeeshan Iskandar	1-year contract till 2023 (U21)
MF	(Singapore) Anton Yen Goh	1-year contract till 2023 (U21)
MF	(Singapore) (India) Neel Manoj Nannat	1-year contract till 2023 (U21)
MF	(Singapore) Yusril Hanapi	1-year contract till 2023 (U21)

== Friendlies ==
=== Pre-season ===
Win Draw Loss

18 July 2025 1	BG Tampines Rovers (Singapore)	4–3	(Singapore) Hougang United	Tampines
				Stadium: Our Tampines Hub

19 July 2025 2	Young Lions (Singapore)	0–1	(Singapore) BG Tampines Rovers	Kallang
				Stadium: Kallang Football Hub

8 August 2025 3	Albirex Niigata (S) (Japan)	1–0	(Singapore) BG Tampines Rovers	Jurong East
				Stadium: Jurong East Stadium

13 August 2025 4	BG Tampines Rovers (Singapore)	0–2	(Singapore) Lion City Sailors	Tampines
				Stadium: Our Tampines Hub

5 September 2025 5	Johor Darul Ta'zim II (Malaysia)	2–5	(Singapore) BG Tampines Rovers	Johor
				Stadium: Tan Sri Dato' Haji Hassan Yunos Stadium

Thailand Tour (22–31 July)

24 July 2025 1	North Bangkok University FC (Thailand)	1–2	(Singapore) BG Tampines Rovers	Pathum Thani
				Stadium: Yamaoka Hanasaka Academy

26 July 2025 2	Kasetsart FC (Thailand)	2–2	(Singapore) BG Tampines Rovers	Pathum Thani
				Stadium: Yamaoka Hanasaka Academy

30 July 2025 3	Chiangrai United (Thailand)	4–3	(Singapore) BG Tampines Rovers	Pathum Thani
	Lee Seung-won; Ongsa Singthong; Nanthiphat Chaiman; Itsuki Enomoto		Hide Higashikawa; Seiga Sumi; Shah Shahiran (pen.)	Stadium: Yamaoka Hanasaka Academy

=== In-season ===
20 September 2025 1	BG Tampines Rovers (Singapore)	0–2	(Singapore) Hougang United	Tampines
				Stadium: Our Tampines Hub

== Team statistics ==
=== Appearances and goals ===
As of 17 May 26

No.	Pos.	Player	SPL		Singapore Cup		Community Shield		AFC Champions League Two		AFF Shopee Cup		Total	
No.	Pos.	Player	Apps.	Goals	Apps.	Goals	Apps.	Goals	Apps.	Goals	Apps.	Goals	Apps.	Goals
2	DF	(Singapore) Raoul Suhaimi	9+5	0	1	0	0	0	1+1	0	1	0	18	0
4	DF	(Japan) Shuya Yamashita	20	1	3	0	1	0	10	0	5	0	39	1
6	MF	(Singapore) (Denmark) Jacob Mahler	11+6	3	0	0	0+1	0	4+5	0	0+5	0	32	3
7	MF	(Japan) Seiga Sumi	15+5	1	3	1	1	0	9+1	0	5	0	39	2
8	MF	(Singapore) Shah Shahiran	20+1	5	0	0	1	0	10	0	5	0	37	5
10	FW	(Singapore) Faris Ramli	0+2	1	1+2	0	0	0	1+4	1	0+1	0	11	2
11	FW	(Singapore) Glenn Kweh	12+6	5	2+1	0	1	0	6+4	1	4+1	0	37	6
12	FW	(Malta) (Australia) Trent Buhagiar	14+5	6	3	1	1	2	9+1	8	4+1	2	38	19
13	FW	(Singapore) (Indonesia) Taufik Suparno	3+12	0	0+3	0	1	0	1+5	0	1+3	1	29	1
15	MF	(Singapore) Ong Yu En	0+4	1	0+1	0	0	0	0	0	0+1	0	6	1
16	DF	(Australia) (Northern Ireland) Dylan Fox	7+2	0	0+1	0	1	0	5+3	0	4	1	23	1
17	DF	(Singapore) Amirul Haikal	4+3	0	0	0	0	0	1+1	0	0+1	0	10	0
18	FW	(Singapore) (Greece) Zikos Vasileios Chua	1+6	1	0	0	0	0	0+1	0	0+1	0	9	1
19	MF	(Singapore) Joel Chew	9+11	0	3	1	0+1	0	2+5	0	1+4	0	36	1
23	DF	(Singapore) Irfan Najeeb	16+3	2	3	0	1	0	7+1	0	3+2	0	36	2
24	GK	(Singapore) Syazwan Buhari	19	0	3	0	0	0	7	0	5	0	34	0
25	FW	(Japan) Hide Higashikawa	19+1	19	3	1	0+1	0	8+1	6	5	5	38	31
26	DF	(Japan) Takeshi Yoshimoto	17+3	1	3	0	1	0	9+1	2	5	0	39	3
44	GK	(Singapore) Danial Iliya	0+1	0	0	0	0	0	0	0	0	0	1	0
47	MF	(Singapore) (Indonesia) Matthias Josaphat Koesno	0	0	0	0	0	0	0	0	0	0	0	0
49	MF	(Japan) Yuki Kobayashi	14+2	2	0+1	0	0	0	3+1	0	0	0	21	2
50	FW	(Japan) (Brazil) Tallo Ngao	0+7	0	0+2	1	0	0	2+4	0	0+1	0	16	1
55	DF	(Singapore) Kegan Phang Jun	0+2	0	0+1	0	0	0	0+1	0	0	0	4	0
60	GK	(United States) (Singapore) Kasey Rogers	1	0	0	0	0	0	2	0	0	0	3	0
76	MF	(Singapore) Rae Peh	0	0	0	0	0	0	0	0	0	0	0	0
80	MF	(Singapore) Kieran Tan	0	0	0	0	0	0	0	0	0	0	0	0
88	MF	(Japan) Koya Kazama	19+2	7	3	0	1	1	8+1	2	4+1	1	39	11
Players who have played this season and/or sign for the season but had left the club or on loan to other club
5	DF	(Singapore) Amirul Adli	0+3	0	2	0	0+1	0	4+1	0	2+1	0	14	0
20	MF	(Singapore) Saifullah Akbar	0+2	0	0	0	0	0	0+1	0	1+1	0	5	0
49	GK	(Thailand) Nalawich Intacharoen	0	0	0	0	1	0	1	0	0	0	2	0
69	FW	(Thailand) Witthawat Phraothaisong	0	0	0	0	0	0	0	0	0	0	0	0

== Competitions ==
=== Overview ===
Competition	First match	Last match	Starting round	Final position	Record							
Competition	First match	Last match	Starting round	Final position	Pld	W	D	L	GF	GA	GD	Win %
Singapore Premier League	24 August 2025		Matchday 1		14	10	3	1	39	12	+27	71.43
Singapore Community Shield	16 August 2025		Final	Winners	1	1	0	0	4	1	+3	100.00
Singapore Cup	14 December 2025	10 January 2026	Semi-finals	Runners-up	3	1	0	2	5	5	+0	33.33
AFC Champions League Two	18 September 2025	12 March 2026	Group stage	Quarter-finals	10	7	2	1	23	10	+13	70.00
ASEAN Club Championship	20 August 2025	4 February 2026	Group stage	Group stage	5	2	0	3	10	17	−7	40.00
Total					33	21	5	7	81	45	+36	63.64

Last updated: 4 April 2026
Source: Competitions

=== Community Shield ===
16 August 2025 Community Shield	Lion City Sailors (Singapore)	1–4	(Singapore) BG Tampines Rovers	Jurong East
	Lennart Thy 87'; Diogo Costa (yellow card) 79'	Report	Trent Buhagiar 2', 42'; Koya Kazama 61'; Hide Higashikawa 90+1'	Stadium: Jurong East Stadium; Referee: Farhan Mohd

=== Singapore Premier League ===
Win Draw Loss

24 August 2025 1	BG Tampines Rovers (Singapore)	0–0	(Singapore) Geylang International	Tampines
	Taufik Suparno (yellow card) 84'	Report	Shakir Hamzah (yellow card) 54'	Stadium: Our Tampines Hub; Referee: Muhammad Taqi; Man of the Match: (Japan) Riku Fukashiro

13 September 2025 2	Tanjong Pagar United (Singapore)	0–3	(Singapore) BG Tampines Rovers	Jurong East
	Raihan Rahman (yellow card) 59'; Youssef Ezzejjari (yellow card) 88'; Guilherme Rodrigues (yellow card) 89'; Zenivio (yellow card) 90+4'	Report	Takeshi Yoshimoto 43'; Glenn Kweh 48'; Koya Kazama 86'	Stadium: Jurong East Stadium; Referee: Clarence Leow; Man of the Match: (Japan) Seiga Sumi

30 April 2026 3 (Rescheduled)	Albirex Niigata (S) (Japan)	2–1	(Singapore) BG Tampines Rovers	Jurong East
	Shingo Nakano 45'; Abdul Rasaq 62' (yellow card) 6'; Jaden Heng (yellow card) 90+3'		Trent Buhagiar 45+1'; Koya Kazama (yellow card) 35'	Stadium: Jurong East Stadium; Referee: Muhammad Taqi

19 October 2025 4	BG Tampines Rovers (Singapore)	3–3	(Singapore) Balestier Khalsa	Tampines
	Hide Higashikawa 6'; Glenn Kweh 48', 79'; Takeshi Yoshimoto (yellow card) 73'	Report	Masahiro Sugita 18' (yellow card) 90+1'; Madhu Mohana 70'; Tin Matić 90+17' (pen.); Harith Kanadi (yellow card) 36'	Stadium: Our Tampines Hub; Referee: Farhan Mohd; Man of the Match: (Singapore) Glenn Kweh

27 October 2025 5 (Rescheduled)	Hougang United (Singapore)	1–2	(Singapore) BG Tampines Rovers	Tampines
	Syazwan Buhari 86' (o.g.); Ryaan Sanizal (yellow card) 66'; Jordan Vestering (yellow card) 79'	Report	Faris Ramli 78'; Irfan Najeeb 90+4'; Shuya Yamashita (yellow card) 69'	Stadium: Our Tampines Hub; Referee: Jansen Foo; Man of the Match: (Singapore) Faris Ramli

17 May 2026 6 (Rescheduled)	BG Tampines Rovers (Singapore)	3–2	(Singapore) Lion City Sailors	Tampines
	Jacob Mahler 57'; Yuki Kobayashi 75'; Hide Higashikawa 78'; Koya Kazama (yellow card) 80' (yellow-red card) 83'	Report	Song Ui-young 50'; Lennart Thy 59'; Kyoga Nakamura (yellow card) 9'; Bailey Wright (yellow card) 63'; Hami Syahin (yellow card) 90+5'	Stadium: Our Tampines Hub; Referee: Mazlan Pagira; Man of the Match: (Japan) Yuki Kobayashi

16 January 2026 7	BG Tampines Rovers (Singapore)	7–1	(Singapore) Young Lions	Tampines
	Hide Higashikawa 8', 38', 72', 76'; Koya Kazama 29', 30'; Glenn Kweh 45+1'; Seiga Sumi (yellow card) 45+5'; Shah Shahiran (yellow card) 49'; Jacob Mahler (yellow card) 74'	Report	Abner Vinicius 10'; Izwan Mahbud (red card) 21'; Harith Danish Irwan (yellow card) 68'	Stadium: Our Tampines Hub; Referee: Clarence Leow; Man of the Match: (Japan) Hide Higashikawa

23 January 2026 8	Geylang International (Singapore)	1–3	(Singapore) BG Tampines Rovers	Tampines
	Ryoya Taniguchi 74'	Report	Nikola Ignjatovic 20' (o.g.); Trent Buhagiar 54', 59'; Irfan Najeeb (yellow card) 51'; Koya Kazama (yellow card) 76'	Stadium: Our Tampines Hub; Referee: Mazlan Pagira; Man of the Match: (Malta) (Australia) Trent Buhagiar

31 January 2026 9	BG Tampines Rovers (Singapore)	2–1	(Singapore) Tanjong Pagar United	Tampines
	Hide Higashikawa 6'; Shah Shahiran 35'; Shuya Yamashita (yellow card) 80'	Report	Emilio Estevez 65'; Kim Li-Kwan (yellow card) 33'; Noh Alam Shah (yellow card) 84'	Stadium: Our Tampines Hub; Referee: Thawfeek Ahamad; Man of the Match: (Singapore) Shah Shahiran

7 February 2026 10	Balestier Khalsa (Singapore)	0–3	(Singapore) BG Tampines Rovers	Bishan
	Fudhil I'yadh (yellow card) 37'; Tin Matic (yellow card) 49'; Lazar Vujanic (yellow card) 70'	Report	Shah Shahiran 22'; Hide Higashikawa 50'; Jacob Mahler 71' (yellow card) 45+3'; Trent Buhagiar (yellow card) 89'	Stadium: Bishan Stadium; Referee: Clarence Leow; Man of the Match: (Singapore) Shah Shahiran

14 February 2026 11	BG Tampines Rovers (Singapore)	2–1	(Japan) Albirex Niigata (S)	Tampines
	Hide Higashikawa 29', 45+1'; Jacob Mahler (yellow card) 36'	Report	Shingo Nakano 76' (yellow card) 27'	Stadium: Our Tampines Hub; Referee: Mazlan Pagira; Man of the Match: (Japan) Hide Higashikawa

22 February 2026 12	Lion City Sailors (Singapore)	1–1	(Singapore) BG Tampines Rovers	Jalan Besar
	Lennart Thy 22'; Kyoga Nakamura (yellow card) 37'; Rui Pires (yellow card) 77'; Bart Ramselaar (yellow card) 90+4'	Report	Koya Kazama 44'	Stadium: Jalan Besar Stadium; Referee: Jansen Foo; Man of the Match: (Japan) Koya Kazama

27 February 2026 13	BG Tampines Rovers (Singapore)	3–0	(Singapore) Hougang United	Tampines
	Hide Higashikawa 48'; Koya Kazama 64'; Trent Buhagiar 90+6' (yellow card) 72'	Report	Settawut Wongsai (red card) 45+5'; Nabilai Kibunguchy (yellow card) 90+4'	Stadium: Our Tampines Hub; Referee: Ahmad A'Qashah; Man of the Match: (Malta) (Australia) Trent Buhagiar

8 March 2026 14 (Rescheduled)	Young Lions (Singapore)	0–5	(Singapore) BG Tampines Rovers	Jalan Besar
		Report	Shuya Yamashita 14'; Hide Higashikawa 39'; Glenn Kweh 45+7' (pen.); Koya Kazama 59'; Zikos Vasileios Chua 68'	Stadium: Jalan Besar Stadium; Referee: Hilmi Fuad

16 March 2026 15	Tanjong Pagar United (Singapore)	0–3	(Singapore) BG Tampines Rovers	Jurong East
	Junior Djile (yellow card) 42'; Sahil Suhaimi (yellow card) 45+7'; Kim Ri-gwan (yellow card) 64'	Report	Hide Higashikawa 20', 76'; Shah Shahiran 90'; Amirul Haikal (yellow card) 70'	Stadium: Jurong East Stadium; Referee: Ahmad A'Qashah; Man of the Match: (Japan) Hide Higashikawa

4 April 2026 16	Albirex Niigata (S) (Japan)	3–2	(Singapore) BG Tampines Rovers	Jurong East
	Ryang Hyon-ju 39' (pen.); Shingo Nakano 61'; Abdul Rasaq 86'; Kim Tae-uk (yellow card) 52'	Report	Trent Buhagiar 4'; Hide Higashikawa 7'; Shah Shahiran (yellow card) 90+5'	Stadium: Jurong East Stadium; Referee: Hilmi Fuad; Man of the Match: (Singapore) (Nigeria) Abdul Rasaq

11 April 2026 17	BG Tampines Rovers (Singapore)	4–3	(Singapore) Geylang International	Tampines
	Hide Higashikawa 5', 12', 90+7'; Jacob Mahler 90+5'; Yuki Kobayashi (yellow card) 79'	Report	Kaisei Ogawa 21'; Shodai Yokoyama 29'; Shuhei Hoshino 47'; Shahdan Sulaiman (yellow card) 75'; Rudy Khairullah (yellow card) 90+3'	Stadium: Our Tampines Hub; Referee: Mazlan Pagira; Man of the Match: (Japan) Hide Higashikawa

17 April 2026 18	BG Tampines Rovers (Singapore)	2–1	(Singapore) Balestier Khalsa	Tampines
	Yuki Kobayashi 48'; Seiga Sumi 80'; Jacob Mahler (yellow card) 63'	Report	Daniel Goh 64'; Mario Subarić (yellow card) 46'; Lazar Vujanić (yellow card) 79'; Tin Matić (yellow card) 89'	Stadium: Our Tampines Hub; Referee: Oswind Suriya; Man of the Match: (Croatia) Mario Mustapić

24 April 2026 19	BG Tampines Rovers (Singapore)	8–1	(Singapore) Young Lions	Tampines
	Trent Buhagiar 4' (yellow card) 43'; Irfan Najeeb 23'; Shah Shahiran 28', 78'; Koya Kazama 33'; Glenn Kweh 80'; Ong Yu En 88'; Hide Higashikawa 90+6'	Report	Sergio Mendonça 31'; Marcus Mosses (red card) 46'	Stadium: Our Tampines Hub; Referee: Farhan Mohd; Man of the Match: (Singapore) Shah Shahiran

3 May 2026 20 (Rescheduled)	BG Tampines Rovers (Singapore)	0–0	(Singapore) Lion City Sailors	Tampines
		Report	Christopher van Huizen (yellow card) 37'; Jesús Casas (yellow card) 55'; Rui Pires (yellow card) 61'; Ivan Susak (yellow card) 90+5'	Stadium: Our Tampines Hub; Referee: Ahmad A'Qashah; Man of the Match: (Japan) Seiga Sumi

10 May 2026 21	Hougang United (Singapore)	0–1	(Singapore) BG Tampines Rovers	Bishan
	Jordan Vestering (yellow card) 39'; Ryaan Sanizal (red card) 51'; Victor Blasco (red card) 70'; Anders Aplin (yellow card) 90'		Saifullah Akbar 82' (o.g.); Trent Buhagiar (yellow card) 43'; Shuya Yamashita (yellow card) 65'	Stadium: Bishan Stadium; Referee: Jansen Foo; Man of the Match: (Singapore) Ridhuan Barudin

Pos	Team	Pld	W	D	L	GF	GA	GD	Pts	Qualification or relegation
1	Lion City Sailors (C)	21	16	3	2	70	14	+56	51	Qualification for the AFC Champions League Two (Note: As league champions Lion City Sailors also won the 2025–26 Singapore Cup, the continental place allocated to the cup winners passed to league runners-up BG Tampines Rovers.)
2	BG Tampines Rovers	21	15	4	2	58	21	+37	49	Qualification for the AFC Champions League Two
3	Albirex Niigata (S)	21	15	2	4	47	19	+28	47	
4	Balestier Khalsa	21	11	2	8	44	46	−2	35	
5	Geylang International	21	7	3	11	29	42	−13	24	
6	Hougang United	21	7	0	14	24	41	−17	21	
7	Young Lions (Note: Young Lions were not eligible to qualify for AFC club competitions.)	21	2	3	16	15	58	−43	9	
8	Tanjong Pagar United	21	2	1	18	17	63	−46	7	

Source: Singapore Premier League
Rules for classification: 1) Points; 2) goal difference; 3) goals scored; 4) wins
(C) Champions

=== Singapore Cup ===
==== Semi Final ====
14 December 2025 Semi Final Leg 1	Albirex Niigata (S) (Japan)	0–4	(Singapore) BG Tampines Rovers	Jurong East
	Haziq Kamarudin (yellow card) 60'; Takumi Yokohata (yellow card) 71'		Hide Higashikawa 56'; Joel Chew 76'; Trent Buhagiar 85'; Tallo Ngao 90+3'; Amirul Adli (yellow card) 45+3'	Stadium: Jurong East Stadium; Referee: Farhan Mohd; Man of the Match: (Japan) Hide Higashikawa

20 December 2025 Semi Final Leg 2	BG Tampines Rovers (Singapore)	1–3 (5–3 agg.)	(Japan) Albirex Niigata (S)	Tampines
	Seiga Sumi 55'; Amirul Adli (yellow card) 71'		Nozomi Ozawa 18'; Shingo Nakano 43' (yellow card) 78'; Kim Tae-uk (yellow card) 27'	Stadium: Our Tampines Hub; Referee: Clarence Leow; Man of the Match: (Japan) Nozomi Ozawa

Tampines Rovers won 5–3 on aggregate.

==== Final ====
10 January 2026 Final	Lion City Sailors (Singapore)	3–0; Awarded (Note: The match, originally won by Lion City Sailors 2–0 after extra time, was forfeited by Tampines Rovers and awarded 3–0 to Lion City Sailors, as Tampines fielded more than the allowed number of foreigners) (a.e.t.)	(Singapore) BG Tampines Rovers	Jalan Besar
	Hami Syahin 115'; Anderson Lopes 120+2'; Shawal Anuar (yellow card) 34'			Stadium: Jalan Besar Stadium; Attendance: 3,767; Referee: Adam Kersey (Australia); Man of the Match: Bailey Wright

=== AFC Champions League Two ===
==== Group stage ====
Pos	Team	Pld	W	D	L	GF	GA	GD	Pts	Qualification	BGT	PHS	BGP	KAY
1	(Singapore) Tampines Rovers	6	5	1	0	14	5	+9	16	Advance to round of 16	—	1–0	2–1	5–3
2	(South Korea) Pohang Steelers	6	4	1	1	7	2	+5	13	Advance to round of 16	1–1	—	2–0	2–0
3	(Thailand) BG Pathum United	6	2	0	4	5	8	−3	6		0–2	0–1	—	2–1
4	(Philippines) Kaya–Iloilo	6	0	0	6	4	15	−11	0		0–3	0–1	0–2	—

Source: ACL2
Rules for classification: Tiebreakers

18 September 2025 1	Kaya–Iloilo (Philippines)	0–3	(Singapore) BG Tampines Rovers	Capas, Philippines
	Magnus Ravn (yellow card) 90+2'	Report	Trent Buhagiar 46', 73'; Takeshi Yoshimoto 52'; Koya Kazama (yellow card) 78'	Stadium: New Clark City Athletics Stadium; Attendance: 120; Referee: Ahmed Faisal Al-Ali (Jordan)

2 October 2025 2	BG Tampines Rovers (Singapore)	2–1	(Thailand) BG Pathum United	Bishan, Singapore
	Trent Buhagiar 42'; Hide Higashikawa 58'; Tallo Ngao (yellow card) 75'; Joel Chew (yellow card) 89'	Report	Sanchai Nontasila (yellow card) 56'	Stadium: Bishan Stadium; Attendance: 699; Referee: Bijan Heydari (Iran)

23 October 2025 3	BG Tampines Rovers (Singapore)	1–0	(South Korea) Pohang Steelers	Bishan, Singapore
	Hide Higashikawa 1'; Tallo Ngao (yellow card) 90+1'	Report	Jonathan Aspropotamitis (yellow card) 17'; Hwang Seo-woong (yellow card) 52'; Lee Dong-hee (yellow card) 65'; Cho Sang-hyeok (yellow card) 90+3'	Stadium: Bishan Stadium; Attendance: 887; Referee: Zaid Thamer Mohammed (Iraq)

6 November 2025 4	Pohang Steelers (South Korea)	1–1	(Singapore) BG Tampines Rovers	Pohang, South Korea
	Cho Sang-hyeok 85'; Kim Dong-jin (yellow card) 39'; Cho Jae-hun (yellow card) 83'	Report	Glenn Kweh 56'; Irfan Najeeb (yellow card) 42'; Tallo Ngao (yellow card) 90+5'	Stadium: Pohang Steel Yard; Attendance: 2,553; Referee: Akaml Buriev (Tajikistan)

27 November 2025 5	BG Tampines Rovers (Singapore)	5–3	(Philippines) Kaya–Iloilo	Bishan, Singapore
	Hide Higashikawa 7', 56'; Takeshi Yoshimoto 37'; Trent Buhagiar 47'; Faris Ramli 86'; Seiga Sumi (yellow card) 18'; Irfan Najeeb (yellow card) 29'	Report	Mike Ott 66'; Paolo Bugas 75'; Amirul Adli 85' (o.g.); Martini Rey (yellow card) 26'	Stadium: Bishan Stadium; Attendance: 1,069; Referee: Ahmad Yacoub Ibrahim (Jordan)

11 December 2025 6	BG Pathum United (Thailand)	0–2	(Singapore) BG Tampines Rovers	Pathum Thani, Thailand
	Sarach Yooyen (yellow card) 73'	Report	Koya Kazama 78'; Trent Buhagiar 85'; Glenn Kweh (yellow card) 72'	Stadium: True BG Stadium; Referee: Yahya Al-Mulla (United Arab Emirates)

==== Knockout stage ====
11 February 2026 Rd of 16 Leg 1	Cong An Hanoi FC (Vietnam)	0–3; Awarded (Note: The Cong An Hanoi v BG Tampines Rovers first leg, originally won 4–0 by Cong An Hanoi, was forfeited and awarded 3–0 to BG Tampines by the AFC Disciplinary Committee on 17 Feb 2026, as Cong An Hanoi fielded Stefan Mauk and Rogério Alves, even though they were suspended.)	(Singapore) BG Tampines Rovers	Hanoi, Vietnam
	Nguyễn Quang Hải 24', 27'; China 37'; Nguyen Dình Bac 90+2'; Filip Nguyen (yellow card) 90'	Report		Stadium: Hàng Đẫy Stadium; Attendance: 3,186; Referee: Zaid Thamer Mohammed (Iraq)

18 February 2026 Rd of 16 Leg 2	BG Tampines Rovers (Singapore)	3–1 (6–1 agg.)	(Vietnam) Cong An Hanoi FC	Jalan Besar, Singapore
	Hide Higashikawa 36', 60'; Trent Buhagiar 79'; Koya Kazama (yellow card) 45+3'; Takeshi Yoshimoto (yellow card) 45+4'; Yuki Kobayashi (yellow card) 69'	Report	Alan Grafite 77' (pen.) (yellow card) 34'; Léo Artur (red card) 52'; Lê Văn Đô (yellow card) 90+6'	Stadium: Jalan Besar Stadium; Attendance: 1,701; Referee: Kim Yu-jeong (South Korea)

5 March 2026 Quarter Final Leg 1	Bangkok United (Thailand)	2–1	(Singapore) BG Tampines Rovers	Pathum Thani, Thailand
	Nebojša Kosović 11'; Picha Autra 18'; Philipe Maia (yellow card) 49' (yellow-red card) 81'; Patiwat Khammai (yellow card) 90+8'	Report	Trent Buhagiar 80'	Stadium: True BG Stadium; Attendance: 1,153; Referee: Ryo Tanimoto (Japan)

12 March 2026 Quarter Final Leg 2	BG Tampines Rovers (Singapore)	2–2 (3–4 agg.)	(Thailand) Bangkok United	Jalan Besar, Singapore
	Trent Buhagiar 39'; Koya Kazama 72'; Irfan Najeeb (yellow card) 31'	Report	Teerasil Dangda 16'; Ilias Alhaft 42'; Everton (yellow card) 20'; Wanchai Jarunongkran (yellow card) 82'; Suphan Thongsong (yellow card) 89'	Stadium: Jalan Besar Stadium; Attendance: 1,350; Referee: Wang Di (China)

=== ASEAN Club Championship ===
==== Group stage ====
Pos	Team	Pld	W	D	L	GF	GA	GD	Pts	Qualification	BRU	SEL	BGP	CAH	BGT	DHC
1	(Thailand) Buriram United	5	2	3	0	14	5	+9	9	Advance to knockout stage	—	1–1	—	1–1	—	6–0
2	(Malaysia) Selangor	5	2	3	0	9	5	+4	9	Advance to knockout stage	—	—	1–1	2–0	4–2	—
3	(Thailand) BG Pathum United	5	2	2	1	9	7	+2	8		2–2	—	—	2–1	—	2–0
4	(Vietnam) Công An Hà Nội	5	2	1	2	9	6	+3	7		—	—	—	—	6–1	1–0
5	(Singapore) Tampines Rovers	5	2	0	3	10	17	−7	6		1–4	—	3–2	—	—	—
6	(Philippines) Dynamic Herb Cebu	5	0	1	4	2	13	−11	1		—	1–1	—	—	1–3	—

Source: ASEAN United FC
Rules for classification: Tiebreakers

20 August 2025 1	DH Cebu (Philippines)	1–3	(Singapore) BG Tampines Rovers	Manila, Philippines
	Abou Sy 22'; Daniel Gadia (yellow card) 34'	Report	Hide Higashikawa 2'; Dylan Fox 19' (yellow card) 72'; Trent Buhagiar 90+7'; Seiga Sumi (yellow card) 68'	Stadium: Rizal Memorial Stadium; Attendance: 803; Referee: Wiwat Jumpaoon (Thailand); Man of the Match: (Australia) Dylan Fox

25 September 2025 2	Selangor (Malaysia)	4–2	(Singapore) BG Tampines Rovers	Shah Alam, Malaysia
	Shuya Yamashita 18' (o.g.); Zach Clough 30'; Faisal Halim 51'; Alvin Fortes 58' (yellow card) 90+5'	Report	Koya Kazama 41' (pen.); Hide Higashikawa 65'; Taufik Suparno (yellow card) 80'	Stadium: Shah Alam Stadium; Attendance: 1,815; Referee: Omar Al-Yaqoubi (Oman)

3 December 2025 3	BG Tampines Rovers (Singapore)	3–2	(Thailand) BG Pathum United	Jalan Besar, Singapore
	Hide Higashikawa 45+3', 61', 78'; Shah Shairan (penalty missed) 11; Irfan Najeeb (yellow card) 30'	Report	Tomoyuki Doi 7'; Raniel 27'; Sarach Yooyen (yellow card) 66'; Ekanit Panya (yellow card) 77'	Stadium: Jalan Besar Stadium; Attendance: 1,009; Referee: Ahmed Al-Ali (Jordan)

28 January 2026 4	BG Tampines Rovers (Singapore)	1–4	(Thailand) Buriram United	Bishan, Singapore
	Taufik Suparno 90+1'; Trent Buhagiar (yellow card) 83'	Report	Suphanat Mueanta 32'; Guilherme Bissoli 52', 70' (pen.); Goran Čaušić 88'	Stadium: Bishan Stadium; Attendance: 908; Referee: Koji Takasaki (Japan)

4 February 2026 5	Cong An Hanoi FC (Vietnam)	6–1	(Singapore) BG Tampines Rovers	Hanoi, Vietnam
	Hugo Gomes 15'; Lê Văn Đô 28'; Phan Văn Đức 32'; Vitão 75'; Alan Grafite 83', 90'	Report	Trent Buhagiar 12'	Stadium: Hàng Đẫy Stadium; Referee: Chae Sang-hyeop (South Korea)

== Competition (SPL2) ==
Win Draw Loss

22 December 2025 1 (Rescheduled)	Albirex Niigata (S) (Japan)	0–1	(Singapore) BG Tampines Rovers	Jurong East
	Liska Iskandar (yellow card) 75'; Delwinder Singh (yellow card) 90'; Jaden Heng (yellow card) 90+5'		Witthawat Phraothaisong 5' (yellow card) 78'; Matthias Koesno (yellow card) 90+5'; Kegan Phant (yellow card) 90+5'	Stadium: Jurong East Stadium; Referee: Mazlan Pagira

10 September 2025 2	BG Tampines Rovers (Singapore)	2–1	(Singapore) Lion City Sailors	Tampines
	Faris Ramli 32'; Tallo Ngao 78'		Namsang Rai 70'; Faisal Shahril (yellow card) 68'	Stadium: Our Tampines Hub; Referee: Andrea Verolino

29 September 2025 3	BG Tampines Rovers (Singapore)	1–3	(Singapore) Tanjong Pagar United	Jurong East
	Kegan Phang 55'; Witthawat Phraothaisong (yellow card) 57'		Risvi Aaqil 10', 15', 30'; Emmeric Ong (yellow card) 44'; Aloysius Pang (yellow card) 56'; Syahrul Sazali (yellow card) 90+4'	Stadium: Jurong East Stadium; Referee: Taufik Thana

2 March 2026 4 (Rescheduled)	Geylang International (Singapore)	1–2	(Singapore) BG Tampines Rovers	Tampines
	Timothy Cheng 51' (pen.); Danial Scott Crichton (yellow card) 39'; Raiyan Noor (yellow card) 59'		Marc Ryan Tan 37'; Qylfie Ryan 79'; Caden Lim (yellow card) 43'; Matthias Koesno (yellow card) 85' (yellow-red card) 90'	Stadium: Our Tampines Hub; Referee: Oswind Suriya

15 October 2025 5	BG Tampines Rovers (Singapore)	1–0	(Singapore) Balestier Khalsa	Tampines
	Tallo Ngao 18'; Liam Buckley (yellow card) 59'; Shaddiq Mansor (yellow card) 73'			Stadium: Our Tampines Hub; Referee: Yazid Abdul Latiff

29 October 2025 6	Hougang United (Singapore)	0–2	(Singapore) BG Tampines Rovers	Choa Chu Kang
	Rauf Sanizal (yellow card) 12'; Adam Ali (yellow card) 65'; Ganesan Silloren (red card) 76'; Syady Sufwan (yellow card) 82'		Shafrel Ariel 27'; Tallo Ngao 62'; Kegan Phang (yellow card) 76'	Stadium: Choa Chu Kang Stadium; Referee: Thawfeek Ahamad

10 November 2025 7	Young Lions (Singapore)	4–2	(Singapore) BG Tampines Rovers	Bishan
	Nicolas Benninger 68'; Shafrel Ariel 75' (o.g.); Abner Vinicius 78' (yellow card) 58'; Sérgio Mendonça 80'; Ikram Mikhail Mustaqim (yellow card) 83'		Tallo Ngao 42', 47'; Sky Yeo (yellow card) 60'; Shafrel Ariel (yellow card) 63'; Nalawich Inthacharoen (yellow card) 66'; Kegan Phang (yellow card) 70'	Stadium: Bishan Stadium; Referee: Khairul Amri

18 November 2025 8	BG Tampines Rovers (Singapore)	2–2	(Japan) Albirex Niigata (S)	Jurong East
	Witthawat Phraothaisong 26'; Zikos Vasileios Chua 64' (yellow card) 71'; Matthias Koesno (yellow card) 89'		Amy Recha 45'; Syukri Bashir 87'; Aqil Zafri (yellow card) 25'; Khaalish Aaqil (yellow card) 41'; Liska Iskandar (yellow card) 90'	Stadium: Jurong East Stadium; Referee: Noor Adzdzeeq

4 December 2025 9 (Rescheduled)	BG Tampines Rovers (Singapore)	2–3	(Singapore) Young Lions	Tampines
	Tallo Ngao 26', 37'; Kegan Phang (yellow card) 45'; Witthawat Phraothaisong (yellow card) 52'; Ilham Iskandar (yellow card) 65'; Shaddiq Mansor (yellow card) 90'			Stadium: Our Tampines Hub; Referee: Thawfeek Ahamad

15 December 2025 10	Tanjong Pagar United (Singapore)	4–3	(Singapore) BG Tampines Rovers	Jurong East
	Youssef Ezzejjari 20', 36', 52', 65'; Erfan Azhar (yellow card) 29'; Danish Haqimi (yellow card) 82'; Samuel Pillai (yellow card) 90'		Zikos Chua 23'; Talla Ndao 30', 89'	Stadium: Jurong East Stadium; Referee: Taufik Thana

6 January 2026 11	BG Tampines Rovers (Singapore)	1–1	(Singapore) Geylang International	Tampines
	Faris Ramli 18'; Caden Lim (yellow card) 24'; Lim Zheng Wu (yellow card) 88'		Amy Recha 53'; Ryu Hardy (yellow card) 8'; Prince Rio Rifae'i (yellow card) 26'	Stadium: Our Tampines Hub; Referee: Khairul Amri

14 January 2026 12	Balestier Khalsa (Singapore)	2–1	(Singapore) BG Tampines Rovers	Bishan
	Karthigaya Varmaan 22'; Ifat Sha'aban 84'; Zamani Zamri (yellow card) 53'; Irfan Iskandar (yellow card) 86'; Martyn Mun (yellow card) 90'		Lim Zheng Wu 37'	Stadium: Bishan Stadium; Referee: Faris Abdul Rahman

21 January 2026 13	BG Tampines Rovers (Singapore)	0–3; Awarded (Note: BG Tampines Rovers v Hougang United, originally won 1–0 by Hougang United, was forfeited and awarded 3–0 to BG Tampines by the FAS Disciplinary Committee on 3 Mar 2026, as Hougang United fielded Gloire Amanda, even though he has not completed the required regulatory clearances relating to his work pass status.)	(Singapore) Hougang United	Bishan
	Lim Zheng Wu (yellow card) 88'		Chonlawit Kanuengkid 38'; Kanok Kongsimma (yellow card) 58'; Parinya Nusong (yellow card) 67'	Stadium: Bishan Stadium; Referee: Oswind Suriya

28 April 2026 14 (Rescheduled)	Lion City Sailors (Singapore)	3–2	(Singapore) BG Tampines Rovers	Bishan
	Ahmad Danial 6', 58'; Raiyan Izdihar 42'; Aaryan Fikri (yellow card) 65'; Namsang Rai (yellow card) 75'		Zikos Chua 2'; Talla Ndao 75'; Ong Yu En (yellow card) 48'; Adly Nufail (yellow card) 90+3'	Stadium: Bishan Stadium; Referee: Oswind Suriya

7 May 2026 15 (Rescheduled)	Albirex Niigata (S) (Japan)	1–3	(Singapore) BG Tampines Rovers	Jurong East
	Hilmi Shahrol 74'; Syukri Bashir (yellow card) 32'; Danish Qayyum (yellow card) 43'; Aydin Zufayri (yellow card) 65'		Lim Zheng Wu 9'; Taufik Surpano 42'; Zikos Chua 68'; Iman Hakim (yellow card) 89'	Stadium: Jurong East Stadium; Referee: Hilmi Fuad

24 February 2026 16	Young Lions (Singapore)	1–2	(Singapore) BG Tampines Rovers	Jalan Besar
	Garv Sahoo 65'; Caelan Cheong (yellow card) 48'; Ryan Vishal (yellow card) 58'; Ayden Syaifuallah (yellow card) 90'		Anton Goh 63'; Caden Lim 76'; Shafrel Ariel (yellow card) 26'; Liam Buckley (yellow card) 44'; Ong Yu En (yellow card) 45+2'; Zeeshan Iskandar (yellow card) 88'; Rae Peh (yellow card) 90+3'	Stadium: Jalan Besar Stadium; Referee: Noor Adzdzeeq

17 March 2026 17	BG Tampines Rovers (Singapore)	2–0	(Singapore) Tanjong Pagar United	Tampines
	Zikos Chua 60'; Jasper Chen 85'; Sky Yeo (yellow card) 28'		Anaqi Ismit (yellow card) 72'; Aloysius Pang (yellow card) 78'; Kenji Syed Rusydi (yellow card) 88'	Stadium: Our Tampines Hub; Referee: Hilmi Fuad

31 March 2026 18	Geylang International (Singapore)	0–7	(Singapore) BG Tampines Rovers	Choa Chu Kang
	Ryu Hardy (yellow card) 9'; Irfan Riqifi (yellow card) 83'; Yusri Hanapi (yellow card) 90+3'		Hide Higashikawa 1', 41'; Yuki Kobayashi 39'; Anton Yen Goh 40'; Taufik Suparno 85'; Tallo Ngao 86'; Marc Ryan Tan 90+5'	Stadium: Choa Chu Kang Stadium; Referee: Thawfeek Ahamad

7 April 2026 19	BG Tampines Rovers (Singapore)	5-2	(Singapore) Balestier Khalsa	Tampines
	Ong Yu En 23' (yellow card) 45'; Anton Yen 30'; Zikos Chua 33', 65'; Zeeshan Iskandar 75'; Lim Zheng Wu (yellow card) 35'		Kegan Phang 15' (o.g.); Ilyasin Zayan 41'; Aqil Dany (yellow card) 20'; Syabil Hisham (yellow card) 35'; Irfan Mika'il (yellow card) 43'	Stadium: Our Tampines Hub; Referee: Mazlan Pagira

14 April 2026 20	Hougang United (Singapore)	0–1	(Singapore) BG Tampines Rovers	Tampines
	Khilfi Aniq (yellow card) 27'; Kanok Kongsimma (yellow card) 52' (red card) 77'; Matin Manaf (yellow card) 60'		Tallo Ngao 80' (pen.) (yellow card) 85'; Ong Yu En (yellow card) 65'; Iman Hakim (yellow card) 90+5'	Stadium: Our Tampines Hub; Referee: Faris Abdul Rahman

21 April 2026 21	BG Tampines Rovers (Singapore)	1–2	(Singapore) Lion City Sailors	Tampines
	Tallo Ngao 30' (pen.); Qylfie Ryan (yellow card) 85'		Ahmad Danial 65', 89'	Stadium: Our Tampines Hub; Referee: Aldrick Lee

Pos	Team	Pld	W	D	L	GF	GA	GD	Pts	Qualification or relegation
1	Albirex Niigata (S) II	21	14	1	6	50	23	+27	43	Inaugural Champion
2	Young Lions B	21	13	1	7	52	31	+21	40	
3	BG Tampines Rovers II	21	12	2	7	46	30	+16	38	
4	Geylang International II	21	9	4	8	36	38	−2	31	
5	Tanjong Pagar United II	21	9	3	9	34	43	−9	30	
6	Lion City Sailors II	21	7	2	12	35	41	−6	23	
7	Hougang United II	21	5	4	12	28	43	−15	19	
8	Balestier Khalsa II	21	5	3	13	25	57	−32	18	

First match(es) will be played: 7 May 2026. Source: Singapore Premier League
Rules for classification: 1) points; 2) goal difference; 3) number of goals scored; 4) number of wins

== Competition (Women's Premier League) ==
=== 2025 Women's Premier League ===
Win Draw Loss

2 March 2025 1	Still Aerion Women (Singapore)	2–2	(Singapore) BG Tampines Rovers	Choa Chu Kang
	Nur Iffah 21' (o.g.); Puteri Noralisa 50' (pen.)	Report	Ruby Brooks 55' (pen.), 85' (pen.)	Stadium: Choa Chu Kang Stadium

22 March 2025 2	BG Tampines Rovers (Singapore)	2–3	(Singapore) Hougang United	Choa Chu Kang
	Mio Irisawa 89'; Darvina Halini 90'		Nasriah Ibrahim 2'; Riddle Reneelyn Sison 56'; Sydney Hector 69'	Stadium: Choa Chu Kang Stadium

27 July 2025 3 (Rescheduled)	BG Tampines Rovers (Singapore)	2–0	(Singapore) Tiong Bahru FC	Choa Chu Kang
	Syakirah Jumain; Nur Fitrizah (pen.)			Stadium: Choa Chu Kang Stadium

Match is postponed due to incremental weather

13 August 2025 4 (Rescheduled)	Albirex Niigata (S) (Singapore)	7–0	(Singapore) BG Tampines Rovers	Jalan Besar
	Sitianiwati Rosielin 4'; Manami Fukuzawa 30'; Kana Kitahara 43' 44' 51'; Siti Wan Nabilah 74'; Rosnani Azman 89'			Stadium: Jalan Besar Stadium

Match is postponed due to rescheduled of the SG Cup match which result in the unavailability of the stadium

19 April 2025 5	BG Tampines Rovers (Singapore)	2–9	(Singapore) Lion City Sailors	Choa Chu Kang
	Anna Seng 4'; Ruby Brooks 56'	Report	Putri Alyiah Seow 22', 28', 70', 80'; Sarah Zu’risqha Zul’kepli 43', 45+1', 54'; Raeka Ee Pei Ying 66'; Anaya Sehgal 89'	Stadium: Choa Chu Kang Stadium

6 August 2025 6 (Rescheduled)	Geylang International (Singapore)	3–0	(Singapore) BG Tampines Rovers	Choa Chu Kang
				Stadium: Choa Chu Kang Stadium

Match is postponed due to the unavailability of the stadium as a result of the 2025 General Election

11 May 2025 7	Tanjong Pagar United (Singapore)	0–3	(Singapore) BG Tampines Rovers	Choa Chu Kang
			Anna Seng; Nahwah Aidilreza; Sharifah Amira	Stadium: Choa Chu Kang Stadium

17 May 2025 8	BG Tampines Rovers (Singapore)	1–4	(Singapore) Still Aerion WFC	Choa Chu Kang
	Nahwah Aidilreza			Stadium: Choa Chu Kang Stadium

25 May 2025 9	Hougang United (Singapore)	1–0	(Singapore) BG Tampines Rovers	Choa Chu Kang
				Stadium: Choa Chu Kang Stadium

13 August 2025 10 (Rescheduled)	BG Tampines Rovers (Singapore)	0–7	(Singapore) Albirex Niigata (S)	Choa Chu Kang
				Stadium: Choa Chu Kang Stadium

24 August 2025 11	BG Tampines Rovers (Singapore)	3–1	(Singapore) Balestier Khalsa	Choa Chu Kang
				Stadium: Choa Chu Kang Stadium

31 August 2025 12	Balestier Khalsa (Singapore)	1–1	(Singapore) BG Tampines Rovers	Choa Chu Kang
				Stadium: Choa Chu Kang Stadium

6 September 2025 13	Tiong Bahru FC (Singapore)	1–2	(Singapore) BG Tampines Rovers	Choa Chu Kang
			Mio Irisawa; Nahwah Aidilreza	Stadium: Choa Chu Kang Stadium

13 September 2025 14	Lion City Sailors (Singapore)	0–12	(Singapore) BG Tampines Rovers	Choa Chu Kang
				Stadium: Choa Chu Kang Stadium

20 September 2025 15	BG Tampines Rovers (Singapore)	0–1	(Singapore) Geylang International	Choa Chu Kang
				Stadium: Choa Chu Kang Stadium

4 October 2025 16	BG Tampines Rovers (Singapore)	1–3	(Singapore) Tanjong Pagar United	TBC
	Nuurfathimah			Stadium: TBC

League table

Pos	Team	Pld	W	D	L	GF	GA	GD	Pts	Qualification or relegation
1	Albirex Niigata (S) (C)	16	15	0	1	91	6	+85	45	Qualification for AFC Champions League
2	Still Aerion	16	12	2	2	57	21	+36	38	
3	Lion City Sailors	16	11	3	2	76	10	+66	36	
4	Geylang International	16	9	2	5	40	23	+17	29	
5	Hougang United	16	6	2	8	17	28	−11	20	
6	Tanjong Pagar United	16	4	0	12	11	43	−32	12	
7	Tiong Bahru	16	4	0	12	13	47	−34	12	
8	BG Tampines Rovers	16	3	2	11	17	57	−40	11	
9	Balestier Khalsa	16	2	1	13	11	98	−87	7	

Updated to match(es) played on 12 Oct 2025. Source: Women's Premier League
Rules for classification: 1) points; 2) goal difference; 3) number of goals scored; 4) number of wins
(C) League champions

=== 2026 Women's Premier League ===
Win Draw Loss

24 Jan 2026 1	Tanjong Pagar United (Singapore)	0–2	(Singapore) BG Tampines Rovers	Singapore
		Report	Victoria Hudson 65', 87'	Stadium: Choa Chu Kang Stadium

6 February 2026 2	BG Tampines Rovers (Singapore)	1–4	(Singapore) Geylang International FC	Singapore
				Stadium: Choa Chu Kang Stadium

13 February 2026 3	Lion City Sailors FC (Singapore)	12–0	(Singapore) BG Tampines Rovers FC	Singapore
				Stadium: Yishun Stadium

21 February 2026 4	BG Tampines Rovers FC (Singapore)	0–5	(Singapore) Albirex Jurong FC	Singapore
				Stadium: Choa Chu Kang Stadium

11 March 2026 5	Tiong Bahru WFC (Singapore)	2–3	(Singapore) BG Tampines Rovers FC	Choa Chu Kang
			Nahwah Aidilreza (PEN); Victoria Hudson; Darvina Halini	Stadium: Choa Chu Kang Stadium

14 March 2026 6	BG Tampines Rovers FC (Singapore)	6–0	(Singapore) Hougang United FC	Choa Chu Kang
	Nahwah Aidilreza; Victoria Hudson; Shazana Ashiq; Sharifah Amira; Nursabrina Iskandar			Stadium: Choa Chu Kang Stadium

28 March 2026 7	Balestier Khalsa FC (Singapore)	1-6	(Singapore) BG Tampines Rovers	Singapore
			Victoria Hudson Kinley Melski Mia Thomson	Stadium: Choa Chu Kang Stadium

4 April 2026 8	BG Tampines Rovers (Singapore)	1-6	(Singapore) Still Aerion WFC	Choa Chu Kang
	Nahwah Aidilreza			Stadium: Choa Chu Kang Stadium

11 April 2026 9	BG Tampines Rovers FC (Singapore)	v	(Singapore) Tanjong Pagar United FC	Singapore
				Stadium: TBC

1 May 2026 10	Geylang International FC (Singapore)	v	(Singapore) BG Tampines Rovers FC	Singapore
				Stadium: Choa Chu Kang Stadium

9 May 2026 11	BG Tampines Rovers (Singapore)	v	(Singapore) Lion CIty Sailors FC	Singapore
				Stadium: Choa Chu Kang Stadium

16 May 2026 12	Albirex Jurong FC (Singapore)	v	(Singapore) BG Tampines Rovers FC	Singapore
				Stadium: Choa Chu Kang Stadium

6 September 2025 13	BG Tampines Rovers FC (Singapore)	v	(Singapore) Tiong Bahru FC	Singapore
				Stadium: Bukit Gombak Stadium

13 June 2026 14	Hougang United FC (Singapore)	v	(Singapore) BG Tampines Rovers	Singapore
				Stadium: Bukit Gombak Stadium

19 June 2026 15	BG Tampines Rovers (Singapore)	v	(Singapore) Balestier Khalsa FC	Singapore
				Stadium: Choa Chu Kang Stadium

TBC 16	Still Aerion WFC (Singapore)	v	(Singapore) BG Tampines Rovers FC	TBC
				Stadium: TBC

League table

Pos	Team	Pld	W	D	L	GF	GA	GD	Pts	Qualification or relegation
1	Lion City Sailors (C)	16	15	0	1	166	4	+162	45	Qualification for AFC Champions League
2	Albirex Jurong	16	15	0	1	140	6	+134	45	
3	Still Aerion	16	11	1	4	52	27	+25	34	
4	Geylang International	16	10	1	5	44	28	+16	31	
5	BG Tampines Rovers	16	7	1	8	30	58	−28	22	
6	Tanjong Pagar United	16	3	3	10	8	75	−67	12	
7	Balestier Khalsa	16	4	0	12	19	107	−88	12	
8	Tiong Bahru (R)	16	1	2	13	16	64	−48	5	Play-off with WNL runners-up
9	Hougang United (R)	16	1	2	13	9	115	−106	5	Relegation to National League

Source: Women's Premier League
Rules for classification: 1) points; 2) goal difference; 3) number of goals scored; 4) number of wins
(C) League champions; (R) Relegated
