= 2025–26 Singapore Cup =

2025–2026 Singapore Cup
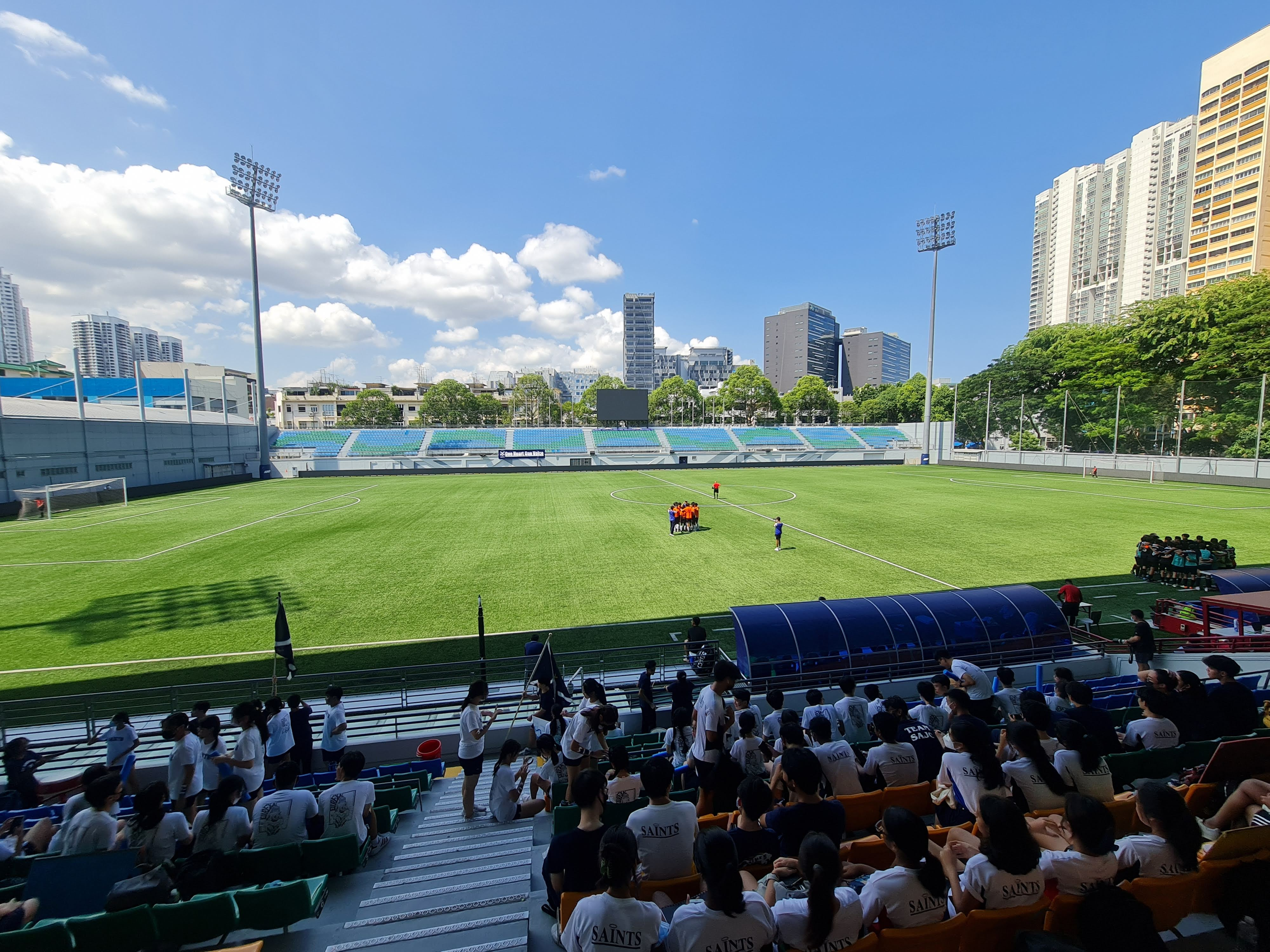
- Jalan Besar Stadium hosted the final on 10 January 2026

Tournament details
- Country: Singapore
- Dates: 1 November 2025 – 10 January 2026
- Teams: 7

The 2025–26 Singapore Cup was the 26th edition of the Singapore Cup, Singapore's annual premier club football knock-out tournament organised by the Football Association of Singapore (FAS).

The winner qualified to the group stage of the 2026–27 AFC Champions League Two. Lion City Sailors are the defending champions, having won the tournament in the previous season. Sailors won the final 2–0 after extra time to retain the trophy. However, the FAS awarded them a 3–0 win by forfeit as Tampines Rovers FC did not play with at least four Singaporean players on the pitch at all times during the match.

== Format ==
Seven teams competed in this season's competition. The Young Lions participated in this edition of the Singapore Cup as they prepared for the 2025 SEA Games, which was held in Thailand from 3 to 18 December.

All teams had to maintain a minimum of four Singaporean players on the pitch for the whole match, unless a Singaporean player had been sent off by the referee.

The two top teams in the previous season, Lion City Sailors and BG Tampines Rovers (who were last season's finalists), automatically advanced to the semi-finals based on their sporting performance. The other five teams will compete in a single round-robin group stage, with each club playing four matches. The top two teams from this group will then progress to the two-legged semi-finals.

== Group stage ==
| 1 November 2025 1 | Geylang International (Singapore) | 0–3 | (Japan) Albirex Niigata (S) | Tampines |
| | Nikola Ignjatovic (yellow card) 20'; Shakir Hamzah (red card) 23' | Report | Shingo Nakano 26' (pen.), 83', 90+9' (yellow card) 89'; Sim Jun Yen (yellow card) 17' | Stadium: Our Tampines Hub; Referee: Jansen Foo; Man of the Match: (Japan) Shingo Nakano |

| 2 November 2025 2 | Balestier Khalsa (Singapore) | 3–0 | (Singapore) Tanjong Pagar United | Bishan |
| | Tin Matić 37'; Jakov Katuša 77'; Daniel Goh 82'; Madhu Mohana (yellow card) 42'; Harith Kanadi (red card) 45+4'; Darren Teh (yellow card) 89' | Report | Sahil Suhaimi (yellow card) 60' (yellow-red card) 62'; Bruno Dybal (yellow card) 89' | Stadium: Bishan Stadium; Referee: Andrea Verolino; Man of the Match: (Croatia) Jakov Katuša |

| 6 November 2025 3 | Albirex Niigata (S) (Japan) | 3–2 | (Singapore) Balestier Khalsa | Jurong East |
| | Takumi Yokohata 22'; Kim Tae-uk 90+4'; Nicky Melvin Singh 90+8' | Report | Tin Matić 59' (pen.); Jakov Katuša 74'; Fudhil I’yadh (yellow card) 40'; Masahiro Sugita (yellow card) 68' | Stadium: Jurong East Stadium; Referee: Syarqawi Buhari; Man of the Match: (Singapore) (Philippines) Nicky Melvin Singh |

| 7 November 2025 4 | Tanjong Pagar United (Singapore) | 2–3 | (Singapore) Hougang United | Jurong East |
| | Youssef Ezzejjari 83' (pen.); Bruno Dybal 89' (yellow card) 45+1'; Raihan Rahman (yellow card) 53'; Lim Hyun-Sub (yellow card) 90+7' | Report | Farhan Zulkifli 10'; Settawut Wongsai 19', 64'; Yuma Suwa (red card) 51'; Víctor Blasco (yellow card) 84'; Parinya Nusong (yellow card) 87' | Stadium: Jurong East Stadium; Referee: Mazlan Pagira; Man of the Match: (Singapore) Farhan Zulkifli |

| 22 November 2025 5 | Hougang United (Singapore) | 3–0 | (Singapore) Geylang International | Tampines |
| | Nabilai Kibunguchy 69' (yellow card) 90+8'; Farhan Zulkifli 73'; Chonlawit Kanuengkid 77'; Víctor Blasco (yellow card) 17'; Huzaifah Aziz (yellow card) 88' | | Gareth Low (yellow card) 85' | Stadium: Our Tampines Hub; Referee: Taufik Thana; Man of the Match: (Singapore) Farhan Zulkifli |

| 23 November 2025 6 | Albirex Niigata (S) (Japan) | 1–0 | (Singapore) Tanjong Pagar United | Jurong East |
| | Katsuyuki Ishibashi 55' | Report | Youssef Ezzejjari (yellow card) 61' | Stadium: Jurong East Stadium; Referee: Zulfiqar Mustaffa; Man of the Match: (Japan) Katsuyuki Ishibashi |

| 29 November 2025 7 | Hougang United (Singapore) | 1–1 | (Japan) Albirex Niigata (S) | Tampines |
| | Parinya Nusong 20'; Jordan Vestering (yellow card) 37' | Report | Shingo Nakano 64'; Takumi Yokohata (yellow card) 5' | Stadium: Our Tampines Hub; Referee: Farhan Mohd |

| 30 November 2025 8 | Geylang International (Singapore) | 3–3 | (Singapore) Balestier Khalsa | Tampines |
| | Riku Fukashiro 83' (yellow card) 64'; Vincent Bezecourt 88' (penalty missed) 68; Ryoya Taniguchi 90+5'; Nizwan Izzairie (yellow card) 1' (yellow-red card) 20'; Nazrul Nazari (yellow card) 43' | Report | Tin Matić 14', 22' (yellow card) 34'; Lazar Vujanic 90+2' (yellow card) 56'; Mario Šubarić (yellow card) 63'; Harith Kanadi (yellow card) 66' | Stadium: Our Tampines Hub; Referee: Ahmad A'Qashah |

| 6 December 2025 9 | Tanjong Pagar United (Singapore) | 1–4 | (Singapore) Geylang International | Jurong East |
| | Faizal Roslan (red card) 26'; Raihan Rahman (yellow card) 29'; Aaron Evans (yellow card) 75'; Youssef Ezzejjari 70' (pen.) (yellow card) 90+1' | | Shuhei Hoshino 5', 58'; Riku Fukashiro 15'; Vincent Bezecourt 38'; Shahdan Sulaiman (miss p)28; Ryoya Taniguchi (yellow card) 90+2' | Stadium: Jurong East Stadium; Referee: Clarence Leow |

| 7 December 2025 10 | Balestier Khalsa (Singapore) | 2–1 | (Singapore) Hougang United | Bishan |
| | Tin Matić 45+1'; Ignatius Ang 54'; Lazar Vujanic (yellow card) 33'; Daniel Goh (yellow card) 78' | Report | Farhan Zulkifli 62' (red card) 90+9'; Settawut Wongsai (yellow card) 36'; Huzaifah Aziz (yellow card) 90+11' | Stadium: Bishan Stadium; Referee: Thaufeek Ahmad |

=== League table ===
| Pos | Team | Pld | W | D | L | GF | GA | GD | Pts | Qualification |
|---|---|---|---|---|---|---|---|---|---|---|
| 1 | Albirex Niigata (S) (Q) | 4 | 3 | 1 | 0 | 8 | 3 | +5 | 10 | Semi-finals |
| 2 | Balestier Khalsa (Q) | 4 | 2 | 1 | 1 | 10 | 7 | +3 | 7 | Semi-finals |
| 3 | Hougang United | 4 | 2 | 1 | 1 | 8 | 5 | +3 | 7 | |
| 4 | Geylang International | 4 | 1 | 1 | 2 | 7 | 10 | −3 | 4 | |
| 5 | Tanjong Pagar United | 4 | 0 | 0 | 4 | 3 | 11 | −8 | 0 | |

Source: FAS
(Q) Qualified for the phase indicated

== Semi-finals ==
The Singapore Cup semi-final first and second legs will be held on 14 and 20 December 2025

| Team 1 | Agg. | Team 2 | 1st leg | 2nd leg |
|---|---|---|---|---|
| Balestier Khalsa | 1–5 | Lion City Sailors | 1–4 | 0–1 |
| Albirex Niigata (S) | 3–5 | BG Tampines Rovers | 0–4 | 3–1 |

=== Matches ===
First leg

14 December 2025
Semi Final A Leg 1

| Balestier Khalsa (Singapore) | 1–4 | (Singapore) Lion City Sailors |
|---|---|---|
| Bogdan Mandić 12' | | Bailey Wright 26'; Lennart Thy 34'; Shawal Anuar 47'; Anderson Lopes 58' |

Bishan Stadium, Bishan
Referee: Andrea Verolino

Second leg

20 December 2025
Semi Final A Leg 2

| Lion City Sailors (Singapore) | 1–0 | (Singapore) Balestier Khalsa |
|---|---|---|
| Shawal Anuar 8'; Maxime Lestienne (penalty missed) 72 |

Jalan Besar Stadium, Jalan Besar
Referee: Muhammad Taqi

Lion City Sailors won 5–1 on aggregate.

First leg

14 December 2025
Semi Final B Leg 1

| Albirex Niigata (S) (Japan) | 0–4 | (Singapore) BG Tampines Rovers |
|---|---|---|
| Haziq Kamarudin (yellow card) 60'; Takumi Yokohata (yellow card) 71' | | Hide Higashikawa 56'; Joel Chew 76'; Trent Buhagiar 85'; Tallo Ngao 90+3'; Amirul Adli (yellow card) 45+3' |

Jurong East Stadium, Jurong East
Referee: Farhan Mohd

Second leg

20 December 2025
Semi Final B Leg 2

| BG Tampines Rovers (Singapore) | 1–3 | (Japan) Albirex Niigata (S) |
|---|---|---|
| Seiga Sumi 55'; Amirul Adli (yellow card) 71' | | Nozomi Ozawa 18'; Shingo Nakano 43' (yellow card) 78'; Katsuyuki Ishibashi 72'; Kim Tae-uk (yellow card) 27' |

Our Tampines Hub, Tampines
Referee: Clarence Leow

Tampines Rovers won 5–3 on aggregate.

== Final ==
The Singapore Cup final was held at the Jalan Besar Stadium on 10 January 2026.

10 January 2026
Final

| Lion City Sailors (Singapore) | 2–0 (a.e.t.) | (Singapore) BG Tampines Rovers |
|---|---|---|
| Syahin 115'; Lopes 120+2' |

Jalan Besar Stadium, Kallang
Attendance: 3,767
Referee: Adam Kersey (Australia)
Man of the Match: Bailey Wright

Lion City Sailors won 3–0 by forfeit as Tampines Rovers breached the competition rules by having less than the minimum number of Singaporean players on the pitch.

== Statistics ==
=== Top scorer ===
As of 10 Jun 26

| Rank | Player | Team | Goals |
|---|---|---|---|
| 1 | (Croatia) Tin Matić | (Singapore) Balestier Khalsa | 5 |
| 1 | (Japan) Shingo Nakano | (Japan) Albirex Niigata (S) | 5 |
| 2 | (Singapore) Farhan Zulkifli | (Singapore) Hougang United | 3 |
| 3 | (Croatia) Jakov Katuša | (Singapore) Balestier Khalsa | 2 |
| 3 | (Serbia) Lazar Vujanic | (Singapore) Balestier Khalsa | 2 |
| 3 | (Japan) Riku Fukashiro | (Singapore) Geylang International | 2 |
| 3 | (Japan) Shuhei Hoshino | (Singapore) Geylang International | 2 |
| 3 | (France) Vincent Bezecourt | (Singapore) Geylang International | 2 |
| 3 | (Thailand) Settawut Wongsai | (Singapore) Hougang United | 2 |
| 3 | (Brazil) Anderson Lopes | (Singapore) Lion City Sailors | 2 |
| 3 | (Singapore) Shawal Anuar | (Singapore) Lion City Sailors | 2 |
| 3 | (Spain) (Morocco) Youssef Ezzejjari | (Singapore) Tanjong Pagar United | 2 |
| 4 | (South Korea) Kim Tae-uk | (Japan) Albirex Niigata (S) | 1 |
| 4 | (Japan) Katsuyuki Ishibashi | (Japan) Albirex Niigata (S) | 1 |
| 4 | (Japan) Nozomi Ozawa | (Japan) Albirex Niigata (S) | 1 |
| 4 | (Japan) Takumi Yokohata | (Japan) Albirex Niigata (S) | 1 |
| 4 | (Singapore) (Philippines) Nicky Melvin Singh | (Japan) Albirex Niigata (S) | 1 |
| 4 | (Serbia) Bogdan Mandić | (Singapore) Balestier Khalsa | 1 |
| 4 | (Singapore) Daniel Goh | (Singapore) Balestier Khalsa | 1 |
| 4 | (Singapore) Ignatius Ang | (Singapore) Balestier Khalsa | 1 |
| 4 | (Malta) (Australia) Trent Buhagiar | (Singapore) BG Tampines Rovers | 1 |
| 4 | (Japan) Hide Higashikawa | (Singapore) BG Tampines Rovers | 1 |
| 4 | (Japan) Seiga Sumi | (Singapore) BG Tampines Rovers | 1 |
| 4 | (Japan) (Ghana) Tallo Ngao | (Singapore) BG Tampines Rovers | 1 |
| 4 | (Singapore) Joel Chew | (Singapore) BG Tampines Rovers | 1 |
| 4 | (Japan) Ryoya Taniguchi | (Singapore) Geylang International | 1 |
| 4 | (Thailand) Chonlawit Kanuengkid | (Singapore) Hougang United | 1 |
| 4 | (Thailand) Parinya Nusong | (Singapore) Hougang United | 1 |
| 4 | (Kenya) (United States) Nabilai Kibunguchy | (Singapore) Hougang United | 1 |
| 4 | (Australia) Bailey Wright | (Singapore) Lion City Sailors | 1 |
| 4 | (Germany) Lennart Thy | (Singapore) Lion City Sailors | 1 |
| 4 | (Singapore) Hami Syahin | (Singapore) Lion City Sailors | 1 |
| 4 | (Brazil) Bruno Dybal | (Singapore) Tanjong Pagar United | 1 |

=== Top assists ===
As of 10 January 2026

| Rank | Player | Team | Assists |
|---|---|---|---|
| 1 | (Belgium) Maxime Lestienne | (Singapore) Lion City Sailors | 4 |
| 2 | (Japan) Masahiro Sugita | (Singapore) Balestier Khalsa | 3 |
| 2 | (Croatia) Tin Matić | (Singapore) Balestier Khalsa | 3 |
| 3 | (Croatia) Jakov Katuša | (Singapore) Balestier Khalsa | 2 |
| 3 | (France) Vincent Bezecourt | (Singapore) Geylang International | 2 |
| 3 | (Japan) Shuhei Hoshino | (Singapore) Geylang International | 2 |
| 3 | (Singapore) Farhan Zulkifli | (Singapore) Hougang United | 2 |
| 2 | (Singapore) Danish Qayyum | (Japan) Albirex Niigata (S) | 1 |
| 2 | (Japan) Katsuyuki Ishibashi | (Japan) Albirex Niigata (S) | 1 |
| 2 | (Japan) Naoki Yoshioka | (Japan) Albirex Niigata (S) | 1 |
| 2 | (Japan) Ren Nishimura | (Japan) Albirex Niigata (S) | 1 |
| 2 | (Japan) Takumi Yokohata | (Japan) Albirex Niigata (S) | 1 |
| 2 | (Singapore) Ignatius Ang | (Singapore) Balestier Khalsa | 1 |
| 2 | (Serbia) Bogdan Mandić | (Singapore) Balestier Khalsa | 1 |
| 2 | (Serbia) Lazar Vujanic | (Singapore) Balestier Khalsa | 1 |
| 2 | (Japan) Hide Higashikawa | (Singapore) BG Tampines Rovers | 1 |
| 2 | (Japan) Koya Kazama | (Singapore) BG Tampines Rovers | 1 |
| 2 | (Japan) Takeshi Yoshimoto | (Singapore) BG Tampines Rovers | 1 |
| 2 | (Japan) Ryoya Taniguchi | (Singapore) Geylang International | 1 |
| 2 | (Japan) Shodai Yokoyama | (Singapore) Geylang International | 1 |
| 2 | (Singapore) Shahdan Sulaiman | (Singapore) Geylang International | 1 |
| 2 | (Spain) Víctor Blasco | (Singapore) Hougang United | 1 |
| 2 | (Thailand) Yotsakorn Burapha | (Singapore) Hougang United | 1 |
| 2 | (Japan) Yuma Suwa | (Singapore) Hougang United | 1 |
| 2 | (Portugal) Diogo Costa | (Singapore) Lion City Sailors | 1 |
| 2 | (Croatia) Ivan Sušak | (Singapore) Lion City Sailors | 1 |
| 2 | (Singapore) Faizal Roslan | (Singapore) Tanjong Pagar United | 1 |

=== Clean sheets ===
As of 10 January 2026

| Rank | Player | Team | Clean sheets |
|---|---|---|---|
| 1 | (Singapore) Hassan Sunny | (Japan) Albirex Niigata (S) | 2 |
| 2 | (Croatia) Mario Mustapić | (Singapore) Balestier Khalsa | 1 |
| 2 | (Singapore) Syazwan Buhari | (Singapore) BG Tampines Rovers | 1 |
| 2 | (Singapore) Zharfan Rohaizad | (Singapore) Hougang United | 1 |
| 2 | (Croatia) Ivan Sušak | (Singapore) Lion City Sailors | 1 |

=== Own goal ===
As of 27 May 2025

| Player | For | Against | Date |

=== Hat-tricks ===
As of 1 November 2025

| Player | For | Against | Date |
|---|---|---|---|
| (Japan) Shingo Nakano | (Japan) Albirex Niigata (S) | Geylang International | 3–0 (1 Nov 2025) |

Note ^{4} Player scored 4 goals

=== Penalty missed ===
As at 6 December 2025

| Player | For | Against | Date |
|---|---|---|---|
| (Singapore) Shahdan Sulaiman | Geylang International | Tanjong Pagar United | 6 December 2025 |
