= Luka Adžić =

Serbian footballer

Personal information
- Full name: Luka Adžić
- Date of birth: 17 September 1998 (age 28)
- Place of birth: Belgrade, FR Yugoslavia
- Height: 1.84 m (6 ft 0 in)
- Position: Left winger

Team information
- Current team: Železničar Pančevo
- Number: 9

Youth career
- 2004–2017: Red Star Belgrade

Senior career*
Years	Team	Apps	(Gls)
2016–2018	Red Star Belgrade	33	(6)
2018–2021	Anderlecht	5	(0)
2020	→ Emmen (loan)	3	(1)
2020–2021	→ Ankaragücü (loan)	11	(0)
2021	→ Emmen (loan)	12	(3)
2021–2022	PEC Zwolle	16	(0)
2022–2024	Čukarički	50	(8)
2024–2026	Bangkok United	26	(4)
2026	Lion City Sailors	4	(0)
2026–	Železničar Pančevo	0	(0)

International career
2015	Serbia U18	4	(0)
2016−2017	Serbia U19	9	(1)
2017−2020	Serbia U21	19	(2)
- * Club domestic league appearances and goals as of 20 August 2026

Luka Adžić (Serbian Cyrillic: Лука Аџић; born 17 September 1998) is a Serbian professional footballer who plays as a left winger for Serbian Superliga club Železničar Pančevo.

== Club career ==
=== Red Star Belgrade ===
Born in Belgrade, Adžić joined Red Star Belgrade at the age of 6. He joined the first team of Red Star Belgrade for the 2015–16 season, after he passed all youth categories of the same club. At the beginning of 2016, during the winter break off-season, he suffered an anterior cruciate ligament injury, and later he was out of the field until May same year. He signed his first three-year professional contract with club on 3 March 2016.

Adžić returned the next season, but stayed with youth team until the end of first half-season in youth league, after which he rejoined the first team. In the meantime, he made his official debut for Red Star Belgrade in a cup match against BSK Borča, played on 26 October 2016 at the Rajko Mitić Stadium. Adžić made his Serbian SuperLiga debut in away match against Metalac Gornji Milanovac replacing Srđan Plavšić in 83 minute, and he also scored his first senior goal for 2–1 victory in last minutes of the game. Adžić scored his second goal for the team in 23rd fixture match of the 2016–17 Serbian SuperLiga season, against OFK Bačka, when he also joined the game as a substitution. Adžić started his first senior match on the field in last fixture match of the season, against Radnički Niš.

During the summer 2017 pre-season, Adžić presented as one of the club's top 10 youth prospects. He converted his squad number before the 2017–18 UEFA Europa League qualifications, taking jersey 11. On 29 June 2017, Adžić made his first continental appearance, replacing Ricardo Cavalcante Mendes during the match against Floriana. Adžić joined his first eternal derby, replacing Slavoljub Srnić in 90 minute of a match played on 27 August 2017. Adžić scored his first season realising direct free kick goal in the Serbian Cup match against Dinamo Vranje 11 October 2017. Later, during the same match, he completed his first hat-trick in professional career, by two Aleksandar Pešić's assists. In opening match of the second half- season of the 2017–18 Serbian SuperLiga campaign, played on 17 February 2018, Adžić scored his second league goal, against Javor Ivanjica. Several days later, on 21 February, Adžić also joined in the second leg against CSKA Moscow in Round of 32 match of the UEFA Europa League. On 18 March 2018, Adžić realised a direct free kick in 28 SuperLiga fixture against Mačva Šabac. Replacing Slavoljub Srnić in second half of the match against Čukarički, played on 25 April 2018, Adžić scored and made an assist to El Fardou Ben Nabouhane in 3–0 victory. In May 2018, he suffered a toe injury and missed the rest of season.

=== Anderlecht ===
In May 2018, reports of interest from Anderlecht surfaced, after which Adžić refused to sign a new contract with Red Star. On 23 May 2018, he signed a four-year contract with Anderlecht and the transfer fee was reported to be €800,000.

=== Emmen (loan) ===
Adžić scored on his debut for Emmen on 21 February 2020 while playing against Willem II.

=== PEC Zwolle ===
On 31 August 2021, Adžić joined Dutch club PEC Zwolle as a free agent, for the term of one year with an option for another. He made his debut on 2 October in a 1–0 home loss to SC Heerenveen, coming on as a substitute in the 76th minute for Gervane Kastaneer. His first goal for the club came on 14 December in a 4–0 win in the KNVB Cup over MVV.

=== Čukarički ===
In July 2022, Adžić returned home to signed with Čukarički. On 30 November 2023, he scored a goal in the UEFA Europa Conference League group stage match against Ferencváros in a 2–1 lost.

=== Bangkok United ===
On 8 July 2024, Adžić signed for Thai League 1 club Bangkok United.

=== Lion City Sailors ===
Luka signed for Singapore Premier League club Lion City Sailors on 6 January 2026 for the remainder of the 2025–26 season. He make his debut in the 2025–26 Singapore Cup final against Tampines Rovers on 10 January 2026 where Adžić went on to lift the trophy after a 2–0 win for Lion City Sailors.

== International career ==
Adžić was called into the Serbia national under-18 football team and played several matches in 2015 under coach Ivan Tomić. He was also a member of the Serbia U19 squad between 2016 and 2017. He scored his first goal for the team in a friendly match against Bulgaria, played on 21 February 2017. Adžić got his first call in Serbian under-21 team by coach Goran Đorović in August 2017. Adžić made his debut for the team replacing Aleksandar Mesarović in 80 minute of the match against Gibraltar on 1 September 2017.

== Career statistics ==
=== Club ===
As of match played 12 August 2025

Appearances and goals by club, season and competition
Club	Season	League			Cup		League Cup		Continental		Other		Total	
Club	Season	Division	Apps	Goals	Apps	Goals	Apps	Goals	Apps	Goals	Apps	Goals	Apps	Goals
Red Star Belgrade	2015–16	Serbian SuperLiga	0	0	0	0	—		—		—		0	0
Red Star Belgrade	2016–17	Serbian SuperLiga	7	2	3	0	—		0	0	—		10	2
Red Star Belgrade	2017–18	Serbian SuperLiga	26	4	1	3	—		2	0	—		29	7
Red Star Belgrade	Total		33	6	4	3	—		2	0	—		39	9
Anderlecht	2019–20	Belgian First Division A	5	0	1	0	—		—		—		6	0
Emmen (loan)	2019–20	Eredivisie	3	1	—		—		—		—		3	1
Ankaragücü (loan)	2020–21	Süper Lig	11	0	1	0	—		—		—		12	0
Emmen (loan)	2020–21	Eredivisie	12	3	—		—		—		1	0	13	3
PEC Zwolle	2021–22	Eredivisie	16	0	3	1	—		—		—		19	1
Čukarički	2022–23	Serbian SuperLiga	22	2	4	2	—		2	1	—		28	5
Čukarički	2023–24	Serbian SuperLiga	31	6	2	0	—		4	1	—		37	7
Čukarički	Total		53	8	6	2	—		6	2	—		65	12
Bangkok United	2024–25	Thai League 1	16	4	2	0	3	0	4	1	—		25	5
Bangkok United	2025–26	Thai League 1	9	0	0	0	0	0	8 (Note: 1 appearance in ACL Elite, 5 in ACL 2, 2 in Shopee Cup)	1 (Note: 1 goal in Shopee Cup)	—		17	1
Bangkok United	Total		25	4	2	0	3	0	12	2	—		42	6
Career total			158	22	17	6	3	0	20	4	1	0	199	32

== Honours ==
=== Club ===
==== Red Star Belgrade ====
- Serbian SuperLiga: 2017–18

==== Lion City Sailors ====
- Singapore Cup: 2025–26

=== Individual ===
- Serbian SuperLiga Player of the Week: 2023–24 (Round 25)

== Personal life ==
Luka is a son of former footballer Ivan Adžić, and grandson of a Serbian folk singer Šaban Šaulić.

Prior to the 2023 Serbian parliamentary election Adžić, along with his father, pledged support to Aleksandar Vucic and his campaign.
