= 2025–26 Singapore Premier League =

Singapore Premier League
- Season: 2025–26
- Dates: 23 August 2025 – 18 May 2026
- Champions: Lion City Saillors
- Champions League Two: Lion City Saillors; BG Tampines Rovers
- Matches: 51
- Goals: 192 (3.76 per match)
- Top goalscorer: Shingo Nakano (20 goals)
- Biggest home win: Lion City Sailors 7–0 Tanjong Pagar United (16 January 2026)
- Biggest away win: Tanjong Pagar United 0–7 Lion City Sailors (15 February 2025)
- Highest scoring: BG Tampines Rovers 7–1 Young Lions (16 January 2026)
- Longest winning run: 10 matches Lion City Sailors
- Longest unbeaten run: 13 matches Lion City Saillors
- Longest winless run: 10 matches Young Lions
- Longest losing run: 6 matches Young Lions

The 2025–26 Singapore Premier League (also known as the AIA Singapore Premier League due to sponsorship reasons) was the 8th season of the Singapore Premier League, the top-flight Singaporean professional league for football clubs, since its rebranding in 2018.

Lion City Sailors are the defending champions after winning the previous season.

== Format ==
The following key changes were made to the rules from the 2025–26 season onwards.

1. Teams must register a combined squad for both the SPL and reserve league (SPL2), with a minimum of 36 and a maximum of 50 players. At least 25 local players are to be registered.
2. Each team will play other 3 times in a season.
3. SPL will be scheduled from Friday to Monday and SPL 2 from Monday to Wednesday. All matches to kick off at 7.30pm.
4. Teams must field a minimum of four local players & maximum of seven foreigners in the SPL matches.
5. SPL2 will serve as a “developmental league" to replace U21 league. Clubs must field a minimum of six local players (including 4 U23) on the field at all times.
6. Prize increased to $600k and will be shared by the top 6 teams.

The transfer window was as follows.

1. 1st transfer window: 9 June 2025 to 31 August 2025
2. 2nd transfer window: 1 January 2026 to 31 January 2026

== Changes ==
1. On 26 March 2025, DPMM announced their intention to return to Malaysian Football after 17 years of absence. On 22 May 2025, FAS confirmed that the team will not participate in the Singapore Premier League (SPL) after the 2024–25 season.

=== Stadiums and locations ===
Locations of the 2025–26 Singapore Premier League teams from Singapore

Image	Team	Stadium	Capacity
	Albirex Niigata (S); Tanjong Pagar United; Geylang International (MD2); Hougang United (MD4)	Jurong East Stadium	2,700
	Lion City Sailors (until 30-Nov-25); Balestier Khalsa; Hougang United (MD8, MD16, and from 10-Dec-25)	Bishan Stadium	10,000
	Young Lions; Hougang United (Until 30-Nov-25); Lion City Sailors (from 10-Dec-25)	Jalan Besar Stadium	6,000
	BG Tampines Rovers; Geylang International; Balestier Khalsa (MD1); Hougang United (MD3, MD5); Lion City Sailors (MD1); Young Lions (MD2, MD3, MD5)	Our Tampines Hub	5,100

== Personnel, kit and sponsoring ==
Note: Flags indicate national team as has been defined under FIFA eligibility rules. Players may hold more than one non-FIFA nationality.

Team	Head coach	Captain	Kit manufacturer	Main shirt sponsor	Other sponsors
Albirex Niigata (S)	(Japan) Keiji Shigetomi	(South Korea) Kim Tae-uk (Japan) Shingo Nakano	(Spain) Kelme	(Japan) Godzilla	{{smalldiv|: Apparel & Footwear & Training Wear Dpro Logistics Namics Skechers Singapore Alpha Equips Luluto Meiji Yasuda; Front: Reeracoen Black Clover SingaLife g.spa Kubota; Back: Warrantee; Sleeve: EnglishCentral Kirin Takasago Singapore; Shorts: Gain City Miura; Partners Daiho Group JTB NSG Sanpoutei Ramen SMBC ACCEA Singapore PR Times Prestige Property ANA EAA Direct IGPI Group Ma Masion Dr. Stretch JPlus+ Salonpas Soken Medical OneTap Sports Crown Line Tomi Sushi Sankyu One Asia Lawyers SD Aircon SETA Technologies Hiroyuki AO Service Pro Itadakimasu Pocari Sweat KoachHub Fuji Electric Asia Pacific Sugoyose Any1 Choco Cotovia Clinic Star Soccer Network
Balestier Khalsa	(Croatia) Marko Kraljević	(Singapore) Madhu Mohana (Singapore) Darren Teh	(Germany) Adidas	(Singapore) Komoco	{{smalldiv|: Front: Dr. Stretch; Back: Casuarina Curry; Shorts: Partners:
BG Tampines Rovers	(Nigeria) Robert Eziakor (interim)	(Singapore) Syazwan Buhari	(Thailand) Warrix	(Thailand) BG	{{smalldiv|: Sleeve: Construction Investment Managers; Partners: StarBalm Therabody My Protein Singapore No Last Game JSSL FC Dr. Stretch No Last Game REstee Hotel Planner
Geylang International	(Singapore) Mohd Noor Ali	(Singapore) Joshua Pereira	(Thailand) FBT	(Singapore) Emerald Eagles	{{smalldiv|: Sleeve: Rigel ProRehab; Back: Partners: City Football Club Dr. Stretch Koach Hub TRUE Fitness Pillai Sports Rigel Technology KoachHub Think Batik Koshin Kogyo Westpoint
Hougang United	(Thailand) Pannarai Pansiri (interim)	(Singapore) Anders Aplin	(Thailand) Volt	(Japan) Supercharge Daikin	{{smalldiv|: Partners: Koach Hub; Front: AP21 StarBalm Acro Meta (CF); Back: Anytime Fitness; Sleeve: Sports Frontier 365
Lion City Sailors	(Spain) Jesús Casas	(Singapore) Hariss Harun	(Germany) Adidas	(Singapore) SEA (Singapore) Shopee (Continental)	{{smalldiv|: Front: AMP Lab (WPL only) Bone Setting (WPL only) Activ.co (WPL only); Sleeve: Garena Shopee (SPL & WPL); Partners: Applied Nutrition Mari Bank StarBalm Griddy Grid #WLJK
Tanjong Pagar United	(Singapore) Noh Alam Shah	(Australia) Aaron Evans	(Denmark) Hummel	(Singapore) Adactive Asia	{{smalldiv|: Partners: Carats & Co iTapes EnakEnak Srfutbol Westpoint Koach Hub
Young Lions	(Singapore) Firdaus Kassim	(Singapore) Amir Syafiz	(Denmark) Select	(China) Dongfeng	{{smalldiv|: Front: Catapult; Sleeve: Ryudben Sports

=== Coaching changes ===
Team	Outgoing head coach	Manner of departure	Date of vacancy	Position in table	Incoming head coach	Date of appointment
Tanjong Pagar United	(Singapore) Noh Alam Shah (interim)	Appointed to permanent role				1 July 2025
Hougang United	(Nigeria) Robert Eziakor (interim)	Appointed to permanent role				1 July 2025
Balestier Khalsa	(Netherlands) Peter de Roo	End of contract	31 May 2025	Pre-season	(Croatia) Marko Kraljević	30 June 2025
BG Tampines Rovers	(Singapore) Gavin Lee	Mutual agreement	17 June 2025	Pre-season	(Singapore) Akbar Nawas	20 June 2025
Young Lions	(Singapore) Fadzuhasny Juraimi	End of interim period	25 June 2025	Pre-season	(Singapore) Firdaus Kassim	25 June 2025
BG Tampines Rovers	(Singapore) Akbar Nawas (Note: Akbar was subsequently announced as the TD of Hougang United on 22 Sept.)	Mutual agreement	11 September 2025	4th	(Singapore) Noh Rahman (interim)	11 September 2025
Hougang United	(Nigeria) Robert Eziakor (interim)	Mutual agreement	27 October 2025	6th	(Thailand) Pannarai Pansiri (interim)	27 October 2025
Lion City Sailors	(Serbia) Aleksandar Ranković	Mutual agreement	6 February 2026	1st	(Spain) Varo Moreno (interim)	6 February 2026
BG Tampines Rovers	(Singapore) Noh Rahman (interim)	Mutual agreement	14 February 2026	2nd	(Nigeria) Robert Eziakor (interim)	14 February 2026
Lion City Sailors	(Spain) Varo Moreno (interim)	End of interim period	22 February 2026	1st	(Spain) Jesús Casas	22 February 2026
BG Tampines Rovers	(Nigeria) Robert Eziakor (interim)	End of interim period	3 April 2026	2nd	(Japan) Katsuhito Kinoshi	3 April 2026
Hougang United	(Thailand) Pannarai Pansiri (interim)	Redesignated as Asst.Coach	12 April 2026	6th	(Singapore) Akbar Nawas	12 April 2026
BG Tampines Rovers	(Japan) Katsuhito Kinoshi	Stepped down	15 April 2026	2nd	(Singapore) William Phang (interim)	15 April 2026

== Foreign players ==
Clubs is to register a combined squad for both the Singapore Premier League (SPL) and the reserve league. The squad must comprise a minimum of 36 players to a maximum of 50 players, with at least 25 players being Singaporean. While there is no minimum number of foreign players a club must register, depending on the squad size, theoretically, a club can have 25 Singaporeans and 25 foreigners in their 50-player squad.

- Players name in **bold** indicates the players were registered during the mid-season transfer window.
- Players name in italics indicates the player were out of squad or left their respective clubs during the mid-season transfer window / before season end.
- Players with SPL2 are registered mainly for SPL2 competition.

Team	Players								
Albirex Niigata (S)	Player 1	Player 2	Player 3	Player 4	Player 5	Player 6	Player 7	Player 8	Player 9
Albirex Niigata (S)	(Japan) Katsuyuki Ishibashi	(Japan) Komei Iida	(Japan) Naoki Yoshioka	(Japan) Nozomi Ozawa	(Japan) Ren Nishimura	(Japan) Shingo Nakano	(Japan) Takumi Yokohata	(Japan) Takahiro Koga	(South Korea) Cho Eun-su
Albirex Niigata (S)	Player 10	Player 11	Player 12	Player 13	Player 14	Player 15	Player 16	Former Players	
Albirex Niigata (S)	(South Korea) Kim Tae-uk	(North Korea) **Ryang Hyon-ju**	(Japan) Soshi Kadowaki (SPL2)					(South Korea) Lee Dong-yeol	
Balestier Khalsa	Player 1	Player 2	Player 3	Player 4	Player 5	Player 6	Player 7	Player 8	Player 9
Balestier Khalsa	(Japan) Masahiro Sugita	(Croatia) Jakov Katuša	(Croatia) Mario Mustapić	(Croatia) Mario Subarić	(Croatia) Tin Matić	(Serbia) Bogdan Mandić	(Serbia) Lazar Vujanić	(Israel) Yanir Ben Eliezer(SPL2)	(Portugal) Tiago Martins (SPL2)
Balestier Khalsa	Player 10	Player 11	Player 12	Player 13	Player 14	Player 15	Player 16	Former Players	
Balestier Khalsa	(Australia) **Hugh Alexander Lobsey** (SPL2)	(Malaysia) Deshan Gunasegara (SPL2)	(Malaysia) Lin Ze Hao (SPL2)					(Nepal) Rijan Rai	
BG Tampines Rovers	Player 1	Player 2	Player 3	Player 4	Player 5	Player 6	Player 7	Player 8	Player 9
BG Tampines Rovers	(Australia) Dylan Fox	(Japan) Hide Higashikawa	(Japan) Koya Kazama	(Japan) Seiga Sumi	(Japan) Shuya Yamashita	(Japan) Takeshi Yoshimoto	(Japan) Talla Ndao	(Japan) **Yuki Kobayashi**	(Malta) Trent Buhagiar
BG Tampines Rovers	Player 10	Player 11	Player 12	Player 13	Player 14	Player 15	Player 16	Former Players	
BG Tampines Rovers	(Australia) Liam Buckley (SPL2)	(United States) Kasey Rogers (SPL2)	(Chinese Taipei) Jasper Chen Hong-An (SPL2)	(India) Aaditya Aprameya (SPL2)				(Thailand) Nalawich Inthacharoen (Thailand) Witthawat Phraothaisong	
Geylang International	Player 1	Player 2	Player 3	Player 4	Player 5	Player 6	Player 7	Player 8	Player 9
Geylang International	(Japan) Kaisei Ogawa	(Japan) Riku Fukashiro	(Japan) Ryoya Taniguchi	(Japan) Shodai Yokoyama	(Japan) Shuhei Hoshino	(South Korea) **Kim Tae-ho**	(South Korea) Ko Jae-hyun	(France) Vincent Bezecourt	(Serbia) Nikola Ignjatovic
Geylang International	Player 10	Player 11	Player 12	Player 13	Player 14	Player 15	Player 16	Former Players	
Geylang International	(Japan) Sho Gamoh (SPL2)	(Japan) **Yu Kanoshima** (SPL2)	(England) **Timothy Cheng** (SPL2)	(Norway) **Abuduryim Abdushukur** (SPL2)					
Hougang United	Player 1	Player 2	Player 3	Player 4	Player 5	Player 6	Player 7	Player 8	Player 9
Hougang United	(Japan) Yuma Suwa	(Ecuador) **Washington Jaramillo**	(Spain) Víctor Blasco	(New Caledonia) **Jaushua Sotirio**	(Thailand) Chonlawit Kanuengkid	(Thailand) Kanok Kongsimma	(Thailand) Parinya Nusong	(Thailand) **Saharat Panmarchya**	(Thailand) Settawut Wongsai
Hougang United	Player 10	Player 11	Player 12	Player 13	Player 14	Player 15	Player 16	Former Players	
Hougang United	(Kenya) Nabilai Kibunguchy	(Tanzania) **Gloire Amanda**	(China) **Yang He**	(Philippines) Neil Charles Callanta (SPL2)	(Philippines) **Aryan Boon** (SPL2)	(Lithuania) Algirdas Karlonas (SPL2)		(United States) Sam Strong, (Thailand) Yotsakorn Burapha, (Japan) Yuta Kikuchi, (Japan) Ryohei Yoshihama, (Japan) Hugo Kametani, (Nigeria) Frank Chiboy Ebele (Nepal) Namsang Rai	
Lion City Sailors	Player 1	Player 2	Player 3	Player 4	Player 5	Player 6	Player 7	Player 8	Player 9
Lion City Sailors	(Australia) Bailey Wright	(Brazil) Anderson Lopes	(Brazil) **Lucas Agueiro**	(Croatia) Ivan Sušak	(Croatia) Toni Datković	(Cameroon) Tsiy-William Ndenge	(Germany) Lennart Thy	(Netherlands) Bart Ramselaar	(Serbia) **Luka Adžić**
Lion City Sailors	Player 10	Player 11	Player 12	Player 13	Player 14	Player 15	Player 16	Former Players	
Lion City Sailors	(Portugal) Diogo Costa	(Portugal) Rui Pires	(Slovenia) **Benjamin Žerak**	(Nepal) **Namsang Rai**	(Nepal) **Rijan Rai**			(Belgium) Maxime Lestienne (Japan) Joshua Little (SPL2)	
Tanjong Pagar United	Player 1	Player 2	Player 3	Player 4	Player 5	Player 6	Player 7	Player 8	Player 9
Tanjong Pagar United	(Australia) Aaron Evans	(Australia) Jesse Daley	(Canada) Matt Silva	(Italy) Junior Djile	(Japan) Shodai Nishikawa	(South Korea) Kim Li-Kwan	(South Korea) **Lee Chan-woo**	(Chinese Taipei) Emilio Estevez	(Timor-Leste) Vabio Canavaro
Tanjong Pagar United	Player 10	Player 11	Player 12	Player 13	Player 14	Player 15	Player 16	Former Players	
Tanjong Pagar United	(Timor-Leste) Zenivio	(Croatia) **Vinnie Ucchino** (SPL2)	(Norway) **Nils Carballeira** (SPL2)					(Switzerland) Aymeric Ngankam (South Korea) Lim Hyun-Sub (Spain) Youssef Ezzejjari (Brazil) Bruno Dybal (Brazil) Guilherme Rodrigues	
Young Lions FC	Player 1	Player 2	Player 3	Player 4	Player 5	Player 6	Player 7	Player 8	Player 9
Young Lions FC	(Brazil) Abner Vinicius	(Brazil) Enrico Walmrath	(Brazil) Joilson	(Brazil) Sergio Mendonça	(England) Harry Spence	(Japan) **Joshua Little**	(Wales) **Kai Whitmore**		
Young Lions FC	Player 10	Player 11	Player 12	Player 13	Player 14	Player 15	Player 16	Former Players	
Young Lions FC								(Brazil) Lucas Agueiro (Slovenia) Benjamin Žerak	

== Results ==
=== League table ===
Pos	Team	Pld	W	D	L	GF	GA	GD	Pts	Qualification or relegation
1	Lion City Sailors (C)	21	16	3	2	70	14	+56	51	Qualification for Champions League Two group stage (Note: Since the winners of the 2025–26 Singapore Cup, Lion City Sailors, qualified for the Champions League Two by league position, the spot reserved for the Singapore Cup winners will pass to the runners-up of the league.)
2	BG Tampines Rovers	21	15	4	2	58	21	+37	49	Qualification for Champions League Two group stage
3	Albirex Niigata (S)	21	15	2	4	47	19	+28	47	
4	Balestier Khalsa	21	11	2	8	44	46	−2	35	
5	Geylang International	21	7	3	11	29	42	−13	24	
6	Hougang United	21	7	0	14	24	41	−17	21	
7	Young Lions (Note: Young Lions cannot qualify for AFC competitions.)	21	2	3	16	15	58	−43	9	
8	Tanjong Pagar United	21	2	1	18	17	63	−46	7	

Updated to match(es) played on 18 May 2026. Source: Singapore Premier League
Rules for classification: 1) points; 2) goal difference; 3) number of goals scored; 4) number of wins
(C) Champions

=== Fixtures and results ===
Teams	ALB	BAL	BGT	GEY	HOU	LCS	TPU	YLI
Albirex Niigata (S)		2–2	3–2	2–0	2–1	3–3	3–2	1–0
Albirex Niigata (S)			2–1				4–0	3–0
Balestier Khalsa	0–4		0–3	5–2	2–3	0–5	2–1	3–1
Balestier Khalsa	2–1				0–3	0–3	6–0	
BG Tampines Rovers	2–1	3–3		0–0	3–0	3–2	2–1	7–1
BG Tampines Rovers		2–1		4–3		0–0		8–1
Geylang International	0–2	3–4	1–3		1–2	0–3	2–1	1–1
Geylang International	1–0	2–3				0–3	2–1	
Hougang United	0–4	1–2	1–2	0–2		1–5 (Note: Match was originally won 5–1 by Lion City Sailors, but was forfeited by Hougang United as they fielded an ineligible player.)	3–0	0–3 (Note: Match was originally won 2–0 by Hougang United, but was forfeited and awarded as a 3–0 win to Young Lions by the Football Association of Singapore Disciplinary Committee on 3 March 2026, as Hougang United fielded an ineligible player.)
Hougang United	0–4		0–1	0–1				
Lion City Sailors	3–0	5–1	1–1	4–0	2–1		7–0	5–1
Lion City Sailors	0–2				4–1			2–0
Tanjong Pagar United	0–2	1–4	0–3	1–3	2–1	0–7		5–1
Tanjong Pagar United			0–3		1–2	0–4		0–1
Young Lions	0–2	1–2	0–5	1–3	0–2	0–2	1–1	
Young Lions		0–2		2–2	0–2			

Updated to match(es) played on 18 May 2026. Source: Singapore Premier League
Legend: Blue = left column team win; Yellow = draw; Red = top row team win.
For upcoming matches, an "a" indicates there is an article about the rivalry between the two participants.

== Statistics ==
=== Top scorers ===
As of 18 May 2026

Rank	Player	Club	Goals
1	(Japan) Shingo Nakano	(Japan) Albirex Niigata (S)	20
2	(Japan) Hide Higashikawa	(Singapore) BG Tampines Rovers	19
3	(Germany) Lennart Thy	(Singapore) Lion City Sailors	15
4	(Brazil) Anderson Lopes	(Singapore) Lion City Sailors	11
5	(Japan) Ryoya Taniguchi	(Singapore) Geylang International	9
6	(Serbia) Bogdan Mandić	(Singapore) Balestier Khalsa	8
6	(Netherlands) Bart Ramselaar	(Singapore) Lion City Sailors	8
6	(Brazil) Sergio Mendonça	(Singapore) Young Lions	8

=== Top assists ===
As of 17 May 2026

Rank	Player	Club	Assists
1	(Japan) Koya Kazama	(Singapore) BG Tampines Rovers	14
2	(Netherlands) Bart Ramselaar	(Singapore) Lion City Sailors	11
3	(Croatia) Jakov Katuša	(Singapore) Balestier Khalsa	10
4	(North Korea) (Japan) Ryang Hyon-ju	(Japan) Albirex Niigata (S)	8
5	(Singapore) Shah Shahiran	(Singapore) BG Tampines Rovers	7

=== Hat-tricks ===
As of 9 May 2026

Player	For	Against	Result (Date)
(Spain) (Morocco) Youssef Ezzejjari ^{4}	Tanjong Pagar United	Young Lions FC	4–1 (25 Sept 2025)
(Japan) Hide Higashikawa ^{4}	BG Tampines Rovers	Young Lions FC	7–1 (16 Jan 2026)
(Japan) Shingo Nakano	Albirex Niigata (S)	Tanjong Pagar United	4–0 (25 Apr 2026)
(Croatia) Tin Matić	Balestier Khalsa	Tanjong Pagar United	5–0 (9 May 2026)

Note ^{4} Player scored 4 goals

=== Clean sheets ===
As of 4 May 2026

Rank	Player	Club	Clean Sheets
1	(Croatia) Ivan Sušak	(Singapore) Lion City Sailors	10
2	(Singapore) Syazwan Buhari	(Singapore) BG Tampines Rovers	7
2	(Singapore) Hassan Sunny	(Japan) Albirex Niigata (S)	7
3	(Singapore) Rudy Khairullah	(Singapore) Geylang International	4

=== Discipline ===
==== Club ====
- Most yellow cards: 13
  - Tanjong Pagar United
- Fewest yellow cards: 5
  - Lion City Sailors
- Most red cards: 3
  - Hougang United
- Fewest red cards: 0
  - Albirex Niigata (S)
  - BG Tampines Rovers
  - Lion City Sailors

== Singapore Premier League Awards ==
Awards	Winners	Team
Player of the Year	(Japan) Hide Higashikawa	BG Tampines Rovers
Young Player of the Year	(Japan) Shingo Nakano	Albirex Niigata (S)
Coach of the Year	(Japan) Keiji Shigetomi	Albirex Niigata (S)
Top Scorer Award	(Japan) Shingo Nakano	Albirex Niigata (S)
Golden Gloves	(Croatia) Ivan Sušak	Lion City Sailors
Goal of the Year	(Singapore) Huzaifah Aziz vs. Lion City Sailors (12/4/2026)	Hougang United
Fair Play Award	(Singapore) BG Tampines Rovers	
Referee of the Year	(Singapore) Syarqawi Buhari	

AIA Team of the Year
Goalkeeper	(Croatia) Ivan Sušak (Lion City Sailors)			
Defence	(Australia) Bailey Wright (Lion City Sailors)		(Croatia) Toni Datković (Lion City Sailors)	(Japan) Takeshi Yoshimoto (Tampines Rovers)
Midfield	(Japan) Yuki Kobayashi (Tampines Rovers)	(Japan) Koya Kazama (Tampines Rovers)	(Singapore) Shah Shahiran (Tampines Rovers)	(Netherlands) Bart Ramselaar (Lion City Sailors)
Attack	(Japan) Hide Higashikawa (BG Tampines Rovers)		(Japan) Shingo Nakano (Albirex Niigata (S))	(Germany) Lennart Thy (Lion City Sailors)
