= Ivan Sušak =

Croatian footballer

Personal information
- Date of birth: 6 October 1997 (age 29)
- Place of birth: Metković, Croatia
- Height: 2.03 m (6 ft 8 in)
- Position: Goalkeeper

Team information
- Current team: Lion City Sailors
- Number: 25

Youth career
- –2016: GOŠK Gabela

Senior career*
Years	Team	Apps	(Gls)
2016	Sesvete	0	(0)
2016	Trnje	0	(0)
2017–2019	Sesvete	21	(0)
2017–2018	→ Dugo Selo (loan)	0	(0)
2019–2020	Zagorec Krapina	0	(0)
2020	Dynamo České Budějovice	0	(0)
2020–2021	Rudeš	12	(0)
2021	Maribor	0	(0)
2021–2025	Slaven Belupo	85	(0)
2025–	Lion City Sailors	22	(0)
- * Club domestic league appearances and goals as of 1 November 2026

Ivan Sušak (born 6 October 1997) is a Croatian professional footballer who plays as a goalkeeper for Singapore Premier League club Lion City Sailors.

== Club career ==
Sušak previously played for clubs in the Prva NL including Sesvete and Rudeš.

On 28 April 2017, Sušak make his professional career debut in a 1–0 win over Gorica which he kept a clean sheet. After main goalkeeper Ivan Filipovic loan contract ended, Sušak became the club first choice goalkeeper in the 2018–19 season.

Sušak joined Croatian Football League club Slaven Belupo on 14 July 2021. He made over 89 appearances over four seasons, with his most impressive coming in the recent 2024–25 campaign where he kept 10 clean sheets in 35 matches across all competitions where he captained Slaven Belupo on several occasions. His leadership and performances earned him a place in the Croatian Football League 'Team of the Season', as Slaven finished fifth — their best league finish in 12 years.

On 10 July 2025, Sušak signed for Singapore Premier League club Lion City Sailors. During the final of the 2025–26 Singapore Cup against Tampines Rovers on 10 January 2026, he assisted Anderson Lopes after a long punt in final seconds of extra time which seal a 2–0 win for Lion City Sailors. Later in the league match against Young Lions on 8 February, Sušak assisted Lennart Thy to secure a 2–0 win. On 28 February, Lion City Sailors faced off against Albirex Niigata (S) where the team was 3–2 down, Sušak went up into the opposition box during a corner kick where he scored and rescued Lion City Sailors to a 3–3 draw. Sušak goal made him the first goalkeeper to score in the league.

== Honours ==
=== Club ===
Lion City Sailors

- Singapore Community Shield runner-up: 2025
- Singapore Cup: 2025–26
- Singapore Premier League: 2025–26

=== Individual ===
- Croatian Football League Team of the Year: 2024–25
- Singapore Premier League Team of the Year: 2025–26
- Singapore Premier League Golden Glove: 2025–26
