= Jakov Katuša =

Croatian footballer (born 2000)

Personal information
- Date of birth: 29 December 2000 (age 25)
- Place of birth: Zadar, Croatia
- Height: 1.85 m (6 ft 1 in)
- Position: Winger

Team information
- Current team: Balestier Khalsa FC
- Number: 22

Youth career
- –2014: NK Zadar
- 2014–2015: NK Murvica
- 2015–2016: NK Zadar
- 2016: NK Primorac 1929
- 2016–2019: NK Zadar

Senior career*
Years	Team	Apps	(Gls)
2018–2019	NK Zadar	7	(0)
2019–2020	NK Slaven Belupo II		
2020	HNK Zadar		
2020–2021	NK Mladost Ždralovi		
2021	ND Beltinci	7	(2)
2021–2022	NK Fužinar	25	(9)
2022–2023	NK Aluminij	41	(6)
2024	ND Beltinci	12	(4)
2024–2025	CSM Ceahlăul Piatra Neamț	8	(0)
2025–	Balestier Khalsa FC	25	(7)
- * Club domestic league appearances and goals as of 21 November 2026

Jakov Katuša (born 29 December 2000) is a Croatian professional footballer who plays as a winger for Balestier Khalsa FC.

== Early life ==
Katuša was born on 29 December 2000 in Zadar, Croatia. A native of the city, he is the son of Croatian footballer Velimir Katuša.

== Career ==
As a youth player, Katuša joined the youth academy of Croatian side NK Zadar in 2016 and was promoted to the club's senior team in 2018, where he made seven league appearances and scored zero goals. Following his stint there, he signed for Slovenian side ND Beltinci in 2021, where he made seven league appearances and scored two goals.

During the summer of 2024, he signed for Romanian side CSM Ceahlăul Piatra Neamț, where he made eight league appearances and scored zero goals. Ahead of the 2025–26 season, he signed for Singaporean side Balestier Khalsa FC.

== Career statistics ==
=== Club ===
As of 21 November 2026.

Club	Season	League			Cup		Continental		Other		Total	
Club	Season	Division	Apps	Goals	Apps	Goals	Apps	Goals	Apps	Goals	Apps	Goals
Balestier Khalsa	2025–26	Singapore Premier League	18	6	4	2	0	0	0	0	22	8
Balestier Khalsa	2026–27	Singapore Premier League	7	1	0	0	0	0	0	0	7	1
Balestier Khalsa	Total		25	7	4	2	0	0	0	0	29	9
Career total			25	7	4	2	0	0	0	0	29	9

== Style of play ==
Katuša plays as a winger. Singaporean newspaper The Straits Times wrote in 2026 that he "has a keen eye for a penetrative pass and long-range shots".
