= Lucie Lefebvre =

Canadian artist

- Born: 1956 (age 68–69); Quebec City, Quebec

Lucie Lefebvre (born 1956) is a Canadian artist.

Her work is included in the collections of the Musée national des beaux-arts du Québec and the National Gallery of Canada.
