= Yuma Suwa =

Japanese footballer

Personal information
- Date of birth: 29 August 2000 (age 26)
- Place of birth: Kashima, Ibaraki, Japan
- Positions: Central midfielder; right-back

College career
Years	Team	Apps	(Gls)
2016–2018	Jissen Gakuen High School		
2019	SC Sagamihara U21		

Senior career*
Years	Team	Apps	(Gls)
2020	SC Schwaz		
2021–2023	FK Kauno Žalgiris	30	(1)
2023–2024	FK Kolubara	8	(0)
2024–2025	FK Bokelj	28	(1)
2025-2026	Hougang United	21	(0)
- * Club domestic league appearances and goals as of 27 October 2025

Yuma Suwa (諏訪 悠磨, Suwa Yuma; born 29 August 2000), better known as Yuma, is a Japanese professional footballer who plays either as a right-back or central-midfielder most recently for Singapore Premier League club Hougang United.

== Career ==
He graduated from Jissen Gakuen High School and joined SC Sagamihara U21.

In 2020, he joined SC Schwaz in the Austrian third division, before moving to OFK Grbalj in the Montenegrin Second League in 2021.

In the summer of the same year , he made a permanent move to A Lyga club FK Kauno Žalgiris , where he is a regular spot in the starting lineup .

In February 2024 , he transferred to FK Kolubara in the Serbian League Belgrade along with Akira Matsui . Suwa and Matsui were also teammates during their time at Schwaz.

In the summer of the same year, he made a permanent move to FK Bokelj, a club in the Montenegrin First League .

== Career statistics ==
=== Club ===
As of 27 October 2025

Club	Season	League			FA Cup		League Cup		Continential		Total	
Club	Season	Division	Apps	Goals	Apps	Goals	Apps	Goals	Apps	Goals	Apps	Goals
FK Kauno Žalgiris	2021	A Lyga	10	0	0	0	0	0	1	0	11	0
FK Kauno Žalgiris	2022	A Lyga	8	0	0	0	0	0	0	0	8	0
FK Kauno Žalgiris	2023	A Lyga	12	1	2	0	1	0	0	0	15	1
FK Kauno Žalgiris	Total		30	1	2	0	1	0	1	0	34	1
FK Kolubara	2023–24	Serbian First League	8	0	0	0	0	0	0	0	8	0
FK Kolubara	Total		8	0	0	0	0	0	0	0	8	0
FK Bokelj	2024–25	Montenegrin First League	28	1	2	0	0	0	0	0	30	1
FK Bokelj	Total		28	1	2	0	0	0	0	0	30	1
Hougang United	2025–26	Singapore Premier League	5	0	1	0	0	0	0	0	6	0
Hougang United	Total		5	0	1	0	0	0	0	0	6	0
Career total			71	2	5	0	1	0	1	0	78	2
