= Talla Ndao =

Japanese footballer (born 1999)

Personal information
- Date of birth: 23 December 1999 (age 26)
- Height: 1.86 m (6 ft 1 in)
- Position: Forward

Team information
- Current team: Muang Loei United
- Number: 9

Youth career
- 2014–2016: Sapporo Sosei High School

College career
Years	Team	Apps	(Gls)
2017–2020	Niigata University of Health and Welfare		

Senior career*
Years	Team	Apps	(Gls)
2021–2022	Yokohama F. Marinos	1	(0)
2021	→ FC Machida Zelvia (loan)	2	(0)
2022	→ FC Maruyasu Okazaki (loan)	17	(6)
2023–2024	FC Osaka	2	(0)
2023–2024	→ FC Maruyasu Okazaki (loan)	19	(4)
2025	Naxxar Lions FC	8	(0)
2025–2026	Tampines Rovers FC	3	(0)
2026–	Muang Loei United	0	(0)
- * Club domestic league appearances and goals as of 13 September 2026

Talla Ndao (Japanese: ンダウ ターラ; born 23 December 1999) is a Japanese professional footballer who plays as a forward for Muang Loei United.

== Early life ==
Ndao was born on 23 December 1999. Born to a Senegalese father and a Japanese mother, he grew up in Hokkaido, Japan. Growing up, he attended Sapporo Sosei High School in Japan before attending Niigata University of Health and Welfare in Japan.

== Career ==
Ndao started his career with Japanese side Yokohama F. Marinos, where he made one league appearance and scored zero goals. In 2021, he was sent on loan to Japanese side FC Machida Zelvia, where he made two league appearances and scored zero goals. During the summer of 2022, he was sent on loan to Japanese side FC Maruyasu Okazaki, where he made seventeen league appearances and scored six goals.

Ahead of the 2023 season, he signed for Japanese side FC Osaka, where he made two league appearances and scored zero goals. Following his stint there, he signed for Maltese side Naxxar Lions FC. Subsequently, he signed for Singaporean side Tampines Rovers FC.

== Style of play ==
Ndao plays as a forward. Right-footed, he is known for his speed and strength. where he made eight league appearances and scored zero goals. Subsequently, he signed for Singaporean side Tampines Rovers FC in 2025.
