= Hide Higashikawa =

Japanese footballer

Personal information
- Date of birth: 13 July 2002 (age 24)
- Place of birth: Kanagawa, Japan
- Position: Striker

Team information
- Current team: Tampines Rovers
- Number: 25

Senior career*
Years	Team	Apps	(Gls)
2025	Tochigi City	10	(0)
2025–	BG Tampines Rovers	20	(19)
- * Club domestic league appearances and goals as of 25 Aug 2025

Hide Higashikawa (born July 13, 2002) is a Japanese professional footballer who plays as a striker for Singapore Premier League club BG Tampines Rovers

== Club career ==
=== Tochigi City ===
Hide graduated from Kokushikan University, before joining Tochigi City, which played in the J3 League in 2025.

On 15 February 2025, Hide made his J.League debut in the J3 League opening match against SC Sagamihara . He played in nine J3 League matches in the first half of the 2025 season.

=== Tampines Rovers ===
On 27 June 2025, Hide joined Singapore club Tampines Rovers on a one-year loan deal. He became one of the new Japanese contingent after new chairman Shungo Sakamoto take over.

On his debut for the club in the 2025 Singapore Community Shield, he scored his first professional goal in a 4–1 win over Lion City Sailors.On 23 October 2025, Hide scored a goal just 15 seconds into the match against Korean club Pohang Steelers in the third match of Group H of the AFC Champions League Two becoming the fastest goal in the tournament history. He scored his first career hat-trick in a 3–2 win over Thailand club BG Pathum United in the 2025–26 ASEAN Club Championship on 3 December 2025. Hide the scored four goals in single match during a league game against Young Lions on 16 January 2026 in a 7–1 thrashing win. Following an impressive debut season where he scored 19 goals in 20 league games, Hide was duly named the 2025-26 SPL Player of the Year. He also scored six goals in nine games on the continental stage, helping the stags reach the quarter-finals of the AFC Champions League Two. Following the conclusion of the season, Hide was announced as a permanent signing for the stags, joining on a 2-year contract.

== Personal life ==
Hide's father is former professional footballer Yoshinori Higashikawa, who is currently coaching the Zweigen Kanazawa under-18 side.

== Career statistics ==
=== Club ===
As of 25 Aug 2025

Club	Season	League			FA Cup		League Cup		Continental		Total	
Club	Season	Division	Apps	Goals	Apps	Goals	Apps	Goals	Apps	Goals	Apps	Goals
Tochigi City	2025	J3 League	9	0	1	0	0	0	0	0	10	0
Tochigi City	Total		9	0	1	0	0	0	0	0	10	0
Tampines Rovers	2025–26	Singapore Premier League	20	19	3	1	-	-	9	6	38	26
Tampines Rovers	Total		20	19	3	1	1	0	9	9	38	26
Career total			29	19	4	1	1	0	9	9	48	26

== Honours ==
=== Club ===
==== Tampines Rovers ====
- Singapore Community Shield: 2025

=== Individual ===
- Singapore Premier League Player of the Year: 2025–26
- Singapore Premier League Team of the Year: 2025–26
