= Seiga Sumi =

Japanese footballer

Personal information
- Date of birth: 11 June 2002 (age 24)
- Place of birth: Aichi, Japan
- Height: 1.87 m (6 ft 2 in)
- Position: Defensive midfielder

Team information
- Current team: BG Tampines Rovers
- Number: 7

Youth career
- 2018–2020: Nagoya Grampus

College career
Years	Team	Apps	(Gls)
2021–2024	Meiji University		

Senior career*
Years	Team	Apps	(Gls)
2024–	Fagiano Okayama	0	(0)
2025–	BG Tampines Rovers	10	(2)
- * Club domestic league appearances and goals as of 3 August 2025

Seiga Sumi (Japanese: 鷲見 星河; born June 11, 2002) is a Japanese professional footballer who plays primarily defensive-midfielder for Singapore Premier League club Tampines Rovers.

== Club career ==
=== Fagiano Okayama ===
In December 2024, Sumi joined Fagiano Okayama, which had just been promoted to J1 League for the 2025 season. However, he did not play in any league matches or cup matches in the 2025 season for the team.

=== Tampines Rovers ===
On 24 June 2025, Sumi announced a temporary transfer to Tampines Rovers of the Singapore Premier League.

Sumi made his debut appearance for Tampines Rovers in the 2025 Singapore Community Shield. He provided an assist to fellow new signing Maltese footballer, Trent Buhagiar, to score his second goal of the match, taking a 2–0 lead in the match. Tampines Rovers eventually won the match 4–1.

== Career statistics ==
=== Club ===
As of 21 Jun 2023.

Club	Season	League			Cup		AFC		Total	
Club	Season	Division	Apps	Goals	Apps	Goals	Apps	Goals	Apps	Goals
Fagiano Okayama	2025	J1 League	0	0	0	0	0	0	0	0
Fagiano Okayama	Total		0	0	0	0	0	0	0	0
BG Tampines Rovers	2025–26	Singapore Premier League	2	0	1 (Note: Appearance in Community Shield)	0	3 (Note: 2 matches in Shopee Cup & 1 match in ACL 2)	0	6	0
BG Tampines Rovers	Total		2	0	1	0	3	0	6	0
Career total			2	0	1	0	3	0	6	0

== Honours ==
=== Club ===
==== Tampines Rovers ====
- Singapore Community Shield : 2025
