= Koya Kazama =

Japanese footballer (born 1993)

Koya Kazama 風間 宏矢
Personal information
- Full name: Koya Kazama
- Date of birth: 16 April 1993 (age 33)
- Place of birth: Fuchū, Hiroshima, Japan
- Height: 1.80 m (5 ft 11 in)
- Position: Midfielder

Team information
- Current team: Tampines Rovers

Youth career
- 2006–2008: Shimizu FC
- 2009–2011: Shimizu Shogyo High School

Senior career*
Years	Team	Apps	(Gls)
2012	VfL Osnabrück		
2012–2013	Kawasaki Frontale	13	(0)
2014–2015	Oita Trinita	46	(8)
2015	→ Gifu (loan)	15	(1)
2016–2019	Gifu	115	(17)
2019	→ FC Ryukyu (loan)	15	(2)
2020–2021	FC Ryukyu	84	(15)
2022–2025	JEF United Chiba	82	(5)
2025–	Tampines Rovers	0	(0)
- * Club domestic league appearances and goals as of 3 February 2025, 12:22 (UTC)

Koya Kazama (風間 宏矢, Kazama Kōya; born 16 April 1993) is a Japanese footballer who plays as a midfielder for Singapore Premier League club Tampines Rovers.

== Club career ==
On 9 January 2022, Koya joined J2 club, JEF United Chiba as permanent transfer.

On 16 June 2025, Koya moved to Southeast Asia to join Singaporean club Tampines Rovers.

== Personal life ==
Koya comes from a footballing family. His elder brother Koki is also a professional footballer currently playing for J3 League club, Thespa Gunma. His father Yahiro is a former professional footballer and currently manager of Kantō Soccer League Division 1 team, Nankatsu SC.

== Career statistics ==
=== Club ===
As of 16 June 2025.

Club performance			League		Cup		League Cup		Others		Total	
Club	Season	League	Apps	Goals	Apps	Goals	Apps	Goals	Apps	Goals	Apps	Goals
Japan			League		Emperor's Cup		J. League Cup		Others		Total	
Kawasaki Frontale	2012	J.League Div 1	10	0	2	0	-		0	0	12	0
Kawasaki Frontale	2013	J.League Div 1	3	0	1	0	3	0	0	0	7	0
Kawasaki Frontale	Total		13	0	3	0	3	0	0	0	19	0
Oita Trinita	2014	J League Div 2	34	6	2	1	0	0	–		36	7
Oita Trinita	2015	J League Div 2	12	2	0	0	–				12	2
Oita Trinita	Total		46	8	2	1	0	0	0	0	50	9
FC Gifu (loan)	2014	J League Div 2	15	1	0	0	0	0	–		15	1
FC Gifu	2016	J League Div 2	30	4	1	1	0	0	–		31	5
FC Gifu	2017	J League Div 2	28	6	1	0	0	0	–		29	6
FC Gifu	2018	J League Div 2	38	5	1	1	0	0	–		39	6
FC Gifu	2019	J League Div 2	19	2	1	0	0	0	–		20	2
FC Gifu	Total		130	18	4	2	0	0	0	0	134	20
FC Ryukyu (loan)	2019	J League Div 2	15	2	0	0	0	0	–		15	2
FC Ryukyu	2020	J League Div 2	42	10	0	0	0	0	–		42	10
FC Ryukyu	2021	J League Div 2	42	5	0	0	0	0	–		42	5
FC Ryukyu	Total		99	17	0	0	0	0	0	0	99	17
JEF United Chiba	2022	J League Div 2	25	1	1	0	0	0	–		26	1
JEF United Chiba	2023	J League Div 2	38	4	0	0	0	0	–		38	4
JEF United Chiba	2024	J League Div 2	19	0	3	1	1	0	0	0	23	1
JEF United Chiba	2025	J League Div 2	1	0	0	0	1	0	0	0	2	0
JEF United Chiba	Total		83	5	4	1	2	0	0	0	89	6
Club	Season	League			Singapore Cup		League Cup & AFF		AFC & ACL		Total	
Club	Season	Division	Apps	Goals	Apps	Goals	Apps	Goals	Apps	Goals	Apps	Goals
Tampines Rovers	2025–26	Singapore Premier League	0	0	0	0	0	0	0	0	0	0
Tampines Rovers	Total		0	0	0	0	0	0	0	0	0	0
Career total			371	48	13	4	5	0	0	0	389	52

== Honours ==
=== Tampines Rovers ===
- Singapore Community Shield: 2025
