= Datković =

Datković is a Croatian surname. Notable people with the surname include:

- Marin Datković (born 1988), Croatian footballer, brother of Toni
- Niko Datković (born 1993), Croatian footballer
- Toni Datković (born 1993), Croatian footballer
