= 2025 Lion City Sailors Youth season =

Lion City Sailors
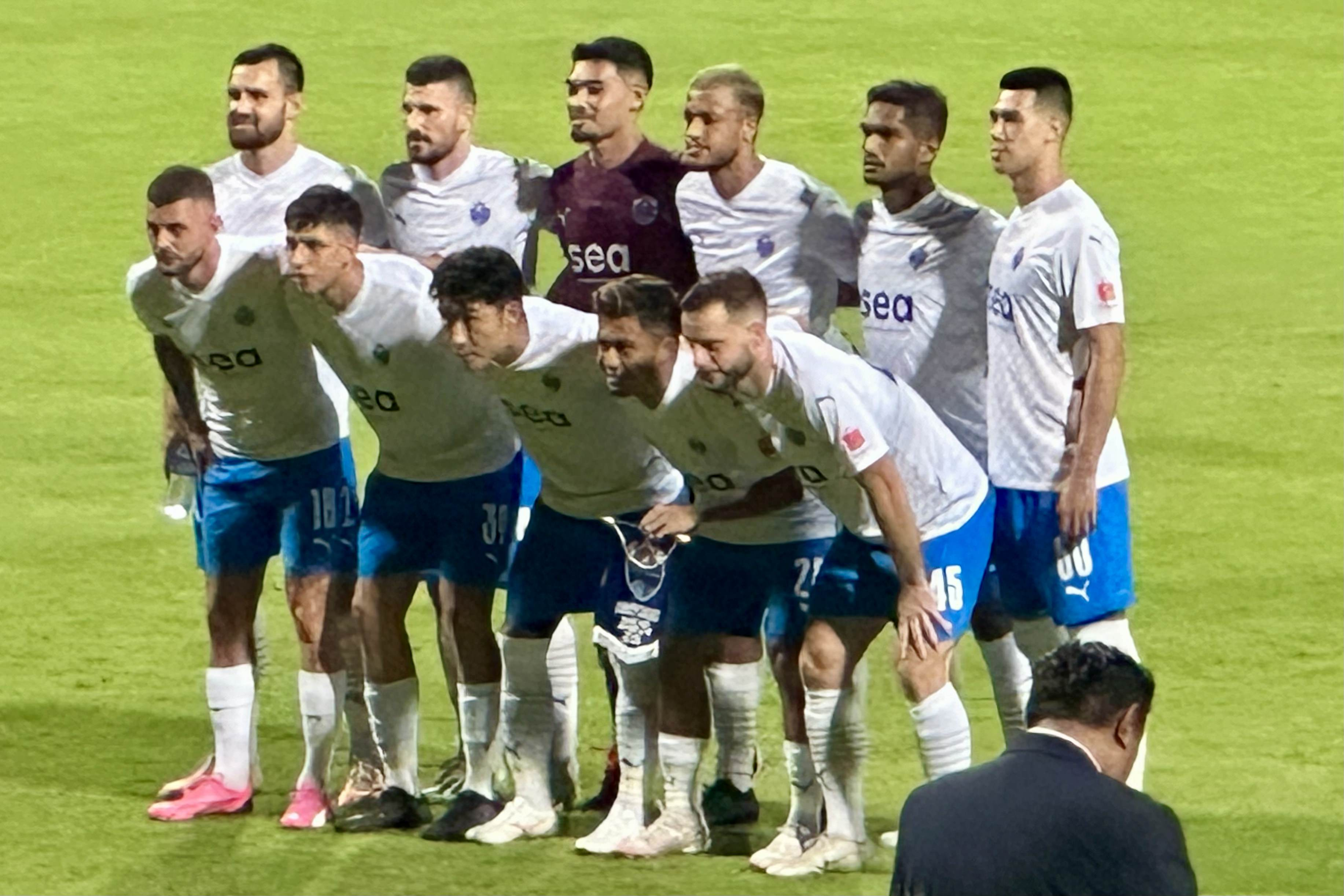
- Match between Lion City Sailors and Johor Darul Ta'zim
- Owner: Sea Limited
- Chairman: Forrest Li
- Head coach: (Serbia) Aleksandar Ranković (till 6 February) (Spain) Varo Moreno (till 23 February) (Spain) Jesús Casas
- Stadium: Bishan Stadium
Home colours	Away colours

The 2025–26 season is Lion City Sailors' 30th consecutive season in the Singapore Premier League and the 6th season since privatising from Home United. Their youth team played in U21 league.

== Squad ==
=== Singapore Premier League ===
As of 10 June 2025

Squad No.	Name	Nationality	Date of Birth (Age)	Previous Club	Contract Since	Contract End
Goalkeepers
12	Benjamin Žerak	(Slovenia)	14 December 2006 (age 19)	(Singapore) Young Lions	2025	2027
13	Adib Azahari	(Singapore)	9 March 1998 (age 28)	(Singapore) Young Lions	2020	2027
25	Ivan Sušak	(Croatia)	6 October 1997 (age 29)	(Croatia) Slaven Belupo	2025	2027
Defenders
4	Toni Datković	(Croatia)	6 November 1993 (age 33)	(Spain) Albacete	2024	2027
5	Lionel Tan	(Singapore)	5 June 1997 (age 29)	(Singapore) Hougang United	2023	2026
11	Hafiz Nor (3rd captain)	(Singapore)	22 August 1988 (age 38)	(Singapore) Warriors	2018	2026
20	Nur Adam Abdullah	(Singapore)	13 April 2001 (age 25)	(Singapore) Young Lions	2021	2027
22	Christopher van Huizen	(Singapore)	28 November 1992 (age 33)	(Singapore) Tampines Rovers	2023	2025
26	Bailey Wright (vice-captain)	(Australia)	28 July 1992 (age 34)	(England) Sunderland	2023	2027
29	Diogo Costa	(Portugal)	27 July 2003 (age 23)	(Portugal) Famalicão	2025	2030
30	Akram Azman	(Singapore)	21 November 2000 (age 25)	(Singapore) Tanjong Pagar United	2025	2026
Midfielders
6	Tsiy-William Ndenge	(Germany) (Cameroon)	13 June 1997 (age 29)	(Switzerland) Grasshopper	2025	2027
8	Rui Pires	(Portugal)	22 March 1998 (age 28)	(Portugal) Paços de Ferreira	2023	2026
10	Bart Ramselaar	(Netherlands)	29 June 1996 (age 30)	(Netherlands) Utrecht	2024	2026
14	Hariss Harun (captain)	(Singapore)	9 November 1990 (age 35)	(Malaysia) Johor Darul Ta'zim	2021	2027
15	Song Ui-young	(Singapore) (South Korea)	8 November 1993 (age 33)	(Indonesia) Persebaya Surabaya	2024	2027
16	Hami Syahin	(Singapore)	16 December 1998 (age 27)	(Singapore) Young Lions	2019	2027
33	Lucas Agueiro	(Brazil)	13 July 2004 (age 22)	(Singapore) Young Lions	2025	2026
46	Kyoga Nakamura	(Singapore) (Japan)	25 April 1996 (age 30)	(Thailand) Bangkok United	2026	2028
	Nur Muhammad Asis	(Singapore)	4 March 2004 (age 22)	(Portugal) Estrela U23	2022	2026
Forwards
7	Shawal Anuar	(Singapore)	29 April 1991 (age 35)	(Singapore) Hougang United	2023	2027
9	Lennart Thy	(Germany)	25 February 1992 (age 34)	(Netherlands) PEC Zwolle	2024	2026
18	Anderson Lopes	(Brazil)	15 September 1993 (age 33)	(Japan) Yokohama F. Marinos	2025	2028
28	Luka Adžić	(Serbia)	17 September 1998 (age 28)	(Thailand) Bangkok United	2026	2026
Players on loan / NS
1	Izwan Mahbud	(Singapore)	14 July 1990 (age 36)	(Singapore) Hougang United	2022	2025
19	Zulqarnaen Suzliman	(Singapore)	29 March 1998 (age 28)	(Singapore) Young Lions	2020	2025
28	Zharfan Rohaizad	(Singapore)	21 February 1997 (age 29)	(Singapore) Tanjong Pagar United	2023	2025
31	Abdul Rasaq	(Singapore) (Nigeria)	16 June 2001 (age 25)	(Singapore) Young Lions	2023	2027
41	Joshua Little	(Republic of Ireland) (Japan)	30 October 2007 (age 19)	(Singapore) Lion City Sailors U21	2022	2026
80	Nathan Mao	(Singapore)	26 March 2008 (age 18)	(Singapore) Lion City Sailors U21	2022	2026
Players who left mid-season
17	Maxime Lestienne	(Belgium)	17 June 1992 (age 34)	(Belgium) Standard Liège	2022	2025
21	Safuwan Baharudin	(Singapore)	22 September 1991 (age 35)	(Malaysia) Selangor	2025	2026

Remarks:
^{FP U21} These players are registered as U21 foreign players.

=== Singapore Premier League 2 ===
As of 10 June 2025

Squad No.	Name	Nationality	Date of Birth (Age)	Previous Club	Contract Since	Contract End
Goalkeepers
51	Efan Qiszman	(Singapore)	20 September 2006 (age 20)	(Singapore) Balestier Khalsa U21	2025	2026
61	Seth Lee	(Singapore)	12 January 2007 (age 19)	(Singapore) Balestier Khalsa U21	2025	2026
71	Nor Aqmar Shamil	(Singapore)	24 June 2007 (age 19)	(Singapore) BG Tampines Rovers U21	2025	2026
Defenders
52	Akmal Azman	(Singapore)	21 November 2000 (age 25)	(Singapore) Geylang International	2025	2026
53	Danish Irfan	(Singapore)	10 March 1999 (age 27)	(Singapore) Hougang United	2025	2026
54	Aaryan Fikri	(Singapore)	5 September 2007 (age 19)	(Singapore) Balestier Khalsa U21	2025	2026
57	Ikmal Hazlan	(Singapore)	11 January 2007 (age 19)	(Singapore) Young Lions FC	2025	2026
62	Raiyan Izdihar	(Singapore)	9 March 2007 (age 19)	(Singapore) Balestier Khalsa U21	2025	2026
74	Adrian Jaccard	(Singapore)	30 October 2006 (age 20)	(Singapore) BG Tampines Rovers U21	2026	2026
75	Alexander Koh	(Singapore)	2 January 2008 (age 18)	(Singapore) Sailors Development U17	2025	2026
82	Karlheinz Oma Koppe	(Singapore) (Germany)	14 July 2008 (age 18)	(Singapore) Sailors Development U17	2024	2026
83	Aaryan Irzan	(Singapore)	30 December 2008 (age 17)	(Singapore) BG Tampines Rovers U17	2026	2026
84	Caleb Tan Kai Zhe	(Singapore)	25 January 2008 (age 18)	(Singapore) Sailors Development U17	2022	2026
85	Ziqry Eizyanshah Azam	(Singapore)	6 August 2008 (age 18)	(Singapore) Sailors Development U17	2024	2026
Midfielders
55	Izz Anaqi	(Singapore)	17 August 2002 (age 24)	(Singapore) Young Lions FC	2025	2026
59	Aiman Zayani	(Singapore)	28 February 2007 (age 19)	(Singapore) Balestier Khalsa U21	2025	2026
60	Yasir Nizamudin	(Singapore)	21 January 2005 (age 21)	(Singapore) Lion City Sailors U21	2022	2026
63	Ahmad Danial	(Singapore)	16 November 2005 (age 20)	(Singapore) Tanjong Pagar United U21	2025	2026
65	Brayden Khng	(Singapore)	9 September 2007 (age 19)	(Singapore) Balestier Khalsa U21	2025	2026
72	Ryan Lim Zong Han	(Singapore)	19 May 2006 (age 20)	Singapore Cricket Club	2025	2026
78	Xavier Tan Shan Yang	(Singapore)	7 January 2008 (age 18)	(Singapore) Sailors Development U17	2023	2026
80	Rijan Rai	(Singapore) (Nepal)		(Singapore) Balestier Khalsa	2026	2026
87	Sean Luke Ong	(Singapore)	15 January 2008 (age 18)	(Singapore) ActiveSG Academy U17	2023	2026
Forwards
58	Namsang Rai	(Singapore) (Nepal)	9 March 2006 (age 20)	(Singapore) Hougang United U21	2025	2026
66	Naufal Azman	(Singapore)	10 July 1998 (age 28)	(Singapore) Geylang International	2025	2026
67	Syafiq Asaraf	(Singapore)	12 June 2000 (age 26)	(Singapore) Jungfrau Punggol	2025	2026
68	Adam Faisal	(Singapore)	29 May 2007 (age 19)	(Singapore) Balestier Khalsa U21	2025	2026
77	Jadon Quah Song Yee	(Singapore)	20 April 2008 (age 18)	(Singapore) Sailors Development U17	2023	2026
Players on loan / NS
51	Ashman Saravanan	(Singapore) (Malaysia)	5 March 2008 (age 18)	(Malaysia) JDT Academy	2024	2026
53	Ainun Nuha Ilyasir	(Singapore)	11 March 2006 (age 20)	(Singapore) Lion City Sailors U17	2022	2026
54	Harith Luth Hadi	(Singapore)	19 March 2008 (age 18)	(Singapore) Lion City Sailors U17	2022	2026
55	Jonan Tan En Yuan	(Singapore)	27 June 2006 (age 20)	(Portugal) Estrela U23	2022	2026
56	Muhammad Fadly	(Singapore)	30 May 2007 (age 19)	(Singapore) Lion City Sailors U17	2023	2026
57	Enrico Walmrath Silveira	(Brazil)	6 April 2006 (age 20)	(Singapore) Lion City Sailors U17	2023	2026
58	Iliya Naufal	(Singapore)	6 July 2008 (age 18)	Singapore Sports School	2024	2026
59	Ilhan Rizqullah	(Singapore)	17 September 2008 (age 18)	(Singapore) Lion City Sailors U17	2022	2026
61	Andy Reefqy	(Singapore)	14 July 2008 (age 18)	Singapore Sports School	2023	2026
64	Harith Danish Irwan	(Singapore)	27 November 2008 (age 17)	Singapore Sports School	2024	2026
66	Sarrvin Raj	(Singapore)	5 April 2008 (age 18)	(Singapore) Lion City Sailors U15	2022	2026
67	Izzan Rifqi	(Singapore)	4 March 2010 (age 16)	(Singapore) Lion City Sailors U17	2022	2026
63	Idzham Eszuan	(Singapore)	14 February 2007 (age 19)	Lion City Sailors U17	2022	2026
67	Issac Goh Jun Yang	(Singapore)	5 June 2007 (age 19)	(Singapore) Lion City Sailors U15	2022	2026
70	Kieran Aryan Azhari	(Singapore)	31 May 2003 (age 23)	(Singapore) Lion City Sailors U17	2021	2026
71	Yazid Rais	(Singapore)	16 March 2006 (age 20)	(Singapore) Lion City Sailors U17	2022	2026
71	Kian Ghadessy	(Singapore) (England) (Iran)	30 November 2005 (age 20)	(Singapore) Balestier Khalsa U21	2024	2026
72	Ilyasin Zayan	(Singapore) (England)	22 March 2004 (age 22)	(Singapore) Young Lions	2022	2026
74	Tiago Martins	(Portugal)	8 February 2005 (age 21)	(Portugal) AVS Futebol SAD U19	2024	2026
75	Harry Spence	(England)	15 March 2006 (age 20)	(England) Hull City U18	2024	2026
76	Farrel Mohammad	(Singapore)	15 March 2009 (age 17)	(Singapore) Lion City Sailors U17	2022	2026
78	Danie Hafiy	(Singapore)	6 April 2004 (age 22)	(Singapore) Young Lions	2022	2026
79	Aniq Raushan	(Singapore)	5 October 2003 (age 23)	(Singapore) Young Lions	2021	2026
	Marcus Mosses	(Singapore)	21 January 2005 (age 21)	(Singapore) Tanjong Pagar United	2022	2027
	Fernandez Casey Klein	(Singapore) (Germany)	5 February 2007 (age 19)	(Singapore) Lion City Sailors U21	2023	2026
	Izrafil Yusof	(Singapore)	27 January 2004 (age 22)	(Singapore) Young Lions	2022	2027
	Aniq Tiryaq	(Singapore)	10 October 2006 (age 20)	(Singapore) Lion City Sailors U17	2021	2025
	Aqil Khusni	(Singapore)	23 April 2004 (age 22)	(Singapore) Mattar Sailors	2022	2026
	Uchenna Eziakor	(Singapore) (Nigeria)	17 May 2008 (age 18)	(Spain) ESC La Liga Academy	2022	2026
Players who left mid-season
56	Jan Tze Soong	(Singapore)	17 November 2007 (age 18)	(Singapore) Balestier Khalsa U21	2025	2026
64	Umar Ramle	(Singapore)	2 May 1996 (age 30)	(Singapore) Tanjong Pagar United	2025	2026
70	Faisal Shahril	(Singapore)	7 May 1997 (age 29)	(Singapore) Geylang International	2025	2026
79	Justin Hui Yong Kang	(Singapore)	17 February 1998 (age 28)	(Singapore) Hougang United	2025	2026

Remarks:
^{FP U21} These players are registered as U21 foreign players.

=== U19 squad ===
Squad No.	Name	Nationality	Date of Birth (Age)	Previous Club	Contract Since	Contract End
Goalkeepers
	Kenneth Ng ^{U19}	(Singapore)	6 February 2009 (age 17)	(Singapore) Albirex Jurong U17	2026	2026
	Emre Masjuri ^{U19}	(Singapore)	2009	(Singapore) Sailors Development U17	2023	2025
	Ang Siew Ee ^{U19}	(Singapore)	2008	(Singapore) Sailors Development U17	2025	2025
	Kaden Foo Kai Jun ^{U19}	(Singapore)	2008	(Singapore) Sailors Development U17	2023	2025
	Kaiden Ng ^{U21}	(Singapore)	17 October 2006 (age 20)	(Singapore) Lion City Sailors U15	2023	2023
Defenders
Midfielders
Forwards
70	Ewan Seddon ^{U21}	(England) (Japan)	1 November 2008 (age 18)	(Singapore) Lion City Sailors U17	2024	2025
73	Ahmad Luthfi Rusfatzilella ^{U21}	(Singapore)	15 August 2007 (age 19)	Singapore Sports School	2023	2025
Players loaned out
Players left during the season

=== U17 / AFA DC U17 squad ===
Squad No.	Name	Nationality	Date of Birth (Age)	Previous Club	Contract Since	Contract End
Goalkeeper
1	Arnav Anand Kumar ^{U17}	(India) (Singapore)	24 February 2010 (age 16)	(Singapore) Lion City Sailors U15	2023	2025
	Dhruv Bafna ^{U17}	(India)	January 2009	(Singapore) Lion City Sailors U15	2022	2023
Defenders
2	Dante James Pinto ^{U17}	(Singapore)	20 January 2010 (age 16)	(Singapore) Lion City Sailors U15	2023	2025
3	Mohd Haqeem ^{U17}	(Singapore)		(Singapore) Lion City Sailors U15	2024	2025
4	Shlok Ranadive ^{U17}	(Singapore)	10 June 2010 (age 16)	(Singapore)	2025	2025
5	Issac Matthew Saw Tian Zhi ^{U17}	(Singapore) (Malaysia)	2009	(Singapore) Lion City Sailors U15	2023	2025
16	Diego Woodford Bennett ^{U17}	(Singapore) (England)		(Singapore) Lion City Sailors U15	2023	2025
20	Isyraf Khan Fhirhad ^{U17}	(Singapore)		(Singapore) Lion City Sailors U15	2024	2025
7	Caden Pereira ^{AFA DC U17}	(Singapore)	3 February 2010 (age 16)	(Singapore) Lion City Sailors U15	2022	2025
20	Joshua Chong Rong Kai ^{AFA DC U17}	(Singapore)	17 September 2009 (age 17)	(Singapore) Lion City Sailors U15	2022	2025
22	Dylan Ng Jing Hang ^{AFA DC U17}	(Singapore)	17 September 2009 (age 17)	(Singapore) Lion City Sailors U15	2023	2025
23	Bavesh Kumar ^{AFA DC U17}	(Singapore)		(Singapore) Sailors Development U15	2022	2025
23	Lalith Kumar Theeraj Kumar ^{AFA DC U17}	(Singapore)		(Singapore) Sailors Development U15	2024	2025
23	Norafiq Eindra ^{AFA DC U17}	(Singapore)		(Singapore) Sailors Development U15	2024	2025
28	Tyler Tan ^{U17}	(Singapore)	7 July 2010 (age 16)	(Singapore) Lion City Sailors U15	2023	2025
30	Yeo Boon Chin ^{AFA DC U17}	(Singapore)		(Singapore) Sailors Development U15	2024	2025
37	Danial Fadli ^{AFA DC U17}	(Singapore)		(Singapore) Lion City Sailors U15	2024	2025
38	Asya'ari Azhar ^{AFA DC U17}	(Singapore)		(Singapore) Lion City Sailors U15	2024	2025
48	Rayyan Roslan ^{AFA DC U17}	(Singapore)		(Singapore) Lion City Sailors U15	2024	2025
60	Leow Yi Leh ^{AFA DC U17}	(Singapore)		(Singapore)	2024	2025
71	Lukesh Warrier ^{AFA DC U17}	(Singapore)		(Singapore)	2024	2025
78	Ajai kadhir Maran ^{AFA DC U17}	(Singapore)		(Singapore)	2024	2025
	Haziq Yazid ^{AFA DC U17}	(Singapore)		Singapore Sports School	2024	2024
	Caleb Leo Chin Hee ^{U17}	(Singapore)	28 March 2010 (age 16)	(Singapore) Lion City Sailors U15	2022	2025
Midfielders
6	Aiden Yang Zhekai ^{U17}	(Singapore)	13 February 2011 (age 15)	(Singapore) Lion City Sailors U15	2024	2025
7	Tan Yu Bin ^{U17}	(Singapore)		(Singapore) Lion City Sailors U15	2024	2025
8	Iman Naqib Idris ^{U17}	(Singapore)		(Singapore) Lion City Sailors U15	2024	2025
12	Aydin Adfan ^{U17}	(India)		(Singapore) Lion City Sailors U15	2022	2025
13	Safyn Ali Sahar ^{U17}	(Singapore)		(Singapore) Lion City Sailors U15	2022	2025
14	Aykel Akasyah ^{U17}	(Singapore)		(Singapore) Lion City Sailors U15	2024	2025
21	Marcellus Kee Tng Chun ^{U17}	(Singapore)		(Singapore) Lion City Sailors U15	2024	2025
4	Tan Kayne Jin ^{AFA DC U17}	(Singapore)		(Singapore) Lion City Sailors U15	2023	2025
10	Devan Kumar ^{AFA DC U17}	(Singapore)		(Singapore) Sailors Development U15	2023	2025
11	Rohit Abraham ^{AFA DC U17}	(Singapore)		(Singapore) Sailors Development U15	2023	2025
11	Lim Kai Sheun ^{AFA DC U17}	(Singapore)	2009	(Singapore) ActiveSG	2025	2025
11	John Gipson Adriel ^{AFA DC U17}	(Singapore)		(Singapore) Sailors Development U15	2024	2025
12	Caden Tan Li Chin ^{AFA DC U17}	(Singapore)		(Singapore) Sailors Development U15	2024	2025
35	Issac Ng Wei Wen ^{AFA DC U17}	(Singapore)		(Singapore) Sailors Development U15	2022	2025
36	Jevarn Ong ^{AFA DC U17}	(Singapore)		(Singapore) Sailors Development U15	2024	2025
82	Aqil Zulkarnain Supandy ^{AFA DC U17}	(Singapore)		(Singapore)	2023	2025
83	Ng Jun Yu Owen ^{AFA DC U17}	(Singapore)		(Singapore)	2025	2025
	Danish Irfan Hazin ^{AFA DC U17}	(Singapore)		(Singapore)	2025	2025
	Iliya Asano ^{U17}	(Singapore) (Belarus)	7 November 2010 (age 16)	(Singapore) Lion City Sailors U15	2022	2025
	Thomas Cunning ^{U17}	(Singapore)	3 June 2008 (age 18)	(Singapore) Turf City FC	2022	2022
Strikers
9	Adryan Alfian ^{U17}	(Singapore)		(Singapore) Lion City Sailors U15	2023	2025
11	Aufa Basyar ^{U17}	(Singapore)		(Singapore) Lion City Sailors U15	2023	2025
18	Fikri Aqil Shalihan ^{U17}	(Singapore)		(Singapore) Lion City Sailors U15	2023	2025
22	Tan Zheng Rui ^{U17}	(Singapore)		(Singapore) Lion City Sailors U15	2023	2025
62	Thabo Jan Fredrick Gorgen ^{U17}	(Germany)		(Singapore) Lion City Sailors U14	2024	Dec 2026
6	Ryan Seak Zheng Wei ^{AFA DC U17}	(Singapore)		(Singapore) Sailors Development U15	2024	2025
14	Adryan Shah ^{AFA DC U17}	(Singapore)		(Singapore) Sailors Development U15	2024	2025
15	Raul Eligio ^{AFA DC U17}	(Mexico)		(Singapore) Sailors Development U15	2024	2025
16	Danish Anaqi ^{AFA DC U17}	(Singapore)		(Singapore) Sailors Development U15	2023	2025
19	Varghese Ethan Joseph ^{AFA DC U17}	(Singapore) (India)		(Singapore) Lion City Sailors U15	2024	2025
34	Leandro Naim Santos ^{AFA DC U7}	(Brazil)		(Singapore) Sailors Development U15	2023	2025
Players who left mid season
8	Xavier Tan Shan Yang ^{AFA DC U17}	(Singapore)		(Singapore) Sailors Development U15	2023	2025
9	Jadon Quah Song Yee ^{AFA DC U17}	(Singapore)	20 April 2008 (age 18)	(Singapore) Active Football SG	2023	2025
27	Jacas Tjhai Jun Heo	(Singapore)	5 January 2010 (age 16)	(Singapore) Lion City Sailors U15	2025	2026
31	Naqeeb Shawaluddin	(Singapore)	23 August 2010 (age 16)	(Singapore) Lion City Sailors U15	2025	2026
71	Luthfi Sufaiqish (G) ^{AFA DC U17}	(Singapore)	2009	(Singapore) Lion City Sailors U17	2025	2025
2	Karlheinz Oma Koppe ^{AFA DC U17}	(Germany)		(Singapore) Sailors Development U15	2024	2025
3	Caleb Tan Kai Zhe (D) ^{AFA DC U17}	(Singapore)		(Singapore) Sailors Development U15	2022	2026
72	Ziqry Eizyanshah Azam (D) ^{AFA DC U17}	(Singapore)		(Singapore)	2024	2026
	Bryan Khng En (M) ^{AFA DC U17}	(Singapore)		(Singapore) Sailors Development U15	2023	2025

=== U16/15 squad ===
Squad No.	Name	Nationality	Date of Birth (Age)	Previous Club	Contract Since	Contract End
Goalkeepers
	Shahrul Ashari ^{U15}	(Singapore)	2010		2023	2023
Defenders
2	Tristan Lloyd Thomas ^{AFA DC U15}	(England)		(Singapore)	2025	2025
4	Isaias Long ^{AFA DC U15}	(Singapore)		(Singapore)	2025	2025
12	Evan Liu Chengru ^{AFA DC U15}	(Singapore)		(Singapore)	2025	2025
14	Syafiqry Rizqy Rafi ^{AFA DC U15}	(Singapore)		(Singapore)	2025	2025
14	Ryan Ameer ^{AFA DC U15}	(Singapore)		(Singapore)	2025	2025
19	Aaryan Om Gokaldas ^{AFA DC U15}	(Singapore)		(Singapore)	2025	2025
20	Noah Markus Kraft ^{AFA DC U15}	(Sweden)		(Singapore)	2025	2025
21	Nail Taib ^{AFA DC U15}	(Singapore)		(Singapore)	2025	2025
28	Ciaran Wen Ye Chew ^{U15}	(Singapore)		(Singapore) Lion City Sailors U13	2023	2023
30	Kellan Woolfe ^{U15}	(United States) (Singapore)	2009	(Singapore) Lion City Sailors U13	2022	2023
31	Matthew Wee ^{U15}	(Singapore)	2009	(Singapore) Lion City Sailors U13	2022	2023
38	Kai Kaidan Farrell ^{U15}	(Singapore)		(Singapore) Lion City Sailors U13	2023	2023
59	Shahbil Fitri ^{U15}	(Singapore)		(Singapore)	2023	2023
63	Ong Ding Hao ^{U15}	(Singapore)		(Singapore)	2023	2023
77	Jevam Ong ^{U15}	(Singapore)		(Singapore)	2023	2023
	Bryan Chua Tian Ci ^{U15}	(Singapore)	17 September 2009 (age 17)	(Singapore) Lion City Sailors U13	2022	2023
	Riz Ilhan Ashriq ^{AFA DC U15}	(Singapore)		(Singapore)	2023	2024
Midfielders
29	Lee Seul Hong ^{AFA DC U15}	(South Korea)		(Singapore) Sailors Development U14	2024	2025
31	Ethan Chan Wing Fung ^{AFA DC U15}	(Singapore)		(Singapore)	2024	2025
33	Emraan Ezaad ^{AFA DC U15}	(Singapore)		(Singapore)	2024	2025
34	Hady Masjuri ^{AFA DC U15}	(Singapore)		(Singapore)	2024	2025
36	Mirza Nathirsha Shafir ^{AFA DC U15}	(Singapore)		(Singapore)	2024	2025
37	Kyle Wong Joon Hei ^{AFA DC U15}	(Singapore)		(Singapore)	2024	2025
38	Ben Weingarten ^{AFA DC U15}	(Netherlands)		(Singapore)	2024	2025
49	S Santosh ^{AFA DC U15}	(Singapore)		(Singapore)	2024	2025
51	Colin Chew Wen Yu ^{AFA DC U15}	(Singapore)		(Singapore)	2024	2025
51	Raihan Rashid ^{AFA DC U15}	(Singapore)		(Singapore)	2024	2025
52	Reinhart Oma Koppe ^{AFA DC U15}	(Germany)		(Singapore) Sailors Development U13	2024	2025
53	Tobias Fang Yile ^{AFA DC U15}	(Singapore)		(Singapore)	2024	2025
54	Aaron Ariq Herman ^{AFA DC U15}	(Singapore)		(Singapore)	2024	2025
57	Vijayakumar Nidish ^{AFA DC U15}	(Singapore)		(Singapore)	2024	2025
22	Yang Seojun ^{U15}	(South Korea)		(Singapore)	2025	2025
52	Adryan Putera ^{U15}	(Singapore)		(Singapore)	2023	2024
42	Kadhir Maran Ajai ^{AFA DC U16}	(Singapore)			2024	2024
42	Foo Yong Ze ^{U15}	(Singapore)		(Singapore)	2023	2023
58	Owl Zhe Han Jairus ^{AFA DC U16}	(Singapore)		(Singapore)	2024	2024
66	Danish Haikal ^{U15}	(Singapore)		(Singapore)	2023	2023
81	Connor John Forsyth ^{AFA DC U16}	(Argentina)			2023	2023
Strikers
7	Benicio Khoo Yong Wu ^{AFA DC U15}	(Singapore)	6 August 2010 (age 16)	(Singapore) Sailors Development U13	2023	2025
9	Yu Kichiji ^{AFA DC U15}	(Japan)	6 August 2010 (age 16)	(Singapore) Sailors Development U13	2023	2025
11	Hugo Kai Rawlings ^{AFA DC U15}	(England)		(Singapore)	2025	2025
27	Khilfy Zulfael ^{AFA DC U15}	(Singapore)		(Singapore) Lion City Sailors U13	2022	2025
58	Lucas Tok Yan Kit ^{AFA DC U15}	(Singapore)		(Singapore) Lion City Sailors U13	2023	2025
59	Creak Jem Louis Mclaren ^{AFA DC U15}	(Singapore)		(Singapore)	2023	2025
60	Haikel Noreffendy ^{AFA DC U15}	(Singapore)		(Singapore)	2023	2025
63	Hugo Joanny ^{AFA DC U15}	(Singapore)		(Singapore)	2023	2025
64	Ammar Farouk ^{AFA DC U15}	(Singapore)		(Singapore)	2023	2025
74	Hayden Toh Ying Le ^{AFA DC U15}	(Singapore)		(Singapore)	2023	2025
82	Hadif Anaqi ^{AFA DC U15}	(Singapore)		(Singapore)	2023	2025
87	Lucas Jerome Augustin ^{AFA DC U15}	(Singapore)		(Singapore)	2023	2025
95	Thierry Amyza ^{AFA DC U15}	(Singapore)		(Singapore)	2023	2025
32	Nguyen Yaqine Nathan Sen ^{AFA DC U16}	(Singapore) (Vietnam)			2024	2024
	Reyes Chang Yu Fung ^{U15}	(Singapore)	15 January 2010 (age 16)	(Singapore)	2023	2023
Players who left the team
32	Erfan Nurhan Fazly ^{AFA DC U16}	(Singapore)		(Japan) Albirex Niigata (S) U15	2024	2024
47	Miro Valio Jai ^{AFA DC U15}	(Canada)		(Singapore)	2024	2025

=== U14/13 squad ===
Squad No.	Name	Nationality	Date of Birth (Age)	Previous Club	Contract Since	Contract End
Goalkeepers
52	Wafi Khaliesh Amri ^{U14}	(Singapore)		(Singapore) Lion City Sailors U12	2024	2025
Defenders
30	Tega Emuejeraye ^{U14}	(Singapore) (Nigeria)		(Singapore) Lion City Sailors U13	2024	2025
52	Nico Verlaine Waddington ^{U14}	(Singapore)		(Singapore) Lion City Sailors U13	2024	2025
57	Aariq Arif ^{U14}	(Singapore)		(Singapore) Lion City Sailors U13	2024	2025
58	Ilhan Nawfal Nazeer ^{U14}	(Singapore)		(Singapore) Lion City Sailors U13	2024	2025
59	Fariel Nabil Fadzeel ^{U14}	(Singapore)		(Singapore) Sailors Development U12	2024	2025
96	Xavier Pua ^{AFA DC U14}	(Singapore)		(Singapore) Sailors Development U13	2025	2025
97	Victor Hsu ^{AFA DC U14}	(Singapore)		(Singapore) Sailors Development U13	2025	2025
	Aaron Ikechukwu Emuejeraye ^{U14}	(Singapore) (Nigeria)		(Singapore) Lion City Sailors U13	2024	2024
	Saif Aqasha Faizal ^{U14}	(Singapore)		(Singapore)	2024	2024
	Malikh Khairil ^{U13}	(Singapore)		(Singapore)	2023	2023
Midfielders
26	Bryceton Pang ^{U14}	(Singapore)		(Singapore) Lion City Sailors U13	2024	2025
29	Suren Roshan Mohan ^{U14}	(Singapore)		(Singapore) Lion City Sailors U13	2024	2025
33	Joshua Ng ^{U14}	(Singapore)		(Singapore) Lion City Sailors U13	2023	2025
34	Alexandre Paoli ^{U14}	(Italy)		(Singapore) Lion City Sailors U13	2023	2025
76	Ayden Anarqy Kamarulzaman ^{AFA DC U14}	(Singapore)		(Singapore) Sailors Development U13	2025	2025
77	Zenius Kong Zhun Ming ^{AFA DC U14}	(Singapore)		(Singapore)	2025	2025
78	Izz Qaiser Colorado ^{AFA DC U14}	(Singapore)		(Singapore)	2025	2025
82	Tengku Haziq Rizqin ^{AFA DC U14}	(Singapore)		(Singapore) Sailors Development U13	2025	2025
86	Raoul Lee-Harsha ^{AFA DC U14}	(Singapore)		(Singapore) Sailors Development U13	2025	2025
89	Daryl Seak Yi Wei ^{AFA DC U14}	(Singapore)		(Singapore) Sailors Development U13	2025	2025
90	Nithipat Puranamaneewiwat ^{AFA DC U14}	(Thailand)		(Singapore) Sailors Development U13	2025	2025
93	Sho Tsukamoto ^{AFA DC U14}	(Japan)		(Singapore) Sailors Development U13	2025	2025
94	Micah Erfan Samimi ^{AFA DC U14}	(Singapore)		(Singapore) Sailors Development U13	2025	2025
	Haziq Danial ^{U14}	(Singapore)		(Singapore)	2023	2024
	Chae Tjer ^{AFA DC}	(Singapore)			2023	2023
	Park Suh-ho ^{AFA DC U13}	(South Korea)		(Singapore)	2025	2025
	Tan Shaun Jin ^{AFA DC U13}	(Singapore)		(Singapore)	2025	2025
Strikers
32	Andrew Tham Sheng Yong ^{U14}	(Singapore)		(Singapore) Lion City Sailors U13	2023	2025
36	Airell Aidil ^{U14}	(Singapore)		(Singapore) Sailors Development U13	2025	2025
38	Koki Yanamoto ^{U14}	(Japan)		(Singapore) Sailors Development U13	2025	2025
40	Tengku Rayyan Rizqin ^{U14}	(Singapore)		(Singapore) Sailors Development U13	2025	2025
42	Hazeeq Hazmi ^{U14}	(Singapore)		(Singapore) Sailors Development U13	2025	2025
43	Tyler Koh Zi Jie ^{U14}	(Singapore)		(Singapore) Sailors Development U13	2025	2025
44	Zach Danish ^{U14}	(Singapore)		(Singapore) Sailors Development U13	2025	2025
45	Ilhan Darwish Bahrurrazi ^{U14}	(Singapore)		(Singapore) Sailors Development U13	2025	2025
46	Hugo Bouvard ^{U14}	(Singapore)		(Singapore) Sailors Development U13	2025	2025
50	Raphael Courant ^{U14}	(France)		(Singapore) Sailors Development U13	2025	2025
51	Ciao Xandro Pancho Catubag ^{U13}	(Singapore)		(Singapore) Sailors Development U13	2025	2025
79	Eir'man Aqel Juraimi ^{AFA DC U14}	(Singapore)		(Singapore) Sailors Development U13	2025	2025
80	Low Kai Hean ^{AFA DC U14}	(Singapore)		(Singapore) Sailors Development U13	2025	2025
81	Luis Quintanilla Carrillo ^{AFA DC U14}	(Colombia)		(Singapore) Sailors Development U13	2025	2025
84	Yuki Takahashi ^{AFA DC U14}	(Japan)		(Singapore) Sailors Development U13	2025	2025
85	Alexander Georg Schneeberger ^{AFA DC U14}	(Germany)		(Singapore) Sailors Development U13	2025	2025
87	Chew Shin Kai ^{AFA DC U14}	(Germany)		(Singapore) Sailors Development U13	2025	2025
88	Mika Asidq Fariheen ^{AFA DC U14}	(Singapore)		(Singapore) Sailors Development U13	2025	2025
91	Rifqi Hanif Hidzat ^{AFA DC U14}	(Singapore)		(Singapore) Sailors Development U13	2025	2025
3	Hugo Bouvard ^{U13}	(France)		(Singapore)	2025	2025
9	Royce Luke Kai Yuen ^{AFA DC U13}	(Singapore)		(Singapore) Sailors Development U12	2025	2025
9	Thabo Jan Fredrick Gorgen ^{AFA DC U13}	(Germany)		(Singapore)	2024	2025
11	Ilmal Yaqin Fadzuhasny ^{AFA DC U13}	(Singapore)		(Singapore)	2024	2025
25	Toshiharu Anzai ^{AFA DC U13}	(Japan)		(Singapore) Lion City Sailors U13	2025	2025
35	Hamzah Azri ^{U14}	(Singapore)		(Singapore) Lion City Sailors U13	2023	2025
78	Haruji Umeda ^{AFA DC U13}	(Japan)		(Singapore)	2024	2025
19	Malikh Khairil ^{AFA DC U13}	(Singapore)		(Singapore)	2024	2024
94	Muhammad Afiq Danial ^{AFA DC U13}	(Singapore)		(Singapore) Geylang International U13	2024	2024
10	Adib Arfah ^{AFA DC U14}	(Singapore)		(Singapore) Sailors Development Centre	2023	2024
47	Ahyan Abdul Rahim ^{U14}	(Singapore)		(Singapore) Sailors Development U13	2025	2025
48	Aniq Aqish Alfee ^{U14}	(Singapore)		(Singapore) Sailors Development U13	2025	2025
46	Ironn Goh Ming Kai ^{U14}	(Singapore)		(Singapore) Sailors Development U13	2025	2025

=== U12 squad ===
Squad No.	Name	Nationality	Date of Birth (Age)	Previous Club	Contract Since	Contract End
Goalkeepers
Defenders
2	Eryandez Khairil ^{U12}	(Singapore)		(Singapore)	2025	2025
3	Tengku A'dhyean Rehan ^{U12}	(Singapore)		(Singapore)	2025	2025
4	Riyadh Alfayyadh ^{U12}	(Singapore)		(Singapore)	2025	2025
5	Jakob Sandgren ^{U12}	(Singapore)		(Singapore)	2025	2025
6	Kyle Kennedy ^{U12}	(Singapore)		(Singapore)	2025	2025
20	Seth Lee Ka Weng ^{U12}	(Singapore)		(Singapore)	2025	2025
21	Daito Ono ^{U12}	(Japan)		(Singapore)	2025	2025
23	Julian Scully ^{U12}	(Singapore)		(Singapore)	2025	2025
25	Arjun Hooda ^{U12}	(Singapore)		(Singapore)	2025	2025
26	Muh Erza Mykhayl ^{U12}	(Singapore)		(Singapore)	2025	2025
27	Muh Jazuli Jailani ^{U12}	(Singapore)		(Singapore)	2025	2025
4	Farish Nabil Fadzeel ^{AFA DC U12}	(Singapore)		(Singapore)	2025	2025
5	Aufa Assyauqie Shalihan ^{AFA DC U12}	(Singapore)		(Singapore)	2025	2025
12	James Chen Boxuan ^{AFA DC U12}	(Singapore)		(Singapore)	2025	2025
14	Carmelina Elizabeth Peck ^{AFA DC U12}	(Singapore)		(Singapore)	2025	2025
15	Lucas Guang Loong Chin ^{AFA DC U12}	(Singapore)		(Singapore)	2025	2025
24	Farie Rafael ^{AFA DC U12}	(Singapore)		(Singapore)	2025	2025
34	Anand Yoji Das ^{AFA DC U12}	(Singapore)		(Singapore)	2025	2025
Midfielders
7	Maximus Pattarapost Philippi ^{U12}	(France) (Thailand)		(Singapore)	2025	2025
8	Emile Sihan Cadoux ^{U12}	(France)		(Singapore)	2025	2025
28	Shaqeel Khan ^{U12}	(Singapore)		(Singapore)	2025	2025
29	Christian Kimi Raudzsus ^{U12}	(Germany)		(Singapore)	2024	2025
30	Dzimar Jazil Hydir ^{U12}	(Singapore)		(Singapore)	2025	2025
31	Dameer Harith Jefrey ^{U12}	(Singapore)		(Singapore)	2025	2025
32	Noah Isaac Augustin ^{U12}	(Singapore)		(Singapore)	2025	2025
63	Adrian Adam Hadi ^{U12}	(Singapore)		(Singapore)	2025	2025
89	Saffi Gavrie Sofiyan ^{U12}	(Singapore)		(Singapore)	2025	2025
8	Adam Armaan Rahim ^{AFA DC U12}	(Singapore)		(Singapore)	2025	2025
10	Mikito Takamatsu ^{AFA DC U12}	(Japan)		(Singapore)	2025	2025
44	Ibraheem Badrul Hisham ^{AFA DC U12}	(Singapore)		(Singapore)	2025	2025
	Lucas Chin ^{U12}	(Singapore)		(Singapore)	2024	2024
Forwards
9	Nur Hana Raiqa ^{U12}	(Singapore)		(Singapore)	2025	2025
12	Thomas Walker ^{U12}	(Singapore)		(Singapore)	2025	2025
17	Heng Yichuan Nathan ^{U12}	(Singapore)		(Singapore)	2025	2025
18	Aariz Ilhan ^{U12}	(Singapore)		(Singapore)	2025	2025
19	Chua Meng Han Gideon ^{U12}	(Singapore)		(Singapore)	2025	2025
7	Max James Robinson ^{AFA DC U12}	(Australia)		(Australia)	2025	2025
9	Takafumi Mori ^{AFA DC U12}	(Japan)		(Singapore)	2025	2025
11	Ang Yong Xiang ^{AFA DC U12}	(Singapore)		(Singapore)	2025	2025
	Ilhan Nawfal Nazeer ^{AFA DC U12}	(Singapore)		(Singapore)	2024	2025
	Ilman Hafidz Yazid ^{AFA DC U12}	(Singapore)		(Singapore)	2025	2025
	Dan Fishman ^{AFA DC U12}	(Germany)		(Singapore)	2024	2024

== Kits ==
Kits using Adidas's trademark
Home	Away	Goalkeeper Home ^{1}	Goalkeeper Away ^{2}

== Staff ==
The following list displays the coaching and administrative staff of Lion City Sailors FC:

Management Team

Position	Name
Chairman	(Singapore) Forrest Li
CEO	(Singapore) Bruce Liang
Sporting Director	(Serbia) Luka Lalić
Technical Director	(Serbia) Luka Lalić
General Manager	(Singapore) Tan Li Yu
Head of Recruitment	(Croatia) Igor Cerina

First Team

Position	Name
Team Manager (SPL)	(Vietnam) Hương Trần
Team Manager (WPL)	(Singapore) Jenny Tan
Head Women Program	(Singapore) Yeong Sheau Shyan (Note: Appointed as coach of U16 Girls National Team for Lion City Cup)
Head Coach	(Serbia) Aleksandar Ranković (till 6 Feb) (Spain) Jesús Casas
Head Coach (Women)	(Singapore) Daniel Ong
Assistant Coach	(Serbia) Marko Perović (till 6 Feb) (Serbia) Danilo Tesic (till 23 Feb) (Spain) Alejandro Varela (Spain) Salva Romero
Assistant Coach (Women)	(Singapore) Izz Haziq Izan
Goalkeeping Coach	(Serbia) Srdjan Maksimovic (till 6 Feb) (Spain) David Valle
Goalkeeping Coach (Women)	(Singapore) Joey Sim
Fitness Coach	(Spain) Manuel Salado
Head Strength & Conditioning (S&C) Coach	(Portugal) Miguel Bragança
Rehabilitation Coach	(Netherlands) Niels Van Sundert
Performance Coach	(Singapore) He Qi Xiang
Sports Scientist	(Netherlands) Mike Kerklaan (Portugal) André Gonçalves Mendes
Video Analyst	(Spain) Varo Moreno
Match Analyst	(Singapore) Daniel Lau
Head of Logistics	(Singapore) Zahir Taufeek
Sports Cordinator	(Singapore) Masrezal Bin Mashuri

U21 Team

Head Coach (Under-21)	(Singapore) Jasni Hatta
Asst Coach (Under-21)	
Goalkeeping Coach (Under-21)	(Singapore) Chua Lye Heng
Performance Coach (Under-21)	
Individual Coach (Under-21)	
Sports Scientist (Under-21)	
Match Analyst (Under-21)	
Video Analyst (Under-21)	

Academy

Position	Name
Head of Academy	(Portugal) Nuno Pereira
Head of DC Team	
Under-17 Head Coach & Academy Coordinator	(Portugal) Bruno Jeremias (Singapore) Ashraf Ariffin (Note: Appointed as coach of U16 Boys National Team for Lion City Cup)
Under-15 Head Coach	(Netherlands) Wiebe de Haan
Under-14 Head Coach	(Singapore) Khairil Asyraf
Under-13 Head Coach	(Singapore) Hamqaamal Shah
Under-12 Head Coach	(Portugal) Francisco Couto
Under-11 Head Coach	(Singapore) Kevin Tan
Under-10 Head Coach	
Head of Youth Goalkeeper Coach	(Singapore) Shahril Jantan
Goalkeeping Coach (U17)	(Singapore) Yeo Jun Guang
Goalkeeping Coach (U15)	
Goalkeeping Coach (U13)	(Singapore) Fadly Tamiri
Performance Coach (U17)	
Performance Coach (U15)	
Performance Coach (U13)	
Individual Coach (U17) & Talent Coordinator	(Portugal) Gonçalo Barbosa
Individual Coach (U15)	(Portugal) Diogo Lopes
Individual Coach (U13)	(Portugal) Rui Duro
S&C Coach (U17)	(Singapore) Gabriel Low
S&C Coach (U15)	
S&C Coach (U13)	(Singapore) Leslie Chen
Medical Coordinator	(Estonia) Tarmo Tikk
Sports Trainer	(Singapore) Amanda Cheong
Video Analyst (Development)	(Singapore) Raihan Ismail
Video Analyst (U17)	(Singapore) Zachary Wu
Match Analyst (U17)	(Singapore) Gautam Selvamany
Rehabilitation Coach (U17)	(Portugal) João Crespo
Video Analyst (U15)	(Singapore) Poh Kai Ern
Nutritionist	(Netherlands) Denise Van Ewijk
Administrative Manager	(Singapore) Clement Choong
Logistics Manager	(Malaysia) Jackson Goh
Multimedia Manager	(Singapore) Adrian Tan
International Relations	(Singapore) Calum Lim
Kitman	(Singapore) Uncle John

== Transfers ==
=== In ===
Pre-season

Date	Position	Player	Transferred from	Ref
First Team
6 July 2025	DF	(Singapore) Safuwan Baharudin	(Malaysia) Selangor	Season loan
8 July 2025	DF	(Portugal) Diogo Costa	(Portugal) F.C. Famalicão (P1)	5 years contract till Jun-2030
10 July 2025	GK	(Croatia) Ivan Susak	(Croatia) Slaven Belupo	Free
16 July 2025	MF	(Cameroon) (Germany) Tsiy-William Ndenge	(Switzerland) Grasshopper	Free
17 July 2025	FW	(Brazil) Anderson Lopes	(Japan) Yokohama F. Marinos	SGD$2m
31 July 2025	DF	(Singapore) Nur Adam Abdullah	(Singapore) Young Lions	End of NS
15 August 2025	MF	(Singapore) Justin Hui	(Singapore) Hougang United	Free
31 August 2025	DF	(Singapore) Akmal Azman	(Singapore) Geylang International	Free
31 August 2025	DF	(Singapore) Faisal Shahril	(Singapore) Geylang International	Free
31 August 2025	DF	(Singapore) Danish Irfan	(Singapore) Hougang United	Free
31 August 2025	MF	(Singapore) Umar Ramle	(Singapore) Tanjong Pagar United	Free
31 August 2025	FW	(Singapore) Naufal Azman	(Singapore) Geylang International	Free
U23
1 June 2025	DF	(Singapore) Marcus Mosses	(Singapore) Tanjong Pagar United	End of loan
1 June 2025	MF	(Singapore) Uvayn Kumar	(Singapore) Tanjong Pagar United	End of loan
1 June 2025	MF	(Singapore) Izrafil Yusof	(Singapore) Tanjong Pagar United	End of loan (Note: Izrafil moves to Young Lions on loan for new season.)
1 June 2025	MF	(Singapore) Yasir Nizamudin	(Singapore) Hougang United U21	End of loan
1 July 2025	FW	(Singapore) (Nigeria) Uchenna Eziakor	(Spain) Rayo Ciudad Alcobendas Academy	End of loan
31 July 2025	MF	(Singapore) Nur Muhammad Asis	(Portugal) C.F. Estrela da Amadora (P1)	End of loan (Note: Asis loan with Estrela’s B Team ended and he moved to FC Vizela U23 on loan.)
31 July 2025	MF	(Singapore) Jonan Tan En Yuan	(Portugal) C.F. Estrela da Amadora (P1)	End of loan (Note: Jonan Tan with Estrela’s B Team ended and he moved to FC Vizela U23 on loan.)
20 August 2025	GK	(Singapore) Efan Qiszman	(Singapore) Balestier Khalsa U21	Free
20 August 2025	GK	(Singapore) Seth Lee	(Singapore) Balestier Khalsa U21	Free
20 August 2025	DF	(Singapore) Aaryan Fikri	(Singapore) Balestier Khalsa U21	Free
20 August 2025	DF	(Singapore) Raiyan Izdihar	(Singapore) Balestier Khalsa U21	Free
20 August 2025	MF	(Singapore) Aiman Zayani	(Singapore) Balestier Khalsa U21	Free
20 August 2025	MF	(Singapore) Bryan Khng	(Singapore) Balestier Khalsa U21	Free
20 August 2025	MF	(Singapore) Adam Faisal	(Singapore) Balestier Khalsa U21	Free
20 August 2025	MF	(Singapore) Jan Tze Soong	(Singapore) Balestier Khalsa U21	Free
20 August 2025	MF	(Singapore) Ahmad Danial	(Singapore) Tanjong Pagar United U21	Free
20 August 2025	FW	(Singapore) (Nepal) Namsang Rai	(Singapore) Hougang United	Free

Mid-season

Date	Position	Player	Transferred from	Ref
First Team
6 January 2026	FW	(Serbia) Luka Adžić	(Thailand) Bangkok United	Free
8 January 2026	FW	(Singapore) (Japan) Kyoga Nakamura	(Thailand) Bangkok United	Free
9 January 2026	GK	(Slovenia) Benjamin Žerak	(Singapore) Young Lions	End of loan
9 January 2026	MF	(Brazil) Lucas Agueiro	(Singapore) Young Lions	End of loan
U23
1 January 2026	DF	(Singapore) Adrian Jaccard	Free Agent	N.A.
1 January 2026	DF	(Singapore) Aniq Raushan	(Singapore) Young Lions	End of loan
1 January 2026	MF	(Singapore) Danie Hafiy	(Singapore) Young Lions	End of loan
1 January 2026	FW	(Singapore) (England) Ilyasin Zayan	(Singapore) Young Lions	End of loan
1 January 2026	MF	(Singapore) (Nepal) Rijan Rai	(Singapore) Balestier Khalsa	Free
11 January 2026	FW	(Singapore) Izrafil Yusof	(Singapore) Young Lions	End of loan
1 May 2026	MF	(Singapore) Nur Muhammad Asis	(Portugal) FC Vizela U23 (P2)	End of loan

Post-season

Date	Position	Player	Transferred from	Ref
First Team
2026	DF	(Lebanon) (Canada) Omar Sabbagh	(Puerto Rico) Ponce FC	Undisclosed

=== Out ===
Preseason

Date	Position	Player	Transferred To	Ref	
First Team
31 May 2025	DF	(Portugal) Diogo Costa	(Portugal) F.C. Famalicão (P1)	End of loan	
31 May 2025	DF	(Syria) Ali Al Rina	(Syria) Al-Ittihad SC Aleppo	End of loan	
8 June 2025	FW	(Singapore) Haiqal Pashia	(Singapore) Hougang United	Free	
8 June 2025	DF	(Spain) Sergio Carmona	(Spain) CF Rayo Majadahonda	Free	
10 June 2025	DF	(Australia) (Bosnia and Herzegovina) Obren Kljajić	(Australia) Wollongong Wolves	Free	
10 June 2025	MF	(Singapore) Anumanthan Kumar	(Thailand) Kanchanaburi Power	Free	
12 June 2025	DF	(Singapore) (Mali) Bill Mamadou	(Thailand) Nakhon Ratchasima	Free	
9 July 2025	GK	(Singapore) Zharfan Rohaizad	(Singapore) Hougang United	Season loan	
U23
30 June 2025	MF	(Singapore) Uvayn Kumar	(Singapore)	Free	
30 June 2025	MF	(Singapore) (England) (Japan) Ewan Seddon	(Singapore)	Free	
30 June 2025	FW	(Singapore) Qaisy Noranzor	(Singapore)	Free	
30 June 2025	DF	(Lithuania) Algirdas Karlonas	(Singapore) Hougang United	Free	
1 July 2025	GK	(Slovenia) Benjamin Žerak	(Singapore) Young Lions	Season loan	
1 July 2025	GK	(Singapore) (Malaysia) Ashman Saravanan	(Singapore) Young Lions	Season loan	
1 July 2025	GK	(Singapore) Ainun Nuha Ilyasir	(Singapore) Young Lions	Season loan	
1 July 2025	DF	(Singapore) Marcus Mosses	(Singapore) Young Lions	Season loan till Dec-25	
1 July 2025	DF	(Singapore) Aniq Raushan	(Singapore) Young Lions	Season loan till Dec-25	
1 July 2025	DF	(Singapore) Iliya Naufal	(Singapore) Young Lions	Season loan	
1 July 2025	DF	(Brazil) Enrico Walmrath Silveira	(Singapore) Young Lions	Season loan	
1 July 2025	MF	(Singapore) Danie Hafiy	(Singapore) Young Lions	Season loan till Dec-25	
1 July 2025	MF	(Singapore) Harith Danish Irwan	(Singapore) Young Lions	Season loan	
1 July 2025	MF	(Singapore) Andy Reefqy	(Singapore) Young Lions	Season loan	
1 July 2025	MF	(Portugal) (France) Tiago Martins	(Singapore) Balestier Khalsa	Season loan	
1 July 2025	FW	(England) Harry Spence	(Singapore) Young Lions	Season loan	
1 July 2025	FW	(Singapore) (England) Ilyasin Zayan	(Singapore) Young Lions	Season loan	
1 July 2025	FW	(Singapore) Izrafil Yusof	(Singapore) Young Lions	Season loan till Dec-25	
1 July 2025	FW	(Singapore) (Nigeria) Uchenna Eziakor	(Singapore) Young Lions	Season loan	
1 July 2025	2 July 2025	MF	(Singapore) Jonan Tan	(Portugal) FC Vizela U23 (P2)	Season loan till May 2026 (Note: Asis will primarily train and play with Estrela’s B Team, while also turning out for the club’s Under-23 side.)
1 August 2025	MF	(Singapore) Nur Muhammad Asis	(Portugal) FC Vizela U23 (P2)	Season loan till May 2026	
13 August 2025	DF	(Singapore) Ilhan Rizqullah	(Singapore) Young Lions	Season loan	
13 August 2025	MF	(Singapore) Sarrvin Raj	(Singapore) Young Lions	Season loan	

Mid season

Date	Position	Player	Transferred To	Ref
First Team
8 December 2025	DF	(Singapore) Safuwan Baharudin	(Malaysia) Selangor	Early Termination of loan
31 December 2025	FW	(Belgium) Maxime Lestienne	Retired	End of Contract
5 January 2026	DF	(Singapore) Zulqarnaen Suzliman	(Japan) Albirex Niigata (S)	Season loan
7 January 2026	GK	(Singapore) Izwan Mahbud	(Singapore) Young Lions	Season loan
15 January 2026	FW	(Singapore) (Nigeria) Abdul Rasaq	(Japan) Albirex Niigata (S)	Season loan
SPL2, U23 & Academy
31 December 2025	MF	(Singapore) Jan Tze Soong	(Singapore) SAFSA	Free. Enlisted
31 December 2025	DF	(Singapore) Faisal Shahril	(Singapore) Geylang International	Free
31 December 2025	MF	(Singapore) Umar Ramle	Retired	N.A.
31 December 2025	MF	(Singapore) Justin Hui	Retired	N.A.
1 January 2026	DF	(Singapore) Aniq Raushan	(Singapore) Balestier Khalsa	Season loan
1 January 2026	FW	(Singapore) (England) Ilyasin Zayan	(Singapore) Balestier Khalsa	Season loan
10 January 2026	FW	(Singapore) Izrafil Yusof	(Singapore) Tanjong Pagar United	Season loan
31 January 2026	MF	(Republic of Ireland) (Japan) Joshua Little	(Singapore) Young Lions	Season loan

=== NS ===
Preseason

Position	Player	Transferred to	Team	Ref
FW	(Singapore) (England) Ilyasin Zayan	(Singapore) SAFSA	U21	On national service until December 2025
DF	(Singapore) Aniq Tiryaq	(Singapore) SAFSA	U21	On national service until April 2026
MF	(Singapore) Yazid Rais	(Singapore) SAFSA	U21	On national service until April 2026
FW	(Singapore) Qaisy Noranzor	(Singapore) SAFSA	U21	On national service until April 2026
GK	(Singapore) Issac Goh Jun Yang	(Singapore) SAFSA	U21	On national service until May 2026
DF	(Singapore) Kieran Aryan Azhari	(Singapore) SAFSA	U21	On national service until May 2026
DF	(Singapore) Aqil Khusni	(Singapore) SAFSA	U21	On national service until July 2026
FW	(Singapore) (Iran) (England) Kian Ghadessy	(Singapore) SAFSA	U21	On national service until October 2026
FW	(Singapore) (Germany) Fernandez Casey Klein	(Singapore) SAFSA	U21	On national service until October 2026
MF	(Singapore) Nathan Mao	(Singapore) SAFSA	U21	On national service until March 2027
DF	(Singapore) Muhammad Fadly	(Singapore) SAFSA	U21	On national service until April 2027
DF	(Singapore) Idzham Eszuan	(Singapore) SAFSA	U21	On national service until April 2027
DF	(Singapore) Harith Luth Harith	(Singapore) SAFSA	U21	On national service until April 2027
FW	(Singapore) Ahmad Luthfi Rusfatzilella	(Singapore) SAFSA	U21	On national service until May 2027
FW	(Singapore) (Nigeria) Uchenna Eziakor	(Singapore) SAFSA	U21	On national service until October 2027
DF	(Singapore) Luth Harith	(Singapore) SAFSA	U21	On national service until July 2028
MF	(Singapore) Andy Reefdy	(Singapore) SAFSA	U21	On national service until July 2028
MF	(Singapore) Harith Danish Irwan	(Singapore) SAFSA	U21	On national service until April 2028

== Friendly ==
=== Pre-season ===
Win Draw Loss

Thailand Tour (21 July - 1 August)

26 July 2025 1	Ratchaburi (Thailand)	cancelled	(Singapore) Lion City Sailors	Ratchaburi
				Stadium: Ratchaburi Stadium

31 July 2025 2	Kitchee SC (Hong Kong)	–	(Singapore) Lion City Sailors	(Note: Match will be played behind closed door.)

=== Mid-season ===
Win Draw Loss

14 November 2025 3	Lion City Sailors	–	(Vietnam) Cong An Hanoi FC	Bishan
				Stadium: Bishan Stadium

5 January 2026 4	Lion City Sailors	–	(Vietnam) Ninh Binh FC	Jalan Besar
				Stadium: Jalan Besar Stadium

== Team statistics ==
=== Appearances and goals ===
As of 17 May 2026

No.	Pos.	Player	Singapore Premier League		Singapore Cup		Community Shield		AFC Champions League Two		ASEAN Club Championship		Total	
No.	Pos.	Player	Apps.	Goals	Apps.	Goals	Apps.	Goals	Apps.	Goals	Apps.	Goals	Apps.	Goals
4	DF	(Croatia) Toni Datković	16+3	3	3	0	1	0	6	0	4	0	33	3
5	DF	(Singapore) Lionel Tan	6+4	0	1+2	0	1	0	2+1	0	4+1	0	22	0
6	MF	(Cameroon) (Germany) Tsiy-William Ndenge	16+4	2	2+1	0	0+1	0	6	1	5	0	35	3
7	FW	(Singapore) Shawal Anuar	11+9	7	3	2	0+1	0	1+5	1	4+1	1	35	11
8	MF	(Portugal) Rui Pires	9+6	2	2+1	0	1	0	5	0	2	0	26	2
9	FW	(Germany) Lennart Thy	16+5	15	3	1	0+1	1	3+2	3	3	2	33	22
10	MF	(Netherlands) Bart Ramselaar	18+2	8	1+1	0	1	0	5	0	1	0	29	8
11	DF	(Singapore) Hafiz Nor	2+7	0	0+1	0	0	0	0	0	0+3	0	13	0
12	GK	(Slovenia) Benjamin Žerak	0	0	0	0	0	0	0	0	0	0	0	0
13	GK	(Singapore) Adib Azahari	0	0	0	0	0	0	0	0	0	0	0	0
14	MF	(Singapore) Hariss Harun	7+5	0	0	0	0+1	0	3	0	2	0	18	0
15	MF	(Singapore) (South Korea) Song Ui-young	6+5	2	2	0	1	0	3+3	0	2	0	22	2
16	MF	(Singapore) Hami Syahin	10+8	0	1+2	1	0+1	0	1+2	0	3+1	0	29	1
18	FW	(Brazil) Anderson Lopes	9+9	11	1+2	2	1	0	6	5	5	1	33	19
20	DF	(Singapore) Nur Adam Abdullah	7+6	0	0+1	0	0	0	0	0	0+3	0	17	0
22	DF	(Singapore) Christopher van Huizen	8+4	0	2+1	0	0	0	1+1	0	1+3	0	21	0
25	GK	(Croatia) Ivan Sušak	19	1	1	0	1	0	6	0	4	0	31	1
26	DF	(Australia) Bailey Wright	18+1	5	3	1	0	0	5	0	4	0	31	6
28	FW	(Serbia) Luka Adžić	0+4	0	0+1	0	0	0	0	0	0	0	5	0
29	DF	(Portugal) Diogo Costa	16+2	4	3	0	1	0	6	0	5	0	33	4
30	DF	(Singapore) Akram Azman	13+2	2	0+2	0	1	0	2+2	0	2+2	0	26	2
33	MF	(Brazil) Lucas Agueiro	2+7	0	0	0	0	0	0	0	0	0	9	0
41	MF	(Republic of Ireland) Joshua Little	0	0	0	0	0	0	0	0	0	0	0	0
46	MF	(Singapore) (Japan) Kyoga Nakamura	15+1	0	1	0	0	0	0	0	0	0	17	0
Players who have played this season but had left the club on loan to other club
1	GK	(Singapore) Izwan Mahbud	2	0	2	0	0	0	0	0	1	0	5	0
28	GK	(Singapore) Zharfan Rohaizad	0	0	0	0	0	0	0	0	0	0	0	0
19	DF	(Singapore) Zulqarnaen Suzliman	0+1	0	0	0	0	0	0	0	0	0	1	0
31	FW	(Singapore) (Nigeria) Abdul Rasaq	0+3	1	0+1	0	0	0	0+4	0	0+3	0	11	1
Players who have played this season but had left the club
17	FW	(Belgium) Maxime Lestienne	4	4	2	0	1	0	3+1	0	2	2	13	6
21	DF	(Singapore) Safuwan Baharudin	1+1	0	0	0	1	0	2	0	1	0	6	0

== Competitions ==
=== Community Shield ===
As the defending Singapore Premier League and Singapore Cup champions, Lion City Sailors will face the 2024–25 Singapore Premier League runners-up Tampines Rovers in the Singapore Community Shield.

16 August 2025 Final	Lion City Sailors (Singapore)	1–4	(Singapore) BG Tampines Rovers	Jurong East
	Lennart Thy 87'; Diogo Costa (yellow card) 79'	Report	Trent Buhagiar 2', 42'; Koya Kazama 61'; Hide Higashikawa 90+1'	Stadium: Jurong East Stadium; Referee: Farhan Mohd

=== Singapore Premier League ===
Win Draw Loss

25 August 2025 1	Lion City Sailors (Singapore)	2–1	(Singapore) Hougang United	Tampines
	Maxime Lestienne 10', 47'; Lionel Tan (yellow card) 28'; Song Ui-young (yellow card) 84'	Report	Farhan Zulkifli 29'; Anders Aplin (yellow card) 57'; Jordan Vestering (yellow card) 83'	Stadium: Our Tampines Hub (Note: Location changed due to re-turfing of Bishan Stadium); Referee: Clarence Leow; Man of the Match: (Belgium) Maxime Lestienne

14 September 2025 2	Balestier Khalsa (Singapore)	0–5	(Singapore) Lion City Sailors	Tampines
		Report	Bailey Wright 27'; Bart Ramselaar 72'; Lennart Thy 82'; Abdul Rasaq Akeem 90'; Maxime Lestienne 90+4'; Diogo Costa (yellow card) 64'	Stadium: Our Tampines Hub; Referee: Andrea Verolino; Man of the Match: (Netherlands) Bart Ramselaar

21 September 2025 3	Tanjong Pagar United (Singapore)	0–7	(Singapore) Lion City Sailors	Jurong East
		Report	Lennart Thy 14', 45+7'; Diogo Costa 28'; Rui Pires 45+10'; Song Ui-young 45+14'; Anderson Lopes 84', 90+3'	Stadium: Jurong East Stadium; Referee: Farhan Mohd; Man of the Match: (Germany) Lennart Thy

18 October 2026 4	Lion City Sailors (Singapore)	5–1	(Singapore) Young Lions	Bishan
	Maxime Lestienne 18'; Bailey Wright 34'; Lennart Thy 49'; Bart Ramselaar 79'; Shawal Anuar 81'; Nur Adam (yellow card) 38'	Report	Lucas Agueiro 30'; Andrew Aw (yellow card) 72'	Stadium: Bishan Stadium; Referee: Taufik Thana; Man of the Match: (Germany) Lennart Thy

27 October 2025 5 (Rescheduled)	Lion City Sailors (Singapore)	3–0	(Japan) Albirex Niigata (S)	Bishan
	Lennart Thy 19'; Bart Ramselaar 62'; Akram Azman 73'	Report	Takumi Yokohata (yellow card) 69'	Stadium: Bishan Stadium; Referee: Ahmad A'Qashah; Man of the Match: (Netherlands) Bart Ramselaar

17 May 2026 6 (Rescheduled)	BG Tampines Rovers (Singapore)	3–2	(Singapore) Lion City Sailors	Tampines
	Jacob Mahler 57'; Yuki Kobayashi 75'; Hide Higashikawa 78'; Koya Kazama (yellow card) 80' (yellow-red card) 83'	Report	Song Ui-young 50'; Lennart Thy 59'; Kyoga Nakamura (yellow card) 9'; Bailey Wright (yellow card) 63'; Hami Syahin (yellow card) 90+5'	Stadium: Our Tampines Hub; Referee: Mazlan Pagira; Man of the Match: (Japan) Yuki Kobayashi

18 January 2026 7	Geylang International (Singapore)	0–3	(Singapore) Lion City Sailors	Tampines
	Nikola Ignjatovic (yellow card) 42'	Report	Nazrul Nazari 43' (o.g.); Tsiy-William Ndenge 64'; Shawal Anuar 90+1'; Diogo Costa (yellow card) 5'; Bailey Wright (yellow card) 26'	Stadium: Our Tampines Hub; Referee: Farhan Mohd; Man of the Match: (Singapore) Shawal Anuar

24 January 2026 8	Hougang United (Singapore)	1–5; Awarded (Note: Hougang United v Lion City Sailors, originally won 5–1 by Lion City Sailors, was forfeited and awarded 5–1 to Lion City Sailors by the FAS Disciplinary Committee on 3 Mar 2026, as Hougang United fielded Gloire Amanda, even though he has not completed the required regulatory clearances relating to his work pass status. FAS commented that the scorelines will either remain as recorded or be adjusted to 3–0, whichever reflects the greater margin,)	(Singapore) Lion City Sailors	Bishan
	Settawut Wongsai 11'; Huzaifah Aziz (yellow card) 52'	Report	Shawal Anuar 18'; Ryaan Sanizal 27' (o.g.); Lennart Thy 32'; Bart Ramselaar 65', 72'; Kyoga Nakamura (yellow card) 39'; Akram Azman (yellow card) 43'	Stadium: Bishan Stadium (Note: Location changed due to swopping of stadium with LCS upon completion of returfing of Jalan Besar Stadium); Referee: Syarqawi Buhari; Man of the Match: (Netherlands) Bart Ramselaar

1 February 2026 9	Lion City Sailors (Singapore)	5–1	(Singapore) Balestier Khalsa	Jalan Besar
	Anderson Lopes 22', 32'; Diogo Costa 27'; Shawal Anuar 37'; Bailey Wright 66'; Lucas Agueiro (yellow card) 69'	Report	Lionel Tan 24' (o.g.); Harith Kanadi (yellow card) 28'; Lazar Vujanić (yellow card) 43'; Daniel Goh (yellow card) 48'	Stadium: Jalan Besar Stadium; Referee: Mazlan Pagira; Man of the Match: (Brazil) Anderson Lopes

8 February 2026 10	Young Lions (Singapore)	0–2	(Singapore) Lion City Sailors	Jalan Besar
	Sergio Mendonça (yellow card) 71'	Report	Bailey Wright 14'; Lennart Thy 35'; Akram Azman (yellow card) 75'	Stadium: Jalan Besar Stadium; Referee: Syarqawi Buhari; Man of the Match: (Australia) Bailey Wright

15 February 2026 11	Lion City Sailors (Singapore)	7–0	(Singapore) Tanjong Pagar United	Jalan Besar
	Bart Ramselaar 4', 74'; Anderson Lopes 19'; Kim Li-Kwan 45+4'; Shawal Anuar 50'; Akram Azman 82'; Lennart Thy 83'; Bailey Wright (yellow card) 46'	Report	Shodai Nishikawa (red card) 15'	Stadium: Jalan Besar Stadium; Referee: Ahmad A'Qashah; Man of the Match: (Netherlands) Bart Ramselaar

22 February 2026 12	Lion City Sailors (Singapore)	1–1	(Singapore) BG Tampines Rovers	Jalan Besar
	Lennart Thy 22'; Kyoga Nakamura (yellow card) 37'; Rui Pires (yellow card) 77'; Bart Ramselaar (yellow card) 90+4'	Report	Koya Kazama 44'	Stadium: Jalan Besar Stadium; Referee: Jansen Foo; Man of the Match: (Japan) Koya Kazama

28 February 2026 13	Albirex Niigata (S) (Japan)	3–3	(Singapore) Lion City Sailors	Jurong East
	Ryang Hyon-ju 1'; Hariss Harun 14' (o.g.); Komei Iida 66'; Zulqarnaen Suzliman (yellow card) 53'	Report	Anderson Lopes 39' (pen.); Tsiy-William Ndenge 54'; Ivan Sušak 90+7'; Hariss Harun (yellow card) 27'; Hami Syahin (yellow card) 33'; Diogo Costa (yellow card) 89'	Stadium: Jurong East Stadium; Referee: Syarqawi Buhari; Man of the Match: (North Korea) Ryang Hyon-ju

7 March 2026 14 (Rescheduled)	Lion City Sailors (Singapore)	4–0	(Singapore) Geylang International	Jalan Besar
	Toni Datković 27', 79'; Anderson Lopes 28' (yellow card) 68'; Shawal Anuar 71'	Report	Nikola Ignjatovic (yellow card) 45+2'; Nazrul Nazari (yellow card) 45+10'	Stadium: Jalan Besar Stadium; Referee: Mazlan Pagira; Man of the Match: (Croatia) Toni Datković

15 March 2026 15	Balestier Khalsa (Singapore)	0–3	(Singapore) Lion City Sailors	Bishan
	Harith Kanadi (red card) 85'	Report	Diogo Costa 33'; Lennart Thy 40'; Anderson Lopes 85' (pen.)	Stadium: Bishan Stadium; Referee: Clarence Leow; Man of the Match: (Portugal) Diogo Costa

6 April 2026 16	Tanjong Pagar United (Singapore)	0–4	(Singapore) Lion City Sailors	Jurong East
	Junior Djile (yellow card) 45+2'; Faizal Roslan (red card) 75'	Report	Lennart Thy 32'; Bart Ramselaar 48'; Bailey Wright 64'; Diogo Costa 90+9'	Stadium: Jurong East Stadium; Referee: Oswind Suriya; Man of the Match: (Australia) Bailey Wright

12 April 2026 17	Lion City Sailors (Singapore)	4–1	(Singapore) Hougang United	Jalan Besar
	Lennart Thy 37' (pen.); Shawal Anuar 46'; Toni Datković 60' (yellow card) 19'; Anderson Lopes 90+1'		Huzaifah Aziz 9' (yellow card) 86'; Ridhuan Barudin (yellow card) 36'; Yuma Suwa (yellow card) 75'	Stadium: Jalan Besar Stadium; Referee: Farhan Mohd; Man of the Match: (Cameroon) (Germany) Tsiy-William Ndenge

20 April 2026 18	Lion City Sailors (Singapore)	2–0	(Singapore) Young Lions	Jalan Besar
	Lennart Thy 73'; Anderson Lopes 90+8'; Shawal Anuar (yellow card) 78'; Song Ui-young (yellow card) 86'		Ajay Robson (yellow card) 21' (yellow-red card) 61'; Abner Vinicius (yellow card) 90+5'; Sergio Mendonça (yellow card) 90+9'	Stadium: Jalan Besar Stadium; Referee: Jansen Foo; Man of the Match: (Germany) Lennart Thy

26 April 2026 19	Geylang International (Singapore)	0–3	(Singapore) Lion City Sailors	Tampines
	Shahdan Sulaiman (red card) 66'	Report	Anderson Lopes 36'; Rui Pires 46'; Lennart Thy 67' (pen.); Hami Syahin (yellow card) 90+4'	Stadium: Our Tampines Hub; Referee: Zulfiqar Mustaffa; Man of the Match: (Singapore) Lionel Tan

3 May 2026 20 (Rescheduled)	BG Tampines Rovers (Singapore)	0–0	(Singapore) Lion City Sailors	Tampines
		Report	Christopher van Huizen (yellow card) 37'; Jesús Casas (yellow card) 55'; Rui Pires (yellow card) 61'; Ivan Susak (yellow card) 90+5'	Stadium: Our Tampines Hub; Referee: Ahmad A'Qashah; Man of the Match: (Japan) Seiga Sumi

10 May 2026 21	Lion City Sailors (Singapore)	0–2	(Japan) Albirex Niigata (S)	Jalan Besar
	Nur Adam (yellow card) 85'; Toni Datković (red card) 90+6'		Shingo Nakano 49'; Toni Datković 52' (o.g.)	Stadium: Jalan Besar Stadium; Referee: Mazlan Pariga

Pos	Team	Pld	W	D	L	GF	GA	GD	Pts	Qualification or relegation
1	Lion City Sailors (C)	21	16	3	2	70	14	+56	51	Qualification for Champions League Two group stage (Note: Since the winners of the 2025–26 Singapore Cup, Lion City Sailors, qualified for the Champions League Two by league position, the spot reserved for the Singapore Cup winners will pass to the runners-up of the league.)
2	BG Tampines Rovers	21	15	4	2	58	21	+37	49	Qualification for Champions League Two group stage
3	Albirex Niigata (S)	21	15	2	4	47	19	+28	47	
4	Balestier Khalsa	21	11	2	8	44	46	−2	35	
5	Geylang International	21	7	3	11	29	42	−13	24	
6	Hougang United	21	7	0	14	24	41	−17	21	
7	Young Lions (Note: Young Lions cannot qualify for AFC competitions.)	21	2	3	16	15	58	−43	9	
8	Tanjong Pagar United	21	2	1	18	17	63	−46	7	

Updated to match(es) played on 18 May 2026. Source: Singapore Premier League
Rules for classification: 1) points; 2) goal difference; 3) number of goals scored; 4) number of wins
(C) Champions

=== Singapore Cup ===
==== Semi Final ====
14 December 2025 Semi Final Leg 1	Balestier Khalsa (Singapore)	1–4	(Singapore) Lion City Sailors	Bishan
	Bogdan Mandić 12'		Bailey Wright 26'; Lennart Thy 34'; Shawal Anuar 47'; Anderson Lopes 58'	Stadium: Bishan Stadium; Referee: Andrea Verolino; Man of the Match: (Germany) Lennart Thy

20 December 2025 Semi Final Leg 2	Lion City Sailors (Singapore)	1–0 (5–1 agg.)	(Singapore) Balestier Khalsa	Jalan Besar
	Shawal Anuar 8'; Maxime Lestienne (penalty missed) 72			Stadium: Jalan Besar Stadium; Referee: Muhammad Taqi; Man of the Match: (Singapore) Shawal Anuar

Lion City Sailors won 5–1 on aggregate.

==== Final ====
10 January 2026 Final	Lion City Sailors (Singapore)	3–0; Awarded (Note: The match, originally won by Lion City Sailors 2-0 after extra time, was forfeited by Tampines Rovers and awarded 3–0 to Lion City Sailors, as Tampines fielded more than the allowed number of foreigners) (a.e.t.)	(Singapore) BG Tampines Rovers	Jalan Besar
	Hami Syahin 115'; Anderson Lopes 120+2'; Shawal Anuar (yellow card) 34'			Stadium: Jalan Besar Stadium; Attendance: 3,767; Referee: Adam Kersey (Australia); Man of the Match: Bailey Wright

=== AFC Champions League Two ===
==== Group stage ====
Pos	Team	Pld	W	D	L	GF	GA	GD	Pts	Qualification	PSB	BKU	LCS	SEL
1	(Indonesia) Persib	6	4	1	1	11	6	+5	13	Advance to round of 16	—	1–0	1–1	2–0
2	(Thailand) Bangkok United	6	3	1	2	8	7	+1	10 (Note: Head-to-head points: Bangkok United 6, Lion City Sailors 0.)	Advance to round of 16	0–2	—	1–0	1–1
3	(Singapore) Lion City Sailors	6	3	1	2	10	8	+2	10		3–2	1–2	—	4–2
4	(Malaysia) Selangor	6	0	1	5	7	15	−8	1		2–3	2–4	0–1	—

Source: ACL2
Rules for classification: Tiebreakers
Notes:

18 September 2025 1	Persib (Indonesia)	1–1	(Singapore) Lion City Sailors	Bandung, Indonesia
19:15 UTC+7	Saddil Ramdani 47'; Federico Barba (yellow card) 84'	Report	Lennart Thy 90+2'	Stadium: Gelora Bandung Lautan Api Stadium; Attendance: 13,566; Referee: Hanna Hattab (Syria)

1 October 2025 2	Lion City Sailors (Singapore)	4–2	(Malaysia) Selangor	Bishan, Singapore
18:00 UTC+8	Anderson Lopes 6', 13', 45+3', 54'; Rui Pires (yellow card) 20'; Ivan Sušak (yellow card) 36'; Bailey Wright (yellow card) 81'; Hariss Harun (yellow card) 86'	Report	Chrigor 37' (pen.); Faisal Halim 73'	Stadium: Bishan Stadium; Attendance: 1,745; Referee: Chae Sang-hyeop (South Korea)

23 October 2025 3	Bangkok United (Thailand)	1–0	(Singapore) Lion City Sailors	Pathum Thani, Thailand
19:15 UTC+7	Muhsen Al-Ghassani 63' (pen.); Richairo Zivkovic (penalty missed) 11	Report	Hariss Harun (red card) 62'; Song Ui-young (yellow card) 79'; Bailey Wright (yellow card) 88'	Stadium: True BG Stadium; Attendance: 1,006; Referee: Casey Reibelt (Australia)

6 November 2025 4	Lion City Sailors (Singapore)	1–2	(Thailand) Bangkok United	Bishan, Singapore
18:00 UTC+8	Lennart Thy 90+1'; Bailey Wright (yellow card) 90+5'	Report	Muhsen Al-Ghassani 45+2'; Luka Adžić 82'	Stadium: Bishan Stadium; Attendance: 2,049; Referee: Ahmad Alaeddin (Lebanon)

26 November 2025 5	Lion City Sailors (Singapore)	3–2	(Indonesia) Persib	Bishan, Singapore
20:15 UTC+8	Lennart Thy 9'; Shawal Anuar 62'; Anderson Lopes 71' (yellow card) 82'; Lionel Tan (yellow card) 14'; Rui Pires (yellow card) 20'; Maxime Lestienne (yellow card) 90+6'	Report	Frans Putros 11'; Andrew Jung 56'; Patricio Matricardi (yellow card) 51'	Stadium: Bishan Stadium; Attendance: 2,578; Referee: Ammar Mahfoodh (Bahrain)

10 December 2025 6	Selangor (Malaysia)	0–1	(Singapore) Lion City Sailors	Petaling Jaya, Malaysia
20:15 UTC+8	Harith Haiqal (yellow card) 90+2'	Report	Tsiy-William Ndenge 50'	Stadium: Petaling Jaya Stadium; Attendance: 2,354; Referee: Hiroki Kasahara (Japan)

=== ASEAN Club Championship ===
==== Group stage ====
Pos	Team	Pld	W	D	L	GF	GA	GD	Pts	Qualification	NDI	JDT	PKR	BKU	LCS	SUN
1	(Vietnam) Nam Định	5	4	1	0	13	3	+10	13	Advance to knockout stage	—	1–1	2–1	—	3–0	—
2	(Malaysia) Johor Darul Ta'zim	5	3	2	0	13	4	+9	11	Advance to knockout stage	—	—	—	4–0	3–1	3–0
3	(Cambodia) Preah Khan Reach Svay Rieng	5	2	2	1	9	5	+4	8		—	2–2	—	1–1	—	—
4	(Thailand) Bangkok United	5	1	2	2	6	12	−6	5		1–4	—	—	—	2–2	2–1
5	(Singapore) Lion City Sailors	5	1	1	3	6	12	−6	4		—	—	0–2	—	—	3–2
6	(Myanmar) Shan United	5	0	0	5	3	14	−11	0		0–3	—	0–3	—	—	—

Source: ASEAN United FC
Rules for classification: Tiebreakers

21 August 2025 1	Johor Darul Ta'zim (Malaysia)	3–1	(Singapore) Lion City Sailors	Johor, Malaysia
	João Figueiredo 11' (pen.), 16'; Arif Aiman 90+3'; Afiq Fazail (yellow card) 78'; Bergson (yellow card) 83'	Report	Shawal Anuar 90+5'; Safuwan Baharudin (yellow card) 8'; Rui Pires (yellow card) 45+3'	Stadium: Sultan Ibrahim Stadium; Attendance: 13,143; Referee: Koji Takasaki (Japan)

17 December 2025 2 (Rescheduled)	Lion City Sailors (Singapore)	3–2	(Myanmar) Shan United	Jalan Besar, Singapore
	Lennart Thy 23', 68'; Maxime Lestienne 45+2'	Report	Matheus Souza 28' (pen.); Ryuji Hirota 66'; Thet Wai Moe (yellow card) 90+1'	Stadium: Jalan Besar Stadium; Attendance: 1,543; Referee: Yusuke Ohashi (Japan)

4 December 2025 3	Bangkok United (Thailand)	2–2	(Singapore) Lion City Sailors	Pathum Thani, Thailand
	Jakkaphan Praisuwan 24'; Seia Kunori 76'; Suphan Thongsong (yellow card) 35'; Wanchai Jarunongkran (yellow card) 75'	Report	Maxime Lestienne 11'; Anderson Lopes 20'	Stadium: True BG Stadium; Referee: Meder Tayçiev (Kyrgyzstan)

29 January 2026 4	Nam Định (Vietnam)	3–0	(Singapore) Lion City Sailors	Ninh Bình, Vietnam
	Caio César 35'; Nguyễn Xuân Son 61', 90+2'; Trần Văn Kiên (yellow card) 20'	Report		Stadium: Thiên Trường Stadium; Attendance: 3,923; Referee: Mohammed Al-Shammar (Qatar)

5 February 2026 5	Lion City Sailors (Singapore)	0–2	(Cambodia) PKR Svay Rieng	Jalan Besar, Singapore
	Anderson Lopes (yellow card) 66'	Report	Patrick 51', 64'; Cristian Roque (yellow card) 61'	Stadium: Jalan Besar Stadium; Referee: Kim Hee-gon (South Korea)

== Competition (SPL2) ==
Win Draw Loss

1 September 2025 1	Lion City Sailors (Singapore)	1–3	(Singapore) Tanjong Pagar United	Jurong East
	Naufal Azman 88'; Aaryan Fikri (yellow card) 70' (yellow-red card) 74'; Faisal Shahril (yellow card) 28'		Sahil Suhaimi 4'; Syahrul Sazali 81'; Guilherme Rodrigues 83'; Azim Akbar (yellow card) 64'; Fathullah Rahmat (yellow card) 90'	Stadium: Jurong East Stadium; Referee: Andrea Verolino

10 September 2025 2	BG Tampines Rovers (Singapore)	2–1	(Singapore) Lion City Sailors	Tampines
	Faris Ramli 32'; Tallo Ngao 80'		Namsang Rai 78'; Faisal Shahril (yellow card) 68'	Stadium: Our Tampines Hub; Referee: Muhammad Zulfiqar

29 September 2025 3	Lion City Sailors (Singapore)	1–1	(Singapore) Balestier Khalsa	Choa Chu Kang
	Ahmad Danial 42'; Faisal Shahril (yellow card) 90'		Ifat Sha'aban 70' (pen.); Adly Irfan (yellow card) 57'; Syafi Hilman (yellow card) 84'	Stadium: Choa Chu Kang Stadium; Referee: Syarqawi Buhari

7 October 2025 4	Hougang United (Singapore)	2–2	(Singapore) Lion City Sailors	Choa Chu Kang
	Hugo Kametani 14'; Haiqal Pashia 79'; Víctor Blasco (yellow card) 58'; Rishon Soroya (yellow card) 67'		Abdul Rasaq 16', 85'; Adam Faisal (yellow card) 28'; Zulqarnaen Suzliman (yellow card) 55'; Danish Irfan Azman (yellow card) 82'	Stadium: Choa Chu Kang Stadium; Referee: Aldrick Lee

15 October 2025 5	Lion City Sailors (Singapore)	1–0	(Singapore) Young Lions	Bishan
	Abdul Rasaq 28'; Naufal Azman (yellow card) 72'; Aiman Zayani (yellow card) 76'; Nur Adam Abdullah (yellow card) 82'; Zulqarnaen Suzliman (yellow card) 88'		Marcus Mosses (yellow card) 90'	Stadium: Bishan Stadium; Referee: Mazlan Pagira

29 October 2025 6	Lion City Sailors (Singapore)	0–2	(Japan) Albirex Niigata (S)	Bishan
	Akmal Azman (yellow card) 90'		Aneeq Fairus 14'; Soshi Kadowaki 87'	Stadium: Bishan Stadium; Referee: Ahmad A'Qashah

11 November 2025 7	Geylang International (Singapore)	2–1	(Singapore) Lion City Sailors	Tampines
	Raiyan Noor 20', 83'; Shaquille Danish (yellow card) 90+2'		Naufal Azman 19'; Yasir Nizamudin (yellow card) 64'; Namsang Rai (yellow card) 88'	Stadium: Our Tampines Hub; Referee: Yazid Abdul Latiff

17 November 2025 8	Tanjong Pagar United (Singapore)	4–2	(Singapore) Lion City Sailors	Jurong East
	Aaron Evans 9'; Bruno Dybal 50'; Youssef Ezzejjari 55'; Lee Hyun-sub 81'; Aloysius Pang (yellow card) 72'		Yasir Nizamudin 65'; Ikmal Hazlan 90'	Stadium: Jurong East Stadium; Referee: Muhammad Zulfiqar

2 December 2025 9	Lion City Sailors (Singapore)	2–1	(Singapore) Geylang International	Bishan
	Akmal Azman 35'; Namsang Rai 77'; Danish Irfan Azman (yellow card) 53'		Prince Rio Rifae'i 25'; Ryu Hardy (yellow card) 45'; Ethan Pinto (yellow card) 49'; Nur Ikhsanuddin (yellow card) 52'	Stadium: Bishan Stadium; Referee: Farhad Mohamed

15 December 2025 10	Balestier Khalsa (Singapore)	0–5	(Singapore) Lion City Sailors	Bishan
	Syabil Hisham (yellow card) 56'		Ahmad Danial 19'; Lin Ze hao 58' (o.g.); Adam Faisal 85'; Ikmal Hazlan 89'; Aiman Zayani 90+2'; Aaryan Fikri (yellow card) 36'	Stadium: Bishan Stadium; Referee: Muhammad Noor Adzdzeeq

5 January 2026 11	Lion City Sailors (Singapore)	2–3	(Singapore) Hougang United	Bishan
	Namsang Rai 45'; Ikmal Hazlan 59' (yellow card) 77'; Adam Faisal (yellow card) 44'		Chonlawit Kanuengkid 38'; Syady Sufwan 71' (pen.); Khilfi Aniq 89'; Kanok Kongsimma (yellow card) 48'; Brant Tan (yellow card) 74'; G. Jeeva (yellow card) 90'	Stadium: Bishan Stadium; Referee: Aldrick Lee

13 January 2026 12 (Rescheduled)	Young Lions (Singapore)	0–2	(Singapore) Lion City Sailors	Jalan Besar
	Marcus Mosses (red card) 45'		Ahmad Danial 82'; Ikmal Hazlan 90'	Stadium: Jalan Besar Stadium; Referee: Syarqawi Buhari

21 January 2026 13	Albirex Niigata (S) (Japan)	2–1	(Singapore) Lion City Sailors	Jurong East
	Ryang Hyon-ju 4'; Soshi Kadowaki 90+2'; Aqil Zafri (yellow card) 36'		Namsang Rai 74'; Yasir Nizamudin (yellow card) 41'	Stadium: Jurong East Stadium; Referee: Yazid Abdul Latiff

28 April 2026 14 (Rescheduled)	Lion City Sailors (Singapore)	3–2	(Singapore) BG Tampines Rovers	Bishan
	Ahmad Danial 6', 58'; Raiyan Izdihar 42'; Aaryan Fikri (yellow card) 65'; Namsang Rai (yellow card) 75'		Zikos Chua 2'; Talla Ndao 75'; Ong Yu En (yellow card) 48'; Adly Nufail (yellow card) 90+3'	Stadium: Bishan Stadium; Referee: Oswind Suriya

3 February 2026 15	Lion City Sailors (Singapore)	2–3	(Singapore) Tanjong Pagar United	Bishan
	Adam Faisal 32'; Aiman Zayani 82' (yellow card) 75'		Naqiuddin Eunos 17', 36'; Faisal Roslan 90'; Haziq Zulkifli (yellow card) 65'	Stadium: Bishan Stadium; Referee: Taufik Thana

24 February 2026 16	Geylang International (Singapore)	1–1	(Singapore) Lion City Sailors	Tampines
	Timothy Cheng 7', 54'; Sho Gamo (yellow card) 51'; Andry Akimi (yellow card) 90'		Ahmad Danial 21'; Nur Adam Abdulla (yellow card) 61'; Ikmal Hazlan (yellow card) 71'	Stadium: Our Tampines Hub; Referee: Hilmi Fuad

17 March 2026 17	Lion City Sailors (Singapore)	1–4	(Singapore) Balestier Khalsa	Bishan
	Adam Faisal 13'; Akmal Azman (yellow card) 45'		Irfan Iskandar 8', 27' (yellow card) 38'; Yanir Ben Eliezer 32'; Aqil Dany 75'; Syabil Hisham (yellow card) 14'; Ifat Sha'aban (yellow card) 62'	Stadium: Bishan Stadium; Referee: Khairul Amri

31 March 2026 18	Hougang United (Singapore)	2–1	(Singapore) Lion City Sailors	Jalan Besar
	Wong Ngang Haang 77'; Chonlawit Kanuengkid 81'; Ganesan Silloren (yellow card) 19'; Matin Manaf (yellow card) 20'; Brant Tan (yellow card) 45'; Syady Sufwan (yellow card) 83'; Chun Wei Woo (yellow card) 90+1'		Ahmad Danial 10'; Ikmal Hazlan (yellow card) 19'; Raiyan Izdihar (yellow card) 57'	Stadium: Jalan Besar Stadium; Referee: Oswind Suriya

7 April 2026 19	Lion City Sailors (Singapore)	2–5	(Singapore) Young Lions	Bishan
	Sérgio Mendonça 11', 63', 70'; Adam Irfan 86', 90+5'; Adam Faisal (yellow card) 14'		Ahmad Danial 20'; Yasir Nizamudin 89'; Iryan Fandi (yellow card) 58'; Harith Danish Irwan (yellow card) 78'	Stadium: Bishan Stadium; Referee: Aldrick Lee

14 April 2026 20	Lion City Sailors (Singapore)	2–0	(Japan) Albirex Niigata (S)	Jurong East
	Aiman Zayani 16' (yellow card) 90+5'; Ahmad Danial 47' (pen.); Aaryan Fikri (yellow card) 60'; Adam Faisal (yellow card) 68'; Ikmal Hazlan (yellow card) 90'		Ren Nishimura (yellow card) 21'; Aqil Zafri (yellow card) 51'; Daniel Martens (yellow card) 83'	Stadium: Jurong East Stadium; Referee: Yazid Abdul Latiff

21 April 2026 21	BG Tampines Rovers (Singapore)	1–2	(Singapore) Lion City Sailors	Tampines
	Tallo Ngao 30' (pen.); Qylfie Ryan (yellow card) 85'		Ahmad Danial 65', 89'	Stadium: Our Tampines Hub; Referee: Aldrick Lee

Pos	Team	Pld	W	D	L	GF	GA	GD	Pts	Qualification or relegation
1	Albirex Niigata (S) II	21	14	1	6	50	23	+27	43	Inaugural Champion
2	Young Lions B	21	13	1	7	52	31	+21	40	
3	BG Tampines Rovers II	21	12	2	7	46	30	+16	38	
4	Geylang International II	21	9	4	8	36	38	−2	31	
5	Tanjong Pagar United II	21	9	3	9	34	43	−9	30	
6	Lion City Sailors II	21	7	2	12	35	41	−6	23	
7	Hougang United II	21	5	4	12	28	43	−15	19	
8	Balestier Khalsa II	21	5	3	13	25	57	−32	18	

First match(es) will be played: 7 May 2026. Source: Singapore Premier League
Rules for classification: 1) points; 2) goal difference; 3) number of goals scored; 4) number of wins

== Competition (U18) ==
=== Adidas Elite Youth Cup ===
Sailors Development Center

7 September 2025 1	British Football Academy (United Kingdom)	1–3	(Singapore) Sailors Development Center	Woodlands, Singapore
				Stadium: Singapore Sports School

14 September 2025 2	Sailors Development Center (Singapore)	1–2	(Singapore) Lion City Sailors	Tampines, Singapore
				Stadium: SAFRA Tampines

30 November 2025 3 (Rescheduled)	Singapore Football Club	–	(Singapore) Sailors Development Center	Tampines, Singapore
				Stadium: SAFRA Tampines

5 October 2025 4	Sailors Development Center (Singapore)	13–0	(United Kingdom) British Football Academy	Woodlands, Singapore
				Stadium: Singapore Sports School

26 October 2025 5	Lion City Sailors (Singapore)	4–0	(Singapore) Sailors Development Center	Tampines, Singapore
				Stadium: SAFRA Tampines

9 November 2025 6	Sailors Development Center (Singapore)	8–0	Singapore Football Club	Woodlands, Singapore
				Stadium: Singapore Sports School

Lion City Sailors

7 September 2025 1	Singapore Football Club	3–2	(Singapore) Lion City Sailors	Tampines, Singapore
				Stadium: SAFRA Tampines

14 September 2025 2	Sailors Development Center (Singapore)	1–2	(Singapore) Lion City Sailors	Tampines, Singapore
				Stadium: SAFRA Tampines

28 September 2025 3	British Football Academy (United Kingdom)	0–5	(Singapore) Lion City Sailors	Tampines, Singapore
				Stadium: SAFRA Tampines

5 October 2025 4	Lion City Sailors (Singapore)	9–0	Singapore Football Club	Tampines, Singapore
				Stadium: SAFRA Tampines

26 October 2025 5	Lion City Sailors (Singapore)	4–0	(Singapore) Sailors Development Center	Tampines, Singapore
				Stadium: SAFRA Tampines

9 November 2025 6	Lion City Sailors (Singapore)	13–0	(United Kingdom) British Football Academy	Tampines, Singapore
				Stadium: SAFRA Tampines

== Competition (U19) ==
=== 2026 ===
2026 Division 1 (Stage 1) League matches & table

28 February 2026 1	Lion City Sailors (Singapore)	6–2	(Singapore) BG Tampines Rovers	Woodleigh
				Stadium: The Arena

7 March 2026 2	Lion City Sailors (Singapore)	1–1	(Singapore) Mattar Sailors	Kallang
				Stadium: Kallang Football Hub

28 March 2026 3	Lion City Sailors (Singapore)	8–0	(Singapore) Balestier Khalsa	Yishun
				Stadium: Yishun Stadium

23 May 2026 4 (Rescheduled)	Lion City Sailors (Singapore)	2–1	(Singapore) Albirex Jurong	Kallang
				Stadium: Kallang Football Hub

18 April 2026 5	Lion City Sailors (Singapore)	3–1	(Singapore) Hougang United	Yishun
				Stadium: Yishun Stadium

2 May 2026 6	Lion City Sailors (Singapore)	3–0	(Singapore) Tanjong Pagar United	Kallang
				Stadium: Kallang Football Hub

9 May 2026 7	Lion City Sailors (Singapore)	4–1	(Singapore) Coerver Coaching	Clementi
				Stadium: Clementi Stadium

16 May 2026 8	Lion City Sailors (Singapore)	2–1	(Singapore) Geylang International	Kallang
				Stadium: Kallang Football Hub

Pos	Team	Pld	W	D	L	GF	GA	GD	Pts	Qualification or relegation
1	Lion City Sailors	8	7	1	0	29	7	+22	22	League champion
2	Geylang International	8	6	1	1	22	10	+12	19	
3	Mattar Sailors	8	6	1	1	19	8	+11	19	
4	Albirex Jurong	8	3	1	4	10	11	−1	10	
5	BG Tampines Rovers	8	2	2	4	15	20	−5	8	
6	Balestier Khalsa	8	2	2	4	6	20	−14	8	
7	Tanjong Pagar United	8	2	1	5	13	15	−2	7	
8	Coerver Coaching	8	1	2	5	13	20	−7	5	
9	Hougang United	8	1	1	6	7	23	−16	4	

Updated to match(es) played on 31 May 2026. Source: Singapore Youth League

== Competition (U17) ==
Win Draw Loss

=== 2025 ===
2025 Division 1 (Stage 1) League matches & table

8 February 2025 1	Lion City Sailors (Singapore)	4–0	(Singapore) BG Tampines Rovers	Choa Chu Kang
				Stadium: Choa Chu Kang Stadium

15 February 2025 2	Lion City Sailors (Singapore)	3–2	(Japan) Albirex Niigata (S)	Bendemeer
				Stadium: St Wilfred Field

1 March 2025 3	Lion City Sailors (Singapore)	2–2	(Singapore) ActiveSG FA	Woodlands
	Lim Kai Sheun 1'; Arihaan Bose 29'		Jadon Quah 62', 74'	Stadium: Woodlands Stadium

19 April 2025 4 (Rescheduled)	Lion City Sailors (Singapore)	1–2	(Singapore) Geylang International	Kallang
				Stadium: Kallang Football Hub

Match is postponed due to incremental weather

31 May 2025 5 (Rescheduled)	Lion City Sailors (Singapore)	3–0	(Singapore) Balestier Khalsa	Clementi
				Stadium: Clementi Stadium

Match is postponed due to incremental weather

12 April 2025 6	Lion City Sailors (Singapore)	3–2	(Singapore) Tanjong Pagar United	Kallang
				Stadium: Kallang Football Hub

10 May 2025 7 (Rescheduled)	Lion City Sailors (Singapore)	4–0	(Singapore) St Michael Soccer Academy	Woodlands
				Stadium: Woodlands Stadium

Match is postponed due to 2025 General Election

17 May 2025 8 (Rescheduled)	Lion City Sailors (Singapore)	5–0	(Singapore) Hougang United	Kallang
				Stadium: Kallang Football Hub

Match is postponed due to 2025 General Election

24 May 2025 9 (Rescheduled)	Lion City Sailors (Singapore)	10–0	(Singapore) Star Soccer Academy	Kallang
				Stadium: Kallang Football Hub

Match is postponed due to 2025 General Election

Pos	Team	Pld	W	D	L	GF	GA	GD	Pts	Qualification or relegation
1	Lion City Sailors DC	9	7	1	1	35	8	+27	22	League champion
2	Geylang International	9	6	3	0	25	9	+16	21	
3	ActiveSG FA	9	6	2	1	27	10	+17	20	
4	BG Tampines Rovers	9	5	1	3	21	12	+9	16	
5	Balestier Khalsa	9	4	2	3	11	13	−2	14	
6	(Japan) Albirex Niigata (S)	9	4	1	4	15	12	+3	13	
7	Hougang United	9	3	1	5	6	18	−12	10	
8	Tanjong Pagar United	9	2	2	5	15	19	−4	8	
9	St Michael Soccer Academy	9	1	1	7	11	30	−19	4	Relegated to 2025 Stage 2 Div 2
10	Star Soccer Academy	9	0	0	9	0	35	−35	0	Relegated to 2025 Stage 2 Div 2

Updated to match(es) played on 31 May 2025. Source: Singapore Youth League

2025 Division 1 (Stage 2) League matches & table

16 August 2025 1	Lion City Sailors (Singapore)	4–0	(Singapore) BG Tampines Rovers	Bedok
				Stadium: Bedok Stadium

23 August 2025 2	Lion City Sailors (Singapore)	10–0	(Singapore) Verde Cresta Combined	Clementi
				Stadium: Clementi Stadium

30 August 2025 3	Lion City Sailors (Singapore)	4–0	(Singapore) Balestier Khalsa	Woodlands
				Stadium: Woodlands Stadium

6 September 2025 4	Lion City Sailors (Singapore)	3–0	(Japan) Albirex Niigata (S)	Bedok
				Stadium: Bedok Stadium

13 September 2025 5	Lion City Sailors (Singapore)	5–0	(Singapore) Hougang United	Yishun
				Stadium: Yishun Stadium

20 September 2025 6	Lion City Sailors (Singapore)	2–0	(Singapore) Coerver Coaching	Clementi
				Stadium: Clementi Stadium

27 September 2025 7	Lion City Sailors (Singapore)	2–1	(Singapore) Tanjong Pagar United	Kallang
				Stadium: Kallang Football Hub

25 October 2025 8	Lion City Sailors (Singapore)	2–1	(Singapore) ActiveSG	Kallang
				Stadium: Kallang Football Hub

1 November 2025 9	Lion City Sailors (Singapore)	1–2	(Singapore) Geylang International	Clementi
				Stadium: Clementi Stadium

Pos	Team	Pld	W	D	L	GF	GA	GD	Pts	Qualification or relegation
1	Lion City Sailors (C)	9	8	0	1	33	4	+29	24	League champion
2	Geylang International	9	8	0	1	37	14	+23	24	
3	ActiveSG FA (W)	9	6	0	3	26	8	+18	18	Withdrew from the 2026 SYL season
4	Tanjong Pagar United	9	4	2	3	29	11	+18	14	
5	BG Tampines Rovers	9	4	2	3	23	20	+3	14	
6	Balestier Khalsa	9	4	1	4	17	17	0	13	
7	(Japan) Albirex Niigata (S)	9	4	1	4	18	23	−5	13	
8	Coerver Coaching (W)	9	3	0	6	10	20	−10	9	Withdrew from the 2026 SYL season U17 to play in U19 league
9	Hougang United (R)	9	1	0	8	8	29	−21	3	Relegated to 2026 Division 2
10	Verde Cresta Combined (R)	9	0	0	9	9	64	−55	0	Relegated to 2026 Division 2

Updated to match(es) played on 8 November 2025. Source: Singapore Youth League
(C) Champions; (R) Relegated; (W) Withdrew

=== 2026 ===
2026 Division 1 (Stage 1) League matches & table

15 February 2026 1	Lion City Sailors (Singapore)	4–0	(Singapore) BG Tampines Rovers	Woodlands
				Stadium: Republic Poly

1 March 2026 2	Lion City Sailors (Singapore)	4–0	(Singapore) National Developmental Centre	Kallang
				Stadium: Kallang Football Hub

8 March 2026 3	Lion City Sailors (Singapore)	3–0	(Singapore) Balestier Khalsa	Woodlands
				Stadium: Singapore Sports School

29 March 2026 4	Lion City Sailors (Singapore)	4–3	(Singapore) Albirex Jurong	Woodlands
				Stadium: Republic Poly

12 April 2026 5	Lion City Sailors (Singapore)	7–1	(Singapore) St Michael's Soccer Academy	Yishun
				Stadium: Yishun Stadium

19 April 2026 6	Lion City Sailors (Singapore)	3–0	(Singapore) East Coast United	Clementi
				Stadium: Clementi Stadium

26 April 2026 7	Lion City Sailors (Singapore)	2–0	(Singapore) Tanjong Pagar United	Woodlands
				Stadium: Singapore Sports School

3 May 2026 8	Lion City Sailors (Singapore)	5–1	(Singapore) Development Centre AFA	Woodlands
				Stadium: Republic Poly

10 May 2026 9	Lion City Sailors (Singapore)	5–1	(Singapore) Geylang International	Clementi
				Stadium: Clementi Stadium

Pos	Team	Pld	W	D	L	GF	GA	GD	Pts	Qualification or relegation
1	Lion City Sailors	9	9	0	0	37	6	+31	27	League champion
2	St Michael Soccer Academy	9	6	2	1	22	13	+9	20	
3	Geylang International	9	5	2	2	17	11	+6	17	
4	BG Tampines Rovers	9	5	1	3	15	15	0	16	
5	Development Centre AFA	9	4	1	4	9	12	−3	13	
6	National Development Centre	9	3	2	4	7	14	−7	11	
7	Albirex Jurong	9	3	1	5	15	18	−3	10	
8	Tanjong Pagar United	9	3	0	6	15	16	−1	9	
9	Balestier Khalsa	9	2	1	6	7	15	−8	7	Relegated to 2026 Stage 2 Division 2
10	East Coast United	9	0	0	9	4	28	−24	0	Relegated to 2026 Stage 2 Division 2

Updated to match(es) played on 30 May 2026. Source: Singapore Youth League

== Competition (U16) ==
=== JDT International Invitation Games ===
13 February 2026 1	Buriram United (Thailand)	–	(Singapore) Lion City Sailors	Johor
				Stadium: JDT II Training Ground

15 February 2026 1	Bali United (Indonesia)	2–2	(Singapore) Lion City Sailors	Johor
				Stadium: JDT II Training Ground

== Competition (U15) ==
Win Draw Loss

=== 2025 ===
2025 Division 1 (Stage 1) League matches & table

8 February 2025 1	Lion City Sailors (Singapore)	0–2	(Spain) Barcelona Academy	Yishun
				Stadium: Yishun Stadium

24 May 2025 2 (Rescheduled)	Lion City Sailors (Singapore)	1–2	(Japan) Albirex Niigata (S)	Clementi
				Stadium: Clementi Stadium

Match is postponed due to incremental weather

22 February 2025 3	Lion City Sailors (Singapore)	1–2	Singapore Sports School	Woodlands
				Stadium: Singapore Sports School

1 March 2025 4	Lion City Sailors (Singapore)	1–1	(Singapore) ActiveSG FA	Bedok
				Stadium: Bedok Stadium

15 March 2025 5	Lion City Sailors (Singapore)	2–2	(Singapore) BG Tampines Rovers	Clementi
				Stadium: Clementi Stadium

31 May 2025 6 (Rescheduled)	Lion City Sailors (Singapore)	5–1	(Singapore) Balestier Khalsa	Clementi
				Stadium: Clementi Stadium

Match is postponed due to incremental weather

7 June 2025 7 (Rescheduled)	Lion City Sailors (Singapore)	2–1	(Singapore) Tanjong Pagar United	Kallang
				Stadium: Kallang Football Hub

Match is postponed due to 2025 General Election

10 May 2025 8 (Rescheduled)	Lion City Sailors (Singapore)	6–1	(Singapore) National Development Centre	Kallang
				Stadium: Kallang Football Hub

Match is postponed due to 2025 General Election

17 May 2025 9 (Rescheduled)	Lion City Sailors (Singapore)	1–2	(Singapore) Geylang International	Bedok
				Stadium: Bedok Stadium

Match is postponed due to 2025 General Election

Pos	Team	Pld	W	D	L	GF	GA	GD	Pts	Qualification or relegation
1	Geylang International	9	8	1	0	26	9	+17	25	League champions
2	(Japan) Albirex Niigata (S)	9	6	0	3	26	16	+10	18	
3	BG Tampines Rovers	9	5	2	2	22	9	+13	17	
4	(Singapore) Active SG	9	4	2	3	17	13	+4	14	
5	Singapore Sports School	9	4	2	3	16	14	+2	14	
6	Tanjong Pagar United	9	4	1	4	14	13	+1	13	
7	Lion City Sailors	9	3	2	4	19	14	+5	11	
8	(Singapore) National Development Centre U14	9	2	1	6	13	22	−9	7	
9	Balestier Khalsa	9	2	1	6	13	28	−15	7	Relegated to 2025 Stage 2 Div 2
10	(Spain) Barcelona Academy	9	1	0	8	9	37	−28	3	Relegated to 2025 Stage 2 Div 2

Updated to match(es) played on 7 July 2025. Source: Singapore Youth League

2025 Division 1 (Stage 2) League matches & table

17 August 2025 1	Lion City Sailors (Singapore)	3–0	(Japan) Albirex Niigata (S)	Woodlands
				Stadium: Woodlands Stadium

23 August 2025 2	Lion City Sailors (Singapore)	0–1	(Singapore) Geylang International	Woodlands
				Stadium: Woodlands Stadium

30 August 2025 3	Lion City Sailors (Singapore)	3–2	(Singapore) Tanjong Pagar United	Bedok
				Stadium: Bedok Stadium

6 September 2025 4	Lion City Sailors (Singapore)	6–0	(Singapore) East Coast United	Woodlands
				Stadium: Woodlands Stadium

13 September 2025 5	Lion City Sailors (Singapore)	1–2	Singapore Sports School	Woodlands
				Stadium: Singapore Sports School

20 September 2025 6	Lion City Sailors (Singapore)	0–2	(Singapore) BG Tampines Rovers	Clementi
			Rifque Safi	Stadium: Clementi Stadium

27 September 2025 7	Lion City Sailors (Singapore)	1–3	(Singapore) ActiveSG	Clementi
				Stadium: Clementi Stadium

25 October 2025 8	Lion City Sailors (Singapore)	2–0	(Singapore) Hougang United	Bedok
				Stadium: Bedok Stadium

1 November 2025 9	Lion City Sailors (Singapore)	2–2	(Singapore) National Development Centre	Kallang
				Stadium: Kallang Football Hub

Pos	Team	Pld	W	D	L	GF	GA	GD	Pts	Qualification or relegation
1	BG Tampines Rovers (C)	9	8	0	1	26	7	+19	24	League champions
2	Geylang International	9	7	2	0	25	4	+21	23	
3	(Singapore) National Development Centre	9	5	2	2	17	11	+6	17	
4	Singapore Sports School	9	5	1	3	13	9	+4	16	
5	Lion City Sailors	9	4	1	4	18	12	+6	13	
6	(Singapore) Active SG (W)	9	3	4	2	18	14	+4	13	Withdrew from 2026 league
7	(Japan) Albirex Niigata (S)	9	2	2	5	19	22	−3	8	
8	Tanjong Pagar United	9	1	2	6	9	20	−11	5	
9	Hougang United (R)	9	1	1	7	6	25	−19	4	Relegated to 2026 Stage 1 Div 1
10	East Coast United Academy (R)	9	0	3	6	8	35	−27	3	Relegated to 2026 Stage 1 Div 1

Updated to match(es) played on 8 November 2025. Source: Singapore Youth League
(C) Champions; (R) Relegated; (W) Withdrew

=== 2026 ===
2026 Division 1 (Stage 1) League matches & table

2026 1 (Rescheduled)	Lion City Sailors (Singapore)	3–0	(Singapore) Development Centre AFA	Woodleigh
				Stadium: The Arena

Match is postponed due to incremental weather

28 February 2026 2	Lion City Sailors (Singapore)	14–0	(Singapore) Tasek Sailors West	Serangoon
				Stadium: Serangoon Stadium

7 March 2026 3	Lion City Sailors (Singapore)	2–2	(Singapore) National Development Centre	Kallang
				Stadium: Kallang Football Hub

28 March 2026 4	Lion City Sailors (Singapore)	3–1	Singapore Sports School	Woodlands
				Stadium: Singapore Sports School

11 April 2026 5	Lion City Sailors (Singapore)	0–1	(Singapore) Tanjong Pagar United	Clementi
				Stadium: Clementi Stadium

18 April 2026 6	Lion City Sailors (Singapore)	2–2	(Singapore) Albirex Jurong	Yishun
				Stadium: Yishun Stadium

25 April 2026 7	Lion City Sailors (Singapore)	0–2	(Singapore) Balestier Khalsa	Yishun
				Stadium: Yishun Stadium

2026 8 (Rescheduled)	Lion City Sailors (Singapore)	0–1	(Singapore) BG Tampines Rovers	Woodlands
				Stadium: Singapore American School

Match is postponed due to incremental weather

9 May 2026 9	Lion City Sailors (Singapore)	2–1	(Singapore) Geylang International	Bedok
				Stadium: Bedok Stadium

Pos	Team	Pld	W	D	L	GF	GA	GD	Pts	Qualification or relegation
1	Balestier Khalsa	9	6	3	0	33	12	+21	21	
2	Geylang International	9	5	3	1	29	10	+19	18	
3	National Development Centre	9	5	2	2	32	20	+12	17	
4	Singapore Sports School	9	5	2	2	23	14	+9	17	
5	Lion City Sailors	9	4	2	3	26	10	+16	14	
6	Tanjong Pagar United	9	4	2	3	21	22	−1	14	
7	Albirex Jurong	9	4	1	4	32	20	+12	13	
8	BG Tampines Rovers	9	3	1	5	23	18	+5	10	
9	Development Centre AFA	9	1	0	8	9	36	−27	3	Relegated to 2026 Stage 2 Div 2
10	Tasek Sailors West	9	0	0	9	7	73	−66	0	Relegated to 2026 Stage 2 Div 2

Updated to match(es) played on 30 May 2026. Source: Singapore Youth League

== Competition (U14) ==
Win Draw Loss

=== 2025 ===
2025 Division 1 (Stage 1) League matches & table

9 February 2025 1	Lion City Sailors (Singapore)	6–1	(Singapore) EuroAsia	Yuan Ching
				Stadium: Yuan Ching Secondary School

16 February 2025 2	Lion City Sailors (Singapore)	2–1	(Singapore) Woodlands Lions	Sembawang
				Stadium: Canberra Secondary School

23 February 2025 3	Lion City Sailors (Singapore)	8–4	(Singapore) Balestier Khalsa	Bedok
				Stadium: Bedok Stadium

2 March 2025 4	Lion City Sailors (Singapore)	3–1	(Singapore) St Michael Soccer Academy	Kallang
				Stadium: Kallang Football Hub

16 March 2025 5	Lion City Sailors (Singapore)	3–2	(Singapore) Active SG	Kallang
				Stadium: Kallang Football Hub

6 April 2025 6	Lion City Sailors (Singapore)	0–1	(Singapore) Geylang International	Kallang
				Stadium: Kallang Football Hub

13 July 2025 7 (Rescheduled)	Lion City Sailors (Singapore)	13–1	(Singapore) Albirex SG FA	Kallang
				Stadium: Kallang Football Hub

Match is postponed due to 2025 General Election

4 May 2025 8	Lion City Sailors (Singapore)	5–1	(Singapore) National Development Centre	Kallang
				Stadium: Kallang Football Hub

11 May 2025 9	Lion City Sailors (Singapore)	11–1	(Singapore) Star Soccer Academy	Jurong West
				Stadium: Hua Yi Secondary School

18 May 2025 10	Lion City Sailors (Singapore)	5–2	(Singapore) Island City	Sengkang
				Stadium: Sengkang Secondary School

1 June 2025 11	Lion City Sailors (Singapore)	7–3	(Spain) Barcelona Academy	Kallang
				Stadium: Kallang Football Hub

Pos	Team	Pld	W	D	L	GF	GA	GD	Pts	Qualification or relegation
1	Lion City Sailors (C)	11	10	0	1	63	18	+45	30	
2	Geylang International	11	10	0	1	44	12	+32	30	
3	Woodlands Lions (W)	11	7	1	3	35	20	+15	22	Withdrew from 2025 Stage 2 Div 1
4	Balestier Khalsa	11	7	0	4	47	24	+23	21	
5	(Singapore) Active SG	11	6	1	4	42	27	+15	19	
6	(Singapore) National Development Centre U13	11	6	0	5	46	28	+18	18	
7	Island City	11	5	0	6	33	29	+4	15	
8	St Michael Soccer Academy	11	5	0	6	28	27	+1	15	
9	EuroAsia	11	5	0	6	28	37	−9	15	
10	(Spain) Barcelona Academy	11	3	0	8	31	55	−24	9	
11	Star Soccer Academy (R)	11	1	0	10	11	60	−49	3	Relegated to 2025 Stage 2 Div 2
12	Albirex SG FA (R)	11	0	0	11	9	80	−71	0	Relegated to 2025 Stage 2 Div 2

Updated to match(es) played on 13 Jul 2025. Source: Singapore Youth League
(C) Champions; (R) Relegated; (W) Withdrew

2025 Division 1 (Stage 2) League matches & table

17 August 2025 1	Lion City Sailors (Singapore)	5–1	(Singapore) National Development Centre	Kallang
				Stadium: Kallang Football Hub

24 August 2025 2	Lion City Sailors (Singapore)	11–2	(Singapore) EuroAsia	Jurong West
				Stadium: Hua Yi Secondary School

31 August 2025 3	Lion City Sailors (Singapore)	4–1	(Singapore) Active SG	Sembawang
				Stadium: Canberra Secondary School

7 September 2025 4	Lion City Sailors (Singapore)	3–4	(Singapore) Balestier Khalsa	Jurong West
			Chris Lin; Sean Tan	Stadium: Hua Yi Secondary School

14 September 2025 5	Lion City Sailors (Singapore)	9–0	(Spain) Barcelona Academy	Jurong West
				Stadium: Hua Yi Secondary School

28 September 2025 (AM) 6	Lion City Sailors (Singapore)	cancelled	(Singapore) Island City	Sembawang
				Stadium: Canberra Secondary School

28 September 2025 7	Lion City Sailors (Singapore)	3–0	(Singapore) St Michael Soccer Academy	Serangoon
				Stadium: Serangoon Garden Secondary School

26 October 2025 8	Lion City Sailors (Singapore)	2–1	(Singapore) Geylang International	Kallang
				Stadium: Kallang Football Hub

2 November 2025 9	Lion City Sailors (Singapore)	4–0	(Republic of Ireland) Gaelic Lions Academy	Sengkang
				Stadium: Sengkang Secondary School

Pos	Team	Pld	W	D	L	GF	GA	GD	Pts	Qualification or relegation
1	Lion City Sailors	8	7	0	1	41	9	+32	21	
2	Geylang International	8	7	0	1	36	6	+30	21	
3	Balestier Khalsa (W)	8	5	1	2	28	19	+9	16	Withdrew from the 2026 SYL season
4	(Singapore) National Development Centre U13	8	4	1	3	17	15	+2	13	Withdrew from the 2026 SYL season
5	St Michael Soccer Academy (W)	8	3	0	5	13	34	−21	9	Withdrew from the 2026 SYL season
6	(Singapore) Active SG (W)	8	2	2	4	14	14	0	8	Withdrew from the 2026 SYL season
7	(Republic of Ireland) Gaelic Lions Academy (W)	8	1	2	5	17	32	−15	5	Withdrew from the 2026 SYL season
8	EuroAsia (W)	8	1	2	5	20	37	−17	5	Withdrew from the 2026 SYL season
9	(Spain) Barcelona Academy (R)	8	0	4	4	9	29	−20	4	Relegated to 2026 Division 2
10	Island City (W)	2	1	0	1	8	6	+2	3	Withdrew from the league after playing 2 matches

Updated to match(es) played on 9 November 2025. Source: Singapore Youth League
(R) Relegated; (W) Withdrew

=== 2026 ===
2026 Division 1 (Stage 1) League matches & table

14 February 2026 1	Lion City Sailors (Singapore)	7–1	(Singapore) National Development Centre	Kallang
				Stadium: Kallang Football Hub

28 February 2026 2	Lion City Sailors (Singapore)	8–1	(Singapore) Geylang International	Kallang
				Stadium: Kallang Football Hub

7 March 2026 3	Lion City Sailors (Singapore)	6–0	Singapore Sports School	Woodlands
				Stadium: Singapore Sports School

28 March 2026 4	Lion City Sailors (Singapore)	12–0	(Singapore) Development Centre AFA	Choa Chu Kang
				Stadium: Regent Secondary School

16 May 2026 5 (Rescheduled)	Lion City Sailors (Singapore)	10–0	(Singapore) SG7 Soccer Academic	Jurong West
				Stadium: Westwood Secondary School

18 April 2026 6	Lion City Sailors (Singapore)	5–0	(Singapore) Kids1Kick Football Academy	Jurong West
				Stadium: Westwood Secondary School

25 April 2026 7	Lion City Sailors (Singapore)	17–0	(Spain) Spanish Sportive Club Asia	Serangoon
				Stadium: Serangoon Garden Secondary School

2 May 2026 8	Lion City Sailors (Singapore)	12–1	(Singapore) Albirex SG FA	Jurong West
				Stadium: Westwood Secondary School

9 May 2026 9	Lion City Sailors (Singapore)	3–1	(Singapore) Tanjong Pagar United	Boon Lay
				Stadium: Boon Lay Secondary School

Pos	Team	Pld	W	D	L	GF	GA	GD	Pts	Qualification or relegation
1	Lion City Sailors	9	9	0	0	80	4	+76	27	League champion
2	Singapore Sports School	9	7	1	1	62	12	+50	22	
3	Geylang International	9	7	0	2	45	15	+30	21	
4	(Singapore) National Development Centre	9	6	0	3	33	23	+10	18	
5	Tanjong Pagar United	9	5	1	3	25	13	+12	16	
6	SG7 Soccer Academic	9	4	0	5	9	19	−10	12	
7	Development Centre AFA	9	3	0	6	13	39	−26	9	
8	Kids1Kick Football Academy	9	2	0	7	13	29	−16	6	
9	Albirex SG FA	9	0	1	8	12	49	−37	1	Relegated to 2026 Division 2
10	(Spain) Spanish Sportive Club Asia	9	0	1	8	10	99	−89	1	Relegated to 2026 Division 2

Updated to match(es) played on 30 May 2026. Source: Singapore Youth League

== Competition (U13) ==
Win Draw Loss

=== 2025 ===
2025 Division 1 League matches & table

8 February 2025 1	Lion City Sailors (Singapore)	5–1	(Singapore) Flair Football Academy	Boon Lay
				Stadium: Boon Lay Secondary School

5 July 2025 2 (Rescheduled)	Lion City Sailors (Singapore)	0–0	(Singapore) Geylang International	Kallang
				Stadium: Kallang Football Hub

Match is postponed due to incremental weather

22 February 2025 3	Lion City Sailors (Singapore)	6–2	(Singapore) Hougang United	Boon Lay
				Stadium: Boon Lay Secondary School

1 March 2025 4	Lion City Sailors (Singapore)	3–0	(Singapore) Island City	Sembawang
				Stadium: Canberra Secondary School

25 June 2025 5 (Rescheduled)	Lion City Sailors (Singapore)	1–2	(Malaysia) Johor Darul Ta'zim	Mattar
				Stadium: LCS Training Ground

Match is postponed due to incremental weather

26 April 2025 6 (Rescheduled)	Lion City Sailors (Singapore)	0–2	(Singapore) Tanjong Pagar United	Woodlands
				Stadium: Woodgrove Secondary School

Match is postponed due to incremental weather

12 April 2025 7	Lion City Sailors (Singapore)	6–2	(Singapore) National Development Centre	Kallang
				Stadium: Kallang Football Hub

24 May 2025 8 (Rescheduled)	Lion City Sailors (Singapore)	3–1	Singapore Sports School	Woodlands
				Stadium: Singapore Sports School

Match is postponed due to 2025 General Election

26 July 2025 9 (Rescheduled)	Lion City Sailors (Singapore)	15–1	(Singapore) ActiveSG FA	Kallang
				Stadium: Kallang Football Hub

Match is postponed due to 2025 General Election

10 May 2025 10	Lion City Sailors (Singapore)	3–1	(Japan) Albirex Niigata (S)	Woodlands
				Stadium: Woodgrove Secondary School

17 May 2025 11	Lion City Sailors (Singapore)	7–0	(Spain) Barcelona Academy	Woodlands
				Stadium: Woodgrove Secondary School

Pos	Team	Pld	W	D	L	GF	GA	GD	Pts	Qualification or relegation
1	(Malaysia) Johor Darul Ta'zim	11	10	1	0	74	8	+66	31	League champion
2	Lion City Sailors	11	9	1	1	51	10	+41	28	
3	Singapore Sports School	11	8	1	2	36	9	+27	25	
4	(Japan) Albirex Niigata (S)	11	8	1	2	38	13	+25	25	
5	Geylang International	11	7	2	2	32	11	+21	23	
6	Island City	11	4	2	5	26	38	−12	14	
7	(Singapore) National Development Centre	11	3	2	6	33	39	−6	11	
8	Tanjong Pagar United	11	3	1	7	12	31	−19	10	
9	(Spain) Barcelona Academy	11	3	1	7	21	42	−21	10	
10	Flair Football Academy	11	1	2	8	8	35	−27	5	
11	Hougang United	11	1	2	8	11	49	−38	5	Relegated to 2025 Stage 2 Div 2
12	ActiveSG Football Academy	11	0	2	9	10	67	−57	2	Relegated to 2025 Stage 2 Div 2

Updated to match(es) played on 31 Aug 2025. Source: Singapore Youth League

2025 Division 1 (Stage 2 Group B) League matches & table

6 September 2025 1	Lion City Sailors (Singapore)	13–0	(Spain) Barcelona Academy	Jurong West
				Stadium: Westwood Secondary School

13 September 2025 2	Lion City Sailors (Singapore)	3–1	(Singapore) National Development Centre	Kallang
				Stadium: Kallang Football Hub

20 September 2025 3	Lion City Sailors (Singapore)	7–1	(Singapore) Island City	Boon Lay
				Stadium: Boon Lay Secondary School

27 September 2025 4	Lion City Sailors (Singapore)	4–1	(Singapore) BG Tampines Rovers	Kallang
				Stadium: Kallang Football Hub

25 October 2025 5	Lion City Sailors (Singapore)	2–1	(Japan) Albirex Niigata (S)	Sembawang
				Stadium: Canberra Secondary School

Pos	Team	Pld	W	D	L	GF	GA	GD	Pts	Qualification or relegation
1	Lion City Sailors	5	5	0	0	29	4	+25	15	Semi Final
2	BG Tampines Rovers	5	3	0	2	19	10	+9	9	Semi Final
3	(Japan) Albirex Niigata (S)	5	3	0	2	16	7	+9	9	5th to 12th placement
4	Island City	5	3	0	2	16	16	0	9	5th to 12th placement
5	(Singapore) National Development Centre	5	1	0	4	10	23	−13	3	5th to 12th placement
6	(Spain) Barcelona Academy	5	0	0	5	5	35	−30	0	5th to 12th placement

Updated to match(es) played on 28 Oct 2025. Source: Singapore Youth League

2025 Division 1 (Stage 3) League matches

6 November 2025 Semi Final Leg 1	Lion City Sailors (Singapore)	4–2	Singapore Sports School	Woodlands
				Stadium: Singapore Sports School

8 November 2025 Semi Final Leg 2	Lion City Sailors (Singapore)	2–3 (6–5 agg.)	Singapore Sports School	Woodlands
				Stadium: Singapore Sports School

22 November 2025 Final	Lion City Sailors (Singapore)	0–2	(Malaysia) Johor Darul Ta'zim	Kallang
				Stadium: Kallang Football Hub

=== 2026 ===
2026 Division 1 (Stage 1) League matches & table

15 February 2026 1	Lion City Sailors (Singapore)	3–7	(Singapore) BG Tampines Rovers	Serangoon
				Stadium: Serangoon Garden Secondary School

1 March 2026 2	Lion City Sailors (Singapore)	9–0	(Singapore) Eastern Thunder	Sengkang
				Stadium: Sengkang Secondary School

8 March 2026 3	Lion City Sailors (Singapore)	2–0	(Singapore) National Development Centre	Kallang
				Stadium: Kallang Football Hub

17 May 2026 4 (Rescheduled)	Lion City Sailors (Singapore)	5–0	Singapore Sports School	Woodlands
				Stadium: Singapore Sports School

12 April 2026 5	Lion City Sailors (Singapore)	6–0	(Singapore) Flair Football Academy	Sengkang
				Stadium: Sengkang Secondary School

24 May 2026 6 (Rescheduled)	Lion City Sailors (Singapore)	5–3	(Singapore) Island City	Kallang
				Stadium: Kallang Football Hub

26 April 2026 7	Lion City Sailors (Singapore)	3–2	(Singapore) Hougang United	Serangoon
				Stadium: Serangoon Garden Secondary School

5 July 2026 8	Lion City Sailors (Singapore)	3–0	(Singapore) Balestier Khalsa	Kallang
				Stadium: Kallang Football Hub

10 May 2026 9	Lion City Sailors (Singapore)	1–5	(Malaysia) Johor Darul Ta’zim	Kallang
				Stadium: Kallang Football Hub

Pos	Team	Pld	W	D	L	GF	GA	GD	Pts	Qualification or relegation
1	BG Tampines Rovers	9	9	0	0	70	6	+64	27	
2	(Malaysia) Johor Darul Ta'zim	9	8	0	1	79	4	+75	24	
3	Singapore Sports School	9	7	0	2	43	11	+32	21	
4	Island City	9	6	0	3	31	33	−2	18	
5	Lion City Sailors	9	5	0	4	30	24	+6	15	
6	National Development Centre	9	3	1	5	19	21	−2	10	
7	Hougang United	9	3	1	5	23	31	−8	10	
8	Balestier Khalsa	9	2	0	7	18	34	−16	6	
9	Flair Football Academy	9	1	0	8	16	50	−34	3	
10	Eastern Thunder	9	0	0	9	1	116	−115	0	Relegated to 2026 Stage 2 Div 2

Updated to match(es) played on 31 July 2026. Source: Singapore Youth League

== Competition (U12) ==
Win Draw Loss

=== 4th LGSP Intercontinental Youth Cup ===
Group Stage

17 April 2025 1	Rio Ave FC (Portugal)	0-1	(Singapore) Lion City Sailors	Gondomar, Portugal
				Stadium: SC Rio Tinto Sports Complex; Man of the Match: Ahyan

17 July 2025 2	Lion City Sailors (Singapore)	4-0	(Sweden) IFK Stocksund	Gondomar, Portugal
				Stadium: SC Rio Tinto Sports Complex; Man of the Match: Cian

17 April 2025 3	S.C. Braga (Portugal)	6-0	(Singapore) Lion City Sailors	Gondomar, Portugal
				Stadium: SC Rio Tinto Sports Complex

18 April 2025 4	S.L. Benfica (Portugal)	3-1	(Singapore) Lion City Sailors	Gondomar, Portugal
				Stadium: SC Rio Tinto Sports Complex

Table

Pos	Team	Pld	W	D	L	GF	GA	GD	Pts
1	(Portugal) S.C. Braga	4	4	0	0	15	2	+13	12
2	(Portugal) S.L. Benfica	4	3	0	1	13	6	+7	9
3	(Singapore) Lion City Sailors	4	2	0	2	6	9	−3	6
4	(Portugal) Rio Ave FC	4	1	0	3	6	7	−1	3
5	(Sweden) IFK Stocksund	4	0	0	4	2	18	−16	0

Source: lgspintercontinentalyouthcup.com

Final Stage

18 April 2025 5	Lion City Sailors (Singapore)	2-1	(Portugal) Leixões S.C.	Gondomar, Portugal
				Stadium: SC Rio Tinto Sports Complex; Man of the Match: Raphael

18 April 2025 6	Vitória S.C. (Portugal)	0-3	(Singapore) Lion City Sailors	Gondomar, Portugal
				Stadium: SC Rio Tinto Sports Complex

19 April 2025 7	Lion City Sailors (Singapore)	0-3	(Portugal) S.C. Salgueiros	Gondomar, Portugal
10:00 GMT+1				Stadium: SC Rio Tinto Sports Complex; Man of the Match: Iqbal

Final Standings

Position	Team
10	(Portugal) F.C. Famalicão
11	(Portugal) S.C. Salgueiros
12	(Singapore) Lion City Sailors
13	(Portugal) Rio Ave FC
14	(Portugal) Leixões S.C.
15	(Portugal) S.C. Beira-Mar

Source: lgspintercontinentalyouthcup.com
