= Marin Datković =

Croatian footballer

Personal information
- Date of birth: 16 November 1988 (age 37)
- Place of birth: Rijeka, SFR Yugoslavia
- Height: 1.80 m (5 ft 11 in)
- Position: Midfielder

Youth career
- Rijeka

Senior career*
Years	Team	Apps	(Gls)
2006-2010	Rijeka	0	(0)
2007	→ Orijent 1919 (loan)		
2008	→ Novalja (loan)		
2010-	Novalja		
- * Club domestic league appearances and goals

Marin Datković (born 16 November 1988) is a football midfielder who has most recently played for HNK Rijeka in Croatia.

== Club career ==
He was football educated at the Football Academy of NK Novalja and at the Football Academy of HNK Rijeka. In 2007, with his club HNK Rijeka, he was a winner of the Croatian under-19 football cup 2007. In first half of the 2007–08 season he was loaned by HNK Rijeka (D-1 Croatia) to NK Orijent (D-3 Croatia) and since February 2008, he has been loaned by HNK Rijeka to NK Novalja (D-3 Croatia).

In the Summer of 2007 he scored one goal for HNK Rijeka against GAK Graz (Austria) in the Football Tournament for Young players Kvarnerska rivijera.

== Personal life ==
His younger brother is Toni Datković and his father is Ivica Datkovic, the head coach of NK Novalja.

== Statistics ==
- 05/2009 - 06/2011 HNK Rijeka (Prva HNL): 2 matches, 0 goals
- 2007-2008 NK Novalja (3rd Croatian League): -
- 2007-2008 NK Orijent (3rd Croatian League): 6 matches, 1 goal, 1 assist;
- 2006-2007 HNK Rijeka (1st Croatian League):
- 1st Croatian League U-19 years: 26 matches, 0 goals, 12 assists,
- Croatian Cup U-19 years: 4 goals, 2 assists,
