= Toni Datković =

Croatian footballer (born 1993)

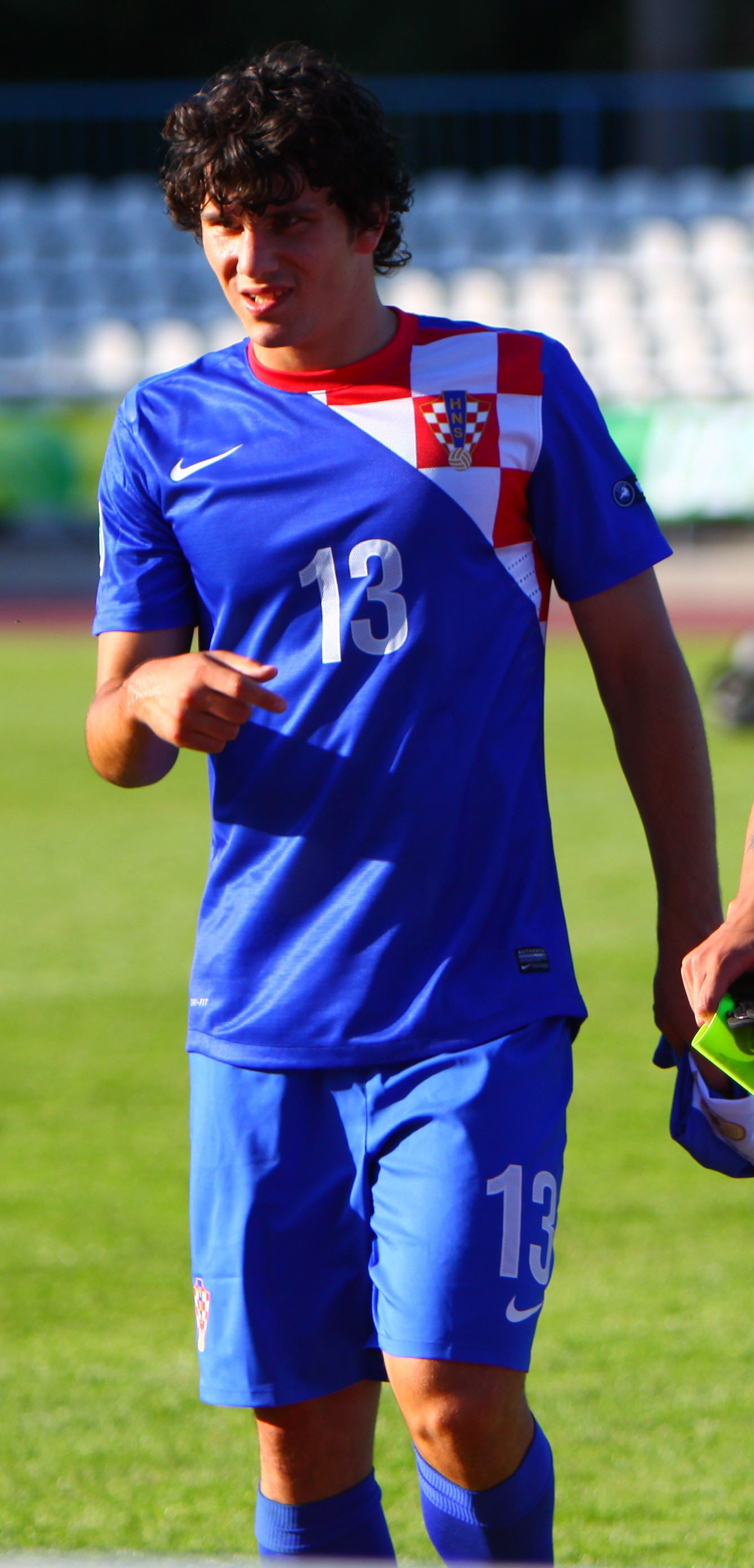
- Datković playing for Croatia U19 in 2012

Personal information
- Full name: Toni Datković
- Date of birth: 6 November 1993 (age 33)
- Place of birth: Zagreb, Croatia
- Height: 1.84 m (6 ft 1/2 in)
- Positions: Centre-back; left-back

Team information
- Current team: Lion City Sailors
- Number: 4

Youth career
- –2008: Novalja
- 2008: Rijeka
- 2008: Lokomotiva Rijeka
- 2009–2012: Rijeka

Senior career*
Years	Team	Apps	(Gls)
2012–2014	Rijeka	0	(0)
2012–2014	→ Pomorac (loan)	45	(2)
2014–2016	Zavrč	52	(3)
2016–2017	Koper	44	(5)
2017–2020	Lokomotiva	49	(3)
2019–2020	→ Huesca (loan)	17	(0)
2020–2021	Aris	0	(0)
2021	→ Cartagena (loan)	19	(0)
2021	Real Salt Lake	8	(0)
2022–2023	Cartagena	56	(0)
2023–2024	Albacete	8	(0)
2024–	Lion City Sailors	49	(7)

International career
2012	Croatia U19	3	(0)
2012	Croatia U20	1	(0)
2017	Croatia	1	(0)
- * Club domestic league appearances and goals as of 1 November 2026

Toni Datković (Croatian pronunciation: [tôni dâtkoʋitɕ, tôː-]; born 6 November 1993) is a Croatian professional footballer who plays either as a centre-back or left-back for Singapore Premier League club Lion City Sailors and the Croatia national team.

== Club career ==
=== Youth ===
Coming from the island of Pag, Datković went through the ranks of Novalja, before moving to Rijeka, where, after six months at the lower-tier side Lokomotiva, he joined the Rijeka academy. Raising through the ranks, he became the U19 team's captain.

=== HNK Rijeka ===
Datković never made his Prva HNL debut for HNK Rijeka, however, as he was sent on a loan to the Druga HNL side NK Pomorac Kostrena, where he remained for 2 years, until his contract expired.

=== NK Zavrč ===
In the summer of 2014, Datković joined the Slovenian PrvaLiga side NK Zavrč, where he played 52 league games and scored three goals.

=== FC Koper ===
On 20 January 2016, Datković joined another Slovenian club, Koper.

=== NK Lokomotiva Zagreb ===
On 11 July 2017, Datković returned home to joined Lokomotiva Zagreb.

==== Loan to SD Huesca ====
Datković moved abroad on 2 September 2019, joining Segunda División side, SD Huesca on a one-year loan deal. He helped the club to win the 2019–20 Segunda División title thus winning promotion to top flight of Spanish football, La Liga.

=== Aris Thessaloniki ===
On 18 August 2020, Datković signed a three-year contract with Aris Thessaloniki.

==== Loan to Cartagena ====
After featuring rarely, Datković returned to Spain and its second division on 10 January 2021, after agreeing to a loan deal with Cartagena until the end of the season.

=== Real Salt Lake ===
On 2 June 2021, Datković signed with Major League Soccer side Real Salt Lake on a two-year deal. He make his full match debut on 8 August in a 3–2 loss against Portland Timbers.

=== Return to Cartagena ===
On 18 January 2022, Datković returned to Cartagena after agreeing to a two-and-a-half-year contract.

=== Albacete ===
Datković terminated his contract with the Cartagena on 1 September 2023, and joined fellow second division side Albacete Balompié just hours later. On 29 January 2024, however, he also departed the latter club.

=== Lion City Sailors ===
On 21 February 2024, Datković moved to Southeast Asia to join Singapore Premier League club Lion City Sailors. On his official debut for the club on 4 May 2024, he helped his club to win the 2024 Singapore Community Shield in a 2–0 win against Albirex Niigata (S). Despite Maxime Lestienne's equaliser in the 91st minute of the 2025 AFC Champions League Two final against Sharjah, the Sailors finished as a runner-up after conceding in the 97th minute to finish the game in a 1–2 defeat.

== International career ==
Datković made his debut for Croatia during the 2017 China Cup match against China which is his sole international appearance to date.

== Personal life ==
Datković is the son of the football coach Ivica Datković, his brother Marin is also a professional football player.

== Career statistics ==
As of 25 Aug 2025

Club	Season	League			Cup		Continental		Other		Total	
Club	Season	Division	Apps	Goals	Apps	Goals	Apps	Goals	Apps	Goals	Apps	Goals
Pomorac (loan)	2012–13	2. HNL	25	1	0	0	—		—		25	1
Pomorac (loan)	2013–14	2. HNL	20	1	0	0	—		—		20	1
Pomorac (loan)	Total		45	2	0	0	—		—		45	2
Zavrč	2014–15	PrvaLiga	31	3	4	2	—		—		35	5
Zavrč	2015–16	PrvaLiga	21	0	2	0	—		—		23	0
Zavrč	Total		52	3	6	2	—		—		58	5
Koper	2015–16	PrvaLiga	14	3	—		—		—		14	3
Koper	2016–17	PrvaLiga	30	2	1	0	—		—		31	2
Koper	Total		44	5	1	0	—		—		45	5
Lokomotiva	2017–18	Prva HNL	17	0	0	0	—		—		17	0
Lokomotiva	2018–19	Prva HNL	25	2	3	2	—		—		28	4
Lokomotiva	2019–20	Prva HNL	7	1	—		—		—		7	1
Lokomotiva	Total		49	3	3	2	—		—		52	5
Huesca (loan)	2019–20	Segunda División	17	0	2	0	—		—		19	0
Huesca (loan)	Total		17	0	2	0	—		—		19	0
Aris	2020–21	Super League Greece	0	0	0	0	1	0	0	0	1	0
Aris	Total		0	0	0	0	1	0	0	0	1	0
Real Salt Lake	2021	Major League Soccer	8	0	0	0	—		—		8	0
Real Salt Lake	Total		8	0	0	0	—		—		8	0
Cartagena	2021–22	Segunda División	16	0	0	0	0	0	0	0	16	0
Cartagena	2022–23	Segunda División	39	0	2	0	0	0	0	0	41	0
Cartagena	2023–24	Segunda División	1	0	0	0	0	0	0	0	1	0
Cartagena	Total		56	0	2	0	0	0	0	0	58	0
Albacete	2023–24	Segunda División	8	0	1	0	0	0	0	0	9	0
Albacete	Total		8	0	1	0	0	0	0	0	9	0
Lion City Sailors	2024–25	Singapore Premier League	27	4	6	2	17 (Note: 5 in ASEAN Club Championship and 12 in AFC Champions League Two)	1 (Note: 1 in AFC Champions League Two)	1	0	49	6
Lion City Sailors	2025–26	Singapore Premier League	19	3	3	0	10 (Note: 4 in ASEAN Club Championship and 6 in AFC Champions League Two)	0	1 (Note: community shield appearance)	0	33	3
Lion City Sailors	2026–27	Singapore Premier League	0	0	0	0	0	0	0	0	0	0
Lion City Sailors	Total		46	7	9	2	27	1	2	0	72	9
Career total			317	20	24	6	31	0	2	0	369	26

=== International caps ===
No	Date	Venue	Opponent	Result	Competition
1	14 January 2017	Guangxi Sports Center, China	China	0-0 (draw)	Friendly

=== U20 International caps ===
No	Date	Venue	Opponent	Result	Competition
1	14 November 2012	Croatia	Slovenia	2-1 (won)	Friendly

=== U19 International caps ===
No	Date	Venue	Opponent	Result	Competition
1	7 March 2012	Kadriorg Stadium, Estonia	England	1-1 (draw)	2012 UEFA European Under-19 Championship qualification

== Honours ==
SD Huesca

- Segunda División: 2019–20

Lion City Sailors

- AFC Champions League Two runner-up: 2024–25
- Singapore Premier League: 2024–25,* Singapore Premier League: 2025–26
- Singapore Cup: 2024–25, 2025–26
- Singapore Community Shield: 2024; runner-up: 2025

Individual

- Singapore Premier League Team of the Year: 2024–25
