= 2026 Lion City Sailors Youth season =

Lion City Sailors
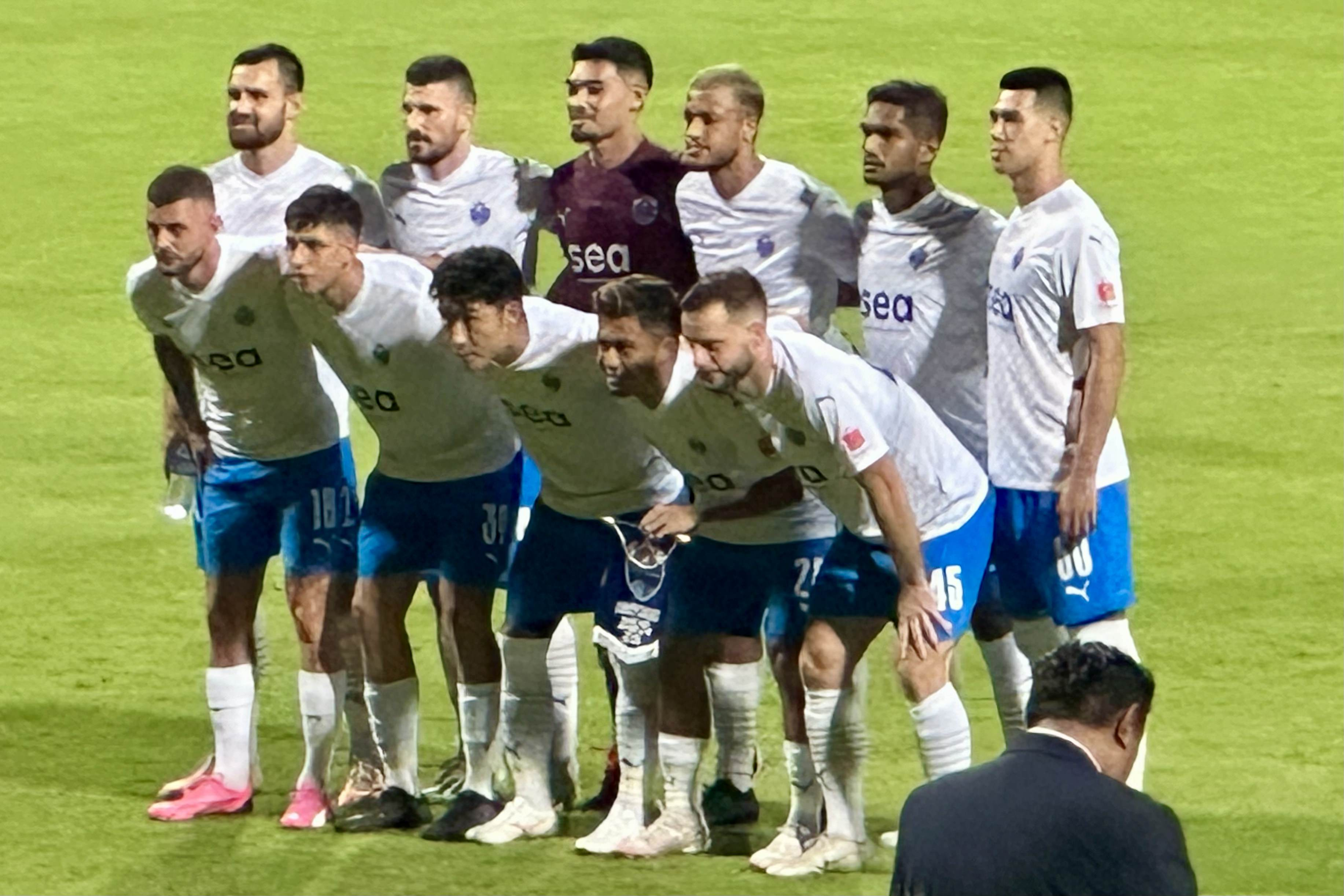
- Match between Lion City Sailors and Johor Darul Ta'zim
- Owner: Sea Limited
- Chairman: Forrest Li
- Head coach: (Spain) Jesús Casas (until 1 Sept) (Spain) Varo Moreno (England) Mark Jackson
- Stadium: Bishan Stadium
Home colours	Away colours

The 2026–26 season is Lion City Sailors' 30th consecutive season in the Singapore Premier League and the 6th season since privatising from Home United. Their youth team played in U21 league.

== Squad ==
=== Singapore Premier League ===
As of 2 August 2026

Squad No.	Name	Nationality	Date of birth (age)	Previous club	Contract since	Contract end
Goalkeepers
1	Victor Aznar	(Brazil) (Spain)	17 October 2002 (age 24)	(Spain) Cádiz	2026	2029
13	Adib Azahari	(Singapore)	9 March 1998 (age 28)	(Singapore) Young Lions	2020	2027
25	Ivan Sušak	(Croatia)	6 October 1997 (age 29)	(Croatia) Slaven Belupo	2025	2027
Defenders
2	Jorge Karseladze	(Georgia (country)) (Portugal)	18 March 2005 (age 21)	(Portugal) Rio Ave	2026	2028
3	Hugo Gomes	(Brazil)	4 January 1995 (age 31)	(Vietnam) Cong An Hanoi	2026	2028
4	Toni Datković	(Croatia)	6 November 1993 (age 33)	(Spain) Albacete	2024	2027
5	Lionel Tan	(Singapore)	5 June 1997 (age 29)	(Singapore) Hougang United	2023	2029
14	Hariss Harun (captain)	(Singapore)	9 November 1990 (age 36)	(Malaysia) Johor Darul Ta'zim	2021	2027
18	Ryhan Stewart	(Singapore) (Wales)	15 February 2000 (age 26)	(Thailand) Kanchanaburi Power	2026	2029
20	Nur Adam Abdullah	(Singapore)	13 April 2001 (age 25)	(Singapore) Young Lions	2021	2029
26	Bailey Wright (vice-captain)	(Australia)	28 July 1992 (age 34)	(England) Sunderland	2023	2027
29	Diogo Costa	(Portugal)	27 July 2003 (age 23)	(Portugal) Famalicão	2025	2030
Midfielders
6	Tsiy-William Ndenge	(Germany) (Cameroon)	13 June 1997 (age 29)	(Switzerland) Grasshopper	2025	2027
8	Kyoga Nakamura	(Singapore) (Japan)	25 April 1996 (age 30)	(Thailand) Bangkok United	2026	2028
10	Bart Ramselaar	(Netherlands)	29 June 1996 (age 30)	(Netherlands) Utrecht	2024	2028
11	Glenn Kweh	(Singapore)	26 March 2000 (age 26)	(Singapore) Tampines Rovers	2026	2028
15	Song Ui-young (CT)	(Singapore) (South Korea)	8 November 1993 (age 33)	(Indonesia) Persebaya Surabaya	2024	2027
16	Hami Syahin	(Singapore)	16 December 1998 (age 27)	(Singapore) Young Lions	2019	2027
19	Farhan Zulkifli	(Singapore)	10 November 2002 (age 24)	(Singapore) Hougang United	2026	2028
22	Nur Muhammad Asis (CT)	(Singapore)	4 March 2004 (age 22)	(Portugal) FC Vizela U23 (P2)	2022	2029
23	Matthias Phaëton	(Guadeloupe) (France)	8 January 2000 (age 26)	(Switzerland) Zürich	2026	2029
24	Giovanni Haag	(France) (Italy)	30 May 2000 (age 26)	(France) Red Star	2026	2028
30	Bobby Adekanye	(Netherlands) (Nigeria)	14 February 1999 (age 27)	(Turkey) Manisa	2026	2028
Forwards
7	Shawal Anuar	(Singapore)	29 April 1991 (age 35)	(Singapore) Hougang United	2023	2027
9	Lennart Thy	(Germany)	25 February 1992 (age 34)	(Netherlands) PEC Zwolle	2024	2027
12	Antonio Mance	(Croatia)	7 August 1995 (age 31)	(Qatar) Umm Salal	2026	2028
17	Ilhan Fandi	(Singapore) (South Africa)	8 November 2002 (age 24)	(Thailand) Buriram United	2026	2028
21	Abdul Rasaq	(Singapore) (Nigeria)	16 June 2001 (age 25)	(Singapore) Young Lions	2023	2027
Players on loan / NS
12	Benjamin Žerak	(Slovenia)	14 December 2006 (age 19)	(Singapore) Young Lions	2025	2027
80	Nathan Mao (CT)	(Singapore)	26 March 2008 (age 18)	(Singapore) Lion City Sailors U21	2022	2026
	Khairin Nadim	(Singapore)	8 May 2004 (age 22)	(Portugal) FC Vizela U23 (P2)	2026	2029
	Jonan Tan (CT)	(Singapore)	27 June 2006 (age 20)	(Portugal) FC Vizela U23 (P2)	2022	2029
Players who left mid-season

Remarks:
^{FP U21} These players are registered as U21 foreign players.
^{CT} Player who fulfils AFC's "club-trained player" criteria.

=== Singapore Premier League 2 ===
As of 7 July 2026

Squad No.	Name	Nationality	Date of birth (age)	Previous club	Contract since	Contract end
Goalkeepers
65	Ilhan Hady	(Singapore)	19 March 2010 (age 16)	(Singapore) Young Lions	2026	2027
67	Issac Goh Jun Yang	(Singapore)	5 June 2007 (age 19)	(Singapore) Young Lions	2026	2027
82	Arnav Anand Kumar ^{SPL2 & U19}	(India) (Singapore)	24 February 2010 (age 16)	(Singapore) Lion City Sailors U17	2023	2027
90	Naqeeb Shawaluddin ^{SPL2 & U19}	(Singapore)	23 August 2010 (age 16)	(Singapore) Young Lions	2026	2027
Defenders
52	Aaryan Azraqi Hermi	(Singapore)	24 February 2009 (age 17)	(Singapore) Young Lions	2026	2027
54	Aqil Khusni	(Singapore)	23 April 2004 (age 22)	(Singapore) Young Lions	2026	2027
55	Adrian Jaccard	(Singapore)	30 October 2006 (age 20)	(Singapore) Tampines Rovers U21	2026	2027
57	Caden Pereira	(Singapore)	3 February 2010 (age 16)	(Singapore) Lion City Sailors U19	2022	2027
64	Tyler Tan	(Singapore)	7 July 2010 (age 16)	(Singapore) Lion City Sailors U19	2023	2027
68	Caleb Leo Chin Hee	(Singapore)	28 March 2010 (age 16)	(Singapore) Lion City Sailors U19	2022	2027
69	Aniq Tiryaq	(Singapore)	10 October 2006 (age 20)	(Singapore) Lion City Sailors U17	2021	2027
73	Algirdas Karlonas	(Lithuania)	21 January 2009 (age 17)	(Singapore) Hougang United	2026	2027
75	Shlok Ranadive ^{SPL2 & U19}	(Singapore)	10 June 2010 (age 16)	(Singapore) Lion City Sailors U17	2025	2027
81	Zamir Nasri	(Singapore)	6 March 2009 (age 17)	(Singapore) NDC	2026	2027
Midfielders
51	Adam Faizal	(Singapore)	1 December 2009 (age 16)	(Singapore) Young Lions	2026	2027
53	Aryan Bahadur Chhetri	(Singapore)	24 February 2005 (age 21)	(Singapore) Lion City Sailors U17	2022	2027
56	Danish Irfan Hazin ^{SPL2 & U19}	(Singapore)	6 May 2009 (age 17)	(Singapore) Young Lions	2026	2027
58	Namsang Rai	(Nepal)	9 March 2006 (age 20)	(Singapore) Hougang United U21	2025	2027
59	Jasper Chen Hong-An	(Chinese Taipei)	19 April 2009 (age 17)	(Singapore) Tampines Rovers	2026	2027
60	Yasir Nizamudin	(Singapore)	21 January 2005 (age 21)	(Singapore) Lion City Sailors U21	2022	2027
62	Izrafil Yusof	(Singapore)	27 January 2004 (age 22)	(Singapore) Tanjong Pagar United	2022	2027
66	Hugh Alexander Lobsey	(Australia) (Singapore)	24 March 2009 (age 17)	(Singapore) Balestier Khalsa	2026	2027
71	Yazid Rizal Rais	(Singapore)	16 March 2006 (age 20)	(Singapore) Young Lions	2026	2027
72	Aaditya Aprameya	(India)	12 March 2009 (age 17)	(Singapore) Tampines Rovers	2026	2027
74	Iman Naqib Idris	(Singapore)	3 January 2011 (age 15)	(Singapore) Lion City Sailors U17	2024	2027
76	Isaac Matthew Saw Tian Zhi ^{SPL2 & U19}	(Singapore)	30 December 2010 (age 15)	(Singapore) Lion City Sailors U17	2023	2027
77	Aufa Basyar ^{SPL2 & U19}	(Singapore)	25 November 2011 (age 14)	(Singapore) Lion City Sailors U17	2023	2027
78	Tan Yu Bin ^{SPL2 & U19}	(Singapore)	13 October 2010 (age 16)	(Singapore) Lion City Sailors U17	2024	2027
79	Aiman Eszuan	(Singapore)	1 December 2009 (age 16)	(Singapore) Young Lions	2026	2027
80	Darwisy Fitri Johari	(Singapore)	18 February 2009 (age 17)	(Singapore) Young Lions	2026	2027
Strikers
63	Ahmad Danial	(Singapore)	16 November 2005 (age 21)	(Singapore) Tanjong Pagar United U21	2025	2027
70	Izzan Rifqi	(Singapore)	4 March 2010 (age 16)	(Singapore) Young Lions	2026	2027
Players on loan / NS
	Kenneth Ng	(Singapore)	6 February 2009 (age 17)	(Singapore) Lion City Sailors U19	2026	2027
51	Ashman Saravanan	(Singapore) (Malaysia)	5 March 2008 (age 18)	(Singapore) Young Lions	2024	2027
53	Ainun Nuha Ilyasir	(Singapore)	11 March 2006 (age 20)	(Singapore) Young Lions	2022	2027
54	Luth Harith Hadi	(Singapore)	19 March 2008 (age 18)	(Singapore) Young Lions	2022	2027
56	Muhammad Fadly	(Singapore)	30 May 2007 (age 19)	(Singapore) Young Lions	2023	2027
57	Enrico Walmrath Silveira	(Brazil)	6 April 2006 (age 20)	(Singapore) Young Lions	2023	2027
58	Iliya Naufal	(Singapore)	6 July 2008 (age 18)	(Singapore) Young Lions	2024	2027
59	Ilhan Rizqullah	(Singapore)	17 September 2008 (age 18)	(Singapore) Young Lions	2022	2026
61	Andy Reefqy	(Singapore)	14 July 2008 (age 18)	(Singapore) Young Lions	2023	2027
64	Harith Danish Irwan	(Singapore)	27 November 2008 (age 17)	(Singapore) Young Lions	2024	2027
66	Sarrvin Raj	(Singapore)	5 April 2008 (age 18)	(Singapore) Young Lions	2022	2027
67	Izzan Rifqi	(Singapore)	4 March 2010 (age 16)	(Singapore) Young Lions	2022	2027
63	Idzham Eszuan	(Singapore)	14 February 2007 (age 19)	(Singapore) Young Lions	2022	2027
76	Farrel Mohammad	(Singapore)	15 March 2009 (age 17)	(Singapore) Young Lions	2022	2027
	Fernandez Casey Klein	(Singapore) (Germany)	5 February 2007 (age 19)	(Singapore) Young Lions	2023	2027
	Uchenna Eziakor	(Singapore) (Nigeria)	17 May 2008 (age 18)	(Singapore) Young Lions	2022	2027
Players who left mid-season
71	Kian Ghadessy	(Singapore) (England) (Iran)	30 November 2005 (age 20)	(Singapore) Young Lions	2024	2027

=== U19 squad ===
Squad No.	Name	Nationality	Date of Birth (Age)	Previous Club	Contract Since	Contract End
Goalkeepers
46	Joshua Ng Shao Wen ^{U19 & U17}	(Singapore)		(Singapore) Lion City Sailors U15	2022	Dec 2026
97	Safyn Ali Sahar ^{U19 & U17}	(Singapore)		(Singapore) Lion City Sailors U15	2022	Dec 2026
98	Samuel Ambrose Lau ^{U19}	(Singapore)		(Singapore) Lion City Sailors U15	2026	Dec 2026
	Ang Siew Ee ^{U19}	(Singapore)	2008	(Singapore) Sailors Development U17	2025	2025
	Kaden Foo Kai Jun ^{U19}	(Singapore)	2008	(Singapore) Sailors Development U17	2023	2025
	Kaiden Ng ^{U21}	(Singapore)	17 October 2006 (age 20)	(Singapore) Lion City Sailors U15	2023	2023
1	Emre Masjuri ^{AFA DC U19 & AFA DC U17}	(Singapore)	2009	(Singapore) Sailors Development U15	2023	Dec 2026
18	Issac Ng Wei En ^{AFA DC U19 & AFA DC U17}	(Singapore)		(Singapore) Sailors Development U15	2022	Dec 2026
	Nor Aqmar Shamil ^{AFA DC U19}	(Singapore)	24 June 2007 (age 19)	(Singapore) Lion City Sailors	2025	Dec 2026
Defenders
85	Jacas Tjhai Jun Heo ^{U19}	(Singapore)	5 January 2010 (age 16)	(Singapore) Young Lions	2025	2027
89	Adryan Putera ^{U19 & U17}	(Singapore)		(Singapore) Lion City Sailors U17	2024	Dec 2026
92	Mohd Haqeem Hazim ^{U19 & U17}	(Singapore)		(Singapore) Lion City Sailors U15	2024	Dec 2026
95	Isyraf Khan Fhirhad ^{U19}	(Singapore)		(Singapore) Lion City Sailors U17	2024	Dec 2026
99	Dante James Pinto ^{U19}	(Singapore)	20 January 2010 (age 16)	(Singapore) Lion City Sailors U17	2023	Dec 2026
2	Leandro Naim Santos ^{AFA DC U19 & AFA DC U17}	(Brazil)		(Singapore) Sailors Development U15	2023	Dec 2026
4	Lukesh Warrier ^{AFA DC U19 & AFA DC U17}	(Singapore)		(Singapore) Sailors Development U15	2024	Dec 2026
42	Karlheinz Oma Koppe ^{AFA DC U19}	(Singapore) (Germany)	14 July 2008 (age 18)	(Singapore) Lion City Sailors	2024	Dec 2026
43	Aaryan Irzan ^{AFA DC U19}	(Singapore)	30 December 2008 (age 17)	(Singapore) Lion City Sailors	2026	Dec 2026
45	Ziqry Eizyanshah Azam ^{AFA DC U19}	(Singapore)	6 August 2008 (age 18)	(Singapore) Lion City Sailors	2024	Dec 2026
63	Norafiq Eindra ^{AFA DC U19}	(Singapore)		(Singapore) Sailors Development U15	2024	Dec 2026
64	Tanveer Nasir ^{AFA DC U19}	(Singapore)		(Singapore) ActiveSG	2026	Dec 2026
75	Alexander Koh Wen Jun ^{AFA DC U19}	(Singapore)	2 January 2008 (age 18)	(Singapore) Lion City Sailors	2025	Dec 2026
84	Keiflie Mokhzani ^{AFA DC U19}	(Singapore)		(Singapore)	2026	Dec 2026
Midfielders
57	Bryceton Pang ^{U19 & U17}	(Singapore)		(Singapore) Lion City Sailors U14	2024	Dec 2026
60	Mika Syaqeel Syaherman ^{U19 & U17}	(Singapore)		(Singapore) Lion City Sailors U15	2024	Dec 2026
63	Haziq Danial ^{U19 & U17}	(Singapore)		(Singapore) Lion City Sailors U15	2023	Dec 2026
64	Asher Jordan Morris ^{U19}	(New Zealand)		(Singapore)	2026	Dec 2026
83	Danny Mehta ^{U19}	(Singapore) (New Zealand)		(Singapore)	2026	Dec 2026
84	Ahmad Aydin ^{U19}	(Singapore)		(Singapore)	2026	Dec 2026
86	Aiden Yang Zhekai ^{U19}	(Singapore)	13 February 2011 (age 15)	(Singapore) Lion City Sailors U15	2024	Dec 2026
94	Syed Amri ^{U19}	(Singapore)		(Singapore)	2026	Dec 2026
7	Ethan Joseph Varghese ^{AFA DC U19 & AFA DC U17}	(Singapore) (India)		(Singapore) Lion City Sailors U15	2024	Dec 2026
10	Joshua Chong Rong Kai ^{AFA DC U19 & AFA DC U17}	(Singapore)	17 September 2009 (age 17)	(Singapore) Lion City Sailors U15	2022	Dec 2026
11	Rohit Abraham ^{AFA DC U19 & AFA DC U17}	(Singapore)		(Singapore) Sailors Development U15	2023	Dec 2026
17	S Santosh ^{AFA DC U19}	(Singapore)		(Singapore) Sailors Development U15	2024	Dec 2026
47	Sean Luke Ong ^{AFA DC U19}	(Singapore)	15 January 2008 (age 18)	(Singapore) Lion City Sailors	2023	Dec 2026
50	Adryan Shah ^{AFA DC U19}	(Singapore)		(Singapore) Sailors Development U15	2024	Dec 2026
59	Aiman Zayani ^{AFA DC U19}	(Singapore)	28 February 2007 (age 19)	(Singapore) Lion City Sailors	2025	Dec 2026
60	Khalaf Abdul Jalil ^{AFA DC U19}	(Singapore)		(Singapore)	2026	Dec 2026
61	Nor Irfan Muhammad ^{AFA DC U19}	(Singapore)		(Singapore)	2026	Dec 2026
62	Raiyan Izdihar ^{AFA DC U19}	(Singapore)	9 March 2007 (age 19)	(Singapore) Balestier Khalsa U21	2025	Dec 2026
65	Brayden Khng ^{AFA DC U19}	(Singapore)	9 September 2007 (age 19)	(Singapore) Lion City Sailors	2025	Dec 2026
78	Xavier Tan Shan Yang ^{AFA DC U19}	(Singapore)	7 January 2008 (age 18)	(Singapore) Lion City Sailors	2023	Dec 2026
Forwards
87	Fikri Aqil Shalihan ^{U19}	(Singapore)		(Singapore) Lion City Sailors U15	2023	Dec 2026
88	Tan Zheng Rui ^{U19 & U17}	(Singapore)		(Singapore) Lion City Sailors U15	2023	Dec 2026
91	Adryan Alfian ^{U19}	(Singapore)		(Singapore) Lion City Sailors U15	2023	Dec 2026
93	Marcellus Kee Tng Chun ^{U19 & U17}	(Singapore)		(Singapore) Lion City Sailors U17	2024	Dec 2026
19	Theeraj Kumar Lalith Kumar ^{AFA DC U19 & AFA DC U17}	(Singapore)		(Singapore) Sailors Development U15	2024	Dec 2026
77	Jadon Quah Song Yee ^{AFA DC U19}	(Singapore)	20 April 2008 (age 18)	(Singapore) Lion City Sailors	2023	2027
	Ewan Seddon ^{U21}	(England) (Japan)	1 November 2008 (age 18)	(Singapore) Lion City Sailors U17	2024	2025
	Ahmad Luthfi Rusfatzilella ^{U21}	(Singapore)	15 August 2007 (age 19)	Singapore Sports School	2023	2025
Players loaned out
Players left during the season

=== U17 / AFA DC U17 squad ===
Squad No.	Name	Nationality	Date of Birth (Age)	Previous Club	Contract Since	Contract End
Goalkeeper
23	Shaqeel Iqbal Khan ^{U17 & U15}	(Singapore)		(Singapore) Lion City Sailors U14	2025	Dec 2026
45	Tyler Koh Zi Jie ^{U17}	(Singapore)		(Singapore) Lion City Sailors U15	2025	Dec 2026
	Dhruv Bafna ^{U17}	(India)	January 2009	(Singapore) Lion City Sailors U15	2022	2023
82	Arif Nazri ^{AFA DC U17}	(Singapore)		(Singapore) Sailors Development U15	2023	Dec 2026
Defenders
52	Ilhan Darwish Bahrurrazi ^{U17 & U15}	(Singapore)		(Singapore) Lion City Sailors U15	2025	Dec 2026
56	Diego Woodford Bennett ^{U17}	(Singapore) (England) (China)		(Singapore) Lion City Sailors U15	2023	Dec 2026
59	Aaron Ikechukwu Emuejeraye ^{U17 & U15}	(Singapore) (Nigeria)		(Singapore) Lion City Sailors U15	2024	Dec 2026
3	Emraan Ezaad ^{AFA DC U17}	(Singapore)		(Singapore) Sailors Development U15	2024	Dec 2026
5	Alfyan Faizal ^{AFA DC U17}	(Singapore)		(Singapore) Sailors Development U15	2024	Dec 2026
21	Kraft Noah Markus ^{AFA DC U17}	(Sweden)		(Singapore) Sailors Development U15	2025	Dec 2026
24	Irfan Hanafi ^{AFA DC U17}	(Singapore)		(Singapore)	2026	Dec 2026
44	Aadhavan Mohan ^{AFA DC U17}	(Singapore)		(Singapore) Lion City Sailors U15	2024	Dec 2026
52	Wan Kah Lok ^{AFA DC U17}	(Singapore)		(Singapore)	2026	Dec 2026
54	Lee Seul Hong ^{AFA DC U17}	(South Korea)		(Singapore) Sailors Development U14	2024	Dec 2026
	Yeo Boon Chin ^{AFA DC U17}	(Singapore)		(Singapore) Sailors Development U15	2024	2025
	Danial Fadli ^{AFA DC U17}	(Singapore)		(Singapore) Lion City Sailors U15	2024	2025
	Asya'ari Azhar ^{AFA DC U17}	(Singapore)		(Singapore) Lion City Sailors U15	2024	2025
	Rayyan Roslan ^{AFA DC U17}	(Singapore)		(Singapore) Lion City Sailors U15	2024	2025
	Leow Yi Leh ^{AFA DC U17}	(Singapore)		(Singapore)	2024	2025
	Haziq Yazid ^{AFA DC U17}	(Singapore)		Singapore Sports School	2024	2024
Midfielders
25	Hazeeq Hazmi ^{U17 & U15}	(Singapore)		(Singapore) Lion City Sailors U15	2025	Dec 2026
48	Hamzah Azri ^{U17}	(Singapore)		(Singapore) Lion City Sailors U14	2023	Dec 2026
49	Alexandre Charles Francois Paoli ^{U17}	(Italy)		(Singapore) Lion City Sailors U14	2023	Dec 2026
51	Zach Danish ^{U17}	(Singapore)		(Singapore) Lion City Sailors U15	2025	Dec 2026
53	Airell Aidil ^{U17 & U15}	(Singapore)		(Singapore) Lion City Sailors U15	2025	Dec 2026
55	Yang Seojun ^{U17}	(South Korea)		(Singapore)	2025	Dec 2026
61	Shahid Sudheer ^{U17}	(Singapore)		(Singapore) Lion City Sailors U15	2024	Dec 2026
62	Thabo Jan Fredrick Gorgen ^{U17}	(Germany) (Singapore)		(Singapore) Lion City Sailors U15	2024	Dec 2026
	Aydin Adfan ^{U17}	(India)		(Singapore) Lion City Sailors U15	2022	2025
	Aykel Akasyah ^{U17}	(Singapore)		(Singapore) Lion City Sailors U15	2024	2025
6	Delvan Bennet Kumar ^{AFA DC U17}	(Singapore)		(Singapore) Sailors Development U15	2023	Dec 2026
8	Bavesh Kumar ^{AFA DC U17}	(Singapore)		(Singapore) Sailors Development U15	2024	Dec 2026
12	Ben Weingarten ^{AFA DC U17}	(Netherlands)		(Singapore) Sailors Development U15	2024	Dec 2026
14	Hayden Toh Ying Le ^{AFA DC U17}	(Singapore)		(Singapore) Sailors Development U15	2023	Dec 2026
20	Ajai kadhir Maran ^{AFA DC U17}	(Singapore)		(Singapore)	2024	Dec 2026
27	Hadif Anaqi ^{AFA DC U17 & AFA DC U15}	(Singapore)		(Singapore)	2023	Dec 2026
87	Abdul Hafiz Abdul Faizal ^{AFA DC U17}	(Singapore)		(Singapore)	2026	Dec 2026
	Tan Kayne Jin ^{AFA DC U17}	(Singapore)		(Singapore) Lion City Sailors U15	2023	2025
	John Gipson Adriel ^{AFA DC U17}	(Singapore)		(Singapore) Sailors Development U15	2024	2025
	Caden Tan Li Chin ^{AFA DC U17}	(Singapore)		(Singapore) Sailors Development U15	2024	2025
	Jevarn Ong ^{AFA DC U17}	(Singapore)		(Singapore) Sailors Development U15	2024	2025
	Aqil Zulkarnain Supandy ^{AFA DC U17}	(Singapore)		(Singapore)	2023	2025
	Iliya Asano ^{U17}	(Singapore) (Belarus)	7 November 2010 (age 16)	(Singapore) Lion City Sailors U15	2022	2025
Strikers
47	Andrew Tham Sheng Yong ^{U17}	(Singapore)		(Singapore) Lion City Sailors U15	2023	Dec 2026
50	Hugo Bouvard ^{U17}	(France)		(Singapore) Lion City Sailors U14	2025	Dec 2026
58	Suren Roshan Mohan ^{U17}	(Singapore)		(Singapore) Lion City Sailors U15	2024	Dec 2026
6	Ryan Seak Zheng Wei ^{AFA DC U17}	(Singapore)		(Singapore) Sailors Development U15	2024	2025
9	Dylan Ng Jing Hang ^{AFA DC U17}	(Singapore)	17 September 2009 (age 17)	(Singapore) Lion City Sailors U15	2023	Dec 2026
15	Salvador Carreira Pereira ^{AFA DC U17}	(Singapore)		(Singapore) ActiveSG	2026	Dec 2026
16	Isaias Long Shi Kai ^{AFA DC U17}	(Singapore)		(Singapore)	2026	Dec 2026
15	Raul Eligio ^{AFA DC U17}	(Mexico)		(Singapore) Sailors Development U15	2024	2025
16	Danish Anaqi ^{AFA DC U17}	(Singapore)		(Singapore) Sailors Development U15	2023	2025
Players who left mid season
8	Xavier Tan Shan Yang ^{AFA DC U17}	(Singapore)		(Singapore) Sailors Development U15	2023	2025
9	Jadon Quah Song Yee ^{AFA DC U17}	(Singapore)	20 April 2008 (age 18)	(Singapore) Active Football SG	2023	2025
27	Jacas Tjhai Jun Heo	(Singapore)	5 January 2010 (age 16)	(Singapore) Lion City Sailors U15	2025	2026
31	Naqeeb Shawaluddin	(Singapore)	23 August 2010 (age 16)	(Singapore) Lion City Sailors U15	2025	2026
56	Danish Irfan Hazin ^{AFA DC U17}	(Singapore)		(Singapore)	2025	2025
77	Aufa Basyar ^{U17}	(Singapore)		(Singapore) Lion City Sailors U15	2023	2025
71	Luthfi Sufaiqish (G) ^{AFA DC U17}	(Singapore)		(Singapore) Lion City Sailors U17	2025	2025
2	Karlheinz Oma Koppe ^{AFA DC U17}	(Germany)		(Singapore) Sailors Development U15	2024	2025
3	Caleb Tan Kai Zhe (D) ^{AFA DC U17}	(Singapore)		(Singapore) Sailors Development U15	2022	2026
72	Ziqry Eizyanshah Azam (D) ^{AFA DC U17}	(Singapore)		(Singapore)	2024	2026
	Bryan Khng En (M) ^{AFA DC U17}	(Singapore)		(Singapore) Sailors Development U15	2023	2025
2	Dante James Pinto ^{U17}	(Singapore)	20 January 2010 (age 16)	(Singapore) Lion City Sailors U15	2023	2026
5	Issac Matthew Saw Tian Zhi ^{U17}	(Singapore)	2009	(Singapore) Lion City Sailors U15	2023	2026
20	Isyraf Khan Fhirhad ^{U17}	(Singapore)		(Singapore) Lion City Sailors U15	2024	2026
52	Adryan Putera ^{U17}	(Singapore)		(Singapore) Lion City Sailors U15	2024	2026
4	Shlok Ranadive ^{U17}	(Singapore)	10 June 2010 (age 16)	(Singapore)	2025	2025
6	Aiden Yang Zhekai ^{U17}	(Singapore)	13 February 2011 (age 15)	(Singapore) Lion City Sailors U15	2024	2025
7	Tan Yu Bin ^{U17}	(Singapore)		(Singapore) Lion City Sailors U15	2024	2025
9	Adryan Alfian ^{U17}	(Singapore)		(Singapore) Lion City Sailors U15	2023	2025
18	Fikri Aqil Shalihan ^{U17}	(Singapore)		(Singapore) Lion City Sailors U15	2023	2025
21	Marcellus Kee Tng Chun ^{U17}	(Singapore)		(Singapore) Lion City Sailors U15	2024	2025

=== U16/15 squad ===
Squad No.	Name	Nationality	Date of Birth (Age)	Previous Club	Contract Since	Contract End
Goalkeepers
22	Aniq Shawqi ^{U15}	(Singapore)		(Singapore)	2026	Dec 2026
43	Nazheef Saifun Naem ^{U15}	(Singapore)		(Singapore)	2026	Dec 2026
28	Ciaran Wen Ye Chew ^{U15}	(Singapore)	2009	(Singapore) Lion City Sailors U13	2023	2023
	Shahrul Ashari ^{U15}	(Singapore)	2010	(Singapore)	2023	2023
51	Colin Chew Wen Yu ^{AFA DC U15}	(Singapore)		(Singapore)	2024	Dec 2026
61	Adeeb Salleh ^{AFA DC U15}	(Singapore)		(Singapore)	2025	Dec 2026
Defenders
29	Ironn Goh Ming Kai ^{U15}	(Singapore)		(Singapore)	2026	Dec 2026
32	Aariq Arif ^{U15}	(Singapore)		(Singapore) Lion City Sailors U13	2024	Dec 2026
34	Ilman Hafidz Yazid ^{U15}	(Singapore)		(Singapore) Sailors Development U14	2025	Dec 2026
35	Louis Anjie Pierquin ^{U15}	(France)		(Singapore)	2026	Dec 2026
37	Nico Waddington Verlaine ^{U15}	(England)		(Singapore) Lion City Sailors U14	2024	Dec 2026
31	Matthew Wee ^{U15}	(Singapore)	2009	(Singapore) Lion City Sailors U13	2022	2023
59	Shahbil Fitri ^{U15}	(Singapore)		(Singapore)	2023	2023
63	Ong Ding Hao ^{U15}	(Singapore)		(Singapore)	2023	2023
77	Jevam Ong ^{U15}	(Singapore)		(Singapore)	2023	2023
	Bryan Chua Tian Ci ^{U15}	(Singapore)	17 September 2009 (age 17)	(Singapore) Lion City Sailors U13	2022	2023
23	Evan Kim Jun Han ^{AFA DC U15}	(Singapore)		(Singapore)	2025	Dec 2026
34	Hugo Joanny ^{AFA DC U15}	(Singapore)		(Singapore)	2023	Dec 2026
35	Das Raj Takeshi ^{AFA DC U15}	(India)		(Singapore)	2025	Dec 2026
41	Caleb Connor Bowman ^{AFA DC U15}	(Republic of Ireland)		(Singapore)	2025	Dec 2026
43	Mierza Arif ^{AFA DC U15}	(Singapore)		(Singapore)	2026	Dec 2026
56	Josh Lim Jun Rui ^{AFA DC U15}	(Singapore)		(Singapore)		Dec 2026
66	Phan Anh Tu ^{AFA DC U15}	(Vietnam)		(Singapore)		Dec 2026
68	Reinhart Oma Koppe ^{AFA DC U15}	(Singapore) (Germany)		(Singapore)	2024	Dec 2026
88	Suwa Issei ^{AFA DC U15}	(Japan)		(Singapore)		Dec 2026
2	Tristan Lloyd Thomas ^{AFA DC U15}	(England)		(Singapore)	2025	2025
12	Evan Liu Chengru ^{AFA DC U15}	(Singapore)		(Singapore)	2025	2025
14	Syafiqry Rizqy Rafi ^{AFA DC U15}	(Singapore)		(Singapore)	2025	2025
14	Ryan Ameer ^{AFA DC U15}	(Singapore)		(Singapore)	2025	2025
19	Aaryan Om Gokaldas ^{AFA DC U15}	(Singapore)		(Singapore)	2025	2025
21	Nail Taib ^{AFA DC U15}	(Singapore)		(Singapore)	2025	2025
	Riz Ilhan Ashriq ^{AFA DC U15}	(Singapore)		(Singapore)	2023	2024
Midfielders
42	Foo Yong Ze ^{U15}	(Singapore)		(Singapore)	2023	2023
24	Tengku Rayyan Rizqin ^{U15}	(Singapore)		(Singapore) Sailors Development U14	2025	Dec 2026
26	Khaliesh Wafi ^{U15 & U13}	(Singapore)		(Singapore)	2026	Dec 2026
28	Aniq Aqish Alfee ^{U15 & U14 & U13}	(Singapore)		(Singapore) Sailors Development U13	2025	Dec 2026
30	Fariel Nabil ^{U15}	(Singapore)		(Singapore)	2026	Dec 2026
31	Ilhan Nawfal Nazeer ^{U15 & U14 & U13}	(Singapore)		(Singapore) Lion City Sailors U13	2024	Dec 2026
33	Zach Al-Kish ^{U15}	(Singapore)		(Singapore)	2026	Dec 2026
36	Raphael Courant ^{U15 & U13}	(France)		(Singapore) Lion City Sailors U14	2025	Dec 2026
39	Ryan Qushairy ^{U15}	(Singapore)		(Singapore)	2026	Dec 2026
26	Tobias Fang Yile ^{AFA DC U15}	(Singapore)		(Singapore)	2024	Dec 2026
32	Aaron Ariq Herman ^{AFA DC U15}	(Singapore)		(Singapore)	2024	Dec 2026
36	Low Kai Jing ^{AFA DC U15}	(Singapore)		(Singapore) Sailors Development U13	2025	Dec 2026
38	Lewis Sun Hongwen ^{AFA DC U15}	(Singapore)		(Singapore)		Dec 2026
49	Haikel Noreffendy ^{AFA DC U15}	(Singapore)		(Singapore)	2023	Dec 2026
62	James Hoi Kit Chooi ^{AFA DC U15}	(Singapore)		(Singapore)		Dec 2026
65	Xander Tan Yang Xuan ^{AFA DC U15}	(Singapore)		(Singapore)		Dec 2026
31	Ethan Chan Wing Fung ^{AFA DC U15}	(Singapore)		(Singapore)	2024	2025
34	Hady Masjuri ^{AFA DC U15}	(Singapore)		(Singapore)	2024	2025
36	Mirza Nathirsha Shafir ^{AFA DC U15}	(Singapore)		(Singapore)	2024	2025
37	Kyle Wong Joon Hei ^{AFA DC U15}	(Singapore)		(Singapore)	2024	2025
51	Raihan Rashid ^{AFA DC U15}	(Singapore)		(Singapore)	2024	2025
58	Owl Zhe Han Jairus ^{AFA DC U16}	(Singapore)		(Singapore)	2024	2024
81	Connor John Forsyth ^{AFA DC U16}	(Argentina)			2023	2023
Strikers
	Reyes Chang Yu Fung ^{U15}	(Singapore)	15 January 2010 (age 16)	(Singapore)	2023	2023
27	Ahyan Abdul Rahim ^{U15 & U13}	(Singapore)		(Singapore) Sailors Development U14	2025	Dec 2026
33	Lucas Tok Yan Kit ^{AFA DC U15}	(Singapore)		(Singapore) Lion City Sailors U13	2023	Dec 2026
38	Khalid Saifullah ^{U15 & U13}	(Singapore)		(Singapore) Lion City Sailors U14	2026	Dec 2026
39	Nidhish Vijayakumar ^{AFA DC U15}	(Singapore)		(Singapore)	2026	Dec 2026
40	Thierry Amyza ^{AFA DC U15}	(France)		(Singapore)	2023	Dec 2026
42	Lucas Ling Zi Xuan ^{AFA DC U15}	(Singapore)		(Singapore) Balestier Khalsa U13	2025	Dec 2026
47	Aarodh S.d. Sai ^{AFA DC U15}	(Singapore)		(Singapore)	2026	Dec 2026
9	Yu Kichiji ^{AFA DC U15}	(Japan)	6 August 2010 (age 16)	(Singapore) Sailors Development U13	2023	2025
11	Hugo Kai Rawlings ^{AFA DC U15}	(England)		(Singapore)	2025	2025
27	Khilfy Zulfael ^{AFA DC U15}	(Singapore)		(Singapore) Lion City Sailors U13	2022	2025
59	Creak Jem Louis Mclaren ^{AFA DC U15}	(Singapore)		(Singapore)	2023	2025
64	Ammar Farouk ^{AFA DC U15}	(Singapore)		(Singapore)	2023	2025
87	Lucas Jerome Augustin ^{AFA DC U15}	(Singapore)		(Singapore)	2023	2025
32	Nguyen Yaqine Nathan Sen ^{AFA DC U16}	(Singapore) (Vietnam)		(Singapore)	2024	2024
Players who left the team
38	Kaidan Rune Ferrell (G) ^{U15}	(Singapore)	22 September 2008 (age 18)	(Singapore) Lion City Sailors U13	2023	2023
30	Kellan Woolfe ^{U15}	(United States) (Singapore)	2009	(Singapore) Lion City Sailors U13	2022	2023
22	Yang Seojun ^{U15}	(South Korea)		(Singapore)	2025	2025
66	Danish Haikal (M) ^{U15}	(Singapore)		(Singapore)	2023	2023
32	Erfan Nurhan Fazly ^{AFA DC U16}	(Singapore)		(Singapore) Albirex Niigata (S) U15	2024	2024
4	Isaias Long ^{AFA DC U15}	(Singapore)		(Singapore)	2025	2025
7	Benicio Khoo Yong Wu ^{AFA DC U15}	(Singapore)	6 August 2010 (age 16)	(Singapore) Sailors Development U13	2023	2025
20	Kraft Noah Markus ^{AFA DC U15}	(Sweden)		(Singapore)	2025	2025
29	Lee Seul Hong ^{AFA DC U15}	(South Korea)		(Singapore) Sailors Development U14	2024	2025
33	Emraan Ezaad ^{AFA DC U15}	(Singapore)		(Singapore)	2024	2025
38	Ben Weingarten ^{AFA DC U15}	(Netherlands)		(Singapore)	2024	2025
52	Karlheinz Oma Koppe ^{AFA DC U15}	(Germany)	14 July 2008 (age 18)	(Singapore) Sailors Development U13	2024	2025
74	Hayden Toh Ying Le ^{AFA DC U15}	(Singapore)		(Singapore)	2023	2025
47	Miro Valio Jai ^{AFA DC U15}	(Canada)		(Singapore)	2024	2025
49	S Santosh ^{AFA DC U15}	(Singapore)		(Singapore)	2024	2025
82	Hadif Anaqi ^{AFA DC U15}	(Singapore)		(Singapore)	2023	2025

=== U14/13 squad ===
Squad No.	Name	Nationality	Date of Birth (Age)	Previous Club	Contract Since	Contract End
Goalkeepers
52	Wafi Khaliesh Amri ^{U14}	(Singapore)		(Singapore) Lion City Sailors U12	2024	2025
Defenders
2	Shaqeel Bilal Khan ^{U13}	(Singapore)		(Singapore)	2026	Dec 2026
3	Julian Mark Scully ^{U13}	(Singapore)		(Singapore) Lion City Sailors U12	2025	Dec 2026
6	Farish Nabil Fadzeel ^{U14 & U13}	(Singapore)		(Singapore) Sailors Development U12	2025	Dec 2026
8	Seth Lee Ka Weng ^{U13}	(Singapore)		(Singapore) Lion City Sailors U12	2025	Dec 2026
24	Ryler Pang ^{U13 & U11}	(Singapore)		(Singapore)	2026	Dec 2026
12	Afshan Rayn ^{AFA DC U13}	(Singapore)		(Singapore)	2026	Dec 2026
30	Tega Emuejeraye ^{U14}	(Singapore) (Nigeria)		(Singapore) Lion City Sailors U13	2024	2025
96	Xavier Pua ^{AFA DC U14}	(Singapore)		(Singapore) Sailors Development U13	2025	2025
97	Victor Hsu ^{AFA DC U14}	(Singapore)		(Singapore) Sailors Development U13	2025	2025
	Saif Aqasha Faizal ^{U14}	(Singapore)		(Singapore)	2024	2024
	Malikh Khairil ^{U13}	(Singapore)		(Singapore)	2023	2023
Midfielders
10	Daito Ono ^{U13}	(Japan)		(Singapore) Lion City Sailors U12	2025	Dec 2026
11	Dameer Harith Jefrey ^{U13}	(Singapore)		(Singapore) Lion City Sailors U12	2025	Dec 2026
13	Ezra Mykhayl ^{U13}	(Singapore)		(Singapore)	2026	Dec 2026
21	Adrian Adam Hadi ^{U13}	(Singapore)		(Singapore) Lion City Sailors U12	2025	Dec 2026
6	Bennett Zink ^{AFA DC U13}	(Singapore)		(Singapore)	2026	Dec 2026
17	Tetje Hinkelmann ^{AFA DC U13}	(Singapore)		(Singapore)	2026	Dec 2026
18	Lucas Daniel Morrow ^{AFA DC U13}	(Singapore)		(Singapore)	2026	Dec 2026
25	Zaydan Zailani ^{AFA DC U13}	(Singapore)		(Singapore)	2026	Dec 2026
29	Rayyan Ridwan ^{AFA DC U13}	(Singapore)		(Singapore)	2026	Dec 2026
30	Arman Ziqry ^{AFA DC U13}	(Singapore)		(Singapore)	2026	Dec 2026
76	Ayden Anarqy Kamarulzaman ^{AFA DC U14}	(Singapore)		(Singapore) Sailors Development U13	2025	2025
77	Zenius Kong Zhun Ming ^{AFA DC U14}	(Singapore)		(Singapore)	2025	2025
78	Izz Qaiser Colorado ^{AFA DC U14}	(Singapore)		(Singapore)	2025	2025
86	Raoul Lee-Harsha ^{AFA DC U14}	(Singapore)		(Singapore) Sailors Development U13	2025	2025
89	Daryl Seak Yi Wei ^{AFA DC U14}	(Singapore)		(Singapore) Sailors Development U13	2025	2025
90	Nithipat Puranamaneewiwat ^{AFA DC U14}	(Thailand)		(Singapore) Sailors Development U13	2025	2025
93	Sho Tsukamoto ^{AFA DC U14}	(Japan)		(Singapore) Sailors Development U13	2025	2025
94	Micah Erfan Samimi ^{AFA DC U14}	(Singapore)		(Singapore) Sailors Development U13	2025	2025
	Chae Tjer ^{AFA DC}	(Singapore)		(Singapore)	2023	2023
	Park Suh-ho ^{AFA DC U13}	(South Korea)		(Singapore) Sailors Development U12	2025	2025
	Tan Shaun Jin ^{AFA DC U13}	(Singapore)		(Singapore) Sailors Development U12	2025	2025
Strikers
9	Arjun Hooda ^{U13}	(Singapore)		(Singapore)	2026	Dec 2026
24	Tengku Rayyan Rizqin ^{U14 & U13}	(Singapore)		(Singapore) Sailors Development U13	2025	Dec 2026
27	Ahyan Abdul Rahim ^{U14 & U13}	(Singapore)		(Singapore) Sailors Development U13	2025	Dec 2026
31	Takumi Watanabe ^{AFA DC U13}	(Japan)		(Singapore)	2026	Dec 2026
38	Koki Yanamoto ^{U14}	(Japan)		(Singapore) Sailors Development U13	2025	2025
51	Ciao Xandro Pancho Catubag ^{U13}	(Singapore)		(Singapore) Sailors Development U13	2025	2025
79	Eir'man Aqel Juraimi ^{AFA DC U14}	(Singapore)		(Singapore) Sailors Development U13	2025	2025
81	Luis Quintanilla Carrillo ^{AFA DC U14}	(Colombia)		(Singapore) Sailors Development U13	2025	2025
84	Yuki Takahashi ^{AFA DC U14}	(Japan)		(Singapore) Sailors Development U13	2025	2025
85	Alexander Georg Schneeberger ^{AFA DC U14}	(Germany)		(Singapore) Sailors Development U13	2025	2025
87	Chew Shin Kai ^{AFA DC U14}	(Singapore)		(Singapore) Sailors Development U13	2025	2025
88	Mika Asidq Fariheen ^{AFA DC U14}	(Singapore)		(Singapore) Sailors Development U13	2025	2025
91	Rifqi Hanif Hidzat ^{AFA DC U14}	(Singapore)		(Singapore) Sailors Development U13	2025	2025
9	Royce Luke Kai Yuen ^{AFA DC U13}	(Singapore)		(Singapore) Sailors Development U12	2025	2025
11	Ilmal Yaqin Fadzuhasny ^{AFA DC U13}	(Singapore)		(Singapore)	2024	2025
25	Toshiharu Anzai ^{AFA DC U13}	(Japan)		(Singapore) Lion City Sailors U13	2025	2025
35	Hamzah Azri ^{U14}	(Singapore)		(Singapore) Lion City Sailors U13	2023	2025
78	Haruji Umeda ^{AFA DC U13}	(Japan)		(Singapore)	2024	2025
19	Malikh Khairil ^{AFA DC U13}	(Singapore)		(Singapore)	2024	2024
94	Afiq Danial ^{AFA DC U13}	(Singapore)		(Singapore) Geylang International U13	2024	2024
10	Adib Arfah ^{AFA DC U14}	(Singapore)		(Singapore) Sailors Development Centre	2023	2024
Players who left
26	Bryceton Pang ^{U14}	(Singapore)		(Singapore) Lion City Sailors U13	2024	2025
33	Joshua Ng ^{U14}	(Singapore)		(Singapore) Lion City Sailors U13	2023	2025
34	Alexandre Paoli ^{U14}	(Italy)		(Singapore) Lion City Sailors U13	2023	2025
43	Tyler Koh Zi Jie ^{U14}	(Singapore)		(Singapore) Sailors Development U13	2025	2025
46	Hugo Bouvard ^{U14}	(France)		(Singapore) Sailors Development U13	2025	2025
46	Ironn Goh Ming Kai ^{U14}	(Singapore)		(Singapore) Sailors Development U13	2025	2025
50	Raphael Courant ^{U14}	(France)		(Singapore) Sailors Development U13	2025	2026
	Aaron Ikechukwu Emuejeraye ^{U14}	(Singapore) (Nigeria)		(Singapore) Lion City Sailors U13	2024	2026
52	Nico Verlaine Waddington ^{U14}	(England)		(Singapore) Lion City Sailors U13	2024	2025
57	Aariq Arif ^{U14}	(Singapore)		(Singapore) Lion City Sailors U13	2024	2025

=== U12 squad ===
Squad No.	Name	Nationality	Date of Birth (Age)	Previous Club	Contract Since	Contract End
Goalkeepers
Defenders
2	Eryandez Khairil ^{U12}	(Singapore)		(Singapore)	2025	2025
3	Tengku A'dhyean Rehan ^{U12}	(Singapore)		(Singapore)	2025	2025
4	Riyadh Alfayyadh ^{U12}	(Singapore)		(Singapore) Lion City Sailors U12	2025	2025
26	Muh Erza Mykhayl ^{U12}	(Singapore)		(Singapore)	2025	2025
27	Muh Jazuli Jailani ^{U12}	(Singapore)		(Singapore)	2025	2025
35	Jakob Anton Rui Kang Sandgren ^{U12}	(Singapore) (Denmark)		(Singapore)	2025	Dec 2026
38	Kyle Michael Kennedy ^{U12}	(Singapore)		(Singapore)	2025	Dec 2026
5	Aufa Assyauqie Shalihan ^{AFA DC U12}	(Singapore)		(Singapore)	2025	2025
12	James Chen Boxuan ^{AFA DC U12}	(Singapore)		(Singapore)	2025	2025
14	Carmelina Elizabeth Peck ^{AFA DC U12}	(Singapore)		(Singapore)	2025	2025
15	Lucas Guang Loong Chin ^{AFA DC U12}	(Singapore)		(Singapore)	2025	2025
24	Farie Rafael ^{AFA DC U12}	(Singapore)		(Singapore)	2025	2025
34	Anand Yoji Das ^{AFA DC U12}	(Singapore)		(Singapore)	2025	2025
Midfielders
37	Maximus Pattarapost Philippi ^{U12}	(France) (Thailand)		(Singapore)	2025	Dec 2026
40	Emile Sihan Cadoux ^{U12}	(France)		(Singapore)	2025	Dec 2026
29	Christian Kimi Raudzsus ^{U12}	(Germany)		(Singapore)	2024	2025
30	Dzimar Jazil Hydir ^{U12}	(Singapore)		(Singapore)	2025	2025
32	Noah Isaac Augustin ^{U12}	(Singapore)		(Singapore)	2025	2025
89	Saffi Gavrie Sofiyan ^{U12}	(Singapore)		(Singapore)	2025	2025
8	Adam Armaan Rahim ^{AFA DC U12}	(Singapore)		(Singapore) Sailors Development U11	2025	Dec 2026
10	Mikito Takamatsu ^{AFA DC U12}	(Japan)		(Singapore)	2025	2025
16	Francisco Isaiah Lee Hong Heng ^{AFA DC U12}	(Singapore)		(Singapore) Sailors Development U11	2025	Dec 2026
20	Danish Qushairy ^{AFA DC U12}	(Singapore)		(Singapore) Sailors Development U11	2025	Dec 2026
44	Ibraheem Badrul Hisham ^{AFA DC U12}	(Sweden)		(Singapore)	2025	2025
	Lucas Chin ^{U12}	(Sweden)		(Singapore)	2024	2024
Forwards
36	Denzel Fan Tianwei ^{U12}	(Singapore)		(Singapore)	2026	Dec 2026
39	Nur Hana Raiqa ^{U12}	(Singapore)		(Singapore)	2025	Dec 2026
43	Nathan Heng Yichuan ^{U12}	(Singapore)		(Singapore)	2025	Dec 2026
44	Hugo Friberg ^{U12}	(Sweden)		(Singapore)	2026	Dec 2026
12	Thomas Walker ^{U12}	(England)		(Singapore)	2025	2025
18	Aariz Ilhan ^{U12}	(Sweden)		(Singapore)	2025	2025
19	Chua Meng Han Gideon ^{U12}	(Sweden)		(Singapore)	2025	2025
7	Max James Robinson ^{AFA DC U12}	(Australia)		(Singapore)	2025	2025
9	Takafumi Mori ^{AFA DC U12}	(Japan)		(Singapore)	2025	Dec 2026
11	Ang Yong Xiang ^{AFA DC U12}	(Singapore)		(Singapore)	2025	2025
	Ilhan Nawfal Nazeer ^{AFA DC U12}	(Singapore)		(Singapore)	2024	2025
	Dan Fishman ^{AFA DC U12}	(Germany)		(Singapore)	2024	2024
Players who left
6	Farish Nabil Fadzeel ^{U12}	(Singapore)		(Singapore) Sailors DC U11	2025	2025
8	Seth Lee Ka Weng ^{U12}	(Singapore)		(Singapore) Lion City Sailors U11	2025	2025
21	Daito Ono ^{U12}	(Japan)		(Singapore)	2025	2025
23	Julian Scully ^{U12}	(Singapore)		(Singapore)	2025	2025
25	Arjun Hooda ^{U12}	(Singapore)		(Singapore)	2025	2025
31	Dameer Harith Jefrey ^{U12}	(Singapore)		(Singapore)	2025	2025
63	Adrian Adam Hadi ^{U12}	(Singapore)		(Singapore) Lion City Sailors U11	2025	2025

== Kits ==
Kits using Adidas's trademark
Home	Away	Goalkeeper Home ^{1}	Goalkeeper Away ^{2}

== Staff ==
The following list displays the coaching and administrative staff of Lion City Sailors FC:

Management Team

Position	Name
Chairman	(Singapore) (China) Forrest Li
CEO	(Singapore) Bruce Liang
Sporting Director	(Serbia) Luka Lalić
Technical Director	(Serbia) Luka Lalić
General Manager	(Singapore) Tan Li Yu
Head of Recruitment	(Croatia) Igor Cerina

First Team

Position	Name
Team Manager (SPL)	(Vietnam) Hương Trần
Team Manager (WPL)	(Singapore) Jenny Tan
Head Women Program	(Singapore) Yeong Sheau Shyan (Note: Appointed as coach of U16 Girls National Team for Lion City Cup)
Head Coach	(Spain) Jesús Casas (till 1 Sept 26) (Spain) Varo Moreno (till 15 Sept 26) (England) Mark Jackson
Head Coach (Women)	(Singapore) Daniel Ong
Assistant Coach	(Spain) Alejandro Varela (till 1 Sept 26) (Spain) Salva Romero (till 1 Sept 26) (Wales) Cameron Toshack (Australia) (Brazil) Lucas Vileva
Assistant Coach (Women)	(Singapore) Izz Haziq Izan
Goalkeeping Coach	(Spain) David Valle (till 1 Sept 26) (Slovenia) Kris Štergulc
Goalkeeping Coach (Women)	(Singapore) Joey Sim
Fitness Coach	(Spain) Manuel Salado (till 1 Sept 26)
Head Strength & Conditioning (S&C) Coach	(Portugal) Miguel Bragança
Rehabilitation Coach	(Netherlands) Niels Van Sundert
Individual Coach	(Portugal) Rodrigo Costa
Performance Coach	(Singapore) He Qi Xiang
Sports Scientist	(Netherlands) Mike Kerklaan (Portugal) André Gonçalves Mendes
Video Analyst	(Spain) Varo Moreno
Match Analyst	(Singapore) Daniel Lau
Head of Logistics	(Singapore) Zahir Taufeek
Sports Cordinator	(Singapore) Masrezal Bin Mashuri

SPL2 Team

Team Manager (SPL2)	(Singapore) William Phang
Head Coach	(Portugal) Bruno Jeremias
Asst Coach	(Portugal) Dinando
Goalkeeping Coach	(Singapore) Chua Lye Heng
Performance Coach (Under-21)	(Brazil) Vital Ribeiro Damasceno
Individual Coach (Under-21)	(Portugal) Dinando
Sports Scientist (Under-21)	(Spain) Santiago Izquierdo
Match Analyst (Under-21)	(Singapore) Gautam Selvamany
Video Analyst (Under-21)	(Spain) Jesus Remacha

Academy

Position	Name
Head of Academy	(Portugal) Nuno Pereira
Head of DC Team & Academy Coordinator	(Singapore) Ashraf Ariffin (Note: Appointed as coach of U16 Boys National Team for Lion City Cup)
Head Coach (Mattar Sailors)	(Singapore) Jasni Hatta
Under-17 Head Coach	(Scotland) (Iraq) Mustafa Al-Saffar
Under-17 Asst. Coach	(Portugal) Francisco Couto
Under-15 Head Coach	(Netherlands) Wiebe de Haan
Under-15 Asst. Coach	(Singapore) Hamqaamal Shah
Under-14 Head Coach	(Singapore) Khairil Asyraf
Under-13 Head Coach	(Portugal) Francisco Couto
Under-12 Head Coach	(Singapore) Hamqaamal Shah
Under-11 Head Coach	(Singapore) Kevin Tan
Under-10 Head Coach	(Singapore) (Italy) Christian Chiang Moroni
Head of Youth Goalkeeper Coach	(Singapore) Shahril Jantan
Goalkeeping Coach (U17)	(Singapore) Yeo Jun Guang
Goalkeeping Coach (U15)	(Estonia) Artur Lohmus
Goalkeeping Coach (U13)	(Singapore) Fadly Tamiri
Performance Coach (U17)	(Brazil) Leonardo Marinheiro
Performance Coach (U15)	(Portugal) Vitor Ribeiro Filipe
Performance Coach (U13)	
Individual Coach (U17) & Talent Coordinator	(Portugal) Diogo Lopes
Individual Coach (U15)	
Individual Coach (U13)	(Portugal) Rui Duro
S&C Coach (U17)	
S&C Coach (U15)	(Singapore) Gabriel Low
S&C Coach (U13)	(Singapore) Leslie Chen
Sports Scientist (U17)	(Estonia) Tarmo Tikk
Sports Scientist (U15)	(Portugal) João Crespo
Sports Trainer	(Singapore) Amanda Cheong
Video Analyst (Development)	(Singapore) Raihan Ismail
Video Analyst (U17)	(Singapore) Zachary Wu
Match Analyst (U17)	
Rehabilitation Coach (U17)	(Portugal) João Crespo
Video Analyst (U15)	(Singapore) Poh Kai Ern
Nutritionist	(Netherlands) Denise Van Ewijk
Administrative Manager	(Singapore) Clement Choong
Logistics Manager	(Malaysia) Jackson Goh
Multimedia Manager	(Singapore) Adrian Tan
International Relations	(Singapore) Calum Lim
Kitman	(Singapore) Uncle John

== Transfers ==
=== In ===
Pre-season

Date	Position	Player	Transferred from	Ref
First Team
1 June 2026	MF	(Singapore) Jonan Tan	(Portugal) FC Vizela U23 (P2)	End of loan (Note: Asis will primarily train and play with Estrela’s B Team, while also turning out for the club’s Under-23 side.)
1 June 2026	MF	(Singapore) Nur Muhammad Asis	(Portugal) FC Vizela U23 (P2)	End of loan
30 June 2026	GK	(Singapore) Zharfan Rohaizad	(Singapore) Hougang United	End of loan
30 June 2026	GK	(Singapore) Izwan Mahbud	(Singapore) Young Lions	End of loan
30 June 2026	DF	(Brazil) Enrico Walmrath Silveira	(Singapore) Young Lions	End of loan
30 June 2026	DF	(Singapore) Zulqarnaen Suzliman	(Singapore) FC Jurong	End of loan
30 June 2026	DF	(Singapore) Aniq Raushan	(Singapore) Balestier Khalsa	End of loan
30 June 2026	MF	(Singapore) Danie Hafiy	(Singapore) Geylang International	End of loan
30 June 2026	MF	(Republic of Ireland) (Japan) Joshua Little	(Singapore) Young Lions	End of loan
30 June 2026	FW	(Singapore) (England) Ilyasin Zayan	(Singapore) Balestier Khalsa	End of loan
30 June 2026	FW	(Singapore) (Nigeria) Abdul Rasaq	(Singapore) FC Jurong	End of loan
30 June 2026	FW	(Singapore) Izrafil Yusof	(Singapore) Tanjong Pagar United	End of loan
30 June 2026	FW	(England) Harry Spence	(Singapore) Young Lions	End of loan
1 July 2026	DF	(Lithuania) Algirdas Karlonas	(Singapore) Hougang United	Free
1 July 2026	MF	(Australia) (Singapore) Hugh Alexander Lobsey	(Singapore) Balestier Khalsa	Free
1 July 2026	MF	(India) Aaditya Aprameya	(Singapore) Tampines Rovers	Free
1 July 2026	FW	(Chinese Taipei) Jasper Chen Hong-An	(Singapore) Tampines Rovers	Free
1 July 2026	FW	(Singapore) Farhan Zulkifli	(Singapore) Hougang United	Undisclosed; 2 years contract till Jun-28
8 July 2026	DF	(Singapore) (Wales) Ryhan Stewart	(Thailand) Kanchanaburi Power	Free; 3 years contract till Jun-29
13 July 2026	FW	(Singapore) Glenn Kweh	(Singapore) Tampines Rovers	Free; 2 years contract till Jun-28
16 July 2026	DF	(Brazil) Hugo Gomes	(Vietnam) Cong An Hanoi	Free; 2 years contract till Jun-28
20 July 2026	FW	(Singapore) (South Africa) Ilhan Fandi	(Thailand) BG Pathum United	Undisclosed; 2 years contract till Jun-28
23 July 2026	DF	(Georgia (country)) (Portugal) Jorge Karseladze	(Portugal) Rio Ave	Undisclosed; 2 years contract till Jun-28
28 July 2026	FW	(Guadeloupe) (France) Matthias Phaëton	(Bulgaria) CSKA Sofia	Undisclosed (Note: Fee rumored to be $500k.); 3 years contract till Jun-29
31 July 2026	FW	(Croatia) Antonio Mance	(Qatar) Umm Salal	Undisclosed; 2 years contract till Jun-28
4 August 2026	MF	(France) (Italy) Giovanni Haag	(Germany) Fortuna Düsseldorf	Undisclosed; 2 years contract till Jun-28
6 August 2026	FW	(Netherlands) (Nigeria) Bobby Adekanye	(Turkey) Manisa	Undisclosed; 2 years contract till Jun-28
13 August 2026	GK	(Brazil) (Spain) Victor Aznar	(Spain) Cádiz	Undisclosed (Note: Fee rumored to be US$250k.); 3 years contract till Jun-29
U23
30 June 2026	GK	(Singapore) (Malaysia) Ashman Saravanan	(Singapore) Young Lions	End of loan
30 June 2026	GK	(Singapore) Ainun Nuha Ilyasir	(Singapore) Young Lions	End of loan
30 June 2026	DF	(Singapore) Iliya Naufal	(Singapore) Young Lions	End of loan
30 June 2026	DF	(Singapore) Ryan Vishal	(Singapore) Young Lions	End of loan
30 June 2026	MF	(Portugal) (France) Tiago Martins	(Singapore) Balestier Khalsa	End of loan
30 June 2026	DF	(Singapore) Ilhan Rizqullah	(Singapore) Young Lions	End of loan
30 June 2026	MF	(Singapore) Sarrvin Raj	(Singapore) Young Lions	End of loan
30 June 2026	FW	(Singapore) Tyler Matthew Ho Zheng Yu	(Singapore) Young Lions	End of loan
1 July 2026	GK	(Singapore) Issac Goh Jun Yang	(Singapore) SAFSA	End of NS
1 July 2026	DF	(Singapore) Kieran Aryan Azhari	(Singapore) SAFSA	End of NS
1 July 2026	DF	(Singapore) Aniq Tiryaq	(Singapore) SAFSA	End of NS
1 July 2026	DF	(Singapore) Aqil Khusni	(Singapore) SAFSA	End of NS
1 July 2026	MF	(Singapore) Yazid Rais	(Singapore) SAFSA	End of NS
31 August 2026	FW	(Singapore) (Iran) (England) Kian Ghadessy	(Singapore) SAFSA	End of NS

=== Out ===
Preseason

Date	Position	Player	Transferred To	Ref
First Team
25 May 2026	MF	(Singapore) Hafiz Nor	(Singapore) Young Lions	Free
26 May 2026	MF	(Portugal) Rui Pires	(Cambodia) PKR Svay Rieng	Free
27 May 2026	DF	(Singapore) Christopher van Huizen	(Singapore) FC Jurong	Free
28 May 2026	FW	(Serbia) Luka Adžić	(Serbia) Železničar Pančevo	Free
28 May 2026	MF	(Brazil) Lucas Agueiro	(Hong Kong) KC Southern	Free
29 May 2026	DF	(Singapore) Akram Azman	(Singapore) FC Jurong	Free
30 May 2026	GK	(Singapore) Izwan Mahbud	(Singapore) Young Lions	Free
30 May 2026	GK	(Singapore) Zharfan Rohaizad	(Singapore) Tampines Rovers	Free
30 May 2026	DF	(Singapore) Zulqarnaen Suzliman	(Singapore) Hougang United	Free
26 June 2026	FW	(Brazil) Anderson Lopes	(Japan) Vissel Kobe	Undisclosed
30 June 2026	DF	(Singapore) Akmal Azman	(Singapore)	Free
30 June 2026	DF	(Singapore) Aniq Raushan	(Singapore)	Free
30 June 2026	DF	(Singapore) Danish Irfan	(Singapore)	Free
30 June 2026	MF	(Republic of Ireland) (Japan) Joshua Little	(Singapore)	Free
30 June 2026	MF	(Singapore) Danie Hafiy	(Singapore) Balestier Khalsa	Free
30 June 2026	FW	(Singapore) Ilyasin Zayan	(Singapore) Balestier Khalsa	Free
30 June 2026	FW	(Singapore) Naufal Azman	(Singapore)	Free
2 July 2026	DF	(Singapore) Kieran Aryan Azhari	(Singapore)	Free
17 July 2026	MF	(Singapore) Khairin Nadim	(Singapore) Hougang United	Season loan
26 July 2026	GK	(Slovenia) Benjamin Žerak	(Singapore) Young Lions	Season loan
5 August 2026	FW	(England) Harry Spence	(United Arab Emirates) Rimal Al-Sahra SC	Free
12 August 2026	DF	(Singapore) Marcus Mosses	(Singapore) Tanjong Pagar United	Free
14 August 2026	MF	(Singapore) Jonan Tan	(Croatia) NK Dugopolje (C2)	Season loan
U23
30 June 2026	GK	(Singapore) Nor Aqmar Shamil	(Singapore)	Free
30 June 2026	DF	(Brazil) Enrico Walmrath Silveira	(Singapore)	Free
30 June 2026	DF	(Singapore) Caleb Tan Kai Zhe	(Singapore)	Free
30 June 2026	MF	(Nepal) (Singapore) Rijan Rai	(Singapore)	Free
30 June 2026	MF	(Singapore) Ryan Lim Zong Han	(Singapore)	Free
30 June 2026	FW	(Singapore) Syafiq Asaraf	(Singapore)	Free
1 July 2026	GK	(Singapore) Efan Qiszman	(Singapore) Balestier Khalsa	Free
1 July 2026	GK	(Singapore) (Malaysia) Ashman Saravanan	(Singapore) Young Lions	Season loan
1 July 2026	GK	(Singapore) Ainun Nuha Ilyasir	(Singapore) Young Lions	Season loan
1 July 2026	DF	(Singapore) Iliya Naufal	(Singapore) Young Lions	Season loan
1 July 2026	DF	(Singapore) Ryan Vishal	(Singapore) Young Lions	Season loan
1 July 2026	DF	(Singapore) Aaryan Fikri	(Singapore) Balestier Khalsa	Free
1 July 2026	DF	(Singapore) Ikmal Hazlan	(Singapore) Balestier Khalsa	Free
1 July 2026	MF	(Portugal) (France) Tiago Martins	(Czech Republic) Bzenec-Vracov	Free
1 July 2026	MF	(Singapore) Izz Anaqi	(Singapore) FC Jurong	Free
1 July 2026	FW	(Singapore) Tyler Matthew Ho Zheng Yu	(Singapore) FC Jurong	Free
1 July 2026	FW	(Singapore) Sarrvin Raj	(Singapore) Young Lions	Season loan
1 July 2026	FW	(Singapore) Adam Faisal	(Singapore) Balestier Khalsa	Free
30 July 2026	GK	(Singapore) Kenneth Ng	(Singapore) Young Lions	Season loan
30 July 2026	MF	(Singapore) Aryan Sahib	(Singapore) Young Lions	Season loan
8 August 2026	GK	(Singapore) Seth Lee	(Singapore) Young Lions	Season loan
8 August 2026	MF	(Singapore) Farrel Farhan	(Singapore) Young Lions	Season loan
1 September 2026	FW	(Singapore) (Iran) (England) Kian Ghadessy	(England) Loughborough Students	Free

=== Contract extensions ===
Position	Player	Ref
DF	(Singapore) Lionel Tan	3 years from Jun-26 to Jun-29
DF	(Singapore) Nur Adam	3 years from Jun-26 to Jun-29
DF	(Australia) Bailey Wright	1 year from Jun-26 to Jun-27
DF	(Croatia) Toni Datkovic	1 year from Jun-26 to Jun-27
MF	(Netherlands) Bart Ramselaar	2 years from Jun-26 to Jun-28
MF	(Singapore) (South Korea) Song Ui-young	1 year from Jun-26 to Jun-27

=== NS ===
Preseason

Position	Player	Transferred to	Ref
FW	(Singapore) (Iran) (England) Kian Ghadessy	(Singapore) SAFSA	On national service until August 2026
FW	(Singapore) (Germany) Fernandez Casey Klein	(Singapore) SAFSA	On national service until October 2026
MF	(Singapore) Nathan Mao	(Singapore) SAFSA	On national service until March 2027
DF	(Singapore) Muhammad Fadly	(Singapore) SAFSA	On national service until April 2027
DF	(Singapore) Idzham Eszuan	(Singapore) SAFSA	On national service until April 2027
FW	(Singapore) Ahmad Luthfi Rusfatzilella	(Singapore) SAFSA	On national service until May 2027
DF	(Singapore) Ilhan Rizqullah	(Singapore) SAFSA	On national service until August 2027
FW	(Singapore) (Nigeria) Uchenna Eziakor	(Singapore) SAFSA	On national service until October 2027
DF	(Singapore) Luth Harith	(Singapore) SAFSA	On national service until July 2028
MF	(Singapore) Andy Reefqy	(Singapore) SAFSA	On national service until July 2028
MF	(Singapore) Harith Danish Irwan	(Singapore) SAFSA	On national service until April 2028

== Friendly ==
=== Pre-season ===
Win Draw Loss

15 August 2026 1	Selangor (Malaysia)	cancelled	(Singapore) Lion City Sailors	Petaling Jaya, Malaysia
				Stadium: MBPJ Stadium

=== Tour of Spain (16–30 August 2026) ===
21 August 2026 2	Cádiz CF Mirandilla (Spain)	cancelled	(Singapore) Lion City Sailors	Cádiz, Spain
				Stadium: Bahía de Cádiz Sports Complex Pitch 4

22 August 2026 3	Atlético Madrileño (Spain)	1–1	(Singapore) Lion City Sailors	Jerez, Spain
	Joel		Matthias Phaëton	Stadium: Barceló Montecastillo Golf Sport Resort

25 August 2026 4	Xerez Deportivo (Spain)	1–1	(Singapore) Lion City Sailors	Cádiz, Spain
	49'; (penalty missed) 24		Antonio Mance 33' (pen.)	Stadium: Barceló Montecastillo Golf & Sports Resort

29 August 2026 5	Atlético Malagueño (Spain)	2–3	(Singapore) Lion City Sailors	Málaga, Spain
			Antonio Manse; Shawal Anuar; Lennart Thy	Stadium: Profutcamps

=== Mid-season ===
Win Draw Loss

== Team statistics ==
=== Appearances and goals ===
As of 17 May 2026

No.	Pos.	Player	Singapore Premier League		Singapore Cup		Community Shield		AFC Champions League Two		ASEAN Club Championship		Total	
No.	Pos.	Player	Apps.	Goals	Apps.	Goals	Apps.	Goals	Apps.	Goals	Apps.	Goals	Apps.	Goals
1	GK	(Brazil) Victor Aznar	0	0	0	0	0	0	0	0	0	0	0	0
2	DF	(Georgia (country)) (Portugal) Jorge Karseladze	0	0	0	0	0	0	0	0	0	0	0	0
3	DF	(Brazil) Hugo Gomes	0	0	0	0	0	0	0	0	0	0	0	0
4	DF	(Croatia) Toni Datković	0	0	0	0	0	0	0	0	0	0	0	0
5	DF	(Singapore) Lionel Tan	0	0	0	0	0	0	0	0	0	0	0	0
6	MF	(Cameroon) (Germany) Tsiy-William Ndenge	0	0	0	0	0	0	0	0	0	0	0	0
7	FW	(Singapore) Shawal Anuar	0	0	0	0	0	0	0	0	0	0	0	0
8	MF	(Singapore) (Japan) Kyoga Nakamura	0	0	0	0	0	0	0	0	0	0	0	0
9	FW	(Germany) Lennart Thy	0	0	0	0	0	0	0	0	0	0	0	0
10	MF	(Netherlands) Bart Ramselaar	0	0	0	0	0	0	0	0	0	0	0	0
11	FW	(Singapore) Glenn Kweh	0	0	0	0	0	0	0	0	0	0	0	0
12	FW	(Croatia) Antonio Mance	0	0	0	0	0	0	0	0	0	0	0	0
13	GK	(Singapore) Adib Azahari	0	0	0	0	0	0	0	0	0	0	0	0
14	MF	(Singapore) Hariss Harun	0	0	0	0	0	0	0	0	0	0	0	0
15	MF	(Singapore) (South Korea) Song Ui-young	0	0	0	0	0	0	0	0	0	0	0	0
16	MF	(Singapore) Hami Syahin	0	0	0	0	0	0	0	0	0	0	0	0
17	FW	(Singapore) (South Africa) Ilhan Fandi	0	0	0	0	0	0	0	0	0	0	0	0
18	DF	(Singapore) (Wales) Ryhan Stewart	0	0	0	0	0	0	0	0	0	0	0	0
19	FW	(Singapore) Farhan Zulkifli	0	0	0	0	0	0	0	0	0	0	0	0
20	DF	(Singapore) Nur Adam Abdullah	0	0	0	0	0	0	0	0	0	0	0	0
21	FW	(Singapore) (Nigeria) Abdul Rasaq	0	0	0	0	0	0	0	0	0	0	0	0
22	MF	(Singapore) Nur Muhammad Asis	0	0	0	0	0	0	0	0	0	0	0	0
23	FW	(Guadeloupe) (France) Matthias Phaëton	0	0	0	0	0	0	0	0	0	0	0	0
24	MF	(France) (Italy) Giovanni Haag	0	0	0	0	0	0	0	0	0	0	0	0
25	GK	(Croatia) Ivan Sušak	0	0	0	0	0	0	0	0	0	0	0	0
26	DF	(Australia) Bailey Wright	0	0	0	0	0	0	0	0	0	0	0	0
29	DF	(Portugal) Diogo Costa	0	0	0	0	0	0	0	0	0	0	0	0
30	FW	(Netherlands) (Nigeria) Bobby Adekanye	0	0	0	0	0	0	0	0	0	0	0	0
Players who have played this season but had left the club on loan to other club
Players who have played this season but had left the club

== Competitions ==
=== Community Shield ===
6 September 2026 Community Shield	Lion City Sailors (Singapore)	2–0	(Singapore) Tampines Rovers	Jalan Besar
	Ilhan Fandi 17', 26'	Report	Jacob Mahler (yellow card) 61'; Koya Kazama (yellow card) 74'	Stadium: Jalan Besar Stadium; Attendance: 3,865; Referee: Khairul Amri; Man of the Match: (Singapore) Ilhan Fandi

=== Singapore Premier League ===
12 September 2026 1	Hougang United (Singapore)	2–2	(Singapore) Lion City Sailors	Bishan
	Ayman Kassimi 17' (yellow card) 83'; Oakley Cannonier 22'; Huzaifah Aziz (yellow card) 43'; Lucas Cardoso (yellow card) 71'	Report	Antonio Mance 38'; Bobby Adekanye 86'; Ryhan Stewart (yellow card) 78'	Stadium: Bishan Stadium; Referee: Oswind Suriya; Man of the Match: (Belgium) (Morocco) Ayman Kassimi

4 February 2027 2 (Rescheduled)	Lion City Sailors (Singapore)	–	(Singapore) Tampines Rovers	Jalan Besar
				Stadium: Jalan Besar Stadium

11 October 2026 3	Lion City Sailors (Singapore)	6–1	(Singapore) Young Lions	Jalan Besar
	Bart Ramselaar 13'; Hugo Gomes 37'; Bailey Wright 51'; Ilhan Fandi 70'; Matthias Phaëton 73', 83'; Nur Adams (yellow card) 53'	Report	Toi Kagami 10'; Fairuz Fazli Koh (yellow card) 50'; Hisatoshi Nishido (yellow card) 53'; Andy Reefqy (yellow card) 90+1'	Stadium: Jalan Besar Stadium; Referee: Hilmi Fuad; Man of the Match: (Guadeloupe) (France) Matthias Phaëton

18 October 2026 4	FC Jurong (Singapore)	0–2	(Singapore) Lion City Sailors	Jurong East
	Syed Firdaus (yellow card) 54'	Report	Giovanni Haag 41' (pen.); Shawal Anuar 77'	Stadium: Jurong East Stadium; Referee: Ahmad A'Qashah; Man of the Match: (Portugal) Diogo Costa

25 October 2026 5	Lion City Sailors (Singapore)	6–0	(Singapore) Tanjong Pagar United	Jalan Besar
	Hugo Gomes 37'; Matthias Phaëton 60'; Antonio Mance 70', 90+3'; Giovanni Haag 86'; Hariss Harun 90+5'; Song Ui-young (yellow card) 46'	Report	Kieran Teo Jia Jun (yellow card) 54'; Jared Gallagher (yellow card) 63'; Marvin Anieboh (yellow card) 78'; Lazar Vujanic (yellow card) 85'	Stadium: Jalan Besar Stadium; Referee: Syarqawi Buhari; Man of the Match: (Brazil) Hugo Gomes

1 November 2026 6	Balestier Khalsa (Singapore)	0–4	(Singapore) Lion City Sailors	Bishan
	Yushin Otake (yellow card) 65'; Syafi Hilman (yellow card) 82'		Shawal Anuar 31'; Antonio Mance 37' (pen.); Matthias Phaëton 80'; Lennart Thy 85'	Stadium: Bishan Stadium; Referee: Clarence Leow; Man of the Match: (Singapore) Farhan Zulkifli

22 November 2026 7	Lion City Sailors (Singapore)	5–0	(Singapore) Geylang International	Jalan Besar
	Toni Datković 45' (yellow card) 39'; Matthias Phaëton 47'; Lennart Thy 52' (pen.), 60'; Ilhan Fandi 80'; Kyoga Nakamura (yellow card) 39'; Hugo Gomes (yellow card) 74'; Giovanni Haag (yellow card) 82'; Lionel Tan (yellow card) 86'		Kim Tae-uk (yellow card) 51'	Stadium: Jalan Besar Stadium; Referee: Hilmi Fuad

29 November 2026 8	Young Lions (Singapore)	–	(Singapore) Lion City Sailors	Jalan Besar
				Stadium: Jalan Besar Stadium

14 February 2027 9	Lion City Sailors (Singapore)	–	(Singapore) FC Jurong	Jalan Besar
				Stadium: Jalan Besar Stadium

21 February 2027 10	Balestier Khalsa (Singapore)	–	(Singapore) Lion City Sailors	Bishan
				Stadium: Bishan Stadium

28 February 2027 11	Lion City Sailors (Singapore)	–	(Singapore) Hougang United	Jalan Besar
				Stadium: Jalan Besar Stadium

7 March 2027 12	Lion City Sailors (Singapore)	–	(Singapore) Tampines Rovers	Jalan Besar
				Stadium: Jalan Besar Stadium

14 March 2027 13	Geylang International (Singapore)	–	(Singapore) Lion City Sailors	Tampines
				Stadium: Our Tampines Hub

24 January 2027 14 (Rescheduled)	Tanjong Pagar United (Singapore)	–	(Singapore) Lion City Sailors	Jurong East
				Stadium: Jurong East Stadium

4 April 2027 15	Lion City Sailors (Singapore)	–	(Singapore) Geylang International	Jalan Besar
				Stadium: Jalan Besar Stadium

31 January 2027 16 (Rescheduled)	FC Jurong (Singapore)	–	(Singapore) Lion City Sailors	Jurong East
				Stadium: Jurong East Stadium

18 April 2027 17	Lion City Sailors (Singapore)	–	(Singapore) Young Lions	Jalan Besar
				Stadium: Jalan Besar Stadium

24 April 2027 18	Tampines Rovers (Singapore)	–	(Singapore) Lion City Sailors	Tampines
				Stadium: Our Tampines Hub

30 April 2027 19	Lion City Sailors (Singapore)	–	(Singapore) Hougang United	Jalan Besar
				Stadium: Jalan Besar Stadium

9 May 2027 20	Lion City Sailors (Singapore)	–	(Singapore) Balestier Khalsa	Jalan Besar
				Stadium: Jalan Besar Stadium

15 May 2027 21	Tanjong Pagar United (Singapore)	–	(Singapore) Lion City Sailors	Jurong East
				Stadium: Jurong East Stadium

Pos	Teams	Pld	W	D	L	GF	GA	GD	Pts
1	Lion City Sailors	6	5	1	0	25	3	+22	16
2	Tampines Rovers	6	5	1	0	18	3	+15	16
3	Geylang International	7	4	2	1	12	7	+5	14
4	FC Jurong	7	3	1	3	14	11	+3	10
5	Tanjong Pagar United	7	3	1	3	11	18	−7	10
6	Balestier Khalsa	7	2	1	4	9	15	−6	7
7	Young Lions (Note: Young Lions are not eligible to represent Singapore in AFC club competitions.)	7	1	0	6	8	25	−17	3
8	Hougang United	7	0	1	6	4	19	−15	1

Updated to match(es) played on 22 November 2026. Source: Singapore Premier League
Rules for classification: 1) Points; 2) goal difference; 3) goals scored; 4) wins

=== AFC Champions League Two ===
==== Group stage ====
Pos	Team	Pld	W	D	L	GF	GA	GD	Pts	Qualification	LCS	BGP	ADE	TPF
1	(Singapore) Lion City Sailors	4	3	1	0	9	1	+8	10	Advance to round of 16	—	1–1	5–0	–
2	(Thailand) BG Pathum United	4	2	1	1	9	4	+5	7	Advance to round of 16	–	—	1–2	4–1
3	(Australia) Adelaide United	4	2	0	2	5	8	−3	6		0–2	–	—	3–0
4	(Hong Kong) Tai Po (E)	4	0	0	4	1	11	−10	0		0–1	0–3	–	—

Updated to match(es) played on 5 November 2026. Source: ACL2
Rules for classification: Tiebreakers
(E) Eliminated

17 September 2026 1	Lion City Sailors (Singapore)	1–1	(Thailand) BG Pathum United	Jalan Besar, Singapore
	Marko Nikolić 24' (o.g.); Song Ui-young (yellow card) 34'; Toni Datković (yellow card) 35'	Report	Patrik Gustavsson 51'; Edin Osmanovic (yellow card) 24'; Surachat Sareepim (yellow card) 75'; Elijah Dolah (yellow card) 82'	Stadium: Jalan Besar Stadium; Attendance: 1,853; Referee: Resul Mämmedow (Turkmenistan); Man of the Match: (Thailand) Patrik Gustavsson

15 October 2026 2	Tai Po (Hong Kong)	0–1	(Singapore) Lion City Sailors	Mong Kok, Hong Kong
	Paulinho Simionato (yellow card) 64'	Report	Matthias Phaëton 48'; Giovanni Haag (yellow card) 75'	Stadium: Mong Kok Stadium; Attendance: 976; Referee: Chae Sang-hyeop (South Korea); Man of the Match: (Guadeloupe) Matthias Phaëton

29 October 2026 3	Adelaide United (Australia)	0–2	(Singapore) Lion City Sailors	Adelaide, Australia
	Anselmo (yellow card) 43'; Sotiri Phillis (yellow card) 75'	Report	Hugo Gomes 81'; Lennart Thy 90+3'	Stadium: Hindmarsh Stadium; Attendance: 3,762; Referee: Clifford Daypuyat (Philippines); Man of the Match: (Brazil) Hugo Gomes

5 November 2026 4	Lion City Sailors (Singapore)	5–0	(Australia) Adelaide United	Jalan Besar, Singapore
	Matthias Phaëton 5', 75' (penalty missed) 88; Bailey Wright 17'; Kyoga Nakamura 41'; Ilhan Fandi 71'; Song Ui-young (yellow card) 90+3'	Report		Stadium: Jalan Besar Stadium; Attendance: 1,847; Referee: Senge Jakhiyibekov (Kyrgyzstan); Man of the Match: (Guadeloupe) Matthias Phaëton

26 November 2026 5	BG Pathum United (Thailand)	–	(Singapore) Lion City Sailors	Pathum Thani, Thailand
		Report		Stadium: Pathum Thani Stadium

3 December 2026 6	Lion City Sailors (Singapore)	–	(Hong Kong) Tai Po	Jalan Besar, Singapore
		Report		Stadium: Jalan Besar Stadium

=== ASEAN Club Championship ===
==== Group stage ====
Pos	Team	Pld	W	D	L	GF	GA	GD	Pts	Qualification	JDT	SIB	CAH	PKR	LCS	POR	SUN
1	(Malaysia) Johor Darul Ta'zim	2	2	0	0	9	1	+8	6	Advance to knockout stage	—	—	—	6–0	1 Apr	—	10 Dec
2	(Indonesia) Persib	2	2	0	0	9	1	+8	6	Advance to knockout stage	17 Dec	—	4 Mar	—	—	—	6–0
3	(Vietnam) Công An Hà Nội	2	1	0	1	2	3	−1	3	Advance to knockout stage	1–3	—	—	10 Dec	—	—	25 Feb
4	(Cambodia) PKR Svay Rieng	2	1	0	1	4	7	−3	3	Advance to knockout stage	—	25 Feb	—	—	17 Dec	4–1	—
5	(Singapore) Lion City Sailors	1	0	0	1	0	1	−1	0		—	10 Dec	0–1	—	—	25 Feb	—
6	(Thailand) Port	2	0	0	2	2	7	−5	0		4 Mar	1–3	1 Apr	—	—	—	—
7	(Myanmar) Shan United	1	0	0	1	0	6	−6	0		—	—	—	1 Apr	4 Mar	17 Dec	—

Updated to match(es) played on 19 November 2026. Source: ASEAN United
Rules for classification: Tiebreakers

8 October 2026 1	Lion City Sailors (Singapore)	0–1	(Vietnam) Công An Hà Nội	Jalan Besar, Singapore
	Bailey Wright (yellow card) 36'	Report	Léo Artur 45+1'; Damià Sabater (yellow card) 26'; Brayan Perea (yellow card) 81'	Stadium: Jalan Besar Stadium; Attendance: 1,887; Referee: Hiroki Kasahara (Japan); Man of the Match: (Brazil) Léo Artur

10 December 2026 2	Lion City Sailors (Singapore)	–	(Indonesia) Persib Bandung	Jalan Besar, Singapore
		Report		Stadium: Jalan Besar Stadium

17 December 2026 3	PKR Svay Rieng (Cambodia)	–	(Singapore) Lion City Sailors	Svay Rieng, Cambodia
		Report		Stadium: Svay Rieng Stadium

25 February 2027 4	Lion City Sailors (Singapore)	–	(Thailand) Port	Jalan Besar, Singapore
		Report		Stadium: Jalan Besar Stadium

4 March 2027 5	Shan United (Myanmar)	–	(Singapore) Lion City Sailors	Taunggyi, Myanmar
		Report		Stadium: Taunggyi Stadium

1 April 2027 6	Johor Darul Ta'zim (Malaysia)	–	(Singapore) Lion City Sailors	Johor, Malaysia
		Report		Stadium: Sultan Ibrahim Stadium

== Competition (SPL2) ==
Win Draw Loss

25 August 2026 1	Lion City Sailors (Singapore)	1–4	(Singapore) Tanjong Pagar United	Jurong East
	Jasper Chen 90'; Tyler Tan (yellow card) 28'		Boris Kopitović 2', 45+1', 66'; Taufik Suparno 7'	Stadium: Jurong East Stadium

30 August 2026 2	Tampines Rovers (Singapore)	3–0	(Singapore) Lion City Sailors	Tampines
	Matthias Koesno 26' (yellow card) 82'; Naufal Mohammad 42'; Kenshin Yamazaki 60'; Yuma Kimura (yellow card) 45'		Tyler Tan (yellow card) 72'; Aaryan Hermi (yellow card) 85'	Stadium: Our Tampines Hub

3 September 2026 3	Geylang International (Singapore)	4–0	(Singapore) Lion City Sailors	Bedok
	Ryoya Taniguchi 27'; Sahil Suhaimi 84'; Ryang Hyon-ju 87', 90'		Caden Pereira (yellow card) 82'	Stadium: Bedok Stadium

8 September 2026 4	Lion City Sailors (Singapore)	5–1	(Singapore) Hougang United	Bedok
	Aufa Basyar 16', 50'; Izzan Rifqi 35', 45+2'; Ahmad Danial 87'	Report	Nigel Ho 58'; Farhan Sahlan (yellow card) 59'	Stadium: Bedok Stadium

19 October 2026 5	Lion City Sailors (Singapore)	1–3	(Singapore) Balestier Khalsa	Bedok
			Danie Hafiy 40'; Zikos Chua 81' (pen.); Ethan Pinto 82'	Stadium: Bedok Stadium

7 November 2026 6	FC Jurong (Singapore)	–	(Singapore) Lion City Sailors	Jurong East
				Stadium: Jurong East Stadium

5 December 2026 7	Young Lions (Singapore)	–	(Singapore) Lion City Sailors	Bedok
				Stadium: Bedok Stadium

13 December 2026 8	Lion City Sailors (Singapore)	–	(Singapore) Tanjong Pagar United	Bedok
				Stadium: Bedok Stadium

16 December 2026 9	Lion City Sailors (Singapore)	–	(Singapore) Tampines Rovers	Bedok
				Stadium: Bedok Stadium

20 September 2026 10 (Rescheduled)	Geylang International (Singapore)	3–0	(Singapore) Lion City Sailors	Bedok
	Ryoya Taniguchi 19', 45'; Milan Landreman 33'; Diego Aspiras (yellow card) 31'; Sahil Suhaimi (yellow card) 32'		Caden Pereira (yellow card) 51'; Aiman Eszuan (yellow card) 90'; Aryan Bahadur Chhetri (yellow card) 90+1'	Stadium: Bedok Stadium; Referee: Thawfeek Ahamad

5 January 2027 11	Lion City Sailors (Singapore)	–	(Singapore) Hougang United	Bedok
				Stadium: Bedok Stadium

8 January 2027 12	Balestier Khalsa (Singapore)	–	(Singapore) Lion City Sailors	Bishan
				Stadium: Bishan Stadium

12 January 2027 13	Lion City Sailors (Singapore)	–	(Singapore) FC Jurong	Jurong East
				Stadium: Jurong East Stadium

16 January 2027 14	Young Lions (Singapore)	–	(Singapore) Lion City Sailors	Bedok
				Stadium: Bedok Stadium

20 January 2027 15	Tanjong Pagar United (Singapore)	–	(Singapore) Lion City Sailors	Choa Chu Kang
				Stadium: Choa Chu Kang Stadium

24 January 2027 16	Lion City Sailors (Singapore)	–	(Singapore) Tampines Rovers	Tampines
				Stadium: Our Tampines Hub

30 January 2027 17	Lion City Sailors (Singapore)	–	(Singapore) Geylang International	Bedok
				Stadium: Bedok Stadium

3 February 2027 18	Hougang United (Singapore)	–	(Singapore) Lion City Sailors	Choa Chu Kang
				Stadium: Choa Chu Kang Stadium

22 February 2027 19	Lion City Sailors (Singapore)	–	(Singapore) Balestier Khalsa	Tampines
				Stadium: Our Tampines Hub

1 March 2027 20	FC Jurong (Singapore)	–	(Singapore) Lion City Sailors	Jurong East
				Stadium: Jurong East Stadium

5 April 2027 21	Lion City Sailors (Singapore)	–	(Singapore) Young Lions	Bedok
				Stadium: Bedok Stadium

== Competition (U19) ==
=== 2026 ===
2026 Division 1 (Stage 1) League matches & table

28 February 2026 1	Lion City Sailors (Singapore)	6–2	(Singapore) BG Tampines Rovers	Woodleigh
				Stadium: The Arena

7 March 2026 2	Lion City Sailors (Singapore)	1–1	(Singapore) Mattar Sailors	Kallang
				Stadium: Kallang Football Hub

28 March 2026 3	Lion City Sailors (Singapore)	8–0	(Singapore) Balestier Khalsa	Yishun
				Stadium: Yishun Stadium

23 May 2026 4 (Rescheduled)	Lion City Sailors (Singapore)	2–1	(Singapore) Albirex Jurong	Kallang
				Stadium: Kallang Football Hub

18 April 2026 5	Lion City Sailors (Singapore)	3–1	(Singapore) Hougang United	Yishun
				Stadium: Yishun Stadium

2 May 2026 6	Lion City Sailors (Singapore)	3–0	(Singapore) Tanjong Pagar United	Kallang
				Stadium: Kallang Football Hub

9 May 2026 7	Lion City Sailors (Singapore)	4–1	(Singapore) Coerver Coaching	Clementi
				Stadium: Clementi Stadium

16 May 2026 8	Lion City Sailors (Singapore)	2–1	(Singapore) Geylang International	Kallang
				Stadium: Kallang Football Hub

Pos	Team	Pld	W	D	L	GF	GA	GD	Pts	Qualification or relegation
1	Lion City Sailors	8	7	1	0	29	7	+22	22	
2	Geylang International	8	6	1	1	22	10	+12	19	
3	Mattar Sailors	8	6	1	1	19	8	+11	19	Withdrew from the 2026 SYL season
4	Albirex Jurong	8	3	1	4	10	11	−1	10	
5	BG Tampines Rovers	8	2	2	4	15	20	−5	8	
6	Balestier Khalsa	8	2	2	4	6	20	−14	8	
7	Tanjong Pagar United	8	2	1	5	13	15	−2	7	
8	Coerver Coaching	8	1	2	5	13	20	−7	5	
9	Hougang United	8	1	1	6	7	23	−16	4	

Updated to match(es) played on 31 May 2026. Source: Singapore Youth League

2026 SPYL League matches & table

Lion City Sailors

16 August 2026 1	Lion City Sailors (Singapore)	2–0	(Singapore) Tanjong Pagar United	Woodlands
	Asher Jordan Morriss 3'; Tan Zheng Rui 58'; Isyraf Fhirhad (yellow card) 40'	Report	Khairul Hisyam (yellow card) 43'; Xia Zeyu (yellow card) 63'	Stadium: Woodlands Stadium

23 August 2026 2	Lion City Sailors (Singapore)	3–1	(Singapore) Tampines Rovers	Woodlands
	Asher Jordan Morriss 12'; Aiden Yang Zhekai 38'; Kieren Tan Kai Xiang 58' (o.g.)	Report	Arfiq Rizzuwan 37'; Haziq Zulkifli (yellow card) 66'; Raihan Rafiq (yellow card) 85'	Stadium: Woodlands Stadium

30 August 2026 3	Lion City Sailors (Singapore)	cancelled	(Singapore) Coerver Coaching	Woodlands
				Stadium: Woodlands Stadium

6 September 2026 4	Lion City Sailors (Singapore)	0–0	(Singapore) Geylang International	Serangoon
	Tan Zheng Rui (yellow card) 20'; Shlok Ranadive (yellow card) 53'; Daniel Mehta (yellow card) 67'	Report	Sachin Dev Balamurali (yellow card) 67'	Stadium: Serangoon Stadium

13 September 2026 5	Lion City Sailors (Singapore)	2–0	(Singapore) FC Jurong	Woodlands
	Asher Jordan Morriss 31'; Ahmad Aydin 73'; Dante James Pinto (yellow card) 56'; Adryan Alfian (yellow card) 83'; Jacas Jun Hao Tjhai (yellow card) 90'	Report	Shaun Shaik (yellow card) 82'	Stadium: Woodlands Stadium

27 September 2026 6	Lion City Sailors (Singapore)	1–1	(Singapore) Sailors DC	Woodlands
	Adryan Alfian (yellow card) 94' (yellow card) 34'; Daniel Mehta (yellow card) 30'; Asher Jordan Morriss (yellow card) 67'; Jacas Jun Hao Tjhai (yellow card) 70'; Asher Jordan Morriss (yellow card) 30'	Report	Xavier Tan Shan Yang (yellow card) 90'; Sean Luke Ong (yellow card) 58'; Joshua Chong Rong Kai (yellow card) 90+3'	Stadium: Woodlands Stadium

4 October 2026 7	Lion City Sailors (Singapore)	5–0	(Singapore) Hougang United	Woodlands
	Tan Yu Bin 26', 42'; Fikri Aqil 38'; Tan Zheng Rui 73'; Ahmad Aydin 90+1'	Report		Stadium: Woodlands Stadium

October 2026 8 (Rescheduled)	Lion City Sailors (Singapore)	–	(Singapore) Balestier Khalsa	Woodlands
				Stadium: Woodlands Stadium

Sailors Development Centre

October 2026 1 (Rescheduled)	Sailors DC (Singapore)	–	(Singapore) FC Jurong	Woodlands
				Stadium: Singapore American School

23 August 2026 2	Sailors DC (Singapore)	cancelled	(Singapore) Coerver Coaching	Woodlands
				Stadium: Woodlands Stadium

30 August 2026 3	Sailors DC (Singapore)	1–1	(Singapore) Hougang United	Woodlands
	Xavier Tan Shan Yang 48'; Aaryan Irzan (red card) 90+4'	Report	K S Barath Rathna Varshan 72'	Stadium: Woodlands Stadium

6 September 2026 4	Sailors DC (Singapore)	3–0	(Singapore) Tampines Rovers	Woodlands
	Ziqry Eizyanshah 10'; Xavier Tan Shan Yang 40'; Aiman Zayani 55'	Report	Nur Aqil Rifaldy (yellow card) 7'	Stadium: Woodlands Stadium

13 September 2026 5	Sailors DC (Singapore)	6–0	(Singapore) Balestier Khalsa	Woodlands
	Xavier Tan Shan Yang 21', 41', 46'; Raiyan Izdihar 59'; Jadon Quah 81', 84'; Nor Irfan (yellow card) 35'; Alexander Koh (yellow card) 45'; Sean Luke Ong (yellow card) 51'; Ethan Joseph Varghese (yellow card) 65'	Report	Loukas Bo (yellow card) 22'; Damien Lee (yellow card) 72'	Stadium: Woodlands Stadium

20 September 2026 6	Sailors DC (Singapore)	0–0	(Singapore) Tanjong Pagar United	Woodlands
	Alexander Koh (yellow card) 22'; Karlheinz Oma Koppe (yellow card) 72'; Ziqry Eizyanshah (yellow card) 90+3'; Leandro Naim Santos (yellow card) 90+4'	Report	Lim Xuan Hui (red card) 22'; Shaikh Ziqry (yellow card) 62'	Stadium: Woodlands Stadium

27 September 2026 7	Sailors DC (Singapore)	1–1	(Singapore) Lion City Sailors	Woodlands
	Xavier Tan Shan Yang (yellow card) 90'; Sean Luke Ong (yellow card) 58'; Joshua Chong Rong Kai (yellow card) 90+3'	Report	Adryan Alfian (yellow card) 94' (yellow card) 34'; Daniel Mehta (yellow card) 30'; Asher Jordan Morriss (yellow card) 67'; Jacas Jun Hao Tjhai (yellow card) 70'; Asher Jordan Morriss (yellow card) 30'	Stadium: Woodlands Stadium

25 October 2026 8 (Rescheduled)	Sailors DC (Singapore)	–	(Singapore) Geylang International	Woodlands
				Stadium: Woodlands Stadium

Pos	Team	Pld	W	D	L	GF	GA	GD	Pts	Qualification or relegation
1	Lion City Sailors	6	4	2	0	13	2	+11	14	League champion
2	Geylang International	6	3	2	1	11	7	+4	11	
3	Sailors DC	5	2	3	0	11	2	+9	9	
4	Tanjong Pagar United	6	2	2	2	5	5	0	8	
5	Tampines Rovers	7	2	2	3	11	12	−1	8	
6	FC Jurong	6	2	2	2	10	11	−1	8	
7	Balestier Khalsa	6	1	1	4	8	20	−12	4	
8	Hougang United	6	0	2	4	5	15	−10	2	Relegated to 2026 Stage 2 Division 2
9	Coerver Coaching	0	0	0	0	0	0	0	0	Withdrew from the 2026 SPYL season

Updated to match(es) played on 4 Oct 2026. Source: Singapore Youth League

== Competition (U17) ==
Win Draw Loss

=== 2026 ===
2026 Division 1 (Stage 1) League matches & table

Lion City Sailors

15 February 2026 1	Lion City Sailors (Singapore)	4–0	(Singapore) BG Tampines Rovers	Woodlands
				Stadium: Republic Poly

1 March 2026 2	Lion City Sailors (Singapore)	4–0	(Singapore) National Developmental Centre	Kallang
				Stadium: Kallang Football Hub

8 March 2026 3	Lion City Sailors (Singapore)	3–0	(Singapore) Balestier Khalsa	Woodlands
				Stadium: Singapore Sports School

29 March 2026 4	Lion City Sailors (Singapore)	4–3	(Singapore) Albirex Jurong	Woodlands
				Stadium: Republic Poly

12 April 2026 5	Lion City Sailors (Singapore)	7–1	(Singapore) St Michael's Soccer Academy	Yishun
				Stadium: Yishun Stadium

19 April 2026 6	Lion City Sailors (Singapore)	3–0	(Singapore) East Coast United	Clementi
				Stadium: Clementi Stadium

26 April 2026 7	Lion City Sailors (Singapore)	2–0	(Singapore) Tanjong Pagar United	Woodlands
				Stadium: Singapore Sports School

3 May 2026 8	Lion City Sailors (Singapore)	5–1	(Singapore) Development Centre AFA	Woodlands
				Stadium: Republic Poly

10 May 2026 9	Lion City Sailors (Singapore)	5–1	(Singapore) Geylang International	Clementi
				Stadium: Clementi Stadium

Pos	Team	Pld	W	D	L	GF	GA	GD	Pts	Qualification or relegation
1	Lion City Sailors	9	9	0	0	37	6	+31	27	Promote to Singapore Premier Youth League
2	St Michael Soccer Academy	9	6	2	1	22	13	+9	20	Promote to Singapore Premier Youth League
3	Geylang International	9	5	2	2	17	11	+6	17	Promote to Singapore Premier Youth League
4	BG Tampines Rovers	9	5	1	3	15	15	0	16	Promote to Singapore Premier Youth League
5	Development Centre AFA	9	4	1	4	9	12	−3	13	Withdrew from the 2026 SYL season
6	National Development Centre	9	3	2	4	7	14	−7	11	Promote to Singapore Premier Youth League
7	Albirex Jurong	9	3	1	5	15	18	−3	10	Promote to Singapore Premier Youth League
8	Tanjong Pagar United	9	3	0	6	15	16	−1	9	
9	Balestier Khalsa	9	2	1	6	7	15	−8	7	
10	East Coast United	9	0	0	9	4	28	−24	0	

Updated to match(es) played on 30 May 2026. Source: Singapore Youth League

2026 SPYL League matches & table

Lion City Sailors

15 August 2026 1	Lion City Sailors (Singapore)	0–2	(Singapore) FC Jurong	Woodlands
			Mohd Kazi Tobias Eirwani 49'; Mateo Cruz Olivarez 85' (yellow card) 89'; Xander Wong (yellow card); Harry Cookson (yellow card); Ahmad Aqil Shafie (yellow card) 29'; Arfiq Sharoni (yellow card) 59'; Tirmizi Effendi (yellow card) 60'	Stadium: Woodlands Stadium

22 August 2026 2	Lion City Sailors (Singapore)	3–0	(Singapore) National Development Centre	Woodlands
	Thabo Jan Fredrick 7', 18'; Yang Yeonjun 88'			Stadium: Woodlands Stadium

29 August 2026 3	Lion City Sailors (Singapore)	3–3	(Singapore) Geylang International	Woodlands
	Yang Yeonjun 42'; Thabo Jan Fredrick 51'; Tan Zheng Rui 88'		Findlay William Mcculloch Cowie 36', 54'; Rafael Kimi Lura 65'	Stadium: Woodlands Stadium

5 September 2026 4	Lion City Sailors (Singapore)	2–0	(Singapore) Active SG	Woodlands
	Thabo Jan Fredrick 47'; Yang Yeonjun 48'; Adryan Humahad (yellow card) 36'		Jonathan Anthony Wiskerke (yellow card) 28'; Akmal Tahir (yellow card) 46'; Ian Haqimy (yellow card) 66'	Stadium: Woodlands Stadium

12 September 2026 5	Lion City Sailors (Singapore)	1–6	(Singapore) Sailors DC	Yishun
	Thabo Jan Fredrick 85'; Marcellus Tng Chun Kee (yellow card) 60'	Report	Salvador Carreira Pereira 2', 75', 77'; Ajai Kadhir Maran 15' (pen.); Dylan Ng Jing Hang 29'; Leandro Naim Santos 49'	Stadium: Yishun Stadium

19 September 2026 6	Lion City Sailors (Singapore)	3–1	(Singapore) Tampines Rovers	Yishun
	Thabo Jan Fredrick (??), 35'; Marcellus Tng Chun Kee 60'; Thabo Jan Fredrick 35'; Yeonjun Yang (yellow card) 20'; Syed Amri (yellow card) 23'; Shahid Sudheer (yellow card) 75'	Report	Dafi Fitri Johari 56'; Gareth Anthony Goh (yellow card) 50'; Alfie Arieyanddy Asrin (yellow card) 78'	Stadium: Yishun Stadium

26 September 2026 7	Lion City Sailors (Singapore)	0–2	(Singapore) St Michael Soccer Academy	Yishun
	Matthew Liu Zhiyang (yellow card) 57'; Hugo Bouvard (yellow card) 90+3'	Report	Keanu Song 35', 50'; Jaden Ming Yan Han (yellow card) 36'	Stadium: Yishun Stadium

2026 8 (Rescheduled)	Lion City Sailors (Singapore)	–	(Singapore) FC Jurong	Woodlands
				Stadium: Woodlands Stadium

2026 9 (Rescheduled)	Lion City Sailors (Singapore)	–	(Singapore) National Development Centre	Kallang
				Stadium: Kallang Football Hub

2026 10 (Rescheduled)	Lion City Sailors (Singapore)	–	(Singapore) Geylang International	Yishun
				Stadium: Yishun Stadium

24 October 2026 11	Lion City Sailors (Singapore)	–	(Singapore) Active SG	Yishun
				Stadium: Yishun Stadium

31 October 2026 12	Lion City Sailors (Singapore)	–	(Singapore) Sailors DC	Yishun
				Stadium: Yishun Stadium

14 November 2026 13	Lion City Sailors (Singapore)	–	(Singapore) Tampines Rovers	Woodlands
				Stadium: Woodlands Stadium

21 November 2026 14	Lion City Sailors (Singapore)	–	(Singapore) St Michael Soccer Academy	Woodlands
				Stadium: Woodlands Stadium

Sailors Development Centre

15 August 2026 1	Sailors DC (Singapore)	7–1	(Singapore) Active SG	Woodlands
	Theeraj Kumar Lalith Kumar 4', 24', 58'; Leandro Naim Santos 6'; Ethan Joseph Varghese 16'; Rohit Abraham 31', 56'		Ryoga Sanjo 59'	Stadium: Woodlands Stadium

2026 2 (Rescheduled)	Sailors DC (Singapore)	–	(Singapore) Geylang International	Woodlands
				Stadium: Woodlands Stadium

29 August 2026 3	Sailors DC (Singapore)	1–1	(Singapore) Tampines Rovers	Woodlands
	Joshua Rong Kai Chong 69'		Rayhaan Khan Mohamed Hanif 67'	Stadium: Woodlands Stadium

5 September 2026 4	Sailors DC (Singapore)	0–1	(Singapore) National Development Centre	Kallang
			Alfred Charles Potts 76'	Stadium: Kallang Football Hub

12 September 2026 5	Sailors DC (Singapore)	6–1	(Singapore) Lion City Sailors	Yishun
	Salvador Carreira Pereira 2', 75', 77'; Ajai Kadhir Maran 15' (pen.); Dylan Ng Jing Hang 29'; Leandro Naim Santos 49'	Report	Thabo Jan Fredrick 85'; Marcellus Tng Chun Kee (yellow card) 60'	Stadium: Yishun Stadium

24 October 2026 6 (Rescheduled)	Sailors DC (Singapore)	–	(Singapore) St Michael Soccer Academy	Woodlands
				Stadium: Woodlands Stadium

26 September 2026 7	Sailors DC (Singapore)	1–0	(Singapore) FC Jurong	Woodlands
	Rohit Abraham 67'	Report		Stadium: Woodlands Stadium

2026 8 (Rescheduled)	Sailors DC (Singapore)	–	(Singapore) Active SG	Woodlands
				Stadium: Woodlands Stadium

2026 9 (Rescheduled)	Sailors DC (Singapore)	–	(Singapore) Geylang International	Woodlands
				Stadium: Woodlands Stadium

2026 10 (Rescheduled)	Sailors DC (Singapore)	–	(Singapore) Tampines Rovers	Yishun
				Stadium: Yishun Stadium

24 October 2026 11	Sailors DC (Singapore)	–	(Singapore) National Development Centre	Kallang
				Stadium: Kallang Football Hub

31 October 2026 12	Sailors DC (Singapore)	–	(Singapore) Lion City Sailors	Yishun
				Stadium: Yishun Stadium

14 November 2026 13	Sailors DC (Singapore)	–	(Singapore) St Michael Soccer Academy	Woodlands
				Stadium: Woodlands Stadium

21 November 2026 14	Sailors DC (Singapore)	–	(Singapore) FC Jurong	Woodlands
				Stadium: Woodlands Stadium

Pos	Team	Pld	W	D	L	GF	GA	GD	Pts	Qualification or relegation
1	Geylang International	6	4	2	0	23	8	+15	14	League champion
2	Sailors DC	5	3	1	1	12	4	+8	10	
3	St Michael Soccer Academy	6	3	1	2	7	4	+3	10	
4	FC Jurong	7	3	1	3	9	9	0	10	
5	Lion City Sailors	7	3	1	3	12	14	−2	10	
6	Tampines Rovers	7	2	2	3	8	10	−2	8	
7	National Development Centre	7	1	3	3	9	15	−6	6	Relegated to 2026 Stage 2 Division 2
8	ActiveSG	7	1	1	5	2	21	−19	4	Relegated to 2026 Stage 2 Division 2

Updated to match(es) played on 26 Sept 2026. Source: Singapore Youth League

== Competition (U15) ==
Win Draw Loss

=== 2026 ===
2026 Division 1 (Stage 1) League matches & table

Lion City Sailors

2026 1 (Rescheduled)	Lion City Sailors (Singapore)	3–0	(Singapore) Development Centre AFA	Woodleigh
				Stadium: The Arena

Match is postponed due to incremental weather

28 February 2026 2	Lion City Sailors (Singapore)	14–0	(Singapore) Tasek Sailors West	Serangoon
				Stadium: Serangoon Stadium

7 March 2026 3	Lion City Sailors (Singapore)	2–2	(Singapore) National Development Centre	Kallang
				Stadium: Kallang Football Hub

28 March 2026 4	Lion City Sailors (Singapore)	3–1	Singapore Sports School	Woodlands
				Stadium: Singapore Sports School

11 April 2026 5	Lion City Sailors (Singapore)	0–1	(Singapore) Tanjong Pagar United	Clementi
				Stadium: Clementi Stadium

18 April 2026 6	Lion City Sailors (Singapore)	2–2	(Singapore) Albirex Jurong	Yishun
				Stadium: Yishun Stadium

25 April 2026 7	Lion City Sailors (Singapore)	0–2	(Singapore) Balestier Khalsa	Yishun
				Stadium: Yishun Stadium

2026 8 (Rescheduled)	Lion City Sailors (Singapore)	0–1	(Singapore) BG Tampines Rovers	Woodlands
				Stadium: Singapore American School

Match is postponed due to incremental weather

9 May 2026 9	Lion City Sailors (Singapore)	2–1	(Singapore) Geylang International	Bedok
				Stadium: Bedok Stadium

Pos	Team	Pld	W	D	L	GF	GA	GD	Pts	Qualification or relegation
1	Balestier Khalsa	9	6	3	0	33	12	+21	21	Promote to Singapore Premier Youth League
2	Geylang International	9	5	3	1	29	10	+19	18	Promote to Singapore Premier Youth League
3	National Development Centre	9	5	2	2	32	20	+12	17	Promote to Singapore Premier Youth League
4	Singapore Sports School	9	5	2	2	23	14	+9	17	Promote to Singapore Premier Youth League
5	Lion City Sailors	9	4	2	3	26	10	+16	14	Promote to Singapore Premier Youth League
6	Tanjong Pagar United	9	4	2	3	21	22	−1	14	
7	Albirex Jurong	9	4	1	4	32	20	+12	13	
8	BG Tampines Rovers	9	3	1	5	23	18	+5	10	
9	Development Centre AFA	9	1	0	8	9	36	−27	3	
10	Tasek Sailors West	9	0	0	9	7	73	−66	0	

Updated to match(es) played on 30 May 2026. Source: Singapore Youth League

2026 SPYL League matches & table

Lion City Sailors

16 August 2026 1	Lion City Sailors (Singapore)	0–6	(Singapore) Balestier Khalsa	Woodlands
			Sebastian Rohan Kleijne; Airell Aidil 14' (o.g.); Dechen Tamang 55'; Saifuool Shaikh 58', 65'; Aqil Bin Muhammad Khairul 61'	Stadium: Singapore Sports School

23 August 2026 2	Lion City Sailors (Singapore)	0–4	(Singapore) Sailors DC	Woodlands
			Lewis Sun Hongwen 12', 44'; Thierry Amyza Helmi 31'; Josh Lim Jun Rui 72'	Stadium: Singapore Sports School

30 August 2026 3	Lion City Sailors (Singapore)	2–0	(Singapore) EuroAsia FC	Woodlands
	Tengku Rayyan Rizqin 11'; Khalid Saifullah 66'	Report		Stadium: Singapore Sports School

6 September 2026 4	Lion City Sailors (Singapore)	1–3	(Singapore) National Development Centre	Kallang
	Tengku Rayyan Rizqin 24'; Shaqeel Iqbal Khan (yellow card) 4'; Aaron Ikechukwu (yellow card) 33'; Hazeeq Hazmi (yellow card) 56'; Ryan Qushairy (yellow card) 71'	Report	Gabriel Ng Yun Jun 26', 49' (yellow card) 41'; Tan Sheng De 69'; Jonas Chang Der Yan (yellow card) 27'; Rayn Izzam (yellow card) 57'; Rafizzy Iqbal (yellow card) 66'	Stadium: Kallang Football Hub

13 September 2026 5	Lion City Sailors (Singapore)	13–0	(Singapore) Global Football Academy	Woodlands
	Louis Anjie Pierquin 20', 73', 76'; Khaliesh Wafi 30', 48'; Raphael Neyl Courant 34'; Hazeeq Hazmi 42'; Ahyan Rahim 58', 66', 77', 81'; Aariq Arif 60'; Airell Aidil 67'			Stadium: Singapore Sports School

20 September 2026 6	Lion City Sailors (Singapore)	0–2	Singapore Sports School	Woodlands
	Aniq Aqish (yellow card) 25'; Aariq Arif (yellow card) 33'; Aaron Ikechukwu (yellow card) 65'	Report	Mervyn Yee Feng Ng 43'; Ilmal Yaqin 51'; Jack White (yellow card) 30'; Aizaqry Putra (yellow card) 50'; Bazil Zayyan (yellow card) 70'	Stadium: Singapore Sports School

25 October 2026 7 (Rescheduled)	Lion City Sailors (Singapore)	–	(Singapore) Geylang International	Woodlands
				Stadium: Singapore Sports School

4 October 2026 8	Lion City Sailors (Singapore)	–	(Singapore) Balestier Khalsa	Woodlands
				Stadium: Singapore Sports School

11 October 2026 9	Lion City Sailors (Singapore)	–	(Singapore) Sailors DC	Woodlands
				Stadium: Singapore Sports School

18 October 2026 10	Lion City Sailors (Singapore)	–	(Singapore) EuroAsia	Woodlands
				Stadium: Singapore Sports School

25 October 2026 11	Lion City Sailors (Singapore)	–	(Singapore) National Development Centre	Kallang
				Stadium: Kallang Football Hub

1 November 2026 12	Lion City Sailors (Singapore)	–	(Singapore) Global Football Academy	Woodlands
				Stadium: Singapore Sports School

15 November 2026 13	Lion City Sailors (Singapore)	–	Singapore Sports School	Woodlands
				Stadium: Singapore Sports School

22 November 2026 14	Lion City Sailors (Singapore)	–	(Singapore) Geylang International	Woodlands
				Stadium: Singapore Sports School

Sailors Development Centre

16 August 2026 1	Sailors DC (Singapore)	3–1	(Singapore) National Development Centre	Kallang
	Lucas Ling Zi Xuan 7'; Aarodh S.d. Sai 27'; Lewis Sun Hongwen 29'; Hadif Anaqi (yellow card) 49'		Zayden Ng Sheng Xun 6'; Wesley Ho Tze Hyean (yellow card) 54'; Gabriel Ng Yun Jun (yellow card) 61'	Stadium: Kallang Football Hub

23 August 2026 2	Sailors DC (Singapore)	4–0	(Singapore) Lion City Sailors	Woodlands
	Lewis Sun Hongwen 12', 44'; Thierry Amyza Helmi 31'; Josh Lim Jun Rui 72'			Stadium: Singapore Sports School

30 August 2026 3	Sailors DC (Singapore)	1–0	Singapore Sports School	Woodlands
	Haikel Noreffendy 75'	Report	Evaan Shafiee (yellow card) 30'	Stadium: Singapore Sports School

6 September 2026 4	Sailors DC (Singapore)	1–1	(Singapore) Geylang International	Woodlands
	Lucas Tok Yan Kit (yellow card) 24'; Nidhish Vijayakumar (yellow card) 32'	Report	Eugene Lin 80' (pen.) (yellow card) 35'; Ryzan Sollihin (yellow card) 51'; Lut Hanif (yellow card) 65'	Stadium: Singapore Sports School

13 September 2026 5	Sailors DC (Singapore)	2–1	(Singapore) Balestier Khalsa	Woodlands
	Haikel Noreffendy 41' (yellow card) 41'; Hugo Joanny 74'; Tobias Fang Yile (yellow card) 76'	Report	Sean Tan Yu Hern Sean 51'; Zachary Persaud (yellow card) 48'	Stadium: Singapore Sports School

20 September 2026 6	Sailors DC (Singapore)	6–1	(Singapore) GFA Japan	Woodlands
	Lucas Ling Zi Xuan 2' (pen.), 15', 37'; Lucas Tok Yan Kit 12'; Xander Tan Yang Xuan 13'; Nidhish Vijayakumar 20'	Report	Homma Dan 65'	Stadium: Singapore Sports School

27 September 2026 7	Sailors DC (Singapore)	1–0	(Singapore) Euro Asia	Woodlands
	Hugo Joanny 34'	Report		Stadium: Singapore Sports School

4 October 2026 8	Sailors DC (Singapore)	–	(Singapore) National Development Centre	Kallang
				Stadium: Kallang Football Hub

11 October 2026 9	Sailors DC (Singapore)	–	(Singapore) Lion City Sailors	Woodlands
				Stadium: Singapore Sports School

Pos	Team	Pld	W	D	L	GF	GA	GD	Pts	Qualification or relegation
1	Sailors DC	7	6	1	0	18	4	+14	19	League champions
2	National Development Centre	7	4	0	3	14	9	+5	12	
3	Balestier Khalsa	7	3	2	2	18	9	+9	11	
4	Geylang International	5	3	2	0	13	4	+9	11	
5	EuroAsia FC	7	3	1	3	12	11	+1	10	
6	Singapore Sports School	6	2	0	4	12	10	+2	6	
7	Lion City Sailors	6	2	0	4	16	15	+1	6	Relegated to 2026 Stage 2 Div 2
8	Global Football Academy	7	0	0	7	10	51	−41	0	Relegated to 2026 Stage 2 Div 2

Updated to match(es) played on 27 September 2026. Source: Singapore Youth League

== Competition (U14) ==
Win Draw Loss

=== 2026 ===
2026 Division 1 (Stage 1) League matches & table

14 February 2026 1	Lion City Sailors (Singapore)	7–1	(Singapore) National Development Centre	Kallang
				Stadium: Kallang Football Hub

28 February 2026 2	Lion City Sailors (Singapore)	8–1	(Singapore) Geylang International	Kallang
				Stadium: Kallang Football Hub

7 March 2026 3	Lion City Sailors (Singapore)	6–0	Singapore Sports School	Woodlands
				Stadium: Singapore Sports School

28 March 2026 4	Lion City Sailors (Singapore)	12–0	(Singapore) Development Centre AFA	Choa Chu Kang
				Stadium: Regent Secondary School

16 May 2026 5 (Rescheduled)	Lion City Sailors (Singapore)	10–0	(Singapore) SG7 Soccer Academic	Jurong West
				Stadium: Westwood Secondary School

18 April 2026 6	Lion City Sailors (Singapore)	5–0	(Singapore) Kids1Kick Football Academy	Jurong West
				Stadium: Westwood Secondary School

25 April 2026 7	Lion City Sailors (Singapore)	17–0	(Spain) Spanish Sportive Club Asia	Serangoon
				Stadium: Serangoon Garden Secondary School

2 May 2026 8	Lion City Sailors (Singapore)	12–1	(Singapore) Albirex SG FA	Jurong West
				Stadium: Westwood Secondary School

9 May 2026 9	Lion City Sailors (Singapore)	3–1	(Singapore) Tanjong Pagar United	Boon Lay
				Stadium: Boon Lay Secondary School

Pos	Team	Pld	W	D	L	GF	GA	GD	Pts	Qualification or relegation
1	Lion City Sailors	9	9	0	0	80	4	+76	27	League champion
2	Singapore Sports School	9	7	1	1	62	12	+50	22	
3	Geylang International	9	7	0	2	45	15	+30	21	
4	(Singapore) National Development Centre	9	6	0	3	33	23	+10	18	Withdrew from the league after playing 2 matches
5	Tanjong Pagar United	9	5	1	3	25	13	+12	16	
6	SG7 Soccer Academic	9	4	0	5	9	19	−10	12	
7	Development Centre AFA	9	3	0	6	13	39	−26	9	
8	Kids1Kick Football Academy	9	2	0	7	13	29	−16	6	
9	FC Jurong	9	0	1	8	12	49	−37	1	Relegated to 2026 Division 2
10	(Spain) Spanish Sportive Club Asia	9	0	1	8	10	99	−89	1	Relegated to 2026 Division 2

Updated to match(es) played on 30 May 2026. Source: Singapore Youth League

2026 SYL League matches & table

22 August 2026 1	Lion City Sailors (Singapore)	15–0	(Singapore) FC Jurong	Woodlands
				Stadium: Singapore Sports School

29 August 2026 2	Lion City Sailors (Singapore)	1–1	Singapore Sports School	Woodlands
				Stadium: Singapore Sports School

12 September 2026 3	Lion City Sailors (Singapore)	7–0	(Singapore) Development Centre AFA	Queenstown
				Stadium: Queenstown Secondary School

7 November 2026 4 (Rescheduled)	Lion City Sailors (Singapore)	–	(Singapore) SG7 Soccer Academic	Woodlands
				Stadium: Singapore Sports School

26 September 2026 5	Lion City Sailors (Singapore)	–	(Singapore) Kids1Kick Football Academy	Woodlands
				Stadium: Singapore Sports School

17 October 2026 6	Lion City Sailors (Singapore)	–	(Singapore) Spanish Sportive Club Asia	Queenstown
				Stadium: Queenstown Secondary School

24 October 2026 7	Lion City Sailors (Singapore)	–	(Singapore) Tanjong Pagar United	Jurong East
				Stadium: Westwood Secondary School

31 October 2026 8	Lion City Sailors (Singapore)	–	(Singapore) Geylang International	Woodlands
				Stadium: Singapore Sports School

Pos	Team	Pld	W	D	L	GF	GA	GD	Pts	Qualification or relegation
1	Singapore Sports School	4	3	1	0	24	1	+23	10	League champion
2	Tanjong Pagar United	4	3	1	0	16	5	+11	10	
3	Geylang International	4	3	1	0	16	6	+10	10	
4	Lion City Sailors	3	2	1	0	23	1	+22	7	
5	SG7 Soccer Academic	3	1	0	2	2	4	−2	3	
6	Development Centre AFA	4	1	0	3	10	19	−9	3	
7	FC Jurong	4	1	0	3	10	33	−23	3	
8	Kids1Kick Football Academy	2	0	0	2	1	7	−6	0	
9	(Spain) Spanish Sportive Club Asia	3	0	0	3	0	26	−26	0	Relegated to 2026 Division 2

Updated to match(es) played on 23 September 2026. Source: Singapore Youth League

== Competition (U13) ==
Win Draw Loss

=== 2026 ===
2026 Division 1 (Stage 1) League matches & table

15 February 2026 1	Lion City Sailors (Singapore)	3–7	(Singapore) BG Tampines Rovers	Serangoon
				Stadium: Serangoon Garden Secondary School

1 March 2026 2	Lion City Sailors (Singapore)	9–0	(Singapore) Eastern Thunder	Sengkang
				Stadium: Sengkang Secondary School

8 March 2026 3	Lion City Sailors (Singapore)	2–0	(Singapore) National Development Centre	Kallang
				Stadium: Kallang Football Hub

17 May 2026 4 (Rescheduled)	Lion City Sailors (Singapore)	5–0	Singapore Sports School	Woodlands
				Stadium: Singapore Sports School

12 April 2026 5	Lion City Sailors (Singapore)	6–0	(Singapore) Flair Football Academy	Sengkang
				Stadium: Sengkang Secondary School

24 May 2026 6 (Rescheduled)	Lion City Sailors (Singapore)	5–3	(Singapore) Island City	Kallang
				Stadium: Kallang Football Hub

26 April 2026 7	Lion City Sailors (Singapore)	3–2	(Singapore) Hougang United	Serangoon
				Stadium: Serangoon Garden Secondary School

5 July 2026 8	Lion City Sailors (Singapore)	3–0	(Singapore) Balestier Khalsa	Kallang
				Stadium: Kallang Football Hub

10 May 2026 9	Lion City Sailors (Singapore)	1–5	(Malaysia) Johor Darul Ta’zim	Kallang
				Stadium: Kallang Football Hub

Pos	Team	Pld	W	D	L	GF	GA	GD	Pts	Qualification or relegation
1	BG Tampines Rovers	9	9	0	0	70	6	+64	27	Promote to Singapore Premier Youth League
2	(Malaysia) Johor Darul Ta'zim	9	8	0	1	79	4	+75	24	Promote to Singapore Premier Youth League
3	Singapore Sports School	9	7	0	2	43	11	+32	21	Promote to Singapore Premier Youth League
4	Island City	9	6	0	3	31	33	−2	18	Promote to Singapore Premier Youth League
5	Lion City Sailors	9	5	0	4	30	24	+6	15	Promote to Singapore Premier Youth League
6	National Development Centre	9	3	1	5	19	21	−2	10	
7	Hougang United	9	3	1	5	23	31	−8	10	
8	Balestier Khalsa	9	2	0	7	18	34	−16	6	
9	Flair Football Academy	9	1	0	8	16	50	−34	3	
10	Eastern Thunder	9	0	0	9	1	116	−115	0	Withdrew from 2025 Stage 2 Div 2

Updated to match(es) played on 31 July 2026. Source: Singapore Youth League

2026 SPYL League matches & table

Lion City Sailors

16 August 2026 1	Lion City Sailors (Singapore)	5–2	(Singapore) Sailors DC	Mattar
	Ahyan Abdul Rahim 9', 73'; Ryler Pang 18'; Shaqeel Bilal Khan 31'; Ezra Mykhayl 57'; Adrian Adam 65'; Farish Nabil (yellow card) 7'; Seth Lee Ka Weng (yellow card) 10'; Julian Mark Scully (yellow card) 75'		Takumi Watanabe 35' (pen.); Afshan Rayn (red card) 26'	Stadium: Mattar Road Pitch 3

23 August 2026 2	Lion City Sailors (Singapore)	3–3	Singapore Sports School	Mattar
	Arjun Hooda 24', 32'; Khalid Saifullah 27'; Khaliesh Wafi (yellow card) 16'		Aniq Naufal 30', 42'; Syed Umair 63'; Adyan Rayees (yellow card) 66'	Stadium: Mattar Road Pitch 3

30 August 2026 3	Lion City Sailors (Singapore)	5–2	(Singapore) Island City	Mattar
	Aniq Aqish 36'; Arjun Hooda 37'; Ilhan Nawfal 40'; Ahyan Rahim 55'; Seth Lee Ka Weng 60'; Ezra Mykhayl 70'	Report	Victor Hu 1', 11'	Stadium: Mattar Road Pitch 3

23 September 2026 4 (Rescheduled)	Lion City Sailors (Singapore)	0–4	(Malaysia) Johor Darul Ta’zim	Mattar
		Report	Iqbal Norhisham 17'; Aamir Saddeq 27', 48'; Noor Iman Zailani 53'	Stadium: Mattar Road Pitch 3

13 September 2026 5	Lion City Sailors (Singapore)	3–1	(Singapore) JSSL	Mattar
	Farish Nabil 8'; Ahyan Rahim 32'; Ilman Hafidz 37'	Report	Theo Gigliucci 25'	Stadium: Mattar Road Pitch 3

20 September 2026 6	Lion City Sailors (Singapore)	1–4	(Singapore) Tampines Rovers	Mattar
	Gideon Chua Meng Han 63' (yellow card) 69'; Arjun Hooda (yellow card) 64'; Shaqeel Bilal (yellow card) 72'	Report	Brody Boicey 13'; James Forster 36', 75'; Madhava Prashant 37'; John Watson (yellow card) 9' (yellow-red card)	Stadium: Mattar Road Pitch 3

27 September 2026 7	Lion City Sailors (Singapore)	4–0	(Singapore) Euro Soocer Academy	Mattar
	Arjun Hooda 43' (yellow card) 46'; Ilhan Nawfal 53', 65'; Julian Mark Scully 70'	Report		Stadium: Mattar Road Pitch 3

4 October 2026 8	Lion City Sailors (Singapore)	3–0	(Singapore) Sailors DC	Mattar
	Daito Ono 27' (pen.); Dameer Harith 37'; Ryan Qushairy 70'	Report	Bennett Zink (yellow card) 5'; Arman Ziqry (yellow card) 32'	Stadium: Mattar Road Pitch 3

2026 9 (Rescheduled)	Lion City Sailors (Singapore)	–	Singapore Sports School	Mattar
				Stadium: Mattar Road Pitch 3

2026 10 (Rescheduled)	Lion City Sailors (Singapore)	–	(Singapore) Island City	Mattar
				Stadium: Mattar Road Pitch 3

2026 11 (Rescheduled)	Lion City Sailors (Singapore)	–	(Malaysia) Johor Darul Ta’zim	Mattar
				Stadium: Mattar Road Pitch 3

1 November 2026 12	Lion City Sailors (Singapore)	–	(Singapore) JSSL	Mattar
				Stadium: Mattar Road Pitch 3

15 November 2026 13	Lion City Sailors (Singapore)	–	(Singapore) Tampines Rovers	Mattar
				Stadium: Mattar Road Pitch 3

22 November 2026 14	Lion City Sailors (Singapore)	–	(Singapore) Euro Soocer Academy	Mattar
				Stadium: Mattar Road Pitch 3

Sailors Development Centre

16 August 2026 1	Sailors DC (Singapore)	2–5	(Singapore) Lion City Sailors	Mattar
	Takumi Watanabe 35' (pen.); Afshan Rayn (red card) 26'		Ahyan Abdul Rahim 9', 73'; Ryler Pang 18'; Shaqeel Bilal Khan 31'; Ezra Mykhayl 57'; Adrian Adam 65'; Farish Nabil (yellow card) 7'; Seth Lee Ka Weng (yellow card) 10'; Julian Mark Scully (yellow card) 75'	Stadium: Mattar Road Pitch 3

23 August 2026 2	Sailors DC (Singapore)	0–0	(Singapore) JSSL	Woodlands
		Report	Nathanael Zeng (yellow card) 63'	Stadium: Regent Secondary School

30 August 2026 3	Sailors DC (Singapore)	2–4	Singapore Sports School	Woodlands
	Rayyan Ridwan 18'; Bennett Zink 64'	Report	Adel Darwish 28'; Syed Umair Ahmad 30'; Aniq Naufal 40'; Marley Chiu Yue Mok 53'	Stadium: Regent Secondary School

6 September 2026 4	Sailors DC (Singapore)	2–0	(Singapore) Euro Soccer Academy	Woodlands
	Lucas Daniel Morrow 35'; Bennett Zink 68'	Report		Stadium: Regent Secondary School

13 September 2026 5	Sailors DC (Singapore)	3–5	(Singapore) Tampines Rovers	Woodlands
	Tetje Hinkelmann 16'; Rayyan Ridwan 22'; Zaydan Zailani 25'	Report	Christian Kimi Raudszus 6'; James Forster 15'; Yoshi Ozasa 40'; Brody Boicey 50'; Madhava Prashant 68'	Stadium: Regent Secondary School

25 October 2026 6 (Rescheduled)	Sailors DC (Singapore)	–	(Malaysia) Johor Darul Ta'zim	Woodlands
				Stadium: Regent Secondary School

27 September 2026 7	Sailors DC (Singapore)	3–1	(Singapore) Island City	Woodlands
	Lucas Daniel Morrow 18'; Tetje Hinkelmann 35'; Bennett Zink 45'	Report	Felix Da Strang 2'; Mishaal Ihsan (yellow card) 10'; Lee Byeong-yun (yellow card) 55'	Stadium: Regent Secondary School

4 October 2026 8	Sailors DC (Singapore)	0–3	(Singapore) Lion City Sailors	Mattar
	Bennett Zink (yellow card) 5'; Arman Ziqry (yellow card) 32'	Report	Daito Ono 27' (pen.); Dameer Harith 37'; Ryan Qushairy 70'	Stadium: Mattar Road Pitch 3

11 October 2026 9	Sailors DC (Singapore)	–	(Singapore) JSSL	Woodlands
				Stadium: Regent Secondary School

18 October 2026 10	Sailors DC (Singapore)	–	Singapore Sport School	Woodlands
				Stadium: Regent Secondary School

25 October 2026 11	Sailors DC (Singapore)	–	(Singapore) Euro Soccer Academy	Woodlands
				Stadium: Regent Secondary School

1 November 2026 12	Sailors DC (Singapore)	–	(Singapore) Tampines Rovers	Woodlands
				Stadium: Regent Secondary School

15 November 2026 13	Sailors DC (Singapore)	–	(Malaysia) Johor Darul Ta'zim	Woodlands
				Stadium: Regent Secondary School

22 November 2026 14	Sailors DC (Singapore)	–	(Singapore) Island City	Woodlands
				Stadium: Regent Secondary School

Pos	Team	Pld	W	D	L	GF	GA	GD	Pts	Qualification or relegation
1	Tampines Rovers	7	6	1	0	28	9	+19	19	League champion
2	Lion City Sailors	7	4	1	2	21	16	+5	13	
3	(Malaysia) Johor Darul Ta'zim	5	4	0	1	21	4	+17	12	
4	Singapore Sports School	6	2	2	2	12	14	−2	8	
5	Sailors DC	6	2	1	3	12	15	−3	7	
6	Island City	7	2	1	4	15	28	−13	7	
7	JSSL	6	0	2	4	5	15	−10	2	Relegated to 2026 Stage 2 Div 2
8	Euro Soocer Academy	6	0	2	4	8	21	−13	2	Relegated to 2026 Stage 2 Div 2

Updated to match(es) played on 30 September 2026. Source: Singapore Youth League
