= 2026–27 ASEAN Club Championship knockout stage =

Southeast Asia premier club football tournament

The 2026–27 ASEAN Club Championship knockout stage will begin on 19 May with the quarter-finals and end on 30 June 2027 with the final to decide the champions of the 2026–27 ASEAN Club Championship. A total of eight teams will compete in the knockout stage.

== Qualified teams ==
The knockout stage involves the eight teams which qualify as winners to fourth place of each of the two groups in the group stage.

Group	Winners	Runners-up	Third place	Fourth place
A				
B				

== Format ==
Each tie in the knockout stage, apart from the quarter-finals, will be played over two legs, with each team playing one leg at home. The team that scores more goals on aggregate over the two legs will advance to the next round. If the aggregate score is level, then 30 minutes of extra time will be played (the away goals rule is not applied). If the score is still level at the end of extra time, the winners will be decided by a penalty shoot-out.

== Schedule ==
The schedule is as follows.

Round	First leg	Second leg
Quarter-finals	19–20 May 2027	
Semi-finals	27 May 2027	3 June 2027
Final	17 June 2027	30 June 2027

== Bracket ==
Quarter-finals
19 May
Group A runner-up
Group B third place
20 May
Group B winner
Group A fourth place
20 May
Group B runner-up
Group A third place
19 May
Group A winner
Group B fourth place

Semi-finals
Winner QF3
Winner QF2
Winner QF4
Winner QF1

Final
Winner SF1
Winner SF2

== Quarter-finals ==
=== Summary ===
The matches will be played between 19 and 20 May 2027.

Team 1	Score	Team 2
Group A winner	19 May	Group B fourth place
Group A runner-up	19 May	Group B third place
Group B winner	20 May	Group A fourth place
Group B runner-up	20 May	Group A third place

=== Matches ===
19 May 2027
--:--

Group A winner	v	Group B fourth place

TBD
19 May 2027
--:--

Group A runner-up	v	Group B third place

TBD
20 May 2027
--:--

Group B winner	v	Group A fourth place

TBD
20 May 2027
--:--

Group B runner-up	v	Group A third place

TBD

== Semi-finals ==
=== Summary ===
The first legs will be played on 27 May, and the second legs will be played on 3 June 2027.

Team 1	Agg.	Team 2	1st leg	2nd leg
Winner QF3		Winner QF2	27 May	3 June
Winner QF4		Winner QF1	27 May	3 June

=== Matches ===
27 May 2027
--:--

Winner QF3	v	Winner QF2

TBD
3 June 2027
--:--

Winner QF2	v	Winner QF3

TBD

27 May 2027
--:--

Winner QF4	v	Winner QF1

TBD
3 June 2027
--:--

Winner QF1	v	Winner QF4

TBD

== Final ==
The final will be played between 17 and 30 June 2027. The two venues will be pre-determined on rotation basis based on the winners of the semi-finals.

Team 1	Agg.	Team 2	1st leg	2nd leg
Winner SF1		Winner SF2	17 Jun	30 Jun

17 June 2027
--:--

Winner SF1	v	Winner SF2

TBD

30 June 2027
--:--

Winner SF2	v	Winner SF1

TBD
