= Victor Aznar =

Brazilian footballer (born 2002)

Personal information
- Full name: Victor Wehbi Aznar Ussen
- Date of birth: 17 October 2002 (age 24)
- Place of birth: São Paulo, Brazil
- Height: 1.92 m (6 ft 4 in)
- Position: Goalkeeper

Team information
- Current team: Lion City Sailors
- Number: 1

Youth career
- 2012–2016: Corinthians
- 2018: Taboão da Serra
- 2019–2021: Hellas Verona

Senior career*
Years	Team	Apps	(Gls)
2021–2025	Cádiz B	76	(0)
2023–2026	Cádiz	36	(0)
2026–	Lion City Sailors	2	(0)
- * Club domestic league appearances and goals as of 25 October 2026

Victor Wehbi Aznar Ussen (born 17 October 2002) is a Brazilian professional footballer who plays as a goalkeeper for Singapore Premier League club Lion City Sailors.

== Career ==
Born in São Paulo, Aznar represented the youth categories of Corinthians and Taboão da Serra before joining Hellas Verona in January 2019, after a trial period. On 29 July 2021, after finishing his formation, he signed a two-year contract with Cádiz CF, being initially assigned to the reserves in Segunda División RFEF.

Initially a backup to Juan Flere, Aznar renewed his contract with Cádiz until 2027 on 18 January 2023. He made his first team debut on 7 December, starting in a 2–1 away loss to Arandina CF, the season's Copa del Rey.

Aznar subsequently became an undisputed starter for the B's, and made his professional debut on 25 May 2025, playing the full 90 minutes in a 4–0 Segunda División home routing of SD Huesca. He was promoted to the first team ahead of the 2025–26 campaign, after the departure of José Antonio Caro, and quickly established himself as a first-choice ahead of David Gil.

On 13 August 2026, Aznar was transferred to Singapore Premier League club Lion City Sailors.

== Career statistics ==
As of match played 31 May 2026

Appearances and goals by club, season and competition
Club	Season	League			Cup		Other		Total	
Club	Season	Division	Apps	Goals	Apps	Goals	Apps	Goals	Apps	Goals
Cádiz B	2021–22	Segunda Federación	15	0	—		—		15	0
Cádiz B	2022–23	Segunda Federación	15	0	—		—		15	0
Cádiz B	2023–24	Segunda Federación	20	0	—		—		20	0
Cádiz B	2024–25	Segunda Federación	26	0	—		—		26	0
Cádiz B	Total		76	0	—		—		76	0
Cádiz	2023–24	La Liga	0	0	1	0	—		1	0
Cádiz	2024–25	Segunda División	2	0	0	0	—		2	0
Cádiz	2025–26	Segunda División	34	0	0	0	—		34	0
Cádiz	Total		36	0	1	0	—		37	0
Career total			112	0	1	0	0	0	113	0
