= 2027 ASEAN Club Championship final =

Association football match

- Event: ASEAN Club Championship
Winner SF1	Winner SF2
(N/A)	(N/A)

First leg
Winner SF1	Winner SF2
- Date: 17 June 2027
- Venue: TBD

Second leg
Winner SF2	Winner SF1
- Date: 30 June 2027
- Venue: TBD

The 2027 ASEAN Club Championship final will be the final match of the 2026–27 ASEAN Club Championship, the 6th season of Southeast Asia's premier club football tournament organised by the ASEAN Football Federation (AFF). It was played on 17 June for the first leg and 30 June 2026 for the second leg, between 2 semi-final winners.

The winners will automatically qualify to the group stage of the 2027–28 ASEAN Club Championship.

== Venue ==
The 2 venues were pre-determined on rotation basis based on the winners of the semi-finals.

== Match ==
=== Details ===
Team 1	Agg.	Team 2	1st leg	2nd leg
Winner SF1		Winner SF2	17 Jun	30 Jun

==== First leg ====
17 June 2027
--:--

Winner SF1	v	Winner SF2

TBD

Match rules

- 90 minutes
- Maximum of twelve named substitutes
- Maximum of five substitutions
- Maximum of three substitution opportunities

==== Second leg ====
30 June 2027
--:--

Winner SF2	v	Winner SF1

TBD

Match rules

- 90 minutes
- 30 minutes of extra time if necessary
- Penalty shoot-out if scores still level
- Maximum of twelve named substitutes
- Maximum of five substitutions, with a sixth allowed in extra time
- Maximum of three substitution opportunities, with a fourth allowed in extra time
