= 2026–27 Lion City Sailors FC season =

Lion City Sailors
2026–27 season
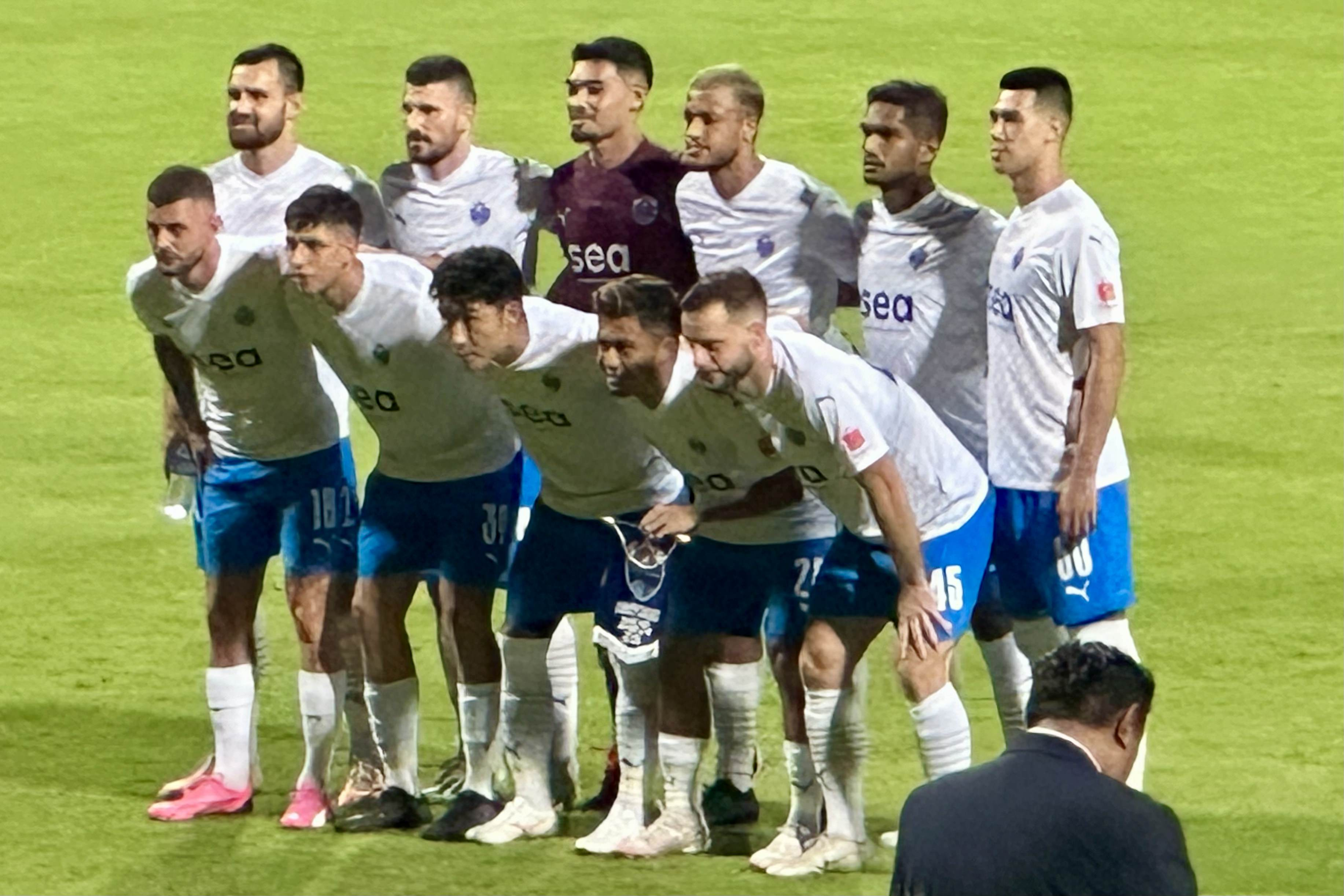
- Match between Lion City Sailors and Johor Darul Ta'zim
- Owner: Sea Limited
- Chairman: Forrest Li
- Head coach: (Spain) Jesús Casas (until 1 September) (Spain) Varo Moreno (interim; 1 September – 12 September) (England) Mark Jackson (from 13 September)
- Stadium: Jalan Besar Stadium; Bishan Stadium
- Top goalscorer: League: TBD; All: TBD
Home colours	Away colours

The 2026–27 season is Lion City Sailors' 31st consecutive season in the Singapore Premier League and the 7th season since privatising from Home United. In addition to the Singapore Premier League, Lion City Sailors are also participating in the Singapore Cup, AFC Champions League Two, ASEAN Club Championship, and the Singapore Community Shield.

== Kits ==
Home	Away	Home alt.^{1}	Home alt.^{2}
Goalkeeper; Home		Goalkeeper; Away

== Squad ==
=== Singapore Premier League ===
As of 2 August 2026

Squad No.	Name	Nationality	Date of birth (age)	Previous club	Contract since	Contract end
Goalkeepers
13	Adib Azahari	(Singapore)	9 March 1998 (age 28)	(Singapore) Young Lions	2020	2027
25	Ivan Sušak	(Croatia)	6 October 1997 (age 29)	(Croatia) Slaven Belupo	2025	2027
1	Victor Aznar	(Brazil)	17 October 2002 (age 24)	(Spain) Cádiz CF	2026	2029
Defenders
2	Jorge Karseladze	(Georgia (country))	18 March 2005 (age 21)	(Portugal) Rio Ave	2026	2028
3	Hugo Gomes	(Brazil)	4 January 1995 (age 31)	(Vietnam) Cong An Hanoi	2026	2028
4	Toni Datković	(Croatia)	6 November 1993 (age 33)	(Spain) Albacete	2024	2027
5	Lionel Tan	(Singapore)	5 June 1997 (age 29)	(Singapore) Hougang United	2023	2029
14	Hariss Harun (captain)	(Singapore)	9 November 1990 (age 36)	(Malaysia) Johor Darul Ta'zim	2021	2027
18	Ryhan Stewart	(Singapore)	15 February 2000 (age 26)	(Thailand) Kanchanaburi Power	2026	2029
20	Nur Adam Abdullah	(Singapore)	13 April 2001 (age 25)	(Singapore) Young Lions	2021	2029
26	Bailey Wright (vice-captain)	(Australia)	28 July 1992 (age 34)	(England) Sunderland	2023	2027
29	Diogo Costa	(Portugal)	27 July 2003 (age 23)	(Portugal) Famalicão	2025	2030
Midfielders
6	Tsiy-William Ndenge	(Germany)	13 June 1997 (age 29)	(Switzerland) Grasshopper	2025	2027
10	Bart Ramselaar	(Netherlands)	29 June 1996 (age 30)	(Netherlands) Utrecht	2024	2028
15	Song Ui-young	(Singapore)	8 November 1993 (age 33)	(Indonesia) Persebaya Surabaya	2024	2027
16	Hami Syahin	(Singapore)	16 December 1998 (age 27)	(Singapore) Young Lions	2019	2027
46	Kyoga Nakamura	(Singapore)	25 April 1996 (age 30)	(Thailand) Bangkok United	2026	2028
24	Giovanni Haag	(France)	30 May 2000 (age 26)	(Germany) Fortuna Düsseldorf	2026	2028
22	Nur Muhammad Asis	(Singapore)	4 March 2004 (age 22)	(Portugal) FC Vizela U23 (P2)	2022	2029
Forwards
7	Shawal Anuar	(Singapore)	29 April 1991 (age 35)	(Singapore) Hougang United	2023	2027
9	Lennart Thy	(Germany)	25 February 1992 (age 34)	(Netherlands) PEC Zwolle	2024	2027
11	Glenn Kweh	(Singapore)	26 March 2000 (age 26)	(Singapore) Tampines Rovers	2026	2028
12	Antonio Mance	(Croatia)	7 August 1995 (age 31)	(Qatar) Umm Salal	2026	2028
17	Ilhan Fandi	(Singapore)	8 November 2002 (age 24)	(Thailand) Buriram United	2026	2028
19	Farhan Zulkifli	(Singapore)	10 November 2002 (age 24)	(Singapore) Hougang United	2026	2028
23	Matthias Phaëton	(Guadeloupe)	8 January 2000 (age 26)	(Switzerland) Zürich	2026	2029
31	Abdul Rasaq	(Singapore)	16 June 2001 (age 25)	(Singapore) Young Lions	2023	2027
30	Bobby Adekanye	(Netherlands)	14 September 1999 (age 27)	(Turkey) Manisa F.K.	2026	2028
Players on loan / NS
12	Benjamin Žerak	(Slovenia)	14 December 2006 (age 19)	(Singapore) Young Lions	2025	2027
80	Nathan Mao	(Singapore)	26 March 2008 (age 18)	(Singapore) Young Lions	2022	2027
	Khairin Nadim	(Singapore)	8 May 2004 (age 22)	(Singapore) Hougang United	2026	2029
	Jonan Tan	(Singapore)	27 June 2006 (age 20)	(Croatia) NK Dugopolje	2022	2029
Players who left mid-season

Remarks:
^{FP U21} These players are registered as U21 foreign players.

=== Singapore Premier League 2 ===
As of 24 Aug 2026

Squad No.	Name	Nationality	Date of birth (age)	Previous club	Contract since	Contract end
Goalkeepers
65	Ilhan Rezal Hady	(Singapore)	19 March 2010 (age 16)	(Singapore) Young Lions	2026	2027
67	Issac Goh Jun Yang	(Singapore)	5 June 2007 (age 19)	(Singapore) Young Lions	2026	2027
82	Arnav Anand	(India) (Singapore)	24 February 2010 (age 16)	(Singapore) Lion City Sailors U17	2022	2027
90	Naqeeb Syazani Shawaluddin	(Singapore)	23 August 2010 (age 16)	(Singapore) Lion City Sailors U17	2023	2027
Defenders
52	Aaryan Azraqi Hermi	(Singapore)	24 February 2009 (age 17)	(Singapore) Young Lions	2026	2027
54	Aqil M. Khusni	(Singapore)	23 April 2004 (age 22)	(Singapore) Young Lions	2026	2027
55	Adrian Jaccard	(Singapore)	30 October 2006 (age 20)	(Singapore) Tampines Rovers U21	2026	2027
57	Caden Pereira	(Singapore)	3 February 2010 (age 16)	(Singapore) Lion City Sailors U19	2022	2027
64	Tyler Tan	(Singapore)	7 July 2010 (age 16)	(Singapore) Lion City Sailors U19	2023	2027
68	Caleb Leo Chin Hee	(Singapore)	28 March 2010 (age 16)	(Singapore) Lion City Sailors U19	2022	2027
69	Aniq Tiryaq	(Singapore)	10 October 2006 (age 20)	(Singapore) Lion City Sailors U17	2021	2027
73	Algirdas Karlonas	(Lithuania)	21 January 2009 (age 17)	(Singapore) Hougang United	2026	2027
75	Shlok Ranadive	(Singapore)	10 June 2010 (age 16)	(Singapore) Lion City Sailors U17	2025	2027
76	Issac Saw Tian Zhi	(Singapore) (Malaysia)	2009	(Singapore) Lion City Sailors U17	2023	2027
81	Zamir Nasri	(Singapore)	6 March 2009 (age 17)	(Singapore) National Development Center	2026	2027
Midfielders
51	Adam Faizal	(Singapore)	1 December 2009 (age 16)	(Singapore) Young Lions	2026	2027
53	Aryan Bahadur Chhetri	(Singapore)	24 February 2005 (age 21)	(Singapore) Lion City Sailors U17	2022	2027
60	Yasir Nizamudin	(Singapore)	21 January 2005 (age 21)	(Singapore) Lion City Sailors U21	2022	2027
63	Ahmad Danial	(Singapore)	16 November 2005 (age 20)	(Singapore) Tanjong Pagar United U21	2025	2026
66	Hugh Alexander Lobsey	(Australia) (Singapore)	24 March 2009 (age 17)	(Singapore) Balestier Khalsa	2026	2027
70	Izzan Rifqi	(Singapore)	4 March 2010 (age 16)	(Singapore) Young Lions	2026	2027
71	Yazid Rizal Rais	(Singapore)	16 March 2006 (age 20)	(Singapore) Young Lions	2026	2027
72	Aaditya Aprameya Rao	(India)	12 March 2009 (age 17)	(Singapore) Tampines Rovers	2026	2027
74	Iman Naqib Idris	(Singapore)		(Singapore) Lion City Sailors U17	2024	2027
78	Tan Yu Bin	(Singapore)		(Singapore) Lion City Sailors U17	2024	2027
79	Aiman Eszuan	(Singapore)	1 December 2009 (age 16)	(Singapore) Young Lions	2026	2027
80	Darwisy Fitri Johari	(Singapore)	18 February 2009 (age 17)	(Singapore) Young Lions	2026	2027
Strikers
56	Danish Irfan Abdul Hazin	(Singapore)	6 May 2009 (age 17)	(Singapore) Young Lions	2026	2027
58	Namsang Rai	(Nepal)	9 March 2006 (age 20)	(Singapore) Hougang United U21	2025	2027
59	Jasper Chen Hong-An	(Chinese Taipei)	19 April 2009 (age 17)	(Singapore) Tampines Rovers	2026	2027
62	Izrafil Yusof	(Singapore)	27 January 2004 (age 22)	(Singapore) Tanjong Pagar United	2022	2027
77	Aufa Basyar	(Singapore)		(Singapore) Lion City Sailors U17	2023	2027
Players on loan / NS
Players who left mid-season

== Staff ==
The following list displays the coaching and administrative staff of Lion City Sailors FC:

Management Team

Position	Name
Chairman	(Singapore) Forrest Li
CEO	(Singapore) Bruce Liang
Sporting Director	(Serbia) Luka Lalić
Technical Director	(Serbia) Luka Lalić
General Manager	(Singapore) Tan Li Yu
Head of Recruitment	(Croatia) Igor Cerina

First Team

Position	Name
Team Manager (SPL)	(Vietnam) Hương Trần
Team Manager (WPL)	(Singapore) Jenny Tan
Head Women Program	(Singapore) Yeong Sheau Shyan (Note: Appointed as coach of U16 Girls National Team for Lion City Cup)
Head Coach	(England) Mark Jackson
Head Coach (Women)	(Singapore) Daniel Ong
Assistant Coach (First Team)	(Wales) Cameron Toshack
Assistant Coach (Women)	(Singapore) Izz Haziq Izan
Goalkeeping Coach	(Spain) David Valle
Goalkeeping Coach (Women)	(Singapore) Joey Sim
Fitness Coach	(Spain) Manuel Salado
Head Strength & Conditioning (S&C) Coach	(Portugal) Miguel Bragança
Rehabilitation Coach	(Netherlands) Niels Van Sundert
Performance Coach	(Singapore) He Qi Xiang
Sports Scientist	(Netherlands) Mike Kerklaan (Portugal) André Gonçalves Mendes
Video Analyst	(Spain) Varo Moreno
Match Analyst	(Singapore) Daniel Lau
Head of Logistics	(Singapore) Zahir Taufeek
Sports Cordinator	(Singapore) Masrezal Bin Mashuri

SPL2 Team

Team Manager (SPL2)	(Singapore) William Phang
Head Coach	(Portugal) Bruno Jeremias
Asst Coach	
Goalkeeping Coach	(Singapore) Chua Lye Heng
Performance Coach (Under-21)	(Brazil) Vital Ribeiro Damasceno
Individual Coach (Under-21)	(Portugal) Dinando
Sports Scientist (Under-21)	(Spain) Santiago Izquierdo
Match Analyst (Under-21)	(Singapore) Gautam Selvamany
Video Analyst (Under-21)	(Spain) Jesus Remacha

Academy

Position	Name
Head of Academy	(Portugal) Nuno Pereira
Head of DC Team	
Head Coach (Mattar Sailors)	(Singapore) Jasni Hatta
Under-17 Head Coach & Academy Coordinator	(Singapore) Ashraf Ariffin (Note: Appointed as coach of U16 Boys National Team for Lion City Cup)
Under-15 Head Coach	(Netherlands) Wiebe de Haan
Under-14 Head Coach	(Singapore) Khairil Asyraf
Under-13 Head Coach	(Singapore) Hamqaamal Shah
Under-12 Head Coach	(Portugal) Francisco Couto
Under-11 Head Coach	(Singapore) Kevin Tan
Under-10 Head Coach	
Head of Youth Goalkeeper Coach	(Singapore) Shahril Jantan
Goalkeeping Coach (U17)	(Singapore) Yeo Jun Guang
Goalkeeping Coach (U15)	
Goalkeeping Coach (U13)	(Singapore) Fadly Tamiri
Performance Coach (U17)	
Performance Coach (U15)	
Performance Coach (U13)	
Individual Coach (U17) & Talent Coordinator	(Portugal) Gonçalo Barbosa
Individual Coach (U15)	(Portugal) Diogo Lopes
Individual Coach (U13)	(Portugal) Rui Duro
S&C Coach (U17)	(Singapore) Gabriel Low
S&C Coach (U15)	
S&C Coach (U13)	(Singapore) Leslie Chen
Medical Coordinator	(Estonia) Tarmo Tikk
Sports Trainer	(Singapore) Amanda Cheong
Video Analyst (Development)	(Singapore) Raihan Ismail
Video Analyst (U17)	(Singapore) Zachary Wu
Match Analyst (U17)	
Rehabilitation Coach (U17)	(Portugal) João Crespo
Video Analyst (U15)	(Singapore) Poh Kai Ern
Nutritionist	(Netherlands) Denise Van Ewijk
Administrative Manager	(Singapore) Clement Choong
Logistics Manager	(Malaysia) Jackson Goh
Multimedia Manager	(Singapore) Adrian Tan
International Relations	(Singapore) Calum Lim
Kitman	(Singapore) Uncle John

== Transfers ==
=== In ===
Date	Position	Player	Transferred from	Fee	Ref
1 July 2026	FW	(Singapore) Farhan Zulkifli	(Singapore) Hougang United	Undisclosed	
8 July 2026	DF	(Singapore) Ryhan Stewart	(Thailand) Kanchanaburi Power	Free	
13 July 2026	FW	(Singapore) Glenn Kweh	(Singapore) Tampines Rovers	Free	
16 July 2026	DF	(Brazil) Hugo Gomes	(Vietnam) Cong An Hanoi	Free	
20 July 2026	FW	(Singapore) Ilhan Fandi	(Thailand) BG Pathum United	Undisclosed	
23 July 2026	DF	(Georgia (country)) Jorge Karseladze	(Portugal) Rio Ave	Undisclosed	
28 July 2026	FW	(Guadeloupe) Matthias Phaëton	(Bulgaria) CSKA Sofia	Undisclosed (Note: Fee rumored to be $500k.)	
31 July 2026	FW	(Croatia) Antonio Mance	(Qatar) Umm Salal	Undisclosed	
4 August 2026	MF	(France) Giovanni Haag	(Germany) Fortuna Düsseldorf	Free	
6 August 2026	FW	(Netherlands) Bobby Adekanye	(Turkey) Manisa	Undisclosed	
13 August 2026	GK	(Brazil) Victor Aznar	(Spain) Cádiz CF	Undisclosed	

=== Out ===
Date	Position	Player	Transferred to	Ref
25 May 2026	MF	(Singapore) Hafiz Nor	(Singapore) Young Lions	Free
26 May 2026	MF	(Portugal) Rui Pires	(Cambodia) PKR Svay Rieng	Free
27 May 2026	DF	(Singapore) Christopher van Huizen	(Singapore) FC Jurong	Free
28 May 2026	FW	(Serbia) Luka Adžić	(Serbia) FK Zeleznicar Pancevo	Free
28 May 2026	MF	(Brazil) Lucas Agueiro	(Hong Kong) KC Southern	Free
29 May 2026	DF	(Singapore) Akram Azman	(Singapore) FC Jurong	Free
30 May 2026	GK	(Singapore) Izwan Mahbud	(Singapore) Young Lions	Free
30 May 2026	GK	(Singapore) Zharfan Rohaizad	(Singapore) Tampines Rovers	Free
30 May 2026	DF	(Singapore) Zulqarnaen Suzliman	(Singapore) Hougang United	Free
26 June 2026	FW	(Brazil) Anderson Lopes	(Japan) Vissel Kobe	Undisclosed
01 July 2026	MF	(Japan) Joshua Little	(Singapore)	Free

=== Loans Out ===
Date	Position	Player	Loan to	Ref
17 July 2026	MF	(Singapore) Khairin Nadim	(Singapore) Hougang United	Season loan
26 July 2026	GK	(Slovenia) Benjamin Žerak	(Singapore) Young Lions	Season loan
14 August 2026	RW	(Singapore) Jonan Tan	(Croatia) NK Dugopolje	Season loan

=== Contract renewals ===
Date	Pos.	Player	Till
2 June 2026	MF	(Netherlands) Bart Ramselaar	2028
3 June 2026	MF	(Singapore) Song Ui-young	2027
7 June 2026	MF	(Singapore) Nur Muhammad Asis	2029
7 June 2026	FW	(Singapore) Khairin Nadim	2029
7 June 2026	MF	(Singapore) Jonan Tan	2029
8 June 2026	DF	(Croatia) Toni Datković	2027
10 June 2026	DF	(Singapore) Lionel Tan	2029
14 June 2025	DF	(Australia) Bailey Wright	2027
15 June 2026	DF	(Singapore) Nur Adam Abdullah	2029
19 June 2026	FW	(Germany) Lennart Thy	2027

== Friendlies ==
=== Pre-season - Tour of Spain, Cadiz ===
Win Draw Loss

21 August 2026 Friendly- MD1	Lion City Sailors (Singapore)	Cancelled	(Spain) Cádiz CF Mirandilla	Puerto Real, Cádiz, Spain
10:30 UTC+2				Stadium: Ciudad Deportiva Bahía de Cádiz
Note: Match was cancelled due to unforeseen circumstances.

22 August 2026 Friendly- MD2	Lion City Sailors (Singapore)	1-1	(Spain) Atlético Madrileño	Jerez, Cádiz, Spain
--:-- UTC+2	Matthias Phaëton 44'	Report	Joel 24'	Stadium: Montecastillo

25 August 2026 Friendly- MD3	Lion City Sailors (Singapore)	1-1	(Spain) Xerez Deportivo FC	Jerez, Cádiz, Spain
19:00 UTC+2	Antonio Mance 33' (pen.)	Report	50'	Stadium: Montecastillo; Attendance: 0
Note: The match was held behind closed doors.

29 August 2026 Friendly- MD4	Lion City Sailors (Singapore)	3-2	(Spain) CD Málaga Juniors FC	Cártama, Málaga, Spain
18:30 UTC+2	Antonio Mance; Shawal Anuar; Lennart Thy	Report	Goal	Stadium: Profutcamps; Attendance: 0
Note: The match was held behind closed doors. Initial match was supposed to be with Malaga B.

== Squad statistics ==
=== Appearances and goals ===
As of 27 May 2026

No.	Pos.	Player	Singapore Premier League		Singapore Cup		AFC Champions League Two		ASEAN Club Championship		Community Shield		Total	
No.	Pos.	Player	Apps.	Goals	Apps.	Goals	Apps.	Goals	Apps.	Goals	Apps.	Goals	Apps.	Goals
2	DF	(Georgia (country)) Jorge Karseladze	0	0	0	0	0	0	0	0	0	0	0	0
3	DF	(Brazil) Hugo Gomes	0	0	0	0	0	0	0	0	0	0	0	0
4	DF	(Croatia) Toni Datković	0	0	0	0	0	0	0	0	0	0	0	0
5	DF	(Singapore) Lionel Tan	0	0	0	0	0	0	0	0	0	0	0	0
6	MF	(Germany) Tsiy-William Ndenge	0	0	0	0	0	0	0	0	0	0	0	0
7	FW	(Singapore) Shawal Anuar	0	0	0	0	0	0	0	0	0	0	0	0
9	FW	(Germany) Lennart Thy	0	0	0	0	0	0	0	0	0	0	0	0
10	MF	(Netherlands) Bart Ramselaar	0	0	0	0	0	0	0	0	0	0	0	0
11	FW	(Singapore) Glenn Kweh	0	0	0	0	0	0	0	0	0	0	0	0
12	FW	(Croatia) Antonio Mance	0	0	0	0	0	0	0	0	0	0	0	0
13	GK	(Singapore) Adib Azahari	0	0	0	0	0	0	0	0	0	0	0	0
14	MF	(Singapore) Hariss Harun	0	0	0	0	0	0	0	0	0	0	0	0
15	MF	(Singapore) Song Ui-young	0	0	0	0	0	0	0	0	0	0	0	0
16	MF	(Singapore) Hami Syahin	0	0	0	0	0	0	0	0	0	0	0	0
17	FW	(Singapore) Ilhan Fandi	0	0	0	0	0	0	0	0	0	0	0	0
18	DF	(Singapore) Ryhan Stewart	0	0	0	0	0	0	0	0	0	0	0	0
19	MF	(Singapore) Farhan Zulkifli	0	0	0	0	0	0	0	0	0	0	0	0
20	DF	(Singapore) Nur Adam Abdullah	0	0	0	0	0	0	0	0	0	0	0	0
23	FW	(Guadeloupe) Matthias Phaëton	0	0	0	0	0	0	0	0	0	0	0	0
25	GK	(Croatia) Ivan Sušak	0	0	0	0	0	0	0	0	0	0	0	0
26	DF	(Australia) Bailey Wright	0	0	0	0	0	0	0	0	0	0	0	0
29	DF	(Portugal) Diogo Costa	0	0	0	0	0	0	0	0	0	0	0	0
31	FW	(Singapore) Abdul Rasaq	0	0	0	0	0	0	0	0	0	0	0	0
41	MF	(Japan) Joshua Little	0	0	0	0	0	0	0	0	0	0	0	0
46	MF	(Singapore) Kyoga Nakamura	0	0	0	0	0	0	0	0	0	0	0	0
??	MF	(Singapore) Nur Muhammad Asis	0	0	0	0	0	0	0	0	0	0	0	0
??	MF	(Singapore) Jonan Tan	0	0	0	0	0	0	0	0	0	0	0	0
Players who have left on loan to other club

== Competitions ==
=== Overview ===
Competition	First match	Last match	Starting round	Final position	Record							
Competition	First match	Last match	Starting round	Final position	Pld	W	D	L	GF	GA	GD	Win %
Singapore Premier League	12 September 2026		Matchday 1		5	4	1	0	20	3	+17	80.00
Singapore Community Shield	6 September 2026		Final	Winners	1	1	0	0	2	0	+2	100.00
Singapore Cup					0	0	0	0	0	0	+0	—
AFC Champions League Two	17 September 2026		Group stage		4	3	1	0	9	1	+8	75.00
ASEAN Club Championship	8 October 2026		Group stage		1	0	0	1	0	1	−1	0.00
Total					11	8	2	1	31	5	+26	72.73

Last updated: 5 November 2026
Source: Competitions

=== Community Shield ===
6 September 2026 Community Shield	Lion City Sailors (Singapore)	2–0	(Singapore) Tampines Rovers	Jalan Besar
				Stadium: Jalan Besar Stadium

=== Singapore Premier League ===
12 September 2026 1	Hougang United (Singapore)	2–2	(Singapore) Lion City Sailors	Bishan
				Stadium: Bishan Stadium

21 October 2026 2 (Rescheduled)	Lion City Sailors (Singapore)	–	(Singapore) Tampines Rovers	Jalan Besar
				Stadium: Jalan Besar Stadium

11 October 2026 3	Lion City Sailors (Singapore)	6–1	(Singapore) Young Lions	Jalan Besar
				Stadium: Jalan Besar Stadium

18 October 2026 4	FC Jurong (Singapore)	0–2	(Singapore) Lion City Sailors	Jurong East
				Stadium: Jurong East Stadium

25 October 2026 5	Lion City Sailors (Singapore)	6–0	(Singapore) Tanjong Pagar United	Jalan Besar
				Stadium: Jalan Besar Stadium

1 November 2026 6	Balestier Khalsa (Singapore)	0–4	(Singapore) Lion City Sailors	Bishan
				Stadium: Bishan Stadium

22 November 2026 7	Lion City Sailors (Singapore)	–	(Singapore) Geylang International	Jalan Besar
				Stadium: Jalan Besar Stadium

29 November 2026 8	Young Lions (Singapore)	–	(Singapore) Lion City Sailors	Jalan Besar
				Stadium: Jalan Besar Stadium

14 February 2027 9	Lion City Sailors (Singapore)	–	(Singapore) FC Jurong	Jalan Besar
				Stadium: Jalan Besar Stadium

21 February 2027 10	Balestier Khalsa (Singapore)	–	(Singapore) Lion City Sailors	Bishan
				Stadium: Bishan Stadium

28 February 2027 11	Lion City Sailors (Singapore)	–	(Singapore) Hougang United	Jalan Besar
				Stadium: Jalan Besar Stadium

7 March 2027 12	Lion City Sailors (Singapore)	–	(Singapore) Tampines Rovers	Jalan Besar
				Stadium: Jalan Besar Stadium

14 March 2027 13	Geylang International (Singapore)	–	(Singapore) Lion City Sailors	Tampines
				Stadium: Our Tampines Hub

21 March 2027 14	Tanjong Pagar United (Singapore)	–	(Singapore) Lion City Sailors	Jurong East
				Stadium: Jurong East Stadium

4 April 2027 15	Lion City Sailors (Singapore)	–	(Singapore) Geylang International	Jalan Besar
				Stadium: Jalan Besar Stadium

11 April 2027 16	FC Jurong (Singapore)	–	(Singapore) Lion City Sailors	Jurong East
				Stadium: Jurong East Stadium

18 April 2027 17	Lion City Sailors (Singapore)	–	(Singapore) Young Lions	Jalan Besar
				Stadium: Jalan Besar Stadium

24 April 2027 18	Tampines Rovers (Singapore)	–	(Singapore) Lion City Sailors	Tampines
				Stadium: Our Tampines Hub

30 April 2027 19	Lion City Sailors (Singapore)	–	(Singapore) Hougang United	Jalan Besar
				Stadium: Jalan Besar Stadium

9 May 2027 20	Lion City Sailors (Singapore)	–	(Singapore) Balestier Khalsa	Jalan Besar
				Stadium: Jalan Besar Stadium

15 May 2027 21	Tanjong Pagar United (Singapore)	–	(Singapore) Lion City Sailors	Jurong East
				Stadium: Jurong East Stadium

Pos	Team	Pld	W	D	L	GF	GA	GD	Pts
1	Geylang International	6	4	2	0	12	2	+10	14
2	Lion City Sailors	5	4	1	0	20	3	+17	13
3	Tampines Rovers	5	4	1	0	13	3	+10	13
4	FC Jurong	6	2	1	3	11	9	+2	7
5	Balestier Khalsa	6	2	1	3	7	12	−5	7
6	Tanjong Pagar United	6	2	1	3	7	16	−9	7
7	Young Lions (Note: Young Lions are not eligible to represent Singapore in AFC club competitions.)	6	1	0	5	6	21	−15	3
8	Hougang United	6	0	1	5	4	14	−10	1

Updated to match(es) played on 1 November 2026. Source: Singapore Premier League
Rules for classification: 1) Points; 2) goal difference; 3) goals scored; 4) wins

=== AFC Champions League Two ===
==== Group stage ====
Pos	Team	Pld	W	D	L	GF	GA	GD	Pts	Qualification	LCS	BGP	ADE	TPF
1	(Singapore) Lion City Sailors	4	3	1	0	9	1	+8	10	Advance to round of 16	—	1–1	5–0	–
2	(Thailand) BG Pathum United	4	2	1	1	9	4	+5	7	Advance to round of 16	–	—	1–2	4–1
3	(Australia) Adelaide United	4	2	0	2	5	8	−3	6		0–2	–	—	3–0
4	(Hong Kong) Tai Po (E)	4	0	0	4	1	11	−10	0		0–1	0–3	–	—

Updated to match(es) played on 5 November 2026. Source: ACL2
Rules for classification: Tiebreakers
(E) Eliminated

17 September 2026 1	Lion City Sailors (Singapore)	1–1	(Thailand) BG Pathum United	Jalan Besar, Singapore
	Marko Nikolić 24' (o.g.); Song Ui-young (yellow card) 34'; Toni Datković (yellow card) 35'	Report	Patrik Gustavsson 51'; Edin Osmanovic (yellow card) 24'; Surachat Sareepim (yellow card) 75'; Elijah Dolah (yellow card) 82'	Stadium: Jalan Besar Stadium; Referee: Resul Mämmedow (Turkmenistan)

15 October 2026 2	(Hong Kong) Tai Po FC	0–1	Lion City Sailors (Singapore)	Hong Kong
				Stadium: Mong Kok Stadium

29 October 2026 3	Adelaide United (Australia)	0–2	(Singapore) Lion City Sailors	Adelaide, Australia
				Stadium: Coopers Stadium

5 November 2026 4	Lion City Sailors (Singapore)	5–0	(Australia) Adelaide United	Jalan Besar, Singapore
				Stadium: Jalan Besar Stadium

26 November 2026 5	BG Pathum United (Thailand)	–	(Singapore) Lion City Sailors	Bangkok, Thailand
				Stadium: True BG Stadium

3 December 2026 6	Lion City Sailors (Singapore)	–	(Hong Kong) Tai Po FC	Jalan Besar, Singapore
				Stadium: Jalan Besar Stadium

=== ASEAN Club Championship ===
==== Group stage ====
Pos	Team	Pld	W	D	L	GF	GA	GD	Pts	Qualification	JDT	SIB	CAH	SUN	LCS	POR	PKR
1	(Malaysia) Johor Darul Ta'zim	1	1	0	0	6	0	+6	3	Advance to knockout stage	—	—	—	10 Dec	1 Apr	—	6–0
2	(Indonesia) Persib	1	1	0	0	3	1	+2	3	Advance to knockout stage	17 Dec	—	4 Mar	19 Nov	—	—	—
3	(Vietnam) Công An Hà Nội	1	1	0	0	1	0	+1	3	Advance to knockout stage	19 Nov	—	—	25 Feb	—	—	10 Dec
4	(Myanmar) Shan United	0	0	0	0	0	0	0	0	Advance to knockout stage	—	—	—	—	4 Mar	17 Dec	1 Apr
5	(Singapore) Lion City Sailors	1	0	0	1	0	1	−1	0		—	10 Dec	0–1	—	—	25 Feb	—
6	(Thailand) Port	1	0	0	1	1	3	−2	0		4 Mar	1–3	1 Apr	—	—	—	—
7	(Cambodia) PKR Svay Rieng	1	0	0	1	0	6	−6	0		—	25 Feb	—	—	17 Dec	19 Nov	—

Updated to match(es) played on 8 October 2026. Source: ASEAN United
Rules for classification: Tiebreakers

8 October 2026 1	Lion City Sailors (Singapore)	0–1	(Vietnam) Công An Hà Nội	Jalan Besar, Singapore
				Stadium: Jalan Besar Stadium

10 December 2026 2	Lion City Sailors (Singapore)	–	(Indonesia) Persib	Jalan Besar, Singapore
				Stadium: Jalan Besar Stadium

17 December 2026 3	PKR Svay Rieng (Cambodia)	–	(Singapore) Lion City Sailors	Svay Rieng, Cambodia
				Stadium: Svay Rieng Stadium

25 February 2027 4	Lion City Sailors (Singapore)	–	(Thailand) Port	Jalan Besar, Singapore
				Stadium: Jalan Besar Stadium

4 March 2027 5	Ezra (Laos) / Shan United (Myanmar)	–	(Singapore) Lion City Sailors	Vientiane, Laos / Taunggyi, Myanmar
				Stadium: New Laos National Stadium / Taunggyi Stadium

1 April 2027 6	Johor Darul Ta'zim (Malaysia)	–	(Singapore) Lion City Sailors	Johor, Malaysia
				Stadium: Sultan Ibrahim Stadium

== Competition (SPL2) ==
Win Draw Loss

25 August 2026 1	Lion City Sailors (Singapore)	1-4	(Singapore) Tanjong Pagar United	Jurong East
19:30 UTC+8		Report		Stadium: Jurong East Stadium

30 August 2026 2	Tampines Rovers (Singapore)	3-0	(Singapore) Lion City Sailors	Tampines
19:30 UTC+8		Report		Stadium: Our Tampines Hub

3 September 2026 3	Geylang International (Singapore)	–	(Singapore) Lion City Sailors	Bedok
				Stadium: Bedok Stadium

8 September 2026 4	Lion City Sailors (Singapore)	–	(Singapore) Hougang United	Bedok
				Stadium: Bedok Stadium

19 October 2026 5	Lion City Sailors (Singapore)	–	(Singapore) Balestier Khalsa	Bedok
				Stadium: Bedok Stadium

7 November 2026 6	FC Jurong (Singapore)	–	(Singapore) Lion City Sailors	Jurong East
				Stadium: Jurong East Stadium

5 December 2026 7	Young Lions (Singapore)	–	(Singapore) Lion City Sailors	Bedok
				Stadium: Bedok Stadium

13 December 2026 8	Lion City Sailors (Singapore)	–	(Singapore) Tanjong Pagar United	Bedok
				Stadium: Bedok Stadium

16 December 2026 9	Lion City Sailors (Singapore)	–	(Singapore) Tampines Rovers	Bedok
				Stadium: Bedok Stadium

20 December 2026 10	Geylang International (Singapore)	–	(Singapore) Lion City Sailors	Bedok
				Stadium: Bedok Stadium

5 January 2027 11	Lion City Sailors (Singapore)	–	(Singapore) Hougang United	Bedok
				Stadium: Bedok Stadium

8 January 2027 12	Balestier Khalsa (Singapore)	–	(Singapore) Lion City Sailors	Bishan
				Stadium: Bishan Stadium

12 January 2027 13	Lion City Sailors (Singapore)	–	(Singapore) FC Jurong	Jurong East
				Stadium: Jurong East Stadium

16 January 2027 14	Young Lions (Singapore)	–	(Singapore) Lion City Sailors	Bedok
				Stadium: Bedok Stadium

20 January 2027 15	Tanjong Pagar United (Singapore)	–	(Singapore) Lion City Sailors	Choa Chu Kang
				Stadium: Choa Chu Kang Stadium

24 January 2027 16	Lion City Sailors (Singapore)	–	(Singapore) Tampines Rovers	Tampines
				Stadium: Our Tampines Hub

30 January 2027 17	Lion City Sailors (Singapore)	–	(Singapore) Geylang International	Bedok
				Stadium: Bedok Stadium

3 February 2027 18	Hougang United (Singapore)	–	(Singapore) Lion City Sailors	Choa Chu Kang
				Stadium: Choa Chu Kang Stadium

22 February 2027 19	Lion City Sailors (Singapore)	–	(Singapore) Balestier Khalsa	Tampines
				Stadium: Our Tampines Hub

1 March 2027 20	FC Jurong (Singapore)	–	(Singapore) Lion City Sailors	Jurong East
				Stadium: Jurong East Stadium

5 April 2027 21	Lion City Sailors (Singapore)	–	(Singapore) Young Lions	Bedok
				Stadium: Bedok Stadium

Pos	Team	Pld	W	D	L	GF	GA	GD	Pts	Qualification or relegation
1	Geylang International II	6	5	0	1	19	2	+17	15	Champion
2	Balestier Khalsa II	6	4	1	1	10	7	+3	13	
3	Tampines Rovers II	5	4	0	1	18	5	+13	12	
4	Young Lions B	3	2	0	1	10	7	+3	6	
5	FC Jurong II	5	1	1	3	11	12	−1	4	
6	Hougang United II	5	1	1	3	5	13	−8	4	
7	Tanjong Pagar United II	6	1	1	4	8	24	−16	4	
8	Lion City Sailors II	6	1	0	5	7	18	−11	3	

First match(es) will be played: 6 November 2026. Source: Singapore Premier League 2
Rules for classification: 1) points; 2) goal difference; 3) number of goals scored; 4) number of wins
