= 2025–26 Lion City Sailors FC season =

Lion City Sailors
2025–26 season
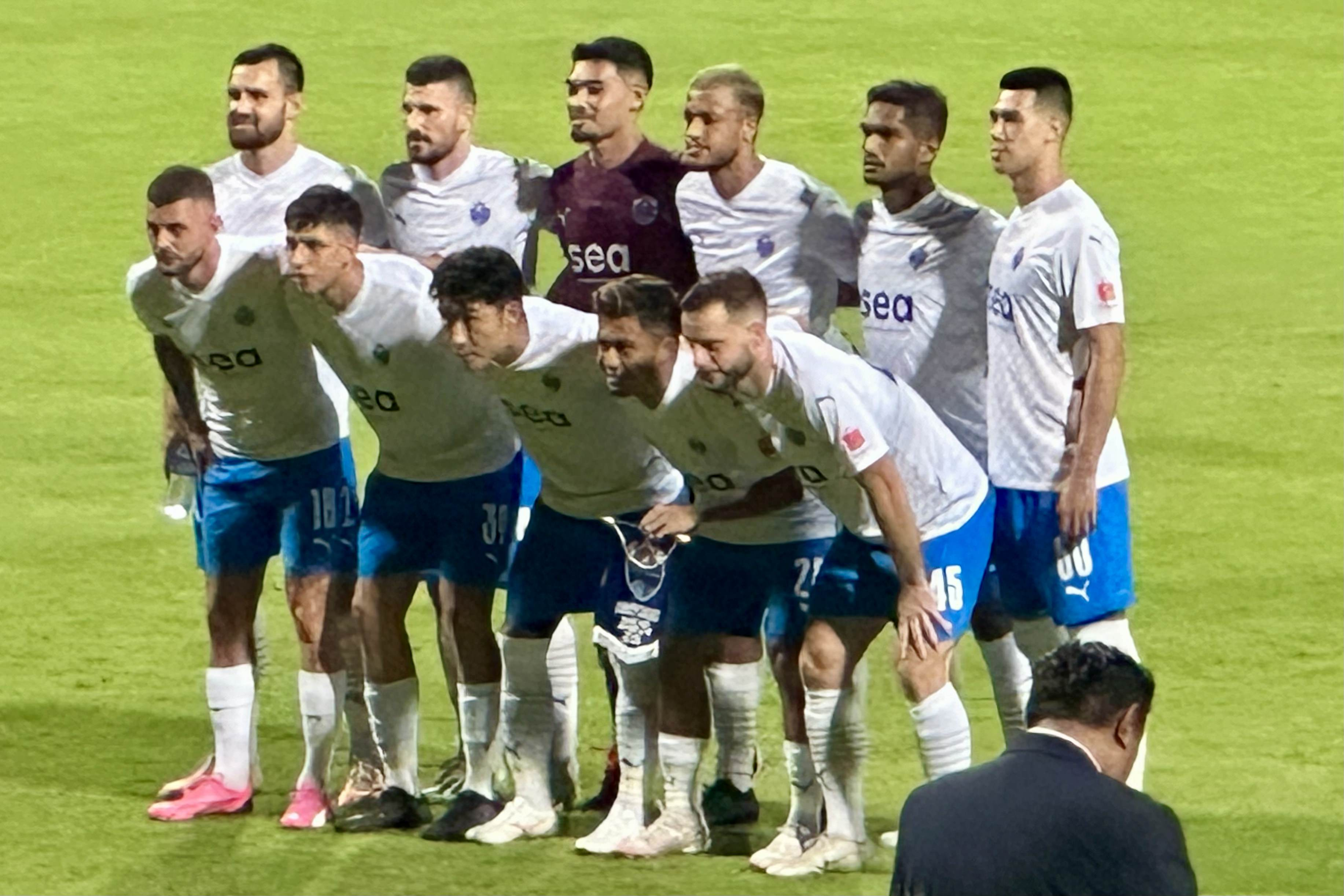
- Match between Lion City Sailors and Johor Darul Ta'zim
- Owner: Sea Limited
- Chairman: Forrest Li
- Head coach: Aleksandar Ranković
- Stadium: Bishan Stadium
- Singapore Premier League: 1st
- Singapore Cup: Semi Finals
- AFC Champions League Two: Group stage
- ASEAN Club Championship: League stage
- Singapore Community Shield: Runners-up
- Top goalscorer: League: TBD; All: TBD
Home colours	Away colours

The 2025–26 season is Lion City Sailors' 30th consecutive season in the Singapore Premier League and the 6th season since privatising from Home United. In addition to the Singapore Premier League, Lion City Sailors are also participating in the Singapore Cup, AFC Champions League Two, ASEAN Club Championship, and the Singapore Community Shield. This season also marks the change in kit supplier from Puma to Adidas.

== Summary ==
This season marks the first for club chairman Forrest Li's appointment as Football Association of Singapore's Deputy President on 28 April 2025. Captain Hariss Harun, general manager Tan Li Yu were both appointed as part of the four vice-presidents elected while executive director Bruce Liang serves as one of the three council members.

On 8 June 2025, Lion City Sailors announced the end of Ali Al Rina's loan spell, with the Syrian returning to his parent club Al-Ittihad Ahli. The departures of Spanish defender Sergio Carmona and Haiqal Pashia were also announced on the same day following the expiry of their contracts. Obren Kljajić and Anumanthan Kumar also departed the club on 10 June. Bill Mamadou left the club on 12 June 2025, after his contract expiration. He later joined Thai League 1 club Nakhon Ratchasima on a free transfer on 14 June.

Contract extensions were given to captain Hariss Harun, vice-captain and third captain Bailey Wright and Hafiz Nor, and also Rui Pires. Adib Azahari extended his contract on 27 June.

Lion City Sailors signed a three-year partnership agreement Adidas, becoming the official kit supplier with effect from 1 July 2025.

Lion City Sailors made their first signing on 6 July 2025 after announcing Safuwan Baharudin on a season long loan from Selangor.

After a successful 2024–25 season, head coach Aleksandar Ranković signed a two-year contract extension on 7 July 2025. Lion City Sailors made their second signing on 8 July after signing loanee Diogo Costa on a permanent five-year contract. On 10 and 16 July, the club announced that both Croatian goalkeeper Ivan Sušak and German midfielder Tsiy-William Ndenge had signed two-year deals respectively.

On 17 July, the club announced the signing of two-time J1 League top scorer Anderson Lopes on a three-year deal for an undisclosed fee.

The Sailors started the season with a 1–4 defeat to Tampines Rovers, finishing as runners-up in the Singapore Community Shield.

=== Kits ===
Home	Away	Home alt.^{1}	Home alt.^{2}
Goalkeeper; Home		Goalkeeper; Away

== Squad ==
=== Singapore Premier League ===
As of 10 June 2025

Squad No.	Name	Nationality	Date of Birth (Age)	Previous Club	Contract Since	Contract End
Goalkeepers
12	Benjamin Žerak	(Slovenia)	14 December 2006 (age 19)	(Singapore) Young Lions	2025	2027
13	Adib Azahari	(Singapore)	9 March 1998 (age 28)	(Singapore) Young Lions	2020	2027
25	Ivan Sušak	(Croatia)	6 October 1997 (age 29)	(Croatia) Slaven Belupo	2025	2027
Defenders
4	Toni Datković	(Croatia)	6 November 1993 (age 33)	(Spain) Albacete	2024	2027
5	Lionel Tan	(Singapore)	5 June 1997 (age 29)	(Singapore) Hougang United	2023	2026
11	Hafiz Nor (3rd captain)	(Singapore)	22 August 1988 (age 38)	(Singapore) Warriors	2018	2026
20	Nur Adam Abdullah	(Singapore)	13 April 2001 (age 25)	(Singapore) Young Lions	2021	2027
26	Bailey Wright (vice-captain)	(Australia)	28 July 1992 (age 34)	(England) Sunderland	2023	2027
29	Diogo Costa	(Portugal)	27 July 2003 (age 23)	(Portugal) Famalicão	2025	2030
30	Akram Azman	(Singapore)	21 November 2000 (age 25)	(Singapore) Tanjong Pagar United	2025	2026
Midfielders
6	Tsiy-William Ndenge	(Germany) (Cameroon)	13 June 1997 (age 29)	(Switzerland) Grasshopper	2025	2027
8	Rui Pires	(Portugal)	22 March 1998 (age 28)	(Portugal) Paços de Ferreira	2023	2026
10	Bart Ramselaar	(Netherlands)	29 June 1996 (age 30)	(Netherlands) Utrecht	2024	2026
14	Hariss Harun (captain)	(Singapore)	9 November 1990 (age 35)	(Malaysia) Johor Darul Ta'zim	2021	2027
15	Song Ui-young	(Singapore) (South Korea)	8 November 1993 (age 33)	(Indonesia) Persebaya Surabaya	2024	2027
16	Hami Syahin	(Singapore)	16 December 1998 (age 27)	(Singapore) Young Lions	2019	2027
33	Lucas Agueiro	(Brazil)	13 July 2004 (age 22)	(Singapore) Young Lions	2025	2026
46	Kyoga Nakamura	(Singapore) (Japan)	25 April 1996 (age 30)	(Thailand) Bangkok United	2026	2028
	Nur Muhammad Asis	(Singapore)	4 March 2004 (age 22)	(Portugal) Estrela U23	2022	2026
Forwards
7	Shawal Anuar	(Singapore)	29 April 1991 (age 35)	(Singapore) Hougang United	2023	2027
9	Lennart Thy	(Germany)	25 February 1992 (age 34)	(Netherlands) PEC Zwolle	2024	2026
18	Anderson Lopes	(Brazil)	15 September 1993 (age 33)	(Japan) Yokohama F. Marinos	2025	2028
28	Luka Adžić	(Serbia)	17 September 1998 (age 28)	(Thailand) Bangkok United	2026	2026
Players on loan / NS
1	Izwan Mahbud	(Singapore)	14 July 1990 (age 36)	(Singapore) Hougang United	2022	2025
19	Zulqarnaen Suzliman	(Singapore)	29 March 1998 (age 28)	(Singapore) Young Lions	2020	2025
28	Zharfan Rohaizad	(Singapore)	21 February 1997 (age 29)	(Singapore) Tanjong Pagar United	2023	2025
31	Abdul Rasaq	(Singapore) (Nigeria)	16 June 2001 (age 25)	(Singapore) Young Lions	2023	2027
41	Joshua Little	(Republic of Ireland) (Japan)	30 October 2007 (age 19)	(Singapore) Lion City Sailors U21	2022	2026
80	Nathan Mao	(Singapore)	26 March 2008 (age 18)	(Singapore) Lion City Sailors U21	2022	2026
Players who left mid-season
17	Maxime Lestienne	(Belgium)	17 June 1992 (age 34)	(Belgium) Standard Liège	2022	2025
21	Safuwan Baharudin	(Singapore)	22 September 1991 (age 35)	(Malaysia) Selangor	2025	2026

Remarks:
^{FP U21} These players are registered as U21 foreign players.

=== Singapore Premier League 2 ===
As of 10 June 2025

Squad No.	Name	Nationality	Date of Birth (Age)	Previous Club	Contract Since	Contract End
Goalkeepers
51	Efan Qiszman	(Singapore)	20 September 2006 (age 20)	(Singapore) Balestier Khalsa U21	2025	2026
61	Seth Lee	(Singapore)	12 January 2007 (age 19)	(Singapore) Balestier Khalsa U21	2025	2026
71	Nor Aqmar Shamil	(Singapore)	24 June 2007 (age 19)	(Singapore) BG Tampines Rovers U21	2025	2026
Defenders
52	Akmal Azman	(Singapore)	21 November 2000 (age 25)	(Singapore) Geylang International	2025	2026
53	Danish Irfan	(Singapore)	10 March 1999 (age 27)	(Singapore) Hougang United	2025	2026
54	Aaryan Fikri	(Singapore)	5 September 2007 (age 19)	(Singapore) Balestier Khalsa U21	2025	2026
57	Ikmal Hazlan	(Singapore)	11 January 2007 (age 19)	(Singapore) Young Lions FC	2025	2026
62	Raiyan Izdihar	(Singapore)	9 March 2007 (age 19)	(Singapore) Balestier Khalsa U21	2025	2026
74	Adrian Jaccard	(Singapore)	30 October 2006 (age 20)	(Singapore) BG Tampines Rovers U21	2026	2026
75	Alexander Koh	(Singapore)	2 January 2008 (age 18)	(Singapore) Sailors Development U17	2025	2026
82	Karlheinz Oma Koppe	(Germany) (Singapore)	14 July 2008 (age 18)	(Singapore) Sailors Development U17	2024	2026
83	Aaryan Irzan	(Singapore)		(Singapore) BG Tampines Rovers U17	2026	2026
84	Caleb Tan Kai Zhe	(Singapore)		(Singapore) Sailors Development U17	2022	2026
85	Ziqry Eizyanshah Azam	(Singapore)		(Singapore) Sailors Development U17	2024	2026
Midfielders
55	Izz Anaqi	(Singapore)	17 August 2002 (age 24)	(Singapore) Young Lions FC	2025	2026
59	Aiman Zayani	(Singapore)	28 February 2007 (age 19)	(Singapore) Balestier Khalsa U21	2025	2026
60	Yasir Nizamudin	(Singapore)	21 January 2005 (age 21)	(Singapore) Lion City Sailors U21	2022	2026
63	Ahmad Danial	(Singapore)	16 November 2005 (age 20)	(Singapore) Tanjong Pagar United U21	2025	2026
65	Brayden Khng	(Singapore)	9 September 2007 (age 19)	(Singapore) Balestier Khalsa U21	2025	2026
72	Ryan Lim Zong Han	(Singapore)	19 May 2006 (age 20)	Singapore Cricket Club	2025	2026
78	Xavier Tan Shan Yang	(Singapore)		(Singapore) Sailors Development U17	2023	2026
80	Rijan Rai	(Singapore) (Nepal)		(Singapore) Balestier Khalsa	2026	2026
87	Sean Luke Ong	(Singapore)		(Singapore) ActiveSG Academy U17	2023	2026
Forwards
58	Namsang Rai	(Singapore) (Nepal)	9 March 2006 (age 20)	(Singapore) Hougang United U21	2025	2026
66	Naufal Azman	(Singapore)	10 July 1998 (age 28)	(Singapore) Geylang International	2025	2026
67	Syafiq Asaraf	(Singapore)	12 June 2000 (age 26)	(Singapore) Jungfrau Punggol	2025	2026
68	Adam Faisal	(Singapore)	29 May 2007 (age 19)	(Singapore) Balestier Khalsa U21	2025	2026
77	Jadon Quah Song Yee	(Singapore)	20 April 2008 (age 18)	(Singapore) Sailors Development U17	2023	2026
Players on loan / NS
51	Ashman Saravanan	(Singapore) (Malaysia)	5 March 2008 (age 18)	(Malaysia) JDT Academy	2024	2026
53	Ainun Nuha Ilyasir	(Singapore)	11 March 2006 (age 20)	(Singapore) Lion City Sailors U17	2022	2026
54	Harith Luth Hadi	(Singapore)	19 March 2008 (age 18)	(Singapore) Lion City Sailors U17	2022	2026
55	Jonan Tan En Yuan	(Singapore)	27 June 2006 (age 20)	(Portugal) Estrela U23	2022	2026
56	Muhammad Fadly	(Singapore)	30 May 2007 (age 19)	(Singapore) Lion City Sailors U17	2023	2026
57	Enrico Walmrath Silveira	(Brazil)	6 April 2006 (age 20)	(Singapore) Lion City Sailors U17	2023	2026
58	Iliya Naufal	(Singapore)	6 July 2008 (age 18)	Singapore Sports School	2024	2026
59	Ilhan Rizqullah	(Singapore)	17 September 2008 (age 18)	(Singapore) Lion City Sailors U17	2022	2026
61	Andy Reefqy	(Singapore)	14 July 2008 (age 18)	Singapore Sports School	2023	2026
64	Harith Danish Irwan	(Singapore)	27 November 2008 (age 17)	Singapore Sports School	2024	2026
66	Sarrvin Raj	(Singapore)	5 April 2008 (age 18)	(Singapore) Lion City Sailors U15	2022	2026
67	Izzan Rifqi	(Singapore)	4 March 2010 (age 16)	(Singapore) Lion City Sailors U17	2022	2026
63	Idzham Eszuan	(Singapore)	14 February 2007 (age 19)	Lion City Sailors U17	2022	2026
67	Issac Goh Jun Yang	(Singapore)	5 June 2007 (age 19)	(Singapore) Lion City Sailors U15	2022	2026
70	Kieran Aryan Azhari	(Singapore)	31 May 2003 (age 23)	(Singapore) Lion City Sailors U17	2021	2026
71	Yazid Rais	(Singapore)	16 March 2006 (age 20)	(Singapore) Lion City Sailors U17	2022	2026
71	Kian Ghadessy	(Singapore) (England) (Iran)	30 November 2005 (age 20)	(Singapore) Balestier Khalsa U21	2024	2026
72	Ilyasin Zayan	(Singapore) (England)	22 March 2004 (age 22)	(Singapore) Young Lions	2022	2026
74	Tiago Martins	(Portugal)	8 February 2005 (age 21)	(Portugal) AVS Futebol SAD U19	2024	2026
75	Harry Spence	(England)	15 March 2006 (age 20)	(England) Hull City U18	2024	2026
76	Farrel Mohammad	(Singapore)	15 March 2009 (age 17)	(Singapore) Lion City Sailors U17	2022	2026
78	Danie Hafiy	(Singapore)	6 April 2004 (age 22)	(Singapore) Young Lions	2022	2026
79	Aniq Raushan	(Singapore)	5 October 2003 (age 23)	(Singapore) Young Lions	2021	2026
	Marcus Mosses	(Singapore)	21 January 2005 (age 21)	(Singapore) Tanjong Pagar United	2022	2027
	Fernandez Casey Klein	(Singapore) (Germany)	5 February 2007 (age 19)	(Singapore) Lion City Sailors U21	2023	2026
	Izrafil Yusof	(Singapore)	27 January 2004 (age 22)	(Singapore) Young Lions	2022	2027
	Aniq Tiryaq	(Singapore)	10 October 2006 (age 20)	(Singapore) Lion City Sailors U17	2021	2025
	Aqil Khusni	(Singapore)	23 April 2004 (age 22)	(Singapore) Mattar Sailors	2022	2026
	Uchenna Eziakor	(Singapore) (Nigeria)	17 May 2008 (age 18)	(Spain) ESC La Liga Academy	2022	2026
Players who left mid-season
56	Jan Tze Soong	(Singapore)	17 November 2007 (age 18)	(Singapore) Balestier Khalsa U21	2025	2026
64	Umar Ramle	(Singapore)	2 May 1996 (age 30)	(Singapore) Tanjong Pagar United	2025	2026
70	Faisal Shahril	(Singapore)	7 May 1997 (age 29)	(Singapore) Geylang International	2025	2026
79	Justin Hui Yong Kang	(Singapore)	17 February 1998 (age 28)	(Singapore) Hougang United	2025	2026

== Staff ==
The following list displays the coaching and administrative staff of Lion City Sailors FC:

Management Team

Position	Name
Chairman	(Singapore) Forrest Li
CEO	(Singapore) Bruce Liang
Sporting Director	(Serbia) Luka Lalić
Technical Director	(Serbia) Luka Lalić
General Manager	(Singapore) Tan Li Yu
Head of Recruitment	(Croatia) Igor Cerina

First Team

Position	Name
Team Manager (SPL)	(Vietnam) Hương Trần
Team Manager (WPL)	(Singapore) Jenny Tan
Head Women Program	(Singapore) Yeong Sheau Shyan (Note: Appointed as coach of U16 Girls National Team for Lion City Cup)
Head Coach	(Serbia) Aleksandar Ranković (till 6 Feb) (Spain) Jesús Casas
Head Coach (Women)	(Singapore) Daniel Ong
Assistant Coach	(Serbia) Marko Perović (till 6 Feb) (Serbia) Danilo Tesic (till 23 Feb) (Spain) Alejandro Varela (Spain) Salva Romero
Assistant Coach (Women)	(Singapore) Izz Haziq Izan
Goalkeeping Coach	(Serbia) Srdjan Maksimovic (till 6 Feb) (Spain) David Valle
Goalkeeping Coach (Women)	(Singapore) Joey Sim
Fitness Coach	(Spain) Manuel Salado
Head Strength & Conditioning (S&C) Coach	(Portugal) Miguel Bragança
Rehabilitation Coach	(Netherlands) Niels Van Sundert
Performance Coach	(Singapore) He Qi Xiang
Sports Scientist	(Netherlands) Mike Kerklaan (Portugal) André Gonçalves Mendes
Video Analyst	(Spain) Varo Moreno
Match Analyst	(Singapore) Daniel Lau
Head of Logistics	(Singapore) Zahir Taufeek
Sports Cordinator	(Singapore) Masrezal Bin Mashuri

U21 Team

Head Coach (Under-21)	(Singapore) Jasni Hatta
Asst Coach (Under-21)	
Goalkeeping Coach (Under-21)	(Singapore) Chua Lye Heng
Performance Coach (Under-21)	
Individual Coach (Under-21)	
Sports Scientist (Under-21)	
Match Analyst (Under-21)	
Video Analyst (Under-21)	

Academy

Position	Name
Head of Academy	(Portugal) Nuno Pereira
Head of DC Team	
Under-17 Head Coach & Academy Coordinator	(Portugal) Bruno Jeremias (Singapore) Ashraf Ariffin (Note: Appointed as coach of U16 Boys National Team for Lion City Cup)
Under-15 Head Coach	(Netherlands) Wiebe de Haan
Under-14 Head Coach	(Singapore) Khairil Asyraf
Under-13 Head Coach	(Singapore) Hamqaamal Shah
Under-12 Head Coach	(Portugal) Francisco Couto
Under-11 Head Coach	(Singapore) Kevin Tan
Under-10 Head Coach	
Head of Youth Goalkeeper Coach	(Singapore) Shahril Jantan
Goalkeeping Coach (U17)	(Singapore) Yeo Jun Guang
Goalkeeping Coach (U15)	
Goalkeeping Coach (U13)	(Singapore) Fadly Tamiri
Performance Coach (U17)	
Performance Coach (U15)	
Performance Coach (U13)	
Individual Coach (U17) & Talent Coordinator	(Portugal) Gonçalo Barbosa
Individual Coach (U15)	(Portugal) Diogo Lopes
Individual Coach (U13)	(Portugal) Rui Duro
S&C Coach (U17)	(Singapore) Gabriel Low
S&C Coach (U15)	
S&C Coach (U13)	(Singapore) Leslie Chen
Medical Coordinator	(Estonia) Tarmo Tikk
Sports Trainer	(Singapore) Amanda Cheong
Video Analyst (Development)	(Singapore) Raihan Ismail
Video Analyst (U17)	(Singapore) Zachary Wu
Match Analyst (U17)	(Singapore) Gautam Selvamany
Rehabilitation Coach (U17)	(Portugal) João Crespo
Video Analyst (U15)	(Singapore) Poh Kai Ern
Nutritionist	(Netherlands) Denise Van Ewijk
Administrative Manager	(Singapore) Clement Choong
Logistics Manager	(Malaysia) Jackson Goh
Multimedia Manager	(Singapore) Adrian Tan
International Relations	(Singapore) Calum Lim
Kitman	(Singapore) Uncle John

== Transfers ==
=== In ===
Preseason

Date	Position	Player	Transferred from	Ref
First Team
6 July 2025	DF	(Singapore) Safuwan Baharudin	(Malaysia) Selangor	Season loan
8 July 2025	DF	(Portugal) Diogo Costa	(Portugal) F.C. Famalicão (P1)	5 years contract till Jun-2030
10 July 2025	GK	(Croatia) Ivan Susak	(Croatia) Slaven Belupo	2 years contract till Jun-2027
16 July 2025	MF	(Cameroon) (Germany) Tsiy-William Ndenge	(Switzerland) Grasshopper	2 years contract till Jun-2027
17 July 2025	FW	(Brazil) Anderson Lopes	(Japan) Yokohama F. Marinos	SGD$2m; 3 years contract till Jun-2028
31 July 2025	DF	(Singapore) Nur Adam Abdullah	(Singapore) Young Lions	End of NS
15 August 2025	MF	(Singapore) Justin Hui	(Singapore) Hougang United	Free
31 August 2025	DF	(Singapore) Akmal Azman	(Singapore) Geylang International	Free
31 August 2025	DF	(Singapore) Faisal Shahril	(Singapore) Geylang International	Free
31 August 2025	DF	(Singapore) Danish Irfan	(Singapore) Hougang United	Free
31 August 2025	MF	(Singapore) Umar Ramle	(Singapore) Tanjong Pagar United	Free
31 August 2025	FW	(Singapore) Naufal Azman	(Singapore) Geylang International	Free
U23
1 June 2025	DF	(Singapore) Marcus Mosses	(Singapore) Tanjong Pagar United	End of loan
1 June 2025	MF	(Singapore) Uvayn Kumar	(Singapore) Tanjong Pagar United	End of loan
1 June 2025	MF	(Singapore) Izrafil Yusof	(Singapore) Tanjong Pagar United	End of loan (Note: Izrafil moves to Young Lions on loan for new season.)
1 June 2025	MF	(Singapore) Yasir Nizamudin	(Singapore) Hougang United U21	End of loan
1 July 2025	FW	(Singapore) (Nigeria) Uchenna Eziakor	(Spain) Rayo Ciudad Alcobendas Academy	End of loan
31 July 2025	MF	(Singapore) Nur Muhammad Asis	(Portugal) C.F. Estrela da Amadora (P1)	End of loan (Note: Asis loan with Estrela’s B Team ended and he moved to FC Vizela U23 on loan.)
31 July 2025	MF	(Singapore) Jonan Tan En Yuan	(Portugal) C.F. Estrela da Amadora (P1)	End of loan (Note: Jonan Tan with Estrela’s B Team ended and he moved to FC Vizela U23 on loan.)
20 August 2025	GK	(Singapore) Efan Qiszman	(Singapore) Balestier Khalsa U21	Free
20 August 2025	GK	(Singapore) Seth Lee	(Singapore) Balestier Khalsa U21	Free
20 August 2025	DF	(Singapore) Aaryan Fikri	(Singapore) Balestier Khalsa U21	Free
20 August 2025	DF	(Singapore) Raiyan Izdihar	(Singapore) Balestier Khalsa U21	Free
20 August 2025	MF	(Singapore) Aiman Zayani	(Singapore) Balestier Khalsa U21	Free
20 August 2025	MF	(Singapore) Bryan Khng	(Singapore) Balestier Khalsa U21	Free
20 August 2025	MF	(Singapore) Adam Faisal	(Singapore) Balestier Khalsa U21	Free
20 August 2025	MF	(Singapore) Jan Tze Soong	(Singapore) Balestier Khalsa U21	Free
20 August 2025	MF	(Singapore) Ahmad Danial	(Singapore) Tanjong Pagar United U21	Free
20 August 2025	FW	(Singapore) (Nepal) Namsang Rai	(Singapore) Hougang United	Free

Mid-season

Date	Position	Player	Transferred from	Ref
First Team
6 January 2026	FW	(Serbia) Luka Adžić	(Thailand) Bangkok United	Free
8 January 2026	FW	(Singapore) (Japan) Kyoga Nakamura	(Thailand) Bangkok United	Free
9 January 2026	GK	(Slovenia) Benjamin Žerak	(Singapore) Young Lions	End of loan
9 January 2026	MF	(Brazil) Lucas Agueiro	(Singapore) Young Lions	End of loan
U23
1 January 2026	DF	(Singapore) Adrian Jaccard	Free Agent	N.A.
1 January 2026	DF	(Singapore) Aniq Raushan	(Singapore) Young Lions	End of loan
1 January 2026	MF	(Singapore) Danie Hafiy	(Singapore) Young Lions	End of loan
1 January 2026	FW	(Singapore) (England) Ilyasin Zayan	(Singapore) Young Lions	End of loan
1 January 2026	MF	(Singapore) (Nepal) Rijan Rai	(Singapore) Balestier Khalsa	Free
11 January 2026	FW	(Singapore) Izrafil Yusof	(Singapore) Young Lions	End of loan
1 May 2026	MF	(Singapore) Nur Muhammad Asis	(Portugal) FC Vizela U23 (P2)	End of loan

=== Out ===
Preseason

Date	Position	Player	Transferred To	Ref
First Team
31 May 2025	DF	(Portugal) Diogo Costa	(Portugal) F.C. Famalicão (P1)	End of loan
31 May 2025	DF	(Syria) Ali Al Rina	(Syria) Al-Ittihad SC Aleppo	End of loan
8 June 2025	FW	(Singapore) Haiqal Pashia	(Singapore) Hougang United	Free
8 June 2025	DF	(Spain) Sergio Carmona	(Spain) CF Rayo Majadahonda	Free
10 June 2025	DF	(Australia) (Bosnia and Herzegovina) Obren Kljajić	(Australia) Wollongong Wolves	Free
10 June 2025	MF	(Singapore) Anumanthan Kumar	(Thailand) Kanchanaburi Power	Free
12 June 2025	DF	(Singapore) (Mali) Bill Mamadou	(Thailand) Nakhon Ratchasima	Free
9 July 2025	GK	(Singapore) Zharfan Rohaizad	(Singapore) Hougang United	Season loan
U23
30 June 2025	MF	(Singapore) Uvayn Kumar	(Singapore)	Free
30 June 2025	MF	(Singapore) (England) (Japan) Ewan Seddon	(Singapore)	Free
30 June 2025	FW	(Singapore) Qaisy Noranzor	(Singapore)	Free
1 July 2025	DF	(Singapore) Marcus Mosses	(Singapore) Young Lions	Season loan till Dec-25
1 July 2025	DF	(Singapore) Aniq Raushan	(Singapore) Young Lions	Season loan till Dec-25
1 July 2025	DF	(Singapore) Iliya Naufal	(Singapore) Young Lions	Season loan
1 July 2025	DF	(Brazil) Enrico Walmrath Silveira	(Singapore) Young Lions	Season loan
1 July 2025	MF	(Singapore) Danie Hafiy	(Singapore) Young Lions	Season loan till Dec-25
1 July 2025	MF	(Singapore) Harith Danish Irwan	(Singapore) Young Lions	Season loan
1 July 2025	MF	(Singapore) Andy Reefqy	(Singapore) Young Lions	Season loan
1 July 2025	MF	(Portugal) (France) Tiago Martins	(Singapore) Balestier Khalsa	Season loan
1 July 2025	FW	(England) Harry Spence	(Singapore) Young Lions	Season loan
1 July 2025	FW	(Singapore) (England) Ilyasin Zayan	(Singapore) Young Lions	Season loan
1 July 2025	FW	(Singapore) (Germany) Fernandez Casey Klein	(Singapore) Young Lions	Season loan
1 July 2025	FW	(Singapore) Izrafil Yusof	(Singapore) Young Lions	Season loan till Dec-25
1 July 2025	FW	(Singapore) (Nigeria) Uchenna Eziakor	(Singapore) Young Lions	Season loan
2 July 2025	MF	(Singapore) Jonan Tan	(Portugal) FC Vizela U23 (P2)	Season loan till May 2026 (Note: Asis will primarily train and play with Estrela’s B Team, while also turning out for the club’s Under-23 side.)
1 August 2025	MF	(Singapore) Nur Muhammad Asis	(Portugal) FC Vizela U23 (P2)	Season loan till May 2026
13 August 2025	DF	(Singapore) Ilhan Rizqullah	(Singapore) Young Lions	Season loan
13 August 2025	MF	(Singapore) Sarrvin Raj	(Singapore) Young Lions	Season loan

Mid season

Date	Position	Player	Transferred To	Ref
First Team
8 December 2025	DF	(Singapore) Safuwan Baharudin	(Malaysia) Selangor	Early Termination of loan
31 December 2025	FW	(Belgium) Maxime Lestienne	Retired	End of Contract
5 January 2026	DF	(Singapore) Zulqarnaen Suzliman	(Japan) Albirex Niigata (S)	Season loan
7 January 2026	GK	(Singapore) Izwan Mahbud	(Singapore) Young Lions	Season loan
15 January 2026	FW	(Singapore) (Nigeria) Abdul Rasaq	(Japan) Albirex Niigata (S)	Season loan
SPL2, U23 & Academy
31 December 2025	MF	(Singapore) Jan Tze Soong	(Singapore) SAFSA	Free. Enlisted
31 December 2025	DF	(Singapore) Faisal Shahril	(Singapore) Geylang International	Free
31 December 2025	MF	(Singapore) Umar Ramle	Retired	N.A.
31 December 2025	MF	(Singapore) Justin Hui	Retired	N.A.
1 January 2026	DF	(Singapore) Aniq Raushan	(Singapore) Balestier Khalsa	Season loan
1 January 2026	FW	(Singapore) (England) Ilyasin Zayan	(Singapore) Balestier Khalsa	Season loan
10 January 2026	FW	(Singapore) Izrafil Yusof	(Singapore) Tanjong Pagar United	Season loan
31 January 2026	MF	(Republic of Ireland) (Japan) Joshua Little	(Singapore) Young Lions	Season loan

=== Contract renewals ===
Date	Pos.	Player	Ref.
9 June 2025	DF	(Australia) Bailey Wright	
11 June 2025	MF	(Portugal) Rui Pires	
13 June 2025	MF	(Singapore) Hariss Harun	
18 June 2025	DF	(Singapore) Hafiz Nor	
27 June 2025	GK	(Singapore) Adib Azahari	
28 June 2025	DF	(Croatia) Toni Datković	
29 June 2025	DF	(Singapore) Christopher van Huizen	
29 June 2025	FW	(Singapore) Abdul Rasaq	
30 June 2025	GK	(Singapore) Zharfan Rohaizad	
30 June 2025	GK	(Singapore) Izwan Mahbud	
30 June 2025	FW	(Singapore) Shawal Anuar	

== Squad statistics ==
=== Appearances and goals ===
As of 17 May 2026

No.	Pos.	Player	Singapore Premier League		Singapore Cup		Community Shield		AFC Champions League Two		ASEAN Club Championship		Total	
No.	Pos.	Player	Apps.	Goals	Apps.	Goals	Apps.	Goals	Apps.	Goals	Apps.	Goals	Apps.	Goals
4	DF	(Croatia) Toni Datković	16+3	3	3	0	1	0	6	0	4	0	33	3
5	DF	(Singapore) Lionel Tan	6+4	0	1+2	0	1	0	2+1	0	4+1	0	22	0
6	MF	(Cameroon) (Germany) Tsiy-William Ndenge	16+4	2	2+1	0	0+1	0	6	1	5	0	35	3
7	FW	(Singapore) Shawal Anuar	11+9	7	3	2	0+1	0	1+5	1	4+1	1	35	11
8	MF	(Portugal) Rui Pires	9+6	2	2+1	0	1	0	5	0	2	0	26	2
9	FW	(Germany) Lennart Thy	16+5	15	3	1	0+1	1	3+2	3	3	2	33	22
10	MF	(Netherlands) Bart Ramselaar	18+2	8	1+1	0	1	0	5	0	1	0	29	8
11	DF	(Singapore) Hafiz Nor	2+7	0	0+1	0	0	0	0	0	0+3	0	13	0
12	GK	(Slovenia) Benjamin Žerak	0	0	0	0	0	0	0	0	0	0	0	0
13	GK	(Singapore) Adib Azahari	0	0	0	0	0	0	0	0	0	0	0	0
14	MF	(Singapore) Hariss Harun	7+5	0	0	0	0+1	0	3	0	2	0	18	0
15	MF	(Singapore) (South Korea) Song Ui-young	6+5	2	2	0	1	0	3+3	0	2	0	22	2
16	MF	(Singapore) Hami Syahin	10+8	0	1+2	1	0+1	0	1+2	0	3+1	0	29	1
18	FW	(Brazil) Anderson Lopes	9+9	11	1+2	2	1	0	6	5	5	1	33	19
20	DF	(Singapore) Nur Adam Abdullah	7+6	0	0+1	0	0	0	0	0	0+3	0	17	0
22	DF	(Singapore) Christopher van Huizen	8+4	0	2+1	0	0	0	1+1	0	1+3	0	21	0
25	GK	(Croatia) Ivan Sušak	19	1	1	0	1	0	6	0	4	0	31	1
26	DF	(Australia) Bailey Wright	18+1	5	3	1	0	0	5	0	4	0	31	6
28	FW	(Serbia) Luka Adžić	0+4	0	0+1	0	0	0	0	0	0	0	5	0
29	DF	(Portugal) Diogo Costa	16+2	4	3	0	1	0	6	0	5	0	33	4
30	DF	(Singapore) Akram Azman	13+2	2	0+2	0	1	0	2+2	0	2+2	0	26	2
33	MF	(Brazil) Lucas Agueiro	2+7	0	0	0	0	0	0	0	0	0	9	0
41	MF	(Republic of Ireland) Joshua Little	0	0	0	0	0	0	0	0	0	0	0	0
46	MF	(Singapore) (Japan) Kyoga Nakamura	15+1	0	1	0	0	0	0	0	0	0	17	0
Players who have played this season but had left the club on loan to other club
1	GK	(Singapore) Izwan Mahbud	2	0	2	0	0	0	0	0	1	0	5	0
28	GK	(Singapore) Zharfan Rohaizad	0	0	0	0	0	0	0	0	0	0	0	0
19	DF	(Singapore) Zulqarnaen Suzliman	0+1	0	0	0	0	0	0	0	0	0	1	0
31	FW	(Singapore) (Nigeria) Abdul Rasaq	0+3	1	0+1	0	0	0	0+4	0	0+3	0	11	1
Players who have played this season but had left the club
17	FW	(Belgium) Maxime Lestienne	4	4	2	0	1	0	3+1	0	2	2	13	6
21	DF	(Singapore) Safuwan Baharudin	1+1	0	0	0	1	0	2	0	1	0	6	0

== Competitions ==
=== Overview ===
Competition	First match	Last match	Starting round	Final position	Record							
Competition	First match	Last match	Starting round	Final position	Pld	W	D	L	GF	GA	GD	Win %
Singapore Premier League	25 August 2025		Matchday 1		15	13	2	0	59	8	+51	86.67
Singapore Community Shield	16 August 2025		Final	Runners-up	1	0	0	1	1	4	−3	0.00
Singapore Cup	14 December 2025	10 January 2026	Semi-finals	Winners	3	3	0	0	7	1	+6	100.00
AFC Champions League Two	18 September 2025	10 December 2025	Group stage	Group stage	6	3	1	2	10	8	+2	50.00
ASEAN Club Championship	21 August 2025	5 February 2026	Group stage	Group stage	5	1	1	3	6	12	−6	20.00
Total					30	20	4	6	83	33	+50	66.67

Last updated: 6 April 2026
Source: Competitions

=== Community Shield ===
As the defending Singapore Premier League and Singapore Cup champions, Lion City Sailors will face the 2024–25 Singapore Premier League runners-up Tampines Rovers in the Singapore Community Shield.

16 August 2025 Final	Lion City Sailors	1–4	BG Tampines Rovers	Jurong East
20:00 UTC+8	Diogo Costa (yellow card) 79'; Thy 87'	Report	Buhagiar 2', 42'; Koya 61'; Hide 90+1'; Joel (yellow card) 90+12'	Stadium: Jurong East Stadium; Referee: Farhad Mohamed

=== Singapore Premier League ===
==== League table ====
Pos	Team	Pld	W	D	L	GF	GA	GD	Pts	Qualification or relegation
1	Lion City Sailors (C)	21	16	3	2	70	14	+56	51	Qualification for Champions League Two group stage (Note: Since the winners of the 2025–26 Singapore Cup, Lion City Sailors, qualified for the Champions League Two by league position, the spot reserved for the Singapore Cup winners will pass to the runners-up of the league.)
2	BG Tampines Rovers	21	15	4	2	58	21	+37	49	Qualification for Champions League Two group stage
3	Albirex Niigata (S)	21	15	2	4	47	19	+28	47	
4	Balestier Khalsa	21	11	2	8	44	46	−2	35	
5	Geylang International	21	7	3	11	29	42	−13	24	
6	Hougang United	21	7	0	14	24	41	−17	21	
7	Young Lions (Note: Young Lions cannot qualify for AFC competitions.)	21	2	3	16	15	58	−43	9	
8	Tanjong Pagar United	21	2	1	18	17	63	−46	7	

Updated to match(es) played on 18 May 2026. Source: Singapore Premier League
Rules for classification: 1) points; 2) goal difference; 3) number of goals scored; 4) number of wins
(C) Champions

==== Results summary ====
Overall								Home						Away					
Pld	W	D	L	GF	GA	GD	Pts	W	D	L	GF	GA	GD	W	D	L	GF	GA	GD
5	5	0	0	22	2	+20	15	3	0	0	10	2	+8	2	0	0	12	0	+12

Last updated: August 2025.
Source: Soccerway

=== Singapore Premier League ===
Win Draw Loss

25 August 2025 1	Lion City Sailors (Singapore)	2–1	(Singapore) Hougang United	Tampines
	Maxime Lestienne 10', 47'; Lionel Tan (yellow card) 28'; Song Ui-young (yellow card) 84'	Report	Farhan Zulkifli 29'; Anders Aplin (yellow card) 57'; Jordan Vestering (yellow card) 83'	Stadium: Our Tampines Hub (Note: Location changed due to re-turfing of Bishan Stadium); Referee: Clarence Leow; Man of the Match: (Belgium) Maxime Lestienne

14 September 2025 2	Balestier Khalsa (Singapore)	0–5	(Singapore) Lion City Sailors	Tampines
		Report	Bailey Wright 27'; Bart Ramselaar 72'; Lennart Thy 82'; Abdul Rasaq Akeem 90'; Maxime Lestienne 90+4'; Diogo Costa (yellow card) 64'	Stadium: Our Tampines Hub; Referee: Andrea Verolino; Man of the Match: (Netherlands) Bart Ramselaar

21 September 2025 3	Tanjong Pagar United (Singapore)	0–7	(Singapore) Lion City Sailors	Jurong East
		Report	Lennart Thy 14', 45+7'; Diogo Costa 28'; Rui Pires 45+10'; Song Ui-young 45+14'; Anderson Lopes 84', 90+3'	Stadium: Jurong East Stadium; Referee: Farhan Mohd; Man of the Match: (Germany) Lennart Thy

18 October 2026 4	Lion City Sailors (Singapore)	5–1	(Singapore) Young Lions	Bishan
	Maxime Lestienne 18'; Bailey Wright 34'; Lennart Thy 49'; Bart Ramselaar 79'; Shawal Anuar 81'; Nur Adam (yellow card) 38'	Report	Lucas Agueiro 30'; Andrew Aw (yellow card) 72'	Stadium: Bishan Stadium; Referee: Taufik Thana; Man of the Match: (Germany) Lennart Thy

27 October 2025 5 (Rescheduled)	Lion City Sailors (Singapore)	3–0	(Japan) Albirex Niigata (S)	Bishan
	Lennart Thy 19'; Bart Ramselaar 62'; Akram Azman 73'	Report	Takumi Yokohata (yellow card) 69'	Stadium: Bishan Stadium; Referee: Ahmad A'Qashah; Man of the Match: (Netherlands) Bart Ramselaar

17 May 2026 6 (Rescheduled)	BG Tampines Rovers (Singapore)	3–2	(Singapore) Lion City Sailors	Tampines
	Jacob Mahler 57'; Yuki Kobayashi 75'; Hide Higashikawa 78'; Koya Kazama (yellow card) 80' (yellow-red card) 83'	Report	Song Ui-young 50'; Lennart Thy 59'; Kyoga Nakamura (yellow card) 9'; Bailey Wright (yellow card) 63'; Hami Syahin (yellow card) 90+5'	Stadium: Our Tampines Hub; Referee: Mazlan Pagira; Man of the Match: (Japan) Yuki Kobayashi

18 January 2026 7	Geylang International (Singapore)	0–3	(Singapore) Lion City Sailors	Tampines
	Nikola Ignjatovic (yellow card) 42'	Report	Nazrul Nazari 43' (o.g.); Tsiy-William Ndenge 64'; Shawal Anuar 90+1'; Diogo Costa (yellow card) 5'; Bailey Wright (yellow card) 26'	Stadium: Our Tampines Hub; Referee: Farhan Mohd; Man of the Match: (Singapore) Shawal Anuar

24 January 2026 8	Hougang United (Singapore)	1–5; Awarded (Note: Hougang United v Lion City Sailors, originally won 5–1 by Lion City Sailors, was forfeited and awarded 5–1 to Lion City Sailors by the FAS Disciplinary Committee on 3 Mar 2026, as Hougang United fielded Gloire Amanda, even though he has not completed the required regulatory clearances relating to his work pass status. FAS commented that the scorelines will either remain as recorded or be adjusted to 3–0, whichever reflects the greater margin,)	(Singapore) Lion City Sailors	Bishan
	Settawut Wongsai 11'; Huzaifah Aziz (yellow card) 52'	Report	Shawal Anuar 18'; Ryaan Sanizal 27' (o.g.); Lennart Thy 32'; Bart Ramselaar 65', 72'; Kyoga Nakamura (yellow card) 39'; Akram Azman (yellow card) 43'	Stadium: Bishan Stadium (Note: Location changed due to swopping of stadium with LCS upon completion of returfing of Jalan Besar Stadium); Referee: Syarqawi Buhari; Man of the Match: (Netherlands) Bart Ramselaar

1 February 2026 9	Lion City Sailors (Singapore)	5–1	(Singapore) Balestier Khalsa	Jalan Besar
	Anderson Lopes 22', 32'; Diogo Costa 27'; Shawal Anuar 37'; Bailey Wright 66'; Lucas Agueiro (yellow card) 69'	Report	Lionel Tan 24' (o.g.); Harith Kanadi (yellow card) 28'; Lazar Vujanić (yellow card) 43'; Daniel Goh (yellow card) 48'	Stadium: Jalan Besar Stadium; Referee: Mazlan Pagira; Man of the Match: (Brazil) Anderson Lopes

8 February 2026 10	Young Lions (Singapore)	0–2	(Singapore) Lion City Sailors	Jalan Besar
	Sergio Mendonça (yellow card) 71'	Report	Bailey Wright 14'; Lennart Thy 35'; Akram Azman (yellow card) 75'	Stadium: Jalan Besar Stadium; Referee: Syarqawi Buhari; Man of the Match: (Australia) Bailey Wright

15 February 2026 11	Lion City Sailors (Singapore)	7–0	(Singapore) Tanjong Pagar United	Jalan Besar
	Bart Ramselaar 4', 74'; Anderson Lopes 19'; Kim Li-Kwan 45+4'; Shawal Anuar 50'; Akram Azman 82'; Lennart Thy 83'; Bailey Wright (yellow card) 46'	Report	Shodai Nishikawa (red card) 15'	Stadium: Jalan Besar Stadium; Referee: Ahmad A'Qashah; Man of the Match: (Netherlands) Bart Ramselaar

22 February 2026 12	Lion City Sailors (Singapore)	1–1	(Singapore) BG Tampines Rovers	Jalan Besar
	Lennart Thy 22'; Kyoga Nakamura (yellow card) 37'; Rui Pires (yellow card) 77'; Bart Ramselaar (yellow card) 90+4'	Report	Koya Kazama 44'	Stadium: Jalan Besar Stadium; Referee: Jansen Foo; Man of the Match: (Japan) Koya Kazama

28 February 2026 13	Albirex Niigata (S) (Japan)	3–3	(Singapore) Lion City Sailors	Jurong East
	Ryang Hyon-ju 1'; Hariss Harun 14' (o.g.); Komei Iida 66'; Zulqarnaen Suzliman (yellow card) 53'	Report	Anderson Lopes 39' (pen.); Tsiy-William Ndenge 54'; Ivan Sušak 90+7'; Hariss Harun (yellow card) 27'; Hami Syahin (yellow card) 33'; Diogo Costa (yellow card) 89'	Stadium: Jurong East Stadium; Referee: Syarqawi Buhari; Man of the Match: (North Korea) Ryang Hyon-ju

7 March 2026 14 (Rescheduled)	Lion City Sailors (Singapore)	4–0	(Singapore) Geylang International	Jalan Besar
	Toni Datković 27', 79'; Anderson Lopes 28' (yellow card) 68'; Shawal Anuar 71'	Report	Nikola Ignjatovic (yellow card) 45+2'; Nazrul Nazari (yellow card) 45+10'	Stadium: Jalan Besar Stadium; Referee: Mazlan Pagira; Man of the Match: (Croatia) Toni Datković

15 March 2026 15	Balestier Khalsa (Singapore)	0–3	(Singapore) Lion City Sailors	Bishan
	Harith Kanadi (red card) 85'	Report	Diogo Costa 33'; Lennart Thy 40'; Anderson Lopes 85' (pen.)	Stadium: Bishan Stadium; Referee: Clarence Leow; Man of the Match: (Portugal) Diogo Costa

6 April 2026 16	Tanjong Pagar United (Singapore)	0–4	(Singapore) Lion City Sailors	Jurong East
	Junior Djile (yellow card) 45+2'; Faizal Roslan (red card) 75'	Report	Lennart Thy 32'; Bart Ramselaar 48'; Bailey Wright 64'; Diogo Costa 90+9'	Stadium: Jurong East Stadium; Referee: Oswind Suriya; Man of the Match: (Australia) Bailey Wright

12 April 2026 17	Lion City Sailors (Singapore)	4–1	(Singapore) Hougang United	Jalan Besar
	Lennart Thy 37' (pen.); Shawal Anuar 46'; Toni Datković 60' (yellow card) 19'; Anderson Lopes 90+1'		Huzaifah Aziz 9' (yellow card) 86'; Ridhuan Barudin (yellow card) 36'; Yuma Suwa (yellow card) 75'	Stadium: Jalan Besar Stadium; Referee: Farhan Mohd; Man of the Match: (Cameroon) (Germany) Tsiy-William Ndenge

20 April 2026 18	Lion City Sailors (Singapore)	2–0	(Singapore) Young Lions	Jalan Besar
	Lennart Thy 73'; Anderson Lopes 90+8'; Shawal Anuar (yellow card) 78'; Song Ui-young (yellow card) 86'		Ajay Robson (yellow card) 21' (yellow-red card) 61'; Abner Vinicius (yellow card) 90+5'; Sergio Mendonça (yellow card) 90+9'	Stadium: Jalan Besar Stadium; Referee: Jansen Foo; Man of the Match: (Germany) Lennart Thy

26 April 2026 19	Geylang International (Singapore)	0–3	(Singapore) Lion City Sailors	Tampines
	Shahdan Sulaiman (red card) 66'	Report	Anderson Lopes 36'; Rui Pires 46'; Lennart Thy 67' (pen.); Hami Syahin (yellow card) 90+4'	Stadium: Our Tampines Hub; Referee: Zulfiqar Mustaffa; Man of the Match: (Singapore) Lionel Tan

3 May 2026 20 (Rescheduled)	BG Tampines Rovers (Singapore)	0–0	(Singapore) Lion City Sailors	Tampines
		Report	Christopher van Huizen (yellow card) 37'; Jesús Casas (yellow card) 55'; Rui Pires (yellow card) 61'; Ivan Susak (yellow card) 90+5'	Stadium: Our Tampines Hub; Referee: Ahmad A'Qashah; Man of the Match: (Japan) Seiga Sumi

10 May 2026 21	Lion City Sailors (Singapore)	0–2	(Japan) Albirex Niigata (S)	Jalan Besar
	Nur Adam (yellow card) 85'; Toni Datković (red card) 90+6'		Shingo Nakano 49'; Toni Datković 52' (o.g.)	Stadium: Jalan Besar Stadium; Referee: Mazlan Pariga

Pos	Team	Pld	W	D	L	GF	GA	GD	Pts	Qualification or relegation
1	Lion City Sailors (C)	21	16	3	2	70	14	+56	51	Qualification for Champions League Two group stage (Note: Since the winners of the 2025–26 Singapore Cup, Lion City Sailors, qualified for the Champions League Two by league position, the spot reserved for the Singapore Cup winners will pass to the runners-up of the league.)
2	BG Tampines Rovers	21	15	4	2	58	21	+37	49	Qualification for Champions League Two group stage
3	Albirex Niigata (S)	21	15	2	4	47	19	+28	47	
4	Balestier Khalsa	21	11	2	8	44	46	−2	35	
5	Geylang International	21	7	3	11	29	42	−13	24	
6	Hougang United	21	7	0	14	24	41	−17	21	
7	Young Lions (Note: Young Lions cannot qualify for AFC competitions.)	21	2	3	16	15	58	−43	9	
8	Tanjong Pagar United	21	2	1	18	17	63	−46	7	

Updated to match(es) played on 18 May 2026. Source: Singapore Premier League
Rules for classification: 1) points; 2) goal difference; 3) number of goals scored; 4) number of wins
(C) Champions

=== Singapore Cup ===
==== Semi Final ====
14 December 2025 Semi Final Leg 1	Balestier Khalsa (Singapore)	1–4	(Singapore) Lion City Sailors	Bishan
	Bogdan Mandić 12'		Bailey Wright 26'; Lennart Thy 34'; Shawal Anuar 47'; Anderson Lopes 58'	Stadium: Bishan Stadium; Referee: Andrea Verolino; Man of the Match: (Germany) Lennart Thy

20 December 2025 Semi Final Leg 2	Lion City Sailors (Singapore)	1–0 (5–1 agg.)	(Singapore) Balestier Khalsa	Jalan Besar
	Shawal Anuar 8'; Maxime Lestienne (penalty missed) 72			Stadium: Jalan Besar Stadium; Referee: Muhammad Taqi; Man of the Match: (Singapore) Shawal Anuar

Lion City Sailors won 5–1 on aggregate.

==== Final ====
10 January 2026 Final	Lion City Sailors (Singapore)	3–0; Awarded (Note: The match, originally won by Lion City Sailors 2-0 after extra time, was forfeited by Tampines Rovers and awarded 3–0 to Lion City Sailors, as Tampines fielded more than the allowed number of foreigners) (a.e.t.)	(Singapore) BG Tampines Rovers	Jalan Besar
	Hami Syahin 115'; Anderson Lopes 120+2'; Shawal Anuar (yellow card) 34'			Stadium: Jalan Besar Stadium; Attendance: 3,767; Referee: Adam Kersey (Australia); Man of the Match: Bailey Wright

=== AFC Champions League Two ===
==== Group stage ====
Pos	Team	Pld	W	D	L	GF	GA	GD	Pts	Qualification	PSB	BKU	LCS	SEL
1	(Indonesia) Persib	6	4	1	1	11	6	+5	13	Advance to round of 16	—	1–0	1–1	2–0
2	(Thailand) Bangkok United	6	3	1	2	8	7	+1	10 (Note: Head-to-head points: Bangkok United 6, Lion City Sailors 0.)	Advance to round of 16	0–2	—	1–0	1–1
3	(Singapore) Lion City Sailors	6	3	1	2	10	8	+2	10		3–2	1–2	—	4–2
4	(Malaysia) Selangor	6	0	1	5	7	15	−8	1		2–3	2–4	0–1	—

Source: ACL2
Rules for classification: Tiebreakers
Notes:

18 September 2025 1	Persib (Indonesia)	1–1	(Singapore) Lion City Sailors	Bandung, Indonesia
19:15 UTC+7	Ramdani 47'	Report	L. Thy 90+2'	Stadium: Gelora Bandung Lautan Api Stadium; Attendance: 13,566; Referee: Hanna Hattab (Syria)

1 October 2025 2	Lion City Sailors (Singapore)	4–2	(Malaysia) Selangor	Bishan, Singapore
18:00 UTC+8	Lopes 7', 13', 45+4', 54'	Report	Chrigor 37' (pen.); Halim 73'	Stadium: Bishan Stadium; Referee: Chae Sang-hyeop (South Korea)

23 October 2025 3	Bangkok United (Thailand)	1–0	(Singapore) Lion City Sailors	Pathum Thani, Thailand
19:15 UTC+7	Al-Ghassani 63' (pen.); Zivkovic (penalty missed) 11'	Report	Hariss (red card) 62'	Stadium: True BG Stadium; Attendance: 1,006; Referee: Casey Reibelt (Australia)

6 November 2025 4	Lion City Sailors (Singapore)	1–2	(Thailand) Bangkok United	Bishan, Singapore
18:00 UTC+8	Thy 90+1'	Report	Al-Ghassani 45+2'; Adžić 82'	Stadium: Bishan Stadium; Attendance: 2,049; Referee: Ahmad Alaeddin (Lebanon)

26 November 2025 5	Lion City Sailors (Singapore)	3–2	(Indonesia) Persib	Bishan, Singapore
20:15 UTC+8	Thy 9'; Shawal 62'; Lopes 71'	Report	Putros 11'; Jung 56'	Stadium: Bishan Stadium; Attendance: 2,578; Referee: Ammar Mahfoodh (Bahrain)

10 December 2025 6	Selangor (Malaysia)	0–1	(Singapore) Lion City Sailors	Petaling Jaya, Malaysia
20:15 UTC+8		Report	Ndenge 50'	Stadium: Petaling Jaya Stadium; Attendance: 2,354; Referee: Hiroki Kasahara (Japan)

=== ASEAN Club Championship ===
==== Group stage ====
Pos	Team	Pld	W	D	L	GF	GA	GD	Pts	Qualification	NDI	JDT	PKR	BKU	LCS	SUN
1	(Vietnam) Nam Định	5	4	1	0	13	3	+10	13	Advance to knockout stage	—	1–1	2–1	—	3–0	—
2	(Malaysia) Johor Darul Ta'zim	5	3	2	0	13	4	+9	11	Advance to knockout stage	—	—	—	4–0	3–1	3–0
3	(Cambodia) Preah Khan Reach Svay Rieng	5	2	2	1	9	5	+4	8		—	2–2	—	1–1	—	—
4	(Thailand) Bangkok United	5	1	2	2	6	12	−6	5		1–4	—	—	—	2–2	2–1
5	(Singapore) Lion City Sailors	5	1	1	3	6	12	−6	4		—	—	0–2	—	—	3–2
6	(Myanmar) Shan United	5	0	0	5	3	14	−11	0		0–3	—	0–3	—	—	—

Source: ASEAN United FC
Rules for classification: Tiebreakers

21 August 2025 1	Johor Darul Ta'zim (Malaysia)	3–1	(Singapore) Lion City Sailors	Johor, Malaysia
	João Figueiredo 11' (pen.), 16'; Arif Aiman 90+3'; Afiq Fazail (yellow card) 78'; Bergson (yellow card) 83'	Report	Shawal Anuar 90+5'; Safuwan Baharudin (yellow card) 8'; Rui Pires (yellow card) 45+3'	Stadium: Sultan Ibrahim Stadium; Attendance: 13,143; Referee: Koji Takasaki (Japan)

17 December 2025 2 (Rescheduled)	Lion City Sailors (Singapore)	3–2	(Myanmar) Shan United	Jalan Besar, Singapore
	Lennart Thy 23', 68'; Maxime Lestienne 45+2'	Report	Matheus Souza 28' (pen.); Ryuji Hirota 66'; Thet Wai Moe (yellow card) 90+1'	Stadium: Jalan Besar Stadium; Attendance: 1,543; Referee: Yusuke Ohashi (Japan)

4 December 2025 3	Bangkok United (Thailand)	2–2	(Singapore) Lion City Sailors	Pathum Thani, Thailand
	Jakkaphan Praisuwan 24'; Seia Kunori 76'; Suphan Thongsong (yellow card) 35'; Wanchai Jarunongkran (yellow card) 75'	Report	Maxime Lestienne 11'; Anderson Lopes 20'	Stadium: True BG Stadium; Referee: Meder Tayçiev (Kyrgyzstan)

29 January 2026 4	Nam Định (Vietnam)	3–0	(Singapore) Lion City Sailors	Ninh Bình, Vietnam
	Caio César 35'; Nguyễn Xuân Son 61', 90+2'; Trần Văn Kiên (yellow card) 20'	Report		Stadium: Thiên Trường Stadium; Attendance: 3,923; Referee: Mohammed Al-Shammar (Qatar)

5 February 2026 5	Lion City Sailors (Singapore)	0–2	(Cambodia) PKR Svay Rieng	Jalan Besar, Singapore
	Anderson Lopes (yellow card) 66'	Report	Patrick 51', 64'; Cristian Roque (yellow card) 61'	Stadium: Jalan Besar Stadium; Referee: Kim Hee-gon (South Korea)
