= Jorge Karseladze =

Georgian footballer

Personal information
- Date of birth: 18 March 2005 (age 21)
- Place of birth: Póvoa de Varzim, Portugal
- Height: 1.75 m (5 ft 9 in)
- Position: Right-back

Team information
- Current team: Lion City Sailors
- Number: 2

Youth career
- 2013–2023: Rio Ave

Senior career*
Years	Team	Apps	(Gls)
2023–2026	Rio Ave	3	(0)
2025–2026	→ Académica de Coimbra (loan)	8	(0)
2026–	Lion City Sailors	4	(0)

International career^{‡}
2023	Georgia U19	4	(0)
2024–2025	Georgia U21	5	(0)
- * Club domestic league appearances and goals as of 25 October 2026 ‡ National team caps and goals as of 18 November 2025

Jorge Karseladze (Georgian: ჟორჟ ქარსელაძე; born 18 March 2005), sometimes known as just Karse, is a professional footballer who plays as a right-back for Singapore Premier League club Lion City Sailors. Born in Portugal, he is a youth international for Georgia.

== Professional career ==
A youth product of Rio Ave since 2013, Karseladze made his senior and professional debut with Rio Ave as a late substitute in a 3–1 Primeira Liga loss to Paços de Ferreira on 21 May 2023. On 19 July 2023, he signed a professional contract with Rio Ave until 2027. Karse progressed through the club's youth ranks before making three appearances in the Portuguese top flight. He was loaned to Liga 3 outfit Académica de Coimbra for the 2025–26 Liga 3 season, where he featured eight times.

He was announced as a new signing for Singapore Premier League side Lion City Sailors ahead of the 2026–27 season, joining on a 2-year contract.

== International career ==
Born in Portugal, Karseladze is of Georgian descent and holds dual-citizenship. He was called up to the Georgia U19s for a set of friendlies in May 2023, making 2 appearances. He made four appearances in the UEFA European Under-21 Championship qualifiers between September and November 2025.
