= Anderson Lopes =

Brazilian footballer (born 1993)

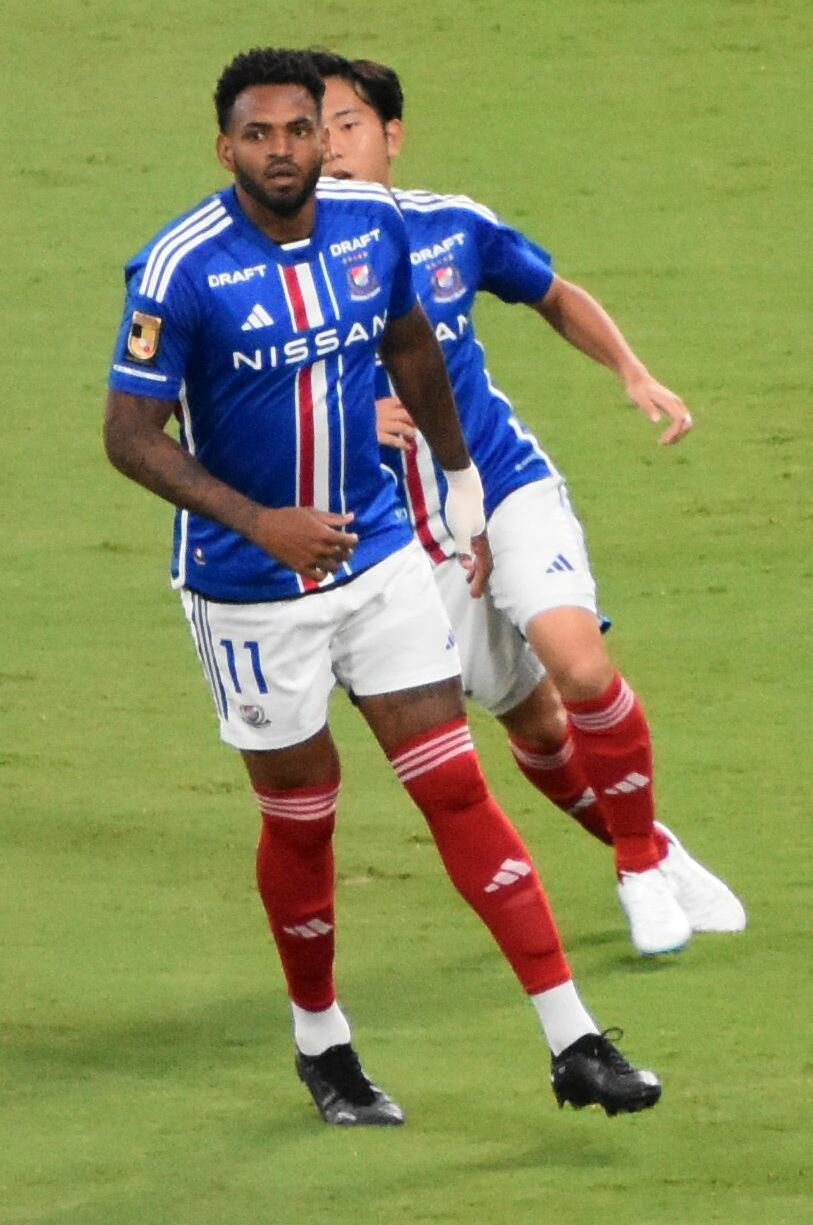
- Lopes playing for Yokohama F. Marinos in 2023

Personal information
- Full name: Anderson José Lopes de Souza
- Date of birth: 15 September 1993 (age 33)
- Place of birth: Recife, Brazil
- Height: 1.85 m (6 ft 1 in)
- Position: Forward

Team information
- Current team: Vissel Kobe
- Number: 9

Youth career
- 2006: Sport Recife
- 2007: São José
- 2007–2011: Internacional
- 2011–2013: Avaí

Senior career*
Years	Team	Apps	(Gls)
2013	Avaí	2	(0)
2014	→ Marcílio Dias (loan)	16	(6)
2014–2018	Tombense	0	(0)
2014–2015	→ Avaí (loan)	70	(15)
2016	→ Atlético Paranaense (loan)	4	(0)
2016–2017	→ Sanfrecce Hiroshima (loan)	39	(12)
2018	→ FC Seoul (loan)	30	(6)
2019–2021	Hokkaido Consadole Sapporo	63	(30)
2021	Wuhan FC	17	(7)
2022–2025	Yokohama F. Marinos	119	(59)
2025–2026	Lion City Sailors	18	(11)
2026–	Vissel Kobe	0	(0)
- * Club domestic league appearances and goals as of 12 July 2026

Anderson José Lopes de Souza (born 15 September 1993) is a Brazilian professional footballer who plays as a forward for J1 League club Vissel Kobe.

== Club career ==
=== Avaí ===
Born in Recife, Pernambuco, Lopes joined Avaí's youth setup in 2011, after starting it out at Internacional. He made his professional debut on 29 November 2013, coming on as a second-half substitute in a 1–0 home win against Boa Esporte.

==== Marcílio Dias (loan) ====
In January 2014, Lopes was loaned to Marcílio Dias. After scoring six goals in only 16 matches, he returned to Avaí, being assigned to the main squad in the second level.

=== Tombense ===
On 17 April 2014, Lopes signed with Série C club Tombense.

==== Avaí (loan) ====
On 1 May 2014, Lopes was loaned out to his former club Avaí. On 14 May 2014, Lopes scored his first goal for his boyhood club by netting a brace in a 2–1 home win against ASA, for the season's Copa do Brasil. He finished the year with 33 league appearances and four goals, also being promoted to Série A.

On 10 May 2015, Lopes made his Série A debut, starting in a 1–1 home draw against Santos.

==== Atlético Paranaense (loan) ====
On 8 January 2016, Lopes joined Atlético Paranaense on a season long loan. He make his debut on 28 January during the Primeira Liga match against Fluminense.

==== Sanfrecce Hiroshima (loan) ====
On 10 July 2016, Lopes moved to Japan to sign with J1 League side Sanfrecce Hiroshima on a two-years loan. He make his debut for the club in a 1–0 lost to Gamba Osaka on 30 July. Lopes then scored a brace for the club in a 4–1 win over Avispa Fukuoka on 29 October.

==== FC Seoul (loan) ====
On 12 February 2018, Lopes joined K League 1 side FC Seoul on loan. He make his debut for the club on 1 March in a goalless draw to Jeju United. Lopes scored a brace where he helped his team to a 2–1 win over Suwon Samsung Bluewings on 5 May. However, in November 2018, Lopes was removed from the matchday squad due to poor attitude where he was thrown to played for the reserves side in which he ended up leaving the club at the end of the 2018 season where he scored 6 times in 30 league appearances.

=== Hokkaido Consadole Sapporo ===
On 1 January 2019, Lopes signed a one-year contract with J1 League side Hokkaido Consadole Sapporo. He make his debut on 23 February in a 2–0 lost to Shonan Bellmare. On 9 March, Lopes scored four goals in one match helping his team to defeat Shimizu S-Pulse 5–2 and famously, during his celebration of scoring his first goal for the club, he misjudged the height of an advertisement board at the home stadium causing him to have a fall. Lopes then extended his contract at the end of the season after finishing with 15 goals in 32 appearances for the club in all competition.

On 20 March 2021, Lopes scored his second career hat-trick in a 4–3 lost to Vissel Kobe.

=== Wuhan FC ===
On 3 July 2021, Lopes signed for Chinese Super League club Wuhan FC during the mid-transfer window of the 2021 season. He make his debut in a goalless draw to Shanghai Port on 19 July. Lopes then scored his first goal for the club against Changchun Yatai in a 2–2 draw on 31 July. He was then named captain during the match against Cangzhou Mighty Lions where he went on to scored a brace in a 4–2 win.

=== Yokohama F. Marinos ===
On 3 February 2022, Lopes was announced that he would transfer to J1 League club Yokohama F. Marinos for the 2022 season. He made his debut with the club on 19 February where he recorded 1 goal and 1 assist in the match against Cerezo Osaka in a 2–2 draw. On 19 April, Lopes make his AFC Champions League debut in a 1–0 lost to Korean club Jeonbuk Hyundai Motors but he didn't take it long where he scored his first goal in the competition in a 3–0 win over Australian club Sydney FC on 25 April. Although he had been performing well since from the start of the season, he was sent off for spitting on opposing defender Daiki Miya in a match against Avispa Fukuoka in Matchweek 14. He was suspended for 6 games and fined 600,000 yen. He ended his first season with 11 league goals, the joint most at the club and helped to win the 2022 J1 League title.

In his second season with Yokohama F. Marinos, Lopes continued where he left off in the 2022 season on the scoring charts. He ended the season with 22 league goals, the joint most in the league alongside Yuya Osako in the 2023 season. He was also named in the 'Best XI' for the season also helping his team to win the 2023 Japanese Super Cup.

In the 2024 season, Lopes finished the season with 24 league goals retaining his top scorer award where he notably score a hat-trick against Kashiwa Reysol on 29 May in a 4–0 win and also on 16 November in a 4–3 away win against Júbilo Iwata. He was then named in the 'Best XI' for the second time. Lopes also guided his team all the way to the 2023–24 AFC Champions League final where Yokohama F. Marinos ended up as the runners-up.

In Lopes last match for the club against rivals Yokohama FC on 5 July 2025, he scored the only goal in the match to win the three points for the club. He left the club after scoring 81 goals and providing 20 assists in 157 appearances for the club in all competition.

=== Lion City Sailors ===
On 17 July 2025, Singapore Premier League club Lion City Sailors confirmed the signing of Lopes for an undisclosed fee, with the forward signing a three-year contract receiving an annual salary of approximately $3 million which is double what he earns in Japan, even though he is the highest-paid player in the J1 League. On 22 September, he scored a brace in a 7–0 thrashing win over Tanjong Pagar United. During the AFC Champions League Two group stage fixtures against Malaysian club Selangor on 1 October, Anderson scored four goals helping LCS to a 4–2 win. During the 2025–26 Singapore Cup final on 10 January 2026, Anderson scored a goal in extra time which secured a 2–0 win against Tampines Rovers which sees Lion City Sailors retaining their cup three in a row. He made 34 appearances for the Sailors in total, scoring 19 goals and providing three assists across all competitions.

=== Vissel Kobe ===
On 26 June 2026, Anderson was announced to have completed a move to J1 League side Vissel Kobe for an undisclosed fee.

== Career statistics ==
As of 1 Oct 2025

Appearances and goals by club, season and competition
Club	Season	League			National cup (Note: Includes Copa do Brasil, Emperor's Cup, Korean FA Cup, Chinese FA Cup)		League cup (Note: Includes J.League Cup)		Continental		State league (Note: Includes Campeonato Catarinense, Campeonato Paranaense)		Other		Total	
Club	Season	Division	Apps	Goals	Apps	Goals	Apps	Goals	Apps	Goals	Apps	Goals	Apps	Goals	Apps	Goals
Avaí	2013	Série B	1	0	0	0	—		—		1	0	—		2	0
Marcílio Dias	2014	Campeonato Catarinense	—		0	0	—		—		16	6	—		16	6
Tombense	2014	Série D	0	0	0	0	—		—		0	0	—		0	0
Avaí (loan)	2014	Série B	33	4	3	2	—		—		0	0	—		36	6
Avaí (loan)	2015	Série A	19	5	4	2	—		—		10	6	—		33	13
Avaí (loan)	Total		52	9	7	4	—		—		10	6	—		69	19
Atlético Paranaense (loan)	2016	Série A	4	0	2	1	—		—		10	1	3	0	19	2
Sanfrecce Hiroshima (loan)	2016	J1 League	7	2	2	0	0	0	—		—		—		9	2
Sanfrecce Hiroshima (loan)	2017	J1 League	32	10	2	0	5	0	—		—		—		39	10
FC Seoul (loan)	2018	K League 1	30	6	1	1	—		—		—		—		31	7
Hokkaido Consadole Sapporo	2019	J1 League	25	9	1	0	6	6	—		—		—		32	15
Hokkaido Consadole Sapporo	2020	J1 League	24	9	—		3	1	—		—		—		27	10
Hokkaido Consadole Sapporo	2021	J1 League	14	12	0	0	2	2	—		—		—		16	14
Hokkaido Consadole Sapporo	Total		63	30	1	0	11	9	—		—		—		75	39
Wuhan FC	2021	Chinese Super League	17	7	1	0	—		—		—		—		18	7
Yokohama F. Marinos	2022	J1 League	28	11	0	0	2	0	4 (Note: Appearances in AFC Champions League)	3	—		—		34	14
Yokohama F. Marinos	2023	J1 League	34	22	0	0	5	2	3	2	—		1 (Note: Appearance in Japanese Super Cup)	0	43	26
Yokohama F. Marinos	2024	J1 League	37	24	2	1	3	1	13	10	—		0	0	55	36
Yokohama F. Marinos	2025	J1 League	20	2	0	0	0	0	5	3	—		—		25	5
Yokohama F. Marinos	Total		119	59	2	1	10	3	25	18	—		1	0	157	81
Lion City Sailors	2025–26	Singapore Premier League	19	11	3	2	0	0	6 (Note: 1 Appearance in Shopee Cup & 2 Appearances in AFC2)	5 (Note: 4 goals in AFC2)	—		0	0	7	6
Career total			342	134	21	9	36	12	27	22	37	13	4	0	442	160

== Honours ==
=== Club ===
==== Yokohama F. Marinos ====
- J1 League: 2022
- Japanese Super Cup: 2023
- AFC Champions League runners-up: 2023–24

Lion City Sailors

- Singapore Community Shield runner-up: 2025
- Singapore Cup: 2025–26
- Singapore Premier League: 2025–26

=== Individual ===
- J.League Top Scorer: 2023, 2024
- J.League Best XI: 2023 , 2024
