= Luka Lalić =

Serbian football manager

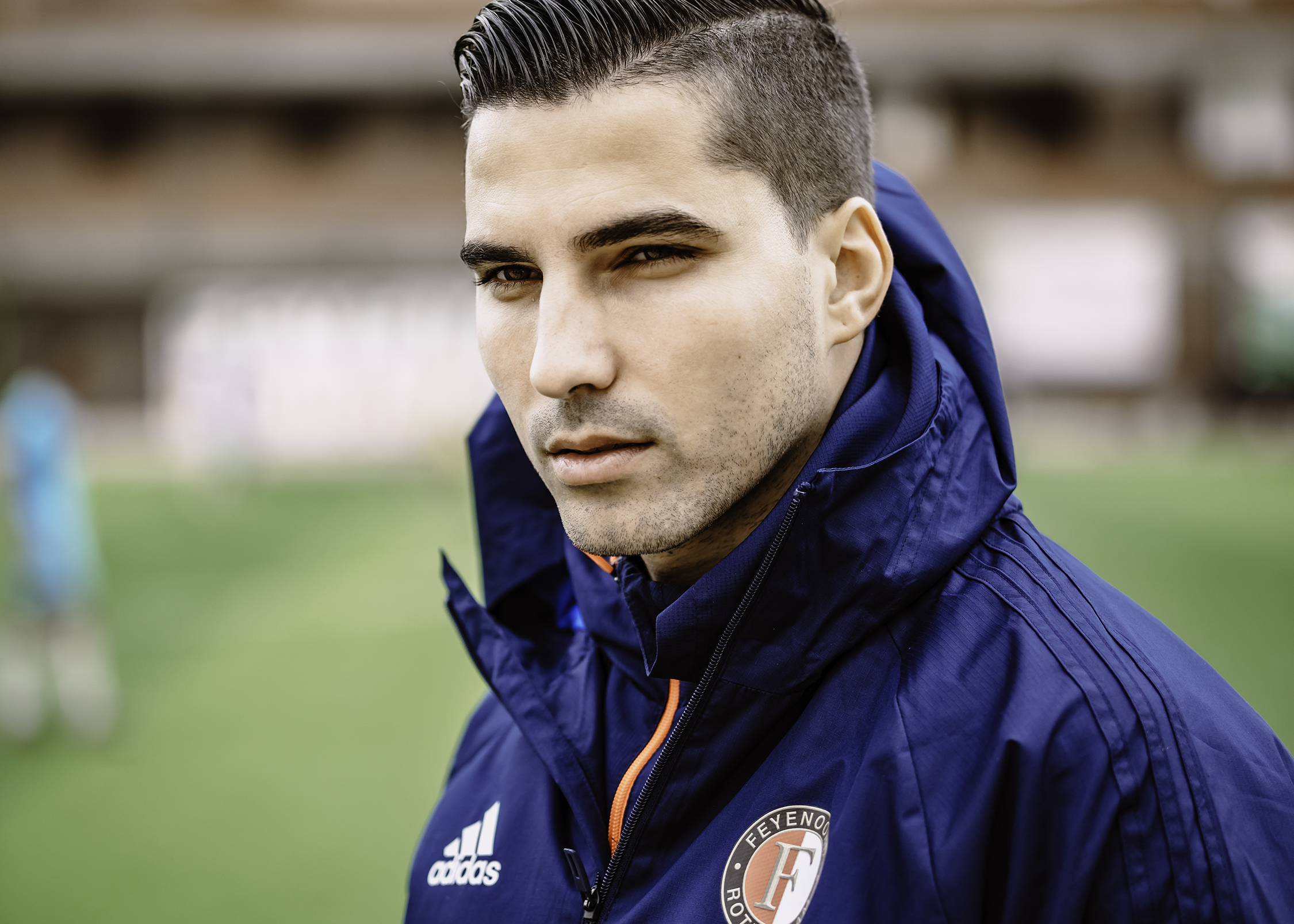

Personal information
- Full name: Luka Lalić
- Date of birth: 20 May 1987 (age 39)
- Place of birth: Belgrade, SR Serbia, Yugoslavia
- Height: 1.92 m (6 ft 4 in)
- Position: Centre back

Team information
- Current team: Lion City Sailors (Director of Football)

Senior career*
Years	Team	Apps	(Gls)
2005–2006	FK Voždovac	6	(0)

International career
2004–2005	Serbia U17	3	(0)

Managerial career
- 2008: FK Partizan (volunteer)
- 2008–2011: AFC (individual coach)
- 2011–2013: Balestier Khalsa (fitness coach)
- 2013–2014: Woodlands Wellington (assistant)
- 2011–2016: Turf City (youth coach)
- 2016–2020: Feyenoord (youth coach)
- 2020–2022: Lion City Sailors (academy director)
- 2022: Lion City Sailors (interim)
- 2023–2025: Lion City Sailors (Technical Director)
- 2026–: Lion City Sailors (Director of Football)
- * Club domestic league appearances and goals

Luka Lalić (Serbian Cyrillic: Лука Лалић) is a Serbian football manager currently working as Technical Director of Singapore Premier League club Lion City Sailors.

== Managerial career ==
Lalić began his professional career with FK Voždovac, making his first-team debut at the age of 17. His playing career ended prematurely due to a heart condition. Following his recovery, he transitioned to coaching, developing several programs focused on improving players' physical performance. During this period, he also worked as a volunteer coach with FK Partizan.

=== Asia ===
After short-term coaching roles across Asia, Lalić relocated to Singapore, where he founded Turf City Football Academy. Concurrently, he worked with Balestier Khalsa as part of the coaching staff that won the Singapore League Cup in 2013, followed by a spell with Woodlands Wellington in 2014.

Under Lalić's leadership, Turf City teams competed in tournaments across Western Europe, with several players progressing to professional clubs, including Manchester City, Feyenoord, Fulham, Wolverhampton Wanderers, and Leeds United.

=== Feyenoord ===
During a European tour with Turf City in 2016, Lalić was offered a coaching internship at the Feyenoord Academy by then-technical director Martin van Geel. He later accepted a role as international development coach and, in 2017, was appointed Head of Methodology. In this capacity, he was responsible for implementing Feyenoord's global academy programs. Lalić left the club in May 2020 to return to Asia.

=== Lion City Sailors ===
In June 2020, Lalić was appointed Academy Technical Director of Lion City Sailors. On 12 August 2022, following the departure of Kim Do-hoon, he was named interim head coach. In his first match, Lalić guided the team to a 10–1 victory, the largest in the club's history, followed by wins over Tanjong Pagar United (7–0) and Hougang United (9–4).

He resumed his Technical Director role at the start of the 2023 season.

As Technical Director, Lalić led a restructuring of the club’s squad, technical staff, and operations. Under his leadership, Lion City Sailors won multiple domestic trophies and reached the final of the 2024–25 AFC Champions League Two, marking the first time a Singaporean club achieved this milestone.
