= Nathan Mao =

Singaporean footballer (born 2008)

Personal information
- Full name: Nathan Mao Zhi Xuan
- Date of birth: 26 March 2008 (age 18)
- Place of birth: Singapore
- Position: Forward

Team information
- Current team: Young Lions (on loan from Lion City Sailors)
- Number: 33

Youth career
- 2020–2023: Lion City Sailors

Senior career*
Years	Team	Apps	(Gls)
2023–	Lion City Sailors	3	(0)
2025–	→ Young Lions (loan)	0	(0)

International career^{‡}
2023–2024	Singapore U16	2	(0)
2025–	Singapore U23	2	(0)
2026–	Singapore	1	(0)
- * Club domestic league appearances and goals as of 9 April 2025 ‡ National team caps and goals as of 2 April 2026

Nathan Mao Zhi Xuan (born 26 March 2008) is a Singaporean professional footballer who plays as a forward for Singapore Premier League club Young Lions, on loan from Lion City Sailors, and the Singapore national team.

Mao currently holds the record of being the youngest player to play in the Singapore Premier League at 15 years and 5 days in the match against Tampines Rovers.

== Early life ==
Mao started playing football at the age of four. He attended Zhonghua Secondary School.

== Club career ==
=== Lion City Sailors ===
As a youth product, Mao joined the academy of Lion City Sailors in 2020, when he was eight.

In November 2021, while he was in the LCS Academy U14 Elite squad, Mao was sent abroad for a six-week European training camp in Germany and Netherlands. He was sent overseas again from 29 October to 14 November 2022 to embark on a 16-day training stint at the Feyenoord Academy when he was in the U17 Elite squad.

On 31 March 2023, Mao became Singapore Premier League's youngest debutant at 15 years and 5 days old when he was introduced as a substitute against Tampines Rovers. Mao was first involved in the continental stage when he was part of Lion City Sailors' squad in the 2023–24 AFC Champions League campaign. He made into head coach Aleksandar Ranković's matchday 1 squad in the 2–1 defeat to Bangkok United. He became the youngest player to be named in an AFC Champions League Elite matchday squad since 2012 at 15 years and 178 days old, surpassing Suphanat Mueanta's 15 years and 203 days record.

On 16 September 2023, Mao assisted Haiqal Pashia in the stoppage time to secure a 3–1 league win over Geylang International.

==== Loan to Young Lions ====
In July 2025, Mao was loaned to Young Lions.

== International career ==
=== Youth ===
In 2023, Mao was part of the Singapore U15 squad for the Lion City Cup (LCC). During the semi-finals, he scored a brace in the 3–1 win over Selangor FC. In the LCC final match against Thailand's BG Pathum, Singapore U-15 conceded an own goal early in the match and Mao helped to equalised late in the match with a corner kick which goalkeeper Kittiphob Poomee could not parry out of the goal. BG Pathum eventually won the final 4–3 on penalty kicks.

Mao was called up to the Singapore U16 squad for the 2024 ASEAN U-16 Boys Championship held in Indonesia.

=== Senior ===
On 23 March 2026, Nathan was first called up to the Singapore national team, for the AFC Asian Cup Qualifiers against Bangladesh. Nathan made his debut, coming on in the 65th minute to replace Ikhsan Fandi.

== Career statistics ==
=== Club ===
As of match played 9 April 2025

Appearances and goals by club, season and competition
Club	Season	League			National cup		League cup		Continental		Other		Total	
Club	Season	Division	Apps	Goals	Apps	Goals	Apps	Goals	Apps	Goals	Apps	Goals	Apps	Goals
Lion City Sailors	2023	Singapore Premier League	3	0	4	0	0	0	0	0	—		0	0
Lion City Sailors	2024–25	Singapore Premier League	0	0	4	0	0	0	0	0	—		11	0
Lion City Sailors	Total		3	0	8	0	0	0	0	0	0	0	11	0
Career total			3	0	8	0	0	0	4	0	0	0	11	0

== Honours ==
=== Lion City Sailors ===
- Singapore Premier League: 2024–25
- Singapore Cup: 2023
- Singapore Community Shield: 2024
