= Jonan Tan =

Singaporean footballer (born 2006)

Personal information
- Full name: Jonan Tan En Yuan
- Date of birth: 27 June 2006 (age 20)
- Place of birth: Singapore
- Positions: Midfielder; forward

Team information
- Current team: Dugopolje (on loan from Lion City Sailors)

Youth career
- 2020–2023: Lion City Sailors

Senior career*
Years	Team	Apps	(Gls)
2023–	Lion City Sailors	2	(0)
2024–2025	→ Young Lions (loan)	10	(0)
2025	→ Estrela da Amadora (loan)	0	(0)
2025–2026	→ Vizela (loan)	0	(0)
2026–	→ Dugopolje (loan)	0	(0)

International career^{‡}
2022	Singapore U16	5	(1)
2024–2025	Singapore U19	3	(0)
2024–2025	Singapore U20	3	(0)
2024–	Singapore U23	3	(0)
- * Club domestic league appearances and goals as of 5 July 2025 ‡ National team caps and goals as of 10 September 2025

Jonan Tan En Yuan (born 27 June 2006) is a Singaporean professional footballer who plays as a midfielder or forward for First League club Dugopolje, on loan from Singapore Premier League club Lion City Sailors.

== Club career ==
=== Lion City Sailors ===
Jonan joined Lion City Sailors youth academy and were part of the first Scholars from the Sailors' Elite Development Programme launched in 2020. In 2022, Jonan was selected as one of the four academy players given the opportunity to train Atlético Madrid's youth academies. Jonan was attached to the under-17 "B" team.

On 24 February 2023, Jonan made his debut as a substitute in a league match against Tanjong Pagar United, which ended in a 3–1 win. He made his debut aged 16 years, 7 months and 28 days. Jonan made his second appearance on 18 March 2023 in a 3–0 win against Blaestier Khalsa.

==== Loan to Young Lions ====
Jonan was loaned to Young Lions ahead of the 2024–25 season. He made his debut on 11 May 2024 against Brunei DPMM, in which he started the match. He made a total of 10 appearances before his transfer to Portugal.

==== Loan to Estrela da Amadora ====
Midway through the 2024–25 season, it was announced that Jonan was sent on loan to Primeira Liga side Estrela da Amadora in the Portuguese top flight, months after fellow Lion City Sailors teammate Nur Muhammad Asis. Jonan featured primarily in the club's under-23 side playing in the Liga Revelação U23. Jonan made his debut in a 2–1 defeat to Famalicão U23 on 15 April 2025. He made his second appearance, which was his last appearance for the club, a week later against Sporting CP U23.

==== 2025–26: Loan to Vizela ====
Jonan was loaned to Liga Portugal 2 side Vizela ahead of the 2025–26 season. Jonan will join fellow Singaporean and former Lion City Sailors teammate Khairin Nadim for the season in the Liga Revelação U23. Jonan made his debut in a 4–0 defeat to Academico Viseu U23 on 23 September 2025. He made his second appearance, a week later on 30 September 2025 against Maritimo U23 and recorded a assist in a 2-0 win.

2026–27: Loan to NK Dugopolje

Following stints with Portuguese clubs, Jonan Tan continued his football development in Europe after securing a season-long loan move to Croatian second-tier side NK Dugopolje. Contracted with the Sailors until 2029, he went for a two-week trial with Dugopolje in May and did enough with his technical quality, deft touches and versatility to earn a loan move.

== International career ==
Jonan was called up to the Singapore under-16 in 2022. Jonan scored his first goal at the 2022 AFF U-16 Youth Championship match against Philippines. The match ended in a 2–1 lost to Singapore. Jonan was also called up to the Singapore under-19 for the 2024 ASEAN U-19 Boys Championship. He was then called up to represent the Singapore under-20 for the 2025 AFC U-20 Asian Cup qualification. In 2025, he was called up to represent the Singapore under-23 for the 2026 AFC U-23 Asian Cup qualification.

On 29 September 2025, Jonan was first called up to the Singapore senior team for the 2027 AFC Asian Cup qualification matches against India on 9 and 14 October.

== Career statistics ==
=== Club ===
As of match played 5 July 2025

Appearances and goals by club, season and competition
Club	Season	League			National cup		League cup		Continental		Other		Total	
Club	Season	Division	Apps	Goals	Apps	Goals	Apps	Goals	Apps	Goals	Apps	Goals	Apps	Goals
Lion City Sailors	2023	Singapore Premier League	2	0	0	0	0	0	0	0	—		2	0
Lion City Sailors	Total		2	0	0	0	0	0	0	0	0	0	2	0
Young Lions (loan)	2024–25	Singapore Premier League	10	0	0	0	0	0	—		—		10	0
Estrela da Amadora (loan)	2024–25	Liga Revelação	2	0	0	0	0	0	—		—		2	0
Vizela (loan)	2025–26	Liga Revelação	2	0	0	0	0	0	—		—		2	0
Career total			16	0	0	0	0	0	0	0	0	0	12	0

- Young Lions are ineligible for qualification to AFC competitions in their respective leagues.
