= Diogo Costa (footballer, born July 2003) =

Portuguese footballer

Personal information
- Full name: Diogo Filipe Pinto Costa
- Date of birth: 27 July 2003 (age 23)
- Place of birth: Vila Nova de Famalicão, Portugal
- Height: 1.80 m (5 ft 11 in)
- Position: Left-back

Team information
- Current team: Lion City Sailors
- Number: 29

Youth career
- 2012–2016: AC Elite Sport
- 2016–2021: Famalicão

Senior career*
Years	Team	Apps	(Gls)
2021–2025	Famalicão	0	(0)
2023–2024	→ Académica (loan)	12	(0)
2025	→ Lion City Sailors (loan)	9	(0)
2025–	Lion City Sailors	31	(4)
- * Club domestic league appearances and goals as of 1 November 2026

Diogo Filipe Pinto Costa (born 27 July 2003) is a Portuguese professional footballer who plays primarily as a left-back for Singapore Premier League club Lion City Sailors.

== Club career ==
=== Famalicão ===
Costa has been with Famalicão since his teenage years. He progressed through the ranks and represented the club in various age levels, from under-15, under-17, under-19, and under-23 national competitions, captaining nearly every age group he has played in. Costa signed his first professional contract on 3 September 2021. He then signed a contract extension till 2026 on 21 March 2023.

==== 2023–24: Loan to Académica ====
Costa was loaned to Portuguese third tier club Académica in the second half of the 2023–24 campaign. He made a total of 12 appearances for the club.

==== 2024–25: Called up to senior side and loan to Lion City Sailors ====
Costa mainly played in the Liga Revelação. He was also named on the bench three times for Famalicão's senior side in the first half of the 2024–25 Primeira Liga season. He wore the number 75 for the senior side.

In the second half of the season, Singapore Premier League club Lion City Sailors announced the signing of Costa on loan from Famalicão until the end of the 2024–25 Singapore Premier League season on 25 January 2025. Costa made his Singapore Premier League debut on 26 January 2025, in a 2–1 win against Geylang International. Costa made his AFC Champions League Two debut in the first leg of the Round of 16 match against Muangthong United. Costa won his side a penalty after a mazy run into the box. Despite being a man down early in the second half, Diogo demonstrated his defensive prowess, playing a key role to protect their lead. The matched eventually ended in a 3–2 victory to the Sailors.

Costa made a hat-trick of assists, all for Lennart Thy, in a 8–0 win over Young Lions on 6 April 2025.

Costa made two assists for Bart Ramselaar and Lennart Thy in the first leg of the AFC Champions League Two semi-finals against Sydney FC. The matched ended in a 2–0 win at Jalan Besar Stadium. Despite a 1–0 defeat to Sydney at the Allianz Stadium, Costa helped the Sailors to create history, booking their spot in the final with a 2-1 aggregate victory in the semi-finals. Costa assisted Lestienne in the final against Sharjah. However, the Sailors were unable to hold on and eventually conceded in the 97th minute to finish the game in a 1–2 defeat. Costa made 4 assists in 7 games in the Champions League Two campaign. Costa scored his first professional goal in the second leg of the semi-final match against DPMM in the 2024–25 Singapore Cup.

Costa ended the season winning the Singapore Premier League, the Singapore Cup and finished as a runner-up in the AFC Champions League Two. He recorded 11 assists in 21 games across all competitions.

=== Lion City Sailors ===
On 8 July 2025, it was announced that Costa would be staying at the Singaporean club after signing a permanent five-year contract. Costa scored his first league game in a 7–0 victory against Tanjong Pagar United on 22 September.

== Style of play ==
Costa is a modern-day full-back where his speed, aggression, and dead-ball abilities aids him in his role on the team. He is able to deliver pinpoint crosses, and quality set-pieces.

== Career statistics ==
=== Club ===
As of match played 30 May 2026

Appearances and goals by club, season and competition
Club	Season	League			National cup		League cup		Continental		Other		Total	
Club	Season	Division	Apps	Goals	Apps	Goals	Apps	Goals	Apps	Goals	Apps	Goals	Apps	Goals
Famalicão	2023–24	Primeira Liga	0	0	0	0	0	0	0	0	—		0	0
Famalicão	2024–25	Primeira Liga	0	0	0	0	0	0	0	0	—		0	0
Famalicão	Total		0	0	0	0	0	0	0	0	0	0	0	0
Académica (loan)	2023–24	Liga 3	12	0	0	0	0	0	0	0	—		12	0
Lion City Sailors (loan)	2024–25	Singapore Premier League	9	0	5	1	0	0	7 (Note: Appearance(s) in AFC Champions League Two)	0	—		21	1
Lion City Sailors	2025–26	Singapore Premier League	18	4	3	0	1	0	6	0	6 (Note: five appearances in ASEAN Club Championship, and one appearance in Singapore Community Shield)	0	33	4
Career total			39	4	8	1	1	0	13	0	6	0	66	5

== Honours ==
Lion City Sailors

- AFC Champions League Two runner-up: 2024–25
- Singapore Premier League: 2024–25
- Singapore Cup: 2024–25, 2025–26
- Singapore Community Shield runner-up: 2025
