= Nur Muhammad Asis =

Singaporean footballer (born 2004)

Asis Ijilrali
Personal information
- Full name: Nur Muhammad Asis Ijilrali Bin Junaidi
- Date of birth: 4 March 2004 (age 22)
- Place of birth: Singapore
- Height: 1.68 m (5 ft 6 in)
- Position: Midfielder

Team information
- Current team: Lion City Sailors
- Number: 22

Youth career
- –2016: Turf City
- 2017: NFA
- 2018–2024: Lion City Sailors

Senior career*
Years	Team	Apps	(Gls)
2023–	Lion City Sailors	6	(0)
2024–2025	→ Estrela da Amadora (loan)	0	(0)
2025–2026	→ Vizela (loan)	0	(0)

International career^{‡}
2022	Singapore U19	4	(0)
2022	Singapore U20	2	(0)
2023–	Singapore U23	6	(0)
- * Club domestic league appearances and goals as of 11 October 2026 ‡ National team caps and goals as of 16 November 2025

Nur Muhammad Asis Ijilrali Bin Junaidi (born 4 April 2004), also known as Asis Ijilrali, is a Singaporean professional footballer who plays as a midfielder for Singapore Premier League club Lion City Sailors.

== Club career ==
=== Youth ===
As a youth player, Asis joined the youth academy of Singaporean side Turf City. While playing for the club, he was invited by Turkish side Galatasaray and Dutch side Feyenoord to train with their youth academies. In 2017, Asis joined the NFA, a youth academy founded by the Football Association of Singapore, before joining the youth academy of Singaporean side Lion City Sailors, where he started his senior career, becoming the first youth academy player to sign a professional contract with them.

=== Lion City Sailors ===
On 1 July 2023, Asis come on as a substitute in the last 5 minute of the match in a league game against Tanjong Pagar United. On 26 July, he came on as a substitution in a friendly match against English giants Tottenham Hotspurs at the Singapore National Stadium.

During a league match against Young Lions on 22 July 2024, Asis recorded his first assist in the 90+3 stoppage time to Hami Syahin in a 6–0 win.

==== Loan to Estrela da Amadora ====
On 31 July 2024, it was announced that he was sent on loan to Primeira Liga side Estrela da Amadora, becoming the first Singaporean player to sign for a Portuguese top flight side. Asis trained with the B team and was featured more in the club under-23 side playing in the Liga Revelação U23.

Asis would often play as the captain, which built his self-belief, and on 28 September, Asis finally made his debut for the under-23s, when he came on as a late substitute in a 1–0 Liga Revelação victory over Benfica U23. On 26 November, he recorded a brace of assists with both goal scored by Simão Pedro in a 3–2 win against Estoril U23. Asis finished the season with 14 appearances in the Liga Revelação.

==== 2025–26: Loan to Vizela ====
Asis was then transferred and loaned to Liga Portugal 2 side Vizela ahead of the 2025–26 season. Asis will join fellow Singaporeans and former Lion City Sailors teammates Khairin Nadim and Jonan Tan for the season in the Liga Revelação U23.

== International career ==
Asis has represented Singapore internationally at under-19, under-20, and under-23 level. Altogether, he has made six appearances for the under-19 and under-20 teams combined, and has played for the under-23 team for 2024 AFC U-23 Asian Cup qualification.

== Career statistics ==
=== Club ===
As of match played 18 May 2025

Appearances and goals by club, season and competition
Club	Season	League			National cup		League cup		Continental		Other		Total	
Club	Season	Division	Apps	Goals	Apps	Goals	Apps	Goals	Apps	Goals	Apps	Goals	Apps	Goals
Lion City Sailors	2023	Singapore Premier League	3	0	0	0	0	0	0	0	—		3	0
Lion City Sailors	2024–25	Singapore Premier League	2	0	0	0	0	0	0	0	—		2	0
Lion City Sailors	Total		5	0	0	0	0	0	0	0	0	0	5	0
Estrela da Amadora (loan)	2024–25	Primeira Liga	0	0	0	0	0	0	—		—		0	0
Vizela (loan)	2025–26	Liga Portugal 2	0	0	0	0	0	0	—		—		0	0
Career total			5	0	0	0	0	0	0	0	0	0	5	0
