= 2024 Albirex Niigata (S) Women season =

Albirex Niigata (S)
2024 season
- Chairman: Daisuke Korenaga
- Head coach: (Japan) Kana Kitahara
- Premier League: 2nd
- Top goalscorer: Manami Fukuzawa (23 goals)

The 2024 season was Albirex Niigata (S) Women's third consecutive season in the top flight of Singapore football, the Women's Premier League.

== Review ==
Kana Kitahara doubled up as a player-head coach for Albirex.

=== First-team transfers ===
Albirex signed 17 players, including Ernie Sontaril, Nur Izzati Rosni and Lila Tan from Lion City Sailors. 2022 WPL Player of the Year Manami Fukuzawa, 2022 Young Player of the Year Haziqah Haszman, Singapore national skipper Siti Rosnani Azman and 2023 Young Player of the Year Dhaniyah Qasimah also joined the team. Ernie, Izzati and Fukuzawa expressed that new head coach Kitahara was the reason for joining Albirex, to be trained by her and learn from her international experience.

== Squad ==
=== Women squad ===
As of 5 February 2022

Squad No.	Name	Nationality	Date of birth (age)	Previous club	Contract start	Contract end
Goalkeepers
20	Nurul Haziqah	(Singapore)	29 April 2003 (age 23)	(Singapore) Tanjong Pagar United (W)	2024	2024
21	Lutfiah Hannah	(Singapore)	6 February 2001 (age 25)	(Singapore) JSSL Tampines	2024	2024
	Eng Chiu	(Singapore)		(Singapore) Balestier Khalsa (W)	2024	2024
Defenders
3	Nabilla Aina	(Singapore)	12 March 1999 (age 27)	(Singapore) Home United (W)	2024	2024
5	Irsalina Irwan	(Singapore)	1 January 2007 (age 19)	(United States) IMG Academy	2024	2024
13	Sun Jie	(Singapore) (China)	31 July 1985 (age 41)	(Singapore)	2023	2024
23	Rebecca Harding	(Malaysia)	23 April 1985 (age 41)	(Singapore) Mattar Sailors (W)	2024	2024
54	Dini Danisha	(Singapore)	6 April 2003 (age 23)	(Singapore) Home United (W)	2022	2024
99	Rosnani Azman	(Singapore)	22 May 1997 (age 29)	(Singapore) Hougang United (W)	2024	2024
Midfielders
8	Noralinda Wahab	(Singapore)	8 March 1994 (age 32)	(Singapore) Kaki Bukit SC (W)	2022	2024
10	Izzati Rosni	(Singapore)	24 May 1999 (age 27)	(Singapore) Lion City Sailors (W)	2024	2024
14	Kana Kitahara	(Japan)	7 December 1988 (age 37)	(Japan) MyNavi Sendai	2022	2024
15	Janet Tan	(Singapore)	6 November 2007 (age 18)	(Singapore) Turf City FC	2024	2024
17	Dhaniyah Qasimah	(Singapore)	7 July 2004 (age 22)	(Singapore) Tanjong Pagar United (W)	2024	2024
19	Nur Dawisyah Noor Haidi	(Singapore)	22 July 2001 (age 25)	(Singapore) Royal Arion WFC	2024	2024
22	Nurul Unaisah	(Singapore)	12 July 2003 (age 23)	(Singapore) Euro Soccer Academy	2022	2024
29	Mulan Ayliffe	(Singapore)	10 May 2008 (age 18)	(Singapore) Turf City Academy	2024	2024
30	Nurzaherra Maisarah	(Singapore)	21 October 2006 (age 19)	(Singapore) Police SA (W)	2024	2024
32	Afiqah Omar	(Singapore)	15 October 2001 (age 24)	(Singapore) JSSL Tampines	2024	2024
88	Ernie Sulastri	(Singapore)	24 November 1988 (age 37)	(Singapore) Lion City Sailors (W)	2024	2024
Strikers
2	Yuki Monden	(Japan)	14 March 1980 (age 46)	(Singapore) Tanjong Pagar United (W)	2024	2024
6	Lila Tan Hui Ying	(Singapore) (France)	4 June 2003 (age 23)	(Singapore) Lion City Sailors (W)	2024	2024
7	Huraizah Ismail	(Singapore)	2 June 1984 (age 42)	(Singapore) Police SA (W)	2022	2024
18	Manami Fukuzawa	(Japan)	2 May 1991 (age 35)	(Singapore) Tanjong Pagar United (W)	2024	2024
Players who left club during season
25	Maisarah Ramat	(Singapore)	16 October 1993 (age 32)	(Singapore) Ottawa Serpent FC	2022	2024
4	Faradila Rafidi	(Singapore)	15 October 1998 (age 27)	(Singapore) Tanjong Pagar United (W)	2024	2024
5	Cynthia Taye Shi Ya	(Singapore)	17 February 1984 (age 42)	(Singapore) GFA Football	2022	2024
9	Nadhra Aqilah	(Singapore)	12 April 1994 (age 32)	(Singapore) Tanjong Pagar United (W)	2022	2024
11	Nahwah Aidilreza	(Singapore)	4 May 2007 (age 19)	(Singapore) JSSL Tampines	2024	2024
45	Rabi'atul Ardawiyah	(Singapore)	19 September 2003 (age 23)	(Singapore) JSSL Tampines	2024	2024

== Coaching staff ==
First Team

Position	Name
Technical Director	(Japan) Kazuaki Yoshinaga
Team Manager (Men)	(Singapore) Dominic Wong
Team Manager (Women)	
Head Coach (Men)	(Japan) Kazuaki Yoshinaga
Head Coach (Women)	(Japan) Kana Kitahara
Assistant Coach (Men)	(Japan) Keiji Shigetomi (Singapore) Jaswinder Singh
Assistant Coach (Women)	(Singapore) Toni Teo (Singapore) Melisa Ye
Goalkeeper Coach (Men)	(Singapore) Fadhil Salim
Goalkeeper Coach (Women)	(Singapore) Bryan Quek
Fitness Coach (Men)	(Japan) Masayuki Kato
Fitness Coach (Women)	
Sports Trainer	(Singapore) Kyler Wong Yiming
Physiotherapist	(Singapore) Karen Koh (Singapore) Alison Soh
Kitman	(Singapore) Roy Krishnan (Singapore) Muhammad Taufik
Interpreter	(Japan) Masayuki Kato

Academy

Position	Name
Head of Youth	(Spain) Marcal Trulls
Under-21 Head Coach	(Singapore) Jaswinder Singh
Under-17 Head Coach	(Spain) Marcal Trulls
Under-15 Head Coach	(Japan) Masayuki Kato
Under-21 Asst Coach	(Singapore) Nas
Under-17 Asst Coach	(Japan) Keiji Shigetomi
Under-15 Asst Coach	(Singapore) Tyrus Soo (Singapore) Nurhalis Azmi
Goalkeeper Coach (Under-21)	(Singapore) Fadhil Salim
Goalkeeper Coach (Under-17 & Under-15)	(Singapore) Hyrulnizam Juma'at
Under-21 Fitness Coach	(Singapore) Sufian
Under-21 Trainer	(Singapore) Xin Yu

== Transfer ==
=== In ===
Preseason

Position	Player	Transferred from	Team	Ref
GK	(Singapore) Nurul Haziqah	(Singapore) Tanjong Pagar United (W)	Women	Free
GK	(Singapore) Lutfiah Hannah	(Singapore) JSSL Tampines	Women	Free
DF	(Singapore) Rabi'atul Ardawiyah	(Singapore) JSSL Tampines	Women	Free
DF	(Singapore) Rosnani Azman	(Singapore) Hougang United (W)	Women	Free
DF	(Malaysia) Rebecca Jane Harding	(Singapore) Mattar Sailors (W)	Women	Free
DF	(Singapore) Ernie Sulastri Sontaril	(Singapore) Lion City Sailors (W)	Women	Free
DF	(Singapore) Nabilla Aina	N.A.	Women	Free
MF	(Singapore) Mulan Ayliffe	(Singapore) Turf City Academy	Women	Free
MF	(Singapore) Nurzaherra Maisarah	(Singapore) Police SA	Women	Free
MF	(Singapore) Afiqah Omar	(Singapore) JSSL Tampines	Women	Free
MF	(Singapore) Dhaniyah Qasimah	(Singapore) Tanjong Pagar United (W)	Women	Free
MF	(Singapore) Faradila Rafidi	(Singapore) Tanjong Pagar United (W)	Women	Free
MF	(Japan) Manami Fukuzawa	(Singapore) Tanjong Pagar United (W)	Women	Free
FW	(Japan) Yuki Monden	(Singapore) Tanjong Pagar United (W)	Women	Free
FW	(Singapore) Nahwah Aidilreza	(Singapore) JSSL Tampines	Women	Free
FW	(Singapore) Nur Izzati Rosni	(Singapore) Lion City Sailors (W)	Women	Free
FW	(Singapore) (France) Lila Tan	(Singapore) Lion City Sailors (W)	Women	Free

Note 1:

Mid-season

Position	Player	Transferred from	Team	Ref
GK	(Singapore) Eng Chiu	(Singapore) Balestier Khalsa (W)	Women	Free
MF	(Singapore) Nur Dawisyah Noor Haidi	(Singapore) JSSL Tampines	Women	Free
MF	(Singapore) Janet Tan	(Singapore) Turf City FC	Women	Free

=== Loan in ===
Preseason

Position	Player	Transferred from	Team	Ref
DF	(Singapore) Irsalina Irwan	(United States) IMG Academy	First Team	Season loan

=== Loan return ===
Preseason

Position	Player	Transferred To / From	Ref

=== Out ===
Preseason

Position	Player	Transferred To	Team	Ref
GK	(Singapore) Nur Izzati	(Singapore)	Women	Free
DF	(Singapore) Wee Xin Yi	(Singapore)	Women	Free
DF	(Singapore) Nur Emilia Natasha	(Singapore)	Women	Free
DF	(Philippines) Marilou Bautista Rubio	(Singapore)	Women	Free
MF	(Japan) Marina Asada	(Japan)	Women	Free
MF	(United States) Sierra Castles	(United States)	Women	Free
MF	(Singapore) Sarah Zu’risqha Zul’kepli	(Singapore) Lion City Sailors (W)	Women	Free
MF	(Singapore) Suriati Soony	(Singapore)	Women	Free
MF	(Singapore) Jill Quek Chwee Peng	(Singapore)	Women	Free
MF	(Singapore) Siti Erma Ellyana	(Singapore) Geylang International	Women	Free
MF	(Singapore) Noriko Farahsyazwani	(Singapore)	Women	Free
MF	(Singapore) Siti Nor Aqilah	(Singapore)	Women	Free
MF	(Wales) Lauren Reese	(Singapore) Still Aerion WFC	Women	Free
FW	(Singapore) Nurhidayah Shah	(Singapore)	Women	Free
FW	(Singapore) Tina Afrida Nasmi	(Singapore) Eastern Thunder FC	Women	Free

Mid-season

Position	Player	Transferred To	Team	Ref
GK	(Singapore) Maisarah Ramat	(Singapore)	Women	Free
DF	(Singapore) Faradila Rafidi	(Singapore)	Women	Free
DF	(Singapore) Cynthia Taye Shi Ya	(Singapore)	Women	Free
MF	(Singapore) Nahwah Aidilreza	(Singapore)	Women	Free
MF	(Singapore) Rabi'atul Ardawiyah	(Singapore)	Women	Free
FW	(Singapore) Nahwah Aidilreza	(Singapore) Geylang International	Women	Free

=== Loan out ===
Position	Player	Transferred To	Ref

=== Extended ===
Position	Player	Ref
GK	(Singapore) Maisarah Ramat	
DF	(Singapore) (China) Sun Jie	
DF	(Singapore) Dini Danisha	
DF	(Singapore) Cynthia Taye Shi Ya	
MF	(Japan) Kana Kitahara	
MF	(Singapore) Nadhra Aqilah	
MF	(Singapore) Noralinda Wahab	
MF	(Singapore) Huraizah Ismail	
FW	(Singapore) Nurul Unaisah	

== Friendly ==
=== Pre-season ===
Win Draw Loss

== Team statistics ==
=== Appearances and goals (Women) ===
As of 11 Aug 2024

No.	Pos.	Player	WPL		Total	
No.	Pos.	Player	Apps.	Goals	Apps.	Goals
2	FW	(Japan) Yuki Monden	3+1	1	0	0
3	DF	(Singapore) Nabilla Aina	0	0	0	0
4	DF	(Singapore) Faradila Rafidi	0+1	0	0	0
5	DF	(Singapore) Irsalina Irwan	2	0	0	0
6	FW	(Singapore) (France) Lila Tan	8+1	3	0	0
7	FW	(Singapore) Huraizah Ismail	10+2	1	0	0
8	MF	(Singapore) Noralinda Wahab	8+1	4	0	0
9	MF	(Singapore) Nadhra Aqilah	0	0	0	0
10	MF	(Singapore) Izzati Rosni	2+1	3	0	0
11	MF	(Singapore) Nahwah Aidilreza	0+1	1	0	0
13	DF	(Singapore) (China) Sun Jie	12	0	0	0
14	MF	(Singapore) Kana Kitahara	8+1	11	0	0
17	MF	(Singapore) Dhaniyah Qasimah	12	3	0	0
18	FW	(Japan) Manami Fukuzawa	11	16	0	0
20	GK	(Singapore) Nurul Haziqah	5	0	0	0
21	GK	(Singapore) Lutfiah Hannah	7	0	0	0
22	MF	(Singapore) Nurul Unaisah	0+1	1	0	0
23	DF	(Malaysia) Rebecca Harding	0	0	0	0
25	GK	(Singapore) Maisarah Ramat	0	0	0	0
29	MF	(Singapore) Mulan Ayliffe	4	4	0	0
30	MF	(Singapore) Nurzaherra Maisarah	10+1	3	0	0
32	MF	(Singapore) Afiqah Omar	6+1	6	0	0
45	MF	(Singapore) Rabi'atul Ardawiyah	0	0	0	0
54	DF	(Singapore) Dini Danisha	2	0	0	0
88	DF	(Singapore) Ernie Sulastri	12	0	0	0
99	DF	(Singapore) Rosnani Azman	10	1	0	0

== Competitions ==
=== Women's Premier League ===
Win Draw Loss

10 March 2024 1	Albirex Niigata (S) (Japan)	3–0	(Singapore) Geylang International	Choa Chu Kang
	Mulan Ayliffe 5', 90+3'; Manami Fukuzawa 38'	Report		Stadium: Choa Chu Kang Stadium

24 March 2024 2	Albirex Niigata (S) (Japan)	1–2	(Singapore) Lion City Sailors	Jalan Besar
	Mulan Ayliffe 87'	Report	Raeka Ee Pei Ying 29', 48'	Stadium: Jalan Besar Stadium

13 April 2024 3	Albirex Niigata (S) (Japan)	6–0	(Singapore) Tiong Bahru FC	Yishun
	Izzati Rosni 31', 48', 65'; Lila Tan 45'; Mulan Ayliffe 70'; Kana Kitahara 85'	Report		Stadium: Yishun Stadium

21 April 2024 4	Albirex Niigata (S) (Japan)	4–1	(Singapore) Hougang United	Simei
	Mulan Ayliffe 22'; Nahwah Aidilreza 56'; Afiqah Omar 84'; Manami Fukuzawa 88'	Report	Nicole Lim 43'	Stadium: ITE College East

27 April 2024 5	Albirex Niigata (S) (Japan)	1–0	(Singapore) Tanjong Pagar United	Choa Chu Kang
	Manami Fukuzawa 38'	Report		Stadium: Choa Chu Kang Stadium

11 May 2024 6	Albirex Niigata (S) (Japan)	14–0	(Singapore) Balestier Khalsa	Choa Chu Kang
	Manami Fukuzawa 10', 20', 34', 45+1', 47', 49', 77'; Noralinda Wahab 11'; Lila Tan 32', 45+3'; Kana Kitahara 44', 62', 90+7'; Yuki Moden 86'	Report		Stadium: Choa Chu Kang Stadium

19 May 2024 7	Albirex Niigata (S) (Japan)	3–1	(Singapore) Still Aerion WFC	Choa Chu Kang
	Afiqah Omar; Kana KItahara; Manami Fukuzawa	Report	U. Yongkul 45+1'	Stadium: Choa Chu Kang Stadium

23 June 2024 8	Albirex Niigata (S) (Japan)	6–0	(Singapore) JSSL Tampines	Choa Chu Kang
	Huraizah Ismail (??); Nurzaherra Maisarah (??); Noralinda Wahab (??); Manami Fukuzawa (??); Kana Kitahara (??)	Report		Stadium: Choa Chu Kang Stadium

30 June 2024 9	Albirex Niigata (S) (Japan)	3–0	(Singapore) Geylang International	Choa Chu Kang
	Manami Fukuzawa 30' (?); Mulan Ayliffe 30'			Stadium: Choa Chu Kang Stadium

21 July 2024 10	Albirex Niigata (S) (Japan)	1–3	(Singapore) Lion City Sailors	Choa Chu Kang
	Dhaniyah Qasimah 25'		Nur Ain Salleh 32', 58'; Josephine Ang Kaile 52'; 56'	Stadium: Choa Chu Kang Stadium

27 July 2024 11	Albirex Niigata (S) (Japan)	13–0	(Singapore) Tiong Bahru FC	Choa Chu Kang
	Nurzaherra Maisarah; Noralinda Wahab; Kana Kitahara; Dhaniyah Qasimah; Rosnani Azman Manami; Nurul Unaisah; Manami Fukuzawa (?) (?) (?); Afiqah Omar (?) (?) (?) (?)			Stadium: Choa Chu Kang Stadium

4 August 2024 12	Albirex Niigata (S) (Japan)	3–2	(Singapore) Hougang United	Simei
	Nurzaherra Maisarah 42'; Kana Kitahara 47'; Manami Fukuzawa 63'	Report	Raudhah Kamis 31', 65'	Stadium: ITE College East

10 August 2024 13	Albirex Niigata (S) (Japan)	4–0	(Singapore) Tanjong Pagar United	Choa Chu Kang
	Kana Kitahara; Dhaniyah Qasimah			Stadium: Choa Chu Kang Stadium

24 August 2024 14	Albirex Niigata (S) (Japan)	6–0	(Singapore) Balestier Khalsa	Choa Chu Kang
	Manami Fukuzawa 16', 55'; Yuki Moden 17'; Nurzaherra Maisarah 31'; Afiqah Omar 33'; Dhaniyah Qasimah 47'; Lila Tan 76'			Stadium: Choa Chu Kang Stadium

31 August 2024 15	Albirex Niigata (S) (Japan)	8–0	(Singapore) Still Aerion WFC	Simei
	Yuki Moden 2'; Kana Kitahara 15'; Noralinda Wahab 22', 44'; Manami Fukuzawa 60'; Lila Tan 66'; Nurul Unaisah 81', 86'			Stadium: ITE College East

8 September 2024 16	Albirex Niigata (S) (Japan)	8–0	(Singapore) JSSL Tampines	Simei
	Yuki Moden 29'; Nurzaherra Maisarah 31'; Lila Tan 47'; Manami Fukuzawa 57', 90+1'; 83' (o.g.); Dhaniyah Qasimah 86'; Nurul Unaisah 89'			Stadium: ITE College East

League table

Pos	Team	Pld	W	D	L	GF	GA	GD	Pts	Qualification or relegation
1	Lion City Sailors (C)	16	14	1	1	95	4	+91	43	Qualification for AFC Champions League
2	Albirex Niigata (S)	16	14	0	2	84	9	+75	42	
3	Geylang International	16	9	4	3	48	16	+32	31	
4	Still Aerion	16	8	4	4	38	27	+11	28	
5	Hougang United	16	8	3	5	37	22	+15	27	
6	Tanjong Pagar United	16	5	2	9	15	25	−10	17	
7	BG Tampines Rovers	16	3	2	11	22	59	−37	11	
8	Tiong Bahru	16	2	1	13	11	81	−70	7	
9	Balestier Khalsa	16	0	1	15	3	110	−107	1	

Updated to match(es) played on 15 September 2024. Source: Women's Premier League
Rules for classification: 1) points; 2) goal difference; 3) number of goals scored; 4) number of wins
(C) League champions
