= 2024 Women's Premier League (Singapore) =

23rd season of the Singapore Women's Premier League

Women's Premier League
- Season: 2024
- Dates: 9 March – 15 September
- Champions: Lion City Sailors
- AFC Champions League: Lion City Sailors
- Matches: 72
- Goals: 353 (4.9 per match)
- Top goalscorer: (Japan) Manami Fukusawa (23 goals)
- Biggest home win: LCS 18–0 Balestier (4 May 2024)
- Biggest away win: Balestier 0–14 Albirex (S) (11 May 2024)
- Highest scoring: LCS 18–0 Balestier (4 May 2024)
- Longest winning run: 7 matches LC Sailors/Albirex (S)
- Longest unbeaten run: 7 matches LC Sailors/Albirex (S)
- Longest winless run: 16 matches Balestier
- Longest losing run: 8 matches Balestier
- Total attendance: 5,105
- Average attendance: 71

The 2024 Women's Premier League (also known as the Deloitte Women's Premier League due to sponsorship reasons with Deloitte) was the 5th season of the Women's Premier League and the 23rd season of the top-flight women's football league in Singapore. The season began on 9 March 2024.

== Summary ==
Nine teams participated in the 2024 season, following the withdrawal of Police Sports Association. The league champions will receive S$25,000, while the second and third-placed teams will receive S$10,000 and S$7,500 respectively. All the WPL's matches were to be played at Choa Chu Kang Stadium. Like previous season, admission to all matches is free to the public. From 23 March, Choa Chu Kang Stadium was closed for maintenance after complaints of poor pitch conditions. Matches were temporarily played at Jalan Besar Stadium. It was announced that matches from 14 April onwards would be played at two venues, Choa Chu Kang Stadium and ITE College East, with one matchday at each venue. There were some concerns that Geylang International has a home advantage as the team trained there.

Albirex Niigata (S)’s 2023 WPL Player of the Year and Golden Boot winner Kana Kitahara assumed a dual player-coach role for their women's team. Lion City Sailors promoted goalkeeping coach Daniel Ong to take over from Yeong Sheau Shyan, who led the side to back-to-back undefeated campaigns and was WPL Coach of the Year in 2022 and 2023. Lion City Sailors won their third consecutive title after a 6-0 victory over Still Aerion.

== Teams ==
A total of 9 teams competed in the league.

Team	Team list
Albirex Niigata (S)	2024
Balestier Khalsa	
Hougang United	2024
Geylang International	2024
Lion City Sailors	2024
Still Aerion WFC	2024
BG Tampines Rovers	2024
Tanjong Pagar United	
Tiong Bahru FC	

=== Coaching changes ===
Team	Outgoing coach	Manner of departure	Date of vacancy	Position in the table	Incoming coach	Date of appointment
Albirex Niigata (S)	Nahar Daud			Pre-season	Kana Kitahara	
Lion City Sailors	Yeong Sheau Shyan	Became the head of the Sailors women’s programme		Pre-season	Daniel Ong	
BG Tampines Rovers FC	Joe O'Sullivan	Remained on as Team Manager		Pre-season	Faizal Zainuddin	

== Foreign players ==
All teams may register a maximum of four foreign players with a minimum age of sixteen at the point of registration.

Players name in bold indicates the player was registered during the mid-season transfer window.

Team	Player 1	Player 2	Player 3	Player 4	Former players
Albirex Niigata (S)	(Japan) Kana Kitahara	(Japan) Manami Fukuzawa	(Japan) Yuki Monden	(Malaysia) Rebecca Jane Harding	
Balestier Khalsa	(United States) Oihana Marine Dany	(Japan) Ishita	Equzkine Calzada		
Geylang International	(Australia) Olliana Davies	(United States) **Victoria Sarka**	(France) Maeva Lazorthes Pedauga		
Hougang United	(Canada) Sydney Hector	(Philippines) Riddle Reneelyn Sison			
Lion City Sailors	(Japan) Miray Hokotate Altun	(United States) Sara Hayduchok	(Canada) Madison Telmer	(France) **Priscille Le Helloco**	(Germany) Laura Gänser
Still Aerion WFC	(England) Carmen Calisto	(Thailand) Sunisa Srangthaisong	(Thailand) Uraiporn Yongkul	(Seychelles) **Reena Esther**	(Wales) Lauren Reese
Tampines Rovers	(England) Maia McCoy	(India) Anaya Sehgal	(China) **Vanessa Han**	(Mexico) **Andrea Moska**	(United States) Victoria Sarka (France) Priscille Le Helloco
Tiong Bahru FC	(England) Helena Constantinou	(United States) Larissa Anne Orthmann			
Tanjong Pagar United	(Japan) Ayaka Miki				

== Results ==
=== League table ===
Pos	Team	Pld	W	D	L	GF	GA	GD	Pts	Qualification or relegation
1	Lion City Sailors (C)	16	14	1	1	95	4	+91	43	Qualification for AFC Champions League
2	Albirex Niigata (S)	16	14	0	2	84	9	+75	42	
3	Geylang International	16	9	4	3	48	16	+32	31	
4	Still Aerion	16	8	4	4	38	27	+11	28	
5	Hougang United	16	8	3	5	37	22	+15	27	
6	Tanjong Pagar United	16	5	2	9	15	25	−10	17	
7	BG Tampines Rovers	16	3	2	11	22	59	−37	11	
8	Tiong Bahru	16	2	1	13	11	81	−70	7	
9	Balestier Khalsa	16	0	1	15	3	110	−107	1	

Updated to match(es) played on 15 September 2024. Source: Women's Premier League
Rules for classification: 1) points; 2) goal difference; 3) number of goals scored; 4) number of wins
(C) League champions

=== Fixtures and results ===
The league operates on a home and away round-robin format from 9 March 2024.

Home \ Away	ALB	BAL	GEY	HOU	LCS	STI	TAM	TIB	TPU
Albirex Niigata (S)		6–0	3–0	4–1	1–3	3–1	8–0	6–0	4–0
Balestier Khalsa	0–14		0–5	0–6	0–11	0–8	0–2	1–1	0–2
Geylang International	0–3	13–0		0–2	2–1	1–1	5–1	7–0	3–0
Hougang United	2–3	3–0	3–3		0–4	1–1	4–1	5–0	0–0
Lion City Sailors	2–1	18–0	0–0	3–0		6–0	9–0	5–0	3–0
Still Aerion	0–8	5–0	1–1	2–0	0–4		2–2	6–0	2–0
BG Tampines Rovers	0–6	7–0	1–2	1–3	0–10	0–1		3–0	1–1
Tiong Bahru	0–13	5–0	0–4	0–4	0–13	1–7	4–3		0–2
Tanjong Pagar United	0–1	4–2	0–2	0–3	0–3	0–1	4–0	2–0	

Updated to match(es) played on 15 September 2024. Source: Football Association of Singapore
Legend: Blue = home team win; Yellow = draw; Red = away team win.

== Statistics ==
=== Top scorers ===
As of 15 September 2024

Rank	Player	Club	Goals
1	(Japan) Manami Fukuzawa	Albirex Niigata (S)	23
2	(Singapore) Raeka Ee	Lion City Sailors	18
3	(Singapore) Farah Nurzahirah	Geylang International	15
4	(Singapore) Josephine Ang	Lion City Sailors	12
4	(Japan) Kana Kitahara	Albirex Niigata (S)	12
5	(Canada) Sydney Hector	Hougang	11
6	(Thailand) Uraiporn Yongkul	Still Aerion	10
7	(United States) Victoria Sarka	Geylang / Tampines	9

Source: Women's Premier League

== Awards ==
The Football Association of Singapore (FAS) hosted the inaugural Amateur Leagues Awards Night Season 2024 on Friday, 21 February, at 6pm at the SportSG Auditorium (BlackBox). The event celebrated outstanding individuals from the Singapore Football League (SFL 1 and 2), Women’s Premier League (WPL), and Women’s National League (WNL).

Award	Nominee	Club	Recipient
Deloitte Player of the Year	Farhanah Ruhaizat	Geylang International	Manami Fukuzawa
Deloitte Player of the Year	Manami Fukuzawa	Albirex Niigata (S)	Manami Fukuzawa
Deloitte Player of the Year	Syazwani Ruzi	Lion City Sailors	Manami Fukuzawa
Young Player of the Year	Bernice Lim	Still Aerion	Farah Nurzahirah
Young Player of the Year	Farah Nurzahirah	Geylang International	Farah Nurzahirah
Young Player of the Year	Sarah Zu’risqha	Lion City Sailors	Farah Nurzahirah
Coach of the Year	Daniel Ong	Lion City Sailors	Ratna Suffian
Coach of the Year	Ratna Suffian	Geylang International	Ratna Suffian
Coach of the Year	Samawira Basri	Tanjong Pagar United	Ratna Suffian
Goal of the Year	Manami Fukuzawa (vs Hougang United, 4 August 2024)	Albirex Niigata (S)	Uraiporn Yongkul
Goal of the Year	Summer Chong (vs Balestier Khalsa, 11 August 2024)	Geylang International	Uraiporn Yongkul
Goal of the Year	Uraiporn Yongkul (vs Balestier Khalsa, 14 April 2024)	Still Aerion	Uraiporn Yongkul
Golden Boot	Manami Fukuzawa (Albirex Niigata (S))		
Golden Glove	Izairida Shakira (Lion City Sailors)		
Fair Play Award	Hougang United FC		

Source: fas.org.sg
