= 2024 Aerion Women's FC season =

Aerion WFC
2024 season
- Chairman: Simon Tan
- Head Coach: Jeremy Chiang (Still Aerion)
- Premier League: 4th (Still Aerion)
- National League: Third-placing (Royal Arion)
- Top goalscorer: WPL: Mira (6); WNL: Serena Bok (5)

The 2024 season will mark Still Aerion WFC's 15th season playing in the top flight of Singapore's women football, Women's Premier League.

Royal Arion WFC will be playing in the Women's National League.

On 8 March 2024, Still Aerion WFC announced on their social media that former professional and international player Jeremy Chiang is the current head coach for the women's team.

== Squad ==
=== Still Aerion WFC ===
Squad No.	Name	Nationality	Date of birth (age)	Previous club	Contract since	Contract end
Goalkeeper
1	Pamela Kong	(Singapore)	5 August 1991 (age 34)	(Singapore)	2022	2024
25	Dharshini Sarah	(Singapore)		(Singapore)	2024	2024
4	Jasmine Kua	(Singapore)		(Singapore) Hougang United	2023	2024
Defender
5	Sharon Tan	(Singapore)		(Singapore)	2023	2024
6	Fonda Chai (C)	(Singapore)		(Singapore)	2017	2024
11	Mira Ruzana Seherzan	(Singapore)	6 January 2001 (age 25)	(Singapore)	2023	2024
12	Bernice Lim	(Singapore)		(Singapore)	2024	2024
14	Nur Humaira Ibrahim	(Singapore)		(Singapore) Royal Arion WFC	2022	2024
15	Carissa Tan	(Singapore)		(Singapore)	2024	2024
21	Tharshini Rajasegar	(Singapore)		(Singapore) Royal Arion WFC	2024	2024
Midfielder
2	Rachel Liew	(Singapore)		(Singapore)	2023	2024
8	Nursafura Ali	(Singapore)		(Singapore)	2023	2024
10	Sunisa Srangthaisong	(Thailand)	6 May 1988 (age 37)	(Singapore) Royal Arion WFC	2024	2024
18	Joyce Foo	(Singapore)		(Singapore)	2024	2024
20	Bhanu Krishnasamy	(Singapore)	28 August 1995 (age 30)	(Singapore) Royal Arion WFC	2024	2024
Forwards
7	Carmen Calisto	(England)		(Singapore)	2023	2024
9	Monessha Nair	(Singapore)		(Singapore) Tiong Bahru FC	2023	2024
13	Uraiporn Yongkul	(Thailand)	17 August 1998 (age 27)	(Thailand) BG Bundit Asia	2024	2024
17	Reena Esther	(Seychelles)	20 June 2005 (age 20)	(Seychelles) Marina Maintenance FC	2024	2024
19	Janine Lim	(Singapore)		(Singapore)	2023	2024
16	Hannah Tasha	(Singapore)		(Singapore)	2023	2024
22	Saranya Thiru	(Singapore)		(Singapore) Tiong Bahru FC	2023	2024
23	Anupriya Subramanian	(Singapore)		(Singapore) Tiong Bahru FC	2024	2024
24	Nurhannah Qistina	(Singapore)		(Singapore)	2022	2024
Players who left during the season
3	Lauren Louise Reese	(Wales)	3 May 1997 (age 28)	(Singapore) Albirex Niigata (S)	2023	2024

=== Royal Arion WFC ===
Note: Royal Arion released their roster for 2024 season on their social media.

Squad No.	Name	Nationality	Date of birth (age)	Previous club	Contract since	Contract end
Goalkeeper
1	Yeoh Yi Ping	(Singapore)		(Singapore)		
96	Hazel Lim Ya Ting	(Singapore) / (Australia)	3 March 2002 (age 24)	(Australia) Southern United	2024	2024
Defender
17	Mavis Lim	(Singapore)		(Singapore)	2023	2024
18	Chloe Lim	(Singapore)		(Singapore)	2023	2024
26	Nicole Niam	(Singapore)		(Singapore)	2023	2024
Midfielder
11	Joyce Foo	(Singapore)		(Singapore)	2023	2024
20	Esther Thang	(Singapore)		(Singapore)	2023	2024
23	Lauretta Cheng	(Singapore)		(Singapore)	2023	2024
Forward
8	Sherlyn Ng	(Singapore)		(Singapore)	2023	2024
10	Tharshini Rajesegar	(Singapore)		(Singapore)	2023	2024
21	Serena Bok	(Singapore)		(Singapore)	2023	2024
Outfield Players
2	Harini	(Singapore)		(Singapore)		
5	Yu Ting	(Singapore)		(Singapore)		
6	Erica	(Singapore)		(Singapore)		
7	Wei Xuan	(Singapore)		(Singapore)		
9	Remi Ogawa	(Japan)		(Singapore)		
13	Clara	(Singapore)		(Singapore)		
14	Annalisa	(Singapore)		(Singapore)		
15	Alyssha	(Singapore)		(Singapore) Ayer Rajah Gryphons	2024	2024
16	Hannah	(Singapore)		(Singapore)		
22	Ayla Chin	(Singapore)		(Singapore)		
24	Nurhannah	(Singapore)		(Singapore)		
25	Tricia	(Singapore)		(Singapore)		
27	Diyaanah	(Singapore)		(Singapore)		
32	Claudia	(Singapore)		(Singapore)		

== Coaching staff ==
The following list displays the coaching staff of all the Aerion Women's FC current football sections:

Position	Name
President	Simon Tan
General Manager	
Team Manager (Still Aerion)	
Team Manager (Royal Arion)	
Head Coach (Still Aerion)	(Singapore) Jeremy Chiang
Head Coach (Royal Arion)	

== Transfers ==
=== In ===
Pre-season

Position	Player	Transferred From
MF	(Thailand) Sunisa Srangthaisong	(Singapore) Royal Arion
DF	(Singapore) Nur Humaira Ibrahim	(Singapore) Royal Arion
MF	(Singapore) Bhanu Krishnasamy	(Singapore) Royal Arion
FW	(Singapore) Saranya Thiru	(Singapore) Royal Arion
DF	(Singapore) Tharshini Rajasegar	(Singapore) Royal Arion
FW	(Thailand) Uraiporn Yongkul	(Thailand) BG Bundit Asia
FW	(Singapore) Anupriya Subramanian	(Singapore) Tiong Bahru FC
GK	(Singapore) Dharshini Sarah	
DF	(Singapore) Bernice Lim	
DF	(Singapore) Carissa Tan	
MF	(Singapore) Joyce Foo	

Mid-season

Position	Player	Transferred From
FW	(Seychelles) Reena Esther	(Seychelles) Marine Maintenance FC

=== Out ===
Pre-season

Position	Player	Transferred To
GK	(Singapore) Nurul Faizah Binte Ramle	(Singapore) Hougang United
FW	(Singapore) Claire Marie Tay	(Singapore) Hougang United
FW	(United States) Larissa Anne Orthmann	(Singapore) Tiong Bahru FC
DF	(Singapore) Abigail Goh	(Singapore) Tanjong Pagar United
MF	(Germany) Annabel Mathilde Marx	(Singapore) Eastern Thunder FC
DF	(Singapore) Nur Farah Amirah Fauder	-
DF	(Singapore) Deanna Lim	-
DF	(Singapore) Yeong Siew Mei	-
MF	(Singapore) Ariesa Zahran Binte Junaidi	-
MF	(Singapore) Ayushi Anand	-
MF	(Singapore) Foo Shini	-

Mid-season

Position	Player	Transferred To
MF	(Wales) Lauren Louise Reese	-

== Friendlies ==
=== Pre-season friendlies ===
Win Draw Loss

CF Charity Cup 2024

12 Jan 2024 1	Lion City Sailors	4-2	Royal Arion	Tampines
	Qarissa Putri 37'; Nur Sarah Zu’risqha 42'; Nur Izzati Rosni (pen.); Sara Hayduchok 86'	Report	Pikul Khueanpet 75'; Orapin Waenngoen	Stadium: Our Tampines Hub

== Team statistics ==
=== Appearances and goals ===
==== Still Aerion ====
Warning: The appearance of the squad members may not be accurate as neither the club or FAS produce the full playing list on their website.

As of 22 Jun 2024

No.	Pos.	Player	WPL		Total	
No.	Pos.	Player	Apps.	Goals	Apps.	Goals
1	GK	(Singapore) Pamela Kong	8	0	8	0
2	DF	(Singapore) Rachel Liew	3	0	3	0
4	DF	(Singapore) Jasmine Kua	1	0	1	0
5	FW	(Singapore) Sharon Tan	3	0	3	0
6	DF	(Singapore) Fonda Chai	7	0	7	0
7	MF	(England) Carmen Calisto	5	3	5	3
8	DF	(Singapore) Nursafura	4	0	4	0
9	FW	(Singapore) Monessha Nair	4	0	4	0
10	DF	(Thailand) Sunisa Srangthaisong	8	2	8	2
11	DF	(Singapore) Mira Ruzana Sheeran	7	0	7	0
12	DF	(Singapore) Bernice Lim	5	0	5	0
13	MF	(Thailand) Uraiporn Yongkul	8	8	8	8
14	MF	(Singapore) Nur Humaira Ibrahim	7	0	7	0
15	MF	(Singapore) Carissa Tan	0+1	1	1	1
16	MF	(Singapore) Hannah Tasha	0	0	0	0
17	FW	(Seychelles) Reena Esther	2	3	2	3
18	MF	(Singapore) Joyce Foo	0	0	0	0
19	DF	(Singapore) Janine Lim	3	0	3	0
20	MF	(Singapore) Bhanu	7	1	7	1
21	FW	(Singapore) Tharshini	0	0	0	0
22	MF	(Singapore) Saranya Thiru	5+1	3	6	3
23	MF	(Singapore) Anupriya Subramanian	0	0	0	0
24	MF	(Singapore) Nurhannah Qistina	0	0	0	0
25	GK	(Singapore) Dharshini Sarah	0	0	0	0
Players who have played this season but had left the club or on loan to other club
3	MF	(Wales) Lauren Reese	1+1	1	2	1

== Competition ==
=== Women's Premier League ===
Fixtures and results

Win Draw Loss Postponed

10 Mar 2024 1	Tanjong Pagar United	0-1	Still Aerion	Choa Chu Kang
17:00 (GMT+8)			S. Sunisa 60'	Stadium: Choa Chu Kang Stadium; Player of the Match: U. Yongkul

14 Apr 2024 2	Balestier Khalsa	0-8	Still Aerion	Simei
17:00 (GMT+8)		Report	Carmen Calisto 14', 74'; U. Yongkul 22', 55', 63'; Lauren Reese 59'; Saranya Thiru 69', 71'	Stadium: ITE College East; Player of the Match: U. Yongkul

21 Apr 2024 3	Tiong Bahru	P-P	Still Aerion	Simei
17:00 (GMT+8)				Stadium: ITE College East
Note: Postponed due to inclement weather. Rescheduled to 19 June.

28 Apr 2024 4	Still Aerion	P-P	BG Tampines Rovers	Simei
17:00 (GMT+8)				Stadium: ITE College East
Note: Postponed due to inclement weather. Rescheduled to 25 May.

5 May 2024 5	Geylang International	1-1	Still Aerion	Simei
19:30 (GMT+8)	Farah Nurzahirah 35'	Report	U. Yongkul 45+1'	Stadium: ITE College East
Note: Rescheduled from 4th to 5th May 2024

11 May 2024 6	Still Aerion	0-4	Lion City Sailors	Choa Chu Kang
19:30 (GMT+8)		Report	Raeka Ee 13'; Nur Syazwani Ruzi 37'; Umairah Hamdan 48', 61'	Stadium: Choa Chu Kang Stadium

18 May 2024 7	Albirex Niigata (S)	3-1	Still Aerion	Choa Chu Kang
19:30 (GMT+8)	Afiqah Omar; Kana KItahara; Manami Fukuzawa	Report	U. Yongkul 45+1'	Stadium: Choa Chu Kang Stadium

25 May 2024 4*	Still Aerion	2-2	BG Tampines Rovers	Choa Chu Kang
19:30 (GMT+8)	Saranya 27'; S. Sunisa 32' (pen.)			Stadium: Choa Chu Kang Stadium
Note: Rescheduled from 28th April

19 June 2024 3*	Tiong Bahru	1-7	Still Aerion	Choa Chu Kang
17:30 (GMT+8)			U. Yongkul 12', 40', 63'; Reena Esther 13', 65'; Bhanu 29'; Carissa Tan 47'	Stadium: Choa Chu Kang Stadium; Player of the Match: Reena Esther
Note: Rescheduled from 21 April.

22 Jun 2024 8	Still Aerion	2-0	Hougang United	Choa Chu Kang
17:00 (GMT+8)	Carmen Calisto 68'; Reena Esther 81'	Report		Stadium: Choa Chu Kang Stadium; Player of the Match: Carmen Calisto

30 Jun 2024 9	Still Aerion	2-0	Tanjong Pagar United	Choa Chu Kang
17:00 (GMT+8)	S. Sunisa 8'; Saranya 29'			Stadium: Choa Chu Kang Stadium

28 Jul 2024 10	Still Aerion	5-0	Balestier Khalsa	Choa Chu Kang
17:00 (GMT+8)	8' (o.g.); U. Yongkul 17'; Bernice Lim 39'; S. Sunisa 55', 58'			Stadium: Choa Chu Kang Stadium; Player of the Match: S. Sunisa

4 Aug 2024 11	Still Aerion	6-0	Tiong Bahru	Choa Chu Kang
17:00 (GMT+8)	Bernice Lim 9', 51'; Reena Esther 2', 22'; U. Yongkul 55'; Saranya Thiru 74'			Stadium: Choa Chu Kang Stadium

11 Aug 2024 12	BG Tampines Rovers	0-1	Still Aerion	Choa Chu Kang
17:00 (GMT+8)			Saranya Thiru 47'	Stadium: Choa Chu Kang Stadium; Player of the Match: Saranya

17 Aug 2024 13	Still Aerion	1-1	Geylang International	Choa Chu Kang
19:30 (GMT+8)	Monessha 47'		Kyra Taylor 87'	Stadium: Choa Chu Kang Stadium

31 Aug 2024 15	Still Aerion	0-8	Albirex Niigata (S)	Choa Chu Kang
19:30 (GMT+8)			Yuki Moden 2'; Kana Kitahara 15'; Noralinda Wahab 22', 44'; Manami Fukuzawa 60'; Lila Tan 66'; Nurul Unaisah 81', 86'	Stadium: Choa Chu Kang Stadium

4 Sep 2024 14	Lion City Sailors	P-P	Still Aerion	Choa Chu Kang
				Stadium: Choa Chu Kang Stadium

7 Sep 2024 16	Hougang United	1-1	Still Aerion	Choa Chu Kang
			Monessha 34'	Stadium: Choa Chu Kang Stadium; Player of the Match: Monessha

15 Sep 2024 14*	Lion City Sailors	6-0	Still Aerion	Choa Chu Kang
	Raeka Ee Pei Ying 5', 31'; Sarah Zu’risqha 60', 82'; Nurhidayu Naszri 75'; Nur Ain Salleh 90'			Stadium: Choa Chu Kang Stadium
Note: Rescheduled from 4th to 15th Sep 2024

League table

Pos	Team	Pld	W	D	L	GF	GA	GD	Pts	Qualification or relegation
1	Lion City Sailors (C)	16	14	1	1	95	4	+91	43	Qualification for AFC Champions League
2	Albirex Niigata (S)	16	14	0	2	84	9	+75	42	
3	Geylang International	16	9	4	3	48	16	+32	31	
4	Still Aerion	16	8	4	4	38	27	+11	28	
5	Hougang United	16	8	3	5	37	22	+15	27	
6	Tanjong Pagar United	16	5	2	9	15	25	−10	17	
7	BG Tampines Rovers	16	3	2	11	22	59	−37	11	
8	Tiong Bahru	16	2	1	13	11	81	−70	7	
9	Balestier Khalsa	16	0	1	15	3	110	−107	1	

Updated to match(es) played on 15 September 2024. Source: Women's Premier League
Rules for classification: 1) points; 2) goal difference; 3) number of goals scored; 4) number of wins
(C) League champions

=== Women's National League ===
(Played under name of Royal Arion WFC)

Fixtures and results

Win Draw Loss Postponed

29 Sep 2024 6	Royal Arion	1-0	Eastern Thunder	Choa Chu Kang
19:30 UTC+8	Nurhannah 90+2'			Stadium: Choa Chu Kang; Player of the Match: Nurhannah

5 Oct 2024 7	Mattar Sailors	1-2	Royal Arion	Choa Chu Kang
17:00 UTC+8	Rayna		Wei Xuan 50'; Serena 52'	Stadium: Choa Chu Kang; Player of the Match: Wei Xuan

12 Oct 2024 10	Royal Arion	2-1	Kaki Bukit	Choa Chu Kang
17:00 UTC+8				Stadium: Choa Chu Kang

20 Oct 2024 15	Winchester Isla	1-1	Royal Arion	Choa Chu Kang
19:30 UTC+8	Imarsha 28'	Report	Serena 73'	Stadium: Choa Chu Kang

26 Oct 2024 17	Royal Arion	2-0	Ayer Rajah	Choa Chu Kang
19:30 UTC+8	Serena 52'; Lauretta 90+3'			Stadium: Choa Chu Kang; Player of the Match: Serene

3 Nov 2024 21	Singapore Khalsa	0-4	Royal Arion	Choa Chu Kang
17:00 UTC+8			Clara 4'; Serena 9', 16'; 44' (o.g.)	Stadium: Choa Chu Kang; Player of the Match: Serena

League table

Pos	Team	Pld	W	D	L	GF	GA	GD	Pts
1	Royal Arion (Q)	6	5	1	0	12	3	+9	16
2	Mattar Sailors (Q)	6	4	1	1	34	6	+28	13
3	Winchester Isla (Q)	6	3	2	1	14	14	0	11
4	Eastern Thunder (Q)	6	3	1	2	22	7	+15	10
5	Singapore Khalsa Association	6	1	2	3	5	14	−9	5
6	Kaki Bukit SC	6	1	1	4	6	26	−20	4
7	Ayer Rajah Gryphons	6	0	0	6	2	25	−23	0

Updated to match(es) played on 20 Oct 2024. Source: FAS
Rules for classification: 1) points; 2) goal difference; 3) number of goals scored; 4) number of wins
(Q) Qualified for Semi-finals

Semi Final 1

9 Nov 2024 22	Eastern Thunder	1-0	Royal Arion	Choa Chu Kang
17:00 UTC+8	Jean Loh 8'			Stadium: Choa Chu Kang Stadium

16 Nov 2024 24	Royal Arion	0-0	Eastern Thunder	Choa Chu Kang
17:00 UTC+8				Stadium: Choa Chu Kang Stadium

Eastern Thunder won 1–0 on aggregate.

Third Placing

8 Dec 2024 26	Royal Arion	4-1	Winchester Isla	Choa Chu Kang
19:30 UTC+8	Serena 11', 27'; Sherlyn 50'; 45' (o.g.)	Report		Stadium: Choa Chu Kang Stadium; Player of the Match: Serena (RAW)
Note: Rescheduled from 23 Nov due to lightning alert.

== See also ==
- 2019 Aerion Women's FC season
- 2020 Aerion Women's FC season
- 2023 Aerion Women's FC season
