= 2024–25 BG Tampines Rovers FC season =

BG Tampines Rovers
2024–25 season
- Chairman: Desmond Ong
- Coach: Gavin Lee
- Ground: Our Tampines Hub
- Singapore Premier League: TBD
- AFC Cup: Group Stage
- Singapore Cup: TBD
- Top goalscorer: League: TBD; All: TBD
- Highest home attendance: TBD
- Lowest home attendance: TBD
- Average home league attendance: TBD
Home colours	Away colours

The 2024–25 season was Tampines Rovers' 29th consecutive season at the top level of Singapore football and their 79th year in existence as a football club. It will be the club first season to be renamed by adding the word 'BG' in front of the club name. The club also qualified for the AFC Champions League Two as the 2nd best placed local team in the previous season. This will be their first season after they inked a three-year collaboration in 2023 with Thailand's BG Pathum United, a partnership that will continue until the end of the 2025–26 season.

== Review ==
=== Pre-season ===
The 2024–25 Singapore Premier League season will be the first season to be played having a two-year schedule where BG Tampines Rovers participated in the 2024 interim pre-season tournament from 23 February until 21 April. The interim pre-season tournament ensure that the players are adequately prepared for an extended new season that will span nearly 12 months.

On 23 January 2024, BG Tampines Rovers loaned in two new Thailand national, 19-year-old forward Thitipat Ekarunpong and 18-year-old defender Thanet Suknate from BG Pathum United. The club signs their former player Amirul Adli, Irish-Singaporean player, Jared Gallagher from Young Lions and Japanese player, Seia Kunori from Albirex Niigata (S).

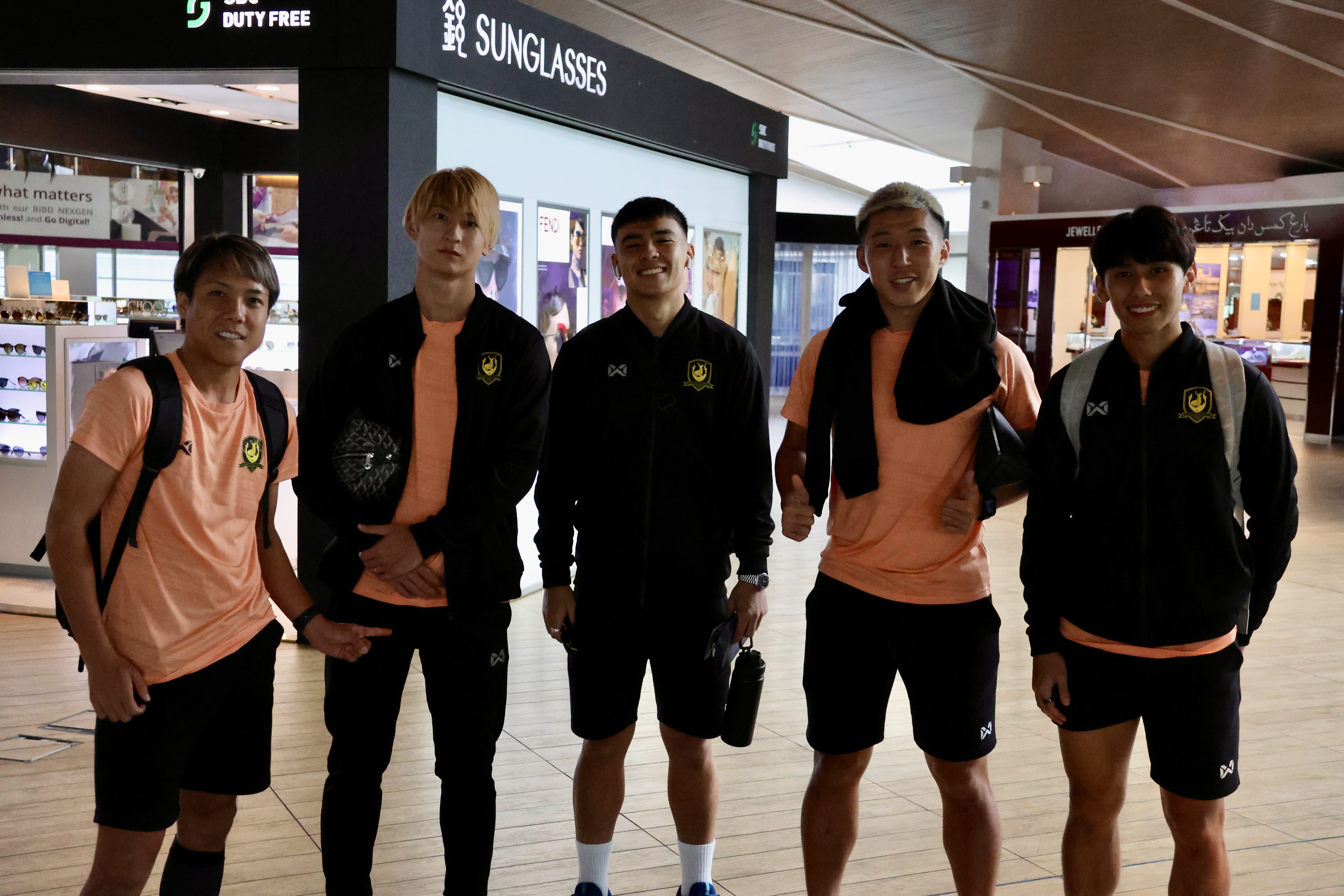
Players of Tampines Rovers after the match against DPMM

=== Round 1 ===
Tampines Rovers enjoyed a strong start to the new Singapore Premier League (SPL) season. The team consistently showcased impressive performance, resulting in a series of victories and a top position on the league table. They won 7 of the 8 games with the only blemish against their derby rival, Geylang International.

Highlight of Round 1 is the demolition of Lion City Sailors 5–0. Tampines Rovers also qualified to the 2024–25 AFC Champions League Two.

== Squad ==
=== Singapore Premier League ===
As of April 30, 2024

No.	Name	Nationality	Date of birth (age)	Last club	Contract Since	Contract end
Goalkeepers
24	Syazwan Buhari (C)	(Singapore)	22 September 1992 (age 33)	(Singapore) Geylang International	2018	2025
31	Ridhuan Barudin	(Singapore)	23 March 1987 (age 39)	(Singapore) Hougang United	2023	2025
Defenders
4	Shuya Yamashita	(Japan)	16 April 1999 (age 27)	(Japan) Albirex Niigata (S)	2022	2025
5	Amirul Adli	(Singapore)	13 January 1996 (age 30)	(Singapore) Geylang International	2024	2025
16	Dylan Fox	(Australia) (Northern Ireland)	15 April 1994 (age 32)	(Finland) FC Lahti (F1)	2025	2025
17	Amirul Haikal	(Singapore)	11 October 1999 (age 26)	(Singapore) Young Lions	2021	2025
23	Irfan Najeeb	(Singapore)	31 July 1999 (age 26)	(Singapore) Young Lions	2021	2025
33	Miloš Zlatković	(Serbia)	1 January 1997 (age 29)	(Malta) Balzan (M1)	2023	2025
Midfielders
6	Ong Yu En	(Singapore)	3 October 2003 (age 22)	(Singapore) SAFSA	2022	2025
8	Shah Shahiran	(Singapore)	14 November 1999 (age 26)	(Singapore) Young Lions	2023	2027
10	Kyoga Nakamura (VC)	(Singapore) (Japan)	25 April 1996 (age 30)	(Japan) Albirex Niigata (S)	2020	2026
12	Joel Chew	(Singapore)	9 February 2000 (age 26)	(Singapore) Young Lions	2022	2027
14	Arya Igami Tarhani ^{FP U21}	(Japan) (Iran)	24 February 2003 (age 23)	(Japan) Albirex Niigata (S)	2025	2025
18	Yasir Hanapi	(Singapore)	21 June 1989 (age 34)	(Malaysia) PDRM FA (M1)	2018	2025
Forwards
7	Seia Kunori	(Japan)	31 March 2001 (age 25)	(Japan) Albirex Niigata (S)	2024	2025
9	Itsuki Enomoto	(Japan)	4 June 2000 (age 26)	(Singapore) Young Lions	2025	2025
11	Glenn Kweh	(Singapore)	26 March 2000 (age 26)	(Singapore) Young Lions	2023	2025
13	Taufik Suparno	(Singapore) (Indonesia)	31 October 1995 (age 30)	(Singapore) Young Lions	2018	2025
30	Faris Ramli (VC)	(Singapore)	24 August 1992 (age 33)	(Singapore) Lion City Sailors	2023	2025
Players loaned out / left during season
6	Jared Gallagher	(Singapore) (Republic of Ireland)	18 January 2002 (age 24)	(Singapore) Young Lions	2024	2025
9	Boris Kopitović	(Montenegro)	27 April 1995 (age 31)	(Montenegro) OFK Petrovac (M1)	2020	2025
20	Saifullah Akbar	(Singapore)	31 January 1999 (age 27)	(Singapore) Lion City Sailors	2023	2025
22	Syahrul Sazali	(Singapore)	3 June 1998 (age 28)	(Singapore) Young Lions	2022	2025
52	Thitipat Ekarunpong ^{FP U21}	(Thailand)	5 January 2005 (age 21)	(Thailand) BG Pathum United (T1)	2024	2025
62	Thanet Suknate ^{FP U21}	(Thailand)	26 July 2005 (age 20)	(Thailand) BG Pathum United U18 (T1)	2024	2025
	Syed Firdaus Hassan	(Singapore)	30 May 1998 (age 28)	(Japan) Albirex Niigata (S)	2022	2025
	Rezza Rezky	(Singapore)	8 November 2000 (age 25)	(Singapore) Tanjong Pagar United	2022	2025
Players on National Service
	Danial Iliya	(Singapore)	6 February 2003 (age 23)	(Singapore) Young Lions	2020	2025
	Iman Hakim	(Singapore)	9 March 2002 (age 24)	(Japan) Albirex Niigata (S)	2021	2025
19	Andrew Aw	(Singapore)	29 March 2003 (age 23)	(Singapore) Young Lions	2020	2025
73	Ryaan Sanizal	(Singapore)	31 May 2002 (age 24)	(Singapore) FFA U16	2019	2023

Remarks:
^{FP U21} These players are registered as U21 foreign players.

=== Women ===
As of 24 June 2024

No.	Name	Nationality	Date of birth (age)	Last club	Contract Since	Contract end
Goalkeepers
1	Nurul Atiqah Salihin	(Singapore)	26 September 2006 (age 19)	JSSL Singapore	2022	2025
23	Izzati Safwanah	(Singapore)	30	Singapore Khalsa	2025	2025
93	Lucie Lefebvre	(France)	16	JSSL Singapore	2025	2025
25	Nurmanissa Soria	(Singapore)	41	(Singapore) Police SA	2024	2025
Defenders
6	Nur Iffah Amrin (Vice-Captain)	(Singapore)	22	(Singapore) Home United FC	2023	2025
11	Darvina Halini (Captain)	(Singapore)	38	(Singapore) Police SA	2024	2025
13	Shaniz Qistina	(Singapore)	6 June 2003 (age 23)	(Singapore) Tiong Bahru FC	2025	2025
14	Sharifah Amira	(Singapore)	30	(Singapore) Police SA	2024	2025
16	Nurul Aqilah	(Singapore)	24 January 2008 (age 18)	(Singapore) JSSL Youth	2023	2025
Midfielders
4	Vivian Eng Yan Ran	(Singapore)	36	(Singapore) Balestier Khalsa FC	2024	2025
5	Erlysha Qistina	(Singapore)	26 June 2006 (age 19)	(Singapore) Tiong Bahru FC	2025	2025
17	Siti Nor Aqilah	(Singapore)	7 October 2001 (age 24)	(Singapore) Geylang International FC	2024	2025
19	Anna Seng	(Singapore)	17	JSSL Singapore	2023	2025
28	Mio Irisawa	(Japan)	15	JSSL Singapore		
77	Shazana Ashriq	(Singapore)	8 April 2004 (age 22)	(Singapore) Balestier Khalsa FC	2024	2025
Forwards
7	Isabella Rose Edwards	(Australia)	15	(Singapore) Balestier Khalsa U13	2025	2025
9	Syakirah Jumain	(Singapore)	24	(Singapore) Tiong Bahru FC	2025	2025
10	Nahwah Aidilreza	(Singapore)	4 May 2007 (age 19)	(Singapore) Geylang International FC	2025	2025
20	Ruby Alexandra Brooks	(Australia) (Philippines)	16	JSSL Singapore	2025	2025
25	Lyra Ayaana Rippon	(Singapore)	15	JSSL Singapore	2025	2025
29	Zoey Chua	(Singapore)	18	(Singapore) Temasek Polytechnic	2024	2024
Players who left mid-season

== Coaching staff ==
Position	Name	Ref.
Chairman	(Singapore) Desmond Ong	
General Manager	(Singapore) William Phang	
Men's Team
Head Coach	(Singapore) Gavin Lee	Sign extension till 2024
Assistant Coach	(Singapore) Fahrudin Mustafić	
Goalkeeping Coach	(Singapore) William Phang	
Fitness Coach	(Singapore) Tan Guo Xiong	
Video Analyst	(Singapore) Nurhalis Azmi	
Sports Trainer	(Singapore) Chong Wei Zhi	
Head of Youth; COE U21 Coach	(Singapore) Noh Rahman	
COE U17 Coach	(Singapore) Masrezwan Masturi	
COE U15 Coach	(Singapore) Azfar Zainal Abidin	
COE U13 Coach	(Singapore) Jahsh Ruzzman (Singapore) Rudy Md Ali	
COE Goalkeeping Coach	(Singapore) Ridhuan Bahrudin	
Physiotherapist	(Singapore) Nurul Ain Hassan (Singapore) Rahulpaskaran Shoban (Singapore) Isaac Tan (Singapore) Daniel Tan (Singapore) Calvin Chua (Singapore) Sarita Mok	
Logistics Officer	(Singapore) Goh Koon Hiang	
Women's Team
Team Manager	Vaccant	
Head Coach	(Singapore) Faizal Zainuddin	
Assistant Coach	(Singapore) Jahsh Ruzzman (Singapore) Hafeez Shahni	
Goalkeeper Coach	(Singapore) Rudy Md Ali	
Physiotherapist	(Singapore) Junn Faye (Singapore) Sarita Mok (Singapore) Xin Ning	

== Transfers ==
=== In ===
Preseason

Position	Player	Transferred From	Team	Ref
GK	(Singapore) Nurmanissa Soria	(Singapore) Police SA	Women	Free
GK	(Singapore) Noor Aydrin Ikhsan	Singapore Sports School	U17	Free
GK	(Singapore) Nor Akmal Syahmi	Singapore Sports School	U17	Free
DF	(Singapore) Amirul Adli	(Singapore) Geylang International	First team	Free
DF	(Singapore) (Republic of Ireland) Jared Gallagher	(Singapore) Young Lions	First Team	Free
DF	(Singapore) Adrian Jaccard	(Singapore) Lion City Sailors U17	U21	Free
DF	(Singapore) Marcus Heng	(Singapore) Lion City Sailors U17	U21	Free
DF	(Singapore) Nadira Nur Dhamirah	(Singapore)	Women	Free
DF	(Singapore) Darvina Halini	(Singapore) Police SA	Women	Free
DF	(Singapore) Shahifah Amira	(Singapore) Police SA	Women	Free
DF	(Singapore) Neo Yan Ping	(Singapore) Geylang International FC	Women	Free
MF	(Singapore) Kieran Tan	(Singapore) Lion City Sailors U17	U21	Free
MF	(Singapore) Vivian Eng	(Singapore) Balestier Khalsa FC	Women	Free
MF	(Singapore) Shazana Ashriq	(Singapore) Balestier Khalsa FC	Women	Free
MF	(Singapore) Roszieva Roslan	(Singapore) Police SA	Women	Free
MF	(India) Anaya Sehgal	JSSL Singapore	Women	Free
MF	(Singapore) Siti Nor Aqilah	(Singapore) Geylang International FC	Women	Free
MF	(Singapore) Afiqah Asari	(Singapore) Geylang International FC	Women	Free
MF	(Singapore) Zoey Chua	(Singapore) Temasek Polytehnic	Women	Free
FW	(Japan) Seia Kunori	(Japan) Albirex Niigata (S)	First Team	Free
FW	(Singapore) Ryan Peh Jun Wen	(Singapore) Balestier Khalsa U21	U21	Free
FW	(Singapore) Adryan Shah	(Singapore) Geylang International U15	U17	Free
FW	(Singapore) Azeem Hassan	Singapore Sports School	U17	Free
FW	(Singapore) Phaem Ko	(Singapore)	Women	Free
FW	(United States) Victoria Sarka	(Singapore) Police SA	Women	Free

Mid-season

Position	Player	Transferred From	Team	Ref
GK	(Singapore) Jarec Ng	(Singapore) Lion City Sailors U17	U21	Free
GK	(Singapore) Chua Choon Khai	(Singapore)	U13	Free
DF	(Australia) (Northern Ireland) Dylan Fox	(Finland) FC Lahti	First Team	Free
MF	(Singapore) Caden Lim Zheng Yi	Singapore Cricket Club	U21	Free
MF	(Singapore) Rae Peh Jun Wen	(Singapore) Lion City Sailors U21	U21	Free
MF	(Singapore) Joel Tan Wei Zhong	Singapore Sports School	U15	Free
MF	(Singapore) Qays Ilyasa	(Singapore) Albirex Niigata FC (S) U13	U13	Free
MF	(Singapore) Tanishq Vishak	(Singapore)	U13	Free
MF	(Singapore) Nurul Ariqah	(Singapore) Tiong Bahru FC	Women	Free
MF	(Singapore) Anna Seng	JSSL Singapore	Women	Free
MF	(Singapore) Nur Insyiarah Intikhab Perwaz	(Singapore) Geylang International	Women	Free
MF	(Singapore) Jayme Law	(Singapore) Tiong Bahru FC	Women	Free
MF	(Singapore) Nurul Asyura	(Singapore) Police SA	Women	Free
FW	(Japan) Itsuki Enomoto	(Singapore) BG Tampines Rovers	First Team	Free
FW	(France) (Cameroon) Alexandre Bertholon	(Singapore) Balestier Khalsa U21	U21	Free
FW	(Japan) (England) Caius Kai Jun Miles	(Japan) Albirex Niigata FC (S) U17	U17	Free
FW	(Singapore) Ethan Loh	(Singapore) Tanjong Pagar United U15	U15	Free
FW	(Singapore) Syed Ammar Harith	(Singapore)	U13	Free
FW	(China) Vanessa Han	JSSL Singapore	Women	Free
FW	(Mexico) Andrea Moska	(Singapore)	Women	Free

Postseason

Position	Player	Transferred From	Team	Ref
DF	(Singapore) Raoul Suhaimi	(Singapore) Young Lions	First Team	Free
MF	(Singapore) Fairuz Fazli Koh	(Singapore) Young Lions	First Team	Free

=== Loan in ===
Preseason

Position	Player	Transferred From	Team	Ref
DF	(Thailand) Thanet Suknate	(Thailand) BG Pathum United U18	First Team	Season loan till June 2025
FW	(Thailand) Thitipat Ekarunpong	(Thailand) BG Pathum United	First Team	Season loan till June 2025

Mid-season

Position	Player	Transferred From	Team	Ref
MF	(Japan) (Iran) Arya Igami Tarhani	(Japan) Albirex Niigata (S)	First team	Season loan
MF	(Thailand) Nanthiphat Chaiman	(Thailand) BG Pathum United U18	U21	Season loan till June 2025
MF	(Thailand) Witthawat Phraothaisong	(Thailand) BG Pathum United U18	U21	Season loan till June 2025

=== Loan return (In) ===
Mid-season

Position	Player	Transferred From	Team	Ref
MF	(Singapore) Marc Ryan Tan	(Singapore)	First Team	End of NS (Note: Marc Ryan Tan released by Tampines Rovers after returning to the team as his contract ended.)
MF	(Singapore) Ong Yu En	(Singapore) SAFSA	U21	End of NS

Postseason

Position	Player	Transferred From	Team	Ref
GK	(Singapore) Danial Iliya	(Singapore)	First Team	End of NS
DF	(Singapore) Andrew Aw	(Singapore) Young Lions	U21	End of NS (Note: Andrew Aw released by Tampines Rovers after returning to the team as his contract ended.)
MF	(Singapore) Iman Hakim	(Singapore) Police SA	First Team	End of NS
DF	(Singapore) Ryaan Sanizal	(Singapore) Young Lions	U21	End of NS

=== Out ===
Preseason

Position	Player	Transferred To	Team	Ref
GK	(Singapore) Jayden Khoo Zhen Yang	(Singapore)	U21	Free
GK	(Singapore) Alysha Nasrina	(Singapore) Geylang International (W)	Women	Free
GK	(Singapore) Hazel Lim Ya Ting	(Australia) Southern United	Women	Free
DF	(Singapore) Hamizan Hisham		First Team	Free
DF	(Singapore) Danish Irfan	(Singapore) Hougang United	First Team	Free
DF	(Singapore) Adam Reefdy	(Singapore) Hougang United U21	U21	Free
DF	(Singapore) Adam Ali	(Singapore) Hougang United U21	U21	Free
DF	(Singapore) Irfan Rifqi	(Singapore) Geylang International U21	U21	Free
DF	(Singapore) Rabi'atul Ardawiyah	(Japan) Albirex Niigata (S) (W)	Women	Free
DF	(Singapore) Charis Han	(United States) IMG Academy	Women	Free
MF	(Singapore) Firdaus Kasman	(Singapore) Yishun Sentek Mariners FC	First Team	Free
MF	(Singapore) Irgy Zulkifli	(Singapore) Geylang International U21	U17	Free
MF	(Singapore) Afiqah Omar	(Japan) Albirex Niigata (S) (W)	Women	Free
MF	(Singapore) Eva Rushdina	(Singapore) Balestier Khalsa (W)	Women	Free
MF	(Singapore) Anna Seng	(Singapore)	Women	Free
MF	(Singapore) Mayvin	(Singapore) Mattar City Sailors (W)	Women	Free
FW	(Singapore) Lim Zheng Wu	(Singapore) Young Lions	U21	Free
FW	(Singapore) Ali Manaf	(Singapore)	U21	Free
FW	(Singapore) Nahwah Aidilreza	(Japan) Albirex Niigata (S) (W)	Women	Free
FW	(Singapore) Nur Farhanah Ruhaizat	(Singapore) Geylang International (W)	Women	Free
FW	(Singapore) Zoe Breen	(Singapore)	Women	Free
FW	(Singapore) Hannah Tasha	(Singapore) Still Aerion WFC	Women	Free
FW	(Singapore) Stephanie Gigette	(Australia) Casey Comets FC	Women	Free

Mid-season

Position	Player	Transferred To	Team	Ref
DF	(Singapore) Adrian Jaccard	(Singapore)	U21	Free
GK	(Singapore) Luthfi Sufaiqish	(Singapore) Lion City Sailors U17	U17	Free
DF	(Singapore) Aryton Jude	(Singapore)	U13	Free
DF	(Singapore) Matin Manaf	(Singapore) Hougang United FC U21	U17	Free
MF	(Singapore) Akaash Xavier	(Singapore)	U13	Free
MF	(Singapore) Danial Bazil	(Singapore)	U13	Free
MF	(France) Priscille Le Helloco	(Singapore) Lion City Sailors (W)	Women	Free
MF	(Singapore) Nurhidayu Naszri	(Singapore) Lion City Sailors (W)	Women	Free
MF	(Singapore) Nur Dawisyah Noor Haidi	(Japan) Albirex Niigata (S) (W)	Women	Free
MF	(Singapore) Roszieva Roslan	(Singapore)	Women	Free
MF	(Singapore) Afiqah Asari	(Singapore)	Women	Free
MF	(Singapore) Nadira Nur Dhamirah	(Singapore)	Women	Free
MF	(Singapore) Joel Tan Wei Zhong	(Spain) Alcobendas CF U14	U15	Free
MF	(Singapore) (France) Lukyan Tan Ye Yi	(Spain) Rayo Ciudad Alcobendas Academy	U15	Free
MF	(Singapore) Elfyan Erdannie	(Singapore)	U15	Free
MF	(Singapore) Muhamad Nur Danial	(Singapore) Hougang United FC U21	U17	Free
FW	(Montenegro) Boris Kopitović	(Indonesia) Bali United	First Team	Free
FW	(Singapore) Marc Ryan Tan	(Singapore)	First Team	Free
FW	(Singapore) Heroshi Rudy Kurniawan	(Singapore) Balestier Khalsa U17	U17	Free
FW	(Singapore) Irfan Haziq	(Singapore) Geylang International FC U17	U17	Free
FW	(Japan) (England) Caius Kai Jun Miles	(Singapore) Geylang International FC U17	U17	Free
FW	(Singapore) Aqel Razali	(Singapore) Geylang International FC U17	U17	Free
FW	(Singapore) Ashraf Hizahar	(Singapore) Tanjong Pagar United U15	U15	Free
FW	(Singapore) Nabeel Al Lutfi	(Singapore) Geylang International FC U15	U15	Free
FW	(Singapore) Aaril Bazli	(Singapore) Geylang International FC U13	U13	Free
FW	(United States) (Ecuador) Victoria Sarka	(Singapore) Geylang International (W)	Women	Free

Postseason

Position	Player	Transferred From	Team	Ref
MF	(Singapore) Yasir Hanapi	Retired	First Team	N.A.
FW	(Japan) Seia Kunori	(Thailand) Bangkok United	Free	

=== Loan out ===
Preseason

Position	Player	Transferred To	Team	Ref
MF	(Singapore) Marc Ryan Tan	(Singapore)	First Team	NS till October 2024
GK	(Singapore) Danial Iliya	(Singapore)	First Team	NS till February 2025
DF	(Singapore) Andrew Aw	(Singapore) Young Lions	U21	NS till February 2025
MF	(Singapore) Iman Hakim	(Singapore) Police SA	First Team	NS till February 2025
MF	(Singapore) Ong Yu En	(Singapore) SAFSA	U21	NS till July 2025
DF	(Singapore) Ryaan Sanizal	(Singapore) Young Lions	U21	NS till Aug 2025
MF	(Singapore) (India) Neel Manoj Nannat	(Singapore) SAFSA	U21	NS till July 2025
MF	(Singapore) (Indonesia) Matthias Josaphat Koesno	(Singapore) SAFSA	U21	NS till March 2026
MF	(Singapore) Syed Firdaus Hassan	(Japan) Albirex Niigata (S)	First Team	Season loan till May 2025
MF	(Singapore) Rezza Rezky	(Singapore) Tanjong Pagar United	First Team	Season loan till May 2025

Mid-season

Position	Player	Transferred To	Team	Ref
DF	(Singapore) Syahrul Sazali	(Japan) Albirex Niigata (S)	First team	Season-long loan till May 2025
DF	(Singapore) (Republic of Ireland) Jared Gallagher	(Singapore) Balestier Khalsa	First Team	Season-long loan till May 2025
MF	(Singapore) Saifullah Akbar	(Singapore) Geylang International	First Team	Season loan till May 2025
GK	(Singapore) (Sri Lanka) Pasindu Yapa	(Singapore) SAFSA	U21	NS till November 2026
DF	(Singapore) Jovan Ang	(Singapore) SAFSA	U21	NS till November 2026
DF	(Singapore) Marcus Heng	(Singapore)	U21	NS till November 2026
MF	(Singapore) Ryan Peh Jun Wen	(Singapore) SAFSA	U21	NS till November 2026
MF	(Singapore) Caelan Cheong Tze Jay	(Singapore) SAFSA	U21	NS till November 2026
GK	(Singapore) (France) Nicolas Michael Beninger	(Singapore) SAFSA	U21	NS till November 2026

=== Loan Return (Out) ===
Mid-season

Position	Player	Transferred From	Team	Ref
DF	(Thailand) Thanet Suknate	(Thailand) BG Pathum United U18	First Team	End of loan
FW	(Thailand) Thitipat Ekarunpong	(Thailand) BG Pathum United	First Team	End of loan

=== Extension and retained ===
First Team

Position	Player	Ref
Coach	(Singapore) Gavin Lee	6 years contract till 2028
GK	(Singapore) Danial Iliya	1-year contract till 2023 (Note: Extended & loan to GYL during NS)
GK	(Singapore) Syazwan Buhari	2 years contract from 2021 till 2023
DF	(Singapore) Ryaan Sanizal	2 years contract from 2021 till 2025
DF	(Singapore) Amirul Haikal	2 years contract from 2021 till 2023
DF	(Singapore) Irfan Najeeb	1-year contract till 2023
DF	(Japan) Shuya Yamashita	1.5 years contract from Jan 2024 till Jun 2025
DF	(Serbia) Miloš Zlatković	1.5 years contract from Jan 2024 till Jun 2025
MF	(Singapore) Shah Shahiran	5 years contract from 2023 till 2027
MF	(Japan) Kyoga Nakamura	5 years contract from 2022 till 2026
MF	(Singapore) Syed Firdaus	2.5 years contract till June 2025
MF	(Singapore) Joel Chew	5 years contract from 2023 till 2027
MF	(Singapore) Rezza Rezky	1-year contract till 2023
MF	(Singapore) Ong Yu En	3-years contract till 2025
MF	(Singapore) Iman Hakim	3 years contract till 2025
FW	(Montenegro) Boris Kopitovic	1.5 years contract from Jan 2024 till Jun 2025
FW	(Singapore) (Indonesia) Taufik Suparno	1-year contract till 2023

U21

Position	Player	Ref
GK	(Singapore) Jayden Khoo	1-year contract till 2023 (U21)
DF	(Singapore) Andrew Aw	3 years contract till 2025 (U21)
DF	(Singapore) Adam Reefdy	3 years contract till 2025 (U21)
DF	(Singapore) (Bosnia and Herzegovina) Zeeshan Iskandar	1-year contract till 2023 (U21)
MF	(Singapore) Anton Yen Goh	1-year contract till 2023 (U21)
MF	(Singapore) (India) Neel Manoj Nannat	1-year contract till 2023 (U21)
MF	(Singapore) Yusril Hanapi	1-year contract till 2023 (U21)
FW	(Singapore) Ali Manaf	1-year contract till 2023 (U21)

== Friendlies ==
=== Pre-season ===
Win Draw Loss

SPL Interim Tournament – 23 Feb to 21 Apr

24 February 2024 1	BG Tampines Rovers (Singapore)	4–1	(Singapore) Young Lions FC	Tampines
	Boris Kopitović 39' (pen.); Shuya Yamashita 43'; Miloš Zlatković 70'; Saifullah Akbar 78' (pen.)	Report	Itsuki Enomoto 20'	Stadium: Our Tampines Hub; Referee: Clarence Leow

2 March 2024 2	BG Tampines Rovers (Singapore)	3–0	(Singapore) Hougang United	Jalan Besar
	Joel Chew 7'; Boris Kopitović 85'; Seia Kunori 90+1'			Stadium: Jalan Besar Stadium

9 March 2024 3	BG Tampines Rovers (Singapore)	7–1	(Japan) Albirex Niigata (S)	Jalan Besar
	Faris Ramli 8'; Boris Kopitović 20'; Miloš Zlatković 45+2'; Shah Shahiran 55'; Irfan Najeeb 74'; Saifullah Akbar 82'; Caelan Cheong 85'		Arya Igami Tarhani 64'	Stadium: Jalan Besar Stadium

12 April 2024 4	BG Tampines Rovers (Singapore)	3–3	(Singapore) Balestier Khalsa	Jalan Besar
	Faris Ramli 7', 64'; Shah Shahiran 36'		Ismail Sassi 25'; Amiruldin Asraf 90', 90+4'	Stadium: Jalan Besar Stadium

21 April 2024 5	BG Tampines Rovers (Singapore)	13–1	(Singapore) Lion City Sailors	Bishan
	Seia Kunori 1', 8'; Seia Kunori 6'; Boris Kopitović 16', 18', 32', 45'; Shah Shahiran 55'; Thitipat Ekarunpong 71', 78'; Caelan Cheong 76'; Taufik Suparno 76'		Kian Ghadessy 66'	Stadium: Bishan Stadium

=== Mid-season ===
10 January 2025	BG Tampines Rovers (Singapore)	1–1	(Singapore) Albirex Niigata (S)	Jurong East
				Stadium: Jurong East Stadium

== Team statistics ==
=== Appearances and goals ===
As of 31 May 2025

No.	Pos.	Player	SPL		Singapore Cup		AFC Champions League Two		Total	
No.	Pos.	Player	Apps.	Goals	Apps.	Goals	Apps.	Goals	Apps.	Goals
4	DF	(Japan) Shuya Yamashita	30	1	7	1	6	1	43	3
5	DF	(Singapore) Amirul Adli	21+8	1	3+3	0	5+1	1	41	2
6	MF	(Singapore) Ong Yu En	0+2	0	0	0	0	0	2	0
7	FW	(Japan) Seia Kunori	32	17	7	2	5+1	6	45	25
8	MF	(Singapore) Shah Shahiran	30+1	0	7	2	6	1	44	3
9	FW	(Japan) Itsuki Enomoto	11	6	7	3	0	0	18	9
10	MF	(Singapore) (Japan) Kyoga Nakamura	31+1	4	7	0	6	0	45	4
11	FW	(Singapore) Glenn Kweh	26+6	7	7	1	4+2	0	45	8
12	MF	(Singapore) Joel Chew	13+8	1	5+2	1	2+3	0	33	2
13	FW	(Singapore) Taufik Suparno	3+24	6	0+6	0	4+2	0	39	6
14	FW	(Japan) (Iran) Arya Igami Tarhani	2+8	1	1+4	1	0	0	15	2
16	DF	(Australia) (Northern Ireland) Dylan Fox	11+1	0	6	1	0	0	18	1
17	DF	(Singapore) Amirul Haikal	0+4	0	0	0	0	0	4	0
18	MF	(Singapore) Yasir Hanapi	4+25	1	0+5	0	0+4	0	38	1
20	MF	(Singapore) Saifullah Akbar	5+10	0	0	0	1+1	0	17	0
23	DF	(Singapore) Irfan Najeeb	21+5	4	5+1	0	1+3	0	36	4
24	GK	(Singapore) Syazwan Buhari	30	0	7	0	6	0	43	0
30	FW	(Singapore) Faris Ramli	21+7	10	1+4	2	2+4	1	39	13
31	GK	(Singapore) Ridhuan Barudin	1	0	0	0	0	0	1	0
33	DF	(Serbia) Miloš Zlatković	30	7	7	0	6	0	43	7
51	MF	(Singapore) Taras Goh	0+1	0	0	0	0	0	1	0
55	DF	(Singapore) Kegan Phang Jun	0+2	0	0+1	0	0+1	0	4	0
59	MF	(Thailand) Nanthiphat Chaiman	0+3	0	0	0	0	0	3	0
76	MF	(Singapore) Rae Peh	0	0	0+1	0	0	0	1	0
80	MF	(Singapore) Kieran Tan	0+2	0	0	0	0	0	2	0
Players who have played this season and/or sign for the season but had left the club or on loan to other club
6	MF	(Singapore) (Republic of Ireland) Jared Gallagher	11+7	0	0	0	5+1	0	24	0
9	FW	(Montenegro) Boris Kopitović	18+2	16	0	0	6	1	26	17
15	MF	(Singapore) Syed Firdaus Hassan	0	0	0	0	0	0	0	0
22	DF	(Singapore) Syahrul Sazali	0+4	0	0	0	1	0	5	0
18	MF	(Singapore) Rezza Rezky	0	0	0	0	0	0	0	0
52	FW	(Thailand) Thitipat Ekarunpong	0+1	0	0	0	0	0	1	0
54	MF	(Singapore) Jovan Ang	0	0	0	0	0	0	0	0
58	MF	(Singapore) Caelan Cheong Tze Jay	0+4	0	0	0	0	0	4	0
59	MF	(Thailand) Nanthiphat Chaiman	0+1	0	0	0	0	0	1	0
62	DF	(Thailand) Thanet Suknate	0+2	0	0	0	0	0	2	0

== Competitions ==
=== Overview ===
Competition	Record							
Competition	P	W	D	L	GF	GA	GD	Win %
Singapore Premier League	25	15	6	4	72	32	+40	60.00
Singapore Cup	4	3	1	0	12	4	+8	75.00
AFC Champions League Two	6	2	2	2	11	11	+0	33.33
Total	35	20	9	6	95	47	+48	57.14

Results summary (SPL)

Overall								Home						Away					
Pld	W	D	L	GF	GA	GD	Pts	W	D	L	GF	GA	GD	W	D	L	GF	GA	GD
0	0	0	0	0	0	0	0	0	0	0	0	0	0	0	0	0	0	0	0

=== Singapore Premier League ===
Win Draw Loss

12 May 2024 1	BG Tampines Rovers (Singapore)	3–1	(Japan) Albirex Niigata (S)	Jalan Besar
	Seia Kunori 62', 73'; Boris Kopitović 87'; Miloš Zlatković (yellow card) 28'		Daniel Goh 38'; Ho Wai Loon (yellow card) 48'; Koki Kawachi (yellow card) 61'; Yojiro Takahagi (yellow card) 78'	Stadium: Jalan Besar Stadium; Referee: Jansen Foo; Man of the Match: (Japan) Seia Kunori

17 May 2024 2	Geylang International (Singapore)	4–4	(Singapore) BG Tampines Rovers	Jalan Besar
	Amirul Adli 21' (o.g.); Tomoyuki Doi 34'; Naqiuddin Eunos 61'; Ryoya Tanigushi 75'; Joshua Pereira (yellow card) 52'		Boris Kopitović 6' (pen.); Miloš Zlatković 11'; Taufik Suparno 83', 84'; Amirul Adli (yellow card) 44'; Shuya Yamashita (yellow card) 69'	Stadium: Jalan Besar Stadium; Referee: Andrea Verolino; Man of the Match: (Singapore) Taufik Suparno

24 May 2024 3	Balestier Khalsa (Singapore)	2–4	(Singapore) BG Tampines Rovers	Bishan
	Kodai Tanaka 29', 49'; Darren Teh (yellow card) 54'		Boris Kopitović 2'; Seia Kunori 12'; Miloš Zlatković 63' (yellow card) 71'; Faris Ramli 89' (yellow card) 65'	Stadium: Bishan Stadium; Referee: Muhammad Taqi; Man of the Match: (Montenegro) Boris Kopitović

16 June 2024 4	BG Tampines Rovers (Singapore)	3–0	(Singapore) Tanjong Pagar United	Jalan Besar
	Boris Kopitović 6' (pen.); Glenn Kweh 61'; Seia Kunori 63'; Miloš Zlatković (yellow card) 77'		Zenivio (yellow card) 79'	Stadium: Jalan Besar Stadium; Referee: Hilmi Fuad; Man of the Match: (Japan) Kyoga Nakamura

30 June 2024 5	BG Tampines Rovers (Singapore)	5–1	(Singapore) Hougang United	Jalan Besar
	Glenn Kweh 11'; Faris Ramli 46'; Irfan Najeeb 54', 82'; Boris Kopitović 68'; Taufik Suparno (yellow card) 88'		Dejan Račić 24'; Ajay Robson (yellow card) 13'; Faris Hasic (yellow card) 51'; Justin Hui (yellow card) 81'; Adam Reefdy (yellow card) 89'	Stadium: Jalan Besar Stadium; Referee: Ahmad A'Qashah; Man of the Match: (Singapore) Irfan Najeeb

6 July 2024 6	Young Lions (Singapore)	0–2	(Singapore) BG Tampines Rovers	Jalan Besar
	Kieran Teo Jia Jun (yellow card) 35'; Nur Adam Abdullah (yellow card) 72'		Seia Kunori 5'; Boris Kopitović 50' (pen.); Kyoga Nakamura (yellow card) 20'; Shah Shahiran (yellow card) 53'	Stadium: Jalan Besar Stadium; Referee: Clarence Leow; Man of the Match: (Japan) Seia Kunori

13 July 2024 7	BG Tampines Rovers (Singapore)	3–0	(Brunei) DPMM	Jalan Besar
	Boris Kopitović 29', 88'; Nurikhwan Othman 62' (o.g.); Amirul Adli (yellow card) 73'; Irfan Najeeb (yellow card) 90'			Stadium: Jalan Besar Stadium; Referee: Jansen Foo; Man of the Match: (Montenegro) Boris Kopitović

18 July 2024 8	Lion City Sailors (Singapore)	0–5	(Singapore) BG Tampines Rovers	Bishan
			Boris Kopitović 45+1', 47' (yellow card) 7'; Glenn Kweh 45+4'; Faris Ramli 50'; Irfan Najeeb 57'; Amirul Adli (yellow card) 35'	Stadium: Bishan Stadium; Referee: Farhan Mohd; Man of the Match: (Singapore) Irfan Najeeb

24 July 2024 9	BG Tampines Rovers (Singapore)	2–2	(Singapore) Geylang International	Jalan Besar
	Glenn Kweh 26'; Seia Kunori 75'; Miloš Zlatković (yellow card) 57'; Irfan Najeeb (yellow card) 69'; Taufik Suparno (yellow card) 90+3'		Ryoya Tanigushi 55'; Rio Sakuma 90+4'; Shakir Hamzah (yellow card) 21'; Naqiuddin Eunos (yellow card) 67'	Stadium: Jalan Besar Stadium; Referee: Jansen Foo; Man of the Match: (Japan) Rio Sakuma

27 July 2024 10	Albirex Niigata (S) (Japan)	2–4	(Singapore) BG Tampines Rovers	Jurong East
	Arya Igami Tarhani 49'; Shingo Nakano 62'; Ho Wai Loon (yellow card) 51'		Seia Kunori 15'; Boris Kopitović 33' (pen.); Shuya Yamashita 53'; Yasir Hanapi 57'	Stadium: Jurong East Stadium; Referee: Andrea Verolino; Man of the Match: (Japan) Seia Kunori

3 August 2024 11	Tanjong Pagar United (Singapore)	0–3	(Singapore) BG Tampines Rovers	Jurong East
	Zenivio (yellow card) 43'		Boris Kopitović 12'; Seia Kunori 25'; Faris Ramli 45'	Stadium: Jurong East Stadium; Referee: Muhammad Taqi; Man of the Match: (Japan) Shuya Yamashita

11 August 2024 12	Balestier Khalsa (Singapore)	2–2	(Singapore) BG Tampines Rovers	Bishan
	Ismail Sassi 45'; Kodai Tanaka 90+6' (pen.); Harith Kanadi (yellow card) 24'; Masahiro Sugita (yellow card) 64'		Seia Kunori 12'; Taufik Suparno 79'; Miloš Zlatković (yellow card) 55'; Shah Shahiran (yellow card) 85'; Amirul Adli (yellow card) 90+5'	Stadium: Bishan Stadium; Referee: Farhan Mohd; Man of the Match: (Japan) Kodai Tanaka

30 August 2024 13	Hougang United (Singapore)	1–1	(Singapore) BG Tampines Rovers	Jalan Besar
	Ensar Brunčević 31'; Ismail Salihović (yellow card) 32' (yellow-red card) 90+3'; Stjepan Plazonja (yellow card) 90+1'		Seia Kunori 44'; Taufik Suparno (red card) 90'; Shah Shahiran (yellow card) 90+5'	Stadium: Jalan Besar Stadium; Referee: Hilmi Fuad; Man of the Match: (Serbia) Ensar Brunčević

14 September 2024 14	BG Tampines Rovers (Singapore)	2–2	(Singapore) Young Lions	Jalan Besar
	Kaisei Ogawa 20'; Itsuki Enomoto 50'; Ryaan Sanizal (yellow card) 7'; Syafi Hilman (yellow card) 70'; Aizil Yazid (yellow card) 90+5'		Joel Chew 61'; Miloš Zlatković 77'	Stadium: Jalan Besar Stadium; Referee: Andrea Verolino; Man of the Match: (Japan) Kaisei Ogawa

22 September 2024 15	DPMM (Brunei)	3–2	(Singapore) BG Tampines Rovers	Bandar Seri Begawan
	Miguel Oliveira 14', 86'; Nazirrudin Ismail 85'; Haimie Abdullah Nyaring (yellow card) 37'		Glenn Kweh 48'; Boris Kopitović 59'	Stadium: Hassanal Bolkiah National Stadium; Referee: Zulfiqar Mustaffa; Man of the Match: (Portugal) Miguel Oliveira

29 September 2024 16	BG Tampines Rovers (Singapore)	2–2	(Singapore) Lion City Sailors	Jalan Besar
	Faris Ramli 48'; Boris Kopitović 55' (penalty missed) 40		Shawal Anuar 8', 88'; Song Ui-young (yellow card) 83'	Stadium: Jalan Besar Stadium; Referee: Ahmad A'Qashah; Man of the Match: (Singapore) Shawal Anuar

19 October 2024 17	BG Tampines Rovers (Singapore)	2–3	(Japan) Albirex Niigata (S)	Jalan Besar
	Kyoga Nakamura 55'; Faris Ramli 60' (yellow card) 66'; Saifullah Akbar (yellow card) 28'; Joel Chew (yellow card) 62'		Yohei Otake 12'; Shingo Nakano 45+2'; Daniel Goh 85'; Ryhan Stewart (yellow card) 90+2'	Stadium: Jalan Besar Stadium; Referee: Muhammad Taqi; Man of the Match: (Singapore) Daniel Goh

29 October 2024 18 (Rescheduled)	Geylang International (Singapore)	0–3	(Singapore) BG Tampines Rovers	Jalan Besar
			Kyoga Nakamura 34' (yellow card) 31'; Miloš Zlatković 64'; Taufik Suparno 82'; Glenn Kweh (yellow card) 54'; Shuya Yamashita (yellow card) 67'	Stadium: Jalan Besar Stadium; Referee: Hilmi Fuad; Man of the Match: (Japan) Kyoga Nakamura

2 November 2024 19	BG Tampines Rovers (Singapore)	3–1	(Singapore) Balestier Khalsa	Jalan Besar
	Irfan Najeeb 48'; Faris Ramli 70'; Seia Kunori 80'; Shah Shahiran (yellow card) 67'; Taufik Suparno (yellow card) 76'; Jared Gallagher (yellow card) 90+1'		Riku Fukashiro 72'; Harith Kanadi (yellow card) 52'; Alen Kozar (yellow card) 76'	Stadium: Jalan Besar Stadium; Referee: Clarence Leow; Man of the Match: (Japan) Seia Kunori

22 November 2024 20 (Rescheduled)	BG Tampines Rovers (Singapore)	5–0	(Singapore) Tanjong Pagar United	Jalan Besar
	Faris Ramli 18'; Seia Kunori 21'; Glenn Kweh 47'; Boris Kopitović 54', 86' (pen.)		Umar Ramlee (yellow card) 58'	Stadium: Jalan Besar Stadium; Referee: Ahmad A'Qashah; Man of the Match: (Montenegro) Boris Kopitović

25 January 2025 21	BG Tampines Rovers (Singapore)	2–4	(Singapore) Hougang United	Jalan Besar
	Taufik Suparno 13'; Seia Kunori 58'; Miloš Zlatković (yellow card) 68'		Stjepan Plazonja 11'; Zulfahmi Arifin 21' (yellow card) 90+1'; Gabriel Quak 89'; Dejan Račić 90+5' (pen.); Daniel Alemão (yellow card) 52'	Stadium: Jalan Besar Stadium; Referee: Ahmad A'Qashah; Man of the Match: (Montenegro) Dejan Račić

8 February 2025 22	Young Lions (Singapore)	1–5	(Singapore) BG Tampines Rovers	Jalan Besar
	Amir Syafiz 51'		Miloš Zlatković 21'; Glenn Kweh 37'; Itsuki Enomoto 59'; Ethan Pinto 69' (o.g.); Amirul Adli 71'; Nanthiphat Chaiman (yellow card) 79'; Dylan Fox (yellow card) 89'	Stadium: Jalan Besar Stadium; Referee: Farhan Mohd; Man of the Match: (Singapore) Glenn Kweh

23 February 2025 23	BG Tampines Rovers (Singapore)	1–0	(Brunei) DPMM	Jalan Besar
	Damir Muminovic 61' (o.g.); Kyoga Nakamura (yellow card) 90+9'		Abdul Hariz Herman (yellow card) 24'; Gabriel Gama (yellow card) 51'; Miguel Oliveira (yellow card) 81'	Stadium: Jalan Besar Stadium; Referee: Clarence Leow; Man of the Match: (Serbia) Miloš Zlatković

26 February 2025 24	Lion City Sailors (Singapore)	1–0	(Singapore) BG Tampines Rovers	Bishan
	Lionel Tan 81'; Maxime Lestienne (yellow card) 90+1'			Stadium: Bishan Stadium; Referee: Farhan Mohd; Man of the Match: (Portugal) Rui Pires

9 March 2025 25	Albirex Niigata (S) (Japan)	0–4	(Singapore) BG Tampines Rovers	Jurong East
	Naoki Yoshioka (yellow card) 35'; Ryhan Stewart (yellow card) 51'; Shingo Nakano (yellow card) 61'		Itsuki Enomoto 27'; Arya Igami Tarhani 47'; Seia Kunori 52'; Miloš Zlatković 81'	Stadium: Jurong East Stadium; Referee: Clarence Leow; Man of the Match: (Japan) Seia Kunori

4 April 2025 26	BG Tampines Rovers (Singapore)	3–1	(Singapore) Geylang International	Jalan Besar
	Miloš Zlatković 3' (yellow card) 23'; Itsuki Enomoto 19'; Seia Kunori 41'		Shakir Hamzah 34'; Rio Sakuma (yellow card) 22'; Syafi Suhaimi (yellow card) 86'	Stadium: Jalan Besar Stadium; Referee: Farhan Mohd; Man of the Match: (Japan) Itsuki Enomoto

11 April 2025 27 (Rescheduled)	Tanjong Pagar United (Singapore)	0–2	(Singapore) BG Tampines Rovers	Jurong East
	Azim Akbar (yellow card) 47'; Marcus Mosses (yellow card) 82'		Faris Ramli 40', 60'; Shah Shahiran (yellow card) 23'	Stadium: Jurong East Stadium; Referee: Oswind Suriya; Man of the Match: (Singapore) Faris Ramli

7 May 2025 28 (Rescheduled)	BG Tampines Rovers (Singapore)	0–1	(Singapore) Balestier Khalsa	Jalan Besar
			Kodai Tanaka 11'; Fudhil I’yadh (yellow card) 33'; Masahiro Sugita (red card) 59'	Stadium: Jalan Besar Stadium; Referee: Ahmad A'Qashah; Man of the Match: (Singapore) Hafiz Ahmad

2 May 2025 29	Hougang United (Singapore)	1–4	(Singapore) BG Tampines Rovers	Tampines
	Stjepan Plazonja 4'; Hazzuwan Halim (yellow card) 43'; Jordan Vestering (yellow card) 63'; Ismail Salihović (yellow card) 84'		Itsuki Enomoto 37', 53'; Seia Kunori 47' (yellow card) 36'; Taufik Suparno 87' (yellow card) 82'; Shuya Yamashita (yellow card) 76'	Stadium: Our Tampines Hub (Note: Location changed to Our Tampines Hub due to General Election 2025 and potential closures of selected ActiveSG facilities, including stadiums that are typically used for SPL fixtures); Referee: Clarence Leow; Man of the Match: (Japan) Itsuki Enomoto

10 May 2025 30	BG Tampines Rovers (Singapore)	2–0	(Singapore) Young Lions	Jalan Besar
	Itsuki Enomoto 10'; Kyoga Nakamura 60'; Miloš Zlatković (yellow card) 88'			Stadium: Jalan Besar Stadium; Referee: Hilmi Fuad; Man of the Match: (Japan) Kyoga Nakamura

17 May 2025 31	DPMM (Brunei)	2–1	(Singapore) BG Tampines Rovers	Bandar Seri Begawan
	Nazirrudin Ismail 6', 33'; Azwan Ali Rahman (yellow card) 75'; Gabriel Gama (yellow card) 90+3'		Seia Kunori 23'; Taufik Suparno (yellow card) 78'; Shah Shahiran (yellow card) 90'	Stadium: Hassanal Bolkiah National Stadium; Referee: Ahmad A'Qashah

24 May 2025 32	BG Tampines Rovers (Singapore)	0–0	(Singapore) Lion City Sailors	Jalan Besar
			Zulqarnaen Suzliman (yellow card) 5'; Abdul Rasaq (yellow card) 64'	Stadium: Jalan Besar Stadium; Referee: Muhammad Taqi; Man of the Match: (Singapore) Zharfan Rohaizad

Pos	Team	Pld	W	D	L	GF	GA	GD	Pts	Qualification or relegation
1	Lion City Sailors (C)	32	22	6	4	96	32	+64	72	Qualification for Champions League Two group stage & ASEAN Club Championship (Note: Since the winners of the 2024–25 Singapore Cup, Lion City Sailors, had already qualified for the AFC Champions League Two and ASEAN Club Championship, the spot given to the Singapore Cup winners (Champions League Two) was passed to the second-placed team.)
2	BG Tampines Rovers	32	19	7	6	84	37	+47	64	Qualification for Champions League Two group stage & ASEAN Club Championship
3	Geylang International	32	15	9	8	97	64	+33	54	
4	Balestier Khalsa	32	14	6	12	84	80	+4	48	
5	DPMM (Note: Ineligible for AFC competition spots)	32	12	8	12	54	61	−7	44	Transferred to the 2025–26 Malaysia Super League post-season
6	Albirex Niigata (S)	32	13	3	16	55	71	−16	42	
7	Hougang United	32	7	10	15	61	76	−15	31	
8	Young Lions	32	7	8	17	47	89	−42	29	
9	Tanjong Pagar United	32	3	7	22	35	103	−68	16	

Updated to match(es) played on 25 May 2025. Source: Singapore Premier League
Rules for classification: 1) points; 2) goal difference; 3) number of goals scored; 4) number of wins
(C) Champions

=== Singapore Cup ===
Pos	Team	Pld	W	D	L	GF	GA	GD	Pts	Qualification
1	BG Tampines Rovers	4	3	1	0	12	4	+8	10	Semi-finals
2	DPMM	4	2	1	1	7	7	0	7	Semi-finals
3	Young Lions	4	2	0	2	11	7	+4	6	
4	Hougang United	4	2	0	2	8	10	−2	6	
5	Albirex Niigata (S)	4	0	0	4	4	14	−10	0	

Source: FAS

1 February 2025 Group Match 1	BG Tampines Rovers (Singapore)	1–1	(Brunei) DPMM FC	Jalan Besar
	Seia Kunori 80'; Shah Shahiran (yellow card) 53'; Irfan Najeeb (yellow card) 73'; Taufik Suparno (yellow card) 74'; Syazwan Buhari (yellow card) 89'		Nazry Aiman Azaman 90+5'; Farshad Noor (yellow card) 78'	Stadium: Jalan Besar Stadium; Referee: Muhammad Taqi

15 February 2025 Group Match 2	Albriex Niigata (S) (Japan)	1–2	(Singapore) BG Tampines Rovers	Jurong East
	Arshad Shamim 82'		Arya Igami Tarhani 52'; Koki Kawachi 64' (o.g.); Joel Chew (yellow card) 82'	Stadium: Jurong East Stadium; Referee: Hilmi Fuad

16 March 2025 Group Match 3	BG Tampines Rovers (Singapore)	4–1	(Singapore) Young Lions	Jalan Besar
	Itsuki Enomoto 20', 32'; Shah Shahiran 22'; Joel Chew 47'; Taufik Suparno (yellow card) 67'; Dylan Fox (yellow card) 90+6'		Jun Kobayashi 66'	Stadium: Jalan Besar Stadium; Referee: Ahmad A'Qashah

29 March 2025 Group Match 4	Hougang United (Singapore)	1–5	(Singapore) BG Tampines Rovers	Jalan Besar
	Louka Tan 80'		Itsuki Enomoto 50'; Shah Shahiran 65' (pen.); Dylan Fox 82' (yellow card) 55'; Faris Ramli 84', 90+4'	Stadium: Jalan Besar Stadium; Referee: Muhammad Taqi

16 April 2025 Semi Final Leg 1	BG Pathum United (Thailand)	1–1	(Singapore) BG Tampines Rovers	Jalan Besar
	Shuya Yamashita 3'; Kyoga Nakamura (yellow card) 32'; Shah Shahiran (yellow card) 61'	Report	Kodai Tanaka 35'; Kanokpon Buspakom (yellow card) 62'; Hwang Myung-hyun (yellow card) 72'; Airfan Doloh (yellow card) 77'	Stadium: Jalan Besar Stadium; Referee: Andrea Verolino

27 May 2025 Semi Final Leg 2	BG Tampines Rovers (Singapore)	3–2 (a.e.t.) (4–3 agg.)	(Thailand) BG Pathum United	Jalan Besar
	Glenn Kweh 16'; Seia Kunori 58'; Sarach Yooyen 114' (o.g.); Irfan Najeeb (yellow card) 42'; Taufik Suparno (yellow card) 120+5'		Seydine N'Diaye 41', 76'; Sanchai Nontasila (yellow card) 45'; Hwang Myung-hyun (yellow card) 85'; Sarach Yooyen (yellow card) 89'; Freddy Álvarez (yellow card) 95'; Ikhsan Fandi (yellow card) 120'; Airfan Doloh (yellow card) 120+2'	Stadium: Jalan Besar Stadium; Referee: Ahmad A'Qashah

31 May 2025 Final	BG Tampines Rovers (Singapore)	0–1	(Singapore) Lion City Sailors	Jalan Besar
	Miloš Zlatković (yellow card) 85'; Shah Shahiran (red card) 93'	Report	Bart Ramselaar 49' (yellow card) 90'; Song Ui-young (yellow card) 45+1'	Stadium: Jalan Besar Stadium; Attendance: 2,766; Referee: Muhammad Taqi

=== AFC Champions League Two ===
==== Group stage ====
Pos	Team	Pld	W	D	L	GF	GA	GD	Pts	Qualification	BKU	NDI	TAM	LMC
1	(Thailand) Bangkok United	6	4	1	1	12	6	+6	13	Advance to round of 16	—	3–2	4–2	4–1
2	(Vietnam) Nam Định	6	3	2	1	13	8	+5	11	Advance to round of 16	0–0	—	3–2	3–0
3	(Singapore) Tampines Rovers	6	2	2	2	11	11	0	8		1–0	3–3	—	3–1
4	(Hong Kong) Lee Man	6	0	1	5	2	13	−11	1		0–1	0–2	0–0	—

Source: AFC
Rules for classification: Tiebreakers

18 September 2024 Matchday 1	Bangkok United (Thailand)	4–2	(Singapore) BG Tampines Rovers	Pathum Than, Thailand
	Muhsen Al-Ghassani 45+2', 63'; Richairo Zivkovic 77' (pen.); Bassel Jradi 90+5'	Report	Seia Kunori 53', 72'; Miloš Zlatković (yellow card) 60'	Stadium: Thammasat Stadium; Attendance: 899; Referee: Pranjal Banerjee (India)

2 October 2024 Matchday 2	BG Tampines Rovers (Singapore)	3–1	(Hong Kong) Lee Man	Jalan Besar, Singapore
	Boris Kopitović 45+3' (pen.); Faris Ramli 65'; Seia Kunori 75'; Miloš Zlatković (yellow card) 63'; Kyoga Nakamura (yellow card) 79'	Report	Li Ngai Hoi 4' (yellow card) 89'	Stadium: Jalan Besar Stadium (Note: Tampines Rovers played their home matches at Jalan Besar Stadium, Kallang, instead of their regular home stadium Our Tampines Hub, Tampines.); Attendance: 883; Referee: Kim Woo-sung (South Korea)

24 October 2024 Matchday 3	BG Tampines Rovers (Singapore)	3–3	(Vietnam) Nam Dinh	Jalan Besar, Singapore
	Shah Shahiran 8'; Seia Kunori 24'; Shuya Yamashita 62'	Report	Rafaelson 32' (yellow card) 53'; Joseph Mpande 42' (yellow card) 28'; Nguyễn Tuấn Anh 77'	Stadium: Jalan Besar Stadium; Attendance: 1,017; Referee: Chen Hsin-chuan (Chinese Taipei)

6 November 2024 Matchday 4	Nam Dinh (Vietnam)	3–2	(Singapore) BG Tampines Rovers	Nam Định, Vietnam
	Caio César 57'; Joseph Mpande 80' (yellow card) 61'; Lucas Alves 90+5' (yellow card) 90+5'; Trần Văn Đạt (yellow card) 89'; Nguyễn Tuấn Anh (yellow card) 90'	Report	Amirul Adli 38'; Seia Kunori 48'; Faris Ramli (yellow card) 37'	Stadium: Thiên Trường Stadium; Attendance: 9,579; Referee: Nasrullo Kabirov (Tajikistan)

25 November 2024 Matchday 5	BG Tampines Rovers (Singapore)	1–0	(Thailand) Bangkok United	Jalan Besar, Singapore
	Seia Kunori 61'	Report	Weerathep Pomphan (yellow card) 88'	Stadium: Jalan Besar Stadium; Attendance: 1,026; Referee: Ahmed Issa (United Arab Emirates)

4 December 2024 Matchday 6	Lee Man (Hong Kong)	0–0	(Singapore) BG Tampines Rovers	Mong Kok, Hong Kong
	Everton Camargo (yellow card) 22'	Report	Irfan Najeeb (yellow card) 81'	Stadium: Mong Kok Stadium (Note: Lee Man played their home matches at Mong Kok Stadium, Hong Kong, instead of their regular home stadium Tseung Kwan O Sports Ground, Hong Kong.); Referee: Yoshimi Yamashita (Japan)

== Competition (Women's Premier League) ==
=== 2024 Women's Premier League ===
Win Draw Loss

9 March 2024 1	Hougang United FC (Singapore)	4–1	(Singapore) BG Tampines Rovers	Choa Chu Kang
	Sydney Hector 13'; Reneelyn Riddle 15'; Raudhah Kamis 17'; Nasriah Ibrahim 33'		Priscille Le Helloco 3'	Stadium: Choa Chu Kang Stadium

17 March 2024 2	BG Tampines Rovers FC (Singapore)	1–1	(Singapore) Tanjong Pagar United FC	Choa Chu Kang
	Victoria Sarka 58'		Rachel Chan 35'	Stadium: Choa Chu Kang Stadium

8 June 2024 3 (Rescheduled)	BG Tampines Rovers FC (Singapore)	7–0	(Singapore) Balestier Khalsa FC	Choa Chu Kang
				Stadium: Choa Chu Kang Stadium

25 May 2024 4 (Rescheduled)	Still Aerion WFC (Singapore)	2–2	(Singapore) BG Tampines Rovers FC	Choa Chu Kang
	Saranya 27'; S. Sunisa 32' (pen.)			Stadium: Choa Chu Kang Stadium

4 May 2024 5	Tiong Bahru FC (Singapore)	4–3	(Singapore) BG Tampines Rovers FC	Choa Chu Kang
	Nur Syakirah Jumain 25'; Helena Constantinou 50', 54', 90'	Report	Maia Mccoy 10'; Victoria Sarka 40'; Nuurfathimah Syaakirah 85'	Stadium: Choa Chu Kang Stadium

12 May 2024 6	BG Tampines Rovers FC (Singapore)	1–2	(Singapore) Geylang International FC	Choa Chu Kang
			Maeva Lazorthes Pedauga; Farah Nurzahirah	Stadium: Choa Chu Kang Stadium

18 May 2024 7	Lion City Sailors (Singapore)	9–0	(Singapore) BG Tampines Rovers FC	Choa Chu Kang
	Yuvika Suresh 6'; Josephine Ang 16', 30'; Ho Hui Xin 49'; Cara Chang 63'; Raeka Ee 69', 84'; Dorcas Chu 80' (pen.); Madison Telmer 90'			Stadium: Choa Chu Kang Stadium

23 June 2024 8	Albirex Niigata FC (S) (Singapore)	6–0	(Singapore) BG Tampines Rovers FC	Choa Chu Kang
	Huraizah Ismail 13'; Nurzaherra Maisarah 22'; Noralinda Wahab 23', 36'; Manami Fukuzawa 29'; Kana Kitahara 89'	Report		Stadium: Choa Chu Kang Stadium

29 June 2024 9	BG Tampines Rovers FC (Singapore)	1–3	(Singapore) Hougang United	Choa Chu Kang
	Nurul Ariqah 26'	Report	Siti Wan Nabilah 11'; Nur Izyani 33'; Reenelyn 47'	Stadium: Choa Chu Kang Stadium

20 July 2024 10	Tanjong Pagar United FC (Singapore)	4–0	(Singapore) BG Tampines Rovers FC	Choa Chu Kang
	Nuriah 39'; Rosairiani Suhairi 46'; Alyssa Deanna 63'; Syarah 87'			Stadium: Choa Chu Kang Stadium

3 August 2024 11	Balestier Khalsa FC (Singapore)	0–2	(Singapore) BG Tampines Rovers FC	Choa Chu Kang
			Anaya Sehgal 20'; Andrea Moska 69'	Stadium: Choa Chu Kang Stadium

11 August 2024 12	BG Tampines Rovers FC (Singapore)	0–1	(Singapore) Still Aerion WFC	Choa Chu Kang
				Stadium: Choa Chu Kang Stadium

18 August 2024 13	BG Tampines Rovers FC (Singapore)	3–0	(Singapore) Tiong Bahru FC	Choa Chu Kang
	11. Darvina; 14. Sharifah; 19. Anna Seng			Stadium: Choa Chu Kang Stadium

25 August 2024 14	Geylang International (Singapore)	5–1	(Singapore) BG Tampines Rovers FC	Jalan Besar
	Farah Nurzahirah; Nahwah Aidilreza; Siti Nurerwadah Erwan; Wan Nashirah; Shaahidah Zulkifli		14. Sharifah	Stadium: Jalan Besar Stadium

8 September 2024 15 (Rescheduled)	Albirex Niigata (S) (Japan)	8–0	(Singapore) BG Tampines Rovers FC	Singapore
	Yuki Moden 29'; Nurzaherra Maisarah 31'; Lila Tan 47'; Manami Fukuzawa 57', 90+1'; 83' (o.g.); Dhaniyah Qasimah 86'; Nurul Unaisah 89'			Stadium: ITE College East

11 September 2024 16 (Rescheduled)	BG Tampines Rovers FC (Singapore)	0–10	(Singapore) Lion City Sailors FC	Singapore
			Dorcas Chu 25'; Raeka Ee Pei Ying 31', 53'; Priscille Le Helloco 32', 56', 57'; Nur Ain Salleh 59', 84'; Sarah Zu’risqha Zul’kepli 57'; Yuvika Suresh 89'	Stadium: Jalan Besar

League table

Pos	Team	Pld	W	D	L	GF	GA	GD	Pts	Qualification or relegation
1	Lion City Sailors (C)	16	14	1	1	95	4	+91	43	Qualification for AFC Champions League
2	Albirex Niigata (S)	16	14	0	2	84	9	+75	42	
3	Geylang International	16	9	4	3	48	16	+32	31	
4	Still Aerion	16	8	4	4	38	27	+11	28	
5	Hougang United	16	8	3	5	37	22	+15	27	
6	Tanjong Pagar United	16	5	2	9	15	25	−10	17	
7	BG Tampines Rovers	16	3	2	11	22	59	−37	11	
8	Tiong Bahru	16	2	1	13	11	81	−70	7	
9	Balestier Khalsa	16	0	1	15	3	110	−107	1	

Updated to match(es) played on 15 September 2024. Source: Women's Premier League
Rules for classification: 1) points; 2) goal difference; 3) number of goals scored; 4) number of wins
(C) League champions

=== 2025 Women's Premier League ===
Win Draw Loss

2 March 2025 1	Still Aerion Women (Singapore)	2–2	(Singapore) BG Tampines Rovers	Choa Chu Kang
	Nur Iffah 21' (o.g.); Puteri Noralisa 50' (pen.)	Report	Ruby Brooks 55' (pen.), 85' (pen.)	Stadium: Choa Chu Kang Stadium

22 March 2025 2	BG Tampines Rovers (Singapore)	2–3	(Singapore) Hougang United	Choa Chu Kang
	Mio Irisawa 89'; Darvina Halini 90'		Nasriah Ibrahim 2'; Riddle Reneelyn Sison 56'; Sydney Hector 69'	Stadium: Choa Chu Kang Stadium

12 April 2025 3 (Rescheduled)	BG Tampines Rovers (Singapore)	P–P	(Singapore) Tiong Bahru FC	Choa Chu Kang
				Stadium: Choa Chu Kang Stadium

Match is postponed due to incremental weather

16 April 2025 4 (Rescheduled)	Albirex Niigata (S) (Singapore)	–	(Singapore) BG Tampines Rovers	Jalan Besar
				Stadium: Jalan Besar Stadium

Match is postponed due to rescheduled of the SG Cup match which result in the unavailability of the stadium

19 April 2025 5	BG Tampines Rovers (Singapore)	2–9	(Singapore) Lion City Sailors	Choa Chu Kang
	Anna Seng 4'; Ruby Brooks 56'	Report	Putri Alyiah Seow 22', 28', 70', 80'; Sarah Zu’risqha Zul’kepli 43', 45+1', 54'; Raeka Ee Pei Ying 66'; Anaya Sehgal 89'	Stadium: Choa Chu Kang Stadium

26 April 2025 6 (Rescheduled)	Geylang International (Singapore)	P–P	(Singapore) BG Tampines Rovers	Choa Chu Kang
				Stadium: Choa Chu Kang Stadium

Match is postponed due to the unavailability of the stadium as a result of the 2025 General Election

11 May 2025 7	Tanjong Pagar United (Singapore)	0–3	(Singapore) BG Tampines Rovers	Choa Chu Kang
			Anna Seng; Nahwah Aidilreza; Sharifah Amira	Stadium: Choa Chu Kang Stadium

17 May 2025 8	BG Tampines Rovers (Singapore)	1–4	(Singapore) Still Aerion WFC	Choa Chu Kang
	Nahwah Aidilreza			Stadium: Choa Chu Kang Stadium

25 May 2025 9	Hougang United (Singapore)	–	(Singapore) BG Tampines Rovers	Choa Chu Kang
				Stadium: Choa Chu Kang Stadium

17 August 2025 10	BG Tampines Rovers (Singapore)	–	(Singapore) Albirex Niigata (S)	Choa Chu Kang
				Stadium: Choa Chu Kang Stadium

24 August 2025 11	BG Tampines Rovers (Singapore)	–	(Singapore) Balestier Khalsa	Choa Chu Kang
				Stadium: Choa Chu Kang Stadium

31 August 2025 12	Balestier Khalsa (Singapore)	–	(Singapore) BG Tampines Rovers	Choa Chu Kang
				Stadium: Choa Chu Kang Stadium

6 September 2025 13	Tiong Bahru FC (Singapore)	–	(Singapore) BG Tampines Rovers	Choa Chu Kang
				Stadium: Choa Chu Kang Stadium

13 September 2025 14	Lion City Sailors (Singapore)	–	(Singapore) BG Tampines Rovers	Choa Chu Kang
				Stadium: Choa Chu Kang Stadium

20 September 2025 15	BG Tampines Rovers (Singapore)	v	(Singapore) Geylang International	Choa Chu Kang
				Stadium: Choa Chu Kang Stadium

4 October 2025 16	BG Tampines Rovers (Singapore)	v	(Singapore) Tanjong Pagar United	Choa Chu Kang
				Stadium: Choa Chu Kang Stadium

League table

Pos	Team	Pld	W	D	L	GF	GA	GD	Pts	Qualification or relegation
1	Albirex Niigata (S) (C)	16	15	0	1	91	6	+85	45	Qualification for AFC Champions League
2	Still Aerion	16	12	2	2	57	21	+36	38	
3	Lion City Sailors	16	11	3	2	76	10	+66	36	
4	Geylang International	16	9	2	5	40	23	+17	29	
5	Hougang United	16	6	2	8	17	28	−11	20	
6	Tanjong Pagar United	16	4	0	12	11	43	−32	12	
7	Tiong Bahru	16	4	0	12	13	47	−34	12	
8	BG Tampines Rovers	16	3	2	11	17	57	−40	11	
9	Balestier Khalsa	16	2	1	13	11	98	−87	7	

Updated to match(es) played on 12 Oct 2025. Source: Women's Premier League
Rules for classification: 1) points; 2) goal difference; 3) number of goals scored; 4) number of wins
(C) League champions
