= 2024 Lion City Sailors Women season =

Lion City Sailors
2024 season
- Owner: Garena
- Chairman: Forrest Li
- Head coach: Muhammad Yusuf Chatyawan
- Premier League: 1st
- Champions League: Preliminary
- National League: Champions (Mattar Sailors)
- Top goalscorer: Raeka Ee (18 goals)
Home colours	Away colours	Third colours

The 2024 season marked the Lion City Sailors Women's third consecutive season in the top flight of Singapore football and in the Women's Premier League. They were led by Muhammad Yusuf Chatyawan, a former Indonesia International, who had previously managed the Indonesia national team.

== Review ==
Daniel Ong took over from previous head coash Yeong Sheau Shyan.

== Kits ==
Kits using Puma's trademark
Home	Away	Goalkeeper Home ^{1}	Goalkeeper Away ^{2}

== Coaching staff ==
The following list displays the coaching staff of all the Lion City Sailors current football sections:

First Team

Position	Name
Chairman	(Singapore) (China) Forrest Li
CEO	(Singapore)
General Manager	(Singapore) Badri Ghent
Team Manager (SPL)	(Vietnam) Hương Trần
Team Manager (WPL)	(Singapore) Jenny Tan
Technical Director	(Serbia) Luka Lalić
Head Coach	(Serbia) Aleksandar Ranković
Head Coach (Women)	(Singapore) Stephen Ng
Assistant Head Coach (Women)	(Singapore)
Assistant Coach	(Serbia) Marko Perović
Goalkeeping Coach	(Slovenia) Kris Stergulc
Goalkeeping Coach (Assistant)	(Singapore) Chua Lye Heng
Goalkeeping Coach (Women)	(Singapore) Daniel Ong
Conditioning Coach	(Bosnia and Herzegovina) Dzevad Saric
Head of Performance	(Netherlands) Mark Onderwater
Head of Rehabilitation	(Netherlands) Mike Kerklaan
Head of Technical Training	(Portugal) Rodrigo Costa
Head of Video Analyst	(Spain) Pablo Muñiz
Video Analyst	(Singapore) Nigel Goh
Physiologist	(Netherlands) Niels Van Sundert (Spain) David Conde
Head of Logistics	(Singapore) Zahir Taufeek

Academy

Position	Name
Technical Director	(Serbia) Luka Lalić
General Manager	(Singapore) Tan Li Yu
Team Manager (WPL)	(Singapore) Jenny Tan
Head Coach (SFL)	(Singapore)
Goalkeeper Coach (Under-21)	(Singapore)
Goalkeeping Coach (Development)	(Slovenia) Matija Radikon
Goalkeeping Coach (Foundation)	(Singapore) Shahril Jantan
Strength & Conditioning Coach (Academy)	(Singapore) Chloe Alphonso (Singapore) Derrick Ang
Performance Coordinator (Academy)	(Germany) Lewin Kösterke
Medical Coordinator (Academy)	(Netherlands) Wouter de Vroome
Physiologist (Academy)	(Spain) Santiago Izquierdo Monllor
Head of Youth Team (Development) & Under-21 Coach	(Netherlands) Daan van Oudheusden
Head of Youth Team (Foundation)	(Singapore) Tengku Mushadad
Under-17 Head Coach	(Spain) José Mataix
Under-15 Head Coach	(Netherlands) Lucas Ekers
Under-13 Head Coach	(Singapore) Ashraf Ariffin
Under-12 Head Coach	(Singapore) Kevin Tan
Under-11 Head Coach	(Portugal) Francisco Couto
Under-10 Head Coach	
Technical Coach (Development)	(Portugal) Nuno Pereira
Technical Coach (Foundation)	(Portugal) Diogo Costa
Video Analyst (Academy)	(Spain) Pol Corpas Cuatrecasas (Singapore) Poh Kai Ern (Singapore) Shaun Tan
Data Analyst (Academy)	(Singapore) Gautam Selvamany
Medical Logistics	(Singapore) Masrezal Bin Mashuri
Nutritionist	(Netherlands) Denise Van Ewijk

== Squad ==
=== Women squad (LCS) ===
Squad No.	Name	Nationality	Date of Birth (Age)	Previous Club	Contract Since	Contract End
Goalkeeper
1	Izairida Shakira	(Singapore)	2 June 2007 (age 19)	(Singapore) Mattar Sailors (W)	2024	2024
22	Beatrice Tan Li Bin	(Singapore)	29 June 1992 (age 34)	(Singapore) Tanjong Pagar United (W)	2022	2024
Defender
4	Umairah Hamdan	(Singapore)	11 March 2002 (age 24)	(Singapore) South Avenue CSC	2022	2024
6	Seri Nurinsyirah	(Singapore)	29 January 2009 (age 17)	(Singapore) Mattar Sailors (W)	2023	2024
8	Syazwani Ruzi	(Singapore)	6 March 2001 (age 25)	(Singapore) Still Aerion	2022	2024
17	Khairunnisa Anwar	(Singapore)	21 February 2003 (age 23)	(Singapore) South Avenue CSC	2022	2024
24	Nurhidayu Naszri	(Singapore)	16 March 2004 (age 22)	(Singapore) JSSL Tampines	2024	2024
25	Sara Hayduchok	(Philippines) (United States)	26 May 1995 (age 31)	(Singapore) JSSL Tampines	2023	2024
27	Tia Foong Po Shiun	(Singapore)	31 July 2007 (age 19)	(Singapore) Mattar Sailors (W)	2022	2024
76	Tyan Foong	(Singapore)	19 April 2009 (age 17)	(Singapore) Mattar Sailors (W)	2024	2024
Midfielder
2	Madison Josephine Telmer	(Canada)	29 October 2004 (age 21)	(Canada) University of the Fraser Valley	2022	2024
7	Cara Ming-Yan Chang	(Singapore)	28 November 2008 (age 17)	(Singapore) Mattar Sailors (W)	2022	2024
13	Seri Ayu Natasha Naszri	(Singapore)	19 December 2007 (age 18)	(Spain) ESC La Liga Academy	2024	2024
15	Qarissa Putri Ramadhani	(Singapore)	24 September 2008 (age 18)	(Singapore) Tanjong Pagar United (W)	2024	2024
16	Ho Huixin	(Singapore)	23 April 1992 (age 34)	(Singapore) Home United (W)	2022	2024
23	Sarah Zu’risqha Zul’kepli	(Singapore)	24 July 2006 (age 20)	(Japan) Albirex Niigata (S)	2024	2024
32	Nur Ain Salleh	(Singapore)	7 January 2010 (age 16)	(Singapore) Lion City Sailors U13	2024	2024
69	Natasha Kaur	(Singapore)		(Singapore) Mattar Sailors (W)	2023	2024
Forwards
5	Miray Hokotate Altun	(Japan)	6 April 2005 (age 21)	ANZA Singapore	2022	2024
9	Raeka Ee Pei Ying	(Singapore)	16 September 2003 (age 23)	(Singapore) Mattar Sailors (W)	2023	2024
10	Priscille Le Helloco	(France)	8 January 2007 (age 19)	(Singapore) JSSL Tampines	2024	2024
11	Liyana Indah Rickit	(Singapore)	14 October 2009 (age 16)	(Singapore) Mattar Sailors (W)	2022	2024
12	Josephine Ang Kaile	(Singapore)	26 September 2006 (age 20)	(Singapore) Mattar Sailors (W)	2022	2024
19	Yuvika Suresh	(Singapore)	1 March 2009 (age 17)	(Singapore) Mattar Sailors (W)	2022	2024
20	Dorcas Chu	(Singapore)	29 July 2002 (age 24)	(Singapore) Mattar Sailors (W)	2022	2024
Mid-season transferred players
3	Fatin Aqillah	(Singapore)	11 June 1994 (age 32)	(Singapore) Tanjong Pagar United (W)	2022	2024
14	Nadia Nuraffendi	(Singapore)	14 April 2006 (age 20)	(Singapore) Mattar Sailors (W)	2023	2024
30	Laura Gänser	(Germany)		(Germany) 1. FC Mühlhausen	2024	2024

=== Women squad (Mattar Sailors) ===
Squad No.	Name	Nationality	Date of Birth (Age)	Previous Club	Contract Since	Contract End
Goalkeeper
1	Chantale Lamasan Rosa	(Singapore)	2009	Singapore Sports School	2023	2024
16	Talia	(Singapore)		Youth Team	2024	2024
Defender
2	Rayna Balqis	(Singapore)		(Singapore) JSSL (W)	2024	2024
3	Fatin Aqillah	(Singapore)	11 June 1994 (age 32)	(Singapore) Lion City Sailors (W)	2022	2024
5	Lopez	(Singapore)		Youth Team	2024	2024
19	Tyan Foong	(Singapore)	19 April 2009 (age 17)	(Singapore) Lion City Sailors (W)	2024	2024
21	Syaizta Ohorella	(Singapore)	2009	(Singapore)	2023	2024
22	Tasha Foong Po Yui	(Singapore)	27 May 2005 (age 21)	(Singapore) ITE College East	2022	2024
27	Milan	(Singapore)		(Singapore)	2024	2024
	Aryana	(Singapore)		(Singapore)	2024	2024
Midfielder
4	Amelia Tan Si Leng	(Singapore)	2011	Youth Team	2024	2024
10	Verona Lim Ruo Ya	(Singapore)		Youth Team	2024	2024
11	Jaen Lee	(Singapore)		(Singapore)	2023	2024
17	Carol	(Singapore)		Youth Team	2024	2024
20	Seri Ayu Natasha Naszri	(Singapore)	19 December 2007 (age 18)	(Singapore) Lion City Sailors (W)	2024	2024
24	Mayvin Chan	(Singapore) (Vietnam)		(Singapore) JSSL Tampines Rovers	2024	2024
25	Gerry	(Singapore)		Youth Team	2024	2024
Forward
6	Putri Alyiah Seow	(Malaysia)		(Singapore)	2024	2024
7	Nor Adriana Lim	(Singapore)	2009	(Singapore)	2023	2024
8	Celine Koh	(Singapore)	2009	Youth Team	2022	2024
9	Liyana Indah Rickit	(Singapore)	14 October 2009 (age 16)	(Singapore) Lion City Sailors (W)	2022	2024
12	Amelia Ng Jing Xuan	(Singapore)		Youth Team	2024	2024
15	Maxine Maribbay	(Singapore)	21 April 2005 (age 21)		2023	2024
	Katelyn Yeoh	(Singapore)		(Singapore)	2023	2024
	Nur Risya Rizqyqa	(Singapore)		Youth Team	2024	2024

== Coaching staff ==
The following list displays the coaching staff of all the Lion City Sailors current football sections:

First Team

Position	Name
Chairman	(Singapore) (China) Forrest Li
CEO	(Singapore)
General Manager	(Singapore) Badri Ghent
Team Manager (SPL)	(Vietnam) Hương Trần
Team Manager (WPL)	(Singapore) Jenny Tan
Technical Director	(Serbia) Luka Lalić
Head Coach	(Serbia) Aleksandar Ranković
Head Coach (Women)	(Indonesia) Muhammad Yusuf Chatyawan
Assistant Head Coach (Women)	(Singapore) Yeong Sheau Shyan
Assistant Coach	(Serbia) Marko Perović
Goalkeeping Coach	(Slovenia) Kris Stergulc
Goalkeeping Coach (Assistant)	(Singapore) Chua Lye Heng
Goalkeeping Coach (Women)	(Singapore) Daniel Ong
Conditioning Coach	(Bosnia and Herzegovina) Dzevad Saric
Head of Performance	(Netherlands) Mark Onderwater
Head of Rehabilitation	(Netherlands) Mike Kerklaan
Head of Technical Training	(Portugal) Rodrigo Costa
Head of Video Analyst	(Spain) Pablo Muñiz
Video Analyst	(Singapore) Nigel Goh
Video Analyst	(Indonesia) Muhammad Yusuf Chatyawan
Physiologist	(Netherlands) Niels Van Sundert (Spain) David Conde
Head of Logistics	(Singapore) Zahir Taufeek

Academy

Position	Name
Technical Director	(Serbia) Luka Lalić
General Manager	(Singapore) Tan Li Yu
Team Manager (WPL)	(Singapore) Jenny Tan
Head Coach (SFL)	(Singapore)
Head Coach (WNL)	(Singapore) Ikhwan Risydah
Goalkeeper Coach (Under-21)	(Singapore)
Goalkeeping Coach (Development)	(Slovenia) Matija Radikon
Goalkeeping Coach (Foundation)	(Singapore) Shahril Jantan
Strength & Conditioning Coach (Academy)	(Singapore) Chloe Alphonso (Singapore) Derrick Ang
Performance Coordinator (Academy)	(Germany) Lewin Kösterke
Medical Coordinator (Academy)	(Netherlands) Wouter de Vroome
Physiologist (Academy)	(Spain) Santiago Izquierdo Monllor
Head of Youth Team (Development) & Under-21 Coach	(Netherlands) Daan van Oudheusden
Head of Youth Team (Foundation)	(Singapore) Tengku Mushadad
Under-17 Head Coach	(Spain) José Mataix
Under-15 Head Coach	(Netherlands) Lucas Ekers
Under-13 Head Coach	(Singapore) Ashraf Ariffin
Under-12 Head Coach	(Singapore) Kevin Tan
Under-11 Head Coach	(Portugal) Francisco Couto
Under-10 Head Coach	
Technical Coach (Development)	(Portugal) Nuno Pereira
Technical Coach (Foundation)	(Portugal) Diogo Costa
Video Analyst (Academy)	(Spain) Pol Corpas Cuatrecasas (Singapore) Poh Kai Ern (Singapore) Shaun Tan
Data Analyst (Academy)	(Singapore) Gautam Selvamany
Medical Logistics	(Singapore) Masrezal Bin Mashuri
Nutritionist	(Netherlands) Denise Van Ewijk

== Transfers ==
=== In ===
Pre-season

Position	Player	Transferred from	Team	Ref
GK	(Singapore) Izairida Shakira	(Singapore) Mattar Sailors (W)	Women	Promoted
DF	(Singapore) Tyan Foong	(Singapore) Mattar Sailors (W)	Women	Promoted
DF	(Singapore) Seri Nurinsyirah	(Singapore) Mattar Sailors (W)	Women	Promoted
MF	(Singapore) Sarah Zu’risqha Zul’kepli	(Japan) Albirex Niigata (S) (W)	Women	Free
MF	(Singapore) Qarissa Putri Ramadhani	(Singapore) Tanjong Pagar United (W)	Women	Free
MF	(Canada) Madison Josephine Telmer	N.A.	Women	Free
MF	(Singapore) Nadia Nuraffendi	(Singapore) Mattar Sailors (W)	Women	Promoted
MF	(Singapore) Liyana Rickit	(Singapore) Mattar Sailors (W)	Women	Promoted (Note: Liyana Rickit played for LCS Women Team in Women Premier League before joining sister club, Mattar City Sailors (W) in the Women National League)
MF	(Singapore) Yuvika Suresh	(Singapore) Mattar Sailors (W)	Women	Promoted
MF	(Singapore) Natasha Kaur	(Singapore) Mattar Sailors (W)	Women	Promoted
MF	(Germany) Laura Gänser	(Germany) 1. FC Mühlhausen	Women	Free
FW	(Singapore) Raeka Ee	(Singapore) Mattar Sailors (W)	Women	Promoted
FW	(Singapore) Dorcas Chu	(Singapore) Mattar Sailors (W)	Women	Promoted

Mid-season

Position	Player	Transferred from	Team	Ref
MF	(France) Priscille Le Helloco	(Singapore) JSSL Tampines	Women	Free
MF	(Singapore) Nurhidayu Naszri	(Singapore) JSSL Tampines	Women	Free
DF	(Singapore) Nur Ain Salleh	(Singapore) Lion City Sailors U13	Women	Promoted
MF	(Singapore) Mayvin	(Singapore) JSSL Tampines	Mattar Sailors (W)	Free

=== Out ===
Preseason

Position	Player	Transferred To	Team	Ref
GK	(Singapore) Noor Kusumawati	Retired	Women	Free
DF	(Singapore) Munirah Mohamad	(Singapore)	Women	Free
DF	(Singapore) Ernie Sulastri Sontaril	(Japan) Albirex Niigata (S) (W)	Women	Free
MF	(Singapore) Venetia Lim	(Australia) Boroondara Eagles Women (A2)	Women	Free
MF	(Singapore) Madelin Sophie Lock	Retired	Women	Free
MF	(Germany) Julia-Vanessa Farr	Retired	Women	Free
MF	(Philippines) Nica Siy	Retired	Women	Free
FW	(Singapore) (France) Lila Tan Hui Ying	(Japan) Albirex Niigata (S) (W)	Women	Free
FW	(Singapore) Nur Izzati Rosni	(Japan) Albirex Niigata (S) (W)	Women	Free

Mid-season

Position	Player	Transferred To	Team	Ref
GK	(Singapore) Nurul Illyanis		Mattar Sailors (W)	Free
DF	(Singapore) Fatin Aqillah	(Singapore) Mattar Sailors (W)	Women	Free
DF	(Singapore) Nadia Nuraffendi	(Singapore)	Women	Free
DF	(Singapore) Sara Merican	(England) Wigan Athletic FC (W)	Mattar Sailors (W)	Free
DF	(Singapore) Siti Nur Hidayah		Mattar Sailors (W)	Free
DF	(Singapore) Isis Ang		Mattar Sailors (W)	Free
MF	(Canada) Madison Josephine Telmer	N.A.	Women	Free
MF	(Germany) Laura Gänser	(Germany) 1. FC Mühlhausen	Women	Free
FW	(Singapore) Miray Hokotate Altun	N.A. (Further Study)	Women	Free
MF	(Singapore) Anusha Saluja		Mattar Sailors (W)	Free
MF	(Singapore) Ruby Tjipto		Mattar Sailors (W)	Free
FW	(Singapore) Elena Khoo		Mattar Sailors (W)	Free
FW	(Singapore) Syafina Putri Rashid		Mattar Sailors (W)	Free
FW	(Singapore) Naureen Qadriyah		Mattar Sailors (W)	Free

=== Loans In ===
Mid-Season

Position	Player	Transferred From	Team	Ref
MF	(Singapore) Seri Ayu Natasha Naszri	(Spain) ESC La Liga Academy	First Team	Season Loan (Note: Natasha Naszri played for LCS Women Team in Women Premier League before joining sister team, Mattar City Sailors (W) in the Women National League)

== Friendlies ==
=== Pre-season friendlies ===
Win Draw Loss

12 January 2024 CF Charity Cup	Lion City Sailors (Singapore)	4–2	(Singapore) Royal Arion	Tampines
	Qarissa Putri 37'; Nur Sarah Zu’risqha 42'; Nur Izzati Rosni (pen.); Sara Hayduchok 86'	Report	Pikul Khueanpet 75'; Orapin Waenngoen	Stadium: Our Tampines Hub

=== Mid-season friendlies ===
Win Draw Loss

9 August 2024 Friendly	Lion City Sailors (Singapore)	v	(Thailand) Bangkok WFC	Bangkok
		Report

== Team statistics ==
=== Appearances and goals (Women) ===
As of 15 Sept 2024

No.	Pos.	Player	WPL		AFC Champions League		Total	
No.	Pos.	Player	Apps.	Goals	Apps.	Goals	Apps.	Goals
1	GK	(Singapore) Izairida Shakira	7+1	0	0	0	8	0
4	DF	(Singapore) Nur Umairah	14	4	2	0	16	4
5	FW	(Japan) Miray Altun	8+1	2	1+1	0	10	2
6	DF	(Singapore) Seri Nurinsyirah	6+2	2	0+1	0	9	2
7	MF	(Singapore) Cara Ming-Yan Chang	0+4	3	1	0	5	3
8	DF	(Singapore) Nur Syazwani Ruzi	16	6	2	0	18	6
9	FW	(Singapore) Raeka Ee Pei Ying	14+1	18	2	1	17	19
10	FW	(France) Priscille Le Helloco	4+1	5	1+1	0	7	5
11	MF	(Singapore) Liyana Indah Rickit	4+4	2	0	0	8	2
12	FW	(Singapore) Josephine Ang Kaile	2+7	12	0+2	0	11	12
13	DF	(Singapore) Seri Ayu Natasha Naszri	3	0	0+1	0	3	0
15	MF	(Singapore) Qarissa Putri Ramadhani	11+1	0	2	0	14	0
16	MF	(Singapore) Ho Hui Xin	11+1	1	0+1	0	13	1
17	DF	(Singapore) Khairunnisa Anwar	8+3	1	2	0	13	1
18	MF	(Singapore) Munirah Mohamad	0	0	0	0	0	0
19	MF	(Singapore) Yuvika Suresh	5+1	3	0+1	0	7	3
20	FW	(Singapore) Dorcas Chu	10+2	5	2	0	13	5
22	GK	(Singapore) Beatrice Tan	9	0	2	0	11	0
23	MF	(Singapore) Sarah Zu’risqha Zul’kepli	12+1	12	2	0	15	12
24	MF	(Singapore) Nurhidayu Naszri	5+3	1	1	0	7	1
25	DF	(Philippines) (United States) Sara Hayduchok	9+1	2	0+1	0	11	2
27	DF	(Singapore) Tia Foong Po Shiun	1+1	0	0	0	2	0
32	MF	(Singapore) Nur Ain Salleh	3+3	6	2	0	5	6
69	MF	(Singapore) Natasha Kaur	1+1	0	0	0	2	0
76	DF	(Singapore) Tyan Foong	3+2	0	0	0	5	0
Players who have played this season but had left the club or on loan to other club
2	MF	(Canada) Madison Josephine Telmer	9	8	0	0	9	8
3	DF	(Singapore) Fatin Aqillah	0	0	0	0	0	0
14	MF	(Singapore) Nadia Nuraffendi	0+1	0	0	0	1	0
30	MF	(Germany) Laura Gänser	1+4	0	0	0	5	0

=== Appearances and goals (Mattar Sailors) ===
As of 13 Oct 2023

No.	Pos.	Player	WNL	
No.	Pos.	Player	Apps.	Goals
1	GK	(Singapore) Chantale Lamasan Rosa	4	0
2	DF	(Singapore) Rayna Balqis	3	2
3	DF	(Singapore) Fatin Aqillah	2	0
5	DF	(Singapore) Lopez	1	0
6	DF	(Singapore) Putri Alyiah Seow	3	3
7	FW	(Singapore) Nor Adriana Lim	4	7
8	FW	(Singapore) Celine Koh	3	1
9	FW	(Singapore) Liyana Indah Rickit	3+1	4
10	MF	(Singapore) Verona Lim Ruo Ya	2+1	1
11	MF	(Singapore) Jaen Lee	1+2	2
12	MF	(Singapore) Amelia Ng Jing Xuan	1	0
15	FW	(Singapore) Maxine Maribbay	2	0
17	MF	(Singapore) Carol	1	0
19	DF	(Singapore) Tyan Foong	1	0
20	MF	(Singapore) Seri Ayu Natasha Naszri	3	1
21	DF	(Singapore) Syaizta Ohorella	2	0
22	DF	(Singapore) Tasha Foong Po Yui	3	0
24	MF	(Singapore) Mayvin Chan	2	3
25	DF	(Singapore) Gerry	1	0
27	DF	(Singapore) Milan	1	0
?	FW	(Singapore) Katelyn Yeoh	0	0
?	GK	(Singapore) Talia	0	0
Players who have played this season but had left the club or on loan to other club

== Competition ==
=== Women's Premier League ===
Win Draw Loss

9 March 2024 1	Lion City Sailors (Singapore)	5–0	(Singapore) Tiong Bahru FC	Choa Chu Kang
	Raeka Ee Pei Ying 10', 63'; Madison Josephine Telmer 13'; Syazwani Ruzi 25'; Seri Nurinsyirah 25'	Report		Stadium: Choa Chu Kang Stadium

24 March 2024 2	Lion City Sailors (Singapore)	2–1	(Japan) Albirex Niigata (S)	Jalan Besar
	Raeka Ee Pei Ying 29', 48'	Report	Mulan Ayliffe 87'	Stadium: Jalan Besar Stadium

14 April 2024 3	Lion City Sailors (Singapore)	4–0	(Singapore) Hougang United	Yishun
	Raeka Ee Pei Ying 20'; Nur Izyani 39' (o.g.); Sara Hayduchok 48'; Josephine Ang Kaile 88'	Report		Stadium: Yishun Stadium

20 April 2024 4	Lion City Sailors (Singapore)	3–0	(Singapore) Tanjong Pagar United	Choa Chu Kang
	Sara Hayduchok 51'; Madison Josephine Telmer 63'; Cara Chang 90'	Report		Stadium: Choa Chu Kang Stadium

4 May 2024 5	Lion City Sailors (Singapore)	18–0	(Singapore) Balestier Khalsa	Choa Chu Kang
	Nur Syazwani Ruzi 4', 13', 17'; Sarah Zu’risqha Zul’kepli 8', 54', 62'; Raeka Ee Pei Ying 28', 44', 55'; Madison Josephine Telmer 29', 63'; Dorcas Chu 31', 51'; Liyana Indah Rickit 74'; Josephine Ang Kaile 79', 80', 84'; Khairunnisa Anwar 82'	Report		Stadium: Choa Chu Kang Stadium

11 May 2024 6	Lion City Sailors (Singapore)	4–0	(Singapore) Still Aerion WFC	Choa Chu Kang
	Raeka Ee Pei Ying 13'; Syazwani Ruzi 36' (pen.); Nur Umairah 48', 61'	Report		Stadium: Choa Chu Kang Stadium

18 May 2024 7	Lion City Sailors (Singapore)	9–0	(Singapore) JSSL Tampines	Choa Chu Kang
	Yuvika Suresh 6'; Josephine Ang Kaile 16', 30'; Ho Hui Xin 49'; Cara Ming-Yan Chang 63'; Raeka Ee Pei Ying 69', 84'; Dorcas Chu 80' (pen.); Madison Josephine Telmer 90'	Report		Stadium: Choa Chu Kang Stadium

23 June 2024 8	Lion City Sailors (Singapore)	1–2	(Singapore) Geylang International	Choa Chu Kang
	Madison Josephine Telmer 86'	Report	Victoria Sarka 70', 72'	Stadium: Choa Chu Kang Stadium

29 June 2024 9	Lion City Sailors (Singapore)	13–0	(Singapore) Tiong Bahru FC	Choa Chu Kang
	Nur Ain Salleh 6'; Raeka Ee Pei Ying 18'; Sarah Zu’risqha Zul’kepli 20', 26', 32', 45', 46'; Dorcas Chu 25'; Josephine Ang Kaile 50', 58', 66'; Nur Umairah 86'; Cara Ming-Yan Chang 90+1'			Stadium: Choa Chu Kang Stadium

21 July 2024 10	Lion City Sailors (Singapore)	3–1	(Japan) Albirex Niigata (S)	Simei
	Nur Ain Salleh 32', 58'; Josephine Ang Kaile 52'; 56'		Dhaniyah Qasimah 25'	Stadium: ITE College East

27 July 2024 11 (Rescheduled)	Lion City Sailors (Singapore)	3–0	(Singapore) Hougang United	Simei
	Nur Syazwani Ruzi 68'; Madison Josephine Telmer 88'; Madison Josephine Telmer 90+3'			Stadium: ITE College East

4 August 2024 12	Lion City Sailors (Singapore)	3–0	(Singapore) Tanjong Pagar United	Simei
	Priscille Le Helloco 24', 55'; Josephine Ang Kaile 90+3'			Stadium: ITE College East

17 August 2024 13	Lion City Sailors (Singapore)	11–0	(Singapore) Balestier Khalsa	Choa Chu Kang
	Syazwani Ruzi 5'; Liyana Indah Rickit 12'; Sarah Zu’risqha Zul’kepli 16', 32', 45', 46'; Josephine Ang Kaile 33'; Seri Nurinsyirah 37'; Miray Hokotate Altun 49', 80'; Raeka Ee Pei Ying 62', 65'; Nur Umairah 90+1'; Cara Ming-Yan Chang 90+2'			Stadium: Choa Chu Kang Stadium

15 September 2024 14 (Rescheduled)	Lion City Sailors (Singapore)	6–0	(Singapore) Still Aerion WFC	Jalan Besar
	Raeka Ee Pei Ying 5', 31'; Sarah Zu’risqha Zul’kepli 60', 82'; Nurhidayu Naszri 75'; Nur Ain Salleh 90'			Stadium: Jalan Besar Stadium

11 September 2024 15 (Rescheduled)	Lion City Sailors (Singapore)	10–0	(Singapore) JSSL Tampines	Jalan Besar
	Dorcas Chu 25'; Raeka Ee Pei Ying 31', 53'; Priscille Le Helloco 32', 56', 57'; Nur Ain Salleh 59', 84'; Sarah Zu’risqha Zul’kepli 57'; Yuvika Suresh 89'			Stadium: Jalan Besar Stadium

8 September 2024 16	Lion City Sailors (Singapore)	0–0	(Singapore) Geylang International	Simei
	Nurhidayu Naszri (penalty missed) 38			Stadium: ITE College East

League table

Pos	Team	Pld	W	D	L	GF	GA	GD	Pts	Qualification or relegation
1	Lion City Sailors (C)	16	14	1	1	95	4	+91	43	League champions
2	(Japan) Albirex Niigata (S)	16	14	0	2	84	9	+75	42	
3	Geylang International	16	9	4	3	48	16	+32	31	
4	Still Aerion	16	8	4	4	38	27	+11	28	
5	Hougang United	16	8	3	5	37	22	+15	27	
6	Tanjong Pagar United	16	5	2	9	15	25	−10	17	
7	JSSL Tampines	16	3	2	11	22	59	−37	11	
8	Tiong Bahru	16	2	1	13	11	81	−70	7	
9	Balestier Khalsa	16	0	1	15	3	110	−107	1	

Updated to match(es) played on 1 October 2022. Source: FAS
(C) Champions

=== AFC Women's Champions League ===
==== Qualifying Round ====
25 August 2024 Preliminary Stage Grp Match 1	Odisha (India)	4–1	(Singapore) Lion City Sailors	Zarqa, Jordan
	D. Chu 20' (o.g.); Kom 54', 57'; Ruzi 88' (o.g.)	Report	R. Ee 43'	Stadium: Prince Mohammed Stadium; Attendance: 50; Referee: Park Se-jin (South Korea)

28 August 2024 Preliminary Stage Grp Match 2	Lion City Sailors (Singapore)	0–5	(Jordan) Etihad Club	Zarqa, Jordan
		Report	Jbarah 29', 35', 57', 59'; Fraij 45+2'	Stadium: Prince Mohammed Stadium; Attendance: 110; Referee: Plong Pich Akara (Cambodia)

Pos	Team	Pld	W	D	L	GF	GA	GD	Pts	Qualification
1	(India) Odisha (A)	2	2	0	0	6	2	+4	6	Advance to group stage
2	(Jordan) Etihad (H)	2	1	0	1	6	2	+4	3	
3	(Singapore) Lion City Sailors (E)	2	0	0	2	1	9	−8	0	

Updated to match(es) played on 28 August 2024. Source: AFC
Rules for classification: Tiebreakers
(A) Advance to a further round; (E) Eliminated; (H) Hosts

== Competition (Women's National League) ==
(Played under name of Mattar Sailors Women)

Win Draw Loss

=== Round Robin ===
21 September 2024 1	Mattar Sailors (Singapore)	10–1	(Singapore) Kaki Bukit SC	Choa Chu Kang
	Mayvin Chan; Liyana Indah Rickit; Adriana Lim; Maxine Maribbay; Jaen Lee; Rayna Balqis; Seri Ayu Natasha Naszri			Stadium: Choa Chu Kang Stadium

28 September 2024 2	Mattar Sailors (Singapore)	4–0	Singapore Khalsa Association	Choa Chu Kang
	Adriana Lim; Liyana Indah Rickit; Alyiah			Stadium: Choa Chu Kang Stadium

5 October 2024 3	Mattar Sailors (Singapore)	1–2	(Singapore) Royal Arion WFC	Choa Chu Kang
	Rayna Balqis			Stadium: Choa Chu Kang Stadium

13 October 2024 4	Mattar Sailors (Singapore)	10–0	(Singapore) Ayer Rajah Gryphons FC	Choa Chu Kang
	Adriana Lim; Alyiah; Liyana Indah Rickit; Jaen Lee; Verona Lim; Celine Koh; Mayvin Chan			Stadium: Choa Chu Kang Stadium

27 October 2024 5	Mattar Sailors (Singapore)	1–1	(Singapore) Eastern Thunder FC	Choa Chu Kang
	Adriana Lim			Stadium: Choa Chu Kang Stadium

2 November 2024 6	Mattar Sailors (Singapore)	8–2	(Singapore) Winchester Isla FC	Choa Chu Kang
	Adriana Lim; Alyiah; Maxine Maribbay; Qyqa			Stadium: Choa Chu Kang Stadium

League table

Pos	Team	Pld	W	D	L	GF	GA	GD	Pts
1	Royal Arion	6	5	1	0	8	7	+1	16
2	Mattar Sailors	6	4	1	1	34	6	+28	13
3	Winchester Isla	6	3	2	1	14	14	0	11
4	Eastern Thunder FC	6	3	1	2	23	8	+15	10
5	Singapore Khalsa	6	1	2	3	5	14	−9	5
6	Kaki Bukit SC	6	1	1	4	6	26	−20	4
7	Ayer Rajah Gryphons	6	0	0	6	2	25	−23	0

Updated to match(es) played on 1 October 2022. Source: FAS

=== Semi Final ===
9 November 2024 Semi Final Leg 1	Mattar Sailors (Singapore)	3–1	(Singapore) Winchester Isla FC	Choa Chu Kang
	Adriana; Maxine			Stadium: Choa Chu Kang Stadium

16 November 2024 Semi Final Leg 2	Mattar Sailors (Singapore)	3–0 (6–1 agg.)	(Singapore) Winchester Isla FC	Choa Chu Kang
	Adriana; Liyana; Alyiah			Stadium: Choa Chu Kang Stadium

=== Final ===
23 November 2024 Final Leg	Mattar Sailors (Singapore)	2–1	(Singapore) Eastern Thunder FC	Choa Chu Kang
				Stadium: Choa Chu Kang Stadium
