= 2024–25 Tanjong Pagar United FC season =

Tanjong Pagar United
2024–25 season
- Chairman: (Singapore) Raymond Tang
- Coach: (Singapore) Noh Alam Shah (Interim, From 2 Dec 2024) (Singapore) Hyrizan Jufri (Till 31 Nov 2024) (Singapore) Hasrin Jailani (Till 31 August 2024)
- Ground: Jurong East Stadium
- S.League: TBD
- Singapore Cup: TBD
- Top goalscorer: League: TBD; All: TBD
- Highest home attendance: TBD
- Lowest home attendance: TBD
- Average home league attendance: TBD
Home colours	Away colours

The 2024–25 season was Tanjong Pagar United's 19th season at the top level of Singapore football. It was their fifth consecutive season in the Singapore Premier League. The club also competed in the Singapore Cup.

== Season review ==
=== Pre-season ===
The 2024–25 Singapore Premier League season will be the first season to be played having a two-year schedule where Tanjong Pagar United participated in the 2024 interim pre-season tournament from 25 February until 19 April. The interim pre-season tournament ensure that the players are adequately prepared for an extended new season that will span nearly 12 months. Tanjong Pagar United than play against Malaysia Premier League club, Johor Darul Ta'zim II on 31 March 2024 at the Pasir Gudang Stadium in a move to improve Tanjong Pagar United which is mostly compromise of young players.

Tanjong United Pagar than fly off to Yogyakarta on 29 April in their 'Tour of Indonesia' pre-season friendlies and training where the club will participate in team bonding activities and as well play a series of friendly matches against quality local opposition. The club will faced off against Liga 2 club, PSIM Yogyakarta.

=== Transfers ===
Following the departure of key players like Tajeli Selamat, Naqiuddin Eunos, Shakir Hamzah, Pedro Dias, Blake Ricciuto and Mirko Šugić and Khairul Amri announced his retirement after the 2024 season concluded, the club than sign both France national Pathy Malumandsoko and Salif Cissé, Uzbekistan national Timur Talipov and Timor-Leste wonderkid, Zenivio making him the first Timor-Leste player to play in the league. Tanjong Pagar United also signed Japanese Tomoki Wada.

== Squad ==
=== Singapore Premier League ===
As of 1 May 2024

No.	Name	Nationality	Date of birth (age)	Last club	Contract Since	Contract end
Goalkeepers
1	Prathip Ekamparam	(Singapore)	21 August 2001 (age 25)	(Singapore) Young Lions	2024	2025
23	Matt Silva	(Canada) (Portugal)	28 March 1991 (age 35)	(Philippines) Loyola (P1)	2025	2025
28	Kimura Riki	(Singapore) (Japan)	14 November 2000 (age 25)	(Singapore) Police SA	2024	2025
Defenders
2	Farid Jafri	(Singapore)	5 January 2004 (age 22)	(Singapore) Tanjong Pagar United U21	2023	2025
3	Shahrin Saberin	(Singapore)	14 February 1995 (age 31)	(Singapore) Geylang International	2021	2025
5	Syed Akmal	(Singapore)	28 April 2000 (age 26)	(Singapore) Young Lions	2023	2025
15	Faizal Roslan	(Singapore)	30 May 1995 (age 31)	(Singapore) Geylang International	2023	2025
19	Timur Talipov	(Uzbekistan)	18 May 1995 (age 31)	(Kyrgyzstan) Neftchi Kochkor-Ata (K1)	2024	2025
	Ikram Mikhail Mustaqim	(Singapore)	5 August 2005 (age 21)	(Singapore) Young Lions	2023	2025
Midfielders
6	Azim Akbar	(Singapore) (Pakistan)	17 December 2001 (age 24)	(Singapore) Tanjong Pagar United U21	2021	2025
7	Naufal Ilham	(Singapore)	16 August 2002 (age 24)	(Singapore) SAFSA	2021	2025
8	Rezza Rezky	(Singapore)	8 November 2000 (age 25)	(Singapore) BG Tampines Rovers	2024	2025
10	Tomoki Wada	(Japan)	30 October 1994 (age 31)	(Maldives) Maziya (M1)	2024	2025
13	Fathullah Rahmat	(Singapore)	5 September 2002 (age 24)	(Singapore) BG Tampines Rovers	2021	2025
14	Umar Ramle	(Singapore)	2 May 1996 (age 30)	(Singapore) Hougang United	2024	2025
16	Raihan Rahman	(Singapore)	7 February 1991 (age 35)	(Singapore) Yishun Sentek Mariners FC (SFL1)	2025	2025
20	Hariysh Krishnakumar	(Singapore)	23 October 2002 (age 23)	Singapore Cricket Club (SFL1)	2025	2025
21	Suhairi Sabri	(Singapore)	23 April 1996 (age 30)	(Singapore) Yishun Sentek Mariners (SFL1)	2025	2025
25	Shodai Nishikawa	(Japan)	21 September 1993 (age 33)	(Cambodia) Angkor Tiger (C1)	2024	2025
Forwards
9	Salif Cissé	(France) (Mali)	12 July 1992 (age 34)	(Azerbaijan) Kapaz PFK (A1)	2024	2025
11	Zenivio ^{FP U21}	(Timor-Leste)	22 April 2005 (age 21)	(Cambodia) Kirivong Sok Sen Chey (C1)	2024	2025
17	Syahadat Masnawi	(Singapore)	7 November 2001 (age 24)	(Singapore) Young Lions	2024	2025
32	Sahil Suhaimi	(Singapore)	8 July 1992 (age 34)	(Singapore) Hougang United	2024	2025
Players left during season
4	Pathy Malumandsoko	(France) (Democratic Republic of the Congo)	11 May 2000 (age 26)	(Ukraine) Metalist Kharkiv (U1)	2024	2025
18	Fashah Iskandar	(Singapore)	15 February 1995 (age 31)	(Singapore) Warriors	2020	2025
22	Akram Azman	(Singapore)	21 November 2000 (age 25)	(Singapore) BG Tampines Rovers	2022	2025
21	Stefan Paunovic	(Serbia)	9 January 2002 (age 24)	(Serbia) FK Studentski Grad (Amateur)	2024	2025
Players on NS
7	Zahil Rahman	(Singapore)	3 March 2003 (age 23)	(Singapore) Tanjong Pagar United U21	2023	2025
12	Anaqi Ismit	(Singapore)	24 August 2001 (age 25)	(Singapore) Lion City Sailors	2024	2025

Remarks:
^{FP U21} These players are registered as U21 foreign players.

== Transfers ==
=== In ===
Preseason

Position	Player	Transferred From	Team	Ref
GK	(Singapore) Prathip Ekamparam	(Singapore) Young Lions	First Team	Free
DF	(France) (Democratic Republic of the Congo) Pathy Malumandsoko	(Ukraine) Metalist Kharkiv (U1)	First Team	Free
DF	(Uzbekistan) Timur Talipov	(Kyrgyzstan) Neftchi Kochkor-Ata (K1)	First Team	Free
DF	(New Zealand) Curtis Gray	(Singapore) Balestier Khalsa U21	U21	Free
DF	(Singapore) Bradly Yap Zhi Hao	(Singapore) Balestier Khalsa U21	U21	Free
DF	(Singapore) Aiqel Aliman	(Singapore) Lion City Sailors U21	U21	Free
DF	(Singapore) Rayyan Ramzdan	(Singapore) Lion City Sailors U21	U21	Free
DF	(Singapore) Rizqin Aniq	(Singapore) Lion City Sailors U21	U21	Free
DF	(Singapore) Nifail Noorhaizam	(Singapore) PVOSC (SFL1)	U21	Free
MF	(Singapore) Ihsan Hadi	(Singapore) Lion City Sailors U21	U21	Free
MF	(Singapore) Anaqi Ismit	(Singapore) Lion City Sailors	First Team	Free
MF	(Japan) (Singapore) Shodai Nishikawa	(Cambodia) Angkor Tiger (C1)	First Team	Free
MF	(Japan) Tomoki Wada	(Maldives) Maziya (M1)	First Team	Free
MF	(Serbia) Stefan Paunovic	(Serbia) FK Studentski Grad (Amateur)	First Team	Free
MF	(Singapore) Umar Ramle	(Singapore) Hougang United	First Team	Free
MF	(Singapore) Arsyad Basiron	(Singapore) Lion City Sailors U21	U21	Free
FW	(France) (Mali) Salif Cissé	(Azerbaijan) Kapaz PFK (A1)	First Team	Free
FW	(Timor-Leste) Zenivio	(Cambodia) Kirivong Sok Sen Chey (C1)	First Team	Free
FW	(Singapore) Syahadat Masnawi	(Singapore) Young Lions	First Team	Free
FW	(Singapore) Sahil Suhaimi	(Singapore) Hougang United	First Team	Free

Mid-season

Position	Player	Transferred From	Team	Ref
GK	(Canada) (Portugal) Matt Silva	(Philippines) Loyola	First Team	Free
DF	(England) (Thailand) (Wales) (Singapore) George Thomas	(Laos) Master 7 FC (L1)	U21	Free (Note: George Thomas moves to Upper Hutt City FC in NZL before joining Master 7 of Laos for the 2024/25 Lao League 1.)
MF	(Singapore) Raihan Rahman	(Singapore) Yishun Sentek Mariners FC	First team	Free
MF	(Singapore) Hariysh Krishnakumar	Singapore Cricket Club	First team	Free
MF	(Singapore) Suhairi Sabri	(Singapore) Yishun Sentek Mariners	First team	Free
FW	(Australia) (Japan) Thorsten Takashi Cross	(Singapore) Sailors Development Center U17	U21	Free

Postseason

Position	Player	Transferred From	Team	Ref
MF	(Singapore) Naqiuddin Eunos	(Singapore) Tanjong Pagar United	First Team	Free

=== Loan In ===
Position	Player	Transferred From	Team	Ref
MF	(Singapore) Rezza Rezky	(Singapore) BG Tampines Rovers	First Team	Season loan till May 2025
MF	(Singapore) Uvayn Kumar	(Singapore) Lion City Sailors U21	U21	Season loan till May 2025
DF	(Singapore) Marcus Mosses	(Singapore) Lion City Sailors U21	U21	Season loan till May 2025
FW	(Singapore) Izrafil Yusof	(Singapore) Lion City Sailors U21	U21	Season loan till May 2025

=== Loan Return ===
Preseason

Position	Player	Transferred From	Ref
FW	(Singapore) Hadiputradila Saswadimata	(Singapore) SAFSA	End of NS

Mid-season

Position	Player	Transferred From	Ref
MF	(Singapore) Fathullah Rahmat	(Singapore) Young Lions FC	End of NS
MF	(Singapore) Naufal Ilham	(Singapore) SAFSA	End of NS

=== Out ===
Preseason

Position	Player	Transferred To	Team	Ref
GK	(Singapore) Kenji Syed Rusydi	(Singapore) Hougang United	First team	Free
GK	(Singapore) Travis Ang	(Singapore) Young Lions	U21	Free.
DF	(Singapore) Tajeli Salamat	(Singapore) Balestier Khalsa	First team	Free
DF	(Singapore) Naqiuddin Eunos	(Singapore) Geylang International	First team	Free
DF	(Singapore) Shakir Hamzah	(Singapore) Geylang International	First team	Free
DF	(Brazil) Pedro Dias	(Indonesia) Persija Jakarta (I1)	First team	Free
DF	(Singapore) Haziq Riduan	(Singapore) Young Lions	U21	Free
DF	(Singapore) (Indonesia) Febryan Pradana	(Singapore) Young Lions	U21	Free
DF	(Singapore) Nifail Noorhaizam	(Singapore) PVOSC (SFL1)	U21	Free
DF	(Singapore) Ahmad Dzulfaqar	(Singapore)	U21	Free
MF	(Croatia) Mirko Šugić	(Croatia) NK Dubrava	First team	Free
MF	(Australia) Blake Ricciuto	(Australia) Rockdale Ilinden (A2)	First team	Free
MF	(Singapore) Raihan Rahman	(Singapore) Yishun Sentek Mariners FC	First team	Free
MF	(Singapore) Khairul Hairie	(Singapore)	First team	Free
MF	(Singapore) Zulfadhmi Suzliman	(Singapore) Warwick Knights (SFL2)	First team	Free
MF	(England) (Thailand) (Wales) (Singapore) George Thomas	(New Zealand) Upper Hutt City FC (N3)	U21	Free (Note: George Thomas moves to Upper Hutt City FC in NZL before joining Master 7 of Laos for the 2024/25 Lao League 1.)
FW	(Croatia) Marin Mudražija	(India) Rajasthan United	First team	Free
FW	(Singapore) Khairul Amri	Singapore Khalsa Association (SFL1)	First team	NA
FW	(Singapore) Syukri Bashir	(Japan) Albirex Niigata (S)	First team	Free
FW	(Singapore) Danial Herdy	(Singapore)	U21	Free
FW	(Australia) Charlie Traynor	(Singapore)	U21	Free

Mid-season

Position	Player	Transferred To	Team	Ref
GK	(Singapore) Fashah Iskandar	Retired	First Team	N.A.
DF	(France) (Democratic Republic of the Congo) Pathy Malumandsoko	(Italy) Legnago Salus (I3)	First Team	Free
DF	(Singapore) Akram Azman	(Singapore) Lion City Sailors	First Team	Undisclosed
MF	(Serbia) Stefan Paunovic	(Serbia) FK Studentski Grad (Amateur)	First Team	Free
DF	(New Zealand) Curtis Gray	(New Zealand) Cashmere Technical (N2)	U21	Free
MF	(Singapore) Rizqin Aniq	(Singapore) N.A.	U21	Free
MF	(Singapore) Uday Ghoshal	(Singapore) Geylang International	U17	Free
FW	(Singapore) Hadiputradila Saswadimata	(Singapore) Jungfrau Punggol FC	First Team	Free

Postseason

Position	Player	Transferred To	Team	Ref
DF	(Singapore) Shahrin Saberin	Retired	First team	Free

=== Loan Out ===
Preseason

Position	Player	Transferred To	Ref
FW	(Singapore) Hadiputradila Saswadimata	(Singapore) SAFSA	NS till Sept 2024
DF	(Singapore) Ikram Mikhail Mustaqim	(Singapore) Young Lions	NS till Jan 2025
MF	(Singapore) Fathullah Rahmat	(Singapore) SAFSA	NS till July 2025
MF	(Singapore) Naufal Ilham	(Singapore) SAFSA	NS till July 2025
MF	(Singapore) Anaqi Ismit	(Singapore) SAFSA	NS till June 2026
FW	(Singapore) Zahil Rahman	(Singapore) SAFSA	NS till June 2026

Mid-season

Position	Player	Transferred To	Ref

=== Extension / Retained ===
Position	Player	Ref
GK	(Singapore) Fashah Iskandar	1.5 years contract from Jan 2024 till Jun 2025
DF	(Singapore) Shahrin Saberin	1.5 years contract from Jan 2024 till Jun 2025
DF	(Singapore) Faizal Roslan	1.5 years contract from Jan 2024 till Jun 2025
DF	(Singapore) Syed Akmal	1.5 years contract from Jan 2024 till Jun 2025
DF	(Singapore) Akram Azman	1.5 years contract from Jan 2024 till Jun 2025
MF	(Singapore) Azim Akbar	1.5 years contract from Jan 2024 till Jun 2025

=== Promoted ===
Position	Player	Ref
DF	(Singapore) Farid Jafri	1.5 years contract from Jan 2024 till Jun 2025
MF	(Singapore) Daniel Elfian	1.5 years contract from Jan 2024 till Jun 2025
FW	(Singapore) Zahil Rahman	1.5 years contract from Jan 2024 till Jun 2025

== Friendly ==
=== Pre-season ===
Win Draw Loss

2024 SPL Interim Tournament – 23 Feb to 21 Apr

25 February 2024 1	Tanjong Pagar United (Singapore)	1–3	(Singapore) Geylang International	Tampines
	Risvi Aaqil 12'		Zach Whitehouse 45' (pen.); Irfan Rifqi 56'; Nur Ikhsanuddin 72'	Stadium: Our Tampines Hub

1 March 2024 2	Tanjong Pagar United (Singapore)	1–4	(Singapore) Balestier Khalsa	Bishan
	Faizal Roslan 90+1' (pen.)		Kodai Tanaka 4', 16'; Ismail Sassi 59'; Amiruldin Asraf 85'	Stadium: Bishan Stadium

10 March 2024 3	Tanjong Pagar United (Singapore)	1–5	(Singapore) Young Lions	Jalan Besar
	Rezza Rezky 11'		Danish Qayyum 20'; Farhan Zulkifli 25', 49'; Amir Syafiz 68' (pen.); Fathullah Rahmat 86' (pen.)	Stadium: Jalan Besar Stadium

13 April 2024 4	Tanjong Pagar United (Singapore)	4–0	(Japan) Albirex Niigata (S)	Jalan Besar
	Tomoki Wada 12'; Anaqi Ismit 48'; Rezza Rezky 64'; Fariz Fadilla Lubis 88'			Stadium: Jalan Besar Stadium

19 April 2024 5	Tanjong Pagar United (Singapore)	0–1	(Singapore) Hougang United	Jalan Besar
			Justin Hui 17'	Stadium: Jalan Besar Stadium

Others

25 March 2024 1	Tanjong Pagar United (Singapore)	4–4	Singapore U19	Jalan Besar
			Syazwan Latiff; Merrick Tan; Garv Sahoo; Kian Ghadessy	Stadium: Jalan Besar Stadium

31 March 2024 2	Johor Darul Ta'zim II (Malaysia)	4–0	(Singapore) Tanjong Pagar United	Johor
				Stadium: Pasir Gudang Corporation Stadium

7 May 2024 3	Negeri Sembilan FC (Malaysia)	2–0	(Singapore) Tanjong Pagar United	Paroi
	Zainal Abidin Jamil 41'; Takumi Sasaki 78' (pen.)			Stadium: Tuanku Abdul Rahman Stadium

=== Mid-season ===
4 January 2025 1	Tanjong Pagar United (Singapore)	3–3	(Singapore) Balestier Khalsa	Jurong East
				Stadium: Jurong East Stadium

11 January 2025 2	Tanjong Pagar United (Singapore)	10–0	(Singapore) Jungfrau Punggol FC (SFL2)	Jurong East
				Stadium: Jurong East Stadium

== Team statistics ==
=== Appearances and goals (SPL) ===
As of 25 May 2025

Numbers in parentheses denote appearances as substitute.

No.	Pos.	Player	SPL		Singapore Cup		Total	
No.	Pos.	Player	Apps.	Goals	Apps.	Goals	Apps.	Goals
1	GK	(Singapore) Prathip Ekamparam	10+1	0	0	0	11	0
2	DF	(Singapore) Farid Jafri	4+4	0	0+1	0	9	0
3	DF	(Singapore) Shahrin Saberin	6+3	0	0	0	9	0
5	DF	(Singapore) Syed Akmal	27+3	0	4	0	34	0
6	MF	(Singapore) Azim Akbar	18+5	0	4	0	27	0
7	MF	(Singapore) Naufal Ilham	0	0	0	0	0	0
8	MF	(Singapore) Rezza Rezky	22+3	1	3	0	28	1
9	FW	(France) (Mali) Salif Cissé	16+3	11	1+2	1	22	12
10	MF	(Japan) Tomoki Wada	31	2	4	0	35	2
11	FW	(Timor-Leste) Zenivio	25+6	1	2+1	0	34	1
13	MF	(Singapore) Fathullah Rahmat	3+1	0	0	0	4	0
14	MF	(Singapore) Umar Ramle	1+3	0	0	0	4	0
15	DF	(Singapore) Faizal Roslan	27+1	4	4	2	32	6
16	MF	(Singapore) Raihan Rahman	9+3	0	4	0	16	0
17	FW	(Singapore) Syahadat Masnawi	16+14	3	3+1	0	34	3
19	DF	(Uzbekistan) Timur Talipov	21+1	1	4	0	26	1
20	MF	(Singapore) Hariysh Krishnakumar	1	0	1+1	0	3	0
21	MF	(Singapore) Suhairi Sabri	0+1	0	0	0	1	0
23	GK	(Canada) (Portugal) Matt Silva	9	0	4	0	13	0
25	MF	(Japan) Shodai Nishikawa	21+1	3	2	0	24	3
28	GK	(Singapore) (Japan) Kimura Riki	6	0	0	0	6	0
32	FW	(Singapore) Sahil Suhaimi	11+18	4	1+3	0	33	4
51	MF	(Singapore) Ahmad Daniel	0+2	0	0	0	2	0
54	FW	(Japan) (England) Casey Seddon	0+1	0	0	0	1	0
57	DF	(Singapore) Ihsan Hadi	2+2	0	0	0	4	0
58	DF	(Singapore) Aiqel Aliman	0+3	0	0	0	3	0
59	MF	(Singapore) Arsyad Basiron	0+3	0	0	0	3	0
66	MF	(Singapore) Saiful Azhar Saifuddin	0+4	0	0	0	4	0
68	MF	(Singapore) Taressh Kannan	0+1	0	0	0	1	0
69	MF	(Singapore) Tarunn Kannan	0+1	0	0	0	1	0
70	MF	(France) (Sweden) (Finland) (Singapore) Thelonious Linden	0+1	0	0	0	1	0
73	MF	(Australia) Thorsten Takashi Cross	4+6	0	2+1	0	13	0
74	MF	(Singapore) Daniel Elfian	2+3	0	0	0	5	0
75	DF	(England) (Wales) (Thailand) (Singapore) George Thomas	1	0	1	0	2	0
77	FW	(Singapore) Izrafil Yusof	1+8	1	0+4	0	13	1
78	DF	(Singapore) Marcus Mosses	7+3	0	0+1	0	11	0
Players who have played this season but had left the club or on loan to other club
4	DF	(France) (Democratic Republic of the Congo) Pathy Malumandsoko	11	0	0	0	11	0
7	FW	(Singapore) Zahil Rahman	0+2	0	0	0	2	0
12	MF	(Singapore) Anaqi Ismit	4+1	1	0	0	5	1
18	GK	(Singapore) Fashah Iskandar	6+1	0	0	0	7	0
21	MF	(Serbia) Stefan Paunovic	13+1	1	0	0	14	1
22	DF	(Singapore) Akram Azman	12+1	2	0	0	13	2
55	DF	(New Zealand) Curtis Gray	3+1	0	0	0	4	0
65	MF	(Singapore) Rizqin Aniq	1+2	0	0	0	3	0

== Competitions ==
=== Overview ===
Competition	Record							
Competition	P	W	D	L	GF	GA	GD	Win %

=== Singapore Premier League ===
Win Draw Loss

19 May 2024 1	Tanjong Pagar United (Singapore)	0–5	(Singapore) Balestier Khalsa	Jurong East
	Faizal Roslan (yellow card) 49' (yellow-red card) 55'; Anaqi Ismit (yellow card) 88'		Kodai Tanaka 20', 40'; Riku Fukashiro 45', 60'; Amiruldin Asraf 90+1'; Masahiro Sugita (yellow card) 69'	Stadium: Jurong East Stadium; Referee: Syarqawi Buhari; Man of the Match: (Japan) Kodai Tanaka

26 May 2024 2	Tanjong Pagar United (Singapore)	1–1	(Singapore) Hougang United	Jurong East
	Stefan Paunovic 87' (yellow card) 8'; Akram Azman (yellow card) 37'; Shahrin Saberin (yellow card) 75'; Rezza Rezky (red card) 90+1'		Jordan Vestering 90+4'	Stadium: Jurong East Stadium; Referee: Ahmad A'Qashah; Man of the Match: (Serbia) Stefan Paunovic

16 June 2024 3	BG Tampines Rovers (Singapore)	3–0	(Singapore) Tanjong Pagar United	Jalan Besar
	Boris Kopitović 6' (pen.); Glenn Kweh 61'; Seia Kunori 63'; Miloš Zlatković (yellow card) 77'		Zenivio (yellow card) 79'	Stadium: Jalan Besar Stadium; Referee: Hilmi Fuad; Man of the Match: (Japan) Kyoga Nakamura

22 June 2024 4	Young Lions (Singapore)	3–2	(Singapore) Tanjong Pagar United	Jalan Besar
	Amir Syafiz 45'; Khairin Nadim 55'; Itsuki Enomoto 82'; Danish Qayyum (yellow card) 42'; Farhan Zulkifli (yellow card) 52'; Nur Adam Abdullah (yellow card) 72'		Sahil Suhaimi 25'; Salif Cissé 40'	Stadium: Jalan Besar Stadium; Referee: Taufik Thana; Man of the Match: (Japan) Itsuki Enomoto

29 June 2024 5	Tanjong Pagar United (Singapore)	3–2	(Brunei) DPMM	Jurong East
	Salif Cissé 33'; Anaqi Ismit 42'; Syahadat Masnawi 85'; Faizal Roslan (yellow card) 90+5'		Miguel Oliveira 53' (yellow card) 90+5'; Julio Cruz 58' (pen.)	Stadium: Jurong East Stadium; Referee: Oswind Suriya; Man of the Match: (Mali) (France) Salif Cissé

7 July 2024 6	Lion City Sailors (Singapore)	3–0	(Singapore) Tanjong Pagar United	Bishan
	Maxime Lestienne 2'; Adam Swandi 40'; Bailey Wright 86'; Anumanthan Kumar (yellow card) 63'		Akram Azman (yellow card) 90+2'	Stadium: Bishan Stadium; Referee: Jansen Foo; Man of the Match: (Singapore) Adam Swandi

12 July 2024 7	Tanjong Pagar United (Singapore)	2–1	(Japan) Albirex Niigata (S)	Jurong East
	Salif Cissé 75' (penalty missed) 71; Faizal Roslan 86' (pen.); Stefan Paunovic (yellow card) 45+1'; Hafiz Osman (yellow card) 45+1'; Syed Akmal (red card) 50'		Shingo Nakano 16'; Gareth Low (yellow card) 67'; Hassan Sunny (yellow card) 84'	Stadium: Jurong East Stadium; Referee: Taufik Thana; Man of the Match: (France) (Mali) Salif Cissé

19 July 2024 8	Geylang International (Singapore)	5–3	(Singapore) Tanjong Pagar United	Jalan Besar
	Tomoyuki Doi 25', 72' (yellow card) 65'; Ryoya Tanigushi 65'; Shakir Hamzah (yellow card) 45+2'; Naqiuddin Eunos 88'; Naufal Azman 90+6'		Salif Cissé 20'; Faizal Roslan 40'; Sahil Suhaimi 45+1'	Stadium: Jalan Besar Stadium; Referee: Clarence Leow; Man of the Match: (Japan) Tomoyuki Doi

24 July 2024 9	Balestier Khalsa (Singapore)	5–2	(Singapore) Tanjong Pagar United	Bishan
	Kodai Tanaka 12', 49', 59' (penalty missed) 81; Ismail Sassi 42'; Ignatius Ang 82'; Jordan Emaviwe (yellow card) 90+2'		Shodai Nishikawa 19', 56'	Stadium: Bishan Stadium; Referee: Oswind Suriya; Man of the Match: (Japan) Kodai Tanaka

3 August 2024 10	Tanjong Pagar United (Singapore)	0–3	(Singapore) BG Tampines Rovers	Jurong East
	Zenivio (yellow card) 43'		Boris Kopitović 12'; Seia Kunori 25'; Faris Ramli 45'	Stadium: Jurong East Stadium; Referee: Muhammad Taqi; Man of the Match: (Japan) Shuya Yamashita

11 August 2024 11	Hougang United (Singapore)	5–1	(Singapore) Tanjong Pagar United	Jalan Besar
	Dejan Račić 22', 28', 74'; Stjepan Plazonja 83', 90+1'; Ismail Salihović (yellow card) 39'; Zamani Zamri (yellow card) 88'		Salif Cissé 41'; Shahrin Saberin (yellow card) 69'	Stadium: Jalan Besar Stadium; Referee: Jansen Foo; Man of the Match: (Croatia) Stjepan Plazonja

24 August 2024 12	Tanjong Pagar United (Singapore)	1–3	(Singapore) Young Lions	Jurong East
	Shodai Nishikawa 36'; Salif Cissé (yellow card) 60'		Jun Kobayashi 6'; Danish Qayyum 41'; Kieran Teo Jia Jun 54'; Itsuki Enomoto (yellow card) 75'	Stadium: Jurong East Stadium; Referee: Clarence Leow; Man of the Match: (Singapore) Danish Qayyum

31 August 2024 13	DPMM (Brunei)	1–1	(Singapore) Tanjong Pagar United	Bandar Seri Begawan
	Faizal Roslan 30' (o.g.); Yura Indera Putera Yunos (yellow card) 36'; Nurikhwan Othman (yellow card) 72'		Salif Cissé 66'; Syed Akmal (yellow card) 28'	Stadium: Hassanal Bolkiah National Stadium; Referee: Jansen Foo; Man of the Match: (France) (Senegal) Salif Cissé

14 September 2024 14	Tanjong Pagar United (Singapore)	0–6	(Singapore) Lion City Sailors	Jurong East
	Faizal Roslan (yellow card) 45'; Timur Talipov (red card) 50'; Rizqin Aniq (yellow card) 90+1'		Abdul Rasaq 32' (pen.); Adam Swandi 36'; Shawal Anuar 37'; Bart Ramselaar 55'; Lennart Thy 77', 82'; Bill Mamadou (yellow card) 7'; Anumanthan Kumar (red card) 63'	Stadium: Jurong East Stadium; Referee: Farhan Mohd; Man of the Match: (Germany) Lennart Thy

20 September 2024 15	Albirex Niigata (S) (Japan)	4–1	(Singapore) Tanjong Pagar United	Jurong East
	Shingo Nakano 45+20', 68'; Shuhei Hoshino 58', 72'		Akram Azman 67'	Stadium: Jurong East Stadium; Referee: Syarqawi Buhari; Man of the Match: (Japan) Shuhei Hoshino

28 September 2024 16	Tanjong Pagar United (Singapore)	2–7	(Singapore) Geylang International	Jurong East
	Tomoki Wada 19'; Akram Azman 41'; Stefan Paunovic (yellow card) 45+4'		Tomoyuki Doi 18' (pen.), 74', 79'; Ryoya Tanigushi 23'; Naqiuddin Eunos 33'; Shakir Hamzah 44'; Vincent Bezecourt 63'	Stadium: Jurong East Stadium; Referee: Zulfiqar Mustaffa; Man of the Match: (Japan) Tomoyuki Doi

28 October 2024 17 (Rescheduled)	Tanjong Pagar United (Singapore)	0–5	(Singapore) Balestier Khalsa	Jurong East
	Syahadat Masnawi (yellow card) 42'; Rezza Rezky (yellow card) 50'; Faizal Roslan (yellow card) 83'; Daniel Elfian (yellow card) 90+3'		Ismail Sassi 14'; Kodai Tanaka 38' (pen.), 49' (penalty missed) 90 Ignatius Ang 46' (yellow card) 44'; Jordan Emaviwe 80'	Stadium: Jurong East Stadium; Referee: Andrea Verolino; Man of the Match: (Japan) Kodai Tanaka

1 November 2024 18	Hougang United (Singapore)	6–0	(Singapore) Tanjong Pagar United	Jalan Besar
	Shahdan Sulaiman 9'; Dejan Račić 10', 78' (pen.); Nazhiim Harman 47'; Gabriel Quak 66'; Petar Banović 88'		Faizal Roslan (yellow card) 40'; Sahil Suhaimi (yellow card) 45+2'; Shahrin Saberin (yellow card) 77'; Jaslee Hatta (yellow card) 87'	Stadium: Jalan Besar Stadium; Referee: Hilmi Fuad; Man of the Match: (Montenegro) Dejan Račić

22 November 2024 19 (Rescheduled)	BG Tampines Rovers (Singapore)	5–0	(Singapore) Tanjong Pagar United	Jalan Besar
	Faris Ramli 18'; Seia Kunori 21'; Glenn Kweh 47'; Boris Kopitović 54', 86' (pen.)		Umar Ramlee (yellow card) 58'	Stadium: Jalan Besar Stadium; Referee: Ahmad A'Qashah; Man of the Match: (Montenegro) Boris Kopitović

18 January 2025 20	Young Lions (Singapore)	1–1	(Singapore) Tanjong Pagar United	Jalan Besar
	Kaisei Ogawa 53' (pen.)		Sahil Suhaimi 74' (yellow card) 90+4'; Shahrin Saberin (yellow card) 52'	Stadium: Jalan Besar Stadium; Referee: Farhan Mohd; Man of the Match: (Timor-Leste) Zenivio

26 January 2025 21	Tanjong Pagar United (Singapore)	3–0	(Brunei) DPMM	Jurong East
	Syahadat Masnawi 20'; Salif Cissé 80'; Izrafil Yusof 90+7'; Syed Akmal (yellow card) 54'; Matt Silva (yellow card) 90+2'		Dāvis Ikaunieks (yellow card) 35'; Azwan Ali Rahman (yellow card) 44'; Yura Indera Putera Yunos (yellow card) 55'; Miguel Oliveira (yellow card) 60'; Nur Ikhwan Othman (yellow card) 87'	Stadium: Jurong East Stadium; Referee: Clarence Leow; Man of the Match: (Mali) (France) Salif Cissé

9 February 2025 22 (Rescheduled)	Lion City Sailors (Singapore)	4–1	(Singapore) Tanjong Pagar United	Bishan
	Lennart Thy 11', 59', 69'; Bailey Wright 24'		Tomoki Wada 89'; Faizal Roslan (yellow card) 22' (yellow-red card) 74'	Stadium: Bishan Stadium; Referee: Andrea Verolino; Man of the Match: (Germany) Lennart Thy

21 February 2025 23	Tanjong Pagar United (Singapore)	1–2	(Japan) Albirex Niigata (S)	Jurong East
	Timur Talipov 61' (pen.); Raihan Rahman (yellow card) 51' (yellow-red card) 83'		Matt Silva 25' (o.g.); Shuhei Hoshino 90+1'	Stadium: Jurong East Stadium; Referee: Hilmi Fuad; Man of the Match: (Japan) Shuhei Hoshino

27 February 2025 24	Geylang International (Singapore)	5–0	(Singapore) Tanjong Pagar United	Jalan Besar
	Ryoya Taniguchi 3'; Vincent Bezecourt 7'; Tomoyuki Doi 53', 78' (pen.), 90'		Faizal Roslan (yellow card) 16'; Hariysh Krishnakumar (yellow card) 54'	Stadium: Jalan Besar Stadium; Referee: Muhammad Taqi; Man of the Match: (Japan) Ryoya Taniguchi

5 April 2025 25	Balestier Khalsa (Singapore)	3–3	(Singapore) Tanjong Pagar United	Bishan
	Anton Fase 59'; Marcus Mosses 71' (o.g.); Alen Kozar 90+6' (pen.)		Faizal Roslan 11'; Syahadat Masnawi 36'; Zenivio 80'; Marcus Mosses (yellow card) 45+1'; Raihan Rahman (yellow card) 61'; Tomoki Wada (yellow card) 65'; Syed Akmal (yellow card) 90+10'	Stadium: Bishan Stadium; Referee: Jansen Foo; Man of the Match: (Slovenia) Alen Kozar

11 April 2025 26 (Rescheduled)	Tanjong Pagar United (Singapore)	0–2	(Singapore) BG Tampines Rovers	Jurong East
	Azim Akbar (yellow card) 47'; Marcus Mosses (yellow card) 82'		Faris Ramli 40', 60'; Shah Shahiran (yellow card) 23'	Stadium: Jurong East Stadium; Referee: Oswind Suriya; Man of the Match: (Singapore) Faris Ramli

13 May 2025 27 (Rescheduled)	Tanjong Pagar United (Singapore)	1–1	(Singapore) Hougang United	Jurong East
	Faizal Roslan 73'; Timur Talipov (red card) 19'; Azim Akbar (yellow card) 82'		Dejan Račić 42'; Anders Aplin (yellow card) 23'; Zulfahmi Arifin (yellow card) 31'; Ratthathammanun Deeying (yellow card) 52'; Daniel Alemão (yellow card) 58' (yellow-red card) 61'; Tajeli Salamat (yellow card) 81'; Jordan Vestering (yellow card) 89'	Stadium: Jurong East Stadium; Referee: Hilmi Fuad; Man of the Match: (Singapore) Zaiful Nizam

7 May 2025 28 (Rescheduled)	Tanjong Pagar United (Singapore)	1–1	(Singapore) Young Lions	Jurong East
	Salif Cissé 45'; Shahrin Saberin (yellow card) 20'; Izrafil Yusof (yellow card) 30'		Raihan Rahman 83' (o g.); Bill Mamadou (yellow card) 85'	Stadium: Jurong East Stadium; Referee: Zulfiqar Mustaffa; Man of the Match: (Mali) (France) Salif Cissé

2 May 2025 29	DPMM (Brunei)	2–1	(Singapore) Tanjong Pagar United	Bandar Seri Begawan
	Dāvis Ikaunieks 9', 29'; Abdul Hariz Herman (yellow card) 46'; Haimie (yellow card) 87'		Sahil Suhaimi 81'; Syed Akmal (yellow card) 28' (yellow-red card); Faizal Roslan (yellow card) 45'	Stadium: Hassanal Bolkiah National Stadium; Referee: Jansen Foo; Man of the Match: (Latvia) Dāvis Ikaunieks

10 May 2025 30	Tanjong Pagar United (Singapore)	0–1	(Singapore) Lion City Sailors	Jurong East
	Azim Akbar (yellow card) 45+5'; Rezza Rezky (yellow card) 66'		Maxime Lestienne 20' (pen.); Shawal Anuar (yellow card) 58'; Toni Datković (yellow card) 85'	Stadium: Jurong East Stadium; Referee: Oswind Suriya; Man of the Match: (Canada) Matt Silva

16 May 2025 31	Albirex Niigata (S) (Japan)	5–1	(Singapore) Tanjong Pagar United	Jurong East
	Shingo Nakano 4', 78'; Junki Kenn Yoshimura 42'; Thorsten Takashi Cross 66' (o.g.); Shuhei Hoshino 83'; Daniel Goh (penalty missed) 87; Arshad Shamim (yellow card) 24'; SteviaEgbus Mikuni (yellow card) 74'		Salif Cissé 14'; Marcus Mosses (yellow card) 58'; Sahil Suhaimi (yellow card) 90+1'	Stadium: Jurong East Stadium; Referee: Syarqawi Buhari; Man of the Match: (Japan) Shingo Nakano

25 May 2025 32	Tanjong Pagar United (Singapore)	3–3	(Singapore) Geylang International	Jurong East
	Salif Cissé 29', 49'; Rezza Rezky 55'; Raihan Rahman (yellow card) 45+3'; Faizal Roslan (yellow card) 90'		Ryoya Taniguchi 35', 65' (yellow card) 71'; Keito Hariya 75'; Hud Ismail (yellow card) 70'; Faisal Shahrin (yellow card) 83'	Stadium: Jurong East Stadium; Referee: Farhan Mohd; Man of the Match: (Singapore) Prathip Ekamparam

Pos	Team	Pld	W	D	L	GF	GA	GD	Pts	Qualification or relegation
1	Lion City Sailors (C)	32	22	6	4	96	32	+64	72	Qualification for Champions League Two group stage & ASEAN Club Championship (Note: Since the winners of the 2024–25 Singapore Cup, Lion City Sailors, had already qualified for the AFC Champions League Two and ASEAN Club Championship, the spot given to the Singapore Cup winners (Champions League Two) was passed to the second-placed team.)
2	BG Tampines Rovers	32	19	7	6	84	37	+47	64	Qualification for Champions League Two group stage & ASEAN Club Championship
3	Geylang International	32	15	9	8	97	64	+33	54	
4	Balestier Khalsa	32	14	6	12	84	80	+4	48	
5	DPMM (Note: Ineligible for AFC competition spots)	32	12	8	12	54	61	−7	44	Transferred to the 2025–26 Malaysia Super League post-season
6	Albirex Niigata (S)	32	13	3	16	55	71	−16	42	
7	Hougang United	32	7	10	15	61	76	−15	31	
8	Young Lions	32	7	8	17	47	89	−42	29	
9	Tanjong Pagar United	32	3	7	22	35	103	−68	16	

Updated to match(es) played on 25 May 2025. Source: Singapore Premier League
Rules for classification: 1) points; 2) goal difference; 3) number of goals scored; 4) number of wins
(C) Champions

=== Singapore Cup ===
Pos	Team	Pld	W	D	L	GF	GA	GD	Pts	Qualification
1	Lion City Sailors	4	3	1	0	12	4	+8	10	Semi-finals
2	BG Pathum United	4	2	2	0	7	5	+2	8	Semi-finals
3	Balestier Khalsa	4	2	0	2	10	10	0	6	
4	Tanjong Pagar United	4	1	0	3	3	9	−6	3	
5	Geylang International	4	0	1	3	7	11	−4	1	

Source: FAS

Win Draw Loss

2 February 2025 Group Match 1	Tanjong Pagar United (Singapore)	1–2	(Thailand) BG Pathum United	Jurong East
	Salif Cissé 11'; Rezza Rezky (yellow card) 43'; Shodai Nishikawa (yellow card) 45'	Report	Marco Ballini 22'; Hwang Myung-hyun 76'; Kanokpon Buspakom (yellow card) 53'	Stadium: Jurong East Stadium; Referee: Jansen Foo

16 February 2025 Group Match 2	Lion City Sailors (Singapore)	4–1	(Singapore) Tanjong Pagar United	Bishan
	Bart Ramselaar 26', 47'; Akram Azman 78'; Abdul Rasaq 88'	Report	Faizal Roslan 70'; Raihan Rahman (yellow card) 35'	Stadium: Bishan Stadium; Referee: Zulfiqar Mustaffa

15 March 2025 Group Match 3	Tanjong Pagar United (Singapore)	1–0	(Singapore) Geylang International	Jurong East
	Faizal Roslan 83' (pen.); Zenivio (yellow card) 25'; Rezza Rezky (yellow card) 26'		Rio Sakuma (yellow card) 35'; Naufal Azman (yellow card) 87'	Stadium: Jurong East Stadium; Referee: Farhan Mohd

29 March 2025 Group Match 4	Balestier Khalsa (Singapore)	3–0	(Singapore) Tanjong Pagar United	Bishan
	Kodai Tanaka 12', 18'; Masahiro Sugita 76'		Azim Akbar (yellow card) 75'; Zenivio (yellow card) 90'	Stadium: Bishan Stadium; Referee: Syarqawi Buhari
