= 2024 Singapore Youth League =

1st season of the Singapore Youth League

Singapore Youth League
- Season: 2024
- Dates: 24 February 2024 - 1 December 2024
- Champions: Albirex COE
- All statistics correct as of 31 December 2024.

The 2024 Singapore Youth League is the inaugural season of Singapore Youth League (SYL). The inaugural season is set to feature over 200 registered teams from 52 clubs and academies across various age groups. The league will kick off on the weekend of 24 and 25 February 2024.

The competition will involve children of various age groups from U-8s, U-10s, U-12s, U-13s, U-15s and U-17. A promotion-relegation system, with three divisions planned for U-13s, U-15s and U-17s, are in the planning.

Prior to the inaugural season, teams will undergo an initial classification round of matches to help determine their level. Based on the results of the classification round, teams will be placed in divisions consisting of sides of similar strength for the league proper. The SYL will include a promotion/relegation feature across all age groups, where teams can move up or down divisions based on performance.

The groups for the classification round were drawn on 6 February 2024. The results of the draw was posted via SYL social media.

== Competition format ==
Age-group categories
Categories	No. of teams	Format	Duration per match
Under-17	28 teams	11v11	90-minute
Under-15	33 teams	11v11	90-minute
Under-13	25 teams	11v11	80-minute
Under-12	39 teams	9v9	60-minute
Under-10	46 teams	7v7	30-minute
Under-8	38 teams	5v5	24-minute

== Participating Clubs ==
Clubs withdrawn from the competition will be strikethrough.

=== Under-17 clubs ===
Classification Groups
Club	Group
Admiralty CSN	A
Balestier Khalsa	A
Barça Academy	A
F17 Football Academy	A
Singapore Football Club	A
Tanjong Pagar United	A
Task Sailors East	A
ActiveSG FA	B
East Coast United FA	B
Geylang International	B
Hougang United	B
Pasirian Lions FC	B
Star Soccer Academy	B
Verde Cresta Combined SC	B
Albirex Niigata (S)	C
Changi Simei FA	C
Coerver Coaching SG	C
FFF Academy	C
Singapore Khalsa Association	C
Tampines Rovers	C
Woodlands Warriors FC	C
Albirex Singapore FA	D
Global Football Academy	D
Lion City Sailors	D
Marsiling CSN J7 United FC	D
St Michael's Soccer Academy	D
Tasek Sailors West	D
Woodlands Lions FC	D

=== Under-15 clubs ===
Classification Groups
Club	Group
Balestier Khalsa	A
EuroAsia FC	A
F17 Football Academy	A
Hougang United	A
~~Island City FC~~	A
Lion City Sailors	A
Pasirian Lions FC	A
School Football Academy	A
Tasek Sailors West A	A
Verde Cresta Combined SC	A
Westwood El'Junior FC	A
ActiveSG FA	B
Albirex Niigata (S)	B
Barça Academy	B
East Coast United FA	B
Euro Soccer Academy	B
FFF Academy	B
Geylang International	B
(Malaysia) Johor Darul Ta'zim FC	B
St Michael's Soccer Academy	B
Tasek Sailors East	B
Woodlands Lions FC	B
Admiralty CSN	C
Albirex Singapore FA	C
Flair Football Academy	C
Global Football Academy	C
Marsiling CSN J7 United FC	C
Singapore Sports School	C
Star Soccer Academy	C
Tampines Rovers	C
Tanjong Pagar United	C
Tasek Sailors West B	C
Woodlands Warriors FC	C

=== Under-13 clubs ===
Classification Groups
Club	Group
Hougang United	A
Pasirian Lions FC	A
Singapore Sports School	A
Tanjong Pagar United	A
Woodlands Lions FC	A
Balestier Khalsa	B
Barça Academy	B
EuroAsia FC	B
FFF Academy	B
Tampines Rovers	B
Coerver Coaching SG	C
Geylang International	C
(Malaysia) Johor Darul Ta'zim FC	C
NDC Girls U15	C
Star Soccer Academy	C
~~Coerver Coaching SG~~	C
ActiveSG FA	D
(Japan) Albirex Niigata (S)	D
~~Gaulois Academy~~	D
Island City FC A	D
St Michael's Soccer Academy	D
Albirex Singapore FA	E
Flair Football Academy	E
Island City FC B	E
Lion City Sailors	E
Verde Cresta Combined SC	E

=== Under-12 clubs ===
Classification Groups
Club	Group
Albirex Singapore FA	A
Bukit Batok East CSN	A
Hougang United AFA	A
Island City FC	A
Junior NDC U11 Team Blue	A
Liverpool FC IA SG Alisson	A
Pasirian Lions FC	A
SG7 Soccer Academic	A
Tampines Rovers AFA	A
Albirex AFA	B
Barca Sports Dev 2012	B
Changi Simei FA	B
EuroAsia FC	B
FFF Academy	B
Gaulois Warriors	B
Geylang International AFA	B
Liverpool FC IA SG Szoboszlai	B
NDC Girls	B
Woodlands Lions FC Team A	B
Eastern Thunder FC	C
First Kick Nebulas	C
Flair Football Academy 12B	C
GoalKick FA	C
Junior NDC U11 Team Red	C
Liverpool FC IA SG Gakpo	C
Soaring Dreams FA	C
St Michael's Soccer Academy	C
Star Soccer Academy	C
Woodlands Lions FC Team B	C
Absolute Football Academy	D
Admiralty CSN	D
Balestier Khalsa AFA	D
Flair Football Academy 12A	D
Junior NDC U12 Team Blue	D
Junior NDC U12 Team Red	D
Lion City Sailors	D
Spanish Soccer Club Asia	D
Tanjong Pagar United AFA	D

=== Under-10 clubs ===
Classification Groups
Club	Group
Admiralty CSN	A
Bukit Batok East CSN A	A
Celtic SA SG Get Gungho FC	A
Changi Simei FA	A
Eastern Thunder FC	A
Geylang International AFA	A
GoalKick FA	A
Junior NDC U9 Team Blue	A
Junior NDC U9 Team Red	A
Junior NDC U9 Team White	A
Liverpool FC IA SG Diaz	A
Tampines Rovers AFA	A
Albirex AFA	B
Barça Academy Groc 2014	B
Bukit Batok East CSN B	B
First Kick Supernovas	B
Hougang United AFA	B
Junior NDC U10 Team Red	B
Liverpool FC IA SG Salah	B
Liverpool FC IA SG Van Dijk	B
Pasirian Lions FC	B
SG7 Soccer Academic	B
Woodlands Lions FC Team A	B
Woodlands Lions FC Team B	B
Absolute Football Academy	C
Albirex Singapore FA	C
EuroAsia FC	C
FFF Academy	C
First Kick Hypernovas	C
Flair Football Academy (2)	C
Junior NDC U10 Team Blue	C
Liverpool FC IA SG Arnold	C
Singapore Cricket Club	C
Soaring Dreams FA White Swans	C
Spanish Soccer Club Asia	C
Star Soccer Academy	C
Balestier Khalsa AFA	D
Barça Academy Grana 2014	D
Barca Sports Dev 2014	D
Coerver Coaching SG	D
Flair Football Academy	D
Junior NDC Girls	D
KiQ OFF Football	D
Liverpool FC IA SG Endo	D
Soaring Dreams FA Kirins	D
St Michael's Soccer Academy	D
Tanjong Pagar United AFA	D

=== Under-8 clubs ===
Classification Groups
Club	Group
Albirex AFA	A
Barça Academy Groc 2017	A
First Kick Brilliance	A
Global Football Academy	A
GoalKick FA	A
Junior NDC Girls	A
Junior NDC U8 Team Red	A
Junior NDC U8 Team White	A
Star Soccer Academy	A
Tampines Rovers AFA	A
Albirex Singapore FA	B
Bukit Batok East CSN A	B
Bukit Batok East CSN B	B
Coerver Coaching SG ~~Team B~~	B
FFF Academy	B
First Kick Excellence	B
Flair Football Academy 8A	B
Gaulois Invincibles	B
Geylang International AFA	B
Pasirian Lions FC	B
Admiralty CSN	C
Barça Academy Blau 2017	C
Barça Academy Grana 2016	C
Barça Academy Orange 2016	C
Celtic SA SG Get Gungho FC	C
Flair Football Academy 8B	C
Hougang United AFA	C
Liverpool FC IA SG Jones	C
Spanish Soccer Club Asia	C
Tanjong Pagar United AFA	C
Balestier Khalsa AFA	D
~~Coerver Coaching SG Team A~~	D
Gaulois Espoirs	D
Junior NDC U8 Team Blue	D
Liverpool FC IA SG Nunez	D
Munich Football School SG (B8)	D
St Michael's Soccer Academy	D
Woodlands Lions FC	D

== Winners ==
=== Under-17 ===
Position	Champions	Runners-up
Division 1	Lion City Sailors	Geylang International
Division 2	St Michael's Soccer Association	STAR Soccer Academy
Division 3	Verde Cresta Combined SC	FFF Academy

=== Under-15 ===
Position	Champions	Runners-up
Division 1	(Malaysia) Johor Darul Ta'zim FC	Singapore Sports School
Division 2	(Spain) Barcelona Academy	(Japan) Albirex Niigata (S)
Division 3	East Coast United FA	Woodlands Lions FC

=== Under-13 ===
Position	Champions	Runners-up
Division 1	(Malaysia) Johor Darul Ta'zim FC	Singapore Sports School
Division 2	Flair Football Academy	ActiveSG FA

=== Under-12 ===
Position	Champions	Runners-up
Division 1	Island City FC	Junior NDC Team Red
Division 2	Albirex Singapore FA	Junior NDC U11 Team Blue
Division 3	Pasirian Lions FC	St Michaels Soccer Association
Division 4	Liverpool FC IA SG Gakpo	Liverpool FC IA SG U11 Szoboszlai

=== Under-10 ===
Position	Champions	Runners-up
Division 1	Geylang International AFA	Junior NDC Team Red
Division 2	Junior NDC U9 Team White	SG7 Soccer Academic
Division 3	Tanjong Pagar United AFA	Balestier Khalsa AFA
Division 4	First Kick Hypernovas	Liverpool FC IA SG Van Dijk

=== Under-8 ===
Position	Champions	Runners-up
Division 1	Spanish Soccer Club Asia	Geylang International AFA
Division 2	Junior NDC Team Red	Barca Academy Orange 2016
Division 3	Balestier Khalsa AFA	Albirex Singapore FA
Division 4	FFF Academy	Bukit Batok East CSN Team B

== Incident ==
On 27 April 2024, 3 SYL matches to be played at Bukit Gombak Stadium were postponed because the stadium was used for an archery competition between 25 and 28 April. The affected matches were Woodlands Lions U13 against Hougang U13, Geylang U13 against National Development Centre girls’ U15 and Woodlands Warriors U17 against ActiveSG U17. According to clubs' statements, SYL organisers failed to secure the venue and communicate the lack of venue to the various clubs.

On 24 August 2024, the players from Balestier Khalsa U17 and Lion City Sailors U17 were seen pushing one another during the game which the Sailors won 3-1. Players on the bench and coaches also got involved, with Balestier Under-17s coach Ali Imran Lomri seen being held back by some officials in a fiery exchange with his Sailors counterpart Jasni Hatta. Despite receiving red cards during the match, both Ali and Jasni were involved in another confrontation on the pitch after the game. Both officials were disciplined for their misconduct.

== See also ==
- Football in Singapore
- Football Association of Singapore
- Prime League
- Singapore football league system
