= 2024–25 Lion City Sailors FC season =

Lion City Sailors
2024–25 season
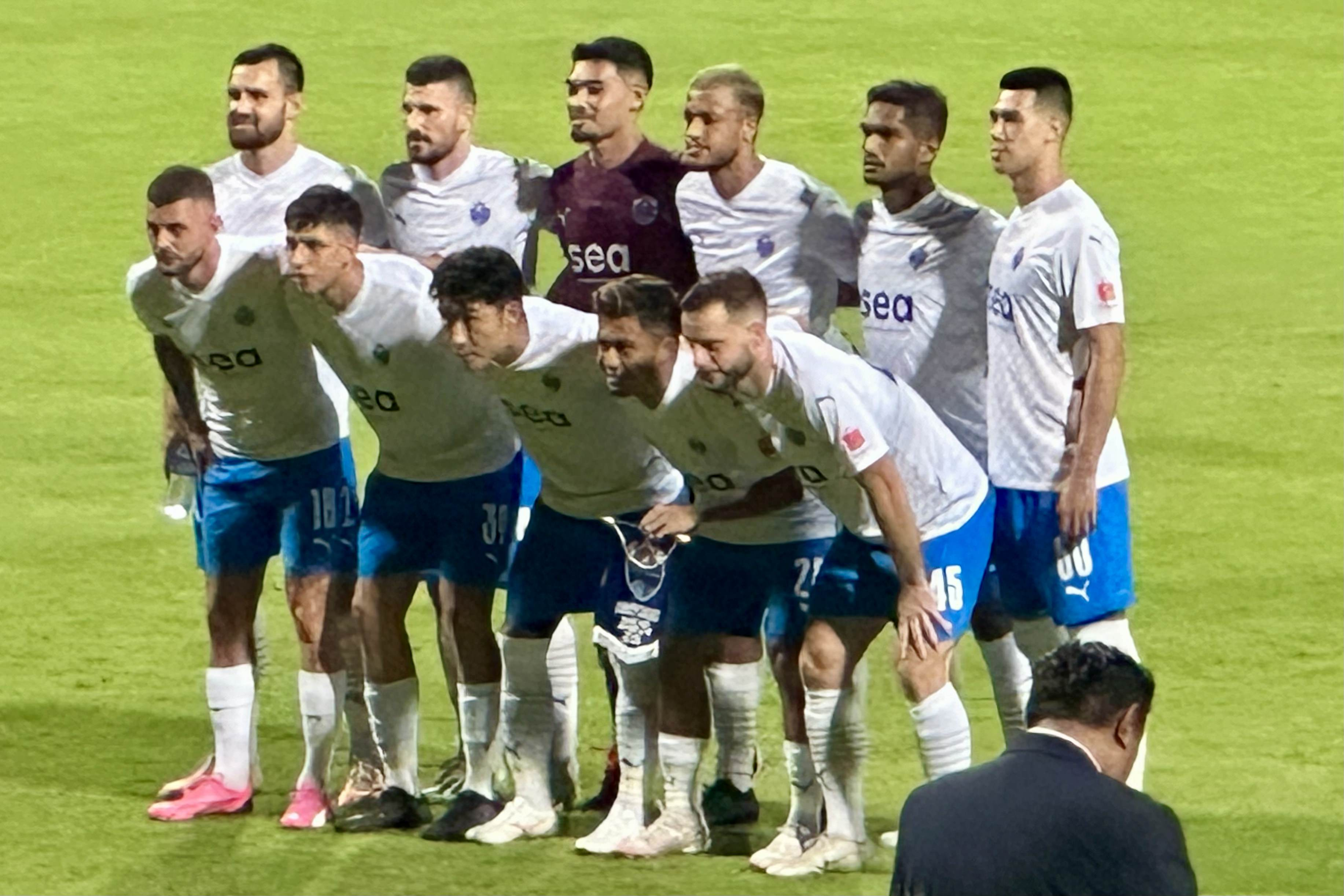
- Match between Lion City Sailors and Johor Darul Ta'zim
- Owner: Sea Limited
- Chairman: Forrest Li
- Head coach: Aleksandar Ranković
- Stadium: Bishan Stadium
- Singapore Premier League: 1st
- Singapore Cup: Winners
- AFC Champions League Two: Runners-up
- ASEAN Club Championship: League stage
- Singapore Community Shield: Winners
- Top goalscorer: League: Lennart Thy (28); All: Lennart Thy (34)
- Highest home attendance: 9,737 (v. Sharjah, 18 May 2025)
Home colours	Away colours

The 2024–25 season was Lion City Sailors' 29th consecutive season in the Singapore Premier League and the fifth season since privatising from Home United. They played in the 2024–25 AFC Champions League Two, marking their first appearance in that competition, as well as the 2024–25 ASEAN Club Championship.

== Squad ==
=== Singapore Premier League ===
As of 1 April 2025

Squad No.	Name	Nationality	Date of birth (age)	Previous club	Contract Since	Contract end
Goalkeepers
1	Izwan Mahbud	(Singapore)	14 July 1990 (age 36)	(Singapore) Hougang United	2022	2025
13	Adib Azahari	(Singapore)	9 March 1998 (age 28)	(Singapore) Young Lions	2020	2025
28	Zharfan Rohaizad	(Singapore)	21 February 1997 (age 29)	(Singapore) Tanjong Pagar United	2023	2025
Defenders
4	Toni Datković	(Croatia)	6 November 1993 (age 33)	(Spain) Albacete (S2)	2024	2025
5	Lionel Tan	(Singapore)	5 June 1997 (age 29)	(Singapore) Hougang United	2023	2025
11	Hafiz Nor	(Singapore)	22 August 1988 (age 38)	(Singapore) Warriors FC	2018	2025
14	Hariss Harun (C)	(Singapore)	9 November 1990 (age 35)	(Malaysia) Johor Darul Ta'zim (M1)	2021	2025
18	Obren Kljajić ^{FP U21}	(Bosnia and Herzegovina) (Australia)	18 September 2003 (age 23)	(Australia) Peninsula Power (A2)	2024	2025
19	Zulqarnaen Suzliman	(Singapore)	29 March 1998 (age 28)	(Singapore) Young Lions	2020	2025
20	Sergio Carmona ^{FP U21}	(Spain)	25 July 2004 (age 22)	(Spain) Unión Adarve (S4)	2024	2025
22	Christopher van Huizen	(Singapore)	28 November 1992 (age 33)	(Singapore) Tampines Rovers	2023	2025
26	Bailey Wright	(Australia)	28 July 1992 (age 34)	(England) Sunderland (E2)	2023	2025
29	Diogo Costa ^{FP U21}	(Portugal)	27 July 2003 (age 23)	(Portugal) F.C. Famalicão (P1)	2025	2025
30	Akram Azman	(Singapore)	21 November 2000 (age 25)	(Singapore) Tanjong Pagar United	2025	2025
68	Ali Al Rina ^{FP U21}	(Syria)	10 January 2004 (age 22)	(Syria) Al-Ittihad SC Aleppo (S1)	2025	2025
Midfielders
6	Anumanthan Kumar	(Singapore)	14 July 1994 (age 32)	(Malaysia) Kedah Darul Aman (M1)	2022	2025
8	Rui Pires	(Portugal)	22 March 1998 (age 28)	(Portugal) Paços de Ferreira (P1)	2023	2025
10	Bart Ramselaar	(Netherlands)	29 June 1996 (age 30)	(Netherlands) Utrecht (N1)	2024	2026
15	Song Ui-young	(Singapore)	8 November 1993 (age 33)	(Indonesia) Persebaya Surabaya (I1)	2024	2026
16	Hami Syahin	(Singapore)	16 December 1998 (age 27)	(Singapore) Young Lions	2019	2025
23	Haiqal Pashia	(Singapore)	29 November 1998 (age 27)	(Singapore) Young Lions	2021	2025
Strikers
7	Shawal Anuar	(Singapore)	29 April 1991 (age 35)	(Singapore) Hougang United	2023	2025
9	Lennart Thy	(Germany)	25 February 1992 (age 34)	(Netherlands) PEC Zwolle (N1)	2024	2026
17	Maxime Lestienne	(Belgium)	17 June 1992 (age 34)	(Belgium) Standard Liege (B1)	2022	2025
21	Abdul Rasaq	(Singapore)	16 June 2001 (age 25)	(Singapore) Young Lions	2023	2025
Players on National Service
15	Danish Qayyum	(Singapore)	2 February 2002 (age 24)	(Singapore) Young Lions	2023	2025
30	Nur Adam Abdullah	(Singapore)	13 April 2001 (age 25)	(Singapore) Young Lions	2021	2025
80	Nathan Mao	(Singapore)	26 March 2008 (age 18)	(Singapore) Lion City Sailors U21	2022	2025
Players not registered / de-registered for SPL
Players loaned out during mid-season
3	Bill Mamadou	(Singapore) (Mali)	8 September 2001 (age 25)	(Singapore) Young Lions	2021	2025
77	Muhammad Asis	(Singapore)	4 March 2004 (age 22)	(Singapore) Lion City Sailors U21	2022	2025
Players left during mid-season
27	Adam Swandi	(Singapore)	12 January 1996 (age 30)	(Japan) Albirex Niigata (S)	2019	2025
34	Richairo Zivkovic	(Netherlands) (Curaçao)	15 September 1996 (age 30)	(Netherlands) FC Emmen (N2)	2023	2024

Remarks:
^{FP U21} These players are registered as U21 foreign players.

== Kits ==
Kits using Puma's trademark
Home	Away	Goalkeeper Home ^{1}	Goalkeeper Away ^{2}

== Staff ==
The following list displays the coaching and administrative staff of Lion City Sailors FC:

Management Team

Position	Name
Chairman	(Singapore) Forrest Li
Technical Director	(Serbia) Luka Lalić
Sporting Director	(Singapore) Badri Ghent
General Manager	(Singapore) Tan Li Yu

First Team

Position	Name
Team Manager (SPL)	(Vietnam) Hương Trần
Team Manager (WPL)	(Singapore) Jenny Tan
Head Women Program	(Singapore) Yeong Sheau Shyan
Head Coach	(Serbia) Aleksandar Ranković
Head Coach (Women)	(Singapore) Daniel Ong
Assistant Coach (Women)	(Singapore) Izz Haziq Izan
Assistant Coach	(Serbia) Marko Perović (Serbia) Danilo Tesic
Goalkeeping Coach	(Slovenia) Matija Radikon
Goalkeeping Coach (Assistant)	(Singapore) Chua Lye Heng
Head Strength & Conditioning (S&C) Coach	(Bosnia and Herzegovina) Dzevad Saric
Rehabilitation Coach	(Netherlands) Niels Van Sundert
Sports Scientist	(Netherlands) Mike Kerklaan (Spain) David Conde
Video Analyst	(Spain) Varo Moreno
Match Analyst	(Singapore) Nigel Goh (Singapore) He Qi Xiang
Head of Logistics	(Singapore) Zahir Taufeek

U21 Team

Head Coach (Under-21)	(Singapore) Firdaus Kassim
Asst Coach (Under-21)	(Singapore) Tengku Mushadad
Goalkeeper Coach (Under-21)	(Singapore) Shahril Jantan
Performance Coach (Under-21)	(Germany) Lewin Kösterke
Individual Coach (Under-21)	(Portugal) Rodrigo Costa
Sports Scientist (Under-21)	(Netherlands) Wouter de Vroome
Match Analyst (Under-21)	(Singapore) Gautam Selvamany
Video Analyst (Under-21)	(Spain) Miguel García

Academy

Position	Name
Head of DC Team	(Singapore) Jasni Hatta
Under-17 Head Coach & Academy Coordinator	(Singapore) Ashraf Ariffin
Under-15 Head Coach	(Spain) Albert Arnau Roman
Under-14 Head Coach	(Portugal) Bruno Jeremias
Under-13 Head Coach	(Singapore) Khairil Asyraf
Under-12 Head Coach	(Singapore) Hamqaamal Shah
Under-11 Head Coach	(Portugal) Francisco Couto
Under-10 Head Coach	(Singapore) Kevin Tan
Head of Youth Goalkeeper Coach	(Singapore) Shahril Jantan
Goalkeeping Coach (U17)	(Estonia) Artur Lohmus
Goalkeeping Coach (U15)	(Singapore)
Goalkeeping Coach (U13)	(Singapore) Yeo Jun Guang
Performance Coach (U17)	(Singapore) Farij Samsudi
Performance Coach (U15)	(Brazil) Vital Ribeiro
Performance Coach (U13)	
Individual Coach (U17) & Talent Coordinator	(Portugal) Nuno Pereira
Individual Coach (U15)	(Portugal) Diogo Silva Costa
Individual Coach (U13)	(Portugal) Gonçalo Barbosa
S&C Coach (U17)	
S&C Coach (U15)	
S&C Coach (U13) & Video Analyst (U17)	(Singapore) Leslie Chen
Medical Coordinator	(Estonia) Tarmo Tikk
Sports Trainer	(Singapore) Amanda Cheong
Video Analyst (Development)	(Singapore) Raihan Ismail
Video Analyst (U17)	(Singapore) Zachary Wu
Video Analyst (U15)	(Singapore) Poh Kai Ern
Medical Logistics	(Singapore) Masrezal Bin Mashuri
Nutritionist	(Netherlands) Denise Van Ewijk
Administrative Manager	(Singapore) Clement Choong
Logistics Manager	(Malaysia) Jackson Goh
Multimedia Manager	(Singapore) Adrian Tan
International Relations	(Singapore) Calum Lim
Kitman	(Singapore) Uncle John

== Transfers ==
=== In ===
Pre-season

Position	Player	Transferred from	Team	Ref
GK	(New Zealand) Emmett Connolly	(Australia) Eastern Suburbs	U21	Free
GK	(Singapore) Jarec Ng	Singapore Sports School	U17	Free (Note: Jarec Ng move to BG Tampines after the conclusion of the 2024 SYL season.)
DF	(Croatia) Toni Datković	(Spain) Albacete (S2)	First Team	Free; 1.5 years contract from Feb 2024 till Jun 2025
DF	(Spain) Sergio Carmona	(Spain) AD Unión Adarve (S4)	U21	Free
DF	(Singapore) Iliya Naufal	Singapore Sports School	U17	Free
MF	(Singapore) (South Korea) Song Ui-young	(Indonesia) Persebaya Surabaya	First Team	Free; 2 years contract from Mar 2024 till May 2026
MF	(Netherlands) Bart Ramselaar	(Netherlands) Utrecht (N1)	First Team	€1.5m 2.5 years contract from Feb 2024 till Jun 2026
MF	(Singapore) Harith Danish Irwan	Singapore Sports School	U17	Free
FW	(Germany) Lennart Thy	(Netherlands) PEC Zwolle (N1)	First Team	< €600,000; 2 years contract from May 2024 till May 2026
FW	(Australia) (Bosnia and Herzegovina) Obren Kljajic	(Australia) Peninsula Power	U21	Free
FW	(Australia) (Bosnia and Herzegovina) Novak Kljajic	(Australia) Queensland Lions	U21	Free
FW	(Singapore) (Iran) (England) Kian Ghadessy	(Singapore) Balestier Khalsa U21	U21	Free
FW	(Singapore) Aqil Rifaldy	(Singapore) Tampines Rovers U17	U17	Free (Note: Aqil Rifaldy move to Geylang during mid-season.)

Mid-season

Position	Player	Transferred from	Team	Ref
GK	(Slovenia) Benjamin Žerak	(Slovenia) FC Koper U19	U21	Free; 1.5 years contract from Feb 2024 till Jun 2026
DF	(Singapore) Akram Azman	(Singapore) Tanjong Pagar United	First Team	Undisclosed
MF	(Portugal) Tiago Martins	(Portugal) AVS Futebol SAD U19	U21	Free
FW	(England) Henry Spence	(England) Hull City U18	U21	Free

=== Loan in ===
Mid-season

Position	Player	Transferred from	Team	Ref
DF	(Portugal) Diogo Costa	(Portugal) F.C. Famalicão (P1)	U21	Season loan
DF	(Syria) Ali Al-Rina	(Syria) Al-Ittihad SC Aleppo	U21	Season loan

=== Loan return ===
Preseason

Position	Player	Transferred from	Team	Ref
GK	(Singapore) Rudy Khairullah	(Singapore) Geylang International	First Team	End of loan (Note: Rudy Khairullah released after returning to the team as his contract ended & move back to Geylang permanently.)
DF	(Singapore) Arshad Shamim	(Singapore) Geylang International	First Team	End of loan (Note: Arshad Shamim released after returning to the team as his contract ended & move to Albirex Niigata permanently.)
MF	(Singapore) Justin Hui	N.A.	First team	End of NS (Note: Justin Hui left the club and joined Hougang United.)
DF	(Singapore) Rayyan Ramzdan	(Singapore) SAFSA	U21	End of NS (Note: Rayyan Ramzdan left the club and joined Tanjong Pagar United U21.)
MF	(Singapore) Arsyad Basiron	(Singapore) SAFSA	U21	End of NS (Note: Arsyad Basiron left the club and joined Tanjong Pagar United U21.)
MF	(Singapore) Asis Ijilral	(Singapore) SAFSA	U21	End of NS
MF	(Singapore) Danie Hafiy	(Singapore) SAFSA	U21	End of NS
MF	(Singapore) Yasir Nizamudin	(Singapore) SAFSA	U21	End of NS (Note: Yasir Nizamudin left the club on loan to join Hougang United U21.)
DF	(Singapore) Marcus Mosses	(Singapore) SAFSA	U21	End of NS
MF	(Singapore) Uvayn Kumar	(Singapore) SAFSA	U21	End of NS (Note: Uvayn Kumar left the club on loan to join Tanjong Pagar United U21.)
FW	(Singapore) (Nigeria) Uchenna Eziakor	(Spain) ESC La Liga Academy	U15	End of loan

Mid-season

Position	Player	Transferred from	Team	Ref
GK	(Singapore) Veer Karan Sobti	(Singapore) SAFSA	U21	End of NS (Note: Veer Karan Sobti left the club for further study after returning from NS.)
FW	(Singapore) Khairin Nadim	(Singapore) Young Lions FC	U21	End of NS
DF	(Singapore) Aniq Raushan	(Singapore) SAFSA	U21	End of NS
DF	(Singapore) Danie Hafiy	(Singapore) Hougang United U21	U21	End of loan

=== Out ===
Preseason

Position	Player	Transferred To	Team	Ref
GK	(Singapore) Rudy Khairullah	(Singapore) Geylang International	First Team	Free
GK	(Singapore) Edgar Leo Chin Jee	(Singapore)	U17	Free
DF	(Spain) Súper	(Italy) Sangiustese VP (I5)	First Team	Free
DF	(Brazil) Pedro Henrique	(Brazil) Atlético Goianiense (B1)	First Team	Free. Mutual Termination
DF	(Singapore) Harith Kanadi	(Singapore) Balestier Khalsa	First Team	Free. Mutual Termination
DF	(Singapore) Aiqel Aliman	(Singapore) Tanjong Pagar United U21	U21	Free
DF	(Singapore) Rayyan Ramzdan	(Singapore) Tanjong Pagar United U21	U21	Free
DF	(Singapore) Rizqin Aniq	(Singapore) Tanjong Pagar United U21	U21	Free
DF	(Singapore) Adrian Jaccard	(Singapore) Tampines Rovers U21	U17	Free
DF	(Singapore) Marcus Heng	(Singapore) Tampines Rovers U21	U17	Free
DF	(Australia) (England) Anton Jerga		U17	Free
MF	(Brazil) Diego Lopes	(China) Qingdao Hainiu (C1)	First Team	Free
MF	(Singapore) Arshad Shamim	(Japan) Albirex Niigata (S)	First Team	Free
MF	(Singapore) Rusyaidi Salime	(Singapore) Yishun Sentek Mariners (SFL1)	First Team	Free
MF	(Singapore) Justin Hui	(Singapore) Hougang United	First Team	Free
MF	(Singapore) Anaqi Ismit	(Singapore) Tanjong Pagar United	First Team	Free
MF	(Singapore) Arsyad Basiron	(Singapore) Tanjong Pagar United U21	U21	Free
MF	(Singapore) Ihsan Hadi	(Singapore) Tanjong Pagar United U21	U21	Free
MF	(Singapore) Glenn Ong Jing Jie	(Singapore)	U21	Free
MF	(Singapore) Amir Mirza	(Singapore)	U21	Free
MF	(Singapore) Caden Lim Zheng Yi	Singapore Cricket Club (SFL1)	U21	Free
MF	(Nepal) (Singapore) Aryan Bahadur Chhetri	(Singapore)	U21	Free
MF	(Singapore) Kieran Tan	(Singapore) Tampines Rovers U21	U17	Free
MF	(England) Charlie Taylor	(Singapore) Hougang United U21	U17	Free
MF	(Germany) Julian Eckl	(Germany) Augsburg U15	U17	Free
FW	(Japan) Kodai Tanaka	(Singapore) Balestier Khalsa	First Team	Free
FW	(Netherlands) (Curaçao) Richairo Zivkovic	(Thailand) Bangkok United (T1)	First Team	Free
FW	(Singapore) Zakaria Syari	(Singapore) Police SA	U21	Free
FW	(Belgium) Nils Vandersmissen	(Singapore) Geylang International U21	U21	Free
FW	(Singapore) Matin Ilhan	(Portugal) Salgueiros (P3)	U21	Free
FW	(Japan) Tyler Kawauchi	(Japan) Urawa Red Diamonds U15	U17	Free
FW	(Singapore) Aqil Rifaldy	(Singapore) Geylang International U17	U17	Free

Mid-season

Position	Player	Transferred To	Team	Ref
GK	(Cook Islands) (New Zealand) Emmett Connolly		U21	Free
GK	(Singapore) (Hong Kong) (Pakistan) Veer Karan Sobti	(United States) College of William & Mary	U21	Free
DF	(Singapore) Ryan Vishal	(Singapore) Young Lions U21	U17	Free
DF	(Singapore) (Nigeria) Levi Faris	(Singapore) Hougang United U21	U17	Free
DF	(Singapore) Iman Haziq	(Singapore) Hougang United U21	U17	Free
MF	(Singapore) Adam Swandi	Retired	First Team	N.A.
MF	(Singapore) Rae Peh Jun Wen	(Singapore) Tampines Rovers U21	U21	Free
MF	(Australia) (Japan) Thorsten Takashi Cross	(Singapore) Tanjong Pagar United U21	U17	Free
MF	(Singapore) Ikmal Hazlan	(Singapore) Young Lions U21	U17	Free
FW	(Singapore) Khairin Nadim	(Portugal) F.C. Vizela U23	U21	Free; 1.5 years contract from Feb 2025 till Jun 2026
FW	(Australia) (Bosnia and Herzegovina) Novak Kljajic	(Serbia) FK Radnički Niš	U21	Free
FW	(Switzerland) (Singapore) Hugo Foemli	(Switzerland) Servette U18	U17	Free

Post-season

Position	Player	Transferred To	Team	Ref
DF	(Spain) Sergio Carmona	(Spain)	First Team	Free
MF	(Portugal) Rui Pires	(Portugal)	First Team	Free

=== Loan out ===
Preseason

Position	Player	Transferred to	Team	Ref
GK	(Singapore) Veer Karan Sobti	(Singapore)	U21	On National Service until July 2024
DF	(Singapore) Aniq Raushan	(Singapore) SAFSA	U21	On National Service until January 2025
FW	(Singapore) Khairin Nadim	(Singapore)	U21	On National Service until January 2025 (Note: Khairin Nadim loaned to Young lions while serving NS)
DF	(Singapore) Nur Adam Abdullah	(Singapore)	First team	On national service until September 2025 (Note: Nur Adam loaned to Young lions while serving NS)
MF	(Singapore) Danish Qayyum	(Singapore)	First team	On national service until September 2025 (Note: Danish Qayyum loaned to Young lions while serving NS)
MF	(Singapore) Jonan Tan En Yuan	(Singapore) SAFSA	U21	On national service until October 2025
FW	(Singapore) (England) Ilyasin Zayan	(Singapore)	U21	On national service until December 2025
DF	(Singapore) Aniq Tiryaq	(Singapore) SAFSA	U21	On national service until April 2026
MF	(Singapore) Yazid Rais	(Singapore) SAFSA	U21	On national service until April 2026
FW	(Singapore) Qaisy Noranzor	(Singapore) SAFSA	U21	On national service until April 2026
GK	(Singapore) Issac Goh Jun Yang	(Singapore) SAFSA	U21	On national service until May 2026
DF	(Singapore) Kieran Aryan Azhari	(Singapore) SAFSA	U21	On national service until May 2026
MF	(Singapore) Caden Lim Zheng Yi	(Singapore) SAFSA	U21	On national service until May 2026
DF	(Singapore) Aqil Khusni	(Singapore) SAFSA	U21	On national service until July 2026
DF	(Singapore) Danie Hafiy	(Singapore) Hougang United U21	U21	Season loan till December 2024
MF	(Singapore) Yasir Nizamudin	(Singapore) Hougang United U21	U21	Season loan
MF	(Singapore) Uvayn Kumar	(Singapore) Tanjong Pagar United U21	U21	Season loan
FW	(Singapore) (Nigeria) Uchenna Eziakor	(Spain) Rayo Ciudad Alcobendas Academy	U15	Season loan

Mid-season

Position	Player	Transferred To	Team	Ref
DF	(Singapore) (Mali) Bill Mamadou	(Singapore) Young Lions	First team	Season loan till May 2025
DF	(Singapore) Marcus Mosses	(Singapore) Tanjong Pagar United U21	U21	Season loan till May 2025
MF	(Singapore) Asis Ijilral	(Portugal) C.F. Estrela da Amadora (P1)	U21	Season loan (Note: Asis will primarily train and play with Estrela’s B Team, while also turning out for the club’s Under-23 side.)
MF	(Singapore) Jonan Tan	(Portugal) C.F. Estrela da Amadora (P1)	U21	Season loan
FW	(Singapore) (Iran) (England) Kian Ghadessy	(Singapore)	U21	On national service until October 2026
FW	(Singapore) Izrafil Yusof	(Singapore) Tanjong Pagar United U21	U21	Season loan until May 2025
MF	(Singapore) Nathan Mao	(Singapore) SAFSA	U21	On national service until March 2027
DF	(Singapore) Muhammad Fadly	(Singapore) SAFSA	U21	On national service until April 2027
DF	(Singapore) Idzham Eszuan	(Singapore) SAFSA	U21	On national service until April 2027
DF	(Singapore) Harith Luth Harith	(Singapore) SAFSA	U21	On national service until April 2027

=== Contract extensions ===
First Team

Position	Player	Ref
GK	(Singapore) Adib Hakim	2 years from Jan-24 to Dec-25
GK	(Singapore) Izwan Mahbud	2 years from Jan-24 to Dec-25
GK	(Singapore) Zharfan Rohaizad	2 years from Jan-23 to Dec-24
DF	(Singapore) Hariss Harun	3.5 years from 2021 till 2024
DF	(Singapore) Zulqarnaen Suzliman	2 years from Jan-24 till Dec-25
DF	(Singapore) Hafiz Nor	2 years from Jan-24 till Dec-25
DF	(Australia) Bailey Wright	2 years from Jun-2023 till Jun-2025; Include 1 year option
DF	(Singapore) Lionel Tan	2 years from Jan-23 to Dec-24
DF	(Singapore) Christopher van Huizen	2 years from Jan-23 to Dec-24
MF	(Portugal) Rui Pires	2 years from Jun-2023 till Jun-2025
MF	(Singapore) Anumanthan Kumar	3 years from 2022 till 2024
MF	(Singapore) Hami Syahin	2 years from Jan-24 till Dec-25
MF	(Singapore) Adam Swandi	2 years from Jan-24 till Dec-25
FW	(Netherlands) (Curaçao) Richairo Zivkovic	1-year from Jun-2023 till Jun-2024
FW	(Belgium) Maxime Lestienne	2 years from Jan-24 till Dec-25
FW	(Singapore) Shawal Anuar	2 years from Jan-24 till Dec-25
FW	(Singapore) Haiqal Pashia	2 years from Jan-23 to Dec-24
FW	(Singapore) (Nigeria) Abdul Rasaq Akeem	2 years from Jan-23 to Dec-24

U21

Position	Player	Ref
GK	(Singapore) Veer Karan Sobti	4 years contract from 2022 till 2025

== Friendly ==
=== Pre-season ===
Win Draw Loss

2024 SPL Interim Tournament – 23 Feb to 21 Apr

23 February 2024 1	Lion City Sailors (Singapore)	0–3	(Singapore) Hougang United	Bishan
			Ajay Robson 12'; Iryan Fandi 28'; Shodai Yokoyama 60'	Stadium: Bishan Stadium

3 March 2024 2	Lion City Sailors (Singapore)	1–3	(Japan) Albirex Niigata (S)	Jalan Besar
	Nathan Mao 52' (pen.)		Haziq Kamarudin 6'; Shuhei Hoshino 12'; Koki Kawachi 79'	Stadium: Jalan Besar Stadium

8 March 2024 3	Lion City Sailors (Singapore)	1–3	(Singapore) Balestier Khalsa	Bishan
	Shawal Anuar 54'		Bill Mamadou 9' (o.g.); Kodai Tanaka 17'; Amiruldin Asraf 85'	Stadium: Bishan Stadium

13 April 2024 4	Lion City Sailors (Singapore)	1–0	(Singapore) Geylang International	Tampines
	Sergio Carmona 18'			Stadium: Our Tampines Hub

21 April 2024 5	Lion City Sailors (Singapore)	1–13	(Singapore) BG Tampines Rovers	Bishan
			Seia Kunori 1', 8'; Seia Kunori 6'; Boris Kopitović 16', 18', 32', 45'; Shah Shahiran 55'; Thitipat Ekarunpong 71', 78'; Caelan Cheong 76'; Taufik Suparno 76'	Stadium: Bishan Stadium

LCS-JDT Double Header

4 April 2024 1	Lion City Sailors (Singapore)	1–2	(Malaysia) Johor Darul Ta'zim	Bishan
	Maxime Lestienne 37'		Nicolao Dumitru 9'; Romel Morales 24'	Stadium: Bishan Stadium; Attendance: 2,477; Referee: Mohd Taqi

8 April 2024 2	Johor Darul Ta'zim (Malaysia)	4–0	(Singapore) Lion City Sailors	Johor
	Fernando Forestieri 41' (pen.); Juan Muniz 45', 67'; Heberty 52'			Stadium: Sultan Ibrahim Stadium; Referee: Tuan Mohd Yaasin

Tour of Thailand – 15 to 25 Apr

16 April 2024 1	Lion City Sailors (Singapore)	2–1	(Thailand) Police Tero (T1)	Pathum Thani
	Shawal Anuar			Stadium: Yamaoka Hanasaka Football Academy

20 April 2024 2	Lion City Sailors (Singapore)	3–1	(Thailand) Samut Sakhon City (T3)	Pathum Thani
	Shawal Anuar			Stadium: Yamaoka Hanasaka Football Academy

=== Mid-season ===
First Team

16 November 2024 1	Johor Darul Ta'zim (Malaysia)	1–0	(Singapore) Lion City Sailors	Johor
	Shahrul Saad 88'			Stadium: Sultan Ibrahim Stadium

4 Jan 2025 1	Lion City Sailors (Singapore)	–	(Hong Kong) Kitchee SC	Jalan Besar
				Stadium: Jalan Besar Stadium

== Team statistics ==
=== Appearances and goals (LCS) ===
As of 31 May 2025

No.	Pos.	Player	SPL		Singapore Cup		Community Shield		AFC Champions League Two (Note: The first leg of the match between Sanfrecce Hiroshima and Lion City Sailors are not counted in the stats as the match was forfeited by the AFC. Lion City Sailors were awarded a 0–3 victory after Sanfrecce Hiroshima fielded an ineligible player. The score on the field was originally a 6–1 win by Sanfrecce Hiroshima.)		AFF Shopee Cup		Total	
No.	Pos.	Player	Apps.	Goals	Apps.	Goals	Apps.	Goals	Apps.	Goals	Apps.	Goals	Apps.	Goals
1	GK	(Singapore) Izwan Mahbud	22	0	0	0	0	0	12	0	4	0	38	0
4	DF	(Croatia) Toni Datković	27	4	6	2	1	0	12	1	5	0	51	7
5	DF	(Singapore) Lionel Tan	21+4	1	6+1	0	1	0	8+4	0	3	0	48	1
6	MF	(Singapore) Anumanthan Kumar	7+14	0	2+1	0	0+1	0	0+4	0	2+3	0	34	0
7	FW	(Singapore) Shawal Anuar	24+6	18	4+1	0	1	1	7+4	7	1+3	0	51	26
8	MF	(Portugal) Rui Pires	13+2	0	6	0	0	0	10	0	2	0	33	0
9	FW	(Germany) Lennart Thy	23+3	28	3+1	3	0	0	9+3	3	3+1	0	46	34
10	MF	(Netherlands) Bart Ramselaar	17+3	10	6	6	1	0	9+1	3	5	0	42	19
11	FW	(Singapore) Hafiz Nor	6+21	0	1+3	0	0	0	1+2	0	1+3	0	38	0
13	GK	(Singapore) Adib Azahari	1	0	0	0	0	0	0	0	0	0	1	0
14	DF	(Singapore) Hariss Harun	18+10	0	1+5	0	1	0	7+3	1	3+2	0	50	1
15	MF	(Singapore) (South Korea) Song Ui-young	17+8	6	7	1	1	0	9+1	5	3+2	0	48	12
16	MF	(Singapore) Hami Syahin	23+4	0	4+3	0	1	0	9+1	0	5	0	50	0
17	FW	(Belgium) Maxime Lestienne	24+3	14	3	1	1	1	11+1	5	5	1	48	22
18	FW	(Bosnia and Herzegovina) (Australia) Obren Kljajić	10+2	1	1	0	1	0	0+3	0	0	0	17	1
19	DF	(Singapore) Zulqarnaen Suzliman	2	0	0	0	0	0	0	0	0	0	2	0
20	DF	(Spain) Sergio Carmona	10+2	2	2	0	0+1	0	0+2	0	2+2	0	21	2
21	FW	(Singapore) (Nigeria) Abdul Rasaq	6+13	2	1+6	2	0	0	0+4	0	1+4	0	35	4
22	DF	(Singapore) Christopher van Huizen	19+11	1	2+3	0	0+1	0	10	0	4+1	0	51	1
23	FW	(Singapore) Haiqal Pashia	3+12	1	0+1	0	0	0	0	0	0+2	0	18	1
26	DF	(Australia) Bailey Wright	28	4	6	1	1	0	12	1	5	1	52	7
28	GK	(Singapore) Zharfan Rohaizad	9	0	7	0	1	0	0+1	0	1	0	19	0
29	DF	(Portugal) Diogo Costa	9	0	5	1	0	0	6	0	0	0	20	1
30	DF	(Singapore) Akram Azman	3+5	0	1+3	1	0	0	0+1	0	0	0	13	1
57	DF	(Brazil) Enrico Walmrath Silveira	0+2	0	0	0	0	0	0	0	0	0	2	0
61	MF	(Singapore) Andy Reefqy	0+2	0	0	0	0	0	0	0	0	0	2	0
62	MF	(Republic of Ireland) (Japan) Joshua Little	1	0	0	0	0	0	0	0	0	0	1	0
68	DF	(Syria) Ali Al Rina	3	0	1	0	0	0	0+2	0	0	0	6	0
75	FW	(England) Henry Spence	0+2	0	0	0	0	0	0	0	0	0	2	0
78	DF	(Singapore) Danie Hafiy	0+1	0	0	0	0	0	0	0	0	0	1	0
Players featured on a match for LCS, but left the club mid-season, either permanently or on loan transfer
3	DF	(Singapore) (Mali) Bill Mamadou	2+3	0	0	0	0	0	0+2	0	1	0	8	0
27	MF	(Singapore) Adam Swandi	4+5	3	0	0	0+1	0	0	0	0	0	10	3
34	FW	(Netherlands) (Curaçao) Richairo Zivkovic	0	0	0	0	0	0	0	0	0	0	0	0
71	FW	(Singapore) (Iran) (England) Kian Ghadessy	0+1	0	0	0	0	0	0	0	0	0	1	0
77	MF	(Singapore) Nur Muhammad Asis	0+2	0	0	0	0	0	0	0	0	0	2	0
80	FW	(Singapore) Nathan Mao Zhi Xuan	0	0	2+2	0	0	0	0	0	0	0	4	0

== Competitions ==
=== Overview ===
Competition	Record							
Competition	P	W	D	L	GF	GA	GD	Win %
Singapore Premier League	32	22	6	4	96	32	+64	68.75
Singapore Cup	7	6	1	0	18	6	+12	85.71
Community Shield	1	1	0	0	2	0	+2	100.00
AFC Champions League Two	13	7	2	4	28	16	+12	53.85
ASEAN Club Championship	5	1	1	3	2	10	−8	20.00
Total	58	37	10	11	146	64	+82	63.79

Results summary (SPL)

Overall								Home						Away					
Pld	W	D	L	GF	GA	GD	Pts	W	D	L	GF	GA	GD	W	D	L	GF	GA	GD
0	0	0	0	0	0	0	0	0	0	0	0	0	0	0	0	0	0	0	0

=== Community Shield ===
4 May 2024 Community Shield	Albirex Niigata (S) (Japan)	0–2	(Singapore) Lion City Sailors	Jalan Besar
	Shuhei Hoshino (yellow card) 40'; Gareth Low (yellow card) 82'		Shawal Anuar 42' (yellow card) 60'; Maxime Lestienne 82'; Aleksandar Ranković (yellow card) 52'	Stadium: Jalan Besar Stadium; Referee: Clarence Leow

=== Singapore Premier League ===
Win Draw Loss

10 May 2024 1	Hougang United (Singapore)	1–4	(Singapore) Lion City Sailors	Jalan Besar
	Hazzuwan Halim 34' (penalty missed) 34		Bart Ramselaar 23'; Shawal Anuar 25'; Adam Swandi 58'; Obren Kljajic 88' (yellow card) 21'	Stadium: Jalan Besar Stadium; Referee: Andrea Verolino; Man of the Match: (Singapore) Shawal Anuar

18 May 2024 2	Lion City Sailors (Singapore)	3–1	(Singapore) Young Lions	Bishan
	Maxime Lestienne 18'; Shawal Anuar 24'; Bart Ramselaar 57'; Bailey Wright (red card) 45+3'		Farhan Zulkifli 64'; Fairuz Fazli Koh (yellow card) 15'; Raoul Suhaimi (yellow card) 59'	Stadium: Bishan Stadium; Referee: Hilmi Fuad; Man of the Match: (Netherlands) Bart Ramselaar

18 June 2024 3 (Rescheduled)	DPMM (Brunei)	0–2	(Singapore) Lion City Sailors	Jalan Besar
	Miguel Oliveira (yellow card) 24'; Hanif Farhan Azman (yellow card) 80'		Shawal Anuar 86'; Maxime Lestienne 90+5'; Hami Syahin (yellow card) 24'; Lionel Tan (yellow card) 56'; Hariss Harun (yellow card) 60'	Stadium: Jalan Besar Stadium (Note: Match rescheduled and location changed due to technical issues in Hassanal Bolkiah National Stadium); Referee: Muhammad Taqi; Man of the Match: (Belgium) Maxime Lestienne

23 June 2024 4	Lion City Sailors (Singapore)	7–1	(Japan) Albirex Niigata (S)	Bishan
	Shawal Anuar 9'; Lennart Thy 31'; Bailey Wright 55'; Song Ui-young 60'; Bart Ramselaar 64', 83' (yellow card) 38'; Maxime Lestienne 68'		Shuhei Hoshino 21'	Stadium: Bishan Stadium; Referee: Andrea Verolino; Man of the Match: (Netherlands) Bart Ramselaar

28 June 2024 5	Geylang International (Singapore)	1–1	(Singapore) Lion City Sailors	Jalan Besar
	Vincent Bezecourt 13'; Joshua Pereira (yellow card) 45'; Hairul Syirhan (yellow card) 90+2'; Ahmad Syahir (yellow card) 90+4'		Maxime Lestienne 58'; Hami Syahin (yellow card) 3'; Toni Datković (yellow card) 34'; Bailey Wright (yellow card) 80'	Stadium: Jalan Besar Stadium; Attendance: 1,085; Referee: Taufik Thana; Man of the Match: (France) Vincent Bezecourt

7 July 2024 6	Lion City Sailors (Singapore)	3–0	(Singapore) Tanjong Pagar United	Bishan
	Maxime Lestienne 2'; Adam Swandi 40'; Bailey Wright 86'; Anumanthan Kumar (yellow card) 63'		Akram Azman (yellow card) 90+2'	Stadium: Bishan Stadium; Referee: Jansen Foo; Man of the Match: (Singapore) Adam Swandi

13 July 2024 7	Balestier Khalsa (Singapore)	2–4	(Singapore) Lion City Sailors	Bishan
	Ismail Sassi 68', 83'; Tajeli Salamat (yellow card) 38'; Madhu Mohana (yellow card) 72'; Riku Fukashiro (yellow card) 88'		Bart Ramselaar 60'; Toni Datković 81' (yellow card) 90+6'; Maxime Lestienne 90+1' (pen.), 90+4'; Christopher van Huizen (yellow card) 55'; Hami Syahin (yellow card) 56'; Hariss Harun (yellow card) 66'	Stadium: Bishan Stadium; Referee: Andrea Verolino; Man of the Match: (Belgium) Maxime Lestienne

18 July 2024 8	Lion City Sailors (Singapore)	0–5	(Singapore) BG Tampines Rovers	Bishan
			Boris Kopitović 45+1', 47' (yellow card) 7'; Glenn Kweh 45+4'; Faris Ramli 50'; Irfan Najeeb 57'; Amirul Adli (yellow card) 35'	Stadium: Bishan Stadium; Referee: Farhan Mohd; Man of the Match: (Singapore) Irfan Najeeb

22 July 2024 9	Young Lions (Singapore)	0–6	(Singapore) Lion City Sailors	Bishan
	Ryaan Sanizal (yellow card) 27'		Shawal Anuar 2', 32'; Maxime Lestienne 55'; Song Ui-young 64'; Lennart Thy 69'; Haiqal Pashia 90+3'	Stadium: Bishan Stadium; Referee: Zulfiqar Bin Mustaffa; Man of the Match: (Singapore) Shawal Anuar

28 July 2024 10	Lion City Sailors (Singapore)	7–2	(Singapore) Hougang United	Bishan
	Bailey Wright 12'; Song Ui-young 20'; Shawal Anuar 45+1'; Toni Datković 52'; Maxime Lestienne 55' (pen.); Lennart Thy 61', 80'; Lionel Tan (yellow card) 58'		Stjepan Plazonja 10'; Faris Hasić (yellow card) 73'	Stadium: Bishan Stadium; Referee: Clarence Leow; Man of the Match: (Germany) Lennart Thy

3 August 2024 11	Lion City Sailors (Singapore)	3–0	(Brunei) DPMM	Bishan
	Lennart Thy 20', 69'; Shawal Anuar 50'		Farshad Noor (yellow card) 30'; Nurikhwan Othman (yellow card) 41'	Stadium: Bishan Stadium; Referee: Zulfiqar Bin Mustaffa; Man of the Match: (Germany) Lennart Thy

25 August 2024 12	Albirex Niigata (S) (Japan)	3–1	(Singapore) Lion City Sailors	Jurong East
	Arya Igami Tarhani 10'; Shingo Nakano 81' (pen.), 88'; Ho Wai Loon (yellow card) 87'; Gareth Low (yellow card) 90+1'; Yojiro Takahagi (yellow card) 90+5'		Lennart Thy 74'; Song Ui-young (yellow card) 90+1'	Stadium: Jurong East Stadium; Referee: Muhammad Taqi; Man of the Match: (Japan) Shingo Nakano

30 August 2024 13	Lion City Sailors (Singapore)	2–2	(Singapore) Geylang International	Bishan
	Bart Ramselaar 49'; Maxime Lestienne 65'; Song Ui-young (yellow card) 32'; Hami Syahin (yellow card) 61'; Lennart Thy (yellow card) 82'		Tomoyuki Doi 49', 85' (pen.); Shakir Hamzah (yellow card) 40'; Rio Sakuma (yellow card) 88'	Stadium: Bishan Stadium; Referee: Clarence Leow; Man of the Match: (Belgium) Maxime Lestienne

14 September 2024 14	Tanjong Pagar United (Singapore)	0–6	(Singapore) Lion City Sailors	Jurong East
	Faizal Roslan (yellow card) 45'; Timur Talipov (red card) 50'; Rizqin Aniq (yellow card) 90+1'		Abdul Rasaq 32' (pen.); Adam Swandi 36'; Shawal Anuar 37'; Bart Ramselaar 55'; Lennart Thy 77', 82'; Bill Mamadou (yellow card) 7'; Anumanthan Kumar (red card) 63'	Stadium: Jurong East Stadium; Referee: Farhan Mohd; Man of the Match: (Germany) Lennart Thy

22 September 2024 15	Lion City Sailors (Singapore)	3–1	(Singapore) Balestier Khalsa	Bishan
	Abdul Rasaq 11'; Christopher van Huizen 26'; Sergio Carmona 72'; Lionel Tan (yellow card) 89'		Jordan Emaviwe 68'	Stadium: Bishan Stadium; Referee: Taufik Thana; Man of the Match: (Spain) Sergio Carmona

29 September 2024 16	BG Tampines Rovers (Singapore)	2–2	(Singapore) Lion City Sailors	Jalan Besar
	Faris Ramli 48'; Boris Kopitović 55' (penalty missed) 40		Shawal Anuar 8', 88'; Song Ui-young (yellow card) 83'	Stadium: Jalan Besar Stadium; Referee: Ahmad A'Qashah; Man of the Match: (Singapore) Shawal Anuar

19 October 2024 17	Lion City Sailors (Singapore)	3–1	(Singapore) Hougang United	Bishan
	Song Ui-young 15' (yellow card) 45+1'; Lennart Thy 17', 68'; Lionel Tan (yellow card) 47'; Hariss Harun (yellow card) 55'; Aleksandar Ranković (yellow card) 55'		Dejan Račić 5'; Ensar Brunčević (yellow card) 53'; Nazrul Nazari (yellow card) 60'	Stadium: Bishan Stadium; Referee: Jansen Foo; Man of the Match: (Germany) Lennart Thy

30 April 2025 18 (Rescheduled)	Lion City Sailors (Singapore)	3–1	(Singapore) Young Lions	Tampines
	Bart Ramselaar 13'; Shawal Anuar 45+2'; Maxime Lestienne 77'; Lionel Tan (yellow card) 16'; Ali Al Rina (yellow card) 32'; Diogo Costa (yellow card) 46'		Jun Kobayashi 19'; Andrew Aw (yellow card) 39'; Fathullah Rahmat (yellow card) 75'	Stadium: Our Tampines Hub (Note: Match rescheduled and location changed to Our Tampines Hub due to General Election 2025 and potential closures of selected ActiveSG facilities, including stadiums that are typically used for SPL fixtures); Referee: Farhan Mohd; Man of the Match: (Singapore) Izwan Mahbud

13 January 2025 19 (Rescheduled)	DPMM (Brunei)	2–4	(Singapore) Lion City Sailors	Bandar Seri Begawan
	Azwan Ali Rahman 4'; Miguel Oliveira 57'; Yura Indera Putera Yunos (yellow card) 67'; Hariz Danial Khallidden (yellow card) 90+4'		Shawal Anuar 18', 69'; Lennart Thy 30', 64'; Sergio Carmona (yellow card) 76'	Stadium: Hassanal Bolkiah National Stadium; Referee: Andrea Verolino; Man of the Match: (Germany) Lennart Thy

17 January 2025 20	Lion City Sailors (Singapore)	6–0	(Japan) Albirex Niigata (S)	Bishan
	Shawal Anuar 16'; Lennart Thy 32', 52'; Bart Ramselaar 36'; Song Ui-young 45+1' (yellow card) 27'; Sergio Carmona 66'			Stadium: Bishan Stadium; Referee: Jansen Foo; Man of the Match: (Germany) Lennart Thy

26 January 2025 21	Geylang International (Singapore)	1–2	(Singapore) Lion City Sailors	Jalan Besar
	Vincent Bezecourt 13'; Naqiuddin Eunos (yellow card) 38'; Joshua Pereira (yellow card) 72'		Toni Datković 29'; Shawal Anuar 56' (yellow card) 90+3'; Diogo Costa (yellow card) 38'; Hami Syahin (yellow card) 62'; Izwan Mahbud (yellow card) 90+5'	Stadium: Jalan Besar Stadium; Referee: Muhammad Taqi; Man of the Match: (Singapore) Shawal Anuar

9 February 2025 22 (Rescheduled)	Lion City Sailors (Singapore)	4–1	(Singapore) Tanjong Pagar United	Bishan
	Lennart Thy 11', 59', 69'; Bailey Wright 24'		Tomoki Wada 89'; Faizal Roslan (yellow card) 22' (yellow-red card) 74'	Stadium: Bishan Stadium; Referee: Andrea Verolino; Man of the Match: (Germany) Lennart Thy

23 February 2025 23	Balestier Khalsa (Singapore)	1–5	(Singapore) Lion City Sailors	Bishan
	Kodai Tanaka 87'; Fudhil I’yadh (red card) 37'; Darren Teh (yellow card) 49'; Riku Fukashiro (yellow card) 73'; Jared Gallagher (yellow card) 83'		Lennart Thy 3', 45+2', 49', 72'; Maxime Lestienne 30'; Bailey Wright (yellow card) 45+5'; Rui Pires (yellow card) 46'; Hafiz Nor (yellow card) 87'	Stadium: Bishan Stadium; Referee: Jansen Foo; Man of the Match: (Germany) Lennart Thy

26 February 2025 24	Lion City Sailors (Singapore)	1–0	(Singapore) BG Tampines Rovers	Bishan
	Lionel Tan 81'; Maxime Lestienne (yellow card) 90+1'			Stadium: Bishan Stadium; Referee: Farhan Mohd; Man of the Match: (Portugal) Rui Pires

9 March 2025 25	Hougang United (Singapore)	1–1	(Singapore) Lion City Sailors	Jalan Besar
	Shodai Yokoyama 27'; Stjepan Plazonja (yellow card) 52'; Jordan Vestering (yellow card) 82'		Maxime Lestienne 20'; Akram Azman (yellow card) 67'	Stadium: Jalan Besar Stadium; Referee: Ahmad A'Qashah; Man of the Match: (Croatia) Stjepan Plazonja

6 April 2025 26	Young Lions (Singapore)	0–8	(Singapore) Lion City Sailors	Jalan Besar
	Umayr Sujuandy (red card) 25'		Ikram Mikhail Mustaqim 11' (o.g.); Bart Ramselaar 14'; Lennart Thy 25', 44', 60', 90', 90+1'; Song Ui-young 58'; Toni Datković (yellow card) 35'	Stadium: Jalan Besar Stadium; Referee: Syarqawi Buhari; Man of the Match: (Germany) Lennart Thy

12 April 2025 27 (Rescheduled)	Lion City Sailors (Singapore)	0–0	(Brunei) DPMM	Bishan
	Rui Pires (yellow card) 89'		Syafiq Safiuddin Abdul Shariff (yellow card) 61'; Gabriel Gama (yellow card) 83'	Stadium: Bishan Stadium; Referee: Clarence Leow; Man of the Match: (North Macedonia) Kristijan Naumovski

25 April 2025 28	Albirex Niigata (S) (Japan)	0–2	(Singapore) Lion City Sailors	Tampines
	Shuhei Hoshino (yellow card) 49'; Koki Kawachi (yellow card) 82'		Toni Datković 25'; Shawal Anuar 77'; Hariss Harun (yellow card) 69'	Stadium: Our Tampines Hub (Note: Location changed to Our Tampines Hub due to General Election 2025 and potential closures of selected ActiveSG facilities, including stadiums that are typically used for SPL fixtures); Referee: Ahmad A'Qashah; Man of the Match: (Belgium) Maxime Lestienne

4 May 2025 29 (Rescheduled)	Lion City Sailors (Singapore)	2–3	(Singapore) Geylang International	Tampines
	Lennart Thy 36'; Shawal Anuar 38'; Hami Syahin (yellow card) 47'; Rui Pires (yellow card) 70'		Tomoyuki Doi 44', 85'; Ryoya Taniguchi 71'; Naqiuddin Eunos (yellow card) 76'; Vincent Bezecourt (yellow card) 77'; Shakir Hamzah (yellow card) 80'; Iqbal Hussain (yellow card) 90+6'	Stadium: Our Tampines Hub (Note: Match rescheduled and location changed to Our Tampines Hub due to General Election 2025 and potential closures of selected ActiveSG facilities, including stadiums that are typically used for SPL fixtures); Referee: Andrea Verolino; Man of the Match: (Japan) Tomoyuki Doi

10 May 2025 30	Tanjong Pagar United (Singapore)	0–1	(Singapore) Lion City Sailors	Jurong East
	Azim Akbar (yellow card) 45+5'; Rezza Rezky (yellow card) 66'		Maxime Lestienne 20' (pen.); Shawal Anuar (yellow card) 58'; Toni Datković (yellow card) 85'	Stadium: Jurong East Stadium; Referee: Oswind Suriya; Man of the Match: (Canada) Matt Silva

14 May 2025 31 (Rescheduled)	Lion City Sailors (Singapore)	0–1	(Singapore) Balestier Khalsa	Jalan Besar
	Bart Ramselaar (yellow card) 25'; Ali Al Rina (yellow card) 29'; Akram Azman (yellow card) 90+3'		Kodai Tanaka 31' (pen.); Alen Kozar (yellow card) 46'	Stadium: Jalan Besar Stadium (Note: Match rescheduled and location changed to Jalan Besar Stadium due to upgrading of Bishan Stadium for the AFC Champions League 2 Final); Referee: Andrea Verolino; Man of the Match: (Japan) Kodai Tanaka

24 May 2025 32	BG Tampines Rovers (Singapore)	0–0	(Singapore) Lion City Sailors	Jalan Besar
			Zulqarnaen Suzliman (yellow card) 5'; Abdul Rasaq (yellow card) 64'	Stadium: Jalan Besar Stadium; Referee: Muhammad Taqi; Man of the Match: (Singapore) Zharfan Rohaizad

Pos	Team	Pld	W	D	L	GF	GA	GD	Pts	Qualification or relegation
1	Lion City Sailors (C)	32	22	6	4	96	32	+64	72	Qualification for Champions League Two group stage & ASEAN Club Championship (Note: Since the winners of the 2024–25 Singapore Cup, Lion City Sailors, had already qualified for the AFC Champions League Two and ASEAN Club Championship, the spot given to the Singapore Cup winners (Champions League Two) was passed to the second-placed team.)
2	BG Tampines Rovers	32	19	7	6	84	37	+47	64	Qualification for Champions League Two group stage & ASEAN Club Championship
3	Geylang International	32	15	9	8	97	64	+33	54	
4	Balestier Khalsa	32	14	6	12	84	80	+4	48	
5	DPMM (Note: Ineligible for AFC competition spots)	32	12	8	12	54	61	−7	44	Transferred to the 2025–26 Malaysia Super League post-season
6	Albirex Niigata (S)	32	13	3	16	55	71	−16	42	
7	Hougang United	32	7	10	15	61	76	−15	31	
8	Young Lions	32	7	8	17	47	89	−42	29	
9	Tanjong Pagar United	32	3	7	22	35	103	−68	16	

Updated to match(es) played on 25 May 2025. Source: Singapore Premier League
Rules for classification: 1) points; 2) goal difference; 3) number of goals scored; 4) number of wins
(C) Champions

=== Singapore Cup ===
Pos	Team	Pld	W	D	L	GF	GA	GD	Pts	Qualification
1	Lion City Sailors	4	3	1	0	12	4	+8	10	Semi-finals
2	BG Pathum United	4	2	2	0	7	5	+2	8	Semi-finals
3	Balestier Khalsa	4	2	0	2	10	10	0	6	
4	Tanjong Pagar United	4	1	0	3	3	9	−6	3	
5	Geylang International	4	0	1	3	7	11	−4	1	

Source: FAS

Win Draw Loss

16 February 2025 Group match 1	Lion City Sailors (Singapore)	4–1	(Singapore) Tanjong Pagar United	Bishan
	Bart Ramselaar 26', 47'; Akram Azman 78'; Abdul Rasaq 88'	Report	Faizal Roslan 70'; Raihan Rahman (yellow card) 35'	Stadium: Bishan Stadium; Referee: Zulfiqar Mustaffa

27 March 2025 Group match 2 (Rescheduled)	Geylang International (Singapore)	1–3	(Singapore) Lion City Sailors	Jalan Besar
	Tomoyuki Doi 55' (pen.); Shakir Hamzah (yellow card) 26'	Report	Lennart Thy 3', 67', 75'; Anumanthan Kumar (yellow card) 30'; Song Ui-young (yellow card) 39'	Stadium: Jalan Besar Stadium; Referee: Clarence Leow

16 March 2025 Group match 3	Lion City Sailors (Singapore)	4–1	(Singapore) Balestier Khalsa	Bishan
	Song Ui-young 7'; Bart Ramselaar 25', 88', 90+2'	Report	Kodai Tanaka 52'	Stadium: Bishan Stadium; Referee: Zulfiqar Mustaffa

30 March 2025 Group match 4	BG Pathum United (Thailand)	1–1	(Singapore) Lion City Sailors	Jalan Besar
	Thanet Suknate 90+5'; Hwang Myung-hyun (yellow card) 22'	Report	Song Ui-young (red card) 6'; Abdul Rasaq 35' (yellow card) 15'; Akram Azman (yellow card) 83'	Stadium: Jalan Besar Stadium; Referee: Jansen Foo

21 May 2025 Semi Final Leg 1 (Rescheduled)	DPMM FC (Brunei)	2–3	(Singapore) Lion City Sailors	Jalan Besar
	Azwan Ali Rahman 8'; Gabriel Gama 57'	Report	Maxime Lestienne 45'; Toni Datković 66'; Bailey Wright 70'	Stadium: Jalan Besar Stadium; Referee: Zulfiqar Mustaffa

27 May 2025 Semi final leg 2	Lion City Sailors (Singapore)	2–0 (5–2 agg.)	(Brunei) DPMM FC	Bishan
	Diogo Costa 33'; Toni Datković 60'	Report	Gabriel Gama (yellow card) 31'; Abdul Hariz Herman (yellow card) 7'; Damir Muminovic (yellow card) 58'; Nur Ikhwan Othman (yellow card) 58'	Stadium: Bishan Stadium; Referee: Jansen Foo

31 May 2025 Final	BG Tampines Rovers (Singapore)	0–1	(Singapore) Lion City Sailors	Jalan Besar
	Miloš Zlatković (yellow card) 85'; Shah Shahiran (red card) 93'	Report	Bart Ramselaar 49' (yellow card) 90'; Song Ui-young (yellow card) 45+1'	Stadium: Jalan Besar Stadium; Attendance: 2,766; Referee: Muhammad Taqi

=== AFC Champions League Two ===
==== Group stage ====
Pos	Team	Pld	W	D	L	GF	GA	GD	Pts	Qualification	LCS	POR	ZHP	PSB
1	(Singapore) Lion City Sailors	6	3	1	2	15	11	+4	10	Advance to round of 16	—	5–2	2–0	2–3
2	(Thailand) Port	6	3	1	2	9	11	−2	10	Advance to round of 16	1–3	—	1–0	2–2
3	(China) Zhejiang	6	3	0	3	10	10	0	9		4–2	1–2	—	1–0
4	(Indonesia) Persib	6	1	2	3	9	11	−2	5		1–1	0–1	3–4	—

Source: AFC
Rules for classification: Tiebreakers

19 September 2024 Matchday 1	Lion City Sailors (Singapore)	2–0	(China) Zhejiang	Jalan Besar, Singapore
	Hariss Harun 44' (yellow card) 45+1'; Maxime Lestienne 79'; Izwan Mahbud (yellow card) 70'	Report	Cheng Jin (yellow card) 66'; Li Tixiang (yellow card) 83'	Stadium: Jalan Besar Stadium (Note: LCS played their home matches at Jalan Besar Stadium, Kallang, instead of their regular home stadium, Bishan Stadium.); Attendance: 2,468; Referee: Payam Heydari (Iran)

30 October 2024 Matchday 2 (Rescheduled)	Port (Thailand)	1–3	(Singapore) Lion City Sailors	Pathum Thani, Thailand
	Noboru Shimura 55'; Peeradon Chamratsamee (yellow card) 38'	Report	Shawal Anuar 14', 17'; Song Ui-young 65' (yellow card) 39'; Hariss Harun (yellow card) 61'; Christopher van Huizen (yellow card) 86'	Stadium: BG Stadium (Note: Port played their home matches at Pathum Thani Stadium, Pathum Thani, instead of their regular home stadium PAT Stadium, Bangkok.); Referee: Faisal Alblwi (Saudi Arabia)

24 October 2024 Matchday 3	Persib (Indonesia)	1–1	(Singapore) Lion City Sailors	West Java, Indonesia
	Tyronne del Pino 43'; Dimas Drajad (red card) 51'	Report	Bailey Wright 49'; Rui Pires (yellow card) 16'; Toni Datković (yellow card) 77'; Bart Ramselaar (red card) 90+5'	Stadium: Jalak Harupat Stadium; Attendance: 2,111; Referee: Bijan Heydari (Iran)

7 November 2024 Matchday 4	Lion City Sailors (Singapore)	2–3	(Indonesia) Persib	Jalan Besar, Singapore
	Shawal Anuar 8' (yellow card) 41'; Maxime Lestienne 23'; Hami Syahin (yellow card) 11'	Report	David da Silva 83'; Mateo Kocijan 90+3'; Tyronne del Pino 90+4'; Beckham Putra (yellow card) 54'	Stadium: Jalan Besar Stadium; Attendance: 3,152; Referee: Gamini Nivon Robesh (Sri Lanka)

28 November 2024 Matchday 5	Zhejiang (China)	4–2	(Singapore) Lion City Sailors	Hangzhou, China
	Andrijašević 65' (pen.); Sun Zheng'ao 69'; Kouassi 86' (yellow card) 88'; Wang Yudong 90+4' (yellow card) 90+4'; Wang Dongsheng (yellow card) 66'; Zhao Bo (yellow card) 90+2'	Report	Datković 45+4'; Song Ui-young 62'; Bailey Wright (yellow card) 43'; Maxime Lestienne (yellow card) 44'; Christopher van Huizen (yellow card) 67'; Hami Syahin (yellow card) 73'; Izwan Mahbud (yellow card) 81'; Shawal Anuar (yellow card) 89'	Stadium: Huanglong Sports Center; Attendance: 12,836; Referee: Zaid Thamer (Iraq)

5 December 2024 Matchday 6	Lion City Sailors (Singapore)	5–2	(Thailand) Port	Jalan Besar, Singapore
	Song Ui-young 1', 36', 67'; Shawal Anuar 71'; Lennart Thy 90+8'; Hami Syahin (yellow card) 76'; Bill Mamadou (yellow card) 90+4'	Report	Felipe Amorim 50'; Frans Putros 52'	Stadium: Jalan Besar Stadium; Attendance: 2,357; Referee: Casey Reibelt (Australia)

==== Knockout stage ====
13 February 2025 R16 leg 1	Muangthong United (Thailand)	2–3	(Singapore) Lion City Sailors	Nonthaburi, Thailand
	Melvyn Lorenzen 56' (yellow card) 63'; Tristan Do 90+10'	Report	Shawal Anuar 1'; Maxime Lestienne 11' (pen.); Bart Ramselaar 27'; Song Ui-young (red card) 53'; Diogo Costa (yellow card) 90+1'; Zharfan Rohaizad (yellow card) 90+5'	Stadium: Thunderdome Stadium; Attendance: 3,865; Referee: Kim Jong-hyeok (South Korea)

20 February 2025 R16 leg 2	Lion City Sailors (Singapore)	4–0 (7–2 agg.)	(Thailand) Muangthong United	Jalan Besar, Singapore
	Maxime Lestienne 3' (pen.); Bart Ramselaar 45+3'; Shawal Anuar 63', 88' (yellow card) 21'; Hariss Harun (yellow card) 40'	Report	Sorawit Panthong (yellow card) 24'; Tristan Do (yellow card) 50'	Stadium: Jalan Besar Stadium; Attendance: 2,749; Referee: Payam Heydari (Iran)

5 March 2025 QF leg 1	Sanfrecce Hiroshima (Japan)	0–3; Awarded (Note: The Sanfrecce Hiroshima v Lion City Sailors first leg, originally won 6–1 by Sanfrecce Hiroshima, was forfeited and awarded 3–0 to Lion City Sailors by the AFC Disciplinary Committee on 8 March 2025, as Sanfrecce Hiroshima fielded Valère Germain, even though he was suspended.)	(Singapore) Lion City Sailors	Hiroshima, Japan
		Report		Stadium: Edion Peace Wing Hiroshima; Attendance: 6,812; Referee: Mooud Bonyadifard (Iran)

12 March 2025 QF leg 2	Lion City Sailors (Singapore)	1–1 (4–1 agg.)	(Japan) Sanfrecce Hiroshima	Jalan Besar, Singapore
	Lennart Thy 20'; Bailey Wright (yellow card) 51'; Obren Kljajic (yellow card) 90+5'	Report	Yotaro Nakajima 34'; Ryo Germain (red card) 51'	Stadium: Jalan Besar Stadium; Attendance: 4,193; Referee: Ahmed Issa (United Arab Emirates)

9 April 2025 SF leg 1	Lion City Sailors (Singapore)	2–0	(Australia) Sydney FC	Jalan Besar, Singapore
	Bart Ramselaar 18'; Lennart Thy 53'; Maxime Lestienne (yellow card) 90+3'	Report		Stadium: Jalan Besar Stadium; Attendance: 4,213; Referee: Zaid Thamer (Iraq)

16 April 2025 SF leg 2	Sydney FC (Australia)	1–0 (1–2 agg.)	(Singapore) Lion City Sailors	Sydney, Australia
	Joe Lolley 85' (yellow card) 25'; Alexandar Popovic (yellow card) 31'; Douglas Costa (yellow card) 57'	Report	Maxime Lestienne (yellow card) 45'; Izwan Mahbud (yellow card) 90+5'	Stadium: Sydney Football Stadium; Attendance: 10,588; Referee: Abdullah Jamali (Kuwait)

18 May 2025 Final	Lion City Sailors (Singapore)	1–2	(United Arab Emirates) Sharjah	Bishan, Singapore
	Maxime Lestienne 90+2'; Diogo Costa (yellow card) 80'; Bailey Wright (yellow card) 89'	Report	Firas Ben Larbi 74' (yellow card) 45'; Marcus Meloni 90+6'; Khaled Ibrahim (yellow card) 79'; Luanzinho (yellow card) 90+6'	Stadium: Bishan Stadium; Attendance: 9,737; Referee: Ammar Mahfoodh (Bahrain)

=== ASEAN Club Championship ===
==== Group stage ====
Pos	Team	Pld	W	D	L	GF	GA	GD	Pts	Qualification	CAH	BUR	KLC	BOR	LCS	KAY
2	(Thailand) Buriram United	5	3	1	1	13	2	+11	10	Advance to Semi-finals			1–0	4–0		7–0
3	(Malaysia) Kuala Lumpur City	5	2	0	3	4	6	−2	6 (Note: Ranked on head-to-head points: Kuala Lumpur City (3); Borneo (0).)		2–3			1–0		1–0
4	(Indonesia) Borneo	5	2	0	3	7	9	−2	6						3–0	2–1
5	(Singapore) Lion City Sailors	5	1	1	3	2	10	−8	4			0–0	2–0			
6	(Philippines) Kaya–Iloilo	5	1	0	4	4	12	−8	3		1–2				2–0	

Source: ASEAN United FC
Rules for classification: Tiebreakers
Notes:

22 August 2024 Matchday 1	Borneo F.C. (Indonesia)	3–0	(Singapore) Lion City Sailors	Balikpapan, Indonesia
	Léo Gaúcho 3', 80'; Berguinho 20'	Report	Rui Pires (red card) 52'	Stadium: Batakan Stadium; Referee: Ko Hyung-jin (South Korea)

26 September 2024 Matchday 2	Cong An Hanoi FC (Vietnam)	5–0	(Singapore) Lion City Sailors	Hanoi, Vietnam
	Léo Artur 10', 69', 86'; Nguyễn Đình Bắc 60'; Lê Văn Đô 66'	Report	Bart Ramselaar (yellow card) 81'	Stadium: Hàng Đẫy Stadium; Referee: Abdullah Al Shehri (Saudi Arabia)

9 January 2025 Matchday 3	Lion City Sailors (Singapore)	2–0	(Malaysia) Kuala Lumpur City	Jalan Besar, Singapore
	Bailey Wright 26'; Maxime Lestienne 66'; Rui Pires (yellow card) 32'	Report	Paulo Josué (yellow card) 12'; Arif Shaqirin (yellow card) 85'	Stadium: Jalan Besar Stadium; Attendance: 1,813; Referee: Shen Yinhao (China)

23 January 2025 Matchday 4	Lion City Sailors (Singapore)	0–0	(Thailand) Buriram United	Jalan Besar, Singapore
		Report	Sasalak Haiprakhon (yellow card) 34'; Kenny Dougall (red card) 42'	Stadium: Jalan Besar Stadium; Referee: Omar Al-Yaqoubi (Oman)

6 February 2025 Matchday 5	Kaya F.C.–Iloilo (Philippines)	2–0	(Singapore) Lion City Sailors	Biñan, Philippines
	Lucas del Rosario 65'; Jesus Melliza 71' (pen.); Eric Esso (yellow card) 90+4'	Report	Harris Harun (yellow card) 69'; Song Ui-young (yellow card) 75'	Stadium: Biñan Football Stadium; Referee: Firdavs Nosafarov (Uzbekistan)
