= Singapore Youth League =

- Organising body: Football Association of Singapore
- Founded: 2024; 2 years ago
- Country: Singapore
- Number of clubs: 316 (2025)
- Level on pyramid: 6
- Website: syl.sg
- Current: 2025 Singapore Youth League

The Singapore Youth League (SYL) is a youth football tournament for clubs that are affiliated to the Football Association of Singapore. SYL was launched in 2024 to provide a competitive platform for young players to showcase their talent and gain valuable match experience.

The inaugural season is set to feature over 200 registered teams from 52 clubs and academies across various age groups. The league will kick off on the weekend of 24 and 25 February 2024.

== History ==
On 3 August 2023, the Football Association of Singapore (FAS) announced that Singapore Youth League (SYL) will be launched in 2024 to provide a competitive platform for young players to showcase their talent and gain valuable match experience. The league is part of the Unleash the Roar! (UTR!) national football project.

The tournaments under FAS's governance follow a programming matrix that specifies the minimum number of games each age group must play to ensure their comprehensive youth development. By establishing these competitive platforms and age-specific leagues, the SYL tournament aims to nurture young talent and provide them with the best environment to progress in their football journey.

FAS Academy Accreditation System (AAS) was also introduced to recognize and support various academies while fostering youth development in Singapore through specific criteria for their enhancement. Clubs and academies will be accredited based on the following criteria of Talent Identification, Coaching, Player Performance, Player Welfare, and Annual Assessment. Successful academies will then be accorded with different levels of accreditation from Level One (highest level) to Level Three (base level). The AAS will also provide an “avenue” into a structured competition - Singapore Youth League.

The competition will involve children of various age groups from U-8s, U-10s, U-12s, U-13s, U-15s and U-17. A promotion-relegation system, with three divisions planned for U-13s, U-15s and U-17s, are in the planning.

On 15 December 2023, FAS shared on various social media platforms that a total of 216 teams have been registered from 53 Clubs and Academies that have signed up via the Academy Accreditation System across the different age groups. This included invited teams such as ActiveSG Football Academy, Johor Darul Ta'zim F.C. and Singapore Sports School.

On 6 February 2024, FAS officially announced the league is set to feature over 200 registered teams from 52 clubs and academies across various age groups. The league will kick off on the weekend of 24 and 25 February 2024.

Prior to the inaugural season, teams will undergo an initial classification round of matches to help determine their level. Based on the results of the classification round, teams will be placed in divisions consisting of sides of similar strength for the league proper. The SYL will include a promotion/relegation feature across all age groups, where teams can move up or down divisions based on performance.

SYL will be introducing a Girls-only division for Under-10, Under-12 and Under-14 for the 2025 season. The 2025 season will see 316 teams taking part in the SYL, a 58 per cent increase from last year’s inaugural season.

The league enter the Singapore Book of Records for most football teams kicking off simultaneously on 9 February 2025. 36 teams in the Under-8, Under-9, Under-10, Under-15 and Under-17 categories kicked off their matches at 8am across multiple venues. The 2025 season will see 316 teams taking part in the SYL, a 58 per cent increase from last year’s inaugural season.

The first-ever SYL Cup (Junior & Girls) was introduced, with matches being played on 12 and 13 July 2025. From group stages to knockout rounds, the SYL Cup brings together U8 to U12 SYL teams, including SYL Girls across U10, U12, and U14, from clubs and academies.

The 2026 season introduced its first-ever Under-19 category, adding a new layer to a competition that now spans 13 age groups and involves around 6,000 boys and girls across Singapore. The Under-19 category gives players a more suitable platform to continue competing, learning and growing.

On 13 August 2026, FAS announced a new "high-performance" youth competition, the Singapore Premier Youth League (SPYL), which builds on the adidas Elite Youth League (EYL), formerly known as Youth Champions League. The competition will be organised by FAS and supported by UTR! National football project. Promotion and relegation will be introduced between the SPYL, JSSL League - Singapore’s oldest youth league – and Singapore Youth League for the Under-10 to Under-17 age groups.

== Competition format ==
Age-group categories
| Categories | No. of teams | Format | Duration per match |
|---|---|---|---|
| Under-17 | 28 teams | 11v11 | 90-minute |
| Under-15 | 33 teams | 11v11 | 90-minute |
| Under-13 | 25 teams | 11v11 | 80-minute |
| Under-12 | 39 teams | 9v9 | 60-minute |
| Under-10 | 46 teams | 7v7 | 30-minute |
| Under-8 | 38 teams | 5v5 | 24-minute |

== Past champions ==
=== Under-19 ===
| Season | Division 1 |
|---|---|
| 2026 | Lion City Sailors |

=== Under-17 ===
| Season | Division 1 | Division 2 | Division 3 |
|---|---|---|---|
| 2024 | Lion City Sailors | St Michael's Soccer Assoc. | Verde Cresta Combined SC |
| 2025 | Lion City Sailors | St Michael's Soccer Academy | Borussia Academy Singapore |
| 2026 | Lion City Sailors | Hougang United | |

=== Under-15 ===
| Season | Division 1 | Division 2 | Division 3 |
|---|---|---|---|
| 2024 | Johor Darul Ta'zim FC (Malaysia) | Barcelona Academy | East Coast United FA |
| 2025 | BG Tampines Rovers | Balestier Khalsa | Flair Football Academy |
| 2026 | Balestier Khalsa | Hougang United | Gaelic Lions Academy |

=== Under-14 ===
| Season | Division 1 | Division 2 |
|---|---|---|
| 2025 | Lion City Sailors | Albirex AFA |
| 2026 | Lion City Sailors | Woodlands Lions FC |

=== Girls Under-14 ===
| Season | Division 1 |
|---|---|
| 2025 | Lion City Sailors |
| 2026 | STAR Soccer Academy Girls |

=== Under-13 ===
| Season | Division 1 | Division 2 | Division 3 |
|---|---|---|---|
| 2024 | Johor Darul Ta'zim FC (Malaysia) | Flair Football Academy | |
| 2025 | Johor Darul Ta'zim FC (Malaysia) | SG7 Soccer Academic | Pasirian Lions FC |
| 2026 | BG Tampines Rovers | DC AFA | |

=== Under-12 ===
| Season | Division 1 | Division 2 | Division 3 | Division 4 |
|---|---|---|---|---|
| 2024 | Island City FC | Albirex Singapore FA | Pasirian Lions FC | Liverpool FC IA SG Gakpo |
| 2025 | Lion City Sailors FC | Bukit Gombak AFA | Munich Football School Singapore | Admiralty Kings FC |
| 2026 | Junior NDC Team Red | Meridian AFA | Gaulois Aerion | Euro Soccer Academy |

=== Girls Under-12 ===
| Season | Division 1 |
|---|---|
| 2025 | ActiveSG FA Girls |
| 2026 | SG7 Soccer Academic Girls |

=== Under-11 ===
| Season | Division 1 | Division 2 | Division 3 | Division 4 |
|---|---|---|---|---|
| 2025 | Bukit Batok East CSN | F17 Football Academy | Pasirian Lions FC | |
| 2026 | Junior NDC Team Blue | Etoile Football Club | Euro Soccer Academy | Panthers Saint-Germain Academy |

=== Under-10 ===
| Season | Division 1 | Division 2 | Division 3 | Division 4 |
|---|---|---|---|---|
| 2024 | Geylang International AFA | Junior NDC U9 Team White | Tanjong Pagar United AFA | First Kick Hypernovas |
| 2025 | Junior NDC Team Red | Soaring Dreams Football Academy Kirins | Technique Pro FA A | Spanish Soccer Club Asia Marcelo |
| 2026 | Flair Football Academy | SG7 Soccer Academic A | St Michael's Soccer Academy B | Kranji AFA |

=== Girls Under-10 ===
| Season | Division 1 |
|---|---|
| 2025 | Lion City Sailors Girls Blue |
| 2026 | Eastern Thunder FC A Girls |

=== Under-9 ===
| Season | Division 1 | Division 2 | Division 3 | Division 4 |
|---|---|---|---|---|
| 2025 | Barça Academy 2016 Groc | Bukit Gombak AFA | First Kick Brilliance | |
| 2026 | Elite FC | Gaulois Aerion Chargers | Northern Wolves FC | FC Jurong Football Academy |

=== Under-8 ===
| Season | Division 1 | Division 2 | Division 3 | Division 4 |
|---|---|---|---|---|
| 2024 | Spanish Soccer Club Asia | Junior NDC Team Red | Balestier Khalsa AFA | FFF Academy |
| 2025 | Geylang International AFA (Dunman High AFA) | Sky Football Academy | Junior NDC Girls | Soaring Dreams Football Academy |
| 2026 | Gaulois Aerion Raiders | Spanish Sportive Club Asia A | Meridian AFA | FC Jurong Football Academy |

== See also ==
- Football in Singapore
- Football Association of Singapore
- Prime League
- Singapore football league system
