= Salif Cissé (footballer, born 1992) =

French footballer

Personal information
- Date of birth: 12 July 1992 (age 34)
- Place of birth: Dreux, France
- Height: 1.87 m (6 ft 2 in)
- Position: Forward

Team information
- Current team: Tanjong Pagar United
- Number: 9

Senior career*
Years	Team	Apps	(Gls)
2010–2012	Le Mans B	4	(0)
2011	→ Le Mans (loan)	1	(0)
2013–2014	Limoges	21	(5)
2014–2015	Luçon	5	(1)
2015	Motema Pembe		
2016–2018	Belfort	15	(1)
2018–2019	Athlético Marseille	8	(1)
2019	Granville	11	(2)
2020	Tsarsko Selo	6	(0)
2020–2021	Botev Plovdiv	19	(2)
2022–2023	Hegelmann	27	(2)
2023	Kapaz	13	(1)
2024–	Tanjong Pagar United	11	(6)
- * Club domestic league appearances and goals as of 31 December 2024

Salif Cissé (born 12 July 1992) is a French professional footballer who plays as a forward for Singapore Premier League club Tanjong Pagar United.

== Career ==
Cissé started his career with French second division side Le Mans, where he made one league appearance and scored no goals.

In 2013, Cissé signed for Limoges in the French fifth division. In 2015, he signed for Democratic Republic of the Congo club Motema Pembe In 2016, he signed for Belfort in the French third division after trialing for French second division team Sochaux. In 2018, Cissé signed for Athlético Marseille in the French fourth division.

Before the second half of 2018–19, he signed for French fourth division outfit Granville.

In 2020, he signed for Tsarsko Selo in the Bulgarian top flight.

On 25 January, he signed with the Lithuanian side, Hegelmann.

== Personal life ==
Cissé was born in France to a family with Malian origins, with two of his brothers – Kalifa and Ibrahima – who also embraced a professional footballing career.

== Career statistics ==
As of match played 2 Feb 25

Appearances and goals by club, season and competition
Club	Season	League			Cup		Continental		Other		Total	
Club	Season	Division	Apps	Goals	Apps	Goals	Apps	Goals	Apps	Goals	Apps	Goals
Limoges FC	2013–14	Championnat National 3	21	5	0	0	0	0	0	0	21	5
Luçon	2014–15	Championnat National	5	1	0	0	0	0	0	0	5	1
DCMP	2015–16	Linafoot	0	0	0	0	0	0	0	0	0	0
ASM Belfort	2016–17	Championnat National	15	1	0	0	0	0	0	0	15	1
ASM Belfort	2017–18	Championnat National 2	0	0	0	0	0	0	0	0	0	0
ASM Belfort	Total		15	1	0	0	0	0	0	0	15	1
Athlético Marseille	2018–19	Championnat National 2	8	1	0	0	0	0	0	0	8	1
Granville	2018–19	Championnat National 2	11	2	0	0	0	0	0	0	11	2
Tsarsko Selo Sofia	2020–21	Bulgarian First League	6	0	0	0	0	0	0	0	6	0
Botev Plovdiv	2020–21	Bulgarian First League	18	2	2	2	0	0	0	0	20	4
FC Hegelmann	2022	A Lyga	27	2	3	2	0	0	0	0	30	4
Kapaz PFK	2022–23	Azerbaijan Premier League	13	1	0	0	0	0	0	0	13	1
Tanjong Pagar United	2024–25	Singapore Premier League	19	11	1	1	0	0	0	0	20	12
Career total			143	26	6	5	0	0	0	0	149	31
