= Football Association of Singapore =

FAS Singapore Association Football

AFC
- Founded: 5 August 1892; 134 years ago (as Singapore Football Association); 14 May 1929; 97 years ago (as Singapore Amateur Football Association); 13 January 1966; 60 years ago (as Football Association of Singapore)
- Headquarters: 100 Tyrwhitt Rd, Jalan Besar Stadium, Singapore 207542
- FIFA affiliation: 1952; 74 years ago
- AFC affiliation: 1954; 72 years ago
- AFF affiliation: 1984; 42 years ago
- President: Forrest Li
- Website: www.fas.org.sg

The Football Association of Singapore (FAS) is the governing body responsible for the administration of football in Singapore. Established in 1892 as the Singapore Football Association (SFA), it is the oldest football association in all of Asia. The FAS is also one of the founding members of both the Asian Football Confederation (AFC) and the ASEAN Football Federation (AFF). It has been affiliated with FIFA since 1952.

The FAS oversees the organisation and development of football and advancing the game at all levels in Singapore, and is responsible for all aspects of the amateur and professional game in its territory. This includes its flagship domestic league, the Singapore Premier League (SPL), as well as the men's, women's and youth national football teams. The FAS is headquartered at the Jalan Besar Stadium.

The FAS also manages the organisation and running of league and cup competitions, the stewardship of international teams, the establishment of youth development, women's football, refereeing and coaching frameworks.

On 28 April 2025, Forrest Li was elected President of the FAS.

== History ==
On 5 August 1892, the Singapore Football Association (SFA) met to discuss awarding a challenge cup and medals for the winning team in the cup competition that had taken place that year. The SFA was exempted from the formal requirements of the Societies Ordinance, as published in the Government Gazette in September that year.

On 14 May 1929, the SFA changed its name to the Singapore Amateur Football Association (SAFA), to distinguish itself from the Selangor Football Association.

On 13 January 1966, after the independence of Singapore in 1965, the SAFA changed its name to the Football Association of Singapore. The FAS had to re-apply for FIFA membership.

The FAS council was first appointed by the government in 1968, and has been controlled continually by government appointees for more than three decades from the 1980s to 2015. From 2004 to 2015, its president had been an elected member of the ruling People's Action Party, and was appointed by the Minister for Sports.

The Football Association of Singapore was registered as a society under Singapore's Societies Act 1966 on 11 February 1982.

In 2015, FIFA requested an end to political appointments of the national body's council members. FAS therefore changed its constitution in 2016 and held general elections for its council members starting from 2017. In response, the FAS also stated that "We have always been in consultation with FIFA over the last 30 years. They are aware of the uniqueness of our situation, and have always given us special dispensation."

As a result in the change of constitution, FAS, on the request of FIFA and its past presidents, held its first election for the FAS council. The election was contested by two teams led by Lim Kia Tong, FAS provisional council president, and Bill Ng, chairman of Hougang United and NFL side, Tiong Bahru FC. The election was held on 29 April 2017 and Lim won the elections.

== Youth development programmes ==
The National Football Academy (NFA) was launched by the FAS on 13 August 2000 with the aim of developing Singapore's most promising young footballers.

In 2013, the FAS revamped its youth development programme to develop talent through the Centre of Excellence (COE) system. NFA ceased to operate soon after.

From 2014 onwards, the FAS continued to organise both an Under-15 League and an Under-17 League through the COE, until 2023.

The Under-15 and Under-17 leagues are now part of a broader range of age-group leagues under the Singapore Youth League, which covers several age groups.

== Former presidents ==
- Soh Ghee Soon: 1957–1963
- Hussein Kumari: 1963–1965
- Abu Bakar Pawanchee: 1965–1967
- Tay Soo Yong: 1967–1968
- Woon Wah Siang: 1968
- Lenny Rodrigo: 1968–1971
- NSPB / SSC: 1971–1974 (Note: The FAS was under the management of the National Sports Promotion Board and later, the Singapore Sports Council.)
- R.B.I. Pates: 1974–1976
- N. Ganesan: 1976–1982
- Teo Chong Tee: 1982–1988
- Abbas Abu Amin: 1988–1991
- Hsu Tse-Kwang: 1991–1994
- Ibrahim Othman: 1994–1999
- Mah Bow Tan: 1999–2004
- Ho Peng Kee: 2004–2009
- Zainudin Nordin: 2009–2016
- Lim Kia Tong: 2017–2022
- Bernard Tan: 2022–2025 (interim)
- Forrest Li: 2025–present

== Current FAS council members ==
Council member from 2025–2029.

Name	Position	Source
(Singapore) Desmond Ong	Deputy President	
(Singapore) Bill Ng	Vice President	
(Singapore) Sean Bai	Vice-President	
(Singapore) Hariss Harun	Vice-President	
(Singapore) Tan Li Yu	Vice-President	
(Singapore) Bruce Liang	Member	
(Singapore) Arivan Shanmugaratnam	Member	
(Singapore) Roy Quek	Member	
(Singapore) Yeong Sheau Shyan	Member	
(Singapore) Aleksandar Đurić	Member	
(Singapore) Aide Iskandar	Member	
(Singapore) Andy Tan	Member	
(Singapore) Syed Faris	Member	
(Singapore) Dinesh Nair	Member	

== List of collaborations ==
Club and association collaboration

- Japan Football Association (2011–present)
- (Spain) LALIGA (2015–present)
- (France) French Football Federation (2022–present)
- (Japan) Tokyo Verdy (2024–present)
- (Japan) Ventforet Kofu (2024–present)
- (Qatar) Aspire Academy (2025–present)

=== Regional collaborations ===
- Johor Football Association (2023–present)
- (Thailand) BG Pathum United (2024–present)

=== Former collaborations ===
- (Saudi Arabia) Saudi Arabian Football Federation (2022–2024)

With FAS and JFA signing a Memorandum of Understanding (MOU), the Singapore national team also sees themselves playing a couple of friendly against Japanese club in Japan as part of their preparation for the 2024 ASEAN Championship. While the Coach Overseas Attachment (COA) programme, an initiative by the Unleash The Roar will see Singapore coaches immersed in the day-to-day dealings of first-team training. In May 2024, Isa Halim and Noh Alam Shah was sent to Tokyo Verdy on a training stint. Following successful stints by Singaporean former national icons, in January 2025, Ratna Suffian and Miur Rafik Taha was sent to Tokyo Verdy on a coaching attachment, while Young Lions coach Nazri Nasir joined another J2 League club Ventforet Kofu as the club assistant coach assisting head coach Shinji Otsuka for the 2025 season.

While LALIGA also send a couple of team to compete in the JSSL 7's in Singapore with the likes of Valencia, Barcelona, Atletico Madrid and Villarreal. In 2022, 14-years old footballer Denzel Ari Thrumurgan is set to be the first Singaporean to train and study at the LaLiga Academy in Madrid In 2023, 17-years old Loo Kai Sheng and 16-years old Uchenna Eziakor were the players sent to LaLiga Academy.

== FAS tournaments ==
League competitions

- Singapore Premier League
- Singapore Football League (2 divisions)
- Island Wide League
- Women's Premier League
- Women's National League
- Singapore Youth League

Cup competitions

- Singapore Cup
- Singapore FA Cup

== See also ==
- Football in Singapore
- Singapore national football team
- Singapore women's national football team
- Singapore national futsal team
- Singapore football league system
