= Tomoki Wada =

Japanese footballer (born 1994)

Personal information
- Date of birth: 30 October 1994 (age 32)
- Place of birth: Kobe, Japan
- Height: 1.72 m (5 ft 8 in)
- Position: Attacking midfielder

Team information
- Current team: Sydney United 58
- Number: 8

Youth career
- –2013: Vissel Kobe

Senior career*
Years	Team	Apps	(Gls)
2013–2016	Vissel Kobe	1	(0)
2014	→ J.League U22 Selection (loan)	12	(0)
2015	→ Incheon United (loan)	3	(1)
2016–2017	Gwangju	11	(1)
2017–2018	Seoul E-Land	2	(0)
2018–2019	Lagend Shiga		
2019–2020	Corrimal Rangers		
2020–2022	Rockdale Ilinden	51	(9)
2022–2023	Persikabo 1973	12	(2)
2023	Avondale	2	(0)
2023–2024	Maziya	6	(1)
2024–2025	Tanjong Pagar United	31	(2)
2026-	Sydney United 58	24	(4)
- * Club domestic league appearances and goals as of 19 October 2026

Tomoki Wada (和田 倫季, Wada Tomoki; born 30 October 1994) is a Japanese professional footballer who plays as an attacking midfielder for Sydney United 58.

== Career ==
=== Vissel Kobe ===
In 2013 Wada joined Vissel Kobe on a two-year deal, Wada only played one Japanese League Cup game for Vissel Kobe and then got loaned out to J.League U22 Selection and played twelve matches and scored two goals.

=== Incheon United FC ===
In 2015 Wada signed a one-year loan deal with Incheon United, where he managed to play twenty-two matches and scored two goals throughout his time at the club.

=== Gwangju FC ===
In 2016 Wada signed for Gwangju on a one-year deal, Wada only played twenty-eight games for the club.

=== Seoul E-Land ===
In 2017 Wada signed a three-year deal with Korean second-division side Seoul E-Land and managed to play thirty-five matches and scored eight goals whilst his three years with the club.

While at the Seoul E-Land, Tomoki played with his brother Atsuki Wada, who had already been playing for club since earlier in the 2017 season.

=== Rockdale Ilinden FC ===
In 2020 Wada decided to leave South Korea and move to Australia with dreams of playing in the Australian A-League Wada put pen to paper with semi-professional side Rockdale Ilinden on a three-year deal where Wada proved his talent to the Australian New South Wales Premier League and played in fifty-two matches for Rockdale and scored fourteen goals. Wada was a key part of Rockdale advancing to a place in the 2020 Australian New South Wales Premier League final where they were defeated by Sydney United 58.

=== Persikabo 1973 ===
After a successful three-year spell with Rockdale Ilinden In 2022, Wada wanted to leave back to Asia and play football, he signed a two-year deal with Persikabo 1973 and played twelve matches and scored two goals. Wada at the halfway point of the season terminated his contract with Persikabo 1973 and now is without a club as of the new year.

=== Avondale FC ===
Wada played for Avondale FC during the 2023 season.

=== Maziya Sports and Recreation Club ===
While playing for Maziya in 2023, Wada scored a goal in the AFC Cup match against Mohun Bagan played in Salt Lake City.

=== Tanjong Pagar United ===
Tomoki joined Singapore Premier League side Tanjong Pagar United for the 2024–25 Singapore Premier League season.

== Australian state of origin ==
While in Australia playing for Rockdale Ilindin, Wada was named to the NSW state team for the State of Origin match against Queensland.

== Honours ==
Vissel Kobe

- J2 League: 2013

Incheon United

- K League 1: 2015

Rockdale Ilinden

- New South Wales Premier League: 2020
- Footballer of the Year: 2020, 2021

Sydney United 58

- National Premier Leagues NSW Championship: 2026
- Waratah Cup Champions: 2026
