= Anaqi Ismit =

Singaporean footballer

Personal information
- Full name: Muhamad Anaqi Bin Ismit
- Date of birth: 24 August 2001 (age 25)
- Place of birth: Singapore
- Position: Winger

Team information
- Current team: Tanjong Pagar United
- Number: 66

Youth career
- –2020: Lion City Sailors

Senior career*
Years	Team	Apps	(Gls)
2019–2023	Lion City Sailors	6	(0)
2021	→ Tanjong Pagar United (loan)	12	(4)
2024	Tanjong Pagar United	5	(1)
2026	Tanjong Pagar United	2	(1)

International career
2019–	Singapore U19	4	(0)
- * Club domestic league appearances and goals as of 15:04, 24 May 2021 (UTC)

Anaqi Ismit (born 24 August 2001) is a Singaporean professional footballer who plays primarily as a winger for Singapore Premier League club Tanjong Pagar United.

== Club career ==
=== Lion City Sailors ===
Anaqi spent his entire career at Home United (now known as Lion City Sailors) where he was promoted to the senior squad in the 2019 season. He made his debut against Albirex Niigata (S) on 18 July in a 3–3 draw.

On 18 April 2022, Anaqi make his AFC Champions League debut coming on as a substitution in 3–0 win over Korean club Daegu FC.

==== Tanjong Pagar United (loan) ====
On 25 February 2021, Anaqi joined Tanjong Pagar United on a season loan. He make his debut for the club on 21 March in a 3–1 lost against Tampines Rovers. On 24 July, he scored his first professional goal in a 4–1 win over Hougang United. On 10 October in a match against Albirex Niigata (S), as his team was down at 4–1, Anaqi would then score a brace to levelled the score at 4–4 with both team sharing one point in the league.

=== Tanjong Pagar United ===
On 17 February 2024, Anaqi joined Tanjong Pagar United on a free transfer. On 29 June, he scored a goal in a 3–2 win which secured his team first win in the league.

== Career statistics ==
=== Club ===
As of 10 October 2021

Club	Season	League			Singapore Cup		League Cup		ACL / AFC Cup		Total	
Club	Season	Division	Apps	Goals	Apps	Goals	Apps	Goals	Apps	Goals	Apps	Goals
Home United	2019	Singapore Premier League	1	0	0	0	0	0	0	0	1	0
Home United	Total		1	0	0	0	0	0	0	0	1	0
Lion City Sailors	2020	Singapore Premier League	0	0	0	0	0	0	0	0	0	0
Lion City Sailors	Total		0	0	0	0	0	0	0	0	0	0
Tanjong Pagar United (on loan)	2021	Singapore Premier League	12	4	0	0	0	0	0	0	12	4
Tanjong Pagar United (on loan)	Total		12	4	0	0	0	0	0	0	12	4
Lion City Sailors	2022	Singapore Premier League	5	0	0	0	0	0	3	0	8	0
Lion City Sailors	2023	Singapore Premier League	0	0	0	0	0	0	0	0	0	0
Lion City Sailors	Total		5	0	0	0	0	0	3	0	8	0
Career total			14	4	0	0	0	0	0	0	14	4

== Honours ==
=== Club ===
Home United

- COE U19 Challenge Cup 3rd place: 2018
