= Naqiuddin Eunos =

Singaporean footballer

Personal information
- Full name: Muhammad Naqiuddin bin Ahmad Eunos
- Date of birth: 12 January 1997 (age 29)
- Place of birth: Singapore
- Height: 1.76 m (5 ft 9 in)
- Positions: Winger; right-back

Team information
- Current team: Geylang International

Youth career
- –2017: NFA

Senior career*
Years	Team	Apps	(Gls)
2018–2019	Young Lions	24	(1)
2020–2022	Lion City Sailors	31	(0)
2023–2024	Tanjong Pagar United	23	(1)
2024–2025	Geylang International	31	(6)
2025–	Tanjong Pagar United	11	(0)

International career^{‡}
2019	Singapore U22	3	(0)
2023–	Singapore	5	(1)
- * Club domestic league appearances and goals as of 17:14, 14 January 2020 (UTC) ‡ National team caps and goals as of 14 December 2024

Muhammad Naqiuddin bin Ahmad Eunos (born 12 January 1997) is a Singaporean professional footballer who plays as a winger or a right-back for Singapore Premier League club Tanjong Pagar United and the Singapore national team.

== Club career ==
=== Young Lions ===
Naqiuddin signed for Young Lions in 2018 after being picked by Fandi Ahmad from the National Football Academy. He scored his first career goal in a 1–1 draw to Brunei DPMM on 7 August 2019.

=== Lion City Sailors ===
After being released by Young Lions, Naqiuddin signed for the Lion City Sailors on 14 February 2020. He make his debut on 6 March in a 1–1 draw to Tanjong Pagar United. On 21 April 2022, Naqiuddin made his AFC Champions League debut against Shandong Taishan keeping a clean sheet in the match.

=== Tanjong Pagar United ===
After being released by Lion City Sailors, Naqiuddin signed for the Tanjong Pagar United on 20 December 2022 for the upcoming 2023 Singapore Premier League season. He make his debut on 24 March 2023 in a 3–1 lost to his former club Lion City Sailors. O 15 July, he scored in a 2–2 draw against Geylang International.

=== Geylang International ===
On 16 January 2024, Naqiuddin signed for Geylang International. He make his debut on 10 May in a 2–2 draw to Balestier Khalsa. He went on to have a breakout season where hehas contributed five goals and four assists in 16 games in 2024, which is one goal more than in his 82 matches for the Young Lions, Jaguars and Lion City Sailors in the six preceding seasons. His performance has led to a national call-up from Tsutomu Ogura.

=== Return to Tanjong Pagar United ===
On 7 July 2025, Naqiuddin returned to Tanjong Pagar United.

== International career ==
=== Youth ===
Naqiuddin was named in the 2019 SEA Games squad by Fandi Ahmad.

=== Senior ===
Naqiuddin made his international debut on 16 June 2023 against Papua New Guinea. 2 days later, he earned his second cap against Solomon Islands.

On 14 November 2024, Naqiuddin scored the winning goal in the 88th minute during a friendly match which ended in a 3–2 win over Myanmar.

== Career statistics ==
=== Club ===
As of 7 July 2025

Club	Season	League			Cup		Continental		Other		Total	
Club	Season	Division	Apps	Goals	Apps	Goals	Apps	Goals	Apps	Goals	Apps	Goals
Young Lions	2018	Singapore Premier League	6	0	0	0	0	0	0	0	6	0
Young Lions	2019	Singapore Premier League	18	1	0	0	0	0	0	0	18	1
Young Lions	Total		24	1	0	0	0	0	0	0	24	1
Lion City Sailors	2020	Singapore Premier League	14	0	0	0	0	0	0	0	14	0
Lion City Sailors	2021	Singapore Premier League	10	0	0	0	0	0	0	0	10	0
Lion City Sailors	2022	Singapore Premier League	6	0	0	0	1	0	0	0	7	0
Lion City Sailors	Total		30	0	0	0	1	0	0	0	31	0
Tanjong Pagar United	2023	Singapore Premier League	23	1	3	2	0	0	0	0	24	3
Tanjong Pagar United	Total		23	1	3	2	0	0	0	0	24	3
Geylang International	2024–25	Singapore Premier League	31	6	1	3	0	0	0	0	34	6
Geylang International	Total		31	6	1	3	0	0	0	0	34	6
Career total			100	7	4	2	1	0	0	0	103	9

International goals

#	Date	Venue	Opponent	Score	Result	Competition
1.	14 November 2024	Singapore National Stadium, Singapore	Myanmar	3–2	3–2	Friendly

== Honours ==
=== Lion City Sailors ===
- Singapore Premier League: 2021
- Singapore Community Shield: 2022
