= 2024–25 Hougang United FC season =

Hougang United
2024–25 season
- Chairman: Bill Ng
- Head coach: Robert Eziakor (Interim, From 24 Dec 2024); Marko Kraljević (Till 23 Dec 2024)
- Stadium: Jalan Besar Stadium
- S.League: TBD
- Singapore Cup: TBD
- Top goalscorer: League: TBD; All: TBD
Home colours	Away colours

The 2024–25 season is Hougang United's 27th consecutive season in the top flight of Singapore football and in the Singapore Premier League and the Singapore Cup.

The women team will participate in the Women's Premier League.

== Season overview ==
Following their 2022 Singapore Cup victory, Hougang United's 2023 season started with high hopes. However, a slow start in the SPL, with just one win in their first seven matches, dashed their title aspirations. A coaching change sparked a turnaround, leading the Cheetahs to a Singapore Cup final appearance before ultimately falling to Lion City Sailors.

=== Transfer ===
In 2024, Hougang United underwent a squad overhaul. Figures like Zaiful Nizam, Nazrul Nazari, Anders Aplin, Shahdan Sulaiman, and Kristijan Krajcek provided experience and continuity. Underperforming players were released, paving the way for fresh talent.

The Cheetahs are embracing a Balkan influence with the signings of Ensar Brunčević (former Balestier defender), Stjepan Plazonja, Petar Banović, and Faris Hasic from Croatia and Bosnia. Additionally, Puttipat Kaewsawad joins on loan, while Shodai Yokoyama arrives from league champions Albirex Niigata (S).

This revamped Hougang United squad appears poised to challenge for success in the upcoming season.

=== Pre-season ===
In pre-season friendlies, the team enjoyed victories over Geylang International, Lion City Sailors, and Tanjong Pagar United. However, they fell short against Young Lions and BG Tampines Rovers.

Additionally, they participated in the SMJ Cup organized by Sabah FC, competing alongside Kuching City FC, Kuala Lumpur FC, and the hosts themselves.

== Squad ==
=== Singapore Premier League ===
No.	Name	Nationality	Date of birth (age)	Previous club	Contract since	Contract end
Goalkeepers
12	Kenji Syed Rusydi	(Singapore)	12 July 1998 (age 27)	(Singapore) Tanjong Pagar United	2024	2025
19	Zaiful Nizam	(Singapore)	24 July 1987 (age 38)	(Singapore) Geylang International	2023	2025
	Aizil Yazid	(Singapore)	24 December 2004 (age 21)	(Singapore) Young Lions FC	2021	2026
Defenders
2	Anders Aplin	(Singapore) (England)	21 June 1991 (age 35)	(Singapore) Geylang International	2020	2025
3	Jordan Nicolas Vestering	(Singapore) (Netherlands)	25 September 2000 (age 25)	(Singapore) NFA U18	2018	2025
4	Nazrul Nazari	(Singapore)	11 February 1991 (age 35)	(Singapore) LionsXII	2016	2025
5	Danish Irfan	(Singapore)	10 March 1999 (age 27)	(Singapore) Geylang International	2024	2025
21	Nazhiim Harman	(Singapore)	2 March 1999 (age 27)	(Singapore) Geylang International	2024	2025
23	Daniel Alemão	(Brazil)	4 April 1999 (age 27)	(Philippines) Cebu (P1)	2025	2025
31	Tajeli Salamat	(Singapore)	7 February 1994 (age 32)	(Singapore) Balestier Khalsa	2025	2025
33	Jovan Mugoša	(Montenegro) (Croatia)	27 October 1998 (age 27)	(Montenegro) FK Igalo 1929 (M2)	2025	2025
Midfielders
8	Shahdan Sulaiman	(Singapore)	9 May 1988 (age 38)	(Singapore) Lion City Sailors	2023	2025
11	Shodai Yokoyama	(Japan)	14 October 2000 (age 25)	(Japan) Albirex Niigata (S)	2024	2025
14	Ismail Salihović ^{FP U21}	(Serbia)	2 July 2003 (age 22)	(Serbia) FK Josanica (S3)	2024	2025
17	Justin Hui	(Singapore)	17 February 1998 (age 28)	(Singapore) Lion City Sailors	2024	2025
37	Zulfahmi Arifin	(Singapore)	5 October 1991 (age 34)	(Indonesia) Bhayangkara (I1)	2024	2025
64	Ratthathammanun Deeying ^{FP U21}	(Thailand)	10 December 2006 (age 19)	(Thailand) Chonburi F.C. (T2)	2025	2025
65	Parinya Kaochukiat ^{FP U21}	(Thailand)	4 November 2006 (age 19)	(Thailand) Chonburi F.C. (T2)	2025	2025
Strikers
7	Hazzuwan Halim	(Singapore)	2 February 1994 (age 32)	(Singapore) Geylang International	2023	2025
9	Stjepan Plazonja	(Croatia)	2 January 1998 (age 28)	(Bosnia and Herzegovina) NK Široki Brijeg (B1)	2024	2025
22	Gabriel Quak	(Singapore)	22 December 1990 (age 35)	(Singapore) Lion City Sailors	2023	2025
24	Zamani Zamri	(Singapore)	31 May 2001 (age 25)	(Japan) Albirex Niigata (S)	2024	2024
27	Farhan Zulkifli	(Singapore)	10 November 2002 (age 23)	(Singapore) Young Lions FC	2019	2025
30	Dejan Račić	(Montenegro) (Serbia)	15 July 1998 (age 27)	(Montenegro) FK Mornar (M1)	2024	2025
Players who left for NS during the season
16	Ajay Robson	(Singapore)	6 December 2003 (age 22)	Youth Team	2023	2025
Players who left during the season
6	Puttipat Kaewsawad ^{FP U21}	(Thailand)	12 October 2005 (age 20)	(Austria) SKN St. Pölten (A2)	2024	2024
10	Kristijan Krajcek	(Croatia)	1 October 1993 (age 32)	(Singapore) Balestier Khalsa	2022	2025
15	Ensar Brunčević	(Serbia)	13 February 1999 (age 27)	(Serbia) FK Novi Pazar (S1)	2024	2025
18	Nikesh Singh Sidhu	(Singapore)	24 February 1999 (age 27)	(Singapore) SAFSA	2019	2025
20	Faris Hasić ^{FP U21}	(Bosnia and Herzegovina)	13 June 2003 (age 23)	(Bosnia and Herzegovina) FK Mladost Doboj Kakanj (B2)	2024	2025
44	Petar Banović	(Bosnia and Herzegovina)	11 September 1997 (age 28)	(Bosnia and Herzegovina) HNK Tomislav (B2)	2024	2025

Remarks:
^{FP U21} These players are registered as U21 foreign players.

=== Women's squad ===
No.	Name	Nationality	Date of birth (age)	Previous club	Contract since	Contract end
Goalkeepers
1	Nurul Faizah	(Singapore)		(Singapore) Still Aerion Women's	2024	2025
15	Intan Afiqah	(Singapore)		(Singapore) Tanjong Pagar United (W)	2025	2025
Defenders
2	K.Harini	(Singapore)		(Singapore) Royal Arion (WNL)	2025	2025
3	Angelyn Pang Yen Ping	(Singapore)	13 April 1991 (age 35)	(Singapore) Tiong Bahru FC (W)	2023	2025
5	Jaslyn Leong Fei Ping	(Singapore)		(Singapore)	2024	2025
6	Claire Merrow-Smith	(Singapore)		(Singapore)	2023	2025
18	Rachel Liew	(Singapore)		(Singapore) Still Aerion Women's	2025	2025
22	Nuurfathimah Syaakirah	(Singapore)		(Singapore)	2025	2025
23	Nur Adrianna Hazeri	(Singapore)	3 July 2006 (age 19)	(Singapore) Tanjong Pagar United (W)	2025	2025
24	Hailey Cheung	(Singapore) (Hong Kong)		(Singapore)	2025	2025
25	Tasneem Khozem	(Singapore)		(Singapore)	2025	2025
Midfielders
8	Victoria Tan	(Singapore)		(Singapore)	2024	2025
9	Nasriah Ibrahim	(Singapore)	1 September 2004 (age 21)	(Singapore) Balestier Khalsa (W)	2024	2025
11	Siti Nurfarah	(Singapore)		(Singapore) Warriors FC	2024	2025
13	Winette Lim Siu	(Singapore)	20 May 1999 (age 27)	(Singapore) Tiong Bahru FC (W)	2023	2025
14	Nisreen Aziz	(Singapore)	20 May 2008 (age 18)	(Singapore) ESA Academy	2025	2025
17	Lily Rozana Joehann Aung	(Singapore) (Myanmar)		(Singapore) Tiong Bahru FC (W)	2025	2025
19	Fatin Nur Syaraf	(Singapore)		(Singapore)	2025	2025
21	Rochelle Chan Wan Wen	(Singapore)	21 August 1995 (age 30)	(Singapore) Tiong Bahru FC (W)	2023	2025
27	Riddle Reneelyn Sison	(Philippines) (Singapore)		(Singapore) Tiong Bahru FC (W)	2023	2025
Strikers
4	Raudhah Kamis	(Singapore)	4 March 1999 (age 27)	(Singapore) Tiong Bahru FC (W)	2023	2025
7	Sydney Hector	(Canada)	27 January 1997 (age 29)	(Singapore) Balestier Khalsa (W)	2024	2025
10	Faith Ho Xin Ning	(Singapore)	14 October 2005 (age 20)	(Singapore)	2024	2025
12	Claire Marie Tay	(Singapore)	14 January 2000 (age 26)	(Singapore) Still Aerion Women's	2024	2025
20	Clae Kho	(Singapore)		(Singapore) Tiong Bahru FC (W)	2025	2025
Players who left mid-season
4	Nurul Asyiqin	(Singapore)		(Singapore) Tiong Bahru FC (W)	2023	2024
5	Jacklyn Lee Pei Xian	(Singapore)		(Singapore) Tiong Bahru FC (W)	2023	
7	Deborah Chin Ngeet Ling	(Singapore)	21 April 1988 (age 38)	(Singapore) Tiong Bahru FC (W)	2023	
14	Nur Izyani Ghani	(Singapore)	2 October 1987 (age 38)	(Singapore) Police SA	2024	
15	Siti Wan Nabilah	(Singapore)	15 May 1993 (age 33)	(Singapore) Tiong Bahru FC (W)	2023	2024
17	Victoria Lee Chun Hui	(Singapore)		(Singapore) Tiong Bahru FC (W)	2023	
18	Nurul Ardian Baharrudin	(Singapore)			2024	
19	Nicole Lim Yan Xiu	(Singapore)	10 April 2002 (age 24)	(Singapore) Lion City Sailors (W)	2023	
20	Rena Ang En Ting	(Singapore)		(Singapore) Tiong Bahru FC (W)	2023	
22	Joey Cheng Yu Ying	(Singapore)	6 November 1993 (age 32)	(Singapore) Police SA	2024	
99	Sitianiwati Rosielin	(Singapore)	26 May 1997 (age 29)	(Singapore) Police SA	2024	
25	Azura Azlan (G)	(Singapore)	12 May 2003 (age 23)	(Singapore)	2023	
	Bisesh Gurung	(Singapore)		(Singapore) Geylang International (W)	2024	

== Coaching staff ==
First Team

Position	Name	Ref.
General Manager	(Singapore)	
Team Manager	(Singapore)	
Head Coach (Men)	(Singapore) Robert Eziakor	
Assistant Coach	(England) Hamid Raeiskarimi	
Goalkeeping Coach	(Singapore) (Australia) Scott Starr	
Fitness Coach	(Singapore) Rosman Sulaiman	
Sports Trainer	(Singapore) Thomas Pang	
Physiotherapist	(Singapore) Seishen Gerard	
Equipment Team	(Singapore) Richard Lim (Singapore) Wan Azlan Bin Wan Adanan	

Youth and Women Team

Position	Name	Ref.
Team Manager (Women)	(Singapore) Angelyn Pang	
Head Coach (Women)	(Singapore) G.Sivaraj	
Head of Youth (COE) & U21 Coach	(Croatia) Marko Kraljevic	
U17 Coach	(England) Hamid Raeiskarimi	
U15 Coach	(Singapore) Firdaus Mohamed	
U13 Coach	(Singapore) Hairil Amin	

== Transfers ==
=== In ===
Preseason

Position	Player	Transferred From	Team	Ref
GK	(Singapore) Kenji Syed Rusydi	(Singapore) Tanjong Pagar United	First Team	Free
DF	(Serbia) Ensar Brunčević	(Serbia) FK Novi Pazar (S1)	First Team	Undisclosed
DF	(Bosnia and Herzegovina) Faris Hasić	(Bosnia and Herzegovina) FK Mladost Doboj Kakanj (B2)	First Team	Free
DF	(Serbia) Ismail Salihović	(Serbia) FK Josanica (S3)	First Team	Free
DF	(Singapore) Nazhiim Harman	(Singapore) Geylang International	First team	Free
DF	(Singapore) Danish Irfan	(Singapore) Tampines Rovers	First Team	Free
DF	(Singapore) Adam Reefdy	(Singapore) Tampines Rovers U21	First Team	Free
DF	(Singapore) Adam Ali	(Singapore) Tampines Rovers U21	U21	Free
DF	(Singapore) Danie Hafiy	(Singapore) Lion City Sailors U21	U21	Free
DF	(Singapore) Gabriel Goh	(Japan) Albirex Niigata (S) U21	U21	Free
DF	(Singapore) Callum Rhys Tam	(Singapore) Tampines Rovers U15	U17	Free
MF	(Japan) Shodai Yokoyama	(Japan) Albirex Niigata (S)	First Team	Free
MF	(Singapore) Justin Hui	(Singapore) Lion City Sailors	First Team	Free
MF	(England) Charlie Taylor	(Singapore) Lion City Sailors U17	U21	Free
FW	(Singapore) Zamani Zamri	(Japan) Albirex Niigata (S)	First Team	Free
FW	(Croatia) Stjepan Plazonja	(Bosnia and Herzegovina) NK Široki Brijeg (B1)	First Team	Free
FW	(Bosnia and Herzegovina) Petar Banović	(Bosnia and Herzegovina) HNK Tomislav (B2)	First Team	Free
FW	(Montenegro) (Serbia) Dejan Račić	(Montenegro) FK Mornar (M1)	First Team	Free

Mid-season

Position	Player	Transferred From	Team	Ref
DF	(Montenegro) (Croatia) Jovan Mugoša	(Montenegro) FK Igalo 1929 (M2)	First Team	Free
DF	(Brazil) Daniel Alemão	(Philippines) Cebu (P1)	First Team	Free
DF	(Singapore) Tajeli Salamat	(Singapore) Balestier Khalsa	First team	Free
DF	(Singapore) (Nigeria) Levi Faris	(Singapore) Sailors Development Center U17	U21	Free
DF	(Singapore) Iman Haziq	(Singapore) Sailors Development Center U17	U21	Free
MF	(Singapore) Zulfahmi Arifin	(Indonesia) Bhayangkara	First Team	Free
MF	(Singapore) Shahreez Basheer	(Singapore) Balestier Khalsa U21	U21	Free
FW	(Singapore) Irfan Iskandar	(Singapore) SAFSA	U21	Free

Postseason

Position	Player	Transferred from	Team	Ref
FW	(Thailand) Settawut Wongsai	(Thailand) Phrae United (T2)	First Team	Free

=== Loan return ===
Preseason

Position	Player	Transferred from	Team	Ref
GK	(Singapore) Heng How Meng	(Singapore) SAFSA	U21	End of NS (Note: Heng How Meng released after end of contract.)
DF	(Singapore) Sahffee Jubpre	(Singapore) SAFSA	U21	End of NS (Note: Sahffee Jubpre released after end of contract.)
MF	(Singapore) Nikesh Singh Sidhu	(Singapore) SAFSA	U21	End of NS
MF	(Singapore) (Wales) Harhys Stewart	(Singapore) Young Lions FC	U21	End of loan (Note: Harhys Stewart released after end of contract and moved to BG Pathum United before joining Chiangrai United on loan.)
FW	(Singapore) Syafi’ie Redzuan	(Singapore) Young Lions FC	First Team	End of loan (Note: Syafi’ie Redzuan released after end of contract and joined Albirex Niigata (S).)

Mid-season

Position	Player	Transferred from	Team	Ref
GK	(Singapore) Aizil Yazid	(Singapore) SAFSA	First Team	End of NS
MF	(Singapore) Farhan Zulkifli	(Singapore) SAFSA	First Team	End of NS
MF	(Singapore) Hafizzuan Riduan	(Singapore) SAFSA	End of NS	
MF	(Singapore) Woo Chun Wei	(Singapore) SAFSA	End of NS	

=== Loan in ===
Preseason

Position	Player	Transferred To / From	Team	Ref
DF	(Singapore) Danie Hafiy	(Singapore) Lion City Sailors U21	U21	Season loan
MF	(Singapore) Yasir Nizamudin	(Singapore) Lion City Sailors U21	U21	Season loan
MF	(Thailand) Puttipat Kaewsawad	(Austria) SKN St. Pölten	First Team	Loan till Nov 2024

Mid-season

Position	Player	Transferred To / From	Team	Ref
MF	(Thailand) Parinya Kaochukiat	(Thailand) Chonburi F.C.	First Team	Loan till May 2025
MF	(Thailand) Ratthathammanun Deeying	(Thailand) Chonburi F.C.	First Team	Loan till May 2025

=== Out ===
Preseason

Position	Player	Transferred To	Team	Ref
GK	(Singapore) Zainol Gulam	(Japan) Albirex Niigata (S)	First Team	Free
GK	(Singapore) Belle Jaffar	Retired	Women	Free
DF	(Japan) Kazuma Takayama	Retired	First Team	Free
DF	(Japan) Naoki Kuriyama	Retired	First Team	Free
DF	(Singapore) Irwan Shah	Retired	First Team	N.A.
DF	(Singapore) Abdil Qaiyyim Mutalib	(Singapore) Balestier Khalsa	First Team	Free
DF	(Singapore) Wong Ngang Haang	(Singapore) Young Lions FC	U21	Free
DF	(Singapore) Harriz Danial	(Japan) Albirex Niigata (S)	U21	Free
DF	(Singapore) (Indonesia) Nasrul Pujiyono	(Singapore) Tengah FC	U21	Free
MF	(Singapore) Umar Ramle	(Singapore) Tanjong Pagar United	First Team	Free
MF	(Singapore) Amir Zailani	(Singapore) Katong FC (SFL1)	First Team	Free
MF	(Singapore) Idraki Adnan	(Japan) Albirex Niigata (S)	First Team	Free
MF	(Singapore) Ashvin Vela	(Japan) Albirex Niigata (S)	U21	Free
MF	(Singapore) (Wales) Harhys Stewart	(Thailand) BG Pathum United F.C.	U21	Free
MF	(Singapore) Shahreez Basheer	(Singapore) Balestier Khalsa U21	U21	Free
MF	(Singapore) Putera Danish	(Singapore)	U21	Free
MF	(Singapore) Syed Adel Alsree	(Singapore)	U21	Free
MF	(Singapore) Snir Shalev	(Singapore)	U21	Free
MF	(Singapore) Afzal Halim	(Singapore)	U21	Free
MF	(Singapore) Raimi Ishraq	(Singapore)	U21	Free
MF	(Singapore) Hariysh Krishnakumar	Singapore Cricket Club (SFL1)	U21	Free
FW	(Singapore) Amy Recha	(Japan) Albirex Niigata (S)	First Team	Free
FW	(Singapore) Sahil Suhaimi	(Singapore) Tanjong Pagar United	First Team	Free
FW	(Singapore) Fairoz Hassan	(Singapore) Geylang Serai FC (IWL)	First Team	Free
FW	(Serbia) Đorđe Maksimović	(Greece) Kozani F.C. (G2)	First Team	Free
FW	(Singapore) Dylan Choo Chi Tao	(Singapore)	U21	Free
FW	(Singapore) Clara Lau Shi Hui	(Australia) Spring Hills FC (A2)	Women	Free
FW	(Singapore) Rachel Chan Le Ying	(Singapore) Tanjong Pagar United (W)	Women	Free

Mid-season

Position	Player	Transferred To	Team	Ref
DF	(Serbia) Ensar Brunčević	(Serbia) FK Novi Pazar	First Team	Free
DF	(Bosnia and Herzegovina) Faris Hasić	(Bosnia and Herzegovina) FK Gornji Rahic (B2)	First Team	Free
MF	(Croatia) Kristijan Krajcek		First Team	Free
MF	(Singapore) Nikesh Singh Sidhu	(Singapore)	First Team	Free
MF	(England) Charlie Taylor	(United States) Upper Iowa University	U21	Free
MF	(Singapore) Hafizzuan Riduan	(Singapore)	U21	Free
MF	(Singapore) Woo Chun Wei	(Singapore)	U21	Free
MF	(Singapore) Chia Wayne Hon	(Spain) Rayo Ciudad Alcobendas Academy	U15	Free
MF	(Singapore) Nur Izyani Ghani	(Singapore) Albirex Niigata (S)	Women	Free
MF	(Singapore) Sitianiwati Rosielin	(Singapore) Albirex Niigata (S)	Women	Free
MF	(Singapore) Nurul Asyiqin	(Singapore)	Women	Free
FW	(Bosnia and Herzegovina) Petar Banović	(Bosnia and Herzegovina) HNK Tomislav (B2)	First Team	Free
FW	(Singapore) Siti Wan Nabilah	(Singapore)	Women	Free

=== Loan out ===
Preseason

Position	Player	Transferred To	Ref
GK	(Singapore) Aizil Yazid	(Singapore) SAFSA	NS till Jan 2025
MF	(Singapore) Farhan Zulkifli	(Singapore) SAFSA	NS till Jan 2025
MF	(Singapore) Hafizzuan Riduan	(Singapore) SAFSA	NS till Jan 2025
MF	(Singapore) Woo Chun Wei	(Singapore) SAFSA	NS till Jan 2025
DF	(Singapore) Iryan Fandi	(Singapore) Young Lions	NS till Jan 2026
DF	(Singapore) Nicholas Jordan Sea	(Singapore) SAFSA	NS till July 2026

Mid-season

Position	Player	Transferred To	Ref
GK	(Singapore) (Vietnam) Keith Chung Wen Jie	(Singapore) SAFSA	NS till Sept 2026
MF	(Singapore) Ajay Robson	(Singapore) SAFSA	NS till Nov 2026

=== End of Loan ===
Mid-season

Position	Player	Transferred To	Ref	
MF	(Thailand) Puttipat Kaewsawad	(Austria) SKN St. Pölten	First Team	End of loan
DF	(Singapore) Danie Hafiy	(Singapore) Lion City Sailors U21	U21	End of loan

=== Retained / extension ===
Position	Player	Ref
GK	(Singapore) Zaiful Nizam	1.5 years contract from Jan 2024 till Jun 2025
DF	(Singapore) (Netherlands) Jordan Nicolas Vestering	1.5 years contract from Jan 2024 till Jun 2025
DF	(Singapore) Anders Aplin	1.5 years contract from Jan 2024 till Jun 2025
DF	(Singapore) Nazrul Nazari	1.5 years contract from Jan 2024 till Jun 2025
MF	(Singapore) Shahdan Sulaiman	1.5 years contract from Jan 2024 till Jun 2025
MF	(Singapore) Umar Ramle	1.5 years contract from Jan 2024 till Jun 2025 (Note: Umar Ramle was initially announced to have extend his contract before retiring)
MF	(Croatia) Kristijan Krajcek	1.5 years contract from Jan 2024 till Jun 2025
FW	(Singapore) Hazzuwan Halim	1.5 years contract from Jan 2024 till Jun 2025
FW	(Singapore) Gabriel Quak	1.5 years contract from Jan 2024 till Jun 2025

== Friendly ==
=== Pre-season ===
Win Draw Loss

2024 SPL Interim Tournament – 23 Feb to 21 Apr

23 February 2024 1	Hougang United (Singapore)	3–0	(Singapore) Lion City Sailors	Bishan
	Ajay Robson 12'; Iryan Fandi 28'; Shodai Yokoyama 60'		(red card) 89'	Stadium: Bishan Stadium

2 March 2024 2	Hougang United (Singapore)	0–3	(Singapore) BG Tampines Rovers	Jalan Besar
			Joel Chew 7'; Boris Kopitović 85'; Seia Kunori 90+1'	Stadium: Jalan Besar Stadium

8 March 2024 3	Hougang United (Singapore)	3–0	(Singapore) Geylang International	Jalan Besar
	Danish Irfan 43'; Nazrul Nazari 45'; Zamani Zamri 70'			Stadium: Jalan Besar Stadium

14 April 2024 4	Hougang United (Singapore)	2–3	(Singapore) Young Lions FC	Jalan Besar
	Ensar Brunčević 51'; Gabriel Quak 90+1'		Itsuki Enomoto 37'; Farhan Zulkifli 41'; Amir Syafiz 83'	Stadium: Jalan Besar Stadium

19 April 2024 5	Hougang United (Singapore)	1–0	(Singapore) Tanjong Pagar United	Jalan Besar
	Justin Hui 17'			Stadium: Jalan Besar Stadium

=== SMJ Cup 2024 ===
29 April 2024 1	Sabah F.C. (Malaysia)	2–1	(Singapore) Hougang United	Kota Kinabalu
	Stuart Wilkin 54'; Saddil Ramdani 74'		Stjepan Plazonja 70' (pen.)	Stadium: Likas Stadium

1 May 2024 2	Kuching City F.C. (Malaysia)	1–0	(Singapore) Hougang United	Kota Kinabalu
	Kipré Tchétché 57'			Stadium: Likas Stadium

3 May 2024 3	Kuala Lumpur City F.C. (Malaysia)	1–0	(Singapore) Hougang United	Kota Kinabalu
	Suhaimi Abu 90+4'			Stadium: Likas Stadium

5 May 2024 3rd/4th	Kuching City F.C. (Malaysia)	2–0	(Singapore) Hougang United	Kota Kinabalu
	Alauddin Farid Atan 18'; Jordan Mintah 43'			Stadium: Likas Stadium

== Team statistics ==
=== Appearances and goals ===
As of 24 May 2025

No.	Pos.	Player	SPL		Singapore Cup		Total	
No.	Pos.	Player	Apps.	Goals	Apps.	Goals	Apps.	Goals
2	DF	(Singapore) (England) Anders Aplin	7	0	1+1	0	9	0
3	DF	(Singapore) (Netherlands) Jordan Vestering	23+1	1	3+1	0	28	1
4	DF	(Singapore) Nazrul Nazari	23+1	0	4	0	28	0
5	DF	(Singapore) Danish Irfan	11+7	0	1+1	0	20	0
7	FW	(Singapore) Hazzuwan Halim	18+7	2	1+1	0	27	2
8	MF	(Singapore) Shahdan Sulaiman	28+2	2	3+1	1	34	3
9	FW	(Croatia) Stjepan Plazonja	26+1	14	3+1	1	31	15
11	MF	(Japan) Shodai Yokoyama	32	5	3+1	1	36	6
12	GK	(Singapore) Kenji Syed Rusydi	2+1	0	2	0	5	0
14	DF	(Serbia) Ismail Salihović	14+6	0	3	0	23	0
17	MF	(Singapore) Justin Hui	2+7	0	0	0	9	0
19	GK	(Singapore) Zaiful Nizam	26+1	0	2	0	29	0
21	DF	(Singapore) Nazhiim Harman	12+4	1	1	0	17	1
22	MF	(Singapore) Gabriel Quak	6+17	2	2+1	0	26	2
23	DF	(Brazil) Daniel Alemão	11	2	4	1	15	3
24	MF	(Singapore) Zamani Zamri	0+8	0	0	0	8	0
27	MF	(Singapore) Farhan Zulkifli	3+9	3	1+3	0	14	3
30	FW	(Montenegro) Dejan Račić	27+1	24	3	2	31	26
31	DF	(Singapore) Tajeli Salamat	9+1	0	2	0	12	0
33	DF	(Montenegro) (Croatia) Jovan Mugoša	3	1	1	0	4	1
37	MF	(Singapore) Zulfahmi Arifin	10	1	4	1	14	2
55	DF	(Singapore) Rauf Sanizal	0+1	0	0	0	1	0
56	MF	(Singapore) (France) Louka Vaissierre Tan Jun Cheng	0+10	0	0+2	1	12	1
61	GK	(Singapore) Isaac Jonathan Lee	0	0	0+1	0	1	0
62	DF	(Singapore) Adam Reefdy	3+6	0	0	0	9	0
64	MF	(Thailand) Ratthathammanun Deeying	4+1	0	0	0	5	0
65	MF	(Thailand) Parinya Kaochukiat	0+2	0	0	0	2	0
Players who have played this season but had left the club or on loan to other club
6	MF	(Thailand) Puttipat Kaewsawad	0+4	0	0	0	4	0
10	MF	(Croatia) Kristijan Krajcek	0	0	0	0	0	0
15	DF	(Serbia) Ensar Brunčević	19	1	0	0	19	1
16	MF	(Singapore) Ajay Robson	8+9	0	0	0	17	0
18	MF	(Singapore) Nikesh Singh Sidhu	0	0	0	0	0	0
20	DF	(Bosnia and Herzegovina) Faris Hasić	17	0	0	0	17	0
44	FW	(Bosnia and Herzegovina) Petar Banović	3+8	1	0	0	11	1

== Competitions ==
=== Overview ===
Results summary (SPL)

Overall								Home						Away					
Pld	W	D	L	GF	GA	GD	Pts	W	D	L	GF	GA	GD	W	D	L	GF	GA	GD
0	0	0	0	0	0	0	0	0	0	0	0	0	0	0	0	0	0	0	0

=== Singapore Premier League ===
Win Draw Loss

10 May 2024 1	Hougang United (Singapore)	1–4	(Singapore) Lion City Sailors	Jalan Besar
	Hazzuwan Halim 34' (penalty missed) 34		Bart Ramselaar 23'; Shawal Anuar 25'; Adam Swandi 58'; Obren Kljajic 88' (yellow card) 21'	Stadium: Jalan Besar Stadium; Referee: Andrea Verolino; Man of the Match: (Singapore) Shawal Anuar

18 May 2024 2	Albirex Niigata (S) (Japan)	1–0	(Singapore) Hougang United	Jurong East
	Shuhei Hoshino 7'; Daniel Goh (yellow card) 46'; Syed Firdaus Hassan (yellow card) 49'; Hassan Sunny (red card) 60'; Arya Igami Tarhani (yellow card) 90+6'		Hazzuwan Halim (yellow card) 71'	Stadium: Jurong East Stadium; Referee: Taufik Thana; Man of the Match: (Japan) (Nigeria) Stevia Egbus Mikuni

26 May 2024 3	Tanjong Pagar United (Singapore)	1–1	(Singapore) Hougang United	Jurong East
	Stefan Paunovic 87' (yellow card) 8'; Akram Azman (yellow card) 37'; Shahrin Saberin (yellow card) 75'; Rezza Rezky (red card) 90+1'		Jordan Vestering 90+4'	Stadium: Jurong East Stadium; Referee: Ahmad A'Qashah; Man of the Match: (Serbia) Stefan Paunovic

14 June 2024 4	Hougang United (Singapore)	2–6	(Singapore) Geylang International	Jalan Besar
	Dejan Račić 65'; Stjepan Plazonja 71'; Ajay Robson (yellow card) 15'; Ensar Brunčević (yellow card) 47'		Tomoyuki Doi 13', 61', 87'; Faris Hasic 39' (o.g.); Zikos Chua 83', 85'; Akmal Azman (yellow card) 18'	Stadium: Jalan Besar Stadium; Referee: Zulfiqar Bin Mustaffa; Man of the Match: (Japan) Tomoyuki Doi

21 June 2024 5	Hougang United (Singapore)	3–3	(Singapore) Balestier Khalsa	Jalan Besar
	Dejan Račić 65' 90+5'; Shahdan Sulaiman 85'; Danish Irfan (yellow card) 55'		Ismail Sassi 42'; Kodai Tanaka 57' (pen.) 61' (yellow card) 62'; Jordan Emaviwe (yellow card) 54'	Stadium: Jalan Besar Stadium; Referee: Oswind Suriya; Man of the Match: (Montenegro) Dejan Račić

30 June 2024 6	BG Tampines Rovers (Singapore)	5–1	(Singapore) Hougang United	Jalan Besar
	Glenn Kweh 11'; Faris Ramli 46'; Irfan Najeeb 54', 82'; Boris Kopitović 68'; Taufik Suparno (yellow card) 88'		Dejan Račić 24'; Ajay Robson (yellow card) 13'; Faris Hasic (yellow card) 51'; Justin Hui (yellow card) 81'; Adam Reefdy (yellow card) 89'	Stadium: Jalan Besar Stadium; Referee: Ahmad A'Qashah; Man of the Match: (Singapore) Irfan Najeeb

14 July 2024 7	Hougang United (Singapore)	2–2	(Singapore) Young Lions FC	Jalan Besar
	Hazzuwan Halim 47'; Nur Adam Abdullah 79' (o.g.); Ismail Salihovic (yellow card) 36'; Jordan Vestering (yellow card) 63'; Nazrul Nazari (yellow card) 67'; Ajay Robson (yellow card) 84'		Jun Kobayashi 31'; Itsuki Enomoto 67'	Stadium: Jalan Besar Stadium; Referee: Farhan Mohd; Man of the Match: (Japan) Jun Kobayashi

19 July 2024 8	DPMM FC (Brunei)	1–1	(Singapore) Hougang United	Bandar Seri Begawan
	Nazirrudin Ismail 62'; Azwan Ali Rahman (yellow card) 34'; Syafiq Safiuddin (yellow card) 41'; Yura Indera Putera (yellow card) 59'; Abdul Mu'iz Sisa (yellow card) 90+2'		Stjepan Plazonja 42'; Nazrul Nazari (yellow card) 25'; Ismail Salihović (yellow card) 60'; Nazhiim Harman (yellow card) 74'; Zaiful Nizam (yellow card) 90+2'	Stadium: Hassanal Bolkiah National Stadium; Referee: Muhammad Taqi; Man of the Match: (Singapore) Kenji Syed Rusydi

23 July 2024 9	Hougang United (Singapore)	1–0	(Japan) Albirex Niigata (S)	Jalan Besar
	Stjepan Plazonja 78'; Faris Hasić (yellow card) 32'		Ho Wai Loon (yellow card) 37'	Stadium: Jalan Besar Stadium; Referee: Ahmad A'Qashah; Man of the Match: (Croatia) Stjepan Plazonja

28 July 2024 10	Lion City Sailors (Singapore)	7–1	(Singapore) Hougang United	Bishan
	Bailey Wright 12'; Song Ui-young 20'; Shawal Anuar 45+1'; Toni Datković 52'; Maxime Lestienne 55' (pen.); Lennart Thy 61', 80'; Lionel Tan (yellow card) 58'		Stjepan Plazonja 10'; Faris Hasić (yellow card) 73'	Stadium: Bishan Stadium; Referee: Clarence Leow; Man of the Match: (Germany) Lennart Thy

2 August 2024 11	Geylang International (Singapore)	0–1	(Singapore) Hougang United	Jalan Besar
			Dejan Račić 36'; Ensar Brunčević (yellow card) 69'; Petar Banović (yellow card) 89'	Stadium: Jalan Besar Stadium; Referee: Oswind Suriya; Man of the Match: (Montenegro) Dejan Račić

11 August 2024 12	Hougang United (Singapore)	5–1	(Singapore) Tanjong Pagar United	Jalan Besar
	Dejan Račić 22', 28', 74'; Stjepan Plazonja 83', 90+1'; Ismail Salihović (yellow card) 39'; Zamani Zamri (yellow card) 88'		Salif Cissé 41'; Shahrin Saberin (yellow card) 69'	Stadium: Jalan Besar Stadium; Referee: Jansen Foo; Man of the Match: (Croatia) Stjepan Plazonja

23 August 2024 13	Balestier Khalsa (Singapore)	3–1	(Singapore) Hougang United	Bishan
	Ismail Sassi 6'; Riku Fukashiro 53' (yellow card) 90+5'; Alen Kozar 62'; Madhu Mohana (yellow card) 19'; Hafiz Ahmad (yellow card) 90+2'		Dejan Račić 21'; Hazzuwan Halim (yellow card) 29'; Stjepan Plazonja (yellow card) 83'; Shodai Yokoyama (yellow card) 90+3'	Stadium: Bishan Stadium; Referee: Taufik Thana; Man of the Match: (Japan) Riku Fukashiro

30 August 2024 14	Hougang United (Singapore)	1–1	(Singapore) BG Tampines Rovers	Jalan Besar
	Ensar Brunčević 31'; Ismail Salihović (yellow card) 32' (yellow-red card) 90+3'; Stjepan Plazonja (yellow card) 90+1'		Seia Kunori 44'; Taufik Suparno (red card) 90'; Shah Shahiran (yellow card) 90+5'	Stadium: Jalan Besar Stadium; Referee: Hilmi Fuad; Man of the Match: (Serbia) Ensar Brunčević

21 September 2024 15	Young Lions FC (Singapore)	4–4	(Singapore) Hougang United	Jalan Besar
	Kan Kobayashi 9', 83'; Fathullah Rahmat 34'; Itsuki Enomoto 77' (pen.)		Shodai Yokoyama 11'; Dejan Račić 19', 45'; Stjepan Plazonja 45+7'; Jordan Vestering (yellow card) 88'; Petar Banović (yellow card) 88'	Stadium: Jalan Besar Stadium; Referee: Clarence Leow; Man of the Match: (Singapore) Fathullah Rahmat

27 September 2024 16	Hougang United (Singapore)	2–2	(Brunei) DPMM FC	Jalan Besar
	Stjepan Plazonja 74'; Dejan Račić 90+5'; Ismail Salihović (yellow card) 18'; Nazhiim Harman (yellow card) 31'; Marko Kraljević (yellow card) 75'		Julio Cruz 12' (pen.); Ismail Salihović 15' (o.g.); Farshad Noor (yellow card) 38'; Azwan Ali Rahman (yellow card) 61' (yellow-red card) 80'	Stadium: Jalan Besar Stadium; Referee: Hilmi Fuad; Man of the Match: (Croatia) Stjepan Plazonja

19 October 2024 17	Lion City Sailors (Singapore)	3–1	(Singapore) Hougang United	Bishan
	Song Ui-young 15' (yellow card) 45+1'; Lennart Thy 17', 68'; Lionel Tan (yellow card) 47'; Hariss Harun (yellow card) 55'		Dejan Račić 5'; Ensar Brunčević (yellow card) 53'; Nazrul Nazari (yellow card) 60'	Stadium: Bishan Stadium; Referee: Jansen Foo; Man of the Match: (Germany) Lennart Thy

29 October 2024 18	Albirex Niigata (S) (Japan)	2–1	(Singapore) Hougang United	Jurong East
	Yohei Otake 85'; Shingo Nakano 90+2' (pen.); Yojiro Takahagi (yellow card) 90+3'; Ryhan Stewart (yellow card) 90+7'; Hassan Sunny (yellow card) 90+10'		Stjepan Plazonja 42' (yellow card) 90+5'; Jordan Vestering (yellow card) 59'; Ensar Brunčević (yellow card) 90'; Dejan Račić (yellow card) 90+5'; Shodai Yokoyama (yellow card) 90+7'	Stadium: Jurong East Stadium; Referee: Ahmad A'Qashah; Man of the Match: (Japan) Yohei Otake

1 November 2024 19	Hougang United (Singapore)	6–0	(Singapore) Tanjong Pagar United	Jalan Besar
	Shahdan Sulaiman 9'; Dejan Račić 10', 78' (pen.); Nazhiim Harman 47'; Gabriel Quak 66'; Petar Banović 88'		Faizal Roslan (yellow card) 40'; Sahil Suhaimi (yellow card) 45+2'; Shahrin Saberin (yellow card) 77'; Jaslee Hatta (yellow card) 87'	Stadium: Jalan Besar Stadium; Referee: Hilmi Fuad; Man of the Match: (Montenegro) Dejan Račić

24 November 2024 20 (Rescheduled)	Hougang United (Singapore)	2–3	(Singapore) Geylang International	Jalan Besar
	Dejan Račić 18'; Shodai Yokoyama 31'; Danish Irfan (yellow card) 43'; Zulfahmi Arifin (yellow card) 45+2'; Nazhiim Harman (yellow card) 71'		Tomoyuki Doi 45'; Ryoya Taniguchi 53'; Joshua Pereira 65'; Vincent Bezecourt (yellow card) 35'; Shakir Hamzah (yellow card) 69'	Stadium: Jalan Besar Stadium; Referee: Jansen Foo; Man of the Match: (Singapore) Joshua Pereira

19 January 2025 21	Hougang United (Singapore)	3–1	(Singapore) Balestier Khalsa	Jalan Besar
	Jovan Mugoša 1' (yellow card) 51'; Dejan Račić 32'; Stjepan Plazonja 75' (yellow card) 40'; Zaiful Nizam (yellow card) 90+6'		Madhu Mohana 45+4'	Stadium: Jalan Besar Stadium; Referee: Oswind Suriya; Man of the Match: (Singapore) Zaiful Nizam

25 January 2025 22	BG Tampines Rovers (Singapore)	2–4	(Singapore) Hougang United	Jalan Besar
	Taufik Suparno 13'; Seia Kunori 58'; Miloš Zlatković (yellow card) 68'		Stjepan Plazonja 11'; Zulfahmi Arifin 21' (yellow card) 90+1'; Gabriel Quak 89'; Dejan Račić 90+5' (pen.); Daniel Alemão (yellow card) 52'	Stadium: Jalan Besar Stadium; Referee: Ahmad A'Qashah; Man of the Match: (Montenegro) Dejan Račić

22 February 2025 23	Hougang United (Singapore)	3–3	(Singapore) Young Lions FC	Jalan Besar
	Daniel Alemão 8'; Dejan Račić 32'; Farhan Zulkifli 71'; Tajeli Salamat (yellow card) 4'; Anders Aplin (yellow card) 38'		Danish Qayyum 5'; Amir Syafiz 23', 44'	Stadium: Jalan Besar Stadium; Referee: Zulfiqar Mustaffa; Man of the Match: (Singapore) Fairuz Fazli

26 February 2025 24	DPMM FC (Brunei)	2–1	(Singapore) Hougang United	Jalan Besar
	Dāvis Ikaunieks 20', 60' (pen.); Hanif Farhan Azman (red card) 82'; Nazirrudin Ismail (yellow card) 85' (yellow-red card)		Farhan Zulkifli 89' (pen.); Dejan Račić (penalty missed) 82; Zulfahmi Arifin (red card) 40'	Stadium: Jalan Besar Stadium (Note: Match rescheduled and location changed due to broadcasting issues in Hassanal Bolkiah National Stadium); Referee: Oswind Suriya; Man of the Match: (Latvia) Dāvis Ikaunieks

9 March 2025 25	Hougang United (Singapore)	1–1	(Singapore) Lion City Sailors	Jalan Besar
	Shodai Yokoyama 27'; Stjepan Plazonja (yellow card) 52'; Jordan Vestering (yellow card) 82'		Maxime Lestienne 20'; Akram Azman (yellow card) 67'	Stadium: Jalan Besar Stadium; Referee: Ahmad A'Qashah; Man of the Match: (Croatia) Stjepan Plazonja

5 April 2025 26	Hougang United (Singapore)	1–0	(Japan) Albirex Niigata (S)	Jalan Besar
	Dejan Račić 74'; Stjepan Plazonja (yellow card) 50'; Shahdan Sulaiman (yellow card) 59'			Stadium: Jalan Besar Stadium; Referee: Andrea Verolino; Man of the Match: (Montenegro) Dejan Račić

11 April 2025 27	Geylang International (Singapore)	4–3	(Singapore) Hougang United	Jalan Besar
	Naqiuddin Eunos 11'; Tomoyuki Doi 24', 81', 90+3'; Joshua Pereira (yellow card) 33'; Saifullah Akbar (yellow card) 45+1'		Dejan Račić 35' (pen.); Farhan Zulkifli 77'; Daniel Alemão 90+2'	Stadium: Jalan Besar Stadium; Referee: Zulfiqar Mustaffa; Man of the Match: (Japan) Tomoyuki Doi

13 May 2025 28 (Rescheduled)	Tanjong Pagar United (Singapore)	1–1	(Singapore) Hougang United	Jurong East
	Faizal Roslan 73'; Timur Talipov (red card) 19'; Azim Akbar (yellow card) 82'		Dejan Račić 42'; Anders Aplin (yellow card) 23'; Zulfahmi Arifin (yellow card) 31'; Ratthathammanun Deeying (yellow card) 52'; Daniel Alemão (yellow card) 58' (yellow-red card) 61'; Tajeli Salamat (yellow card) 81'; Jordan Vestering (yellow card) 89'	Stadium: Jurong East Stadium; Referee: Hilmi Fuad; Man of the Match: (Singapore) Zaiful Nizam

24 April 2025 29 (Rescheduled)	Balestier Khalsa (Singapore)	2–1	(Singapore) Hougang United	Tampines
	Anton Fase 10'; Riku Fukashiro 70'; Darren Teh (yellow card) 29'; Madhu Mohana (yellow card) 88'		Stjepan Plazonja 53'; Dejan Račić (yellow card) 45'; Ismail Salihović (yellow card) 67'; Anders Aplin (yellow card) 90+1'; Tajeli Salamat (yellow card) 90+5'	Stadium: Our Tampines Hub (Note: Match rescheduled and location changed to Our Tampines Hub due to General Election 2025 and potential closures of selected ActiveSG facilities, including stadiums that are typically used for SPL fixtures); Referee: Andrea Verolino; Man of the Match: (Japan) Kodai Tanaka

2 May 2025 30	Hougang United (Singapore)	1–4	(Singapore) BG Tampines Rovers	Tampines
	Stjepan Plazonja 4'; Hazzuwan Halim (yellow card) 43'; Jordan Vestering (yellow card) 63'; Ismail Salihović (yellow card) 84'		Itsuki Enomoto 37', 53'; Seia Kunori 47' (yellow card) 36'; Taufik Suparno 87' (yellow card) 82'; Shuya Yamashita (yellow card) 76'	Stadium: Our Tampines Hub (Note: Location changed to Our Tampines Hub due to General Election 2025 and potential closures of selected ActiveSG facilities, including stadiums that are typically used for SPL fixtures); Referee: Clarence Leow; Man of the Match: (Japan) Itsuki Enomoto

19 May 2025 31 (Rescheduled)	Young Lions FC (Singapore)	4–3	(Singapore) Hougang United	Jalan Besar
	Amir Syafiz 21'; Kan Kobayashi 73', 90+3', 90+6'; Danish Haqimi (yellow card) 19'; Ikram Mikhail Mustaqim (yellow card) 59'; Jun Kobayashi (red card) 75'; Ryu Hardy Yussri (yellow card) 85'		Stjepan Plazonja 16'; Shodai Yokoyama 59'; Dejan Račić 88'; Nazhiim Harman (yellow card) 6'; Nazrul Nazari (yellow card) 61'; Zulfahmi Arifin (yellow card) 70'; Parinya Kaochukiat (yellow card) 79'	Stadium: Jalan Besar Stadium; Referee: Oswind Suriya; Man of the Match: (Japan) Kan Kobayashi

23 May 2025 32	Hougang United (Singapore)	2–3	(Brunei) DPMM FC	Jalan Besar
	Shodai Yokoyama 2' (yellow card) 80'; Dejan Račić 68'; Danish Irfan (yellow card) 9'; Parinya Kaochukiat (yellow card) 90+6'		Dāvis Ikaunieks 18', 46'; Miguel Oliveira 78'; Hanif Hamir (yellow card) 49'; Faturrahman Embran (yellow card) 80'	Stadium: Jalan Besar Stadium; Referee: Jansen Foo; Man of the Match: (Latvia) Dāvis Ikaunieks

Pos	Team	Pld	W	D	L	GF	GA	GD	Pts	Qualification or relegation
1	Lion City Sailors (C)	32	22	6	4	96	32	+64	72	Qualification for Champions League Two group stage & ASEAN Club Championship (Note: Since the winners of the 2024–25 Singapore Cup, Lion City Sailors, had already qualified for the AFC Champions League Two and ASEAN Club Championship, the spot given to the Singapore Cup winners (Champions League Two) was passed to the second-placed team.)
2	BG Tampines Rovers	32	19	7	6	84	37	+47	64	Qualification for Champions League Two group stage & ASEAN Club Championship
3	Geylang International	32	15	9	8	97	64	+33	54	
4	Balestier Khalsa	32	14	6	12	84	80	+4	48	
5	DPMM (Note: Ineligible for AFC competition spots)	32	12	8	12	54	61	−7	44	Transferred to the 2025–26 Malaysia Super League post-season
6	Albirex Niigata (S)	32	13	3	16	55	71	−16	42	
7	Hougang United	32	7	10	15	61	76	−15	31	
8	Young Lions	32	7	8	17	47	89	−42	29	
9	Tanjong Pagar United	32	3	7	22	35	103	−68	16	

Updated to match(es) played on 25 May 2025. Source: Singapore Premier League
Rules for classification: 1) points; 2) goal difference; 3) number of goals scored; 4) number of wins
(C) Champions

=== Singapore Cup ===
Pos	Team	Pld	W	D	L	GF	GA	GD	Pts	Qualification
1	BG Tampines Rovers	4	3	1	0	12	4	+8	10	Semi-finals
2	DPMM	4	2	1	1	7	7	0	7	Semi-finals
3	Young Lions	4	2	0	2	11	7	+4	6	
4	Hougang United	4	2	0	2	8	10	−2	6	
5	Albirex Niigata (S)	4	0	0	4	4	14	−10	0	

Source: FAS

1 February 2025 Group Match 1	Albriex Niigata (S) (Japan)	1–2	(Singapore) Hougang United	Jurong East
	Shingo Nakano 63'	Report	Zulfahmi Arifin 18'; Dejan Račić 21'; Ismail Salihović (yellow card) 22'; Danish Irfan (yellow card) 65'	Stadium: Jurong East Stadium; Referee: Andrea Verolino

1 March 2025 Group Match 2	Hougang United (Singapore)	0–3	(Singapore) Young Lions	Jalan Besar
	Nazrul Nazari (yellow card) 45+3'; Zaiful Nizam (red card) 45+3'		Fairuz Fazli Koh 16'; Kaisei Ogawa 45+4' (pen.); Nazrul Nazari 53' (o.g.)	Stadium: Jalan Besar Stadium; Referee: Farhan Mohd

15 March 2025 Group Match 3	DPMM FC (Brunei)	1–5	(Singapore) Hougang United	Jalan Besar
	Dāvis Ikaunieks 51'; Jamie McAllister (yellow card) 67'; Najib Tarif (yellow card) 70'; Nazry Aiman Azaman (yellow card) 73'; Damir Muminovic (yellow card) 77'; Azwan Ali Rahman (yellow card) 90+5'	Report	Daniel Alemão 21'; Shodai Yokoyama 38'; Shahdan Sulaiman 70'; Dejan Račić 81'; Stjepan Plazonja 90+5'; Ismail Salihović (yellow card) 90+1'	Stadium: Jalan Besar Stadium; Referee: Oswind Suriya

29 March 2025 Group Match 4	Hougang United (Singapore)	1–5	(Singapore) BG Tampines Rovers	Jalan Besar
	Louka Tan 80'		Itsuki Enomoto 50'; Shah Shahiran 65' (pen.); Dylan Fox 82' (yellow card) 55'; Faris Ramli 84', 90+4'	Stadium: Jalan Besar Stadium; Referee: Muhammad Taqi

== Competition (Women's Premier League) ==
=== 2024 Women's Premier League ===
Win Draw Loss

9 March 2024 1	Hougang United FC (Singapore)	4–1	(Singapore) Tampines Rovers	Choa Chu Kang
	Sydney Hector 13'; Reneelyn Sison 15'; Raudhah Kamis 17'; Nasriah Ibrahim 33'	Report	Priscille Le Helloco 3'	Stadium: Choa Chu Kang Stadium

16 March 2024 2	Hougang United FC (Singapore)	2–0	(Singapore) Geylang International	Choa Chu Kang
	Raudhah Kamis 11'; Reneelyn Sison 39'	Report		Stadium: Choa Chu Kang Stadium

14 April 2024 3	Hougang United FC (Singapore)	0–4	(Singapore) Lion City Sailors	Yishun
			Raeka Ee Pei Ying 20'; Nur Izyani 39' (o.g.); Sara Hayduchok 48'; Josephine Ang Kaile 88'	Stadium: Yishun Stadium

21 April 2024 4	Hougang United FC (Singapore)	1–4	(Singapore) Albirex Niigata (S)	Choa Chu Kang
	Nicole Lim 43'	Report	Mulan Ayliffe 22'; Nahwah Aidilreza 56'; Afiqah Omar 84'; Manami Fukuzawa 88'	Stadium: Choa Chu Kang Stadium

27 April 2024 5	Hougang United FC (Singapore)	5–0	(Singapore) Tiong Bahru FC	Choa Chu Kang
	Sydney Hector 8', 24'; Raudhah Kamis 16', 31'; Sitianwati Rosielin 86'	Report		Stadium: Choa Chu Kang Stadium

5 May 2024 6	Hougang United FC (Singapore)	0–0	(Singapore) Tanjong Pagar United	Simei
		Report		Stadium: ITE College East

19 May 2024 7	Hougang United FC (Singapore)	3–0	(Singapore) Balestier Khalsa	Choa Chu Kang
				Stadium: Choa Chu Kang Stadium

22 June 2024 8	Hougang United FC (Singapore)	0–2	(Singapore) Still Aerion	Choa Chu Kang
			Carmen Calisto 68'; Reena Esther 81'	Stadium: Choa Chu Kang Stadium

29 June 2024 9	Hougang United FC (Singapore)	3–1	(Singapore) Tampines Rovers	Choa Chu Kang
				Stadium: Choa Chu Kang Stadium

20 July 2024 10	Hougang United FC (Singapore)	3–3	(Singapore) Geylang International	Choa Chu Kang
	Nasriah Ibrahim; Reneelyn Riddle; Nur Izyani		Summer Chong; Farhanah Ruhaizat; Victoria Sarka	Stadium: Choa Chu Kang Stadium

28 July 2024 11	Hougang United FC (Singapore)	0–3	(Singapore) Lion City Sailors	Choa Chu Kang
		Report	Nur Syazwani Ruzi 68'; Madison Telmer 88', 90+3'	Stadium: Choa Chu Kang Stadium

4 August 2024 12	Hougang United FC (Singapore)	2–3	(Singapore) Albirex Niigata (S)	Choa Chu Kang
	Raudhah Kamis 31', 65'	Report	Nurzaherra Maisarah 42'; Kana Kitahara 47'; Manami Fukuzawa 63'	Stadium: Choa Chu Kang Stadium

10 August 2024 13	Hougang United FC (Singapore)	4–0	(Singapore) Tiong Bahru FC	Choa Chu Kang
	Sydney Hector; Sitianiwati			Stadium: Choa Chu Kang Stadium

18 August 2024 14	Hougang United FC (Singapore)	3–0	(Singapore) Tanjong Pagar United	Choa Chu Kang
	Nur Izyani; Sydney Hector; Nur Raudhah Kamis			Stadium: Choa Chu Kang Stadium

1 September 2024 15	Hougang United FC (Singapore)	0–6	(Singapore) Balestier Khalsa	Choa Chu Kang
	Jacklyn Lee; Nur Izyani; Sydney Hector			Stadium: Choa Chu Kang Stadium

7 September 2024 16	Hougang United FC (Singapore)	1–1	(Singapore) Still Aerion	Choa Chu Kang
			Monessha 34'	Stadium: Choa Chu Kang Stadium; Man of the Match: Monessha

=== League table ===
Pos	Team	Pld	W	D	L	GF	GA	GD	Pts	Qualification or relegation
1	Lion City Sailors (C)	16	14	1	1	95	4	+91	43	Qualification for AFC Champions League
2	Albirex Niigata (S)	16	14	0	2	84	9	+75	42	
3	Geylang International	16	9	4	3	48	16	+32	31	
4	Still Aerion	16	8	4	4	38	27	+11	28	
5	Hougang United	16	8	3	5	37	22	+15	27	
6	Tanjong Pagar United	16	5	2	9	15	25	−10	17	
7	BG Tampines Rovers	16	3	2	11	22	59	−37	11	
8	Tiong Bahru	16	2	1	13	11	81	−70	7	
9	Balestier Khalsa	16	0	1	15	3	110	−107	1	

Updated to match(es) played on 15 September 2024. Source: Women's Premier League
Rules for classification: 1) points; 2) goal difference; 3) number of goals scored; 4) number of wins
(C) League champions

=== 2025 Women's Premier League ===
Win Draw Loss

9 March 2025 1	Hougang United (Singapore)	1–1	(Singapore) Geylang International	Choa Chu Kang
	Sydney Hector		Farah Nurzahirah	Stadium: Choa Chu Kang Stadium

22 March 2025 2	BG Tampines Rovers (Singapore)	2–3	(Singapore) Hougang United	Choa Chu Kang
	Mio Irisawa 89'; Darvina Halini 90'		Nasriah Ibrahim 2'; Riddle Reneelyn Sison 56'; Sydney Hector 69'	Stadium: Choa Chu Kang Stadium

Aug 2025 3 (Rescheduled)	Hougang United (Singapore)	0–1	(Singapore) Tiong Bahru FC	Jalan Besar
			Lim Li Xian	Stadium: Jalan Besar Stadium

13 April 2025 4	Lion City Sailors (Singapore)	0–0	(Singapore) Hougang United	Choa Chu Kang
				Stadium: Choa Chu Kang Stadium

19 April 2025 5	Hougang United (Singapore)	–	(Singapore) Albirex Niigata (S)	Choa Chu Kang
				Stadium: Choa Chu Kang Stadium

26 April 2025 6 (Rescheduled)	Balestier Khalsa (Singapore)	–	(Singapore) Hougang United	Choa Chu Kang
				Stadium: Choa Chu Kang Stadium

4 May 2025 7	Hougang United (Singapore)	–	(Singapore) Tanjong Pagar United	Choa Chu Kang
				Stadium: Choa Chu Kang Stadium

18 May 2025 8	Geylang International (Singapore)	–	(Singapore) Hougang United	Choa Chu Kang
				Stadium: Choa Chu Kang Stadium

League table

Pos	Team	Pld	W	D	L	GF	GA	GD	Pts	Qualification or relegation
1	Albirex Niigata (S) (C)	16	15	0	1	91	6	+85	45	Qualification for AFC Champions League
2	Still Aerion	16	12	2	2	57	21	+36	38	
3	Lion City Sailors	16	11	3	2	76	10	+66	36	
4	Geylang International	16	9	2	5	40	23	+17	29	
5	Hougang United	16	6	2	8	17	28	−11	20	
6	Tanjong Pagar United	16	4	0	12	11	43	−32	12	
7	Tiong Bahru	16	4	0	12	13	47	−34	12	
8	BG Tampines Rovers	16	3	2	11	17	57	−40	11	
9	Balestier Khalsa	16	2	1	13	11	98	−87	7	

Updated to match(es) played on 12 Oct 2025. Source: Women's Premier League
Rules for classification: 1) points; 2) goal difference; 3) number of goals scored; 4) number of wins
(C) League champions
