= 2024–25 Geylang International FC season =

Geylang International
2024–25 season
- Chairman: Thomas Gay
- Head coach: Mohd Noor Ali
- Stadium: Our Tampines Hub, Tampines
- Singapore Premier League: TBD
- Singapore Cup: TBD
- Top goalscorer: League: TBD; All: TBD
Home colours	Away colours

The 2024–25 season was Geylang International's 29th consecutive season in the top flight of Singapore football and in the Singapore Premier League. Along with the Singapore Premier League, the club also competed in the Singapore Cup. The women team will participate in the Women's League.

== Overview ==
=== Transfer ===
Geylang International FC is looking to bounce back from a disappointing 2023 season, where they finished 5th in the Singapore Premier League, a significant drop from their previous year's 4th-place finish.

To address their scoring woes, they've bolstered their attack with proven firepower. Tomoyuki Doi, a former Golden Boot winner, joins the squad alongside Ryoya Tanigushi, Balestier Khalsa's standout player from 2023. The team also secured a loan deal for young winger Sora Tanaka from Matsumoto Yamaga.

Experience is also key for Geylang. Former national player Naqiuddin Eunos and Shakir Hamzah from Tanjong Pagar United add depth and leadership to the team. In goal, Hairul Syirhan returns, replacing the departed Hafiz Ahmad who moves in the opposite direction. They also signed U21 champion Keito Hariya from Albirex Niigata (S).

While they lost Yushi Yamaya (to Akademisk Boldklub) and Amirul Adli (joined Tampines Rovers), Geylang International FC seems to have made significant strides in the transfer market to challenge for a better finish in the upcoming season.

== Squad ==
=== Singapore Premier League ===
No.	Name	Nationality	Date of birth (age)	Previous club	Contract since	Contract end
Goalkeepers
1	Hairul Syirhan	(Singapore)	21 August 1995 (age 31)	(Singapore) Balestier Khalsa	2024	2025
24	Rudy Khairullah	(Singapore)	19 July 1994 (age 32)	(Singapore) Lion City Sailors	2023	2025
Defenders
5	Rio Sakuma	(Japan)	14 April 1997 (age 29)	(Cambodia) Tiffy Army FC (C1)	2022	2025
6	Akmal Azman	(Singapore)	21 November 2000 (age 25)	(Singapore) Balestier Khalsa	2023	2025
13	Faisal Shahril	(Singapore)	7 May 1997 (age 29)	(Canada) Vancouver United (C1)	2023	2025
14	Ahmad Syahir	(Singapore)	10 April 1992 (age 34)	(Singapore) Balestier Khalsa	2022	2025
18	Keito Hariya ^{FP U21}	(Japan)	18 May 2003 (age 23)	(Japan) Albirex Niigata (S)	2024	2025
22	Shakir Hamzah	(Singapore)	20 October 1992 (age 34)	(Singapore) Tanjong Pagar United	2024	2025
Midfielders
4	Takahiro Tezuka	(Japan)	25 June 1998 (age 28)	(Japan) Albirex Niigata (S)	2022	2025
8	Joshua Pereira	(Singapore)	10 October 1997 (age 29)	(Singapore) SAFSA	2020	2025
10	Vincent Bezecourt	(France)	10 June 1993 (age 33)	(Armenia) FC Alashkert (A1)	2022	2025
11	Huzaifah Aziz	(Singapore)	27 June 1994 (age 32)	(Singapore) Tampines Rovers	2022	2025
17	Naqiuddin Eunos	(Singapore)	1 December 1997 (age 28)	(Singapore) Tanjong Pagar United	2024	2025
20	Saifullah Akbar	(Singapore)	31 January 1999 (age 27)	(Singapore) Tampines Rovers	2025	2025
Forwards
7	Naufal Azman	(Singapore)	10 July 1998 (age 28)	(Singapore) Balestier Khalsa	2023	2025
9	Tomoyuki Doi	(Japan)	24 November 1997 (age 28)	(Malta) KF Bylis (M1)	2024	2025
16	Iqbal Hussain	(Singapore)	6 June 1993 (age 33)	(Singapore) Balestier Khalsa	2023	2025
19	Zikos Vasileios Chua	(Singapore) (Greece)	15 April 2002 (age 24)	(Singapore) Young Lions FC	2018	2025
23	Ryoya Tanigushi	(Japan)	31 August 1999 (age 27)	(Singapore) Balestier Khalsa	2024	2025
Players who left during season
15	Sora Tanaka ^{FP U21}	(Japan)	11 November 2004 (age 21)	(Japan) Matsumoto Yamaga FC (J3)	2024	2025
Players on NS / loaned out

Remarks:
^{FP U21} These players are registered as U21 foreign players.

=== Women ===
No.	Name	Nationality	Date of birth (age)	Previous club	Contract since	Contract end
Goalkeepers
1	Nurul Illyanis Khairul	(Singapore)	27 January 2007 (age 19)	(Singapore)	2024	2025
23	Alysha Nasrina	(Singapore)	23 October 2007 (age 19)	(Singapore) BG Tampines Rovers (W)	2024	2025
Defenders
2	Nur Sabrina	(Singapore)		(Singapore) BG Tampines Rovers (W)	2025	2025
3	Natasha Kaur	(Singapore)		(Singapore) Lion City Sailors (W)	2025	2025
4	Siti Fathimah	(Singapore)		(Singapore)	2024	2025
5	Saranya Thiru	(Singapore)		(Singapore) Tiong Bahru FC (W)	2025	2025
6	Na'imi Nur Batrisyia	(Singapore)		(Singapore) Balestier Khalsa (W)	2024	2025
12	Elyssa Qistina	(Singapore)	12 July 2005 (age 21)	(Singapore) ITE College West	2024	2025
13	Olliana Davies	(Australia)	19 November 2009 (age 16)	(Singapore)	2024	2025
15	Hamizah Talib	(Singapore)	2 June 1990 (age 36)	(Singapore)	2024	2025
16	Rabi'atul Ardawiyah	(Singapore)	19 September 2003 (age 23)	(Singapore) BG Tampines Rovers (W)	2025	2025
24	Nur Humairah	(Singapore)		(Singapore)	2025	2025
33	Siti Nurerwadah Erwan	(Singapore)	26 June 2004 (age 22)	(Singapore) Balestier Khalsa (W)	2024	2025
Midfielders
8	Jenna Durell	(Singapore)			2025	2025
11	Charlotte Chong	(Singapore)	3 January 2007 (age 19)	(Singapore) Mattar Sailors (W)	2023	2024
14	Kyra Elise Taylor	(Singapore) (United Kingdom)	19 June 2006 (age 20)	(Scotland) University of St Andrews	2024	2025
17	Wan Nashirah Mohammed	(Singapore)	4 August 2005 (age 21)	(Singapore) Balestier Khalsa (W)	2024	2025
18	Victoria Novoselov	(Russia)		(Singapore)	2025	2025
19	Summer Chong	(Singapore)	18 December 2004 (age 21)	(United States) High Mowing School	2023	2025
Strikers
7	Nadhra Aqilah	(Singapore)	12 April 1994 (age 32)	(Japan) Albirex Niigata (S) (W)	2024	2025
9	Chloe Koh Ke Ying	(Singapore)	18 February 2007 (age 19)	(United States) IMG Academy	2025	2025
10	Farah Nurzahirah	(Singapore)	13 January 2004 (age 22)	(Singapore) Tanjong Pagar United (W)	2024	2025
21	Svea Hertzman	(Sweden) (Singapore)		(Singapore)	2025	2025
22	Farhanah Ruhaizat	(Singapore)	26 July 1998 (age 28)	(Singapore) BG Tampines Rovers (W)	2024	2025
Players left during the season
4	Nurul Asyura	(Singapore)	2008	(Singapore)	2024	2024
20	Nur Insyiarah Intikhab Perwaz	(Singapore)	22 January 2005 (age 21)	(Singapore) Balestier Khalsa (W)	2024	2024
	Azreena Maat	(Singapore)		(Singapore) Balestier Khalsa (W)	2024	2024
	Mastura Jeilani	(Singapore)	10 July 1992 (age 34)	(Singapore) Balestier Khalsa (W)	2024	2024
	Laura Tatiana Zamri	(Singapore)		(Singapore)	2023	2024
	Noridayu Borhan	(Singapore)		(Singapore) Balestier Khalsa (W)	2024	2024
	Victoria Sarka	(United States) (Ecuador)		(Singapore) JSSL Tampines	2024	2024
	Nahwah Aidilreza	(Singapore)	4 May 2007 (age 19)	(Japan) Albirex Niigata (S)	2024	2024
	Maeva Lazorthes Pedauga	(France)		(Singapore)	2024	2024
23	Nur Fatin Rosli	(Singapore)		(Singapore) Police SA	2024	2024
	Nur Alysha	(Singapore)		(Singapore)	2024	2024
19	Nurfathin Ardila	(Singapore)		(Singapore) Balestier Khalsa (W)	2024	2024
	Siti Erma Ellyana	(Singapore)	20 June 1989 (age 37)	(Japan) Albirex Niigata (S)	2024	2024
	Sharifah Amanina	(Singapore)	8 January 2008 (age 18)	Singapore Cricket Club (W)	2024	2024
25	Nur Shaahidah Zulkifli	(Singapore)	31 May 1999 (age 27)	(Japan) Albirex Niigata (S) (W)	2023	2024

== Coaching staff ==
First Team

Position	Name	Ref.
Chairman	(Singapore) Thomas Gay	
Vice-chairman	(China) Shi Kan	
General manager	(Singapore) Berince Wong	
Team Manager	(Singapore) Leonard Koh	
Head coach	(Singapore) Mohd Noor Ali	(Note: 2 years contract till 2024)
Assistant Coach	(Singapore) Hasrin Jailani (Singapore) Vedhamuthu Kanan	
Goalkeeping Coach	(Singapore) Rezal Hassan	
Fitness Coach	(Singapore) Sofiyan Abdul Hamid	
Physiotherapist	(Singapore)	
Sports Trainer	(Singapore) Fazly Hasan	
Kitman	(Singapore) Abdul Latiff	
Sports Scientist		

Youth and Women Team

Position	Name	Ref.
Team Manager (Women)	(Singapore) Nurjannah Jamalludin	
Head Coach (Women)	(Singapore) Ratna Suffian	
Asst. Coach (Women)	(Singapore) Shahul Hameed	
Head of Development & U21 Coach	(Singapore) Azlan Alipah	
U17 Coach	(Singapore) Nor Azli Yusoff (Singapore) Andi Agus	
U15 Coach	(Singapore) Azlan Alipah	
U14 Coach	(Singapore) Azlan Alipah (Singapore) Dawood Anuar	
U13 Coach	(Singapore) Adam Rahman	
Youth Goalkeeping Coach	(Singapore) Yusri Aziz	

== Transfers ==
=== In ===
Pre-season

Position	Player	Transferred From	Team	Ref
GK	(Singapore) Hairul Syirhan	(Singapore) Balestier Khalsa	First Team	Free
GK	(Singapore) Rudy Khairullah	(Singapore) Lion City Sailors	First Team	Free (Note: Rudy Khairullah released by LCS after returning to the team as his contract ended & move back to Geylang permanently.)
GK	(Singapore) Alysha Nasrina	(Singapore) JSSL Tampines	Women	Free
DF	(Singapore) Shakir Hamzah	(Singapore) Tanjong Pagar United	First team	Free
DF	(Singapore) Naqiuddin Eunos	(Singapore) Tanjong Pagar United	First team	Free
DF	(Japan) Keito Hariya	(Japan) Albirex Niigata (S)	First Team	Free
DF	(Singapore) Irfan Rifqi	(Singapore) BG Tampines Rovers U21	U21	Free
DF	(Singapore) Shafrel Ariel	Singapore Sports School	U21	Free
DF	(Singapore) Hud Ismail	Singapore Cricket Club	U21	Free
DF	(Japan) Sho Gamoh	(Singapore) Turf City FC	U21	Free
MF	(Singapore) Irgy Zulkifli	(Singapore) BG Tampines Rovers U17	U21	Free
MF	(Singapore) Danish Adam Abdullah	(Japan) Albirex Niigata (S) U21	U21	Free
MF	(Singapore) Sachin Dev Balamurali	(Japan) Albirex Niigata (S) U17	U17	Free
MF	(Singapore) Siti Erma Ellyana	(Japan) Albirex Niigata (S)	Women	Free
MF	(Singapore) Nur Farhanah Ruhaizat	(Singapore) JSSL Tampines	Women	Free
MF	(Singapore) Mastura Jeilani	(Singapore) Balestier Khalsa (W)	Women	Free
FW	(Japan) Ryoya Tanigushi	(Singapore) Balestier Khalsa	First Team	Free
FW	(Japan) Tomoyuki Doi	N.A.	First team	Free
FW	(Belgium) Nils Vandersmissen	(Singapore) Lion City Sailors U21	U21	Free
FW	(Singapore) Aqil Rifaldy	(Singapore) Lion City Sailors U17	U17	Free
FW	(Singapore) Wan Nashirah Mohammed	(Singapore) Balestier Khalsa (W)	Women	Free
FW	(Singapore) Nur Insyiarah Intikhab Perwaz	(Singapore) Balestier Khalsa (W)	Women	Free

Mid-season

Position	Player	Transferred From	Team	Ref
MF	(Singapore) (England) Kyra Elise Taylor	(United States) IMG Academy	Women	Free
MF	(Singapore) Uday Ghoshal	(Singapore) Tanjong Pagar United U17	U21	Free
MF	(Singapore) (England) Caele Miles	(Japan) Albirex Niigata (S) U15	U15	Free
FW	(Japan) (England) Caius Kai Jun Miles	(Singapore) BG Tampines Rovers FC U17	U17	Free
FW	(Singapore) Aqel Razali	(Singapore) BG Tampines Rovers FC U17	U17	Free
FW	(Singapore) Irfan Haziq	(Singapore) BG Tampines Rovers FC U17	U17	Free
FW	(Singapore) Nabeel Al Lutfi	(Singapore) BG Tampines Rovers FC U15	U15	Free
FW	(Singapore) Aaril Bazli	(Singapore) BG Tampines Rovers FC U13	U13	Free
FW	(Singapore) Nahwah Aidilreza	(Japan) Albirex Niigata (S)	Women	Free
FW	(United States) Victoria Sarka	(Singapore) JSSL Tampines	Women	Free

Postseason

Position	Player	Transferred from	Team	Fee
MF	(Japan) Kaisei Ogawa	(Singapore) Young Lions FC	First Team	Free
FW	(Japan) Shuhei Hoshino	(Japan) Albirex Niigata (S)	First Team	Free
FW	(Japan) Riku Fukashiro	(Singapore) Balestier Khalsa	First Team	Free

=== Loan Return ===
Preseason

Position	Player	Transferred from	Team	Ref
MF	(Singapore) Nur Luqman	(Singapore) SAFSA	First Team	End of NS (Note: Nur Luqman released by club after returning from NS.)
FW	(Singapore) Zikos Vasileios Chua	(Singapore) SAFSA	First Team	End of NS
MF	(Singapore) Furqan Raoff	(Singapore) SAFSA	U21	End of NS (Note: Furqan Raoffn released by club after returning from NS.)

Mid-season

Position	Player	Transferred from	Team	Ref
DF	(Singapore) Ilhan Noor	(Singapore) Police SA	First Team	End of NS
DF	(Singapore) Kieran Teo Jia Jun	(Singapore) SAFSA	U21	End of NS (Note: Kieran released after contract end)

=== Loan In ===
Preseason

Position	Player	Transferred from	Team	Ref
FW	(Japan) Sora Tanaka	(Japan) Matsumoto Yamaga	First Team	Loan till 15 July 2024

Mid-season

Position	Player	Transferred To	Team	Ref
MF	(Singapore) Saifullah Akbar	(Singapore) BG Tampines Rovers	First Team	Season loan till May 2025

=== Out ===
Preseason

Position	Player	Transferred To	Team	Ref
GK	(Singapore) Ridhwan Fikri	(Singapore)	First team	Free
GK	(Singapore) Hafiz Ahmad	(Singapore) Balestier Khalsa	First team	Free
GK	(Singapore) Vernita Erat	(Singapore) Eastern Thunder FC (WNL)	Women	Free
GK	(Colombia) Nathalia Murillo Rengifo	(Singapore)	Women	Free
DF	(Singapore) Amirul Adli	(Singapore) BG Tampines Rovers	First team	Free
DF	(Singapore) Nazhiim Harman	(Singapore) Hougang United	First team	Free
DF	(Singapore) Fadli Kamis	(Singapore)	First team	Free
DF	(Singapore) Ian Faris Shahrin	(Singapore)	U21	Free
DF	(Singapore) Irfan Siregar	(Singapore) Katong FC (SFL1)	U21	Free
DF	(Singapore) Haikal Sukri	(Singapore) Tengah FC (SFL2)	U21	Free
DF	(Singapore) Syafiq Sani	(Singapore)	U21	Free
DF	(Singapore) Izz Anaqi	(Singapore) Young Lions FC	U21	Free
DF	(England) Caius Miles	(Japan) Albirex Niigata (S) U17	U15	Free
DF	(Singapore) Nurul Afiqah Azmi	(Singapore)	Women	Free
DF	(Singapore) Hushwariya	(Singapore)	Women	Free
DF	(Singapore) K.Harini	(Singapore) Royal Arion (WNL)	Women	Free
DF	(Singapore) Shankari Dhoraraj	(Singapore)	Women	Free
DF	(Singapore) Bisesh Gurung	(Singapore)	Women	Free
MF	(Singapore) Gareth Low	(Japan) Albirex Niigata (S)	First team	Free
MF	(Singapore) Noor Ariff	(Singapore)	First team	Free
MF	(Singapore) Nur Luqman	(Singapore) PVOSC (SFL1)	First Team	Free
MF	(Singapore) Azri Suhaili	(Singapore)	U21	Free
MF	(Singapore) Josh Tan Jiunn Fonn	(Singapore)	U21	Free
MF	(Singapore) (Turkey) Ouzkaan Poyraz	(Singapore)	U21	Free
MF	(Singapore) Afiq Iqbal	(Singapore) Hougang United U21	U21	Free
MF	(Singapore) Noridah Abdullah	(Singapore) Eastern Thunder FC (WNL)	Women	Free
MF	(Singapore) Nur Shaahidah Zulkifli	(Singapore)	Women	Free
MF	(Singapore) Siti Nor Aqilah	(Singapore)	Women	Free
MF	(Singapore) Neo Yan Ping	(Singapore) JSSL Tampines	Women	Free
MF	(Singapore) Rauhdah Ramli	(Singapore)	Women	Free
MF	(Singapore) Siti Fardiana Nahar	(Singapore)	Women	Free
MF	(Singapore) Erryn Alyssa	(Singapore)	Women	Free
MF	(Singapore) Fitri Azalea	(Singapore)	Women	Free
MF	(Singapore) Puah Jing Wen	(Singapore) Eastern Thunder FC	Women	Free
FW	(Japan) Yushi Yamaya	(Denmark) Akademisk Boldklub (D3)	First team	Free
FW	(Singapore) Shahfiq Ghani	Singapore Khalsa Association (SFL1)	First team	Free
FW	(Singapore) Danish Haziq	(Singapore) Young Lions FC	U21	Free
FW	(England) (Oman) Zach Whitehouse		U21	Free
FW	(Singapore) Adryan Shah	(Singapore) Tampines Rovers U17	U15	Free

Mid-season

Position	Player	Transferred To	Team	Ref
DF	(Singapore) Ilhan Noor	(Singapore)	First Team	Free
DF	(Singapore) Kieran Teo Jia Jun	(Singapore)	U21	Free
DF	(Australia) Barnaby Davies	(Japan) Blaublitz Akita U19	U21	Free
MF	(Singapore) Nur Insyiarah Intikhab Perwaz	(Singapore) JSSL Tampines	Women	Free
MF	(Singapore) Charlotte Chong	(United States) IMG Academy	Women	Free
MF	(Singapore) (United Kingdom) Kyra Elise Taylor	(Scotland) University of St Andrews	Women	Free
MF	(Singapore) Aaron Lucas Whall	(Singapore)	U15	Free
MF	(Singapore) Putera Irfan	(Spain) Rayo Ciudad Alcobendas Academy	U15	Free
FW	(Singapore) Tariq Shahid Akbar	(Singapore) Balestier Khalsa	U21	Free
FW	(Singapore) Muhammad Afiq Danial	(Singapore) Lion City Sailors DC	U13	Free

=== Loan Return ===
Preseason

Position	Player	Transferred To	Team	Ref
GK	(Singapore) Rudy Khairullah	(Singapore) Lion City Sailors	First Team	End of loan (Note: Rudy Khairullah released by LCS after returning to the team as his contract ended & move back to Geylang permanently.)
DF	(Singapore) Danish Irfan	(Singapore) Tampines Rovers	First Team	End of loan (Note: Danish Irfan released by Tampines Rovers after returning to the team as his contract ended & move to Hougang United permanently.)
MF	(Singapore) Arshad Shamim	(Singapore) Lion City Sailors	First Team	End of loan (Note: Arshad Shamim released by LCS after returning to the team as his contract ended & move to Albirex Niigata permanently.)

Mid-season

Position	Player	Transferred To	Team	Ref
FW	(Japan) Sora Tanaka	(Japan) Matsumoto Yamaga	First Team	End of loan

=== Loan Out ===
Pre-season

Position	Player	Transferred To	Team	Ref
MF	(Singapore) Furqan Raoff	(Singapore) SAFSA	U21	NS till August 2024
DF	(Singapore) Ilhan Noor	(Singapore) Police SA	First Team	NS till January 2025
DF	(Singapore) Kieran Teo Jia Jun	(Singapore) SAFSA	U21	NS till January 2025
MF	(Singapore) Muthukumaran Navaretthinam	(Singapore) SAFSA	U21	NS till June 2025
DF	(Singapore) Syady Sufwan	(Singapore) SAFSA	U21	NS till September 2025
MF	(Singapore) Joel Loh	(Singapore) SAFSA	U17	NS till September 2025
MF	(Singapore) (Greece) Christos Chua	(Singapore) SAFSA	U21	NS till May 2026

Mid-season

Position	Player	Transferred To	Team	Ref
FW	(Singapore) Syazwan Latiff	(Singapore) SAFSA	U21	NS till Oct 2026

=== Retained / Extension / Promoted ===
Position	Player	Ref
DF	(Singapore) Joshua Pereira	1.5 years contract from Jan 2024 till Jun 2025
DF	(Singapore) Ahmad Syahir	1.5 years contract from Jan 2024 till Jun 2025
DF	(Singapore) Akmal Azman	1.5 years contract from Jan 2024 till Jun 2025
DF	(Singapore) Faisal Shahril	1.5 years contract from Jan 2024 till Jun 2025
DF	(Japan) Rio Sakuma	1.5 years contract from Jan 2024 till Jun 2025
MF	(Japan) Takahiro Tezuka	1.5 years contract from Jan 2024 till Jun 2025
MF	(France) Vincent Bezecourt	1.5 years contract from Jan 2024 till Jun 2025
MF	(Singapore) Huzaifah Aziz	1.5 years contract from Jan 2024 till Jun 2025
FW	(Singapore) Naufal Azman	1.5 years contract from Jan 2024 till Jun 2025
FW	(Singapore) Iqbal Hussain	1.5 years contract from Jan 2024 till Jun 2025

== Friendly ==
=== Pre-season ===
Win Draw Loss

2024 SPL Interim Tournament – 23 Feb to 21 Apr 

25 February 2024 1	Geylang International (Singapore)	3–1	(Singapore) Tanjong Pagar United	Tampines
	Zach Whitehouse 45' (pen.); Irfan Rifqi 56'; Nur Ikhsanuddin 72'		Risvi Aaqil 12'	Stadium: Our Tampines Hub

1 March 2024 2	Geylang International (Singapore)	2–5	(Singapore) Young Lions FC	Jalan Bear
	Hud Ismail 63'; Christo Chua 90+3'		Itsuki Enomoto 34', 45', 56'; Farhan Zulkifli 64'; Amir Syafiz 76'	Stadium: Jalan Bear Stadium

8 March 2024 3	Geylang International (Singapore)	0–3	(Singapore) Hougang United	Jalan Bear
			Danish Irfan 43'; Nazrul Nazari 45'; Zamani Zamri 70'	Stadium: Jalan Bear Stadium

13 April 2024 4	Geylang International (Singapore)	0–1	(Singapore) Lion City Sailors	Tampines
			Sergio Carmona 18'	Stadium: Our Tampines Hub

20 April 2024 5	Geylang International (Singapore)	0–3	(Japan) Albirex Niigata (S)	Jalan Besar
			Arya Igami Tarhani 23', 43'; Yohei Otake 66'	Stadium: Jalan Besar Stadium

 Tour of KL – 27 April to 4 May

28 April 2024	Selangor II F.C. (Malaysia)	v	(Singapore) Geylang International	Shah Alam
				Stadium: FA Selangor Training Centre

3 May 2024	Selangor F.C. (Malaysia)	7–0	(Singapore) Geylang International	Petaling Jaya
	Mukhairi Ajmal 12', 39'; Alvin Fortes 36', 60'; Yohandry Orozco 48'; Danial Asri 71'; Harith Haiqal 76'			Stadium: Petaling Jaya Stadium

Others 

23 March 2024	Perak F.C. (Malaysia)	3–0	(Singapore) Geylang International	Ipoh
	Firdaus Saiyadi 6'; Harith Akif 32' (pen.); Adilet Kanybekov 66'			Stadium: Perak Stadium

18 April 2024	Geylang International (Singapore)	0–1	(Malaysia) Pahang FC	Jalan Besar
				Stadium: Jalan Besar Stadium

=== Mid-season ===
12 October 2024	Johor Darul Ta'zim III (Malaysia)	3–3	(Singapore) Geylang International	Johor
				Stadium: Pasir Gudang Corporation Stadium

10 January 2025	Kuala Lumpur Extension (Malaysia)	–	(Singapore) Geylang International	Kuala Lumpur

== Team statistics ==
=== Appearances and goals ===
As of 25 May 2025

No.	Pos.	Player	SPL		Singapore Cup		Total	
No.	Pos.	Player	Apps.	Goals	Apps.	Goals	Apps.	Goals
1	GK	(Singapore) Hairul Syirhan	12+1	0	2	0	15	0
4	MF	(Japan) Takahiro Tezuka	31	2	4	0	35	2
5	DF	(Japan) Rio Sakuma	26	3	3	0	29	3
6	DF	(Singapore) Akmal Azman	14+12	0	4	0	30	0
7	MF	(Singapore) Naufal Azman	3+11	1	0+3	0	17	1
8	DF	(Singapore) Joshua Pereira	27+1	1	1	0	29	1
9	FW	(Japan) Tomoyuki Doi	30+1	44	4	6	35	50
10	MF	(France) Vincent Bezecourt	29	10	2	0	31	10
11	MF	(Singapore) Huzaifah Aziz	12	0	2+2	0	16	0
13	DF	(Singapore) Faisal Shahrin	1+5	0	0	0	6	0
14	DF	(Singapore) Ahmad Syahir	2+17	0	0+1	0	20	0
16	FW	(Singapore) Iqbal Hussain	15+11	2	3+1	0	30	2
17	DF	(Singapore) Naqiuddin Eunos	28+2	6	3	0	33	6
18	MF	(Japan) Keito Hariya	31	1	4	1	35	2
19	FW	(Singapore) (Greece) Zikos Chua	2+19	4	0+1	0	22	4
20	MF	(Singapore) Saifullah Akbar	6+5	0	3+1	0	15	0
22	DF	(Singapore) Shakir Hamzah	27	5	2	0	29	5
23	FW	(Japan) Ryoya Taniguchi	31	14	4	0	35	14
24	GK	(Singapore) Rudy Khairullah	19	0	2	0	21	0
54	FW	(Australia) Jake Ellenberger	0+1	0	0+1	0	2	0
55	DF	(Singapore) Syafi Suhaimi	0+1	0	0	0	1	0
56	DF	(Singapore) Raiyan Noor	1+6	0	0	0	7	0
57	DF	(Singapore) Hud Ismail	0+5	0	1	0	6	0
61	DF	(Singapore) Prince Rio Rifae'i	1+3	0	0+2	0	6	0
66	MF	(Singapore) Nur Ikhsanuddin	0+4	0	0	0	4	0
73	DF	(Singapore) Kyan Neo	0+1	0	0	0	1	0
Players who have played this season but had left the club or on loan to other club
15	FW	(Japan) Sora Tanaka	2+1	1	0	0	3	1
58	DF	(Singapore) Shafrel Ariel	0+1	0	0	0	1	0
75	FW	(Singapore) Tariq Shahid Akbar	0+1	0	0	0	1	0

== Competitions (Men) ==
=== Overview ===
Results summary (SPL)

Overall								Home						Away					
Pld	W	D	L	GF	GA	GD	Pts	W	D	L	GF	GA	GD	W	D	L	GF	GA	GD
0	0	0	0	0	0	0	0	0	0	0	0	0	0	0	0	0	0	0	0

=== Singapore Premier League ===
Win Draw Loss

10 May 2024 1	Balestier Khalsa (Singapore)	2–2	(Singapore) Geylang International	Bishan
	Kodai Tanaka 57' 81' (pen.); Jordan Emaviwe (yellow card) 18'; Ismail Sassi (yellow card) 33'; Masahiro Sugita (yellow card) 74'		Shakir Hamzah 6' (yellow card) 58'; Tomoyuki Doi 38'; Huzaifah Aziz (yellow card) 15'; Vincent Bezecourt (yellow card) 42'	Stadium: Bishan Stadium; Referee: Farhan Mohd; Man of the Match: (Singapore) Hairul Syirhan

17 May 2024 2	Geylang International (Singapore)	4–4	(Singapore) BG Tampines Rovers	Jalan Besar
	Amirul Adli 21' (o.g.); Tomoyuki Doi 34'; Naqiuddin Eunos 61'; Ryoya Tanigushi 75'; Joshua Pereira (yellow card) 52'		Boris Kopitović 6' (pen.); Miloš Zlatković 11'; Taufik Suparno 83', 84'; Amirul Adli (yellow card) 44'; Shuya Yamashita (yellow card) 69'	Stadium: Jalan Besar Stadium; Referee: Andrea Verolino; Man of the Match: (Singapore) Taufik Suparno

25 May 2024 3	Geylang International (Singapore)	7–1	(Singapore) Young Lions FC	Jalan Besar
	Ryoya Tanigushi 13'; Sora Tanaka 18' (yellow card) 71'; Tomoyuki Doi 54', 66', 89'; Vincent Bezecourt 79'; Takahiro Tezuka 82'; Hairul Syirhan (yellow card) 57'		Itsuki Enomoto 59' (pen.); Fathullah Rahmat (yellow card) 53'; Khairin Nadim (yellow card) 80'	Stadium: Jalan Besar Stadium; Referee: Jansen Foo; Man of the Match: (Japan) Tomoyuki Doi

14 June 2024 4	Hougang United (Singapore)	2–6	(Singapore) Geylang International	Jalan Besar
	Dejan Račić 65'; Stjepan Plazonja 71'; Ajay Robson (yellow card) 15'; Ensar Brunčević (yellow card) 47'		Tomoyuki Doi 13', 61', 87'; Faris Hasic 39' (o.g.); Zikos Chua 83', 85'; Akmal Azman (yellow card) 18'	Stadium: Jalan Besar Stadium; Referee: Zulfiqar Bin Mustaffa; Man of the Match: (Japan) Tomoyuki Doi

22 June 2024 5	DPMM FC (Brunei)	3–3	(Singapore) Geylang International	Bandar Seri Begawan
	Azwan Ali Rahman 26' (yellow card) 28'; Hakeme Yazid Said 76' (pen.); Julio Cruz 81'; Farshad Noor (yellow card) 37' (yellow-red card) 63'; Gabriel Gama (yellow card) 70'; Miguel Oliveira (yellow card) 89'; Nurikhwan Othman (yellow card) 90'; Kristijan Naumovski (yellow card) 90+4'		Naqiuddin Eunos 15'; Rio Sakuma 22'; Tomoyuki Doi 30'; Shakir Hamzah (yellow card) 18'; Rio Sakuma (yellow card) 76'	Stadium: Hassanal Bolkiah National Stadium; Referee: Farhan Mohd

28 June 2024 6	Geylang International (Singapore)	1–1	(Singapore) Lion City Sailors	Jalan Besar
	Vincent Bezecourt 13'; Joshua Pereira (yellow card) 45'; Hairul Syirhan (yellow card) 90+2'; Ahmad Syahir (yellow card) 90+4'		Maxime Lestienne 58'; Hami Syahin (yellow card) 3'; Toni Datković (yellow card) 34'; Bailey Wright (yellow card) 80'	Stadium: Jalan Besar Stadium; Attendance: 1,085; Referee: Taufik Thana; Man of the Match: (France) Vincent Bezecourt

6 July 2024 7	Albirex Niigata (S) (Japan)	0–6	(Singapore) Geylang International	Jurong East
	Yohei Otake (yellow card) 51'		Shakir Hamzah 20'; Iqbal Hussain 50'; Tomoyuki Doi 78', 84', 88' (pen.); Naqiuddin Eunos 82'; Vincent Bezecourt (yellow card) 35'	Stadium: Jurong East Stadium; Referee: Muhammad Taqi; Man of the Match: (Japan) Tomoyuki Doi

19 July 2024 8	Geylang International (Singapore)	5–3	(Singapore) Tanjong Pagar United	Jalan Besar
	Tomoyuki Doi 25', 72' (yellow card) 65'; Ryoya Tanigushi 65'; Shakir Hamzah (yellow card) 45+2'; Naqiuddin Eunos 88'; Naufal Azman 90+6'		Salif Cissé 20'; Faizal Roslan 40'; Sahil Suhaimi 45+1'	Stadium: Jalan Besar Stadium; Referee: Clarence Leow; Man of the Match: (Japan) Tomoyuki Doi

24 July 2024 9	BG Tampines Rovers (Singapore)	2–2	(Singapore) Geylang International	Jalan Besar
	Glenn Kweh 26'; Seia Kunori 75'; Miloš Zlatković (yellow card) 57'; Irfan Najeeb (yellow card) 69'; Taufik Suparno (yellow card) 90+3'		Ryoya Tanigushi 55'; Rio Sakuma 90+4'; Shakir Hamzah (yellow card) 21'; Naqiuddin Eunos (yellow card) 67'	Stadium: Jalan Besar Stadium; Referee: Jansen Foo; Man of the Match: (Japan) Rio Sakuma

28 July 2024 10	Geylang International (Singapore)	4–4	(Singapore) Balestier Khalsa	Jalan Besar
	Tomoyuki Doi 4', 29' (pen.); Vincent Bezecourt 20', 78'; Takahiro Tezuka (yellow card) 37'; Naqiuddin Eunos (yellow card) 62'		Kodai Tanaka 60', 71' (pen.); Ismail Sassi 67' (yellow card) 24'; Ignatius Ang 80'; Alen Kozar (yellow card) 45+1'; Tajeli Salamat (red card) 53'; Amer Hakeem (yellow card) 88'	Stadium: Jalan Besar Stadium; Referee: Taufik Thana; Man of the Match: (Japan) Kodai Tanaka

2 August 2024 11	Geylang International (Singapore)	0–1	(Singapore) Hougang United	Jalan Besar
			Dejan Račić 36'; Ensar Brunčević (yellow card) 69' Petar Banović (yellow card) 89'	Stadium: Jalan Besar Stadium; Referee: Oswind Suriya; Man of the Match: (Montenegro) Dejan Račić

10 August 2024 12	Young Lions FC (Singapore)	0–3	(Singapore) Geylang International	Jalan Besar
			Tomoyuki Doi 12', 71'; Vincent Bezecourt 77'	Stadium: Jalan Besar Stadium; Referee: Ahmad A'Qashah; Man of the Match: (Japan) Tomoyuki Doi

24 August 2024 13	Geylang International (Singapore)	2–4	(Brunei) DPMM FC	Jalan Besar
	Tomoyuki Doi 64', 66'; Joshua Pereira (yellow card) 45+4'; Ryoya Tanigushi (yellow card) 84'		Miguel Oliveira 5'; Julio Cruz 32' (yellow card) 45+4'; Hakeme Yazid Said 38', 62'; Abdul Hariz Herman (yellow card) 6'	Stadium: Jalan Besar Stadium; Referee: Zulfiqar Bin Mustaffa; Man of the Match: (Brunei) Hakeme Yazid Said

30 August 2024 14	Lion City Sailors (Singapore)	2–2	(Singapore) Geylang International	Bishan
	Bart Ramselaar 49'; Maxime Lestienne 65'; Song Ui-young (yellow card) 32'; Hami Syahin (yellow card) 61'; Lennart Thy (yellow card) 82'		Tomoyuki Doi 49', 85' (pen.); Shakir Hamzah (yellow card) 40'; Rio Sakuma (yellow card) 88'	Stadium: Bishan Stadium; Referee: Clarence Leow; Man of the Match: (Belgium) Maxime Lestienne

15 September 2024 15	Geylang International (Singapore)	5–1	(Japan) Albirex Niigata (S)	Jalan Besar
	Tomoyuki Doi 13', 22', 73'; Ryoya Tanigushi 55' (yellow card) 67'; Zikos Chua 84'; Shakir Hamzah (yellow card) 11'		Haziq Kamarudin 76'; Syed Firdaus Hassan (yellow card) 45+1'; Arshad Shamim (yellow card) 86'	Stadium: Jalan Besar Stadium; Referee: Jansen Foo; Man of the Match: (Japan) Tomoyuki Doi

28 September 2024 16	Tanjong Pagar United (Singapore)	2–7	(Singapore) Geylang International	Jurong East
	Tomoki Wada 19'; Akram Azman 41'; Stefan Paunovic (yellow card) 45+4'		Tomoyuki Doi 18' (pen.), 74', 79'; Ryoya Tanigushi 23'; Naqiuddin Eunos 33'; Shakir Hamzah 44'; Vincent Bezecourt 63'	Stadium: Jurong East Stadium; Referee: Zulfiqar Mustaffa; Man of the Match: (Japan) Tomoyuki Doi

20 October 2024 17	Balestier Khalsa (Singapore)	1–4	(Singapore) Geylang International	Bishan
	Elijah Lim Teck Yong 74'; Hafiz Ahmad (yellow card) 90+1'		Takahiro Tezuka 14'; Ryoya TaniguChi 52'; Tomoyuki Doi 58'; Zikos Chua 66'; Rio Sakuma (yellow card) 56'; Vincent Bezecourt (yellow card) 81'	Stadium: Bishan Stadium; Referee: Zulfiqar Mustaffa; Man of the Match: (Japan) Ryoya Taniguchi

29 October 2024 18 (Rescheduled)	Geylang International (Singapore)	0–3	(Singapore) BG Tampines Rovers	Jalan Besar
			Kyoga Nakamura 34' (yellow card) 31'; Miloš Zlatković 64'; Taufik Suparno 82'; Glenn Kweh (yellow card) 54'; Shuya Yamashita (yellow card) 67'	Stadium: Jalan Besar Stadium; Referee: Hilmi Fuad; Man of the Match: (Japan) Kyoga Nakamura

3 November 2024 19	Geylang International (Singapore)	4–0	(Singapore) Young Lions FC	Jalan Besar
	Shakir Hamzah 34'; Tomoyuki Doi 50', 73', 88'; Akmal Azman (yellow card) 37'			Stadium: Jalan Besar Stadium; Referee: Oswind Suriya; Man of the Match: (Japan) Tomoyuki Doi

24 November 2024 20 (Rescheduled)	Hougang United (Singapore)	2–3	(Singapore) Geylang International	Jalan Besar
	Dejan Račić 18'; Shodai Yokoyama 31'; Danish Irfan (yellow card) 43'; Zulfahmi Arifin (yellow card) 45+2'; Nazhiim Harman (yellow card) 71'		Tomoyuki Doi 45'; Ryoya Taniguchi 53'; Joshua Pereira 65'; Vincent Bezecourt (yellow card) 35'; Shakir Hamzah (yellow card) 69'	Stadium: Jalan Besar Stadium; Referee: Jansen Foo; Man of the Match: (Singapore) Joshua Pereira

18 January 2025 21	DPMM FC (Brunei)	0–2	(Singapore) Geylang International	Bandar Seri Begawan
	Nazirrudin Ismail (yellow card) 65'; Nazry Aiman Azaman (yellow card) 81'		Tomoyuki Doi 39' (yellow card) 85'; Ryoya Taniguchi 78'; Akmal Azman (yellow card) 73'; Rudy Khairullah (yellow card) 84'	Stadium: Hassanal Bolkiah National Stadium; Referee: Ahmad A'Qashah; Man of the Match: (Japan) Tomoyuki Doi

26 January 2025 22	Geylang International (Singapore)	1–2	(Singapore) Lion City Sailors	Jalan Besar
	Vincent Bezecourt 13'; Naqiuddin Eunos (yellow card) 38'; Joshua Pereira (yellow card) 72'		Toni Datković 29'; Shawal Anuar 56' (yellow card) 90+3'; Diogo Costa (yellow card) 38'; Hami Syahin (yellow card) 62'; Izwan Mahbud (yellow card) 90+5'	Stadium: Jalan Besar Stadium; Referee: Muhammad Taqi; Man of the Match: (Singapore) Shawal Anuar

9 February 2025 23	Albirex Niigata (S) (Japan)	1–1	(Singapore) Geylang International	Jurong East
	Ryhan Stewart 90+5'; Shingo Nakano (penalty missed) 7 (yellow card) 90+1'; Stevia Egbus Mikuni (yellow card) 42' (yellow-red card) 65'; Syed Firdaus Hassan (yellow card) 59'; Arshad Shamim (yellow card) 69'; Yohei Otake (yellow card) 71'		Tomoyuki Doi 23'; Keito Hariya (yellow card) 6'; Shakir Hamzah (yellow card) 60'; Akmal Azman (yellow card) 82'	Stadium: Jurong East Stadium; Referee: Jansen Foo; Man of the Match: (Singapore) Ryhan Stewart

27 February 2025 24	Geylang International (Singapore)	5–0	(Singapore) Tanjong Pagar United	Jalan Besar
	Ryoya Taniguchi 3'; Vincent Bezecourt 7'; Tomoyuki Doi 53', 78' (pen.), 90'		Faizal Roslan (yellow card) 16'; Hariysh Krishnakumar (yellow card) 54'	Stadium: Jalan Besar Stadium; Referee: Muhammad Taqi; Man of the Match: (Japan) Ryoya Taniguchi

7 March 2025 25	Geylang International (Singapore)	3–4	(Singapore) Balestier Khalsa	Jalan Besar
	Vincent Bezecourt 45+1'; Tomoyuki Doi 78'; Madhu Mohana 85' (o.g.); Takahiro Tezuka (yellow card) 59'		Kodai Tanaka 25'; Keito Hariya 60' (o.g.); Harith Kanadi 68'; Ignatius Ang 90+8'; Elijah Lim Teck Yong (yellow card) 90+10'	Stadium: Jalan Besar Stadium; Referee: Oswind Suriya; Man of the Match: (Japan) Kodai Tanaka

4 April 2025 26	BG Tampines Rovers (Singapore)	3–1	(Singapore) Geylang International	Jalan Besar
	Miloš Zlatković 3' (yellow card) 23'; Itsuki Enomoto 19'; Seia Kunori 41'		Shakir Hamzah 34'; Rio Sakuma (yellow card) 22'; Syafi Suhaimi (yellow card) 86'	Stadium: Jalan Besar Stadium; Referee: Farhan Mohd; Man of the Match: (Japan) Itsuki Enomoto

11 April 2025 27	Geylang International (Singapore)	4–3	(Singapore) Hougang United	Jalan Besar
	Naqiuddin Eunos 11'; Tomoyuki Doi 24', 81', 90+3'; Joshua Pereira (yellow card) 33'; Saifullah Akbar (yellow card) 45+1'		Dejan Račić 35' (pen.); Farhan Zulkifli 77'; Daniel Alemão 90+2'	Stadium: Jalan Besar Stadium; Referee: Zulfiqar Mustaffa; Man of the Match: (Japan) Tomoyuki Doi

15 May 2025 28 (Rescheduled)	Young Lions FC (Singapore)	1–2	(Singapore) Geylang International	Jalan Besar
	Kan Kobayashi 45+1'; Bill Mamadou (yellow card) 90+1'		Rio Sakuma 65' (yellow card) 81'; Ryoya Taniguchi 90'	Stadium: Jalan Besar Stadium; Referee: Clarence Leow; Man of the Match: (Japan) Ryoya Taniguchi

29 April 2025 29 (Rescheduled)	Geylang International (Singapore)	1–3	(Brunei) DPMM FC	Tampines
	Vincent Bezecourt 85'; Saifullah Akbar (yellow card) 16'; Huzaifah Aziz (yellow card) 41'; Ahmad Syahir (yellow card) 83'		Dāvis Ikaunieks 34', 77'; Nurikhwan Othman 69'; Farshad Noor (yellow card) 23'; Yura Indera Putera Yunos (yellow card) 67'; Gabriel Gama (yellow card) 90+6'	Stadium: Our Tampines Hub (Note: Match rescheduled and location changed to Our Tampines Hub due to General Election 2025 and potential closures of selected ActiveSG facilities, including stadiums that are typically used for SPL fixtures); Referee: Jansen Foo; Man of the Match: (Latvia) Dāvis Ikaunieks

4 May 2025 30 (Rescheduled)	Lion City Sailors (Singapore)	2–3	(Singapore) Geylang International	Tampines
	Lennart Thy 36'; Shawal Anuar 38'; Hami Syahin (yellow card) 47'; Rui Pires (yellow card) 70'		Tomoyuki Doi 44', 85'; Ryoya Taniguchi 71'; Naqiuddin Eunos (yellow card) 76'; Vincent Bezecourt (yellow card) 77'; Shakir Hamzah (yellow card) 80'; Iqbal Hussain (yellow card) 90+6'	Stadium: Our Tampines Hub (Note: Match rescheduled and location changed to Our Tampines Hub due to General Election 2025 and potential closures of selected ActiveSG facilities, including stadiums that are typically used for SPL fixtures); Referee: Andrea Verolino; Man of the Match: (Japan) Tomoyuki Doi

11 May 2025 31	Geylang International (Singapore)	1–4	(Japan) Albirex Niigata (S)	Tampines
	Iqbal Hussain 48'; Keito Hariya (red card) 74'		Shingo Nakano 15', 81'; Yohei Otake 75'; Amy Recha 85'	Stadium: Our Tampines Hub (Note: Location changed to Our Tampines Hub due to JBS stadium not available.); Referee: Farhan Mohd; Man of the Match: (Japan) Shingo Nakano

25 May 2025 32	Tanjong Pagar United (Singapore)	3–3	(Singapore) Geylang International	Jurong East
	Salif Cissé 29', 49'; Rezza Rezky 55'; Raihan Rahman (yellow card) 45+3'; Faizal Roslan (yellow card) 90'		Ryoya Taniguchi 35', 65' (yellow card) 71'; Keito Hariya 75'; Hud Ismail (yellow card) 70'; Faisal Shahrin (yellow card) 83'	Stadium: Jurong East Stadium; Referee: Farhan Mohd; Man of the Match: (Singapore) Prathip Ekamparam

Pos	Team	Pld	W	D	L	GF	GA	GD	Pts	Qualification or relegation
1	Lion City Sailors (C)	32	22	6	4	96	32	+64	72	Qualification for Champions League Two group stage & ASEAN Club Championship (Note: Since the winners of the 2024–25 Singapore Cup, Lion City Sailors, had already qualified for the AFC Champions League Two and ASEAN Club Championship, the spot given to the Singapore Cup winners (Champions League Two) was passed to the second-placed team.)
2	BG Tampines Rovers	32	19	7	6	84	37	+47	64	Qualification for Champions League Two group stage & ASEAN Club Championship
3	Geylang International	32	15	9	8	97	64	+33	54	
4	Balestier Khalsa	32	14	6	12	84	80	+4	48	
5	DPMM (Note: Ineligible for AFC competition spots)	32	12	8	12	54	61	−7	44	Transferred to the 2025–26 Malaysia Super League post-season
6	Albirex Niigata (S)	32	13	3	16	55	71	−16	42	
7	Hougang United	32	7	10	15	61	76	−15	31	
8	Young Lions	32	7	8	17	47	89	−42	29	
9	Tanjong Pagar United	32	3	7	22	35	103	−68	16	

Updated to match(es) played on 25 May 2025. Source: Singapore Premier League
Rules for classification: 1) points; 2) goal difference; 3) number of goals scored; 4) number of wins
(C) Champions

=== Singapore Cup ===
Pos	Team	Pld	W	D	L	GF	GA	GD	Pts	Qualification
1	Lion City Sailors	4	3	1	0	12	4	+8	10	Semi-finals
2	BG Pathum United	4	2	2	0	7	5	+2	8	Semi-finals
3	Balestier Khalsa	4	2	0	2	10	10	0	6	
4	Tanjong Pagar United	4	1	0	3	3	9	−6	3	
5	Geylang International	4	0	1	3	7	11	−4	1	

Source: FAS

2 February 2025 Group Match 1	Geylang International (Singapore)	4–5	(Singapore) Balestier Khalsa	Jalan Besar
	Tomoyuki Doi 5', 44', 81'; Keito Hariya 15'; Hud Ismail (yellow card) 32'		Anton Fase 3'; Kodai Tanaka 26', 50', 58'; Ignatius Ang 60'; Masahiro Sugita (yellow card) 34'; Darren Teh (yellow card) 38'; Harith Kanadi (yellow card) 42'; Abdil Qaiyyim Mutalib (yellow card) 66'	Stadium: Jalan Besar Stadium; Referee: Ahmad A'Qashah

16 February 2025 Group Match 2	BG Pathum United (Thailand)	2–2	(Singapore) Geylang International	Jalan Besar
	Naqiuddin Eunos 35' (o.g.); Airfan Doloh 38'; Marco Ballini (yellow card) 45+4'; Ikhsan Fandi (penalty missed) 85; Kanokpon Buspakom (yellow card) 90+8'	Report	Tomoyuki Doi 5', 7' (penalty missed) 45+4 (yellow card) 74'; Huzaifah Aziz (yellow card) 14'	Stadium: Jalan Besar Stadium; Referee: Farhan Mohd

27 March 2025 Group Match 3 (Rescheduled)	Geylang International (Singapore)	1–3	(Singapore) Lion City Sailors	Jalan Besar
	Tomoyuki Doi 55' (pen.); Shakir Hamzah (yellow card) 26'		Lennart Thy 3', 67', 75'; Anumanthan Kumar (yellow card) 30'; Song Ui-young (yellow card) 39'	Stadium: Jalan Besar Stadium; Referee: Clarence Leow

15 March 2025 Group Match 4	Tanjong Pagar United (Singapore)	1–0	(Singapore) Geylang International	Jurong East
	Faizal Roslan 83' (pen.); Zenivio (yellow card) 25'; Rezza Rezky (yellow card) 26'		Rio Sakuma (yellow card) 35'; Naufal Azman (yellow card) 87'	Stadium: Jurong East Stadium; Referee: Farhan Mohd

== Competition (Women) ==
=== 2024 Women's Premier League ===
Win Draw Loss

10 March 2024 1	Geylang International (Singapore)	0–3	(Japan) Albirex Niigata (S)	Choa Chu Kang
			Mulan Ayliffe 5', 90+3'; Manami Fukuzawa 38'	Stadium: Choa Chu Kang Stadium

16 March 2024 2	Geylang International (Singapore)	0–2	(Singapore) Hougang United	Choa Chu Kang
			Raudhah Kamis 11'; Riddle Reneelyn Sison 39'	Stadium: Choa Chu Kang Stadium

13 April 2024 3	Geylang International (Singapore)	2–0	(Singapore) Tanjong Pagar United	Simei
	Farah Nurzahirah 1'; Pan Shi Yu 83' (o.g.)	Report		Stadium: ITE College East

28 April 2024 4	Geylang International (Singapore)	5–0	(Singapore) Balestier Khalsa	Simei
	Azreena Maat 14', 30'; Wan Nasriah 21'; Farah Nurzahirah 77'; Laura Tatiana Zamri 89'	Report		Stadium: ITE College East

5 May 2024 5 (Rescheduled)	Geylang International (Singapore)	1–1	(Singapore) Still Aerion WFC	Simei
	Farah Nurzahirah 35'	Report	Uraiporn Yongkul 45+1'	Stadium: ITE College East

12 May 2024 6	Geylang International (Singapore)	2–1	(Singapore) JSSL Tampines	Simei
	Maeva Lazorthes Pedauga; Farah Nurzahirah			Stadium: ITE College East

18 May 2024 7	Geylang International (Singapore)	4–0	(Singapore) Tiong Bahru	Choa Chu Kang
	Farah Nurzahirah; Reyna; Farhanah Ruhaizat			Stadium: Choa Chu Kang Stadium

23 June 2024 8	Geylang International (Singapore)	2–1	(Singapore) Lion City Sailors	Simei
	Victoria Sarka 70' 72'		Madison Josephine Telmer 86'	Stadium: ITE College East

30 June 2024 9	Geylang International (Singapore)	0–3	(Japan) Albirex Niigata (S)	Choa Chu Kang
				Stadium: Choa Chu Kang Stadium

20 July 2024 10	Geylang International (Singapore)	3–3	(Singapore) Hougang United	Choa Chu Kang
	Farhanah Ruhaizat; Summer Chong; Victoria Sarka			Stadium: Choa Chu Kang Stadium

27 July 2024 11	Geylang International (Singapore)	3–0	(Singapore) Tanjong Pagar United	Choa Chu Kang
	Farhanah Ruhaizat; Victoria Sarka			Stadium: Choa Chu Kang Stadium

11 August 2024 12	Geylang International (Singapore)	13–0	(Singapore) Balestier Khalsa	Simei
	Siti Nurerwadah Erwan; Wan Nashirah Mohammed; Nahwah Aidilreza; Farhanah Ruhaizat; Summer Chong; Olliana Davies; Farah Nurzahirah			Stadium: ITE College East

17 August 2024 13	Geylang International (Singapore)	1–1	(Singapore) Still Aerion WFC	Choa Chu Kang
	Kyla Taylor			Stadium: Choa Chu Kang Stadium

25 August 2024 14	Geylang International (Singapore)	5–1	(Singapore) JSSL Tampines	Jalan Besar
	Farah Nurzahirah; Siti Nurerwadah Erwan; Farhanah Ruhaizat; Shaahidah Zulkifli; Nahwah Aidilreza			Stadium: Jalan Besar Stadium

31 August 2024 15	Geylang International (Singapore)	7–0	(Singapore) Tiong Bahru	Choa Chu Kang
	Farah Nurzahirah; Noridayu Borhan; Hamizah Talib; Siti Nurerwadah Erwan; Farhanah Ruhaizat			Stadium: Choa Chu Kang Stadium

8 September 2024 16	Geylang International (Singapore)	0–0	(Singapore) Lion City Sailors	Simei
				Stadium: ITE College East

League table

Pos	Team	Pld	W	D	L	GF	GA	GD	Pts	Qualification or relegation
1	Lion City Sailors (C)	16	14	1	1	95	4	+91	43	Qualification for AFC Champions League
2	Albirex Niigata (S)	16	14	0	2	84	9	+75	42	
3	Geylang International	16	9	4	3	48	16	+32	31	
4	Still Aerion	16	8	4	4	38	27	+11	28	
5	Hougang United	16	8	3	5	37	22	+15	27	
6	Tanjong Pagar United	16	5	2	9	15	25	−10	17	
7	BG Tampines Rovers	16	3	2	11	22	59	−37	11	
8	Tiong Bahru	16	2	1	13	11	81	−70	7	
9	Balestier Khalsa	16	0	1	15	3	110	−107	1	

Updated to match(es) played on 15 September 2024. Source: Women's Premier League
Rules for classification: 1) points; 2) goal difference; 3) number of goals scored; 4) number of wins
(C) League champions

=== 2025 Women's Premier League ===
Win Draw Loss

9 March 2025 1	Hougang United (Singapore)	1–1	(Singapore) Geylang International	Choa Chu Kang
	Sydney Hector 74'		Farah Nurzahirah 17'	Stadium: Choa Chu Kang Stadium

23 March 2025 2	Geylang International (Singapore)	1–3	(Singapore) Albirex Niigata (S)	Choa Chu Kang
	Farah Nurzahirah 26'		Manami Fukuzawa 24'; Vanessa Han 31'; Nurzaherra Maisarah 53'	Stadium: Choa Chu Kang Stadium

13 April 2025 3	Geylang International (Singapore)	1–4	(Singapore) Still Aerion WFC	Choa Chu Kang
	Farah Nurzahirah 52' (pen.)		Puteri Alisa Wilkinson 11'; Sunisa Srangthaisong 24'; Noralinda 60'; Nurul Unaisah 90'	Stadium: Choa Chu Kang Stadium

16 April 2025 4	Balestier Khalsa (Singapore)	8–1	(Singapore) Geylang International	Choa Chu Kang
	Farah Nurzahirah 2' 11' 18' 25' 31'; Victoria Novoselov 45'; Hamizah Talib 56' (pen.); Farhanah Ruhaizat 61'		Sharifah Amanina 90+5'	Stadium: Choa Chu Kang Stadium

26 April 2025 5 (Rescheduled)	Geylang International (Singapore)	P–P	(Singapore) BG Tampines Rovers	Choa Chu Kang
				Stadium: Choa Chu Kang Stadium

Match is postponed due to the unavailability of the stadium as a result of the 2025 General Election

3 May 2025 6 (Rescheduled)	Tiong Bahru FC (Singapore)	P–P	(Singapore) Geylang International	Choa Chu Kang
				Stadium: Choa Chu Kang Stadium

Match is postponed due to the unavailability of the stadium as a result of the 2025 General Election

10 May 2025 7	Lion City Sailors (Singapore)	8–0	(Singapore) Geylang International	Choa Chu Kang
	Nurhidayu Naszri 16'; Raeka Ee Pei Ying 20', 43', 53', 81'; Priscille Le Helloco 32'; Sarah Zu’risqha Zul’kepli 47', 56'			Stadium: Choa Chu Kang Stadium

18 May 2025 8	Geylang International (Singapore)	6–0	(Singapore) Hougang United	Choa Chu Kang
	Farhanah Ruhaizat 7'; Farah Nurzahirah 22' 45' 49'; Kyra Taylor 34'; Svea Nadia Hertzman 90'			Stadium: Choa Chu Kang Stadium

25 May 2025 9	Albirex Niigata (S) (Singapore)	1–0	(Singapore) Geylang International	Choa Chu Kang
	Kana Kitahara			Stadium: Choa Chu Kang Stadium

17 August 2025 10	Geylang International (Singapore)	–	(Singapore) Balestier Khalsa	Choa Chu Kang
				Stadium: Choa Chu Kang Stadium

23 August 2025 11	Geylang International (Singapore)	–	(Singapore) Tanjong Pagar United	Choa Chu Kang
				Stadium: Choa Chu Kang Stadium

30 August 2025 12	Tanjong Pagar United (Singapore)	–	(Singapore) Geylang International	Choa Chu Kang
				Stadium: Choa Chu Kang Stadium

7 September 2025 13	Still Aerion (Singapore)	v	(Singapore) Geylang International	Choa Chu Kang
				Stadium: Choa Chu Kang Stadium

20 September 2025 14	BG Tampines Rovers (Singapore)	v	(Singapore) Geylang International	Choa Chu Kang
				Stadium: Choa Chu Kang Stadium

27 September 2025 15	Geylang International (Singapore)	–	(Singapore) Tiong Bahru FC	Choa Chu Kang
				Stadium: Choa Chu Kang Stadium

4 October 2025 16	Geylang International (Singapore)	–	(Singapore) Lion City Sailors	Choa Chu Kang
				Stadium: Choa Chu Kang Stadium

League table

Pos	Team	Pld	W	D	L	GF	GA	GD	Pts	Qualification or relegation
1	Albirex Niigata (S) (C)	16	15	0	1	91	6	+85	45	Qualification for AFC Champions League
2	Still Aerion	16	12	2	2	57	21	+36	38	
3	Lion City Sailors	16	11	3	2	76	10	+66	36	
4	Geylang International	16	9	2	5	40	23	+17	29	
5	Hougang United	16	6	2	8	17	28	−11	20	
6	Tanjong Pagar United	16	4	0	12	11	43	−32	12	
7	Tiong Bahru	16	4	0	12	13	47	−34	12	
8	BG Tampines Rovers	16	3	2	11	17	57	−40	11	
9	Balestier Khalsa	16	2	1	13	11	98	−87	7	

Updated to match(es) played on 12 Oct 2025. Source: Women's Premier League
Rules for classification: 1) points; 2) goal difference; 3) number of goals scored; 4) number of wins
(C) League champions
