= Faris Hasić =

Serbian footballer

Personal information
- Date of birth: 13 June 2003 (age 23)
- Place of birth: Bosnia
- Height: 1.86 m (6 ft 1 in)
- Position: Centre-back

Team information
- Current team: FK Gornji Rahic
- Number: 24

Youth career
- Željezničar
- Mladost Doboj Kakanj

Senior career*
Years	Team	Apps	(Gls)
2021-2023	Mladost Doboj Kakanj	63	(2)
2024	Hougang United	17	(0)
2025–	FK Gornji Rahic	0	(0)
- * Club domestic league appearances and goals as of 5 January 2024

Faris Hasić (born 13 June 2003) is a Bosnian professional footballer who plays primarily as a centre-back for First League of the Federation of Bosnia and Herzegovina club FK Gornji Rahic.

== Career ==
=== FK Mladost Doboj Kakanj ===
Hasić started his career with FK Mladost Doboj Kakanj.

=== Hougang United ===
On 18 April 2024, it was announced that Hasić had signed for Singapore Premier League club Hougang United for the 2024/25 Singapore Premier League campaign to help bolster the Cheetah's defence, where he would be often paired up with Ensar Brunčević at the back. On 10 May 2024, he made his debut in a 1–4 defeat to the Lion City Sailors in the opening day of the season. On 23 July 2024, with an incredible defensive display, he helped his side clinch their first win and 3 points of the season against Albirex Niigata (S). On 18 December 2024, it was confirmed that Hasić would be departing from the club alongside Ensar Brunčević and Petar Banović, with the young Bosnian defender making 17 appearances and providing 2 assists overall.

== Career statistics ==
As of 13 January 2025

Club	Season	League			Cup		Continental		Other		Total	
Club	Season	Division	Apps	Goals	Apps	Goals	Apps	Goals	Apps	Goals	Apps	Goals
Mladost Doboj Kakanj	2021–22	First League of FBiH	22	0	0	0	–		–		22	0
Mladost Doboj Kakanj	2022–23	First League of FBiH	26	2	0	0	–		–		26	2
Mladost Doboj Kakanj	2023–24	First League of FBiH	15	0	0	0	–		–		15	0
Mladost Doboj Kakanj	Total		63	2	0	0	0	0	0	0	63	2
Hougang United	2024–25	Singapore Premier League	17	0	0	0	–		–		17	0
Career total			80	2	0	0	0	0	0	0	80	2
