= Dejan Račić =

Montenegrin footballer (born 1998)

Personal information
- Full name: Dejan Račić
- Date of birth: 15 July 1998 (age 28)
- Place of birth: Berane, FR Yugoslavia
- Height: 1.88 m (6 ft 2 in)
- Position: Striker

Team information
- Current team: Geylang International

Youth career
- Berane
- OFK Beograd
- Voždovac

Senior career*
Years	Team	Apps	(Gls)
2016–2018	Voždovac	1	(0)
2017–2018	→ BSK Borča (loan)		
2018–2019	Iskra Danilovgrad	7	(0)
2019	Mornar	15	(4)
2019–2020	Grbalj	16	(2)
2021	BSK Borča	0	(0)
2021–2022	Zemun	0	(0)
2022–2023	Berane	20	(9)
2023–2024	Mornar	14	(0)
2024–2025	Hougang United	28	(24)
2025–2026	Bhayangkara Presisi	2	(0)
2025–2026	→ Persita Tangerang (loan)	15	(0)
2026–	Geylang International	0	(0)

International career
2016	Montenegro U19	4	(0)
- * Club domestic league appearances and goals as of 16 May 2026

Dejan Račić (Serbian Cyrillic: Дејан Рачић; born 15 July 1998) is a Montenegrin professional footballer who plays primarily as a striker for Singapore Premier League club Geylang International. He is known for his finishing, headers and work rate. He also holds the Serbian passport.

== Club career ==
=== Voždovac ===
Born in Berane, Račić started playing football with local club with the same name. Later was with OFK Beograd, before he joined Voždovac. Shortly after he was called into Montenegro U19 national team, Račić signed a three-year deal with the club in spring 2016. He made his senior debut in 35 fixture match of 2015–16 Serbian SuperLiga season, against Partizan on 7 May 2016.

==== BSK Borča (loan) ====
On 1 September 2017, Račić was loaned out to BSK Borča for the rest of the year.

=== Iskra Danilovgrad ===
In January 2019, Račić then joined Montenegrin club Iskra Danilovgrad. He played only seven league games for the club, before he left one year later.

=== Mornar ===
On 13 February 2019, Račić joined Mornar, however halfway throughout the mid season, he left the club.

=== Grbalj ===
In July 2019, Račić joined Grbalj. On 20 July 2020, he was released by the club.

=== BSK Borča ===
After being without a club for 6 months, Račić moved back to Serbia to joined with BSK Borča in February 2021.

=== Zemun ===
On 5 August 2021, Račić joined Zemun.

=== Berane ===
In July 2022, Račić then moved abroad to joined Montenegrin club Berane. On 28 August, he scored his first goal for the club scoring the only goal which secure the three points against Podgorica. On 27 November, Račić scored his first career hat-trick in a 3–1 win over OFK Nikšić.

=== 2nd stint at Mornar ===
In July 2023, Račić then rejoined Mornar.

=== Hougang United ===
On 10 June 2024, Račić moved to Southeast Asia to joined Singapore Premier League club Hougang United. On 11 August, he scored a hat-trick in a 5–1 win over Tanjong Pagar United bringing up his tally to 8 goals in 9 league appearances.

=== Bhayangkara Presisi Lampung ===
On 23 July 2025, Račić moved to Indonesia to join Indonesian Super League club Bhayangkara Persisi for the 2025–26 campaign, joining former teammate Stjepan Plazonja.

== Career statistics ==
=== Club ===
As of 16 May 2026

Club	Season	League			Cup		Continental		Other		Total	
Club	Season	Division	Apps	Goals	Apps	Goals	Apps	Goals	Apps	Goals	Apps	Goals
Voždovac	2015–16	SuperLiga	1	0	—		—		—		1	0
Voždovac	2016–17	SuperLiga	0	0	0	0	—		—		0	0
Voždovac	Total		1	0	0	0	—		—		1	0
Iskra Danilovgrad	2017–18	Montenegrin First League	5	0	0	0	0	0	0	0	5	0
Iskra Danilovgrad	2018–19	Montenegrin First League	2	0	0	0	0	0	0	0	2	0
Iskra Danilovgrad	Total		7	0	0	0	0	0	0	0	7	0
Mornar	2018–19	Montenegrin First League	15	4	0	0	0	0	0	0	15	4
Mornar	Total		15	4	0	0	0	0	0	0	15	4
Grbalj	2019–20	Montenegrin First League	16	2	3	0	0	0	0	0	19	2
Grbalj	Total		16	2	3	0	0	0	0	0	19	2
BSK Borča	2020–21	Serbian League Belgrade	??	??	0	0	0	0	0	0	??	??
BSK Borča	Total		??	??	0	0	0	0	0	0	??	??
Zemun	2021–22	Serbian League Belgrade	??	??	0	0	0	0	0	0	??	??
Zemun	Total		??	??	0	0	0	0	0	0	??	??
Berane	2022–23	Montenegrin Second League	20	9	0	0	0	0	2	0	22	9
Berane	Total		20	9	0	0	0	0	2	0	22	9
Mornar	2023–24	Montenegrin First League	14	0	2	1	0	0	0	0	16	1
Mornar	Total		14	0	2	1	0	0	0	0	16	1
Hougang United	2024–25	Singapore Premier League	28	24	1	1	0	0	0	0	29	25
Hougang United	Total		28	24	1	1	0	0	0	0	29	25
Bhayangkara Presisi	2025–26	Super League	2	0	0	0	0	0	0	0	2	0
Bhayangkara Presisi	Total		2	0	0	0	0	0	0	0	2	0
Persita Tangerang (loan)	2025–26	Super League	15	0	0	0	0	0	0	0	15	0
Persita Tangerang (loan)	Total		15	0	0	0	0	0	0	0	15	0
Geylang International	2026–27	Singapore Premier League	6	2	0	0	0	0	0	0	6	2
Geylang International	Total		6	2	0	0	0	0	0	0	6	2
Career total			124	41	6	2	0	0	0	0	130	43
