= Ensar Brunčević =

Serbian footballer

Personal information
- Date of birth: 13 February 1999 (age 27)
- Place of birth: Novi Pazar, FR Yugoslavia
- Height: 1.96 m (6 ft 5 in)
- Position: Centre-back

Team information
- Current team: Novi Pazar
- Number: 5

Senior career*
Years	Team	Apps	(Gls)
2019	Jošanica	0	(0)
2019–2020	Spartak Subotica	0	(0)
2019–2020	Spartak Subotica II	0	(0)
2020–2022	Balestier Khalsa	44	(6)
2023	Novi Pazar	9	(0)
2024	Hougang United	19	(1)
2025–	Novi Pazar	20	(0)
- * Club domestic league appearances and goals as of 12 June 2026

Ensar Brunčević (born 13 February 1999) is a Serbian professional footballer who plays primarily as a centre-back for Serbian SuperLiga club FK Novi Pazar.

== Career ==
=== Balestier Khalsa ===
On 1 February 2020, Brunčević joined Singaporean club, Balestier Khalsa playing in the Singapore Premier League on a two-year contract. He scored his 1st goal for the Tigers in the 2nd match of the season against Albirex Niigata (S). Brunčević than went on to score another goal in the 3rd match against Young Lions. As of 31 October 2020, all three of Brunčević's goals that season had come inside the six-yard box. At the end of the 2022 Singapore Premier League season, he left the club, having made 56 appearances for Balestier Khalsa and scoring 6 goals in all competitions.

=== FK Novi Pazar ===
On 1 January 2023, Brunčević returned to his native country to join Serbian SuperLiga outfit, FK Novi Pazar.

=== Hougang United ===
On 23 February 2024, it was announced that Brunčević had returned to Singapore to join Singapore Premier League club Hougang United. He made his debut for the Cheetahs in a 3–1 win against the Lion City Sailors in a pre-season friendly match of the Singapore Premier League. On 14 April 2024, Brunčević scored a header as his first goal for the Cheetahs from a corner against the Young Lions in their 4th pre-season match. On 30 August 2024, he scored his first league goal by a header in a 1–1 draw against Tampines Rovers. On 18 December 2024, it was announced that Brunčević would depart from the club alongside Petar Banović and Faris Hasić, with the Serbian defender ending his career with the Cheetahs making a total of 19 appearances and scoring 1 goal.

Return to FK Novi Pazar

On 1 January 2025, it was announced that Brunčević had return to Serbia to resign for his hometown club FK Novi Pazar.

== Career statistics ==
=== Club ===
As of 15 Dec 2024

Club	Season	League			Nation Cup		League Cup		AFC/UEFA		Total	
Club	Season	Division	Apps	Goals	Apps	Goals	Apps	Goals	Apps	Goals	Apps	Goals
Balestier Khalsa	2020	Singapore Premier League	5	3	0	0	0	0	0	0	5	3
Balestier Khalsa	2021	Singapore Premier League	18	1	0	0	0	0	0	0	18	1
Balestier Khalsa	2022	Singapore Premier League	14	2	0	0	0	0	0	0	14	2
Balestier Khalsa	Total		37	6	0	0	0	0	0	0	37	6
FK Novi Pazar	2022–23	Serbian SuperLiga	4	0	0	0	0	0	0	0	4	0
FK Novi Pazar	2023–24	Serbian SuperLiga	5	0	0	0	0	0	0	0	5	0
FK Novi Pazar	2024–25	Serbian SuperLiga	3	0	0	0	0	0	0	0	3	0
FK Novi Pazar	2025–26	Serbian SuperLiga	15	0	2	0	0	0	1	0	18	0
FK Novi Pazar	Total		27	0	2	0	0	0	1	0	30	0
Hougang United	2024–25	Singapore Premier League	19	1	0	0	0	0	0	0	19	1
Hougang United	Total		19	1	0	0	0	0	0	0	19	1
Career total			78	7	2	0	0	0	1	0	81	7
