= Daniel Alemão =

Brazilian footballer (born 1999)

Personal information
- Full name: Daniel Henrique Parreiras Aleixo
- Date of birth: 4 April 1999 (age 27)
- Place of birth: Brazil
- Height: 1.93 m (6 ft 4 in)
- Position: Centre-back

Team information
- Current team: Persiraja Banda Aceh
- Number: 3

Senior career*
Years	Team	Apps	(Gls)
2019–2020	União da Madeira	10	(0)
2020	1º de Dezembro	8	(0)
2021–2022	Esperança de Lagos	17	(1)
2023	Lusitano de Évora	24	(0)
2023–2024	Serpa	17	(0)
2024	Benfica de Macau	9	(1)
2024	Cebu	5	(0)
2025	Hougang United	11	(2)
2025–2026	Dainava Alytus	11	(1)
2026	Gala	0	(0)
2026–	Persiraja Banda Aceh	1	(0)
- * Club domestic league appearances and goals as of 2 October 2026

Daniel Henrique Parreiras Aleixo (born 4 April 1999), commonly known as Daniel Alemão, is a Brazilian professional footballer who plays as a centre-back for Championship club Persiraja Banda Aceh.

== Club career ==
Alemão began his professional football career in the lower tiers of Portuguese football, playing for several clubs including União da Madeira, 1º de Dezembro, Esperança de Lagos, Lusitano de Évora, and Serpa. In 2024, he moved to Southeast Asia to join Philippines Football League side Cebu, before continuing his regional stint with Singapore Premier League club Hougang United in 2025. He made his league debut on 19 January 2025, as starting line-up, which ended 3–1 home win against Balestier Khalsa. On 22 February 2025, he scored his first league goal for The Cheetah against Young Lions in a 3–3 draw.

Then, he returned to Europe to play for Lithuanian A Lyga side Dainava Alytus. He made his league debut on 14 July 2025, as starting line-up, which ended 0–3 lose against Panevėžys. On 12 September 2025, he scored his first goal in an A Lyga match against Džiugas Telšiai in a 1–1 draw.

In April 2026, Alemão joined Macanese club Gala. On 4 August 2026, Alemão officially signed with Indonesian club Persiraja Banda Aceh to strengthen their defense for the 2026–27 season. He made his league debut for Persiraja on 2 October 2026, in a 0–1 home lose over Sumsel United at the H. Dimurthala Stadium.
