= Nazhiim Harman =

Singaporean footballer

Personal information
- Full name: Muhammad Nazhiim bin Harman
- Date of birth: 2 March 1999 (age 27)
- Place of birth: Singapore
- Height: 1.76 m (5 ft 9 in)
- Positions: Centre-back; full-back

Team information
- Current team: Retired

Senior career*
Years	Team	Apps	(Gls)
2018–2021	Young Lions	11	(0)
2022	Hougang United	16	(0)
2023	Geylang International	5	(0)
2024-2025	Hougang United	18	(1)
- * Club domestic league appearances and goals

Muhammad Nazhiim bin Harman (born 2 March 1999 in Singapore), better known as Nazhiim, is a Singaporean former footballer who played primarily as a centre-back. Primarily a centre-back, Nazhiim is also capable of playing as a full-back.

== Career statistics ==
=== Club ===
As of match played 30 Sept 2023. Caps and goals may not be correct.

Club	Season	S.League		Singapore Cup		League Cup Charity Shield		Asia		Total	
Club	Season	Apps	Goals	Apps	Goals	Apps	Goals	Apps	Goals	Apps	Goals
Young Lions FC	2018	6	0	0	0	0	0	0	0	6	0
Young Lions FC	2020	0	0	0	0	0	0	0	0	0	0
Young Lions FC	2021	5	0	0	0	0	0	0	0	5	0
Young Lions FC	Total	11	0	0	0	0	0	0	0	11	0
Hougang United	2022	15	0	1	0	0	0	0	0	16	0
Hougang United	Total	15	0	1	0	0	0	0	0	16	0
Geylang International	2023	5	0	0	0	0	0	0	0	5	0
Geylang International	Total	5	0	0	0	0	0	0	0	5	0
Hougang United	2024–25	0	0	0	0	0	0	0	0	0	0
Hougang United	Total	0	0	0	0	0	0	0	0	0	0
Career total		31	0	1	0	0	0	0	0	32	0

== Honours ==
=== Club ===
Hougang United

- Singapore Cup: 2022
