= Stjepan Plazonja =

Croatian footballer

Personal information
- Date of birth: 2 January 1998 (age 28)
- Place of birth: Đakovo, Croatia
- Height: 1.92 m (6 ft 4 in)
- Position: Winger

Youth career
- 2012–2013: Cibalia
- 2013–2017: Osijek
- 2017: Dinamo Zagreb

Senior career*
Years	Team	Apps	(Gls)
2017–2018	Koper	1	(0)
2018–2019	Kustošija	18	(2)
2019–2021	Hermannstadt	13	(0)
2020	→ 1599 Șelimbăr (loan)	0	(0)
2020–2021	→ Politehnica Timișoara (loan)	26	(4)
2022	Concordia Chiajna	13	(0)
2023–2024	Bijelo Brdo	25	(4)
2023	Rudeš	4	(0)
2023–2024	Široki Brijeg	6	(0)
2024–2025	Hougang United	27	(14)
2025–2026	Bhayangkara Presisi	14	(0)
2026	Asia Talas	10	(0)
2026	Al-Jeel	4	(0)
- * Club domestic league appearances and goals as of 10 March 2026

Stjepan Plazonja (born 2 January 1998), better known as Stipe, is a Croatian professional footballer who plays as a winger. He is best known for his explosive pace, dribbling, finishing, crossing and power shots.

== Club career ==
=== Early career ===
Plazonja started his football career with Cibalia at the age of 14 before moving to Osijek in 2013. After spending 5 years with Osijek, Plazonja was rewarded with a move to Croatian giants Dinamo Zagreb on 20 February 2017 spending most of the times in the team academy.

==== Koper ====
On 4 September 2017, Plazonja signed his first professional contract with Slovenian club Koper. He make his debut on 6 September coming on as a substitute during the 2017–18 Slovenian Football Cup Round of 16 tie against Triglav Kranj.

=== Kustošija ===
On 10 August 2018, Plazonja moved back to Croatia to signed for Kustošija. In his second game for the club on 31 August, he scored his first professional career goal scoring the third goal for the team in a 3–2 win over Dugopolje. On 20 October, Plazonja scored the winning goal in the 79th minute in a 2–1 league win over Međimurje.

=== Hermannstadt ===
On 5 September 2019, Plazonja signed with Romanian club Hermannstadt. He make his debut on 21 September in a goalless draw against Sepsi OSK.

==== Șelimbăr (loan) ====
Plazonja then moved on loan to Șelimbăr on 12 February 2020 until the end of the season on 30 June 2020.

==== Politehnica Timișoara (loan) ====
Plazonja was then loan to second division club Politehnica Timișoara on 27 August 2020. He went on to score 4 goals in 28 appearances in all competition for the club.

=== Concordia Chiajna ===
On 29 January 2022, Plazonja signed for Romania club, Concordia Chiajna. He was released by the club on 31 July after making 13 appearances for the club.

=== Bijelo Brdo ===
On 14 September 2022, Plazonja returned to Croatia to signed for Bijelo Brdo. He went on to score on his debut Solin in a 2–1 league win on 24 September.

=== Rudeš ===
On 7 July 2023, Plazonja joined the Rudeš. He make his club debut against Osijek on 30 July in a 3–4 loss.

=== Široki Brijeg ===
On 8 September 2023, Plazonja signed for Bosnian club Široki Brijeg on a 2 years contract. However, he was released 6 months into his contract.

=== Hougang United ===
On 9 March 2024, Plazonja moved to Southeast Asia to signed with Singapore Premier League club Hougang United for the 2024–25 season. On 10 May 2024, he made his club debut in a 4–1 defeat to Lion City Sailors. He would then go on to make his second league appearance in a 1–0 defeat to Albirex Niigata (S) but was subbed out as he sustained a hamstring injury which made him unavailable for the club third league match against Tanjong Pagar United. On 14 June 2024, he returned from injury and was subbed on for Justin Hui, where he recorded his first league goal and assist in a 2–6 defeat to rival club Geylang International. On 11 August 2024, he won a man of the match award in a 5–1 win against Tanjong Pagar United, where he recorded two goals and two assists. Plazonja clocked in an incredible 36.90 km/h tying with former Real Madrid and Wales international footballer, Gareth Bale as the second world's fastest player ahead of world renowned footballer Kylian Mbappé at 36.70 km/h and behind Tottenham Hotspurs player, Micky van de Ven at 37.38 km/h in a 1–0 win over the Eagles.

== Career statistics ==
=== Club ===
As of 29 December 2025

Club	Season	League			Cup		Continental		Other		Total	
Club	Season	Division	Apps	Goals	Apps	Goals	Apps	Goals	Apps	Goals	Apps	Goals
NK Kustošija	2018–19	First Football League (Croatia)	18	2	0	0	0	0	0	0	18	2
NK Kustošija	Total		18	2	0	0	0	0	0	0	18	2
FC Hermannstadt	2019–20	Liga II	1	0	0	0	0	0	0	0	1	0
FC Hermannstadt	Total		1	0	0	0	0	0	0	0	1	0
CSC 1599 Șelimbăr (loan)	2019–20	Liga II	0	0	0	0	0	0	0	0	0	0
CSC 1599 Șelimbăr (loan)	Total		0	0	0	0	0	0	0	0	0	0
SSU Poli (loan)	2020–21	Liga II	26	4	0	0	0	0	0	0	26	4
SSU Poli (loan)	Total		26	4	0	0	0	0	0	0	26	4
FC Hermannstadt	2021–22	Liga II	12	0	0	0	0	0	0	0	12	0
FC Hermannstadt	Total		12	0	0	0	0	0	0	0	12	0
CS Concordia Chiajna	2021–22	Liga II	13	0	0	0	0	0	0	0	13	0
CS Concordia Chiajna	Total		13	0	0	0	0	0	0	0	13	0
Bijelo Brdo	2022–23	First Football League (Croatia)	25	4	0	0	0	0	0	0	25	4
Bijelo Brdo	Total		25	4	0	0	0	0	0	0	25	4
NK Rudeš	2023–24	Croatian Football League	4	0	0	0	0	0	0	0	4	0
NK Rudeš	Total		4	0	0	0	0	0	0	0	4	0
NK Široki Brijeg	2023–24	Premier League of BH	6	0	0	0	0	0	0	0	6	0
NK Široki Brijeg	Total		6	0	0	0	0	0	0	0	6	0
Hougang United	2024–25	SPL	27	14	0	0	0	0	0	0	27	14
Hougang United	Total		27	14	0	0	0	0	0	0	27	14
Bhayangkara Presisi	2025–26	Super League	13	0	0	0	0	0	0	0	13	0
Bhayangkara Presisi	Total		13	0	0	0	0	0	0	0	13	0
Career total			145	24	0	0	0	0	0	0	145	24
