= Petar Banović =

Serbian footballer

Personal information
- Date of birth: 11 September 1997 (age 29)
- Place of birth: Livno, Bosnia and Herzegovina
- Height: 1.88 m (6 ft 2 in)
- Positions: Forward; attacking midfielder

Team information
- Current team: Hougang United
- Number: 44

Senior career*
Years	Team	Apps	(Gls)
2016-2017	NK Sesvete	10	(1)
2017	HNK Gorica	3	(0)
2017-2018	NK Neretvanac Opuzen	0	(0)
2018	FK Krupa	10	(0)
2018-2019	NK Lučko	3	(0)
2019	NK Kurilovec	0	(0)
2019-2020	HNK Tomislav	0	(0)
2020	NK Neretvanac Opuzen	0	(0)
2020-2021	Ægir	0	(0)
2021-2024	HNK Tomislav	61	(22)
2024	Hougang United	12	(1)
- * Club domestic league appearances and goals as of 18 December 2024

Petar Banović (born 11 September 1997) is a Croatian professional footballer who most recently played primarily as a second-striker for Singapore Premier League club Hougang United. Petar plays primarily as a second-striker, but he is also capable of playing as a striker or attacking-midfielder.

== Career ==
=== NK Sesvete ===
On 7 August 2015, he joined NK Sesvete youth team before promoted and played 10 matches for the team.

=== HNK Gorica ===
On 14 February 2017, he signed for HNK Gorica before leaving after 6 months.

=== NK Neretvanac Opuzen ===
On 21 August 2017, he signed for NK Neretvanac Opuzen but left the club without playing a game.

=== FK Krupa ===
On 14 February 2018, he returned to Bosnia club, FK Krupa and appeared 10 times for the team.

=== NK Lučko ===
On 21 August 2018, he signed for NK Lučko.

=== NK Kurilovec ===
On 5 March 2019, he signed for NK Kurilovec.

=== HNK Tomislav ===
On 6 August 2019, he signed for HNK Tomislav.

=== NK Neretvanac Opuzen (2nd stint) ===
On 17 February 2020, he returned to NK Neretvanac Opuzen.

=== Knattspyrnufélagið Ægir ===
On 6 August 2020, he signed for Knattspyrnufélagið Ægir.

=== HNK Tomislav (2nd stint) ===
On 6 August 2021, he returned to HNK Tomislav. He scored 22 league goals for the team before leaving after end of his contract.

=== Hougang United ===
On 9 March 2024, Petar was announced as a new player for Singapore Premier League club Hougang United for the 2024/25 Singapore Premier League season. He made his debut in a 4–1 defeat to the Lion City Sailors.

== Career statistics ==
=== Club ===
As of 15 June 2024

Club	Season	League			Cup		Continental		Other		Total	
Club	Season	Division	Apps	Goals	Apps	Goals	Apps	Goals	Apps	Goals	Apps	Goals
HNK Tomislav	2021–22	First League of BH	20	3	0	0	0	0	0	0	20	3
HNK Tomislav	2022–23	First League of BH	27	13	0	0	0	0	0	0	27	13
HNK Tomislav	2023–24	First League of BH	14	6	1	0	0	0	0	0	15	6
HNK Tomislav	Total		14	6	1	0	0	0	0	0	15	6
Hougang United	2024–25	SPL	2	0	0	0	0	0	0	0	2	0
Hougang United	Total		2	0	0	0	0	0	0	0	2	0
Career total			106	11	0	0	0	0	0	0	106	11
