= 2025–26 Albirex Niigata Singapore FC season =

Albirex Niigata (S)
2025–26 season
- Chairman: Daisuke Korenaga
- Head coach: (Japan) Keiji Shigetomi
- Stadium: Jurong East Stadium
Home colours	Away colours

The 2025–26 season is Albirex Niigata Singapore's 22nd consecutive season in the top flight of Singapore football and in the Singapore Premier League, having joined the league in 2004. Along with the 2024–25 Singapore Premier League, the club will also compete in the Singapore Cup.

Albirex Niigata Singapore is in transition to a local outfit from the 2024–25 season onwards, which mean that they will have to abide by the same competition rules as local teams, including the foreign player quota.

== Squad ==
=== Singapore Premier League ===
As of 10 Apr 2026

Squad no.	Name	Nationality	Date of birth (age)	Previous club	Contract start	Contract end
Goalkeepers
1	Takahiro Koga	(Japan)	11 March 1999 (age 27)	(Japan) FC Osaka (J3)	2025	2026
18	Hassan Sunny	(Singapore)	2 April 1984 (age 42)	(Singapore) Lion City Sailors	2023	2026
25	Dylan Pereira	(Singapore)	31 July 2000 (age 26)	(Singapore) Police SA	2024	2026
31	Eizlan Haiqal Herman	(Singapore)	25 July 2005 (age 21)	(Singapore) Albirex Niigata (S) U21	2024	2026
40	Danysh Basir	(Singapore)	9 March 2007 (age 19)	(Singapore) Albirex Niigata (S) U21	2025	2026
41	Iskandar Abdul Latiff	(Singapore)	23 July 2007 (age 19)	(Singapore) Warwick Knights	2026	2026
61	Kaidan Rune Ferrell		22 September 2008 (age 18)	(Singapore) Balestier Khalsa U17	2026	2026
71	Noor Aydrin	(Singapore)	25 March 2008 (age 18)	(Singapore) Albirex Niigata (S) U17	2025	2026
81	Aqeel Salleh	(Singapore)	26 July 2008 (age 18)	(Singapore) East Coast United U17	2026	2026
Defenders
2	Kim Tae-uk	(North Korea) (Japan)	20 June 1998 (age 28)	(Japan) Yokogawa Musashino (J4)	2025	2026
3	Nozomi Ozawa	(Japan)	16 February 2003 (age 23)	(Japan) Ryutsu Keizai University	2024	2026
5	Komei Iida	(Japan)	17 March 2003 (age 23)	(Japan) Komazawa University	2025	2026
7	Zulqarnaen Suzliman	(Singapore)	29 March 1998 (age 28)	(Singapore) Lion City Sailors	2025	2026
13	Daniel Martens	(Singapore)	25 February 1999 (age 27)	(Singapore) Tanjong Pagar United	2024	2026
16	Cho Eun-su	(South Korea)	12 March 2004 (age 22)	(Japan) FC Ryukyu (J3)	2025	2026
20	Sim Jun Yen	(Singapore)	28 September 2007 (age 19)	(Singapore) Albirex Niigata (S) U21	2023	2026
23	Delwinder Singh	(Singapore)	5 August 1992 (age 34)	Singapore Khalsa Association	2025	2026
26	Aneeq Fairus	(Singapore)	9 June 2007 (age 19)	(Singapore) Albirex Niigata (S) U21	2023	2026
27	Ahmad Martin Roslan	(Singapore)	6 August 2008 (age 18)	(Singapore) Albirex Niigata (S) U21	2024	2026
33	Aqil Zafri Junaidi	(Singapore)	6 October 2007 (age 19)	(Singapore) Albirex Niigata (S) U21	2024	2026
34	Arsyad Arzain	(Singapore)	22 February 2007 (age 19)	(Singapore) Albirex Niigata (S) U21	2023	2026
35	Sachin Kabilan Chandra	(Singapore)	24 January 2007 (age 19)	(Singapore) Albirex Niigata (S) U21	2023	2026
36	Dani Qalish	(Singapore)	20 May 2008 (age 18)	(Singapore) Lion City Sailors U17	2025	2026
37	Khaalish Aaqil Noorhaslan	(Singapore)	26 March 2007 (age 19)	(Singapore) Albirex Niigata (S) U21	2024	2026
38	Aydin Zufayri Putra	(Singapore)	7 September 2008 (age 18)	(Singapore) Albirex Niigata (S) U17	2026	2026
62	Tom Bradley	(England)	3 May 2009 (age 17)	Hong Kong FC Youth	2026	2026
63	Evan Teo Zuo Quan	(Singapore)	25 October 2007 (age 19)	(Singapore) BG Tampines Rovers U17	2026	2026
64	Wirth Kaylan	(Singapore) (Germany)	9 October 2008 (age 18)	(Singapore) Albirex Niigata (S) U15	2026	2026
67	Derric Luke Kumar	(Singapore)	20 June 2009 (age 17)	(Singapore) Albirex Niigata (S) U17	2023	2026
69	Yap Ho Wai	(Singapore)	15 May 2007 (age 19)	(Singapore) Republic Polytechnic	2026	2026
70	Sachin Sajeev	(Singapore)	20 February 2008 (age 18)	(Singapore) Albirex Niigata (S) U17	2025	2026
72	Rowan Shah	(Singapore)	16 March 2009 (age 17)	(Singapore) Hougang United U17	2026	2026
79	Xantos Jacobus	(Philippines)	21 January 2008 (age 18)	(Singapore) Albirex Niigata (S) U17	2025	2026
Midfielders
6	Naoki Yoshioka	(Japan)	6 April 2002 (age 24)	(Japan) Osaka UHSS	2025	2026
8	Ren Nishimura	(Japan)	15 June 2005 (age 21)	(Japan) V-Varen Nagasaki (J2)	2025	2026
10	Takumi Yokohata	(Japan)	15 August 2002 (age 24)	(Japan) Kyushu Sangyo University	2025	2026
11	Katsuyuki Ishibashi	(Japan)	10 January 2002 (age 24)	(Japan) FC Osaka (J3)	2025	2026
14	Jaden Heng	(Singapore)	10 November 2008 (age 18)	(Singapore) Albirex Niigata (S) U21	2024	2026
15	Syed Firdaus Hassan	(Singapore)	30 May 1998 (age 28)	(Singapore) BG Tampines Rovers	2024	2026
22	Nicky Melvin Singh	(Singapore) (Philippines)	13 June 2002 (age 24)	(Singapore) SAFSA	2021	2026
24	Soshi Kadowaki	(Japan)	13 November 2001 (age 25)	Singapore FC	2025	2026
29	Danish Qayyum	(Singapore)	2 February 2002 (age 24)	(Singapore) Young Lions	2025	2026
42	Haziq Kamarudin	(Singapore)	6 March 2001 (age 25)	(Singapore) Young Lions	2024	2026
45	Jarrel Ong Jia Wei	(Singapore) (China)	26 October 2002 (age 24)	(Singapore) Hougang United U21	2023	2026
Forwards
17	Helmi Shahrol	(Singapore)	31 July 2008 (age 18)	(Singapore) Albirex Niigata (S) U21	2023	2026
19	Syukri Bashir	(Singapore)	11 April 1998 (age 28)	(Singapore) Tanjong Pagar United	2024	2026
21	Abdul Rasaq	(Singapore) (Nigeria)	16 June 2001 (age 25)	(Singapore) Lion City Sailors	2026	2026
28	Liska Haaziq Iskandar	(Singapore)	30 April 2007 (age 19)	(Singapore) Albirex Niigata (S) U21	2023	2026
30	Shakthi Vinayagavijayan	(Singapore)	28 May 2003 (age 23)	(Singapore) SAFSA	2022	2026
39	Ryang Hyon-ju	(North Korea) (Japan)	31 May 1998 (age 28)	(Japan) Veertien Mie (J4)	2025	2026
99	Shingo Nakano	(Japan)	26 December 2004 (age 21)	(United States) El Camino College (Amateur)	2024	2026
	Keisuke Honda	(Japan)	13 June 1986 (age 40)	(Bhutan) Paro FC	2026	2027
Players who left club on loan during season
2	Junki Kenn Yoshimura	(Singapore) (Japan)	20 July 2004 (age 22)	(Singapore) Albirex Niigata (S) U21	2021	2026
Players who left club for NS during season
54	Kenji Austin	(Singapore) (Japan)	24 February 2004 (age 22)	(Singapore) Active SG	2020	2025
	Ashvin Vela	(Singapore)	3 March 2005 (age 21)	(Singapore) Hougang United U21	2024	2026
21	Rauf Anaqi	(Singapore)	6 March 2008 (age 18)	(Singapore) Albirex Niigata (S) U21	2024	2026
Players who left club during season
4	Jared Gallagher	(Singapore) (Republic of Ireland)	18 January 2002 (age 24)	(Singapore) Balestier Khalsa	2025	2026
7	Amy Recha	(Singapore) (Indonesia)	13 May 1992 (age 34)	(Singapore) Hougang United	2024	2026
9	Lee Dong-yeol	(South Korea)	21 May 2004 (age 22)	(Japan) FC Osaka (J3)	2025	2026

== Coaching staff ==
First team

Position	Name
Team manager (men)	(Singapore) Dominic Wong
Head coach (men)	(Japan) Keiji Shigetomi
Head coach (women)	(Japan) Kana Kitahara
Head coach (SPL2); Assistant coach (men)	(Singapore) Jaswinder Singh
Assistant coach (women)	(Japan) Yuki Monden (Singapore) Nas Nastain
Goalkeeper coach (men)	(Singapore) Fadhil Salim
Goalkeeper coach (women)	(Singapore) Bryan Quek
Fitness coach (men)	(Singapore) Mark Anthony
Sports trainer	(Singapore) Kyler Wong Yiming (Singapore) Hafiz
Physiotherapist	(Singapore) Karen Koh (Singapore) Alison Soh
Analyst	(Singapore) Shaun Tan
Kitman	(Singapore) Roy Krishnan (Singapore) Muhammad Taufik
Interpreter	(Japan) Masayuki Kato

Academy

Position	Name
Head of youth	(Spain) Marcal Trulls
SPL 2 head coach	(Singapore) Jaswinder Singh
Under-19 head coach	
Under-17 head coach	(Spain) Marcal Trulls
Under-15 head coach	(Japan) Masayuki Kato
Under-13 head coach	(Singapore) Nas Nastain
Under-17 head coach (Albirex SG FA)	
Under-15 head coach (Albirex SG FA)	
Under-13 head coach (Albirex SG FA)	(Japan) Hiromasa Tanaka
Under-21 asst coach	(Singapore) Abdul Jamal (Singapore) Toi
Under-17 asst coach	(Japan) Keiji Shigetomi
Under-15 asst coach	(Singapore) Sazali Salleh
Under-13 asst coach	(Singapore) Juma'at Jantan
Goalkeeper coach (under-21)	(Singapore) Wan Shaifulrezza Bin Shes
Goalkeeper coach (under-17)	(Singapore) Hyrulnizam Juma'at
Goalkeeper coach (under-15)	(Singapore) Fadhilah Hassan
Under-21 fitness coach	(Singapore) Sufian
Under-21 trainer	(Singapore) Xin Yu

== Transfer ==
=== In ===
Preseason

Date (Note: Date of club's announcement, else will be 1 Jun-2025, the date which the free agent start due to lapse of previous contract)	Position	Player	Transferred from	Ref
First team
1 June 2025	MF	(Japan) (Iran) Arya Igami Tarhani	(Singapore) BG Tampines Rovers	End of loan
22 June 2025	MF	(Singapore) Syed Firdaus Hassan	(Singapore) BG Tampines Rovers	Free
24 June 2025	MF	(Singapore) (Philippines) Nicky Melvin Singh	(Singapore) SAFSA	End of NS
27 June 2025	MF	(Singapore) (Republic of Ireland) Jared Gallagher	(Singapore) BG Tampines Rovers	Free
29 June 2025	MF	(Singapore) Danish Qayyum	(Singapore) Lion City Sailors	Free
29 June 2025	FW	(South Korea) Lee Dong-yeol	(Japan) FC Osaka (J3)	6 months loan till Dec-25
2 July 2025	DF	(Japan) Komei Iida	(Japan) Komazawa University	Free
2 July 2025	MF	(Japan) Takumi Yokohata	(Japan) Kyushu Sangyo University	Free
4 July 2025	MF	(Japan) Ren Nishimura	(Japan) V-Varen Nagasaki (J2)	6 months loan till Dec-25
6 July 2025	DF	(South Korea) Cho Eun-su	(Japan) FC Ryukyu (J3)	Free
25 July 2025	GK	(Japan) Takahiro Koga	(Japan) FC Osaka (J3)	Free
25 July 2025	MF	(Japan) Katsuyuki Ishibashi	(Japan) FC Osaka (J3)	Season loan
27 July 2025	DF	(North Korea) (Japan) Kim Tae-uk	(Japan) Yokogawa Musashino (J4)	Free
11 August 2025	DF	(Singapore) Delwinder Singh	Singapore Khalsa Association	Free
SPL2, U23 & Academy
1 June 2025	GK	(Singapore) Firman Nabil	(Singapore) Young Lions	End of loan

Mid-season

Date (Note: Date of club's announcement, else will be 1 Jun-2025, the date which the free agent start due to lapse of previous contract)	Position	Player	Transferred from	Ref
First team
25 December 2025	FW	(North Korea) (Japan) Ryang Hyon-ju	(Japan) Veertien Mie (J4)	Free
5 January 2026	DF	(Singapore) Zulqarnaen Suzliman	(Singapore) Lion City Sailors	Season loan
15 January 2026	FW	(Singapore) (Nigeria) Abdul Rasaq	(Singapore) Lion City Sailors	Season loan
SPL2, U23 & Academy
13 November 2025	MF	(Singapore) Shakthi Vinayagavijayan	(Singapore) SAFSA	End of NS
1 April 2026	MF	(Singapore) Jarrel Ong Jia Wei	(Singapore) SAFSA	End of NS

Postseason

Date (Note: Date of club's announcement, else will be 1 Jun-2025, the date which the free agent start due to lapse of previous contract)	Position	Player	Transferred from	Ref
First team
10 April 2026	FW	(Japan) Keisuke Honda	Free Agent	N.A.
SPL2, U23 & Academy

=== Out ===
Preseason

Date (Note: Date of club's announcement, else will be 1 Jun-2025, the date which the free agent start due to lapse of previous contract)	Position	Player	Transferred To	Ref
First team
2 May 2025	MF	(Japan) Yohei Otake	Retired	N.A.
1 June 2025	DF	(Singapore) Syahrul Sazali	(Singapore) BG Tampines Rovers	End of loan (Note: Syahrul Sazali subsequently moves to Tanjong Pagar United after his contract with BG Tampines end.)
1 June 2025	MF	(Singapore) Syed Firdaus Hassan	(Singapore) BG Tampines Rovers	End of loan (Note: Syed Firdaus rejoins the team after his contract with BG Tampines end.)
4 June 2025	MF	(Japan) Taiki Maeda	(United States)	Free
5 June 2025	DF	(Japan) Koki Kawachi	(Japan) FC Bombonera (J6)	Free
6 June 2025	DF	(Japan) (Nigeria) SteviaEgbus Mikuni	(Thailand) Kasetsart	Free
6 June 2025	MF	(Singapore) Gareth Low	(Singapore) Geylang International	Free
6 June 2025	MF	(Singapore) Ho Wai Loon	(Singapore) Geylang International	Free
6 June 2025	FW	(Japan) Shuhei Hoshino	(Singapore) Geylang International	Free
30 June 2025	DF	(Singapore) Arshad Shamim	(Singapore)	Free
1 July 2025	MF	(Japan) (Iran) Arya Igami Tarhani	(Philippines) Cebu	Free
11 July 2025	GK	(Singapore) Zainol Gulam	(Singapore) Geylang International	Free
14 July 2025	FW	(Singapore) Daniel Goh	(Singapore) Balestier Khalsa	Free
SPL2, U23 & Academy
7 June 2025	MF	(Singapore) Hilman Norhisam	(Singapore)	Free
1 July 2025	GK	(Singapore) Firman Nabil	(Singapore) Young Lions	Free
1 July 2025	GK	(Singapore) Mika Airie Rosmaini Shah	(Singapore)	Free
1 July 2025	DF	(Singapore) Mathava Krishnan	(Singapore)	Free
1 July 2025	DF	(Singapore) Aeriel Syazwan	(Singapore)	Free
1 July 2025	DF	(Singapore) Harriz Danial	(Singapore)	Free
1 July 2025	MF	(Singapore) Preston Heng Yu Hng	(Singapore)	Free
1 July 2025	MF	(Singapore) Ilhan Azahar	(Singapore)	Free
1 July 2025	MF	(Singapore) Farhan Sahlan	(Singapore) Hougang United	Free
1 July 2025	FW	(Singapore) Nawfal Jailani	(Singapore)	Free
1 July 2025	FW	(Singapore) Rian Haziq Rosley	(Singapore)	Free

Mid-season

Date (Note: Date of club's announcement, else will be 1 Jun-2025, the date which the free agent start due to lapse of previous contract)	Position	Player	Transferred To	Ref
First team
17 December 2025	FW	(South Korea) Lee Dong-yeol	(Japan) FC Osaka (J3)	End of Loan
5 January 2026	FW	(Singapore) Amy Recha	(Japan) Albirex Niigata (S)	Free
11 January 2026	MF	(Singapore) (Republic of Ireland) Jared Gallagher	(Thailand) Nakhon Ratchasima	Free
January 2026	DF	(Singapore) Rauf Anaqi	(Singapore) Young Lions	Season loan
January 2026	MF	(Singapore) (Philippines) Aryan Boon	(Singapore) Hougang United	Free

=== National Services ===
Preseason

Date (Note: Date of club's announcement, else will be 1 Jun-2025, the date which the free agent start due to lapse of previous contract)	Position	Player	Transferred To	Ref
First team
December 2023	MF	(Singapore) Shakthi Vinayagavijayan	(Singapore) SAFSA	NS till December 2025
June 2024	MF	(Singapore) Jarrel Ong Jia Wei	(Singapore) SAFSA	NS till June 2026
14 August 2025	DF	(Singapore) (Japan) Junki Kenn Yoshimura	(Singapore) SAFSA	NS till July 2027
SPL2, U23 & Academy
January 2024	FW	(Singapore) Darwisy Hanis	(Singapore) Police SA	NS till January 2026
March 2025	DF	(Singapore) (Japan) Kenji Austin	(Singapore) SAFSA	NS till March 2027

=== Retained / Extension / Promoted ===
Date (Note: Date of club's announcement, else will be 1 Jun-2025, the date which the free agent start due to lapse of previous contract)	Position	Player	Ref
First team
21 June 2025	DF	(Singapore) (Japan) Junki Kenn Yoshimura	1 year contract till June 2026 (Note: Junki left for NS after signing contract.)
21 June 2025	MF	(Japan) Naoki Yoshioka	1 year contract till June 2026
22 June 2025	GK	(Singapore) Dylan Pereira	1 year contract till June 2026
23 June 2025	GK	(Singapore) Hassan Sunny	2 years contract till 2026
23 June 2025	MF	(Singapore) Haziq Kamarudin	1 year contract till June 2026
24 June 2025	FW	(Japan) Shingo Nakano	1 year contract till June 2026
25 June 2025	FW	(Singapore) Amy Recha	1 year contract till June 2026
27 June 2025	DF	(Japan) Nozomi Ozawa	1 year contract till June 2026
3 July 2025	FW	(Singapore) Syukri Bashir	1 year contract till June 2026
12 August 2025	DF	(Singapore) Daniel Martens	1 year contract till June 2026 (Note: Daniel Martens was earlier reported by the club to be released by the club on 21 June 2025, before signing an extension.)

== Friendly ==
=== Pre-season ===
Win Draw Loss

19 July 2025 1	Albirex Niigata (S) (Japan)	–	(Singapore) Tanjong Pagar United	Jurong East
				Stadium: Jurong East Stadium

26 July 2025 2	Albirex Niigata (S) (Japan)	4–2	(Singapore) Hougang United	Jurong East
				Stadium: Jurong East Stadium

2 August 2025 3	Albirex Niigata (S) (Japan)	–	(Singapore) Balestier Khalsa	Jurong East
				Stadium: Jurong East Stadium

8 August 2025 4	Albirex Niigata (S) (Japan)	1–0	(Singapore) BG Tampines Rovers	Jurong East
				Stadium: Jurong East Stadium

30 August 2025 5	Albirex Niigata (S) (Japan)	2–2	Singapore FC	Bukit Batok
			Liam Shotton; Joe Claridge	Stadium: Dulwich College

=== Mid-season ===
Win Draw Loss

6 December 2025 1	Johor Darul Ta'zim II (Malaysia)	1–2	(Japan) Albirex Niigata (S)	Johor
				Stadium: JDT Training Center

January 2026 4	Albirex Niigata (S) (Japan)	1–2	(Vietnam) Ninh Binh FC	Jalan Besar
				Stadium: Jalan Besar Stadium

== Team statistics ==
=== Appearances and goals ===
As of 16 May 26

No.	Pos.	Player	SPL		Singapore Cup		Total	
No.	Pos.	Player	Apps.	Goals	Apps.	Goals	Apps.	Goals
1	GK	(Japan) Takahiro Koga	2	0	0	0	2	0
2	DF	(North Korea) (Japan) Kim Tae-uk	21	2	6	1	27	3
3	DF	(Japan) Nozomi Ozawa	14	2	6	1	20	3
5	DF	(Japan) Komei Iida	15+3	1	2+1	0	21	1
6	MF	(Japan) Naoki Yoshioka	14+7	1	6	0	27	1
7	DF	(Singapore) Zulqarnaen Suzliman	17	1	0	0	17	1
8	MF	(Japan) Ren Nishimura	0+14	0	0+5	0	19	0
10	MF	(Japan) Takumi Yokohata	7+10	2	6	0	23	2
11	MF	(Japan) Katsuyuki Ishibashi	19+2	1	6	2	27	3
13	DF	(Singapore) Daniel Martens	0	0	0	0	0	0
14	MF	(Singapore) Jaden Heng	2+7	0	0+2	0	11	0
15	MF	(Singapore) Syed Firdaus Hassan	7+4	0	1+4	0	16	0
16	DF	(South Korea) Cho Eun-su	21	1	4+2	0	27	1
17	FW	(Singapore) Helmi Shahrol	0+2	0	0	0	2	0
18	GK	(Singapore) Hassan Sunny	19	0	6	0	25	0
19	FW	(Singapore) Syukri Bashir	0	0	0	0	0	0
20	DF	(Singapore) Sim Jun Yen	7+3	0	4	0	14	0
21	FW	(Singapore) (Nigeria) Abdul Rasaq	14+2	4	0	0	16	4
22	MF	(Singapore) (Philippines) Nicky Melvin Singh	1+18	2	2+4	0	25	2
23	DF	(Singapore) Delwinder Singh	0+3	0	0	0	3	0
24	MF	(Japan) Soshi Kadowaki	0+1	0	0	0	1	0
25	GK	(Singapore) Dylan Pereira	0	0	0	0	0	0
26	DF	(Singapore) Aneeq Fairus	0	0	0	0	0	0
27	DF	(Singapore) Ahmad Martin Roslan	0	0	0	0	0	0
28	FW	(Singapore) Liska Haaziq Iskandar	0+1	0	0	0	1	0
29	MF	(Singapore) Danish Qayyum	0+9	0	0+6	0	15	0
30	FW	(Singapore) Shakthi Vinayagavijayan	0+6	0	0	0	6	0
31	GK	(Singapore) Eizlan Haiqal Herman	0	0	0	0	0	0
33	DF	(Singapore) Aqil Zafri Junaidi	0+1	0	0	0	1	0
34	DF	(Singapore) Arsyad Arzain	0	0	0	0	0	0
36	DF	(Singapore) Dani Qalish	0	0	0	0	0	0
37	DF	(Singapore) Khaalish Aaqil Noorhaslan	0	0	0	0	0	0
39	FW	(North Korea) (Japan) Ryang Hyon-ju	13+4	7	0	0	17	7
42	MF	(Singapore) Haziq Kamarudin	15+1	0	6	0	22	0
99	FW	(Japan) Shingo Nakano	20+1	20	6	5	27	25
Players who have played this season but had left on loan to other club
2	DF	(Singapore) (Japan) Junki Kenn Yoshimura	0	0	0	0	0	0
21	MF	(Singapore) Rauf Anaqi	0	0	0	0	0	0
Players who have played this season but had left the club
4	MF	(Singapore) (Republic of Ireland) Jared Gallagher	3	0	4+2	0	9	0
7	FW	(Singapore) Amy Recha	0	0	0	0	0	0
9	MF	(South Korea) Lee Dong-yeol	1+3	0	0+1	0	5	0

== Competitions ==
=== Singapore Premier League ===
Win Draw Loss

23 August 2025 1	Albirex Niigata (S) (Japan)	2–2	(Singapore) Balestier Khalsa	Jurong East
	Katsuyuki Ishibashi 31'; Takumi Yokohata 34'; Lee Dong-yeol (yellow card) 26'; Jared Gallagher (yellow card) 49'; Sim Jun Yan (yellow card) 88'	Report	Mario Subarić 8'; Ignatius Ang 82'; Darren Teh (yellow card) 32'	Stadium: Jurong East Stadium; Referee: Jansen Foo; Man of the Match: (Japan) Takumi Yokohata

12 September 2025 2	Geylang International (Singapore)	0–2	(Japan) Albirex Niigata (S)	Jurong East
	Nikola Ignjatovic (yellow card) 70'; Nazrul Nazari (yellow card) 80'; Shakir Hamzah (yellow card) 83' (red card) 87'	Report	Shingo Nakano 45+3', 47'; Nicky Melvin Singh (yellow card) 82'	Stadium: Jurong East Stadium (Note: Location changed due to re-turfing of Our Tampines Hub); Referee: Ahmad A'Qashah; Man of the Match: (Japan) Shingo Nakano

30 April 2026 3 (Rescheduled)	Albirex Niigata (S) (Japan)	2–1	(Singapore) BG Tampines Rovers	Jurong East
	Shingo Nakano 45'; Abdul Rasaq 62' (yellow card) 6'; Jaden Heng (yellow card) 90+3'		Trent Buhagiar 45+1'; Koya Kazama (yellow card) 35'	Stadium: Jurong East Stadium; Referee: Muhammad Taqi

17 October 2025 4	Hougang United (Singapore)	0–4	(Japan) Albirex Niigata (S)	Jurong East
	Kanok Kongsimma (yellow card) 15'; Huzaifah Aziz (yellow card) 71' (yellow-red card) 84'	Report	Shingo Nakano 24', 45+4'; Nicky Melvin Singh 81', 87'	Stadium: Jurong East Stadium; Referee: Andrea Verolino; Man of the Match: (Japan) Shingo Nakano

27 October 2025 5 (Rescheduled)	Lion City Sailors (Singapore)	3–0	(Japan) Albirex Niigata (S)	Bishan
	Lennart Thy 19'; Bart Ramselaar 62'; Akram Azman 73'	Report	Takumi Yokohata (yellow card) 69'	Stadium: Bishan Stadium; Referee: Ahmad A'Qashah; Man of the Match: (Netherlands) Bart Ramselaar

4 May 2026 6 (Rescheduled)	Albirex Niigata (S) (Japan)	1–0	(Singapore) Young Lions	Jurong East
	Shingo Nakano 90+6' (pen.); Jaden Heng (yellow card) 13'; Komei Iida (yellow card) 63'; Cho Eun-su (yellow card) 68'	Report	Abner Vinicius (yellow card) 86'	Stadium: Jurong East Stadium; Referee: Thawfeek Ahamad; Man of the Match: (Brazil) Abner Vinicius

17 January 2026 7	Albirex Niigata (S) (Japan)	3–2	(Singapore) Tanjong Pagar United	Jurong East
	Cho Eun-su 42'; Takumi Yokohata 52'; Nozomi Ozawa 86'; Kim Tae-uk (yellow card) 72'	Report	Youssef Ezzejjari 55'; Anaqi Ismit 84'; Bruno Dybal (yellow card) 38'; Lee Chan-woo (yellow card) 51'	Stadium: Jurong East Stadium; Referee: Taufik Thana; Man of the Match: (South Korea) Cho Eun-su

25 January 2026 8	Balestier Khalsa (Singapore)	0–4	(Japan) Albirex Niigata (S)	Bishan
	Madhu Mohana (red card) 34'; Tajeli Salamat (yellow card) 56'	Report	Shingo Nakano 43', 58'; Kim Tae-uk 45+2'; Naoki Yoshioka 82'; Syed Firdaus (yellow card) 5'; Cho Eun-su (yellow card) 56'	Stadium: Bishan Stadium; Referee: Jansen Foo; Man of the Match: (Japan) Shingo Nakano

2 February 2026 9	Albirex Niigata (S) (Japan)	2–0	(Singapore) Geylang International	Jurong East
	Nozomi Ozawa 67'; Liska Haaziq Iskandar 90+1'; Syed Firdaus (yellow card) 6'; Naoki Yoshioka (yellow card) 65'; Zulqarnaen Suzliman (yellow card) 68'; Abdul Rasaq (yellow card) 69'; Nicky Melvin Singh (yellow card) 89'	Report	Nazrul Nazari (yellow card) 59'; Hasrin Jailani (yellow card) 85'	Stadium: Jurong East Stadium; Referee: Zulfiqar Mustaffa; Man of the Match: (Japan) Nozomi Ozawa

9 February 2026 10	Albirex Niigata (S) (Japan)	2–1	(Singapore) Hougang United	Jurong East
	Shingo Nakano 13'; Ryang Hyon-ju 43'; Hassan Sunny (yellow card) 90'	Report	Jaushua Sotirio 51' (yellow card) 90'; Huzaifah Aziz (yellow card) 68'; Victor Blasco (yellow card) 90+3'	Stadium: Jurong East Stadium; Referee: Thawfeek Ahamad; Man of the Match: (Japan) Shingo Nakano

14 February 2026 11	BG Tampines Rovers (Singapore)	2–1	(Japan) Albirex Niigata (S)	Tampines
	Hide Higashikawa 29', 45+1'; Jacob Mahler (yellow card) 36'	Report	Shingo Nakano 76' (yellow card) 27'	Stadium: Our Tampines Hub; Referee: Mazlan Pagira; Man of the Match: (Japan) Hide Higashikawa

21 February 2026 13	Young Lions (Singapore)	0–2	(Japan) Albirex Niigata (S)	Jalan Besar
	Joilson Lucas (yellow card) 58'; Andy Reefqy (yellow card) 74'	Report	Shingo Nakano 23', 63'; Naoki Yoshioka (yellow card) 72'; Syed Firdaus (yellow card) 80'	Stadium: Jalan Besar Stadium; Referee: Hilmi Fuad; Man of the Match: (Japan) Shingo Nakano

28 February 2026 12	Albirex Niigata (S) (Japan)	3–3	(Singapore) Lion City Sailors	Jurong East
	Ryang Hyon-ju 1'; Hariss Harun 14' (o.g.); Komei Iida 66'; Zulqarnaen Suzliman (yellow card) 53'	Report	Anderson Lopes 39' (pen.); Tsiy-William Ndenge 54'; Ivan Sušak 90+7'; Hariss Harun (yellow card) 27'; Hami Syahin (yellow card) 33'; Diogo Costa (yellow card) 89'	Stadium: Jurong East Stadium; Referee: Syarqawi Buhari; Man of the Match: (North Korea) Ryang Hyon-ju

6 March 2026 14	Tanjong Pagar United (Singapore)	0–2	(Japan) Albirex Niigata (S)	Jurong East
	Junior Djile (yellow card) 13'; Emilio Estevez (yellow card) 85'; Faizal Roslan (yellow card) 90+1'	Report	Abdul Rasaq 22'; Ryang Hyon-ju 35'; Shingo Nakano (yellow card) 48'; Syed Firdaus (yellow card) 55'	Stadium: Jurong East Stadium; Referee: Ahmad A'Qashah; Man of the Match: (North Korea) Ryang Hyon-ju

15 March 2026 15	Geylang International (Singapore)	1–0	(Japan) Albirex Niigata (S)	Tampines
	Shodai Yokoyama 73'; Shakir Hamzah (yellow card) 32'; Joshua Pereira (yellow card) 34'; Nazrul Nazari (yellow card) 90'	Report	Nicky Melvin Singh (yellow card) 90+2'; Naoki Yoshioka (yellow card) 90+6'	Stadium: Our Tampines Hub; Referee: Taufik Thana; Man of the Match: (North Korea) Ryang Hyon-ju

4 April 2026 16	Albirex Niigata (S) (Japan)	3–2	(Singapore) BG Tampines Rovers	Jurong East
	Ryang Hyon-ju 39' (pen.); Shingo Nakano 61'; Abdul Rasaq 86'; Kim Tae-uk (yellow card) 52'	Report	Trent Buhagiar 4'; Hide Higashikawa 7'; Shah Shahiran (yellow card) 90+5'	Stadium: Jurong East Stadium; Referee: Hilmi Fuad; Man of the Match: (Singapore) (Nigeria) Abdul Rasaq

13 April 2026 17	Balestier Khalsa (Singapore)	2–1	(Japan) Albirex Niigata (S)	Bishan
	Bogdan Mandić 33'; Naoki Yoshioka 90+4' (o.g.); Mario Subarić (yellow card) 53'; Madhu Mohana (yellow card) 80'	Report	Abdul Rasaq 36'	Stadium: Bishan Stadium; Referee: Jansen Foo; Man of the Match: (Serbia) Bogdan Mandić

18 April 2026 18	Hougang United (Singapore)	0–4	(Japan) Albirex Niigata (S)	Bishan
	Saifullah Akbar (yellow card) 16'; Jaushua Sotirio (yellow card) 58'; Victor Blasco (yellow card) 76'	Report	Shingo Nakano 33', 55'; Ryang Hyon-ju 56', 60'; Komei Iida (yellow card) 29'; Zulqarnaen Suzliman (yellow card) 68'	Stadium: Bishan Stadium; Referee: Khairul Amri; Man of the Match: (Japan) Shingo Nakano

25 April 2026 19	Albirex Niigata (S) (Japan)	4–0	(Singapore) Tanjong Pagar United	Jurong East
	Shingo Nakano 7', 10', 90'; Kim Tae-uk 27'	Report	Raihan Rahman (yellow card) 19'	Stadium: Jurong East Stadium; Referee: Oswind Suriya; Man of the Match: (Japan) Shingo Nakano

16 May 2026 20 (Rescheduled)	Albirex Niigata (S) (Japan)	3–0	(Singapore) Young Lions	Jurong East
	Zulqarnaen Suzliman 5'; Ryang Hyon-ju 30'; Shingo Nakano 66'; Haziq Kamarudin (yellow card) 33'; Nicky Melvin Singh (yellow card) 90+2'; Komei Iida (yellow card) 90+3'		Iryan Fandi (yellow card) 11'; Marcus Mosses (yellow card) 28'; Abner Vinicius (yellow card) 45+1'	Stadium: Jurong East Stadium; Referee: Ahmad A'Qashah

10 May 2026 21	Lion City Sailors (Singapore)	0–2	(Japan) Albirex Niigata (S)	Jalan Besar
	Nur Adam (yellow card) 85'; Toni Datković (red card) 90+6'		Shingo Nakano 49'; Toni Datković 52' (o.g.)	Stadium: Jalan Besar Stadium; Referee: Mazlan Pariga

Pos	Team	Pld	W	D	L	GF	GA	GD	Pts	Qualification or relegation
1	Lion City Sailors (C)	21	16	3	2	70	14	+56	51	Qualification for Champions League Two group stage (Note: Since the winners of the 2025–26 Singapore Cup, Lion City Sailors, qualified for the Champions League Two by league position, the spot reserved for the Singapore Cup winners will pass to the runners-up of the league.)
2	BG Tampines Rovers	21	15	4	2	58	21	+37	49	Qualification for Champions League Two group stage
3	Albirex Niigata (S)	21	15	2	4	47	19	+28	47	
4	Balestier Khalsa	21	11	2	8	44	46	−2	35	
5	Geylang International	21	7	3	11	29	42	−13	24	
6	Hougang United	21	7	0	14	24	41	−17	21	
7	Young Lions (Note: Young Lions cannot qualify for AFC competitions.)	21	2	3	16	15	58	−43	9	
8	Tanjong Pagar United	21	2	1	18	17	63	−46	7	

Updated to match(es) played on 18 May 2026. Source: Singapore Premier League
Rules for classification: 1) points; 2) goal difference; 3) number of goals scored; 4) number of wins
(C) Champions

=== Singapore Cup ===
==== Round 1 ====
1 November 2025 Rd 1 Match 1	Geylang International (Singapore)	0–3	(Japan) Albirex Niigata (S)	Tampines
	Nikola Ignjatovic (yellow card) 20'; Shakir Hamzah (red card) 23'		Shingo Nakano 26' (pen.), 83', 90+9' (yellow card) 89'; Sim Jun Yen (yellow card) 17'	Stadium: Our Tampines Hub; Referee: Jansen Foo; Man of the Match: (Japan) Shingo Nakano

6 November 2025 Rd 1 Match 2	Albirex Niigata (S) (Japan)	3–2	(Singapore) Balestier Khalsa	Jurong East
	Takumi Yokohata 22'; Kim Tae-uk 90+4'; Nicky Melvin Singh 90+8'		Tin Matić 59' (pen.); Jakov Katuša 74'; Fudhil I’yadh (yellow card) 40'; Masahiro Sugita (yellow card) 68'	Stadium: Jurong East Stadium; Referee: Syarqawi Buhari; Man of the Match: (Singapore) (Philippines) Nicky Melvin Singh

23 November 2025 Rd 1 Match 3	Albirex Niigata (S) (Japan)	1–0	(Singapore) Tanjong Pagar United	Jurong East
	Katsuyuki Ishibashi 55'		Youssef Ezzejjari (yellow card) 61'	Stadium: Jurong East Stadium; Referee: Zulfiqar Mustaffa; Man of the Match: (Japan) Katsuyuki Ishibashi

29 November 2025 Rd 1 Match 4	Hougang United (Singapore)	1–1	(Japan) Albirex Niigata (S)	Tampines
	Parinya Nusong 20'; Jordan Vestering (yellow card) 37'		Shingo Nakano 64'; Takumi Yokohata (yellow card) 5'	Stadium: Our Tampines Hub; Referee: Farhan Mohd; Man of the Match: (Singapore) Zharfan Rohaizad

==== Semi Final ====
14 December 2025 Semi Final Leg 1	Albirex Niigata (S) (Japan)	0–4	(Singapore) BG Tampines Rovers	Jurong East
	Haziq Kamarudin (yellow card) 60'; Takumi Yokohata (yellow card) 71'		Hide Higashikawa 56'; Joel Chew 76'; Trent Buhagiar 85'; Tallo Ngao 90+3'; Amirul Adli (yellow card) 45+3'	Stadium: Jurong East Stadium; Referee: Farhan Mohd; Man of the Match: (Japan) Hide Higashikawa

20 December 2025 Semi Final Leg 2	BG Tampines Rovers (Singapore)	1–3 (5–3 agg.)	(Japan) Albirex Niigata (S)	Tampines
	Seiga Sumi 55'; Amirul Adli (yellow card) 71'		Nozomi Ozawa 18'; Shingo Nakano 43' (yellow card) 78'; Kim Tae-uk (yellow card) 27'	Stadium: Our Tampines Hub; Referee: Clarence Leow; Man of the Match: (Japan) Nozomi Ozawa

Tampines Rovers won 5–3 on aggregate.

== Competition (SPL2) ==
Win Draw Loss

22 December 2025 1 (Rescheduled)	Albirex Niigata (S) (Japan)	0–1	(Singapore) BG Tampines Rovers	Jurong East
	Liska Iskandar (yellow card) 75'; Delwinder Singh (yellow card) 90'; Jaden Heng (yellow card) 90+5'		Witthawat Phraothaisong 5' (yellow card) 78'; Matthias Koesno (yellow card) 90+5'; Kegan Phant (yellow card) 90+5'	Stadium: Jurong East Stadium; Referee: Mazlan Pagira

24 September 2025 2 (Rescheduled)	Albirex Niigata (S) (Japan)	4–0	(Singapore) Young Lions	Jurong East
	Helmi Shahrol 45'; Jaden Heng 47'; Syukri Bashir 59'; Soshi Kadowaki 70'; Sim Jun Yen (yellow card) 18'		Ikram Mikhail Mustaqim (yellow card) 43'; Yazid Rais (yellow card) 74'	Stadium: Jurong East Stadium; Referee: Aldrick Lee

30 September 2025 3	Albirex Niigata (S) (Japan)	4–1	(Singapore) Geylang International	Jurong East
	Lee Dong-yeol 19', 31'; Jaden Heng 41', 58'; Dylan Pereira (yellow card) 55'; Danish Qayyum (yellow card) 74'; Aneeq Fairus (red card) 84'		Gareth Low 45' (yellow card) 65'; Shaquille Danish (yellow card) 82'	Stadium: Jurong East Stadium; Referee: Thawfeek Ahamad

7 October 2025 4	Balestier Khalsa (Singapore)	0–10	(Japan) Albirex Niigata (S)	Jurong East
	Nor Irfan (yellow card) 88'		Danish Qayyum 1'; Helmi Shahrol 14', 51' (yellow card) 43'; Syed Firdaus 28', 53'; Amy Recha 54', 67' (pen.), 69'; Liska Iskandar 59'; Soshi Kadowaki 83'; Nicky Melvin Singh (yellow card) 85'	Stadium: Jurong East Stadium; Referee: Clarence Leow

13 October 2025 5	Albirex Niigata (S) (Japan)	3–0	(Singapore) Hougang United	Jurong East
	Nicky Melvin Singh 67', 71'; Sim Jun Yen 90' (yellow card) 88'		Syady Sufwan (yellow card) 45+2'; Adam Ali (yellow card) 48'	Stadium: Jurong East Stadium; Referee: Taufik Thana

29 October 2025 6	Lion City Sailors (Singapore)	0–2	(Japan) Albirex Niigata (S)	Bishan
	Akmal Azman (yellow card) 90'		Aneeq Fairus 14'; Soshi Kadowaki 87'	Stadium: Bishan Stadium; Referee: Ahmad A'Qashah

10 November 2025 7	Tanjong Pagar United (Singapore)	0–3	(Japan) Albirex Niigata (S)	Jurong East
			Sim Jun Yen 75'; Jaden Heng 83'; Helmi Shahrol 90'	Stadium: Jurong East Stadium; Referee: Taufik Thana

18 November 2025 8	BG Tampines Rovers (Singapore)	2–2	(Japan) Albirex Niigata (S)	Jurong East
	Witthawat Phraothaisong 26'; Zikos Vasileios Chua 64' (yellow card) 71'; Matthias Koesno (yellow card) 89'		Amy Recha 45'; Syukri Bashir 87'; Aqil Zafri (yellow card) 25'; Khaalish Aaqil (yellow card) 41'; Liska Iskandar (yellow card) 90'	Stadium: Jurong East Stadium; Referee: Noor Adzdzeeq

3 December 2025 9	Albirex Niigata (S) (Japan)	2–0	(Singapore) Tanjong Pagar United	Jurong East
	Helmi Shahrol 46'; Ren Nishimura 73'; Aqil Zafri (yellow card) 58'; Aneeq Fairus (yellow card) 61'; Syed Firdaus Hassan (yellow card) 68'		Danish Haqimi (yellow card) 59'	Stadium: Jurong East Stadium; Referee: Oswind Suriya

16 December 2025 10	Geylang International (Singapore)	1–0	(Japan) Albirex Niigata (S)	Jurong East
	Shuhei Hoshino 60'; Joshua Pereira (yellow card) 6'; Ryoya Taniguchi (yellow card) 73'		Jaden Heng (yellow card) 32'; Syukri Bashir (yellow card) 44'; Aqil Zafri (yellow card) 50'	Stadium: Jurong East Stadium; Referee: Khairul Amri

6 January 2026 11	Albirex Niigata (S) (Japan)	2–0	(Singapore) Balestier Khalsa	Jurong East
	Ren Nishimura 26'; Shakthi Vinayagavijayan 90'; Komei Iida (yellow card) 50'		Zamani Zamri (yellow card) 40'; Fudhil I'yadh (yellow card) 86'; Ifat Sha'aban (yellow card) 90'	Stadium: Jurong East Stadium; Referee: Noor Adzdzeeq

14 January 2026 12	Hougang United (Singapore)	5–2	(Japan) Albirex Niigata (S)	Jurong East
	Jaushua Sotirio 10'; Washington Jaramillo 57', 62'; Farhan Zulkifli 73'; Settawut Wongsai 83'; Anders Aplin (yellow card) 28'; Jordan Vestering (yellow card) 66'		Ryaan Sanizal 50' (o.g.); Liska Iskandar 90'; Soshi Kadowaki (yellow card) 22'; Jaden Heng (yellow card) 61'	Stadium: Jurong East Stadium; Referee: Sahmadi Nawawi

21 January 2026 13	Albirex Niigata (S) (Japan)	2–1	(Singapore) Lion City Sailors	Jurong East
	Ryang Hyon-ju 4'; Soshi Kadowaki 90+2'; Aqil Zafri (yellow card) 36'		Namsang Rai 74'; Yasir Nizamudin (yellow card) 41'	Stadium: Jurong East Stadium; Referee: Yazid Abdul Latiff

27 January 2026 14	Young Lions (Singapore)	4–1	(Japan) Albirex Niigata (S)	Jalan Besar
	Rauf Anaqi 24'; Nicolas Beninger 51'; Ajay Robson 60'; Lukyan Tan Ye Yi 80'; Loo Kai Sheng (yellow card) 56'		Ahmad Martin 67'; Khaalish Aaqil (yellow card) 33' (yellow-red card); Jaden Heng (yellow card) 62'; Danish Qayyum (yellow card) 76'	Stadium: Jalan Besar Stadium; Referee: Faris Abdul Rahman

2026 15 (Rescheduled)	Albirex Niigata (S) (Japan)	1–3	(Singapore) BG Tampines Rovers	Jurong East
	Hilmi Shahrol 74'; Syukri Bashir (yellow card) 32'; Danish Qayyum (yellow card) 43'; Aydin Zufayri (yellow card) 65'		Lim Zheng Wu 9'; Taufik Surpano 42'; Zikos Chua 68'; Iman Hakim (yellow card) 89'	Stadium: Jurong East Stadium; Referee: Hilmi Fuad

24 February 2026 16	Tanjong Pagar United (Singapore)	0–2	(Japan) Albirex Niigata (S)	Jurong East
	Aiqel Aliman (yellow card) 63'; Syahadat Masnawi (yellow card) 70'; Azim Akbar (yellow card) 75'		Helmi Shahrol 48'; Liska Iskandar 88' (yellow card) 90'; Nicky Melvin Singh (yellow card) 34'; Sim Jun Yen (yellow card) 38'; Daniel Martens (yellow card) 65'	Stadium: Jurong East Stadium; Referee: Thawfeek Ahamad

17 March 2026 17	Albirex Niigata (S) (Japan)	2–1	(Singapore) Geylang International	Jurong East
	Nicky Melvin Singh 32'; Sim Jun Yen 38'; Aneeq Fairus (yellow card) 62'; Soshi Kadowaki (yellow card) 79'; Jaden Heng (yellow card) 81'		Timothy Cheng 58'; Gareth Low (yellow card) 74'; Faisal Shahril (yellow card) 79'	Stadium: Jurong East Stadium; Referee: Mazlan Pagira

31 March 2026 18	Balestier Khalsa (Singapore)	0–1	(Japan) Albirex Niigata (S)	Bishan
	Syafi Hilman (yellow card) 60'		Soshi Kadowaki 75'; Aqil Zafri (yellow card) 35'; Jaden Heng (yellow card) 45'; Nicky Melvin Singh (yellow card) 52'; Syed Firdaus Hassan (yellow card) 53'	Stadium: Bishan Stadium; Referee: Faris Abdul Rahman

7 April 2026 19	Albirex Niigata (S) (Japan)	4–1	(Singapore) Hougang United	Jurong East
	Naoki Yoshioka 44'; Helmi Shahrol 72'; Syukri Bashir 75', 87'; Aqil Zafri (yellow card) 77'		Farhan Sahlan 77'; Syady Sufwan (yellow card) 74'; G. Jeeva (yellow card) 87'	Stadium: Jurong East Stadium; Referee: Khairul Amri

14 April 2026 20	Lion City Sailors (Singapore)	2–0	(Japan) Albirex Niigata (S)	Jurong East
	Aiman Zayani 16' (yellow card) 90+5'; Ahmad Danial 47' (pen.); Aaryan Fikri (yellow card) 60'; Adam Faisal (yellow card) 68'; Ikmal Hazlan (yellow card) 90'		Ren Nishimura (yellow card) 21'; Aqil Zafri (yellow card) 51'; Daniel Martens (yellow card) 83'	Stadium: Jurong East Stadium; Referee: Yazid Abdul Latiff

21 April 2026 21	Albirex Niigata (S) (Japan)	2–1	(Singapore) Young Lions	Jalan Besar
	Ren Nishimura 1' (yellow card) 50'; Helmi Shahrol 75'; Aqil Zafri (yellow card) 83'; Shakthi Vinayagavijayan (yellow card) 86'; Danish Qayyum (yellow card) 89'		Abner Vinicius 44' (pen.); Fairuz Fazli (yellow card) 17'; Muhammad Fadly (yellow card) 32'	Stadium: Jalan Besar Stadium; Referee: Mazlan Pagira

Pos	Team	Pld	W	D	L	GF	GA	GD	Pts	Qualification or relegation
1	Albirex Niigata (S) II	21	14	1	6	50	23	+27	43	Inaugural Champion
2	Young Lions B	21	13	1	7	52	31	+21	40	
3	BG Tampines Rovers II	21	12	2	7	46	30	+16	38	
4	Geylang International II	21	9	4	8	36	38	−2	31	
5	Tanjong Pagar United II	21	9	3	9	34	43	−9	30	
6	Lion City Sailors II	21	7	2	12	35	41	−6	23	
7	Hougang United II	21	5	4	12	28	43	−15	19	
8	Balestier Khalsa II	21	5	3	13	25	57	−32	18	

First match(es) will be played: 7 May 2026. Source: Singapore Premier League
Rules for classification: 1) points; 2) goal difference; 3) number of goals scored; 4) number of wins
