= 2024–25 Albirex Niigata Singapore FC season =

Albirex Niigata (S)
2024–25 season
- Chairman: Daisuke Korenaga
- Head coach: (Japan) Kazuaki Yoshinaga (until 13 July 2024) (Japan) Keiji Shigetomi
- Stadium: Jurong East Stadium
- Premier League: 6th
- Singapore Cup: Group Stage
Home colours	Away colours

The 2024–25 season was Albirex Niigata Singapore's 21st consecutive season in the top flight of Singapore football and in the Singapore Premier League, having joined the league in 2004. Along with the 2024–25 Singapore Premier League, the club also competed in the Singapore Cup.

Albirex Niigata Singapore transitioned to be a fully local club from this season onwards, requiring them to abide by the same competition rules as local teams, including the foreign player quota.

== Season review ==
=== Off-season ===
The 2024–25 Singapore Premier League season will be the first season to be played having a two-year schedule where Albirex Niigata Singapore participated in the 2024 interim pre-season tournament from 23 February until 20 April. The interim pre-season tournament ensure that the players are adequately prepared for an extended new season that will span nearly 12 months. On 30 March, Albirex Niigata Singapore travelled to Ipoh to face Malaysia Super League club, Perak in a pre-season friendly which resulted in a 3–1 loss at the Perak Stadium where Arya Igami Tarhani scored the only goal for the club. On 16 April, they faced another Malaysia Premier League club, Sri Pahang at the Jalan Besar Stadium in which The Swans lost 1–0 to the visitors.

=== Transfer ===
Heading into the new season, the team faced a void left by the retirement of veteran ex-Japan International Tadanari Lee. To shore up their title defense, they brought in seasoned campaigner Yojiro Takahagi, who boasts 3 caps for the Japan national team, and promising youngster Stevia Egbus Mikuni, a former Japan youth international.

They also welcomed back some players, including Singapore nationals Daniel Goh and Gareth Low, as well as Shuhei Hoshino.

In addition, current Singapore internationals, Idraki Adnan & Ho Wai Loon join former Singapore youth internationals, Dylan Pereira, Arshad Shamim, Haziq Kamarudin and Syukri Bashir in the ranks.

== Squad ==
=== Singapore Premier League ===
As of 25 Dec 2023

Squad no.	Name	Nationality	Date of birth (age)	Previous club	Contract start	Contract end
Goalkeepers
1	Dylan Pereira	(Singapore)	31 July 2000 (age 26)	(Singapore) Police SA	2024	2025
18	Hassan Sunny	(Singapore)	2 April 1984 (age 42)	(Singapore) Lion City Sailors	2023	2026
25	Zainol Gulam	(Singapore)	4 February 1992 (age 34)	(Singapore) Hougang United	2024	2025
Defenders
2	Junki Kenn Yoshimura	(Singapore) (Japan)	20 July 2004 (age 22)	(Singapore) Albirex Niigata (S) U21	2021	2025
4	Koki Kawachi	(Japan)	10 May 2000 (age 26)	(Japan) Chukyo University	2023	2025
22	Syahrul Sazali	(Singapore)	3 June 1998 (age 28)	(Singapore) Tampines Rovers	2025	2025
28	Gareth Low	(Singapore)	28 February 1997 (age 29)	(Singapore) Geylang International	2024	2025
31	Daniel Martens	(Singapore)	25 February 1999 (age 27)	(Singapore) Tanjong Pagar United	2024	2025
33	Nozomi Ozawa ^{FP U21}	(Japan)	16 February 2003 (age 23)	(Japan) Ryutsu Keizai University	2024	2025
41	Stevia Egbus Mikuni	(Japan) (Nigeria)	31 May 1998 (age 28)	(Japan) FC Gifu (J3)	2024	2025
Midfielders
5	Naoki Yoshioka	(Japan)	6 April 2002 (age 24)	(Japan) Osaka UHSS	2025	2025
10	Yohei Otake	(Japan)	2 May 1989 (age 37)	(Japan) V-Varen Nagasaki (J2)	2024	2025
14	Taiki Maeda ^{FP U21}	(Japan)	31 October 2005 (age 21)	(United States) Salt Lake Community College (Amateur)	2025	2025
15	Syed Firdaus Hassan	(Singapore)	30 May 1998 (age 28)	(Singapore) Tampines Rovers	2024	2025
20	Arshad Shamim	(Singapore)	9 December 1999 (age 26)	(Singapore) Geylang International	2024	2025
24	Ho Wai Loon	(Singapore)	20 August 1993 (age 33)	(Singapore) Balestier Khalsa	2024	2025
42	Haziq Kamarudin	(Singapore)	6 March 2001 (age 25)	(Singapore) Young Lions	2024	2025
Forwards
7	Amy Recha	(Singapore) (Indonesia)	13 May 1992 (age 34)	(Singapore) Hougang United	2024	2025
9	Shuhei Hoshino	(Japan)	19 December 1995 (age 30)	(Singapore) Balestier Khalsa	2024	2025
11	Daniel Goh	(Singapore)	13 August 1999 (age 27)	(Singapore) Balestier Khalsa	2024	2025
19	Syukri Bashir	(Singapore)	11 April 1998 (age 28)	(Singapore) Tanjong Pagar United	2024	2025
58	Shingo Nakano ^{FP U21}	(Japan)	26 December 2004 (age 21)	(United States) El Camino College (Amateur)	2024	2025
Players who left club for NS during season
22	Nicky Melvin Singh	(Singapore) (Philippines)	13 June 2002 (age 24)	(Singapore) Tampines Rovers U19	2021	2023
27	Shakthi Vinayagavijayan	(Singapore)	28 May 2003 (age 23)	(Japan) Albirex Niigata (S) U19	2022	2023
54	Kenji Austin	(Singapore) (Japan)	24 February 2004 (age 22)	(Singapore) Active SG	2020	2025
56	Firman Nabil	(Singapore)	27 March 2005 (age 21)	(Singapore) Mattar Sailors (SFL1)	2023	2025
	Ashvin Vela	(Singapore)	3 March 2005 (age 21)	(Singapore) Hougang United U21	2024	2026
26	Jarrel Ong Jia Wei	(Singapore) (China)	26 October 2002 (age 24)	(Singapore) Hougang United U21	2023	2026
Players who left club on loan during season
6	Arya Igami Tarhani ^{FP U21}	(Japan) (Iran)	24 February 2003 (age 23)	(Spain) CF Badalona (S5)	2024	2025
Players who left club during season
8	Yojiro Takahagi	(Japan)	2 August 1986 (age 40)	(Japan) Tochigi SC (J2)	2024	2025
13	Idraki Adnan	(Singapore)	13 March 1999 (age 27)	(Singapore) Hougang United	2024	2025
16	Ryhan Stewart	(Singapore) (Wales)	15 February 2000 (age 26)	(Thailand) BG Pathum United F.C. (T1)	2024	2026
74	Kai Yamamoto ^{FP U21}	(United States) (Japan) (Singapore)	21 June 2005 (age 21)	(United States) Carnegie Mellon University (Amateur)	2024	2025

Remarks:
^{FP U21} These players are registered as U21 foreign players.

== Coaching staff ==
First team

Position	Name
Technical director	(Japan) Kazuaki Yoshinaga
Team manager (men)	(Singapore) Dominic Wong
Head coach (men)	(Japan) Keiji Shigetomi (Japan) Kazuaki Yoshinaga (until 13 July 2024)
Assistant coach (men)	(Singapore) Jaswinder Singh (Spain) Marcal Trulls
Goalkeeper coach (men)	(Singapore) Fadhil Salim
Fitness coach (men)	(Japan) Masayuki Kato
Sports trainer	(Singapore) Kyler Wong Yiming
Physiotherapist	(Singapore) Karen Koh (Singapore) Alison Soh
Analyst	(Singapore) Shaun Tan
Kitman	(Singapore) Roy Krishnan (Singapore) Muhammad Taufik
Interpreter	(Japan) Masayuki Kato

Academy

Position	Name
Head of youth	(Spain) Marcal Trulls
Under-21 head coach	(Singapore) Jaswinder Singh
Under-17 head coach	(Spain) Marcal Trulls
Under-15 head coach	(Japan) Masayuki Kato
Under-21 asst coach	(Singapore) Abdul Jamal (Singapore) Toi
Under-17 asst coach	(Japan) Keiji Shigetomi
Under-15 asst coach	(Singapore) Tyrus Soo (Singapore) Nurhalis Azmi
Goalkeeper coach (under-21)	(Singapore) Wan Shaifulrezza Bin Shes
Goalkeeper coach (under-17 & under-15)	(Singapore) Hyrulnizam Juma'at
Under-21 fitness coach	(Singapore) Sufian
Under-21 trainer	(Singapore) Xin Yu

== Transfer ==
=== In ===
Preseason

Position	Player	Transferred from	Team	Fee
GK	(Singapore) Dylan Pereira	(Singapore) Police SA	First team	Free
GK	(Singapore) Zainol Gulam	(Singapore) Hougang United	First team	Free
DF	(Japan) (Nigeria) SteviaEgbus Mikuni	(Japan) FC Gifu (J3)	First team	Free
DF	(Singapore) Daniel Martens	Free Agent	First team	N.A.
DF	(Singapore) Aidil Johari	(Singapore) Balestier Khalsa	U21	Free
DF	(Singapore) Gabriel Goh	(Singapore) Lion City Sailors U21	U21	Free
DF	(Singapore) Ahmad Martin Roslan	Singapore Sports School	U21	Free
DF	(Singapore) Harriz Danial	(Singapore) Hougang United U21	U21	Free
MF	(Singapore) Ho Wai Loon	(Singapore) Balestier Khalsa	First team	Free
MF	(Japan) (Iran) Arya Igami Tarhani	(Spain) CF Badalona (S5)	First team	Free
MF	(Japan) Yohei Otake	(Japan) V-Varen Nagasaki (J2)	First team	Free
MF	(Japan) Yojiro Takahagi	(Japan) Tochigi SC (J2)	First team	Free
MF	(Singapore) Arshad Shamim	(Singapore) Lion City Sailors	First team	Free
MF	(Singapore) Gareth Low	(Singapore) Geylang International	First team	Free
MF	(Singapore) Syafi’ie Redzuan	(Singapore) Young Lions	First team	Free
MF	(Singapore) Haziq Kamarudin	(Singapore) Young Lions	First team	Free
MF	(Singapore) Idraki Adnan	(Singapore) Hougang United	First team	Free
MF	(Singapore) Ashvin Vela	(Singapore) Hougang United U21	U21	Free
MF	(Singapore) Farhan Sahlan	(Singapore) Balestier Khalsa U21	U21	Free
FW	(Singapore) Amy Recha	(Singapore) Hougang United	First team	Free
FW	(Singapore) Daniel Goh	(Singapore) Balestier Khalsa	First team	Free
FW	(Japan) Shuhei Hoshino	(Singapore) Balestier Khalsa	First team	Free
FW	(Singapore) Syukri Bashir	(Singapore) Tanjong Pagar United	First team	Free
FW	(Japan) Shingo Nakano	(United States) El Camino college	First team	Free
FW	(Singapore) Rauf Anaqi	Singapore Sports School	U21	Free

Mid-season

Position	Player	Transferred from	Team	Fee
DF	(Japan) Nozomi Ozawa	(Japan) Ryutsu Keizai University	First team	Free
DF	(Singapore) (Wales) Ryhan Stewart	(Thailand) BG Pathum United F.C.	First Team	Free; 1.5 years contract from Sept 2024 till May 2026
MF	(Japan) Naoki Yoshioka	(Japan) Osaka UHSS	First Team	Free
MF	(Singapore) Jaden Heng	(Singapore) ActiveSG U17	U21	Free
FW	(Japan) Taiki Maeda	(United States) Salt Lake Community College	First team	Free

=== Loan in ===
Preseason

Position	Player	Transferred from	Team	Terms
GK	(Japan) (United States) (Singapore) Kai Yamamoto	(United States) Carnegie Mellon University	First team	Loan till Nov 2024
MF	(Singapore) Syed Firdaus Hassan	(Singapore) Tampines Rovers	First team	Season-long loan till May 2025

Mid-season

Position	Player	Transferred from	Team	Terms
DF	(Singapore) Syahrul Sazali	(Singapore) Tampines Rovers	First team	Season-long loan till May 2025

=== Out ===
Preseason

Position	Player	Transferred to	Team	Fee
GK	(Singapore) Hyrulnizam Juma'at	Retired	First team	N/A
GK	(Japan) Yoshihiko Kobayashi	Retired	First team	Free
DF	(Japan) Shunsaku Kishimoto	(Japan) Reilac Shiga FC (J4)	First team	Free
DF	(Japan) Sho Fuwa	(Japan) Basara Hyogo (J5)	First team	Free
DF	(Japan) Ryo Takahashi	(Australia) Langwarrin SC (A3)	First team	Free
DF	(Japan) Keito Hariya	(Singapore) Geylang International	First team	Free
DF	(Singapore) Gabriel Goh	(Singapore) Hougang United U21	U21	Free
DF	(Singapore) Irfan Azahar	(Singapore)	U21	Free
DF	(Singapore) Adam Norkhalis	(Singapore) Jungfrau Punggol U23 (IWL)	U21	Free
DF	(Singapore) Firwen Anaqin	(Singapore)	U21	Free
DF	(Singapore) Oswald Tan Zi Sheng	(Singapore) Tengah FC	U21	Free
DF	(Singapore) Wong Jun Kai	(Singapore)	U21	Free
DF	(Singapore) Raihan Ramlee	(Singapore)	U21	Free
DF	(Singapore) Mustaqim Mulyadi Ihsan	(Singapore)	U21	Free
DF	(Singapore) Daniyal Lynn Rasor	(Singapore)	U21	Free
MF	(Japan) Asahi Yokokawa	(Australia) Heidelberg United (A2)	First team	Free
MF	(Japan) Shuto Komaki	(Philippines) Kaya–Iloilo (P1)	First team	Free
MF	(Japan) Kaisei Ogawa	(Singapore) Young Lions	First team	Free
MF	(Japan) Riku Fukashiro	(Singapore) Balestier Khalsa	First team	Free
MF	(Japan) Masaya Watanabe	(Philippines) Stallion Laguna	First team	Free
MF	(Japan) Shodai Yokoyama	(Singapore) Hougang United	First team	Free
MF	(Singapore) Danish Adam Abdullah	(Singapore) Geylang International U21	U21	Free
MF	(Singapore) Ukaishah Ilhan	(Japan) Hougang United U21	U21	Free
MF	(Singapore) Asraf Rilwan	(Singapore)	U21	Free
MF	(Singapore) Rayson Goh Hong Yu	(Singapore)	U21	Free
MF	(Japan) Okada Ryusei	(Singapore)	U21	Free
FW	(Japan) Seia Kunori	(Singapore) BG Tampines Rovers	First team	Free
FW	(Japan) Tadanari Lee	Retired	First team	N/A
FW	(Japan) Keito Komatsu	Retired	First team	N/A
FW	(Singapore) Zamani Zamri	(Singapore) Hougang United	First team	Free
FW	(Singapore) Irsyad Azarudin	(Singapore) South Avenue FC (SFL2)	U21	Free
FW	(Singapore) Firman Shah Roslani	(Singapore)	U21	Free

Mid-season

Position	Player	Transferred to	Team	Fee
DF	(Singapore) (Wales) Ryhan Stewart	(Lithuania) FK Riteriai	First Team	Free; 2 years contract from Mar 2025 till Dec 2026
MF	(Japan) Yojiro Takahagi	Retired	First team	N/A
MF	(Singapore) Idraki Adnan	(Singapore)	First team	Free
MF	(Singapore) Syafi’ie Redzuan	(Singapore) SAFSA	First team	NS till June 2026

=== Loan return (out) ===
Mid-season

Position	Player	Transferred to	Team	Fee
GK	(Japan) (United States) (Singapore) Kai Yamamoto	(United States) Carnegie Mellon University	First team	End of loan

=== Loan out ===
Preseason

Position	Player	Transferred to	Terms	Ref
MF	(Singapore) (Philippines) Nicky Melvin Singh	(Singapore) SAFSA	First team	NS till July 2025
MF	(Singapore) Shakthi Vinayagavijayan	(Singapore) SAFSA	First team	NS till December 2025
FW	(Singapore) Darwisy Hanis	(Singapore) Police SA	First team	NS till January 2026
GK	(Singapore) Firman Nabil	(Singapore) Young Lions	First team	Season-long loan
MF	(Singapore) Jarrel Ong Jia Wei	(Singapore) SAFSA	First team	NS till June 2026

Mid-season

Position	Player	Transferred to	Team	Terms
MF	(Japan) (Iran) Arya Igami Tarhani	(Singapore) Tampines Rovers	First team	Free
DF	(Singapore) (Japan) Kenji Austin	(Singapore) SAFSA	First team	NS till March 2027

=== Retained / Extension / Promoted ===
Position	Player	Terms
DF	(Japan) Koki Kawachi	1.5 year contract till June 2025
DF	(Singapore) (Japan) Kenji Austin	1.5 year contract till June 2025 (promoted)
DF	(Singapore) (Japan) Junki Kenn Yoshimura	1.5 year contract till June 2025 (promoted)
MF	(Singapore) Hilman Norhisam	2.5 years contract till June 2025
GK	(Singapore) Hassan Sunny	2 years contract till 2026

== Friendly ==
=== Pre-season ===
Win Draw Loss

2024 SPL Interim Tournament – 23 Feb to 21 Apr

23 February 2024 1	Albirex Niigata (S) (Japan)	3–7	(Singapore) Balestier Khalsa	Jalan Besar
	Yohei Otake 42'; Shuhei Hoshino 58'; Arya Igami Tarhani 67'		Riku Fukashiro 1'; Ismail Sassi 4', 40'; Harith Kanadi 48'; Kodai Tanaka 56'; Alen Kozar 71', 80'	Stadium: Jalan Besar Stadium; Referee: Ahmad A'qashah

3 March 2024 2	Albirex Niigata (S) (Japan)	3–1	(Singapore) Lion City Sailors	Jalan Besar
	Haziq Kamarudin 6'; Shuhei Hoshino 12'; Koki Kawachi 79'		Nathan Mao 52' (pen.)	Stadium: Jalan Besar Stadium

9 March 2024 3	Albirex Niigata (S) (Japan)	1–7	(Singapore) Tampines Rovers	Jalan Besar
	Arya Igami Tarhani 64'		Faris Ramli 8'; Boris Kopitović 20'; Miloš Zlatković 45+2'; Shah Shahiran 55'; Irfan Najeeb 74'; Saifullah Akbar 82'; Caelan Cheong 85'	Stadium: Jalan Besar Stadium

13 April 2024 4	Albirex Niigata (S) (Japan)	0–4	(Singapore) Tanjong Pagar United	Jalan Besar
			Tomoki Wada 12'; Anaqi Ismit 48'; Rezza Rezky 64'; Fariz Fadilla Lubis 88'	Stadium: Jalan Besar Stadium

20 April 2024 5	Albirex Niigata (S) (Japan)	3–0	(Singapore) Geylang International	Jalan Besar
	Arya Igami Tarhani 23', 43'; Yohei Otake 66'			Stadium: Jalan Besar Stadium

Others

30 March 2024	Perak (Malaysia)	3–1	(Japan) Albirex Niigata (S)	Ipoh
	Adilet Kanybekov 6'; Adli Ahamad 54'; Luka Milunović 73' (pen.)		Arya Igami Tarhani 46'	Stadium: Perak Stadium

16 April 2024	Albirex Niigata (S) (Japan)	0–1	(Malaysia) Sri Pahang	Jalan Besar
			Aleksandar Cvetković	Stadium: Jalan Besar Stadium

Match was abandoned after 35mins due to incremental weather.

26 April 2024	Kuching City (Malaysia)	v	(Singapore) Albirex Niigata (S)	Johor
				Stadium: Pasir Gudang Stadium

28 June 2024	JDT III (Malaysia)	4–1	(Singapore) Albirex Niigata (S)	Jurong East
				Stadium: Jurong East Stadium

=== Mid-season ===
8 September 2024	Johor Darul Ta'zim II (Malaysia)	5–3	(Singapore) Albirex Niigata (S)	Johor
	Daryl Sham 62', 75'; Danish Zahir 64'; Ramadhan Saifullah 85'; Danish Syamer 87'		Arya Igami 16'; Yohei Otake 32'; Shingo Nakano 51'	Stadium: Pasir Gudang Corporation Stadium

12 October 2024	Negeri Sembilan FC (Malaysia)	1–0	(Singapore) Albirex Niigata (S)	Paroi
	Takumi Sasaki 60'			Stadium: Kuala Pilah Stadium

10 January 2025	BG Tampines Rovers (Singapore)	1–1	(Singapore) Albirex Niigata (S)	Jurong East
				Stadium: Jurong East Stadium

20 March 2025 1	Johor Darul Ta'zim (Malaysia)	4–1	(Singapore) Albirex Niigata (S)	Johor
	Jonathan Viera 25'; Samuel Castillejo 57'; Alvaro Gonzalez 75'; Oscar Arribas 89'		Shingo Nakano 85'	Stadium: Sultan Ibrahim Stadium

== Team statistics ==
=== Appearances and goals ===
As at 25 May 2025

No.	Pos.	Player	SPL		Singapore Cup		Charity Shield		Total	
No.	Pos.	Player	Apps.	Goals	Apps.	Goals	Apps.	Goals	Apps.	Goals
1	GK	(Singapore) Dylan Pereira	0+1	0	1	0	0	0	2	0
2	DF	(Singapore) (Japan) Junki Kenn Yoshimura	26+2	1	4	0	0	0	32	1
4	DF	(Japan) Koki Kawachi	30	2	3	0	1	0	34	2
5	MF	(Japan) Naoki Yoshioka	11	0	3	0	0	0	14	0
7	FW	(Singapore) Amy Recha	3+8	2	0+1	0	0+1	0	13	2
9	FW	(Japan) Shuhei Hoshino	24	7	4	0	1	0	29	7
10	MF	(Japan) Yohei Otake	25	5	3	0	1	0	29	5
11	FW	(Singapore) Daniel Goh	13+11	5	1+3	1	1	0	29	6
14	MF	(Japan) Taiki Maeda	5	0	2	0	0	0	7	0
15	MF	(Singapore) Syed Firdaus Hassan	26+3	0	2+1	0	1	0	33	0
18	GK	(Singapore) Hassan Sunny	31	0	3	0	1	0	35	0
19	FW	(Singapore) Syukri Bashir	1+10	0	1	0	0	0	12	0
20	MF	(Singapore) Arshad Shamim	9+20	0	2+1	1	0	0	32	1
22	DF	(Singapore) Syahrul Sazali	3+3	0	1	0	0	0	7	0
24	MF	(Singapore) Ho Wai Loon	10+4	0	0	0	1	0	15	0
25	GK	(Singapore) Zainol Gulam	1+1	0	0	0	0	0	2	0
28	MF	(Singapore) Gareth Low	18+4	0	2	0	1	0	25	0
31	DF	(Singapore) Daniel Martens	2+4	0	0	0	0	0	3	0
33	DF	(Japan) Nozomi Ozawa	0	0	0	0	0	0	0	0
41	DF	(Japan) (Nigeria) SteviaEgbus Mikuni	31	1	4	0	1	0	36	1
42	MF	(Singapore) Haziq Kamarudin	17+6	1	2+1	0	0+1	0	27	1
53	MF	(Singapore) Hilman Norhisam	0+2	0	0	0	0	0	2	0
54	MF	(Singapore) (Japan) Kenji Austin	0+3	0	0+2	0	0	0	5	0
55	FW	(Singapore) Helmi Shahrol	0+1	0	0+1	0	0	0	2	0
58	FW	(Japan) Shingo Nakano	29	23	1+1	2	0	0	31	25
62	FW	(Singapore) Jaden Heng	0+1	0	1	0	0	0	2	0
77	DF	(Singapore) Sim Jun Yen	0+1	0	0+1	0	0	0	2	0
Players who have played this season but had left the club or on loan to other club
6	FW	(Japan) (Iran) Arya Igami Tarhani	14+2	4	0	0	1	0	16	4
8	MF	(Japan) Yojiro Takahagi	11+2	0	0	0	1	0	14	0
13	FW	(Singapore) Idraki Adnan	0+1	0	0	0	0	0	1	0
16	DF	(Singapore) (Wales) Ryhan Stewart	10	1	3	0	0	0	13	1
26	MF	(Singapore) Jarrel Ong Jia Wei	0	0	0	0	0	0	0	0
74	GK	(United States) (Japan) (Singapore) Kai Yamamoto	1	0	0	0	0	0	1	0

== Competitions ==
=== Overview ===
Results summary (SPL)

Overall								Home						Away					
Pld	W	D	L	GF	GA	GD	Pts	W	D	L	GF	GA	GD	W	D	L	GF	GA	GD
0	0	0	0	0	0	0	0	0	0	0	0	0	0	0	0	0	0	0	0

=== Community Shield ===
4 May 2024 Community Shield	Albirex Niigata (S) (Japan)	0–2	(Singapore) Lion City Sailors	Jalan Besar
	Shuhei Hoshino (yellow card) 40'; Gareth Low (yellow card) 82'		Shawal Anuar 42' (yellow card) 60'; Maxime Lestienne 82'; Aleksandar Ranković (yellow card) 52'	Stadium: Jalan Besar Stadium; Referee: Clarence Leow

=== Singapore Premier League ===
Win Draw Loss

12 May 2024 1	BG Tampines Rovers (Singapore)	3–1	(Japan) Albirex Niigata (S)	Jalan Besar
	Seia Kunori 62', 73'; Boris Kopitović 87'; Miloš Zlatković (yellow card) 28'		Daniel Goh 38'; Ho Wai Loon (yellow card) 48'; Koki Kawachi (yellow card) 61'; Yojiro Takahagi (yellow card) 78'	Stadium: Jalan Besar Stadium; Referee: Jansen Foo; Man of the Match: (Japan) Seia Kunori

18 May 2024 2	Albirex Niigata (S) (Japan)	1–0	(Singapore) Hougang United	Jurong East
	Shuhei Hoshino 7'; Daniel Goh (yellow card) 46'; Syed Firdaus Hassan (yellow card) 49'; Hassan Sunny (red card) 60'; Arya Igami Tarhani (yellow card) 90+6'		Hazzuwan Halim (yellow card) 71'	Stadium: Jurong East Stadium; Referee: Taufik Thana; Man of the Match: (Japan) (Nigeria) Stevia Egbus Mikuni

25 May 2024 3	Albirex Niigata (S) (Japan)	1–4	(Brunei) DPMM	Jurong East
	Yohei Otake 56' (yellow card) 34'		Julio Cruz 12'; Gabriel Gama 18'; Oliveira 21', 60'; Syafiq Safiuddin Abdul Shariff (yellow card) 29'	Stadium: Jurong East Stadium; Referee: Farhan Mohd; Man of the Match: (Portugal) Miguel Oliveira

15 June 2024 4	Young Lions (Singapore)	3–2	(Japan) Albirex Niigata (S)	Jalan Besar
	SteviaEgbus Mikuni 40' (o.g.); Itsuki Enomoto 79'; Andrew Aw 87'; Raoul Suhaimi (red card) 55'; Kieran Teo Jia Jun (yellow card) 67'; Aqil Yazid (yellow card) 74'		Shingo Nakano 28', 58'; Shuhei Hoshino (yellow card) 44'	Stadium: Jalan Besar Stadium; Referee: Syarqawi Buhari; Man of the Match: (Singapore) Azil Yazid

23 June 2024 5	Lion City Sailors (Singapore)	7–1	(Japan) Albirex Niigata (S)	Bishan
	Shawal Anuar 9'; Lennart Thy 31'; Bailey Wright 55'; Song Ui-young 60'; Bart Ramselaar 64', 83' (yellow card) 38'; Maxime Lestienne 68'		Shuhei Hoshino 21'	Stadium: Bishan Stadium; Referee: Andrea Verolino; Man of the Match: (Netherlands) Bart Ramselaar

6 July 2024 6	Albirex Niigata (S) (Japan)	0–6	(Singapore) Geylang International	Jurong East
	Yohei Otake (yellow card) 51'		Shakir Hamzah 20'; Iqbal Hussain 50'; Tomoyuki Doi 78', 84', 88' (pen.); Naqiuddin Eunos 82'; Vincent Bezecourt (yellow card) 35'	Stadium: Jurong East Stadium; Referee: Muhammad Taqi; Man of the Match: (Japan) Tomoyuki Doi

12 July 2024 7	Tanjong Pagar United (Singapore)	2–1	(Japan) Albirex Niigata (S)	Jurong East
	Salif Cissé 75' (penalty missed) 71; Faizal Roslan 86' (pen.); Stefan Paunovic (yellow card) 45+1'; Hafiz Osman (yellow card) 45+1'; Syed Akmal (red card) 50'		Shingo Nakano 16'; Gareth Low (yellow card) 67'; Hassan Sunny (yellow card) 84'	Stadium: Jurong East Stadium; Referee: Taufik Thana; Man of the Match: (France) (Mali) Salif Cissé

18 July 2024 8	Albirex Niigata (S) (Japan)	7–2	(Singapore) Balestier Khalsa	Jurong East
	Shingo Nakano 10', 61', 76'; Arya Igami Tarhani 17'; Daniel Goh 44', 65', 74'; Syed Firdaus Hassan (yellow card) 5'; SteviaEgbus Mikuni (yellow card) 58'		Kodai Tanaka 11'; Jordan Emaviwe 82'; Alen Kozar (yellow card) 73'; Tajeli Salamat (yellow card) 38'	Stadium: Jurong East Stadium; Referee: Syarqawi Buhari; Man of the Match: (Japan) Shingo Nakano

23 July 2024 9	Hougang United (Singapore)	1–0	(Japan) Albirex Niigata (S)	Jalan Besar
	Stjepan Plazonja 78'; Faris Hasić (yellow card) 32'		Ho Wai Loon (yellow card) 37'	Stadium: Jalan Besar Stadium; Referee: Ahmad A'Qashah; Man of the Match: (Croatia) Stjepan Plazonja

27 July 2024 10	Albirex Niigata (S) (Japan)	2–4	(Singapore) BG Tampines Rovers	Jurong East
	Arya Igami Tarhani 49'; Shingo Nakano 62'; Ho Wai Loon (yellow card) 51'		Seia Kunori 15'; Boris Kopitović 33' (pen.); Shuya Yamashita 53'; Yasir Hanapi 57'	Stadium: Jurong East Stadium; Referee: Andrea Verolino; Man of the Match: (Japan) Seia Kunori

4 August 2024 11	Albirex Niigata (S) (Japan)	2–1	(Singapore) Young Lions	Jurong East
	Shingo Nakano 2' (yellow card) 40'; Shuhei Hoshino 63'; Syed Firdaus Hassan (yellow card) 6'; Ho Wai Loon (yellow card) 44'; Daniel Goh (yellow card) 57'		SteviaEgbus Mikuni 55' (o.g.); Fathullah Rahmat (yellow card) 8'; Kieran Teo Jia Jun (yellow card) 15'; Kan Kobayashi (yellow card) 44'	Stadium: Jurong East Stadium; Referee: Farhan Mohd; Man of the Match: (Japan) Koki Kawachi

10 August 2024 12	DPMM (Brunei)	0–0	(Japan) Albirex Niigata (S)	Bandar Seri Begawan
	Hakeme Yazid Said (yellow card) 53'; Azwan Ali Rahman (yellow card) 84'			Stadium: Hassanal Bolkiah National Stadium; Referee: Andrea Verolino

25 August 2024 13	Albirex Niigata (S) (Japan)	3–1	(Singapore) Lion City Sailors	Jurong East
	Arya Igami Tarhani 10'; Shingo Nakano 81' (pen.), 88'; Ho Wai Loon (yellow card) 87'; Gareth Low (yellow card) 90+1'; Yojiro Takahagi (yellow card) 90+5'		Lennart Thy 74'	Stadium: Jurong East Stadium; Referee: Muhammad Taqi; Man of the Match: (Japan) Shingo Nakano

15 September 2024 14	Geylang International (Singapore)	5–1	(Japan) Albirex Niigata (S)	Jalan Besar
	Tomoyuki Doi 13', 22', 73'; Ryoya Tanigushi 55' (yellow card) 67'; Zikos Chua 84'; Shakir Hamzah (yellow card) 11'		Haziq Kamarudin 76'; Syed Firdaus Hassan (yellow card) 45+1'; Arshad Shamim (yellow card) 86'	Stadium: Jalan Besar Stadium; Referee: Jansen Foo; Man of the Match: (Japan) Tomoyuki Doi

20 September 2024 15	Albirex Niigata (S) (Japan)	4–1	(Singapore) Tanjong Pagar United	Jurong East
	Shingo Nakano 45+20', 68'; Shuhei Hoshino 58', 72'		Akram Azman 67'	Stadium: Jurong East Stadium; Referee: Syarqawi Buhari; Man of the Match: (Japan) Shuhei Hoshino

28 September 2024 16	Balestier Khalsa (Singapore)	2–3	(Japan) Albirex Niigata (S)	Bishan
	Riku Fukashiro 9'; Jordan Emaviwe 90+2'; Ismail Sassi (yellow card) 52' (yellow-red card) 58'		Shingo Nakano 5', 75'; Jordan Emaviwe 44' (o.g.); Ryhan Stewart (yellow card) 23'; Yohei Otake (yellow card) 53'; Daniel Goh (yellow card) 90+5'	Stadium: Bishan Stadium; Referee: Farhan Mohd; Man of the Match: (Japan) Shingo Nakano

19 October 2024 17	BG Tampines Rovers (Singapore)	2–3	(Japan) Albirex Niigata (S)	Jalan Besar
	Kyoga Nakamura 55'; Faris Ramli 60' (yellow card) 66'; Saifullah Akbar (yellow card) 28'; Joel Chew (yellow card) 62'		Yohei Otake 12'; Shingo Nakano 45+2'; Daniel Goh 85'; Ryhan Stewart (yellow card) 90+2'	Stadium: Jalan Besar Stadium; Referee: Muhammad Taqi; Man of the Match: (Singapore) Daniel Goh

29 October 2024 18	Albirex Niigata (S) (Japan)	2–1	(Singapore) Hougang United	Jurong East
	Yohei Otake 85'; Shingo Nakano 90+2' (pen.); Yojiro Takahagi (yellow card) 90+3'; Ryhan Stewart (yellow card) 90+7'; Hassan Sunny (yellow card) 90+10'		Stjepan Plazonja 42' (yellow card) 90+5'; Jordan Vestering (yellow card) 59'; Ensar Brunčević (yellow card) 90'; Dejan Račić (yellow card) 90+5'; Shodai Yokoyama (yellow card) 90+7'	Stadium: Jurong East Stadium; Referee: Ahmad A'Qashah; Man of the Match: (Japan) Yohei Otake

2 November 2024 19	Albirex Niigata (S) (Japan)	2–3	(Brunei) DPMM	Jurong East
	Shingo Nakano 45+2'; SteviaEgbus Mikuni 61'; Daniel Goh (yellow card) 78'		Azwan Ali Rahman 45+9' (yellow card) 70'; Miguel Oliveira 48'; Azwan Saleh 90+5'; Nazry Aiman Azaman (yellow card) 34'; Farshad Noor (yellow card) 74'; Jamie McAllister (yellow card) 89'; Hakeme Yazid Said (yellow card) 90+4'	Stadium: Jurong East Stadium; Referee: Zulfiqar Mustaffa; Man of the Match: (Brunei) Azwan Saleh

23 November 2024 20 (Rescheduled)	Young Lions FC (Singapore)	0–1	(Japan) Albirex Niigata (S)	Jalan Besar
	Nyqil Iyyan (yellow card) 27'; Nazri Nasir (red card) 43'; Itsuki Enomoto (yellow card) 62'		Arya Igami Tarhani 77'; Arshad Shamim (yellow card) 90+2'	Stadium: Jalan Besar Stadium; Referee: Andrea Verolino; Man of the Match: (Japan) (Iran) Arya Igami Tarhani

17 January 2025 21	Lion City Sailors (Singapore)	6–0	(Japan) Albirex Niigata (S)	Bishan
	Shawal Anuar 16'; Lennart Thy 32', 52'; Bart Ramselaar 36'; Song Ui-young 45+1' (yellow card) 27'; Sergio Carmona 66'			Stadium: Bishan Stadium; Referee: Jansen Foo; Man of the Match: (Germany) Lennart Thy

9 February 2025 22	Albirex Niigata (S) (Japan)	1–1	(Singapore) Geylang International	Jurong East
	Ryhan Stewart 90+5'; Shingo Nakano (penalty missed) 7 (yellow card) 90+1'; Stevia Egbus Mikuni (yellow card) 42' (yellow-red card) 65'; Syed Firdaus Hassan (yellow card) 59'; Arshad Shamim (yellow card) 69'; Yohei Otake (yellow card) 71'		Tomoyuki Doi 23'; Keito Hariya (yellow card) 6'; Shakir Hamzah (yellow card) 60'; Akmal Azman (yellow card) 82'	Stadium: Jurong East Stadium; Referee: Jansen Foo; Man of the Match: (Singapore) Ryhan Stewart

21 February 2025 23	Tanjong Pagar United (Singapore)	1–2	(Japan) Albirex Niigata (S)	Jurong East
	Timur Talipov 61' (pen.); Raihan Rahman (yellow card) 51' (yellow-red card) 83'		Matt Silva 25' (o.g.); Shuhei Hoshino 90+1'	Stadium: Jurong East Stadium; Referee: Hilmi Fuad; Man of the Match: (Japan) Shuhei Hoshino

27 February 2025 24	Albirex Niigata (S) (Japan)	4–0	(Singapore) Balestier Khalsa	Jurong East
	Shingo Nakano 38', 45+1'; Yohei Otake 45'; Amy Recha 89'			Stadium: Jurong East Stadium; Referee: Zulfiqar Mustaffa; Man of the Match: (Japan) Shingo Nakano

9 March 2025 25	Albirex Niigata (S) (Japan)	0–4	(Singapore) BG Tampines Rovers	Jurong East
	Naoki Yoshioka (yellow card) 35'; Ryhan Stewart (yellow card) 51'; Shingo Nakano (yellow card) 61'		Itsuki Enomoto 27'; Arya Igami Tarhani 47'; Seia Kunori 52'; Miloš Zlatković 81'	Stadium: Jurong East Stadium; Referee: Clarence Leow; Man of the Match: (Japan) Seia Kunori

5 April 2025 26	Hougang United (Singapore)	1–0	(Japan) Albirex Niigata (S)	Jalan Besar
	Dejan Račić 74'; Stjepan Plazonja (yellow card) 50'; Shahdan Sulaiman (yellow card) 59'			Stadium: Jalan Besar Stadium; Referee: Andrea Verolino; Man of the Match: (Montenegro) Dejan Račić

13 April 2025 27	Albirex Niigata (S) (Japan)	0–0	(Singapore) Young Lions	Jurong East
	Syed Firdaus Hassan (yellow card) 53'		Andrew Aw (yellow card) 19'	Stadium: Jurong East Stadium; Referee: Hilmi Fuad; Man of the Match: (Singapore) Rauf Erwan

19 April 2025 28	DPMM FC (Brunei)	3–0	(Japan) Albirex Niigata (S)	Bandar Seri Begawan
	Dāvis Ikaunieks 34', 61' (pen.); Hakeme Yazid Said 48'; Azwan Ali Rahman (yellow card) 37'		Syed Firdaus (yellow card) 45'; Arshad Shamim (yellow card) 73'	Stadium: Hassanal Bolkiah National Stadium; Referee: Syarqawi Buhari; Man of the Match: (Latvia) Dāvis Ikaunieks

25 April 2025 29	Albirex Niigata (S) (Japan)	0–2	(Singapore) Lion City Sailors	Tampines
	Shuhei Hoshino (yellow card) 49'; Koki Kawachi (yellow card) 82'		Toni Datković 25'; Shawal Anuar 77'; Hariss Harun (yellow card) 69'	Stadium: Our Tampines Hub (Note: Location changed to Our Tampines Hub due to General Election 2025 and potential closures of selected ActiveSG facilities, including stadiums that are typically used for SPL fixtures); Referee: Ahmad A'Qashah; Man of the Match: (Belgium) Maxime Lestienne

11 May 2025 30	Geylang International (Singapore)	1–4	(Japan) Albirex Niigata (S)	Tampines
	Iqbal Hussain 48'; Keito Hariya (red card) 74'		Shingo Nakano 15', 81'; Yohei Otake 75'; Amy Recha 85'	Stadium: Our Tampines Hub (Note: Location changed to Our Tampines Hub due to JBS stadium not available.); Referee: Farhan Mohd; Man of the Match: (Japan) Shingo Nakano

16 May 2025 31	Albirex Niigata (S) (Japan)	5–1	(Singapore) Tanjong Pagar United	Jurong East
	Shingo Nakano 4', 78'; Junki Kenn Yoshimura 42'; Thorsten Takashi Cross 66' (o.g.); Shuhei Hoshino 83'; Daniel Goh (penalty missed) 87; Arshad Shamim (yellow card) 24'; SteviaEgbus Mikuni (yellow card) 74'		Salif Cissé 14'; Marcus Mosses (yellow card) 58'; Sahil Suhaimi (yellow card) 90+1'	Stadium: Jurong East Stadium; Referee: Syarqawi Buhari; Man of the Match: (Japan) Shingo Nakano

25 May 2025 32 (Rescheduled)	Balestier Khalsa (Singapore)	3–2	(Japan) Albirex Niigata (S)	Bishan
	Anton Fase 28'; Masahiro Sugita 45'; Reycredo Beremanda 90+5'; Fudhil I’yadh (yellow card) 86'		Koki Kawachi 51', 69' (yellow card) 45+3'; Syed Firdaus Hassan (yellow card) 58'; SteviaEgbus Mikuni (yellow card) 64'; Arshad Shamim (yellow card) 79'	Stadium: Bishan Stadium; Referee: Oswind Suriya

Pos	Team	Pld	W	D	L	GF	GA	GD	Pts	Qualification or relegation
1	Lion City Sailors (C)	32	22	6	4	96	32	+64	72	Qualification for Champions League Two group stage & ASEAN Club Championship (Note: Since the winners of the 2024–25 Singapore Cup, Lion City Sailors, had already qualified for the AFC Champions League Two and ASEAN Club Championship, the spot given to the Singapore Cup winners (Champions League Two) was passed to the second-placed team.)
2	BG Tampines Rovers	32	19	7	6	84	37	+47	64	Qualification for Champions League Two group stage & ASEAN Club Championship
3	Geylang International	32	15	9	8	97	64	+33	54	
4	Balestier Khalsa	32	14	6	12	84	80	+4	48	
5	DPMM (Note: Ineligible for AFC competition spots)	32	12	8	12	54	61	−7	44	Transferred to the 2025–26 Malaysia Super League post-season
6	Albirex Niigata (S)	32	13	3	16	55	71	−16	42	
7	Hougang United	32	7	10	15	61	76	−15	31	
8	Young Lions	32	7	8	17	47	89	−42	29	
9	Tanjong Pagar United	32	3	7	22	35	103	−68	16	

Updated to match(es) played on 25 May 2025. Source: Singapore Premier League
Rules for classification: 1) points; 2) goal difference; 3) number of goals scored; 4) number of wins
(C) Champions

=== Singapore Cup ===
Pos	Team	Pld	W	D	L	GF	GA	GD	Pts	Qualification
1	BG Tampines Rovers	4	3	1	0	12	4	+8	10	Semi-finals
2	DPMM	4	2	1	1	7	7	0	7	Semi-finals
3	Young Lions	4	2	0	2	11	7	+4	6	
4	Hougang United	4	2	0	2	8	10	−2	6	
5	Albirex Niigata (S)	4	0	0	4	4	14	−10	0	

Source: FAS

1 February 2025 Group Match 1	Albriex Niigata (S) (Japan)	1–2	(Singapore) Hougang United	Jurong East
	Shingo Nakano 63'	Report	Zulfahmi Arifin 18'; Dejan Račić 21'; Ismail Salihović (yellow card) 22'; Danish Irfan (yellow card) 65'	Stadium: Jurong East Stadium; Referee: Andrea Verolino

15 February 2025 Group Match 2	Albriex Niigata (S) (Japan)	1–2	(Singapore) BG Tampines Rovers	Jurong East
	Arshad Shamim 82'	Report	Arya Igami Tarhani 52'; Koki Kawachi 64' (o.g.); Joel Chew (yellow card) 82'	Stadium: Jurong East Stadium; Referee: Hilmi Fuad

3 March 2025 Group Match 3	DPMM FC (Brunei)	3–1	(Japan) Albriex Niigata (S)	Jalan Besar
	Dāvis Ikaunieks 30', 88'; Nurikhwan Othman 72'; Miguel Oliveira (yellow card) 74'	Report	Shingo Nakano 80'; Junki Kenn Yoshimura (yellow card) 40'	Stadium: Jalan Besar Stadium; Referee: Jansen Foo

28 March 2025 Group Match 4	Young Lions (Singapore)	7–1	(Japan) Albriex Niigata (S)	Jalan Besar
	Kaisei Ogawa 5', 21', 58', 66'; Kan Kobayashi 12', 80'; Amir Syafiz 61'; Fairuz Fazli Koh (yellow card) 78'		Daniel Goh 9'; Gareth Low (yellow card) 26' (yellow-red card); SteviaEgbus Mikuni (yellow card) 29'	Stadium: Jalan Besar Stadium; Referee: Oswind Suriya
