= 2023 Albirex Niigata (S) Women season =

Albirex Niigata (S)
2023 season
- Chairman: Daisuke Korenaga
- Head coach: (Singapore) Nahar Daud
- Women Premier League: 1st
- Top goalscorer: Kana Kitahara (17 goals)

The 2023 season is Albirex Niigata (S) Women's second season in the top flight of Singapore women's football, the Women's Premier League.

Their marquee player was former Japan international Kana Kitahara.

== Squad ==
=== Women Squad ===
As of 5 February 2022

| Squad No. | Name | Nationality | Date of birth (age) | Previous club | Contract start | Contract end |
Goalkeepers
| 1 | Nur Izzati | (Singapore) | 3 December 2005 (age 20) | (Singapore) | 2023 | 2023 |
| 25 | Maisarah Ramat | (Singapore) | 16 October 1993 (age 32) | (Singapore) Ottawa Serpent FC | 2022 | 2023 |
Defenders
| 3 | Kana Kitahara | (Japan) | 7 December 1988 (age 37) | (Japan) MyNavi Sendai | 2022 | 2023 |
| 5 | Cynthia Taye Shi Ya | (Singapore) | 17 February 1984 (age 42) | (Singapore) | 2022 | 2023 |
| 6 | Marina Asada | (Japan) | 26 December 1998 (age 27) | (Japan) Chifure AS Elfen Saitama | 2023 | 2023 |
| 13 | Sun Jie | (Singapore) (China) | 31 July 1985 (age 40) | (Singapore) | 2023 | 2023 |
| 17 | Nur Emilia Natasha | (Singapore) | 15 January 1999 (age 27) | (Singapore) Police SA | 2022 | 2023 |
| 18 | Wee Xin Yi | (Singapore) | 1 February 2000 (age 26) | (Singapore) | 2022 | 2023 |
| 23 | Marilou Bautista Rubio | (Philippines) | 28 September 1975 (age 50) | (Philippines) Far Eastern University | 2022 | 2023 |
| 54 | Dini Danisha | (Singapore) | 6 April 2003 (age 23) | (Singapore) Home United | 2022 | 2023 |
Midfielders
| 8 | Noralinda Wahab | (Singapore) | 8 March 1994 (age 32) | (Singapore) Kaki Bukit SC | 2022 | 2023 |
| 9 | Nadhra Aqilah | (Singapore) | 12 April 1994 (age 32) | (Singapore) Tanjong Pagar United | 2022 | 2023 |
| 14 | Suriati Soony | (Singapore) | 26 June 1993 (age 32) | (Singapore) Kaki Bukit SC | 2022 | 2023 |
| 15 | Jill Quek Chwee Peng | (Singapore) | 30 August 1978 (age 47) | (Singapore) | 2023 | 2023 |
| 20 | Siti Erma Ellyana | (Singapore) | 20 June 1989 (age 37) | (Singapore) Bukit Gombak Women | 2022 | 2023 |
| 24 | Nur Sarah Zu'risqha | (Singapore) | 24 July 2006 (age 19) | (Singapore) | 2022 | 2023 |
| 30 | Sierra Castles | (United States) | 14 October 2000 (age 25) | (United States) Texas Tech Red Raiders | 2023 | 2023 |
| 66 | Nurul Unaisah | (Singapore) | 12 July 2003 (age 22) | (Singapore) | 2022 | 2023 |
| 69 | Noriko Farahsyazwani | (Singapore) | 8 October 1996 (age 29) | (Singapore) Bishan Arsenal | 2023 | 2023 |
| 77 | Siti Nor Aqilah | (Singapore) | 17 October 2001 (age 24) | (Singapore) Tampines Changkat CSC | 2022 | 2023 |
| 97 | Lauren Reese | (Wales) | 3 May 1997 (age 29) | (Wales) Wrexham AFC Women | 2022 | 2023 |
Strikers
| 2 | Nurhidayah Shah | (Singapore) | 16 April 1991 (age 35) | (Singapore) | 2022 | 2023 |
| 7 | Huraizah Ismail | (Singapore) | 2 June 1984 (age 42) | (Singapore) Police SA | 2022 | 2023 |
| 11 | Tina Afrida Nasmi | (Singapore) | 5 April 1982 (age 44) | (Singapore) | 2022 | 2023 |
Players who left club during season
| 10 | Irsalina Irwan | (Singapore) | 1 January 2007 (age 19) | (Singapore) ActiveSG | 2022 | 2023 |

== Coaching staff ==
| Position | Name |
|---|---|
| Technical Director | (Japan) Kazuaki Yoshinaga |
| Head Coach (Men) | (Japan) Kazuaki Yoshinaga |
| Head Coach (Women) | (Singapore) Nahar Daud |
| Assistant Coach | (Japan) Keiji Shigetomi (Singapore) Jaswinder Singh |
| Goalkeeper Coach (Men) | (Singapore) Fadhil Salim |
| Goalkeeper Coach (Women) | (Singapore) Bryan Quek |
| Sports Trainer | (Japan) Tomoya Ueta |
| Fitness Coach | (Japan) Masayuki Kato |
| U15 Coach | (Spain) Marçal Trulls Sevillano |
| U19 Coach | (Singapore) Jaswinder Singh |
| Team Manager (Men) | (Singapore) Dominic Wong |
| Team Manager (Women) | (Singapore) Nadhra Aqilah |
| Physiotherapist | (Singapore) Karen Koh (Singapore) Alison Soh |
| Kitman | (Singapore) Roy Krishnan (Singapore) Muhammad Taufik |
| Interpreter | (Japan) Masayuki Kato |

== Transfer ==
=== In ===
Preseason

| Position | Player | Transferred from | Team | Ref |
|---|---|---|---|---|
| GK | (Singapore) Nur Izzati | (Singapore) | Women | Free |
| DF | (Singapore) Sun Jie | (Singapore) | Women | Free |
| DF | (Singapore) Noriko Farahsyazwani | (Singapore) | Women | Free |
| MF | (Singapore) Jill Quek Chwee Peng | (Singapore) | Women | Free |

Note 1: .

Mid-season

| Position | Player | Transferred from | Team | Ref |
|---|---|---|---|---|
| DF | (Japan) Marina Asada | (Japan) Chifure AS Elfen Saitama | Women | Free |
| MF | (United States) Sierra Castles | (United States) Texas Tech Red Raiders | Women | Free |

=== Loan In ===
Preseason

| Position | Player | Transferred from | Ref |

=== Loan Return ===
Preseason

| Position | Player | Transferred To / From | Ref |

=== Out ===
Preseason

| Position | Player | Transferred To | Team | Ref |
|---|---|---|---|---|
| GK | (Singapore) Nurul Radiatul | (Singapore) | Women | Free |
| GK | (Singapore) Lynse Ann Sng | (Singapore) | Women | Free |
| DF | (Singapore) Nur Shaahidah Zulkifli | (Singapore) Geylang International (W) | Women | Free |
| MF | (Singapore) Noridah Abdullah | (Singapore) Geylang International (W) | Women | Free |
| MF | (Singapore) Nadya Zah | (Singapore) Geylang International (W) | Women | Free |
| MF | (Singapore) Nur Maisarah | (Singapore) | Women | Free |
| MF | (Singapore) Chloe Poh Yee Fang | (Singapore) | Women | Free |
| MF | (Singapore) Amirah Syahirah | (Singapore) | Women | Free |
| MF | (Singapore) Wan Nashirah | (Singapore) Balestier Khalsa Women | Women | Free |
| FW | (Singapore) Nuur Fitri Ardilla | (Singapore) | Women | Free |

Mid-season

| Position | Player | Transferred To | Team | Ref |
|---|---|---|---|---|
| DF | (Singapore) Irsalina Irwan | (United States) IMG Academy | First Team | Free |

=== Loan Out ===
| Position | Player | Transferred To | Ref |

== Friendly ==
=== Pre-season ===
Win Draw Loss

== Team statistics ==
=== Appearances and goals (Women) ===
As of 10 Sept 2022

| No. | Pos. | Player | WPL | | Total | |
| No. | Pos. | Player | Apps. | Goals | Apps. | Goals |
|---|---|---|---|---|---|---|
| 2 | FW | (Singapore) Nurhidayah Shah | 1 | 0 | 0 | 0 |
| 3 | DF | (Japan) Kana Kitahara | 3+1 | 17 | 0 | 0 |
| 5 | DF | (Singapore) Cynthia Taye Shi Ya | 2 | 0 | 0 | 0 |
| 6 | MF | (Japan) Marina Asada | 4 | 12 | 0 | 0 |
| 7 | MF | (Singapore) Huraizah Ismail | 1 | 0 | 0 | 0 |
| 8 | FW | (Singapore) Noralinda Wahab | 0 | 2 | 0 | 0 |
| 9 | FW | (Singapore) Nadhra Aqilah | 0 | 1 | 0 | 0 |
| 11 | MF | (Singapore) Tina Afrida Nasmi | 0+1 | 4 | 0 | 0 |
| 13 | MF | (Singapore) (China) Sun Jie | 2 | 0 | 0 | 0 |
| 14 | MF | (Singapore) Suriati Soony | ? | 3 | 0 | 0 |
| 15 | MF | (Singapore) Jill Quek Chwee Ping | 2 | 1 | 0 | 0 |
| 17 | DF | (Singapore) Nur Emilia Natasha | 2 | 0 | 0 | 0 |
| 18 | DF | (Singapore) Wee Xin Yi | 2 | 0 | 0 | 0 |
| 20 | DF | (Singapore) Nurul Unaisah | 0 | 0 | 0 | 0 |
| 22 | MF | (Singapore) Siti Nor Aqilah | 0 | 0 | 0 | 0 |
| 23 | DF | (Philippines) Marilou Bautista Rubio | 0 | 0 | 0 | 0 |
| 24 | MF | (Singapore) Nur Sarah Zu'risqha | ? | 7 | 0 | 0 |
| 25 | GK | (Singapore) Maisarah Ramat | 2 | 0 | 0 | 0 |
| 30 | MF | (United States) Sierra Castles | 3 | 6 | 0 | 0 |
| 54 | DF | (Singapore) Dini Dannisha | 2 | 0 | 0 | 0 |
| 66 | DF | (Singapore) Nurul Unaisah | 2 | 1 | 0 | 0 |
| 73 | MF | (Singapore) Siti Erma Ellyana | 0 | 1 | 0 | 0 |
Players who have played this season but had left the club or on loan to other club
| 10 | DF | (Singapore) Irsalina Irwan | ? | 5 | ? | 5 |
| 97 | MF | (England) Lauren Reese | ? | 1 | ? | 1 |

== Competitions ==
=== Women's Premier League ===
Win Draw Loss

| 18 March 2023 1 | Albirex Niigata (S) (Japan) | 5–1 | (Singapore) Tiong Bahru FC | Choa Chu Kang |
| | Lauren Reese 20'; Kana Kitahara 62', 74'; 77' (o.g.); Tina Afrida Nasmi 88' | | Rabi Atul Ardawiyah 89' | Stadium: Choa Chu Kang Stadium |

| 28 March 2023 2 | Albirex Niigata (S) (Japan) | 4–0 | (Singapore) Balestier Khalsa | Choa Chu Kang |
| | Jill Quek Chwee Ping 32'; 48' (o.g.); Irsalina Irwan 44', 60' | | Rabi Atul Ardawiyah 89' | Stadium: Choa Chu Kang Stadium |

| 20 May 2023 3 | Albirex Niigata (S) (Japan) | 6–0 | (Singapore) Geylang International | Choa Chu Kang |
| | Kana Kitahara 33', 62', 71', 86'; Tina Afrida Nasmi 36'; Nur Sarah Zu'risqha 37' | | | Stadium: Choa Chu Kang Stadium |

| 28 May 2023 4 | Albirex Niigata (S) (Japan) | 2–1 | (Singapore) Hougang United | Choa Chu Kang |
| | Kana Kitahara 71', 89' | | Nicole Lim 8' | Stadium: Choa Chu Kang Stadium |

| 18 June 2023 5 | Albirex Niigata (S) (Japan) | 1–1 | (Singapore) Lion City Sailors | Yishun |
| | Nur Izzati Rosni 18' (pen.) | | Tina Afrida Nasmi 89' | Stadium: Yishun Stadium |

| 25 June 2023 6 | Albirex Niigata (S) (Japan) | 1–1 | (Singapore) Police SA | Yishun |
| | Kana Kitahara | | | Stadium: Yishun Stadium |

| 23 July 2023 7 | Albirex Niigata (S) (Japan) | 2–1 | (Singapore) Still Aerion | Choa Chu Kang |
| | Kana Kitahara 22'; Suriati Soony 88' | | Janine Lim 27' | Stadium: Choa Chu Kang Stadium |

| 29 July 2023 8 | Albirex Niigata (S) (Japan) | 4–1 | (Singapore) Tampines Rovers | Choa Chu Kang |
| | Kana Kitahara 18', 43'; Tina Afrida Nasmi 38'; Marina Asada 79' | | Farhanah Ruhaizat 19' | Stadium: Choa Chu Kang Stadium |

| 6 August 2023 9 | Albirex Niigata (S) (Japan) | 1–1 | (Singapore) Tanjong Pagar United | Choa Chu Kang |
| | Noralinda Wahab 31' | | Joie Teo 53' | Stadium: Choa Chu Kang Stadium |

| 12 August 2023 10 | Albirex Niigata (S) (Japan) | 10–0 | (Singapore) Tiong Bahru | Choa Chu Kang |
| | Kana Kitahara 12', 58'; Sierra Castles 16', 65'; Marina Asada 60', 80'; Irsalina Irwan 66', 68', 85'; Nur Sarah Zu'risqha 67' | | | Stadium: Choa Chu Kang Stadium |

| 20 August 2023 11 | Albirex Niigata (S) (Japan) | 9–1 | (Singapore) Balestier Khalsa | Choa Chu Kang |
| | Emma Ellyana 15'; Sierra Castles 16'; Marina Asada 39', 69'; Nur Sarah Zu'risqha 52', 55', 73'; Kana Kitahara 53'; Nurul Unaisah 85' | | Sydney Hector 90+1' | Stadium: Choa Chu Kang Stadium |

| 26 August 2023 12 | Albirex Niigata (S) (Japan) | 11–0 | (Singapore) Geylang International | Choa Chu Kang |
| | Marina Asada 10', 36', 65'; Sierra Castles 14'; Nur Sarah Zu'risqha 47', 63'; Kana Kitahara 60'; Suriati Soony 81', 89'; 82' (o.g.); Noralinda Wahab 88' | | | Stadium: Choa Chu Kang Stadium |

| 15 October 2023 13 | Albirex Niigata (S) (Japan) | 3–0 | (Singapore) Geylang International | Choa Chu Kang |
| | Kana Kitahara 22'; Marina Asada 81', 89' | | | Stadium: Choa Chu Kang Stadium |

| 22 October 2023 14 | Albirex Niigata (S) (Japan) | 4–1 | (Singapore) Geylang International | Choa Chu Kang |
| | Marina Asada 14'; Sierra Castles 24', 48'; 30' (o.g.) | | Angeline Sarka 41' | Stadium: Choa Chu Kang Stadium |

| 29 October 2023 15 | Albirex Niigata (S) (Japan) | 0–3 | (Singapore) Lion City Sailors | Clementi |
| | | | | Stadium: Clementi Stadium |

| 5 November 2023 16 | Albirex Niigata (S) (Japan) | 3–1 | (Singapore) Still Aerion | Choa Chu Kang |
| | Marina Asada 17', 81'; Nadhra Aqilah 90+1' | | Carmen Calisto 21' | Stadium: Choa Chu Kang Stadium |

League table

| Pos | Team | Pld | W | D | L | GF | GA | GD | Pts | Qualification or relegation |
|---|---|---|---|---|---|---|---|---|---|---|
| 1 | Albirex Niigata (S) | 4 | 4 | 0 | 0 | 17 | 2 | +15 | 12 | League champions |
| 2 | Lion City Sailors | 4 | 4 | 0 | 0 | 9 | 0 | +9 | 12 | |
| 3 | Hougang United | 4 | 3 | 0 | 1 | 7 | 2 | +5 | 9 | |
| 4 | Police SA | 4 | 3 | 0 | 1 | 7 | 3 | +4 | 9 | |
| 5 | Tanjong Pagar United | 4 | 2 | 0 | 2 | 10 | 3 | +7 | 6 | |
| 6 | Balestier Khalsa | 4 | 2 | 0 | 2 | 8 | 9 | −1 | 6 | |
| 7 | JSSL Tampines | 4 | 1 | 0 | 3 | 8 | 4 | +4 | 3 | |
| 8 | Still Aerion | 4 | 1 | 0 | 3 | 2 | 7 | −5 | 3 | |
| 9 | Tiong Bahru | 4 | 0 | 0 | 4 | 2 | 18 | −16 | 0 | |
| 10 | Geylang International | 4 | 0 | 0 | 4 | 0 | 21 | −21 | 0 | |

Updated to match(es) played on 1 October 2022. Source: FAS
