= 2023 Women's Premier League =

2023 Women's Premier League may refer to:

- 2023 Women's Premier League (Singapore)
- 2023 Women's Premier League (cricket)
- 2022–23 Scottish Women's Premier League
