= Takahiro Koga =

Japanese footballer (born 1999)

Takahiro Koga 古賀 貴大
Personal information
- Date of birth: 11 March 1999 (age 27)
- Place of birth: Saga, Japan
- Height: 1.93 m (6 ft 4 in)
- Position: Goalkeeper

Team information
- Current team: Hougang United
- Number: 17

Youth career
- –2010: Asahi FC
- 2011–2013: Tosu Nishi Junior High School
- 2014–2016: Tosu Kogyo High School

College career
Years	Team	Apps	(Gls)
2017–2018	Kyushu Sogo Sports College		

Senior career*
Years	Team	Apps	(Gls)
2019–2020	V-Varen Nagasaki	0	(0)
2021–2022	Albirex Niigata (S)	48	(0)
2023–2025	SC Sagamihara	6	(0)
2025	FC Osaka		
2025–2026	Albirex Niigata (S)		
2026–	Hougang United		
- * Club domestic league appearances and goals as of July 2026

Takahiro Koga (古賀 貴大, Koga Takahiro; born 11 March 1999) is a Japanese professional footballer who plays as a goalkeeper for Singapore Premier League club Hougang United.

== Club career ==
=== Albirex Niigata (S) ===
On 18 January 2021, Koga joined Albirex Niigata (S) from V-Varen Nagasaki. In his first season, he won the Golden Glove award after keeping 8 clean sheets in 20 league games, at least three more than any other goalkeeper, and was also included in the 2021 Singapore Premier League 'Team of the Year'. In his second season with the club, he helped them win the 2022 Singapore Premier League title. On 17 December 2022, Koga announced he would return to Japan. He kept 14 clean sheets in 55 games in all competition for Albirex.

=== SC Sagamihara ===
After 2 successful seasons at Albirex Niigata (S), Koga join J3 League team SC Sagamihara. On 3 June 2023, he made his debut for the club against Matsumoto Yamaga in a league match which resulted in a 5–3 loss. Koga went on to make another 4 consecutive appearances for the club. On 7 June, he played in the Emperor's Cup second round tie against J1 League club Hokkaido Consadole Sapporo, putting a string of saves.

=== FC Osaka ===
On 20 January 2025, Koga moved to another J3 League club FC Osaka on a year contract.

=== Return to Albirex Niigata (S) ===
On 25 July 2025, Koga returned to Albirex Niigata (S) ahead of the 2025–26 season. He kept a crucial clean sheet, in a 2-0 win over Geylang International FC, in his first SPL appearance since rejoining the team. However, it was announced that Koga will depart the club following the expiration of his contract.

== Honours ==
=== Club ===
Albirex Niigata (S)

- Singapore Premier League: 2022

=== Individual ===
- Singapore Premier League Golden Glove: 2021
- Singapore Premier League Team of the Year: 2021

== Career statistics ==
Club	Season	League			Cup		Other		Total	
Club	Season	Division	Apps	Goals	Apps	Goals	Apps	Goals	Apps	Goals
Albirex Niigata (S)	2021	SPL	21	0	0	0	0	0	21	0
Albirex Niigata (S)	2022	SPL	27	0	5	0	1	0	34	0
SC Sagamihara	2023	J3	6	0	1	0	0	0	7	0
