= Daniel Goh (footballer) =

Singaporean association football player

Personal information
- Full name: Daniel Goh Ji Xiong
- Date of birth: 13 August 1999 (age 27)
- Place of birth: Singapore
- Height: 1.72 m (5 ft 8 in)
- Position: Forward

Team information
- Current team: Balestier Khalsa
- Number: 7

Youth career
- –2015: Home United
- 2016–2017: Hougang United

Senior career*
Years	Team	Apps	(Gls)
2018	Hougang United	2	(0)
2019	Balestier Khalsa	20	(2)
2020	Albirex Niigata (S)	2	(0)
2021–2022	→ Young Lions (loan)	11	(1)
2022–2023	Balestier Khalsa	39	(12)
2024–2025	Albirex Niigata (S)	24	(5)
2025–	Balestier Khalsa	27	(7)

International career^{‡}
2017–2018	Singapore U19	6	(0)
2019–2022	Singapore U23	4	(2)
2023–	Singapore	5	(0)
Medal record
Men's football
Representing Singapore
Merlion Cup
Winner	2019 Singapore
- * Club domestic league appearances and goals as of 21 November 2026 ‡ National team caps and goals as of 23 March 2023

Daniel Goh Ji Xiong (Note: Chinese: 吴基雄; pinyin: Wú Jīxióng) (born 13 August 1999) is a Singaporean professional footballer who plays as a forward for Singapore Premier League club Balestier Khalsa and the Singapore national team.

== Club career ==
=== Hougang United ===
Goh signed with Hougang United's prime league squad in 2018, and was later promoted to the first team, he made three appearances for the club in the 2018 Singapore Premier League.

=== Balestier Khalsa ===
Goh then signed with Balestier Khalsa for the 2019 campaign and became a regular starter for the club. He made his debut on 9 March 2019, against his former club Hougang United.

=== Albirex Niigata (S) ===
In 2020, Goh then signed with Albirex Niigata (S) to play in the 2020 Singapore Premier League season as one of the lightning fast players from his former club Balestier Khalsa. In July the same year, he was enlisted into National Service.

=== Young Lions ===
Goh was than loaned to Young Lions for the 2021 Singapore Premier League seasons to get more playing time while he was serving in the National Service.

=== Return to Balestier Khalsa ===
On 2 May 2022, Goh rejoined his former club Balestier Khalsa after he completed his National Service.

=== Return to Albirex Niigata (S) ===
On 29 December 2023, Albirex Niigata announced his return to the club since 2020 after a good season at Balestier Khalsa. On 18 July 2024, Daniel became the first Singaporean to score a hat-trick in the 2024–25 season where he alongside teammate Shingo Nakano also scoring a hat-trick in the same game where they thrashed Balestier Khalsa 7–2.

=== Third stint at Balestier Khalsa ===
On 19 July 2025, Goh returned to Balestier Khalsa.

== International career ==
=== Youth ===
Goh was first called up to the Singapore U22 squad for the 2019 Merlion Cup. Goh made his debut and his first start for the under-22s on 7 June 2019, against Philippines. Goh recorded an assist on his debut, providing the pass for Ikhsan Fandi to score.

=== Senior ===
Goh's performance in the 2023 Singapore Premier League season earned him a call-up to the Lions international fixtures against Hong Kong and Macau. Goh came on as a substitute against Hong Kong in the second half. The match ended in a draw 1–1.

== Career statistics ==
=== Club ===
As of 21 November 2026.

Club	Season	Division	Singapore Premier League		Singapore Cup		Community Shield		Asia		Total	
Club	Season	Division	Apps	Goals	Apps	Goals	Apps	Goals	Apps	Goals	Apps	Goals
Hougang United	2018	Singapore Premier League	2	0	0	0	–		0	0	0	0
Balestier Khalsa	2019	Singapore Premier League	20	2	2	0	–		0	0	22	2
Albirex Niigata (S)	2020	Singapore Premier League	2	0	0	0	–		0	0	2	0
Young Lions	2021	Singapore Premier League	9	1	0	0	–		0	0	9	1
Young Lions	2022	Singapore Premier League	2	0	0	0	–		0	0	2	0
Young Lions	Total		11	1	0	0	0	0	0	0	11	1
Balestier Khalsa	2022	Singapore Premier League	16	5	6	3	–		0	0	22	8
Balestier Khalsa	2023	Singapore Premier League	23	7	2	1	–		0	0	25	8
Balestier Khalsa	Total		39	12	8	4	0	0	0	0	47	16
Albirex Niigata (S)	2024–25	Singapore Premier League	24	5	4	1	1	0	0	0	29	6
Balestier Khalsa	2025–26	Singapore Premier League	20	5	6	1	–		0	0	26	6
Balestier Khalsa	2026–27	Singapore Premier League	7	2	0	0	–		0	0	7	2
Balestier Khalsa	Total		27	7	6	1	0	0	0	0	33	8
Career total			125	27	20	6	1	0	0	0	146	33

=== International statistics ===
==== International caps ====
No	Date	Venue	Opponent	Result	Competition
1	23 March 2023	Mong Kok Stadium, Hong Kong	Hong Kong	1–1	Friendly
2	26 March 2023	Macau Olympic Complex Stadium, Macau	Macau	1–0	Friendly
3	16 June 2023	National Stadium, Singapore	Papua New Guinea	2–2	Friendly
5	8 September 2023	Bishan Stadium, Singapore	Tajikistan	0–2 (lost)	Friendly

==== U23 International caps ====
No	Date	Venue	Opponent	Result	Competition
1	7 June 2019	Jalan Besar Stadium, Kallang, Singapore	Philippines	3-0 (won)	2019 Merlion Cup
2	9 June 2019	Jalan Besar Stadium, Kallang, Singapore	Thailand	1-0 (won)	2019 Merlion Cup
3	6 September 2019	Bishan Stadium, Bishan, Singapore	Fiji	2-0 (won)	Friendly
4	9 October 2019	Bishan Stadium, Bishan, Singapore	United Arab Emirates	0-3 (lost)	Friendly
5	25 October 2021	Jalan Besar Stadium, Jalan Besar, Singapore	Timor-Leste	2-2 (draw)	2022 AFC U-23 Asian Cup qualification

==== U23 International goals ====
Scores and results list Singapore's goal tally first.

No.	Date	Venue	Opponent	Score	Result	Competition
1.	6 September 2019	Bishan Stadium, Bishan	Fiji	2–0	2–0	Friendly
2.	13 October 2019	Bishan Stadium, Bishan	Macau	4–0	4–0	Friendly

==== U19 International caps ====
No	Date	Venue	Opponent	Result	Competition
1	6 September 2017	Thuwunna Stadium, Yangon, Myanmar	Malaysia	1-3 (lost)	2017 AFF U-18 Youth Championship
2	8 September 2017	Thuwunna Stadium, Yangon, Myanmar	Laos	3-0 (won)	2017 AFF U-18 Youth Championship
3	10 September 2017	Thuwunna Stadium, Yangon, Myanmar	Thailand	0-3 (lost)	2017 AFF U-18 Youth Championship
4	12 September 2017	Thuwunna Stadium, Yangon, Myanmar	Timor-Leste	1-3 (lost)	2017 AFF U-18 Youth Championship
5	1 July 2018	Gelora Joko Samudro Stadium, Gresik, Indonesia	Philippines	1-2 (lost)	2018 AFF U-18 Youth Championship
6	3 July 2018	Gelora Joko Samudro Stadium, Gresik, Indonesia	Indonesia	0-4 (lost)	2018 AFF U-18 Youth Championship

== Honours ==
=== Club ===
==== Albirex Niigata (S) ====
- Singapore Premier League: 2020

=== International ===
Singapore U22

- Merlion Cup: 2019
