= Ryang Hyon-ju =

North Korean footballer

Personal information
- Date of birth: 31 May 1998 (age 28)
- Place of birth: Hannō, Saitama, Japan
- Height: 1.73 m (5 ft 8 in)
- Position: Forward

Team information
- Current team: FC Jurong
- Number: 39

Youth career
- Vissel Kobe
- 2011–2013: Omiya Ardija
- 2014–2016: Tokyo Korean High School

College career
Years	Team	Apps	(Gls)
2017–2020	Waseda University		

Senior career*
Years	Team	Apps	(Gls)
2021–2022	FC Imabari	13	(1)
2022-2023	Tokyo Musashino United FC	26	(10)
2023–2026	Veertien Mie	25	(3)

International career^{‡}
2015	North Korea U17	3	(0)
2018–2020	North Korea U23	6	(1)
- * Club domestic league appearances and goals as of July 2026 ‡ National team caps and goals as of March 2021

- Ryang Hyon-ju
- Hangul: 량현주
- Hanja: 梁賢柱
- RR: Ryang Hyeonju
- MR: Ryang Hyŏnju

Ryang Hyon-ju (梁賢柱, Hyon-ju Ryang; Korean: 량현주; born 31 May 1998) is a professioal footballer who plays as a forward for FC Jurong. Born in Japan, he has represented North Korea at youth level.
