= Hijiyama University =

Coordinates: 34°25′43″N 132°28′31″E

- 比治山大学
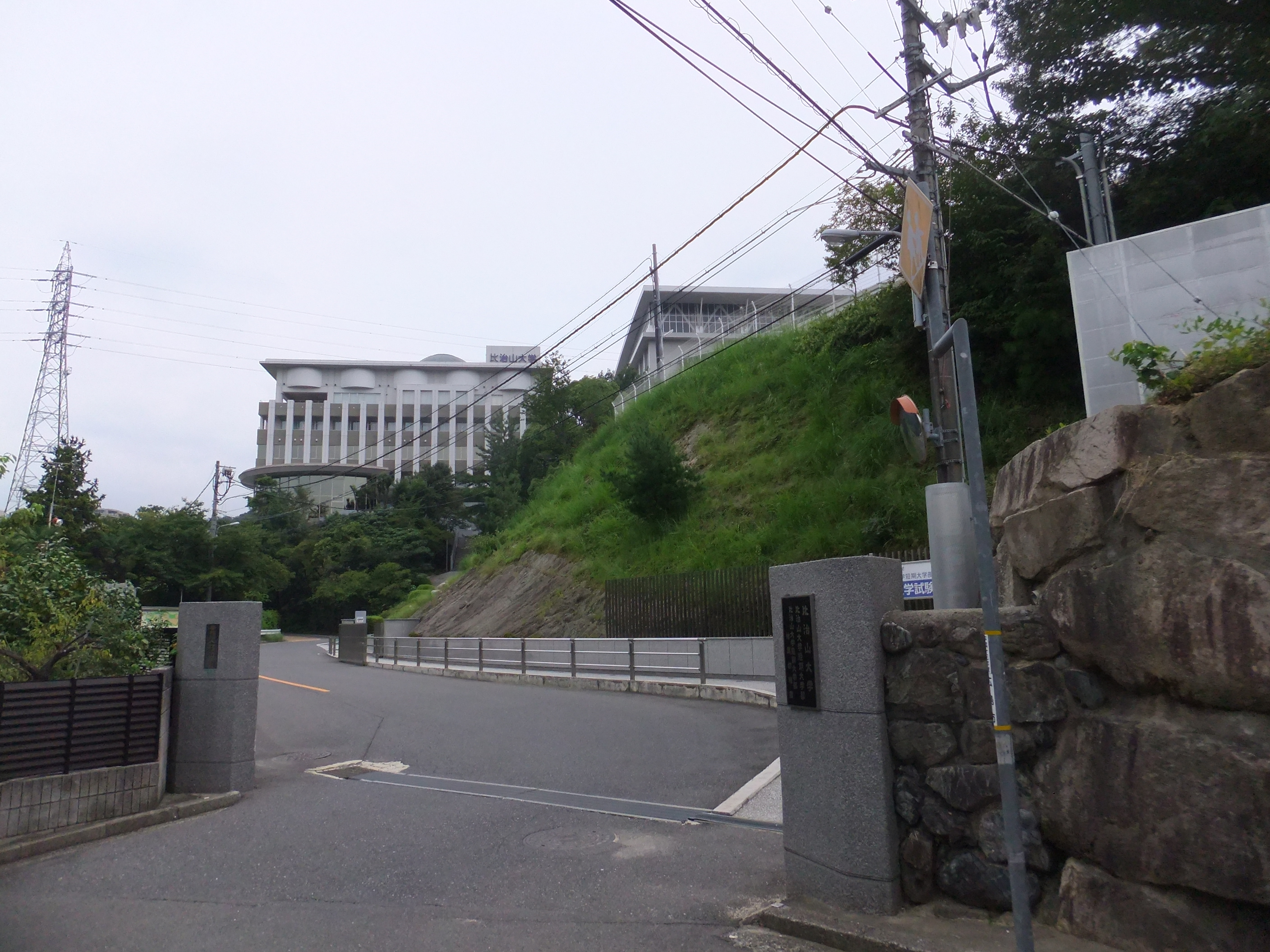
- Established: 1939
- Location: Hiroshima, Hiroshima, Japan

Hijiyama University (比治山大学, Hijiyama daigaku) is a private university in Hiroshima, Hiroshima, Japan. The predecessor of the school was established in 1939, and it was chartered as a university in 1994.
