= SteviaEgbus Mikuni =

Japanese footballer

Stevia Egbus Mikuni 三國 スティビアエブス
Personal information
- Full name: Stevia Egbus Mikuni
- Date of birth: 31 May 1998 (age 28)
- Place of birth: Higashimurayama, Tokyo, Japan
- Height: 1.82 m (6 ft 0 in)
- Positions: Centre-back; full-back

Youth career
- 2011–2013: Aomori Yamada Junior High School
- 2014–2016: Aomori Yamada High School
- 2020–2021: → Mito HollyHock (loan)

College career
Years	Team	Apps	(Gls)
2017–2020	Juntendo University		

Senior career*
Years	Team	Apps	(Gls)
2021–2022	Mito HollyHock	25	(0)
2022	→ FC Gifu (loan)	18	(0)
2023	FC Gifu	14	(0)
2024–2025	Albirex Niigata (S)	31	(1)
2025	Kasetsart	17	(0)
2026	Trat	13	(0)

International career^{‡}
2017	Japan U19	1	(0)
- * Club domestic league appearances and goals ‡ National team caps and goals as of 20 August 2020

Stevia Egbus Mikuni (三國 スティビアエブス, Mikuni SutiviaEbusu; born 31 May 1998) is a Japanese professional footballer who plays either as a centre-back or full-back. He is the older brother of fellow professional footballer Kennedy Egbus Mikuni.

== Career statistics ==
=== Club ===
As of 10 November 2020.

Club	Season	League			National cup		League cup		Other		Total	
Club	Season	Division	Apps	Goals	Apps	Goals	Apps	Goals	Apps	Goals	Apps	Goals
Mito HollyHock	2020	J2 League	4	0	0	0	0	0	0	0	4	0
Mito HollyHock	2021	J2 League	17	0	1	0	0	0	0	0	18	0
Mito HollyHock	2022	J2 League	4	0	1	0	0	0	0	0	5	0
Total			25	0	2	0	0	0	0	0	27	0
FC Gifu (loan)	2022	J3 League	4	0	0	0	0	0	0	0	4	0
FC Gifu	2023	J3 League	14	0	0	0	0	0	0	0	14	0
Total			18	0	0	0	0	0	0	0	18	0
Career total			43	0	2	0	0	0	0	0	45	0
