= Shingo Nakano =

Japanese footballer (born 2004)

Personal information
- Date of birth: 26 December 2004 (age 21)
- Place of birth: Tokyo, Japan
- Height: 1.80 m (5 ft 11 in)
- Position: Forward

Team information
- Current team: SCR Altach
- Number: 11

Youth career
- –2020: Sporting Club Shinagawa
- 2020–2022: Sano Nihon University High School

College career
Years	Team	Apps	(Gls)
2023–2024	El Camino Warriors		

Senior career*
Years	Team	Apps	(Gls)
2023	Setagaya United		
2024–2026	Albirex Niigata (S)	50	(44)
2026–	SCR Altach	0	(0)
- * Club domestic league appearances and goals as of 15 August 2026

Shingo Nakano (Japanese: 中埜信吾; born 26 December 2004) is a Japanese professional footballer who plays as a forward for Austrian Bundesliga club SCR Altach.

== Early life ==
Nakano was born on 26 December 2004. Born in Tokyo, Japan, he attended Sano Nihon University High School in Japan. Subsequently, he attended El Camino College in the United States.

== Club career ==
As a youth player, Nakano joined the youth academy of Japanese side Sporting Club Shinagawa. Following his stint there, he signed for Japanese side Setagaya United in 2023.

=== Albirex Niigata (S) ===
In May 2024, Nakano signed for Singaporean side Albirex Niigata (S). He scored a brace on his professional career debut in a 3–2 lost to Young Lions on 15 June. He then scored his first career hat-trick in a 7–2 win over Balestier Khalsa on 18 July. Regarded as a fan favorite while playing for the club, he was the club's top scorer for the 2024–25 season with 26 goals in 31 appearances.

On 12 September 2025, Nakano captained his side for the first time where he scored a brace in a 2–0 win over Geylang International. Shingo swept the accolades at the 2025–26 Singapore Premier League Awards Night, having been named Singapore Premier League Young Player of the Year, inducted into the Team of the Year, as well walking away with the SPL Golden Boot with 20 goals in 21 games.

=== SCR Altach ===
Following the conclusion if the 2025-26 season, Nakano joined Austrian Bundesliga club SCR Altach on a permanent transfer.

== Style of play ==
Nakano plays as a forward. Besides forward, he can play as a winger and is right-footed.
