= Keiji Shigetomi =

Japanese football manager (born 1979)

Personal information
- Date of birth: 10 June 1979 (age 47)
- Place of birth: Shimane, Japan
- Height: 1.70 m (5 ft 7 in)

Managerial career
- Years: Team
- 2005–2006: Hijiyama University
- 2018: Albirex Niigata (S) (assistant)
- 2018–2021: Albirex Niigata (S)
- 2022–2024: Albirex Niigata (S) (assistant)
- 2024–2025: Albirex Niigata (S) (interim)
- 2025–: Albirex Jurong (technical director)

Keiji Shigetomi (重富 計二, Shigetomi Keiji; born 10 June 1979) is a Japanese football coach, currently working as a technical director at Singapore Premier League club Albirex Jurong.

== Managerial career ==
Shigetomi was appointed manager of Albirex Niigata (S) for the 2018 season, following spells as a coach with Oshu Soccer Club and the Sanfrecce Hiroshima Soccer School. He was also head coach at Hijiyama University between 2005 and 2006, and spent the 2018 season as academy director at Albirex Niigata (S), after three seasons as manager of the club's youth sector.

In 2024, Shigetomi took over the role as head coach of Albirex Niigata (S) following the departure of Kazuaki Yoshinaga.

In 2026, Shigetomi received the Singapore Premier League Coach of the Year award, after guiding the team to a 3rd place finish. On 2 June 2026, Shigetomi vacate his managerial role to transition into the club technical director after the conclusion of the 2025–26 season.

== Honours ==
=== As manager ===
Albirex Niigata (S)

- Singapore Premier League: 2020

=== Individual ===
- Singapore Premier League Coach of the Year: 2025–26
