= 2023 Albirex Niigata Singapore FC season =

Albirex Niigata (S)
2023 season
- Chairman: Daisuke Korenaga
- Head coach: (Japan) Kazuaki Yoshinaga
- Stadium: Jurong East Stadium
- Premier League: 1st
- Singapore Cup: Group Stage
- Charity Shield: Winners
- Top goalscorer: League: Seia Kunori (21 goals); All: Seia Kunori (23 goals)

The 2023 season was Albirex Niigata Singapore FC's 20th consecutive season in the top flight of Singapore football and in the Singapore Premier League, having joined the league in 2004. Along with the 2023 Singapore Premier League, the club also competed in the Singapore Cup.

== Squad ==
=== SPL Squad ===
As of 6 Jan 2023

Squad No.	Name	Nationality	Date of birth (age)	Previous club	Contract start	Contract end
Goalkeepers
18	Hassan Sunny ^{O23}	(Singapore)	2 April 1984 (age 42)	(Singapore) Lion City Sailors	2023	2026
21	Hyrulnizam Juma'at ^{O23}	(Singapore)	14 November 1986 (age 40)	(Singapore) Warriors FC	2019	2023
31	Yoshihiko Kobayashi	(Japan)	7 February 2003 (age 23)	(United States) Southeastern Community College	2023	2023
Defenders
2	Ryo Takahashi	(Japan)	11 July 2000 (age 26)	(Japan) Toyo University	2023	2023
3	Keito Hariya	(Japan)	18 May 2003 (age 23)	(Japan) Funabashi Municipal HS	2022	2023
4	Koki Kawachi	(Japan)	10 May 2000 (age 26)	(Japan) Chukyo University	2023	2023
5	Shunsaku Kishimoto	(Japan)	14 June 2000 (age 26)	(Japan) Takushoku University	2023	2023
17	Sho Fuwa	(Japan)	2 October 2000 (age 26)	(Japan) Fukuoka University	2023	2023
Midfielders
6	Asahi Yokokawa	(Japan)	26 May 2002 (age 24)	(Japan) Tokyo Musashino United FC	2023	2023
7	Shuto Komaki	(Japan)	30 May 2000 (age 26)	(Japan) Kyushu Sangyo University	2023	2023
8	Kaisei Ogawa	(Japan)	25 February 2001 (age 25)	(Japan) Takushoku University	2023	2023
9	Riku Fukashiro	(Japan)	12 April 2000 (age 26)	(Japan) Takushoku University	2023	2023
13	Masaya Watanabe	(Japan) (Philippines)	1 March 2003 (age 23)	(Germany) TuRU Düsseldorf (G5)	2023	2023
14	Shodai Yokoyama	(Japan)	14 October 2000 (age 26)	(Japan) Osaka University (HSS)	2023	2023
26	Jarrel Ong Jia Wei	(Singapore) (China)	26 October 2002 (age 24)	(Singapore) Hougang United U21	2023	2023
27	Shakthi Vinayagavijayan	(Singapore)	28 May 2003 (age 23)	(Japan) Albirex Niigata U19	2022	2023
Strikers
10	Seia Kunori	(Japan)	31 March 2001 (age 25)	(Japan) Kansai University	2023	2023
11	Keito Komatsu	(Japan)	22 May 2000 (age 26)	(Japan) Tokoha University	2023	2023
19	Tadanari Lee ^{O23}	(Japan)	19 December 1985 (age 40)	(Japan) Kyoto Sanga	2022	2023
24	Zamani Zamri	(Singapore)	31 May 2001 (age 25)	(Singapore) Young Lions FC	2022	2023
Players who left club for NS during season
22	Nicky Melvin Singh	(Singapore) (Philippines)	13 June 2002 (age 24)	(Singapore) Tampines Rovers U19	2021	2023

== Coaching staff ==
Position	Name
Technical Director	(Japan) Kazuaki Yoshinaga
Team Manager (Men)	(Singapore) Dominic Wong
Team Manager (Women) & Assistant Coach (U15)	(Singapore) Tyrus Soo
Head Coach (Men)	(Japan) Kazuaki Yoshinaga
Head Coach (Women)	(Singapore) Nahar Daud
Head of Youth & U17 Head Coach	(Spain) Marcal Trulls
U19 Head Coach & Assistant Coach (Men)	(Singapore) Jaswinder Singh
Under-15 Head Coach & Fitness Coach (Men)	(Japan) Masayuki Kato
Assistant Coach (Men & U17)	(Japan) Keiji Shigetomi
Assistant Coach (U17)	(Japan) Kana Kitahara
Goalkeeper Coach (Men & U19)	(Singapore) Fadhil Salim
Goalkeeper Coach (U17 & U15)	(Singapore) Hyrulnizam Juma'at
Sports Trainer	(Japan) Tomoya Ueta
Physiotherapist	(Singapore) Karen Koh (Singapore) Alison Soh
Kitman	(Singapore) Roy Krishnan
Interpreter	(Japan) Ayumi Nagami

== Transfer ==
=== In ===
Preseason

Position	Player	Transferred from	Ref
GK	(Singapore) Hassan Sunny	(Singapore) Lion City Sailors	Free. 2 years contract till 2024
GK	(Singapore) Firman Nabil	(Singapore) Mattar City Sailors (SFL1)	Free. 1-year contract till 2023
GK	(Singapore) (Japan) Yoshihiko Kobayashi	(United States) Southeastern Community College	Free.
DF	(Japan) Shunsaku Kishimoto	(Japan) Takushoku University	Free
DF	(Japan) Sho Fuwa	(Japan) Fukuoka University	Free
DF	(Japan) Koki Kawachi	(Japan) Chukyo University	Free
DF	(Japan) Ryo Takahashi	(Japan) Toyo University	Free
MF	(Singapore) (China) Jarrel Ong	(Singapore) Hougang United U21	Free.
MF	(Japan) Shuto Komaki	(Japan) Kyushu Sangyo University	Free
MF	(Japan) Kaisei Ogawa	(Japan) Takushoku University	Free
MF	(Japan) Asahi Yokokawa	(Japan) Shonan Bellmare	Free
MF	(Japan) Shodai Yokoyama	(Japan) Osaka University (HSS)	Free
MF	(Japan) Riku Fukashiro	(Japan) Takushoku University	Free
MF	(Japan) Masaya Watanabe	(Germany) TuRU Düsseldorf (G5)	Free
FW	(Japan) Seia Kunori	(Japan) Kansai University	Free
FW	(Japan) Keito Komatsu	(Japan) Tokoha University	Free

Note 1: .

=== Loan In ===
Preseason

Position	Player	Transferred from	Ref

=== Loan Return ===
Preseason

Position	Player	Transferred To / From	Ref
DF	(Japan) Reo Kunimoto	(Japan) Renofa Yamaguchi FC (J2)	Loan Return

=== Out ===
Preseason

Position	Player	Transferred To	Team	Ref
GK	(Japan) Takahiro Koga	(Japan) SC Sagamihara (J3)	First Team	Free
DF	(Japan) Jun Kobayashi	(Singapore) Young Lions FC	First Team	Free
DF	(Japan) Tatsuya Sambongi	Free Agent	First Team	Free
DF	(Japan) Shogo Toyomura	(Japan) FC Nobeoka Agata (J5)	First Team	Free
DF	(Japan) Yoshiki Matsuura	Free Agent	First Team	Free
DF	(Japan) Daichi Omori	(Japan) Kataller Toyama (J3)	First Team	Free
MF	(Japan) Masahiro Sugita	(Singapore) Balestier Khalsa	First Team	Free
MF	(Japan) Kan Kobayashi	(Singapore) Young Lions FC	First Team	Free
MF	(Japan) Masaya Idetsu	Free Agent	First Team	Free
MF	(Japan) Kumpei Kakuta	(Japan) Fukuyama City (J5)	First Team	Free
MF	(Japan) Mahiro Takahashi	(Cambodia) Boeung Ket Angkor FC (C1)	First Team	Free
MF	(Japan) Kanato Fukazawa	Japan Soccer College (J5)	First Team	Free
MF	(Japan) Tsubasa Kawanishi	(Australia) Albion Rovers (A6)	First Team	Free
FW	(Japan) Shota Ochiai	Free Agent	First Team	Free
FW	(Japan) Satsuki Mori	Free Agent	First Team	Free
FW	(Japan) Kodai Tanaka	(Singapore) Lion City Sailors	First Team	Free
FW	(Singapore) Fikri Junaidi	Free Agent	First Team	Free
FW	(Singapore) Fairoz Hasan	(Singapore) Hougang United	First Team	Free
FW	(Singapore) Ilhan Fandi	(Belgium) Deinze (B2)	First Team	Free. Signed till June 2024

Mid-season

Position	Player	Transferred To	Team	Ref
GK	(Japan) (United States) (Singapore) Kai Yamamoto	(United States) Carnegie Mellon University	U21	Free

Postseason

Position	Player	Transferred To	Team	Ref
GK	(Singapore) Hyrulnizam Juma'at	Retired	First Team	N.A.
FW	(Japan) Tadanari Lee	Retired	First Team	N.A.

=== Loan Out ===
Position	Player	Transferred To	Ref
MF	(Singapore) (Philippines) Nicky Melvin Singh	(Singapore) SAFSA	NS till July 2025

=== Retained / Extension / Promoted ===
Position	Player	Ref
GK	(Singapore) Hyrulnizam Juma'at	1-year contract till 2023
DF	(Japan) Keito Hariya	1-year contract till 2023
DF	(Singapore) (Japan) Kenji Austin	1-year contract till 2023 (Promoted)
DF	(Singapore) (Japan) Junki Kenn Yoshimura	1-year contract till 2023 (Promoted)
MF	(Singapore) Shakthi Vinayagavijayan	1-year contract till 2023 (Promoted)
MF	(Singapore) (Philippines) Nicky Melvin Singh	1-year contract till 2023
MF	(Singapore) Hilman Norhisam	2 years contract till 2024
FW	(Singapore) Zamani Zamri	1-year contract till 2023
FW	(Japan) Tadanari Lee	1-year contract till 2023
GK	(Singapore) Hassan Sunny	2 years contract till 2026

== Friendly ==
=== Pre-season ===
Win Draw Loss

First Team

28 January 2023 1	Albirex Niigata (S) (Japan)	v	(Singapore) Lion City Sailors	Jalan Besar
	Hilman Norhisam			Stadium: Jalan Besar Stadium

3 February 2023 2	Albirex Niigata (S) (Japan)	3–2	(Singapore) Tampines Rovers	Jurong East
				Stadium: Jurong East Stadium

12 February 2023 3	Albirex Niigata (S) (Japan)	6–0	(Singapore) Balestier Khalsa	Jalan Besar
	Nicky Melvin Singh; Kaisei Ogawa; Riku Fukashiro; Seia Kunori; Asahi Yokokawa	Report		Stadium: Jalan Besar Stadium

U21

4 April 2023 1	Albirex Niigata (S) (Japan)	v	(Singapore) Lion City Sailors	Jalan Besar
	Hilman Norhisam			Stadium: Jalan Besar Stadium

=== Mid-season ===
First Team

17 June 2023 1	Johor Darul Ta'zim (Malaysia)	5–1	(Japan) Albirex Niigata (S)	Johor
	Diogo 18'; Fernando Forestieri 27'; Nazmi Faiz 53'; Bergson 64'; Aysar Hadi 67'		Seia Kunori 63'	Stadium: Sultan Ibrahim Stadium

14 October 2023 2	Balestier Khalsa (Singapore)	v	(Japan) Albirex Niigata (S)	Jalan Besar
				Stadium: Jalan Besar Stadium

=== In Season friendlies ===
Notes

== Team statistics ==
=== Appearances and goals ===
As at 26 Nov 2023

No.	Pos.	Player	SPL		Singapore Cup		Charity Shield		Total	
No.	Pos.	Player	Apps.	Goals	Apps.	Goals	Apps.	Goals	Apps.	Goals
2	DF	(Japan) Ryo Takahashi	9+9	2	2+2	0	1	0	23	2
3	DF	(Japan) Keito Hariya	6+7	0	0	0	0+1	0	14	0
4	DF	(Japan) Koki Kawachi	21	4	4	1	1	0	26	5
5	DF	(Japan) Shunsaku Kishimoto	24	2	3+1	1	1	0	29	3
6	MF	(Japan) Asahi Yokokawa	22	4	4	0	1	0	27	4
7	MF	(Japan) Shuto Komaki	20+4	8	2	0	1	0	27	8
8	MF	(Japan) Kaisei Ogawa	21+2	1	4	0	1	0	28	1
9	MF	(Japan) Riku Fukashiro	5+18	8	2+2	0	0+1	1	28	9
10	FW	(Japan) Seia Kunori	21+2	21	4	2	1	1	28	24
11	FW	(Japan) Keito Komatsu	2+18	13	2+2	0	0	0	24	13
13	MF	(Japan) Masaya Watanabe	1+14	0	0	0	0	0	15	0
14	MF	(Japan) Shodai Yokoyama	22+2	5	4	1	1	1	29	7
17	DF	(Japan) Sho Fuwa	21+1	1	4	0	1	0	27	1
18	GK	(Singapore) Hassan Sunny	19	0	4	0	1	0	24	0
19	FW	(Japan) Tadanari Lee	21+2	11	2+2	0	0+1	0	28	11
21	GK	(Singapore) Hyrulnizam Juma'at	2+3	0	0	0	0	0	5	0
24	FW	(Singapore) Zamani Zamri	0+2	0	0	0	0	0	2	0
26	MF	(Singapore) Jarrel Ong	0	0	0	0	0	0	0	0
27	FW	(Singapore) Shakthi Vinayagavijayan	1+6	0	0+1	0	0	0	8	0
52	DF	(Singapore) (Japan) Junki Kenn Yoshimura	17+1	1	4	0	0	0	22	1
53	MF	(Singapore) Hilman Norhisam	0+5	1	0	0	0	0	5	1
54	MF	(Singapore) (Japan) Kenji Austin	0+1	0	0	0	0	0	1	0
Players who have played this season but had left the club or on loan to other club
22	FW	(Singapore) Nicky Melvin Singh	6+3	1	0	0	1	0	10	1
51	GK	(Japan) (United States) (Singapore) Kai Yamamoto	3+1	0	0	0	0	0	4	0

== Competitions ==
=== Overview ===
Results summary (SPL)

Overall								Home						Away					
Pld	W	D	L	GF	GA	GD	Pts	W	D	L	GF	GA	GD	W	D	L	GF	GA	GD
24	20	2	2	86	20	+66	62	11	0	1	43	7	+36	9	2	1	43	13	+30

=== Charity Shield ===
19 February 2023 Charity Shield	Albirex Niigata (S) (Japan)	3–0	(Singapore) Hougang United	Jalan Besar
	Seia Kunori 57' (pen.); Shodai Yokoyama 72'; Riku Fukashiro 74' (yellow card) 90'; Nicky Melvin Singh (yellow card) 48'	Report	Brian Ferreira (yellow card) 41'; Nazrul Nazari (yellow card) 76'; Amy Recha (yellow card) 90+1'	Stadium: Jalan Besar Stadium; Referee: Jansen Foo

=== Singapore Premier League ===
Win Draw Loss

25 February 2023 1	Albirex Niigata (S) (Japan)	3–0	(Singapore) Young Lions FC	Jurong East
	Shuto Komaki 33'; Asahi Yokokawa 51'; Koki Kawachi 89'	Report	Aqil Yazid (yellow card) 11'; Elijah Lim Teck Yong (yellow card) 74'	Stadium: Jurong East Stadium; Referee: Taufik Thana

9 March 2023 2	Albirex Niigata (S) (Japan)	4–0	(Singapore) Lion City Sailors	Jurong East
	Lionel Tan 30' (o.g.); Ryo Takahashi 37'; Kaisei Ogawa 87'; Seia Kunori 89'; Nicky Melvin Singh (yellow card) 45'	Report	Anumanthan Kumar (red card) 15'; Arshad Shamim (yellow card) 85'	Stadium: Jurong East Stadium; Attendance: 1,695; Referee: Syarqawi Buhari

15 March 2023 3	Albirex Niigata (S) (Japan)	2–0	(Singapore) Hougang United	Jurong East
	Seia Kunori 45+1' 90+3'; Tadanari Lee (yellow card) 25'; Shuto Komaki (yellow card) 40'; Keito Komatsu (yellow card) 86'	Report		Stadium: Jurong East Stadium; Referee: Taufik Thana

19 March 2023 4	Albirex Niigata (S) (Japan)	0–1	(Singapore) Tampines Rovers	Jurong East
	Riku Fukashiro (yellow card) 74'; Tadanari Lee (yellow card) 87'	Report	Boris Kopitović 13'; Ong Yu En (yellow card) 58'; Shah Shahiran (yellow card) 87'	Stadium: Jurong East Stadium; Referee: Jansen Foo

1 April 2023 5	Geylang International (Singapore)	1–6	(Japan) Albirex Niigata (S)	Tampines
	Yushi Yamaya 18'; Joshua Pereira (yellow card) 62'	Report	Tadanari Lee 8'; Koki Kawachi 44'; Shuto Komaki 49'; Riku Fukashiro 55'; Keito Komatsu 57'; Seia Kunori 74'; Shunsaku Kishimoto (yellow card) 90'	Stadium: Our Tampines Hub; Referee: Clarence Leow

5 April 2023 6	Balestier Khalsa (Singapore)	1–6	(Japan) Albirex Niigata (S)	Toa Payoh
	Ignatius Ang 87'	Report	Seia Kunori 18' 45+1' 77'; Riku Fukashiro 31' 33'; Keito Komatsu 90+2'; Koki Kawachi (yellow card) 44'; Junki Kenn Yoshimura (yellow card) 79'	Stadium: Toa Payoh Stadium; Referee: Andrea Verolino

10 April 2023 7	Tanjong Pagar United (Singapore)	0–2	(Japan) Albirex Niigata (S)	Jurong East
	Raihan Rahman (yellow card) 35'; Marin Mudražija (yellow card) 90+4'	Report	Shodai Yokoyama 7'; Shuto Komaki 90'	Stadium: Jurong East Stadium; Referee: Jansen Foo

15 April 2023 8	Albirex Niigata (S) (Japan)	2–0	(Brunei) DPMM FC	Jurong East
	Riku Fukashiro 54'; Keito Komatsu 81'; Shuto Komaki (yellow card) 32'; Sho Fuwa (yellow card) 83'	Report	Abdul Azizi Ali Rahman (yellow card) 30'	Stadium: Jurong East Stadium; Referee: Clarence Leow Hong Wei

6 May 2023 9	Hougang United (Singapore)	0–5	(Japan) Albirex Niigata (S)	Jalan Besar
	Kazuma Takayama (yellow card) 17'; Hazzuwan Halim (yellow card) 82'	Report	Asahi Yokokawa 14' 33'; Koki Kawachi 26' 90+3'; Keito Komatsu 50'	Stadium: Jalan Besar Stadium; Referee: Farhad Mohamed

21 May 2023 10	Lion City Sailors (Singapore)	3–2	(Japan) Albirex Niigata (S)	Bishan
	Diego Lopes 49'; Shawal Anuar 53'; Abdul Rasaq 75'; Adam Swandi (yellow card) 62'; Hafiz Nor (yellow card) 90+2'	Report	Nur Adam Abdullah 13' (o.g.); Tadanari Lee 25'; Asahi Yokokawa (yellow card) 15'; Sho Fuwa (yellow card) 17'	Stadium: Bishan Stadium; Referee: Farhan Mohamed

26 May 2023 11	Albirex Niigata (S) (Japan)	6–2	(Singapore) Balestier Khalsa	Jurong East
	Seia Kunori 12' 21'; Shuto Komaki 30'; Tadanari Lee 51'; Sho Fuwa 53' (yellow card) 18'; Riku Fukashiro 90'; Asahi Yokokawa (yellow card) 37'; Koki Kawachi (yellow card) 45'	Report	Madhu Mohana 39'; Shuhei Hoshino 54'; Ryoya Tanigushi (yellow card) 59'	Stadium: Jurong East Stadium; Referee: Hilmi Fuad

6 June 2023 12	Albirex Niigata (S) (Japan)	3–0	(Singapore) Geylang International	Jurong East
	Shuto Komaki 21'; Seia Kunori 56'; Keito Komatsu 80'; Koki Kawachi (yellow card) 53' (yellow-red card) 86'; Asahi Yokokawa (yellow card) 79'	Report	Ahmad Syahir (yellow card) 40'; Iqbal Hussain (yellow card) 47'; Naufal Azman (yellow card) 81'; Fadli Kamis (yellow card) 90+3'	Stadium: Jurong East Stadium; Referee: Jansen Foo

11 June 2023 13	DPMM FC (Brunei)	0–2	(Japan) Albirex Niigata (S)	Jalan Besar
	Hanif Hamir (red card) 88'; Helmi Zambin (yellow card) 90+5'	Report	Tadanari Lee 41'; Shodai Yokoyama 46'; Seia Kunori (penalty missed) ^{89} Keito Hariya (yellow card) 77'	Stadium: Jalan Besar Stadium (Note: Hassanal Bolkiah National Stadium unavailable due to ongoing renovations.); Referee: Ahmad A'qashah

24 June 2023 14	Albirex Niigata (S) (Japan)	4–0	(Singapore) Tanjong Pagar United	Jurong East
	Koki Kawachi 10'; Shodai Yokoyama 45'; Seia Kunori 45+3' 88'; Nicky Melvin Singh (yellow card) 90+3'	Report	Shakir Hamzah (yellow card) 30'; Blake Ricciuto (yellow card) 62'; Khairul Hairie (yellow card) 90+2'	Stadium: Jurong East Stadium; Referee: Andrea Verolino

27 June 2023 15	Tampines Rovers (Singapore)	1–1	(Japan) Albirex Niigata (S)	Tampines
	Boris Kopitović 53' (pen.); Shah Shahiran (yellow card) 63'; Yasir Hanapi (yellow card) 90+4'	Report	Tadanari Lee 79'; Hassan Sunny (red card) 45+3'; Koki Kawachi (yellow card) 47'; Kaisei Ogawa (yellow card) 58'; Riku Fukashiro (yellow card) 89'	Stadium: Our Tampines Hub; Referee: Farhan Mohamed

1 July 2023 16	Young Lions FC (Singapore)	2–4	(Japan) Albirex Niigata (S)	Jalan Besar
	Ryu Hardy Yussri 64' (yellow card) 76'; Jun Kobayashi 90+5'; Harhys Stewart (yellow card) 29'; Kan Kobayashi (penalty missed) 90+4	Report	Koki Kawachi 3'; Nicky Melvin Singh 33'; Keito Komatsu 43'; Shodai Yokoyama 88'; Seia Kunori (yellow card) 86'	Stadium: Jalan Besar Stadium; Referee: Hilmi Fuad

8 July 2023 17 (Rescheduled)	DPMM FC (Brunei)	1–1	(Japan) Albirex Niigata (S)	Jalan Besar
	Abdul Azizi Ali Rahman 30'; Hakeme Yazid Said (yellow card) 75'; Kristijan Naumovski (yellow card) 90+2'; Farshad Noor (yellow card) 90+5'	Report	Keito Komatsu 50'; Shunsaku Kishimoto (yellow card) 90+2'	Stadium: Jalan Besar Stadium; Referee: Taufik Thana

16 July 2023 18	Albirex Niigata (S) (Japan)	3–1	(Singapore) Lion City Sailors	Jurong East
	Shodai Yokoyama 80'; Tadanari Lee 82'; Riku Fukashiro 90+5'	Report	Richairo Zivkovic 73' (pen.)	Stadium: Jurong East Stadium; Attendance: 2,497; Referee: Andrea Verolino; Man of the Match: Seia Kunori

22 July 2023 19	Albirex Niigata (S) (Japan)	5–0	(Singapore) Young Lions FC	Jurong East
	Keito Komatsu 6' 15' 23' (pen.); Hilman Norhisam 67'; Shunsaku Kishimoto 82'	Report	Aqil Yazid (yellow card) 31' (yellow-red card) 35'; Haziq Kamarudin (red card) 40'	Stadium: Jurong East Stadium; Referee: Hilmi Fuad; Man of the Match: Keito Komatsu

28 July 2023 20	Albirex Niigata (S) (Japan)	6–3	(Singapore) Tampines Rovers	Jurong East
	Seia Kunori 1' 4' (penalty missed) 8 Tadanari Lee 29'; Shunsaku Kishimoto 34'; Shodai Yokoyama (yellow card) 45+7'; Ryo Takahashi 82'; Keito Komatsu 83'	Report	Yasir Hanapi 19' (pen.) (yellow card) 60'; Ryaan Sanizal 26' (yellow card) 40'; Faris Ramli 69'	Stadium: Jurong East Stadium; Referee: Jansen Foo

3 August 2023 21	Geylang International (Singapore)	1–6	(Japan) Albirex Niigata (S)	Tampines
	Yushi Yamaya 83'	Report	Seia Kunori 40' 59' 79' 90+2'; Shuto Komaki 49'; Riku Fukashiro (yellow card) 77' (goal) 78'	Stadium: Our Tampines Hub; Referee: Taufik Thana

11 August 2023 22	Tanjong Pagar United (Singapore)	2–3	(Japan) Albirex Niigata (S)	Jurong East
	Marin Mudražija 68' 82'; Mirko Šugić (yellow card) 69'; Shahrin Saberin (yellow card) 90+4'	Report	Shuto Komaki 17'; Tadanari Lee 52'; Riku Fukashiro 76'; Ryo Takahashi (yellow card) 90+6'	Stadium: Jurong East Stadium; Referee: Syarqawi Buhari; Man of the Match: Shahrin Saberin

20 August 2023 23	Balestier Khalsa (Singapore)	1–5	(Japan) Albirex Niigata (S)	Bishan
	Jordan Emaviwe 16'; Irfan Mika'il (yellow card) 89'	Report	Seia Kunori 5'; Tadanari Lee 44'; Shuto Komaki 53'; Asahi Yokokawa 70'; Keito Komatsu 76'; Kaisei Ogawa (yellow card) 10'	Stadium: Bishan Stadium; Referee: Ahmad A'qashah; Man of the Match: Seia Kunori

16 September 2023 24 (Rescheduled)	Albirex Niigata (S) (Japan)	0–5	(Singapore) Hougang United	Jurong East
	Seia Kunori 12', 19'; Junki Kenn Yoshimura 44'; Tadanari Lee 49', 69'; Shuto Komaki (yellow card) 54'	Report	Nazrul Nazari (yellow card) 68'	Stadium: Jurong East Stadium; Referee: Ahmad A'qashah

Pos	Team	Pld	W	D	L	GF	GA	GD	Pts	Qualification or relegation
1	Albirex Niigata (S) (Note: Three clubs – Albirex Niigata (S), DPMM FC and the FAS under-23 team Young Lions, are ineligible for any AFC competition spots.) (C)	24	20	2	2	86	20	+66	62	
2	Lion City Sailors (Q)	24	17	3	4	79	39	+40	54	Qualification for 2024-25 AFC Champions League Two Group Stage & ASEAN Club Championship
3	Tampines Rovers (Q)	24	14	6	4	47	32	+15	48	Qualification for 2024-25 AFC Champions League Two Group Stage
4	Balestier Khalsa	24	12	0	12	60	71	−11	36	
5	Geylang International	24	10	3	11	41	52	−11	33	
6	Hougang United	24	9	2	13	37	57	−20	29	
7	Brunei DPMM	24	6	5	13	39	43	−4	23	
8	Tanjong Pagar United	24	6	3	15	39	62	−23	21	
9	Young Lions	24	1	2	21	24	76	−52	5	

Source: Singapore Premier League
Rules for classification: 1) points; 2) goal difference; 3) number of goals scored; 4) number of wins
(C) Champions; (Q) Qualified for the phase indicated

=== Singapore Cup ===
Pos	Team	Pld	W	D	L	GF	GA	GD	Pts	Qualification
1	Brunei DPMM (Q)	4	3	1	0	7	2	+5	10	Semi-finals
2	Tampines Rovers (Q)	4	2	1	1	9	3	+6	7	Semi-finals
3	Albirex Niigata (S)	4	1	2	1	5	4	+1	5	
4	Geylang International	4	1	0	3	6	12	−6	3	
5	Young Lions	4	1	0	3	4	10	−6	3	

Updated to match(es) played on 29 September 2023. Source: FAS
(Q) Qualified for the phase indicated

24 September 2023 Group Match 1	Brunei DPMM	1–1	(Japan) Albirex Niigata (S)	Jalan Besar
	Azwan Ali Rahman 13'; Ángel Martínez (yellow card) 33'	Report	Seia Kunori 57'	Stadium: Jalan Besar Stadium; Referee: Mohd Taqi

29 September 2023 Group Match 2	Albirex Niigata (S) (Japan)	1–2	(Singapore) Geylang International	Jurong East
	Shunsaku Kishimoto 74'	Report	Yushi Yamaya 45+1'; Naufal Azman 51'; Arshad Shamim (yellow card) 69'	Stadium: Jurong East Stadium; Referee: Syarqawi Buhari

22 October 2023 Group Match 3	Albirex Niigata (S) (Japan)	2–0	(Singapore) Young Lions FC	Jurong East
	Seia Kunori 37'; Shodai Yokoyama 75'	Report		Stadium: Jurong East Stadium; Referee: Ahmad A'qashah

26 November 2023 Group Match 4	Albirex Niigata (S) (Japan)	1–1	(Singapore) Tampines Rovers	Jurong East
	Koki Kawachi 68'; Tadanari Lee (yellow card) 73'; Ryo Takahashi (yellow card) 83'	Report	Boris Kopitović 79' (pen.) (yellow card) 83'	Stadium: Jurong East Stadium; Referee: Ahmad A'qashah
