= 2023 Balestier Khalsa FC season =

Balestier Khalsa
2023 season
- Chairman: S Thavaneson
- Head coach: Peter De Roo
- Stadium: Bishan Stadium
Home colours	Away colours

The 2023 season was Balestier Khalsa's 28th consecutive season in the top flight of Singapore football and in the Singapore Premier League and the Singapore Cup.

== Squad ==
=== Singapore Premier League ===
As of 4 January 2022

No.	Name	Nationality	Date of birth (age)	Previous club	Contract since	Contract end
Goalkeepers
1	Hairul Syirhan	(Singapore)	21 August 1995 (age 31)	(Singapore) Geylang International	2022	2023
21	Mukundan Maran	(Singapore)	21 July 1998 (age 28)	(Singapore) Hougang United	2023	2024
22	Wayne Chew ^{U23}	(Singapore)	22 October 2001 (age 25)	(Singapore) Young Lions FC	2023	2023
Defenders
2	Darren Teh	(Singapore)	9 September 1996 (age 30)	(Singapore) Geylang International	2022	2026
4	Syabil Hisham ^{U23}	(Singapore)	20 September 2002 (age 24)	(Singapore) Young Lions FC	2023	2023
5	Emmeric Ong ^{O30}	(Singapore)	25 January 1991 (age 35)	(Singapore) Tanjong Pagar United	2023	2025
6	Madhu Mohana ^{O30}	(Singapore)	6 March 1991 (age 35)	(Singapore) Tampines Rovers	2022	2023
11	Iqram Rifqi	(Singapore)	25 February 1996 (age 30)	(Singapore) Lion City Sailors	2023	2023
12	Fabian Kwok ^{O30}	(Singapore)	17 March 1989 (age 37)	(Singapore) Hougang United	2023	2023
13	Amer Hakeem	(Singapore)	8 November 1998 (age 28)	(Singapore) Young Lions FC	2021	2023
17	Jordan Emaviwe ^{U23}	(Singapore) (Nigeria)	9 April 2001 (age 25)	(Singapore) Young Lions FC	2020	2023
20	Fudhil I’yadh ^{U23}	(Singapore)	18 August 2001 (age 25)	(Singapore) Lion City Sailors U21	2023	2026
23	Syukri Noorhaizam	(Singapore)	14 December 1999 (age 26)	(Singapore) Tiong Bahru FC (NFL)	2020	2025
29	Aidil Johari ^{U23}	(Singapore)	5 April 2003 (age 23)	Youth Team	2021	2023
	Sameer Alassane ^{U23}	(Singapore) (Mali)	24 December 2000 (age 25)	Youth Team	2023	2024
Midfielders
8	Alen Kozar	(Slovenia)	7 April 1995 (age 31)	(Slovenia) NŠ Mura	2023	2023
15	Lewis Lee Chih Yuan ^{U23}	(Singapore)	21 October 2005 (age 21)	Youth Team	2022	2023
18	Masahiro Sugita	(Japan)	24 November 1999 (age 26)	(Japan) Albirex Niigata (S)	2023	2023
24	Ho Wai Loon	(Singapore)	20 August 1993 (age 33)	(Singapore) Lion City Sailors	2021	2023
30	Ignatius Ang ^{O30}	(Singapore)	12 November 1992 (age 34)	(Singapore) Tanjong Pagar United	2022	2025
49	Elijah Lim Teck Yong ^{U23}	(Singapore)	8 May 2001 (age 25)	(Singapore) Young Lions FC	2023	2024
Forwards
7	Daniel Goh	(Singapore)	13 August 1999 (age 27)	(Singapore) Young Lions FC	2022	2023
9	Shuhei Hoshino	(Japan)	19 December 1995 (age 30)	(South Korea) Busan Transportation CFC	2020	2023
10	Ryoya Tanigushi	(Japan)	31 August 1999 (age 27)	(Japan) Albirex Niigata (S)	2022	2023
19	Puvan Raj Sivalingam ^{U23}	(Singapore)	29 August 2001 (age 25)	Youth Team	2020	2023
Players who left during season on loan
12	Martyn Mun ^{U23}	(Singapore)	7 January 2000 (age 26)	(Singapore) Young Lions FC	2020	2022
66	Ryan Praveen ^{U21}	(Singapore)	28 May 2002 (age 24)	Youth Team	2020	2022

== Coaching staff ==
Position	Name	Ref.
Team Manager	(Singapore) Darwin Jalil	
General Manager	Tim Nee Cheng	
Head Coach	(Netherlands) Peter de Roo	
Head Coach (Women)	(Singapore) Ratna Suffian	
Assistant Coach & Performance Analyst	(Singapore) Razif Ariff	
Assistant Coach & U17 Coach	(Singapore) Abdul Musawir	
Head of Youth & U15 Coach	(Singapore) Firdaus Salleh	
U21 Coach	(Singapore) Indra Sahdan (Singapore) Haris Sumri (Singapore) Sheikh Abdul Hadi	
Goalkeeping Coach	(Singapore) Yazid Yasin	
Physiotherapist	(Singapore) Danial Feriza	
Kitman	(Singapore) Abdul Latiff	

== Transfer ==
=== In ===
Pre-Season

Position	Player	Transferred From	Team	Ref
GK	(Singapore) Mukundan Maran	(Singapore) Hougang United	First Team	Free. 2 years contract till 2024
GK	(Singapore) Efan Qiszman	(Singapore) Sailors Development Centre	U21	Free
DF	(Singapore) Iqram Rifqi	(Singapore) Lion City Sailors	First Team	Free
DF	(Singapore) Fudhil I'yadh	(Singapore) Lion City Sailors U21	First Team	Free
DF	(Singapore) Emmeric Ong	(Singapore) Tanjong Pagar United	First Team	Free
DF	(Singapore) (Nigeria) Jordan Emaviwe	(Singapore) SAFSA	First Team	End of NS
DF	(Singapore) Syabil Hisham	(Singapore) Young Lions FC	First Team	Free
DF	(Singapore) Bradly Yap Zhi Hao	(Singapore) Sailors Development Centre	U21	Free
DF	(Singapore) Merrick Tan Yi Ern	(Singapore) Sailors Development Centre	U21	Free
MF	(Slovenia) Alen Kozar	(Slovenia) NŠ Mura	First Team	Undisclosed
MF	(Japan) Masahiro Sugita	(Japan) Albirex Niigata (S)	First Team	Free
MF	(Singapore) Fabian Kwok	(Singapore) Hougang United	First Team	Free
MF	(Singapore) (England) (Iran) Kian Ghadessy	(Singapore) Tanjong Pagar United U21	U21	Free
MF	(Singapore) Sahoo Garv	(Singapore) Sailors Development Centre	U21	Free
FW	(Singapore) (England) Max McCoy	(England) Weymouth F.C. (E6)	U21	Free
FW	(Singapore) Ryan Peh Jun Wen	(Singapore) Sailors Development Centre	U21	Free

Mid-Season

Position	Player	Transferred From	Team	Ref
GK	(Singapore) Wayne Chew	(Singapore) Geylang International	First Team	Free
MF	(Singapore) Elijah Lim Teck Yong	(Singapore) Geylang International	First Team	Free

=== Loan In ===
Pre-Season

Position	Player	Transferred From	Ref

=== Out ===
Pre-Season

Position	Player	Transferred To	Team	Ref
GK	(Singapore) (Japan) Kimura Riki	(Singapore) Tanjong Pagar United	First Team	Free
GK	(Singapore) Rudy Khairullah	(Singapore) Lion City Sailors	First Team	Loan Return
DF	(Serbia) Ensar Brunčević	(Serbia) FK Novi Pazar	First Team	Free. 2 years contracts.
DF	(Singapore) Aiman Zavyan	Retired	First Team	
DF	(Singapore) Khalili Khalif	(Singapore)	First Team	
DF	(Singapore) Keshav Kumar	(Singapore) Young Lions FC	First Team	
DF	(Singapore) Delwinder Singh	(Singapore) Geylang International	First Team	
DF	(Singapore) Akmal Azman	(Singapore) Geylang International	First Team	Free
DF	(Singapore) Aqil Yazid	(Singapore) Young Lions FC	U21	Free
MF	(Singapore) Naufal Azman	(Singapore) Geylang International	First Team	Free
MF	(Singapore) Gareth Low	(Singapore) Geylang International	First Team	Free
MF	(Singapore) Hariysh Krishnakumar	(Singapore) Hougang United U21	First Team	
MF	(Singapore) Aarish Kumar	Singapore Cricket Club (SFL1)	First Team	
MF	(Singapore) Ammirul Emmran	Singapore Football Club	First Team	Free
MF	(Singapore) Asshukrie Wahid	(Singapore) Bishan Barx (SFL2)	First Team	Free
FW	(Japan) Kuraba Kondo	(Japan) FC Tokushima	First Team	Free

Mid-Season

Position	Player	Transferred To	Team	Ref
MF	(United States) (Scotland) (Philippines) Connar Mackay	(United States) Bentley University	U21	Free

=== Loan Return ===
Mid-Season

Position	Player	Transferred From	Team	Ref
DF	(Singapore) (Nigeria) Jordan Emaviwe	(Singapore) Young Lions FC	First Team	Loan Return
DF	(Singapore) (Mali) Sameer Alassane	(Singapore) Police SA	First Team	Loan Return; 6 months contract from Oct 2023 till April 2024

=== Loan Out ===
Pre-Season

Position	Player	Transferred To	Team	Ref
DF	(Singapore) (Mali) Sameer Alassane	(Singapore) Police SA	U21	NS till Oct 2023
GK	(Singapore) Martyn Mun	(Singapore)	U21	NS till 2024
FW	(Singapore) N. Sakthivelchezhian	(Singapore) SAFSA	U21	NS till Dec 2024
FW	(Singapore) Ryan Praveen	(Singapore) SAFSA	U21	NS till Jan 2025
MF	(Singapore) (Nigeria) Jordan Emaviwe	(Singapore) Young Lions	First Team	Season loan (Note: Jordan Emaviwe returns to the club after the SEA Games conclusion.)

Mid-Season

Position	Player	Transferred To	Ref

=== Extension / Retained ===
Position	Player	Ref
GK	(Singapore) Hairul Syirhan	1-year contract from 2022 till 2023
DF	(Singapore) Darren Teh	2.5 years contract from Jan 2024 till Jun 2026
DF	(Singapore) Fudhil I’yadh	2.5 years contract from Jan 2024 till Jun 2026
DF	(Singapore) Syukri Noorhaizam	1.5 years contract from Jan 2024 till Jun 2025
DF	(Singapore) Emmeric Ong	1.5 years contract from Jan 2024 till Jun 2025
DF	(Singapore) Irfan Mika'il Abdullah	1.5 years contract from Jan 2024 till Jun 2025
DF	(Singapore) Ho Wai Loon	2 years contract from 2021 till 2023
DF	(Singapore) Madhu Mohana	1-year contract from 2022 till 2023
DF	(Singapore) Aidil Johari	1-year contract from 2022 till 2023
DF	(Singapore) Amer Hakeem	1-year contract from 2022 till 2023
MF	(Singapore) Ignatius Ang	1.5 years contract from Jan 2024 till Jun 2025
MF	(Singapore) Elijah Lim Teck Yong	1.5 years contract from Jan 2024 till Jun 2025
MF	(Japan) Ryoya Tanigushi	1-year contract from 2022 till 2023
FW	(Singapore) Puvan Raj Sivalingam	1-year contract from 2022 till 2023
FW	(Japan) Shuhei Hoshino	1-year contract from 2022 till 2023

== Friendly ==
Win Draw Loss

First Team

27 January 2023 1	Tampines Rovers (Singapore)	3–2	(Singapore) Balestier Khalsa	Tampines
				Stadium: Our Tampines Hub

12 February 2023 2	Albirex Niigata (S) (Japan)	6–0	(Singapore) Balestier Khalsa	Jalan Besar
	Nicky Melvin Singh; Kaisei Ogawa; Riku Fukashiro; Seia Kunori; Asahi Yokokawa	Report		Stadium: Jalan Besar Stadium

18 February 2023 3	Balestier Khalsa (Singapore)	v	(Singapore) Tanjong Pagar United	Bishan
				Stadium: Bishan Stadium

2 April 2023 4	Project Vaults (Singapore)	v	(Singapore) Balestier Khalsa	Jalan Besar
				Stadium: Jalan Besar Stadium

14 October 2023 5	Balestier Khalsa (Singapore)	v	(Japan) Albirex Niigata (S)	Jalan Besar
				Stadium: Jalan Besar Stadium

2023 Malaysia Tour (31 January – 4 February)

1 February 2023 1	Balestier Khalsa (Singapore)	2–4	(Malaysia) Selangor U23 (M2)	Shah Alam
				Stadium: FA Selangor Training Centre

4 February 2023 2	Balestier Khalsa (Singapore)	6–0	(Malaysia) Armed Forces FC (M3)	Selangor
				Stadium: MINDEF stadium

== Team statistics ==
=== Appearances and goals ===
As of 25 Nov 2023

Numbers in parentheses denote appearances as substitute.

No.	Pos.	Player	SPL		Singapore Cup		Total	
No.	Pos.	Player	Apps.	Goals	Apps.	Goals	Apps.	Goals
1	GK	(Singapore) Hairul Syirhan	24	0	3	0	27	0
2	DF	(Singapore) Darren Teh	24	0	3	0	27	0
4	DF	(Singapore) Syabil Hisham	0+1	0	0	0	1	0
5	DF	(Singapore) Emmeric Ong	6+6	0	0+1	0	13	0
6	DF	(Singapore) Madhu Mohana	21	3	3	0	24	3
7	FW	(Singapore) Daniel Goh	24	7	2	1	26	8
8	MF	(Slovenia) Alen Kozar	22	2	2	2	24	4
9	FW	(Japan) Shuhei Hoshino	22	11	3	5	25	16
10	MF	(Japan) Ryoya Tanigushi	24	23	3	1	27	24
11	DF	(Singapore) Iqram Rifqi	2+8	0	1+1	0	12	0
12	DF	(Singapore) Fabian Kwok	8+2	1	2+1	0	13	1
13	DF	(Singapore) Amer Hakeem	2+2	0	0	0	4	0
17	DF	(Singapore) (Nigeria) Jordan Emaviwe	8+1	1	3	0	12	1
18	MF	(Japan) Masahiro Sugita	19	5	3	0	22	5
19	FW	(Singapore) Puvan Raj	0+1	0	0	0	1	0
20	DF	(Singapore) Fudhil I'yadh	23+1	0	1	0	25	0
21	GK	(Singapore) Mukundan Maran	0	0	0	0	0	0
22	GK	(Singapore) Wayne Chew	0	0	0+1	0	1	0
23	DF	(Singapore) Syukri Noorhaizam	0+15	1	0+1	0	16	1
24	DF	(Singapore) Ho Wai Loon	23	4	1	0	24	4
29	DF	(Singapore) Aidil Johari	1	0	0	0	1	0
30	MF	(Singapore) Ignatius Ang	7+13	1	3	0	23	1
49	MF	(Singapore) Elijah Lim Teck Yong	0	0	0+1	0	1	0
51	MF	(Singapore) (Iran) (England) Kian Ghadessy	0+8	0	0	0	8	0
61	MF	(Singapore) Garv Sahoo	0+1	0	0	0	1	0
65	DF	(Singapore) Irfan Mika'il	0+1	0	0	0	1	0
72	FW	(England) (Singapore) Max McCoy	4+2	0	0	0	6	0
Players who have played this season but had left the club or on loan to other club

== Competitions (SPL) ==
=== Overview ===
Competition	Record							
Competition	P	W	D	L	GF	GA	GD	Win %

=== Singapore Premier League ===
Win Draw Loss

26 February 2023 1	Balestier Khalsa (Singapore)	2–3	(Singapore) Hougang United	Bishan
	Daniel Goh 60' (yellow card) 18'; Ryoya Tanigushi 73'	Report	Kristijan Krajcek 22'; Kazuma Takayama 50'; Amy Recha 87' (yellow card) 29'; Nazrul Nazari (yellow card) 83'	Stadium: Bishan Stadium; Referee: Mohd Taqi

4 March 2023 2	Balestier Khalsa (Singapore)	3–1	(Singapore) Young Lions FC	Bishan
	Shuhei Hoshino 6'; Ho Wai Loon 32' 46'	Report	Jordan Emaviwe 90+10' (pen.); Harith Kanadi (yellow card) 45+3'; Jared Gallagher (yellow card) 50'; Amir Syafiz (yellow card) 77'	Stadium: Bishan Stadium; Referee: Hilmi Faud

10 March 2023 3	DPMM FC (Brunei)	3–4	(Singapore) Balestier Khalsa	Jalan Besar
	Andrey Varankow 5'; Azwan Ali Rahman 7' (yellow card) 80'; Ho Wai Loon 45+2' (o.g.); Hendra Azam Idris (yellow card) 35'; Hanif Hamir (yellow card) 41'; Yura Indera Putera Yunos (red card) 55'; Josip Balić (yellow card) 64'; Syafiq Hilmi Shahrom (yellow card) 82'; Najib Tarif (yellow card) 86'; Hanif Farhan Azman (yellow card) 90+8'	Report	Ryoya Tanigushi 18' 64' 90+10'; Alen Kozar 55' (pen.) (yellow card) 79'; Ho Wai Loon (yellow card) 27'	Stadium: Jalan Besar Stadium (Note: DPMM stadium under renovation and not available); Referee: Jansen Foo

14 March 2023 4	Balestier Khalsa (Singapore)	1–3	(Singapore) Tampines Rovers	Bishan
	Daniel Goh 49'; Emmeric Ong (yellow card) 77'	Report	Faris Ramli 29'; Boris Kopitović 31' 77'; Yasir Hanapi (yellow card) 36'; Miloš Zlatković (yellow card) 38'; Syazwan Buhari (yellow card) 40'; Kyoga Nakamura (yellow card) 80'	Stadium: Bishan Stadium; Referee: Clarence Leow

18 March 2023 5	Lion City Sailors (Singapore)	3–0	(Singapore) Balestier Khalsa	Bishan
	Maxime Lestienne 19' 90+2' (pen.); Abdul Rasaq 48'; Christopher van Huizen (yellow card) 5'	Report	Madhu Mohana (yellow card) 30'	Stadium: Bishan Stadium; Referee: Hilmi Faud

5 April 2023 6	Balestier Khalsa (Singapore)	1–6	(Japan) Albirex Niigata (S)	Toa Payoh
	Ignatius Ang 87'	Report	Seia Kunori 18' 45+1' 77'; Riku Fukashiro 31' 33'; Keito Komatsu 90+2'; Koki Kawachi (yellow card) 44'; Junki Kenn Yoshimura (yellow card) 79'	Stadium: Toa Payoh Stadium; Referee: Andrea Verolino

8 April 2023 7	Young Lions FC (Singapore)	1–3	(Singapore) Balestier Khalsa	Jalan Besar
	Kan Kobayashi 10'; Aqil Yazid (yellow card) 18'; Harith Kanadi (yellow card) 32' (yellow-red card) 36'	Report	Ryoya Tanigushi 16' 86'; Daniel Goh 23'; Fudhil I'yadh (yellow card) 36'; Madhu Mohana (yellow card) 47'; Iqram Rifqi (yellow card) 48'; Fabian Kwok (yellow card) 76'; Syukri Noorhaizam (yellow card) 79'	Stadium: Jalan Besar Stadium; Referee: Jansen Foo

12 April 2023 8 (Rescheduled)	Geylang International (Singapore)	3–0	(Singapore) Balestier Khalsa	Jalan Besar
	Iqbal Hussain 32' (yellow card) 42'; Yushi Yamaya 40'; Gareth Low 77'; Sham Mohamed (yellow card) 19'; Fadli Kamis (yellow card) 34'; Gareth Low (yellow card) 52'	Report	Ho Wai Loon (yellow card) 51'	Stadium: Jalan Besar Stadium (Note: OTH not available due to unplayable field); Referee: Farhad Mohamed

16 April 2023 9	Tanjong Pagar United (Singapore)	2–4	(Singapore) Balestier Khalsa	Jurong East
	Tajeli Salamat 10'; Shakir Hamzah 15'	Report	Ho Wai Loon 10'; Masahiro Sugita 17'; Ryoya Taniguchi 23' 60'	Stadium: Jurong East Stadium; Referee: Ahmad A'qashah

5 May 2023 10	Tampines Rovers (Singapore)	2–3	(Singapore) Balestier Khalsa	Tampines
	Boris Kopitović 67' (pen.) 90+9' (pen.); Faris Ramli (yellow card) 7'; Syed Firdaus Hassan (yellow card) 90+2'	Report	Daniel Goh 33'; Ryoya Tanigushi 51' 90+6'; Fabian Kwok (yellow card) 80'; Madhu Mohana (yellow card) 90+8'	Stadium: Our Tampines Hub; Referee: Taufik Tahana

20 May 2023 11	Balestier Khalsa (Singapore)	3–2	(Brunei) DPMM FC	Toa Payoh
	Shuhei Hoshino 30' (yellow card) 52'; Daniel Goh 49' (yellow card) 36'; Masahiro Sugita 55'; Amer Hakeem (yellow card) 8'	Report	Hakeme Yazid Said 46' 71'; Hanif Farhan Azman (yellow card) 38'; Ángel Martínez (yellow card) 75'; Yura Indera Putera Yunos (yellow card) 90+1'	Stadium: Toa Payoh Stadium; Referee: Mohd Taqi

26 May 2023 12	Albirex Niigata (S) (Japan)	6–2	(Singapore) Balestier Khalsa	Jurong East
	Seia Kunori 12' 21'; Shuto Komaki 30'; Tadanari Lee 51'; Sho Fuwa 53' (yellow card) 18'; Riku Fukashiro 90'; Asahi Yokokawa (yellow card) 37'; Koki Kawachi (yellow card) 45'	Report	Madhu Mohana 39'; Shuhei Hoshino 54'; Ryoya Tanigushi (yellow card) 59'	Stadium: Jurong East Stadium; Referee: Hilmi Fuad

1 June 2023 13	Balestier Khalsa (Singapore)	4–5	(Singapore) Lion City Sailors	Bishan
	Fabian Kwok 21'; Ryoya Tanigushi 66' 86' (pen.); Shuhei Hoshino 82'; Alen Kozar (yellow card) 63'; Daniel Goh (yellow card) 87'	Report	Shawal Anuar 19' 55'; Maxime Lestienne 38' 76'; Diego Lopes 40' (yellow card) 44'; Nur Adam Abdullah (yellow card) 2'; Adam Swandi (yellow card) 10'; Hami Syahin (yellow card) 87'; Bernie Ibini-Isei (yellow card) 90+8'	Stadium: Bishan Stadium; Referee: Ahmad A'qashah

11 June 2023 14	Balestier Khalsa (Singapore)	4–3	(Singapore) Tanjong Pagar United	Bishan
	Shuhei Hoshino 31' 54'; Ryoya Tanigushi 37' (pen.) 85'	Report	Marin Mudražija 63' (pen.) (yellow card) 45'; Blake Ricciuto 67'; Syukri Bashir 73'; Faizal Roslan (yellow card) 28' (yellow-red card) 81'; Tajeli Salamat (yellow card) 36'; Fathullah Rahmat (yellow card) 45+4'; Mirko Šugić (yellow card) 52'; Azim Akbar (yellow card) 90+2'	Stadium: Bishan Stadium; Referee: Farhad Mohamed

23 June 2023 15	Balestier Khalsa (Singapore)	2–3	(Singapore) Geylang International	Bishan
	Ho Wai Loon 35' (yellow card) 44'; Masahiro Sugita 83'; Alen Kozar (yellow card) 30'; Fudhil I'yadh (yellow card) 76'	Report	Yushi Yamaya 47'; Vincent Bezecourt 55'; Shahfiq Ghani 79'; Danish Irfan (yellow card) 33' (yellow-red card) 61'	Stadium: Bishan Stadium; Referee: Syarqawi Buhari

2 July 2023 16	Hougang United (Singapore)	1–3	(Singapore) Balestier Khalsa	Jalan Besar
	Hazzuwan Halim 90+5'; Irwan Shah (yellow card) 36'; Amir Zailani (yellow card) 44'; Jordan Vestering (yellow card) 47'; Umar Ramle (yellow card) 64'; Dorde Maksimovic (yellow card) 71'	Report	Ryoya Tanigushi 49'; Madhu Mohana 54'; Masahiro Sugita 90'; Ho Wai Loon (yellow card) 40'	Stadium: Jalan Besar Stadium; Referee: Andrea Verolino

6 July 2023 17	Tanjong Pagar United (Singapore)	2–3	(Singapore) Balestier Khalsa	Jurong East
	Blake Ricciuto 45+1'; Marin Mudrazija 49' (pen.); Naqiuddin Eunos (yellow card) 40'; Raihan Rahman (yellow card) 72'; Akram Azman (yellow card) 74'	Report	Ryoya Tanigushi 27' (pen.); Madhu Mohana 69' (yellow card) 39'; Daniel Goh 75' (yellow card) 10' (yellow-red card) 78'; Jordan Emaviwe (yellow card) 60'	Stadium: Jurong East Stadium; Referee: Jansen Foo

12 July 2023 18	Balestier Khalsa (Singapore)	4–2	(Singapore) Young Lions FC	Bishan
	Shuhei Hoshino 33'; Ryoya Tanigushi 65' 82'; Alen Kozar 71'	Report	Haziq Kamarudin 48'; Amiruldin Asraf 90+5'; Harhys Stewart (yellow card) 16'; Jared Gallagher (yellow card) 72'	Stadium: Bishan Stadium; Referee: Taufik Thana

16 July 2023 19	DPMM FC (Brunei)	2–3	(Singapore) Balestier Khalsa	Jalan Besar
	Azwan Ali Rahman 7'; Hakeme Yazid Said 17'; Hanif Farhan Azman (yellow card) 32'; Yura Indera Putera Yunos (yellow card) 72' (yellow-red card) 90'; Najib Tarif (yellow card) 88'; Hendra Azam Idris (yellow card) 90+3'	Report	Shuhei Hoshino 2'; Ryoya Tanigushi 32' (pen.) 88' (penalty missed) 87; Fudhil I'yadh (yellow card) 64'	Stadium: Jalan Besar Stadium (Note: DPMM stadium under renovation and not available); Referee: Hilmi Fuad

21 July 2023 20	Balestier Khalsa (Singapore)	1–3	(Singapore) Hougang United	Bishan
	Shuhei Hoshino 19'; Ho Wai Loon (yellow card) 90+1'	Report	Djordje Maksimovic 53'; Kristijan Krajcek 74' 86' (yellow card) 71'; Irwan Shah (yellow card) 43'; Abdil Qaiyyim Mutalib (yellow card) 90+2'	Stadium: Bishan Stadium; Referee: Taufik Thana; Man of the Match: Kristijan Krajcek

31 July 2023 21 (Rescheduled)	Lion City Sailors (Singapore)	5–2	(Singapore) Balestier Khalsa	Bishan
	Richairo Zivkovic (penalty missed) 11 24'; Lionel Tan 35'; Bailey Wright 47' 74' (yellow card) 15'; Shawal Anuar 61'	Report	Ryoya Tanigushi (penalty missed) 17 27' (pen.); Shuhei Hoshino 60'	Stadium: Bishan Stadium; Referee: Hilmi Fuad; Man of the Match: Bailey Wright

12 August 2023 22	Geylang International (Singapore)	2–6	(Singapore) Balestier Khalsa	Tampines
	Iqbal Hussain 22' 68'; Ahmad Syahir (red card) 64'; Syed Azmi (yellow card) 66'; Naufal Azman (red card) 73'	Report	Daniel Goh 4'; Shuhei Hoshino 29'; Joshua Pereira 45+2' (o.g.); Syukri Noorhaizam 75'; Masahiro Sugita 82'; Ryoya Tanigushi 86'	Stadium: Our Tampines Hub; Referee: Jansen Foo

20 August 2023 23	Balestier Khalsa (Singapore)	1–5	(Japan) Albirex Niigata (S)	Bishan
	Jordan Emaviwe 16'; Irfan Mika'il (yellow card) 89'	Report	Seia Kunori 5'; Tadanari Lee 44'; Shuto Komaki 53'; Asahi Yokokawa 70'; Keito Komatsu 76'; Kaisei Ogawa (yellow card) 10'	Stadium: Bishan Stadium; Referee: Ahmad A'qashah; Man of the Match: Seia Kunori

15 September 2023 24 (Rescheduled)	Balestier Khalsa (Singapore)	1–3	(Singapore) Tampines Rovers	Bishan
	Ryoya Tanigushi 88' (penalty missed) 29; Jordan Emaviwe (yellow card) 59'; Ignatius Ang (yellow card) 61'; Darren Teh (yellow card) 90'	Report	Glenn Kweh 71'; Kyoga Nakamura 90+1'; Shah Shahiran 90+4'; Miloš Zlatković (yellow card) 64'	Stadium: Bishan Stadium; Referee: Mohd Taqi

Pos	Team	Pld	W	D	L	GF	GA	GD	Pts	Qualification or relegation
1	Albirex Niigata (S) (Note: Three clubs – Albirex Niigata (S), DPMM FC and the FAS under-23 team Young Lions, are ineligible for any AFC competition spots.) (C)	24	20	2	2	86	20	+66	62	
2	Lion City Sailors (Q)	24	17	3	4	79	39	+40	54	Qualification for 2024-25 AFC Champions League Two Group Stage & ASEAN Club Championship
3	Tampines Rovers (Q)	24	14	6	4	47	32	+15	48	Qualification for 2024-25 AFC Champions League Two Group Stage
4	Balestier Khalsa	24	12	0	12	60	71	−11	36	
5	Geylang International	24	10	3	11	41	52	−11	33	
6	Hougang United	24	9	2	13	37	57	−20	29	
7	Brunei DPMM	24	6	5	13	39	43	−4	23	
8	Tanjong Pagar United	24	6	3	15	39	62	−23	21	
9	Young Lions	24	1	2	21	24	76	−52	5	

Source: Singapore Premier League
Rules for classification: 1) points; 2) goal difference; 3) number of goals scored; 4) number of wins
(C) Champions; (Q) Qualified for the phase indicated

=== Singapore Cup ===
Pos	Team	Pld	W	D	L	GF	GA	GD	Pts	Qualification
1	Lion City Sailors (Q)	3	2	1	0	12	2	+10	7	Semi-finals
2	Hougang United (Q)	3	1	1	1	5	5	0	4	Semi-finals
3	Balestier Khalsa	3	1	0	2	9	12	−3	3	
4	Tanjong Pagar United	3	1	0	2	5	12	−7	3	

Updated to match(es) played on 25 September 2023. Source: FAS
(Q) Qualified for the phase indicated

Win Draw Loss

==== Group ====
25 September 2023 Group Match 1	Balestier Khalsa (Singapore)	0–7	(Singapore) Lion City Sailors	Bishan
	Jordan Emaviwe (yellow card) 58'	Report	Richairo Zivkovic 3', 11', 36'; Diego Lopes 19', 25', 46'; Adam Swandi 75'	Stadium: Bishan Stadium; Referee: Ahmad A"qashah

21 October 2023 Group Match 2	Hougang United (Singapore)	3–2	(Singapore) Balestier Khalsa	Jalan Besar
	Louka Vaissierre Tan 3'; Djordje Maksimovic 13'; Amy Recha 87'; Abdil Qaiyyim Mutalib (yellow card) 38'; Hazzuwan Halim (yellow card) 90+9'	Report	Alen Kozar 41'; Shuhei Hoshino 57'	Stadium: Jalan Besar Stadium; Referee: Farhad Mohamed

26 November 2023 Group Match 3	Balestier Khalsa (Singapore)	7–2	(Singapore) Tanjong Pagar United	Bishan
	Alen Kozar 13' (pen.); Shuhei Hoshino 49', 74', 89', 90+4'; Daniel Goh 90+1'; Ryoya Tanigushi 90+7'	Report	Pedro Dias 27'; Naqiuddin Eunos 45' (yellow card) 61'; Shakir Hamzah (red card) 76'	Stadium: Bishan Stadium; Referee: Andrea Verolino
