= 2023 Lion City Sailors FC season =

Lion City Sailors
2023 season
- Owner: Sea Limited
- Chairman: Forrest Li
- Head coach: Aleksandar Ranković
- Stadium: Bishan Stadium
- Singapore Premier League: 2nd
- Top goalscorer: Maxime Lestienne (25 goals)
Home colours	Away colours

The 2023 season was Lion City Sailors' 28th consecutive season in the Singapore Premier League and the 4th season since privatising from Home United They played in the 2023–24 AFC Champions League, which marked their fourth appearance at the competition (including main play-offs), and their second ACL Group Stage appearance.

The female team played in the Women's Premier League (Singapore).

== Squad ==
=== Singapore Premier League ===
As of 1 October 2022

Squad No.	Name	Nationality	Date of birth (age)	Previous club	Contract since	Contract end
Goalkeepers
1	Izwan Mahbud ^{O30}	(Singapore)	14 July 1990 (age 36)	(Singapore) Hougang United	2022	2023
13	Adib Hakim	(Singapore)	9 March 1998 (age 28)	(Singapore) Young Lions FC	2020	2023
28	Zharfan Rohaizad	(Singapore)	21 February 1997 (age 29)	(Singapore) Tanjong Pagar United	2023	2023
Defenders
3	Bailey Wright	(Australia)	28 July 1992 (age 34)	(England) Rotherham United (E2)	2023	2025
5	Lionel Tan	(Singapore)	5 June 1997 (age 29)	(Singapore) Hougang United	2023	2023
11	Hafiz Nor ^{O30}	(Singapore)	22 August 1988 (age 38)	(Singapore) Warriors FC	2018	2023
14	Hariss Harun (C) ^{O30}	(Singapore)	9 November 1990 (age 35)	(Malaysia) Johor Darul Ta'zim (M1)	2021	2024
18	Harith Kanadi ^{U23}	(Singapore)	1 August 2000 (age 26)	(Singapore) Young Lions FC	2023	2024
19	Zulqarnaen Suzliman	(Singapore)	29 March 1998 (age 28)	(Singapore) Young Lions FC	2020	2023
22	Christopher van Huizen ^{O30}	(Singapore)	28 November 1992 (age 33)	(Singapore) Tampines Rovers	2023	2023
26	Bill Mamadou ^{U23}	(Singapore) (Mali)	8 September 2001 (age 25)	(Singapore) Young Lions FC	2021	2023
Midfielders
6	Anumanthan Kumar	(Singapore)	14 July 1994 (age 32)	(Malaysia) Kedah Darul Aman (M1)	2022	2024
8	Rusyaidi Salime	(Singapore)	25 April 1998 (age 28)	(Singapore) Tanjong Pagar United	2023	2023
10	Diego Lopes	(Brazil)	3 May 1994 (age 32)	(Portugal) Rio Ave (P1)	2021	2023
12	Anaqi Ismit ^{U23}	(Singapore)	24 August 2001 (age 25)	(Singapore) Tanjong Pagar United	2019	2023
16	Hami Syahin	(Singapore)	16 December 1998 (age 27)	(Singapore) Young Lions FC	2019	2023
27	Adam Swandi	(Singapore)	12 January 1996 (age 30)	(Japan) Albirex Niigata (S)	2019	2023
Strikers
7	Shawal Anuar ^{O30}	(Singapore)	29 April 1991 (age 35)	(Singapore) Hougang United	2023	2023
17	Maxime Lestienne	(Belgium)	17 June 1992 (age 34)	(Belgium) Standard Liege (B1)	2022	2023
21	Abdul Rasaq ^{U23}	(Singapore) (Nigeria)	16 June 2001 (age 25)	(Singapore) Young Lions FC	2023	2023
23	Haiqal Pashia	(Singapore)	29 November 1998 (age 27)	(Singapore) Young Lions FC	2021	2023
34	Richairo Zivkovic	(Netherlands) (Curaçao)	15 September 1996 (age 30)	(Netherlands) FC Emmen (N2)	2023	2024
Players on National Service
	Justin Hui	(Singapore)	17 February 1998 (age 28)	(Singapore) Hougang United	2021	2021
	Aniq Raushan ^{U21}	(Singapore)	5 October 2003 (age 22)	Singapore Sport School	2021	2022
	Glenn Ong Jing Jie ^{U21}	(Singapore)	16 July 2003 (age 23)	Singapore Sport School	2021	2022
	Khairin Nadim ^{U21}	(Singapore)	8 May 2004 (age 22)	(Singapore) Young Lions FC	2023	2025
15	Danish Qayyum ^{U23}	(Singapore)	2 February 2002 (age 24)	(Singapore) Young Lions FC	2023	2023
30	Nur Adam Abdullah ^{U23}	(Singapore)	13 April 2001 (age 25)	(Singapore) Young Lions FC	2021	2023
Players not registered / de-registered for SPL
2	Pedro Henrique	(Brazil)	18 December 1992 (age 33)	(Brazil) Atlético Goianiense	2022	2024
4	Manuel Herrera López	(Spain)	21 November 1991 (age 34)	(Cambodia) Nagaworld FC	2023	2023
9	Kodai Tanaka	(Japan)	23 December 1999 (age 26)	(Japan) Albirex Niigata (S)	2023	2023
46	Rui Pires	(Portugal)	22 March 1998 (age 28)	(Portugal) Paços de Ferreira (P1)	2023	2025
Players loaned out during mid-season
24	Rudy Khairullah	(Singapore)	19 July 1994 (age 32)	(Singapore) Balestier Khalsa	2017	2023
20	Arshad Shamim	(Singapore)	9 December 1999 (age 26)	(Singapore) Young Lions FC	2018	2023
Players left during mid-season
29	Bernie Ibini-Isei	(Australia) (Nigeria)	12 September 1992 (age 34)	(Australia) Western Sydney Wanderers	2023	2023
	Amiruldin Asraf	(Singapore)	8 January 1997 (age 29)	(Singapore) LCS Academy	2017	2023

Note 1: Pedro Henrique remained with the team but not registered for the SPL.

Note 2: Kodai Tanaka remained with the team but was de-registered for the SPL after sustaining a season ending injury.

=== Women squad (LCS) ===
Squad No.	Name	Nationality	Date of birth (age)	Previous club	Contract since	Contract end
Goalkeeper
1	Noor Kusumawati	(Singapore)	29 September 1990 (age 35)	(Singapore) Warriors FC	2022	2023
22	Beatrice Tan Li Bin	(Singapore)	29 June 1992 (age 34)	(Singapore) Tanjong Pagar United	2022	2023
Defender
3	Fatin Aqillah	(Singapore)	11 June 1994 (age 32)	(Singapore) Tanjong Pagar United	2022	2023
4	Umairah Hamdan	(Singapore)	11 March 2002 (age 24)	(Singapore) South Avenue CSC	2022	2023
8	Syazwani Ruzi	(Singapore)	6 March 2001 (age 25)	(Singapore) Still Aerion	2022	2023
13	Ernie Sulastri	(Singapore)	24 November 1988 (age 37)	(Singapore) Home United	2022	2023
17	Khairunnisa Anwar	(Singapore)	21 February 2003 (age 23)	(Singapore) South Avenue CSC	2022	2023
18	Munirah Mohamad	(Singapore)	13 February 1997 (age 29)	(Singapore) Police SA	2022	2023
25	Sara Hayduchok	(Philippines) (United States)		(Singapore) JSSL Tampines	2023	2023
27	Tia Foong Po Shiun	(Singapore)	31 July 2007 (age 19)	(Singapore) Mattar Sailors (W)	2022	2023
	Seri Nurinsyirah	(Singapore)	27 January 2007 (age 19)	(Singapore) Mattar Sailors (W)	2023	2023
Midfielder
14	Madelin Sophie Lock	(Singapore)	24 May 2007 (age 19)	(Singapore) Mattar Sailors (W)	2022	2023
16	Ho Huixin	(Singapore)	23 April 1992 (age 34)	(Singapore) Home United	2022	2023
19	Julia-Vanessa Farr	(Germany)	12 August 1991 (age 35)	(Singapore) Warriors FC	2022	2023
20	Cara Ming-Yan Chang	(Singapore)	28 November 2008 (age 17)	(Singapore) Mattar Sailors (W)	2022	2023
21	Venetia Lim Ying Xuan	(Singapore)	14 October 2003 (age 22)	(Singapore) Still Aerion	2022	2023
Forwards
5	Miray Hokotate Altun	(Japan)	6 April 2005 (age 21)	ANZA Singapore	2022	2023
9	Lila Tan Hui Ying	(Singapore) (France)	4 June 2003 (age 23)	(China) Aksil Shanghai	2022	2023
10	Izzati Rosni	(Singapore)	24 May 1999 (age 27)	(Malaysia) SWAT FC	2022	2023
12	Josephine Ang Kaile	(Singapore)	26 September 2006 (age 20)	(Singapore) Mattar Sailors (W)	2022	2023
23	Nica Siy	(Philippines)		(Philippines) Kaya F.C.–Iloilo (W)	2023	2023
Mid-season transferred players
2	Madison Josephine Telmer	(Canada)	29 October 2004 (age 21)	ANZA Singapore	2022	2023
6	Seri Ayu Natasha Naszri	(Singapore)	19 December 2007 (age 18)	(Singapore) Mattar Sailors (W)	2022	2023
7	Paula Druschke	(Germany)			2022	2023
11	Ardhra Arul Ganeswaran	(Singapore)	25 July 2007 (age 19)	(Singapore) Mattar Sailors (W)	2022	2023
99	Chloe Koh Ke Ying	(Singapore)	18 February 2007 (age 19)	(Singapore) Mattar Sailors (W)	2022	2023

=== Women squad (Mattar Sailors) ===
Squad No.	Name	Nationality	Date of birth (age)	Previous club	Contract since	Contract end
Goalkeeper
1	Izairida Shakira	(Singapore)	2 June 2007 (age 19)		2022	2023
18	Chantale Lamasan Rosa	(Singapore)		Singapore Sports School	2023	2023
	Nurul Illyanis	(Singapore)	27 January 2007 (age 19)	(Singapore)	2023	2023
Defender
3	Tasha Foong Po Yui	(Singapore)	27 May 2005 (age 21)	(Singapore) ITE College East	2022	2023
4	Tyan Foong	(Singapore)		(Singapore)	2023	2023
5	Rebecca Harding	(Malaysia)		(Singapore)	2023	2023
12	Siti Nur Hidayah	(Singapore)		(Singapore) Balestier Khalsa	2023	2023
14	Isis Ang	(Singapore)	10 January 2003 (age 23)	(Singapore)	2022	2022
16	Syaizta Ohorella	(Singapore)		(Singapore)	2023	2023
Midfielder
6	Nadia Nuraffendi	(Singapore)	14 April 2006 (age 20)	(Singapore) Tampines-Meridian JC	2023	2023
8	Jaen Lee	(Singapore)		(Singapore)	2023	2023
10	Liyana Indah Rickit	(Singapore)	14 October 2009 (age 16)	(Singapore) ActiveSG	2022	2023
15	Yuvika Suresh	(Singapore)	1 March 2009 (age 17)	(Singapore)	2022	2023
17	Natasha Kaur	(Singapore)		(Singapore)	2023	2023
19	Anusha Saluja	(Singapore)		(Singapore)	2023	2023
20	Dorcas Chu	(Singapore)	29 July 2002 (age 24)	(Singapore) Lion City Sailors Women	2022	2023
21	Ruby Tjipto	(Singapore)		Youth Academy	2023	2023
22	Sara Merican	(Singapore)	19 April 1996 (age 30)	(Singapore) Lion City Sailors Women	2022	2023
	Aaniya Ahuja	(Singapore)	30 December 2005 (age 20)	Singapore American School	2022	2022
Forward
7	Nor Adriana Lim	(Singapore)		(Singapore)	2023	2023
9	Raeka Ee Pei Ying	(Singapore)		Singapore Sports School	2023	2023
11	Elena Khoo	(Singapore)		(Singapore) Brazilian Football Academy	2023	2023
13	Katelyn Yeoh	(Singapore)		(Singapore)	2023	2023
23	Nur Ain Salleh	(Singapore)		Youth Academy	2023	2023
24	Maxine Maribbay	(Singapore)	21 April 2005 (age 21)		2023	2023
25	Syafina Putri Rashid	(Singapore)	9 August 2004 (age 22)	(Singapore) Lion City Sailors Women	2022	2023
	Zalikha Haidah Abdul Rahman	(Singapore)	15 September 2004 (age 22)	(Singapore) ITE College Central	2022	2022
	Naureen Qadriyah	(Singapore)		(Singapore) Fuhua Secondary School	2023	2023
	Celine Koh	(Singapore)		Youth Team	2022	2023

== Coaching staff ==
The following list displays the coaching staff of all the Lion City Sailors current football sections:

First Team

Position	Name
Chairman	(Singapore) (China) Forrest Li
CEO	(Singapore)
General Manager	(Singapore) Badri Ghent
Team Manager (SPL)	(Vietnam) Hương Trần
Team Manager (WPL)	(Singapore) Jenny Tan
Technical Director	(Serbia) Luka Lalić
Head Coach	(Serbia) Aleksandar Ranković
Head Coach (Women)	(Singapore) Yeong Sheau Shyan
Assistant Coach	(Serbia) Marko Perović
Goalkeeping Coach	(Slovenia) Kris Stergulc
Goalkeeping Coach (Assistant)	(Singapore) Chua Lye Heng
Goalkeeping Coach (Women)	(Singapore) Daniel Ong
Conditioning Coach	(Bosnia and Herzegovina) Dzevad Saric
Head of Performance	(Netherlands) Mark Onderwater
Head of Rehabilitation	(Netherlands) Mike Kerklaan
Head of Technical Training	(Portugal) Rodrigo Costa
Head of Video Analyst	(Spain) Pablo Muñiz
Video Analyst	(Singapore) Nigel Goh
Physiologist	(Netherlands) Niels Van Sundert (Spain) David Conde
Head of Logistics	(Singapore) Zahir Taufeek

Academy

Position	Name
Technical Director	(Serbia) Luka Lalić
General Manager	(Singapore) Tan Li Yu
Team Manager (WPL)	(Singapore) Jenny Tan
Head Coach (SFL)	(Singapore)
Goalkeeper Coach (Under-21)	(Singapore)
Goalkeeping Coach (Development)	(Slovenia) Matija Radikon
Goalkeeping Coach (Foundation)	(Singapore) Shahril Jantan
Strength & Conditioning Coach (Academy)	(Singapore) Chloe Alphonso (Singapore) Derrick Ang
Performance Coordinator (Academy)	(Germany) Lewin Kösterke
Medical Coordinator (Academy)	(Netherlands) Wouter de Vroome
Physiologist (Academy)	(Spain) Santiago Izquierdo Monllor
Head of Youth Team (Development) & Under-21 Coach	(Netherlands) Daan van Oudheusden
Head of Youth Team (Foundation)	(Singapore) Tengku Mushadad
Under-17 Head Coach	(Spain) José Mataix
Under-15 Head Coach	(Serbia) Danilo Tesic
Under-13 Head Coach	(Singapore) Ashraf Ariffin
Under-12 Head Coach	(Singapore) Kevin Tan
Under-11 Head Coach	(Netherlands) Lucas Ekers
Under-10 Head Coach	(Portugal) Francisco Couto
Technical Coach (Development)	(Portugal) Nuno Pereira
Technical Coach (Foundation)	(Portugal) Diogo Costa
Video Analyst (Academy)	(Spain) Pol Corpas Cuatrecasas (Singapore) Poh Kai Ern (Singapore) Shaun Tan
Data Analyst (Academy)	(Singapore) Gautam Selvamany
Medical Logistics	(Singapore) Masrezal Bin Mashuri
Nutritionist	(Netherlands) Denise Van Ewijk

== Transfers ==
=== In ===
Pre-season

Position	Player	Transferred from	Team	Ref
GK	(Singapore) Zharfan Rohaizad	(Singapore) Tanjong Pagar United	First team	Free
DF	(Singapore) Rusyaidi Salime	(Singapore) Tanjong Pagar United	First team	Free
DF	(Singapore) Christopher van Huizen	(Singapore) Tampines Rovers	First team	Free
DF	(Singapore) Lionel Tan	(Singapore) Hougang United	First team	Undisclosed
DF	(Spain) Manuel Herrera López	(Cambodia) Nagaworld FC	First team	Free
MF	(Singapore) Danish Qayyum	(Singapore) Young Lions FC	First team	Free
MF	(Singapore) Syed Adel Alsree	(Singapore) Young Lions FC	U21	Free
MF	(Singapore) Amir Mirza	(Singapore) Tampines Rovers U21	U21	Free
FW	(Japan) Kodai Tanaka	(Japan) Albirex Niigata (S)	First team	Free
FW	(Australia) (Nigeria) Bernie Ibini-Isei	(Australia) Western Sydney Wanderers	First team	Free
FW	(Singapore) Shawal Anuar	(Singapore) Hougang United	First team	Free
FW	(Singapore) Abdul Rasaq	(Singapore) Young Lions FC	First team	Free
FW	(Singapore) Khairin Nadim	(Singapore) Young Lions FC	U21	Free (Note: Khairin Nadim signed and loaned to Young lions while serving NS)
FW	(Bosnia and Herzegovina) (Australia) Obren Kljajic	(Serbia) FK Voždovac U19	U21	Free

Mid-season

Position	Player	Transferred from	Team	Ref
DF	(Australia) Bailey Wright	(England) Sunderland AFC (E2)	First team	2 years contract from June 2023 till June 2025; Include 1 year option
MF	(Portugal) Rui Pires	(Portugal) Paços de Ferreira (P1)	First team	2 years contract from June 2023 till June 2025
FW	(Netherlands) (Curaçao) Richairo Zivkovic	(Netherlands) FC Emmen (N2)	First team	1-year contract from June 2023 till June 2024
DF	(Singapore) Harith Kanadi	(Singapore) Geylang International	First team	2 years contract from August 2023 till June 2025

=== Out ===
Preseason

Position	Player	Transferred To	Team	Ref
GK	(Singapore) Hassan Sunny	(Japan) Albirex Niigata (S)	First Team	Free
GK	(Singapore) Prathip Ekamparam	(Singapore) Young Lions FC	U21	Free
GK	(Singapore) Putra Anugerah	(Singapore)	U21	Free
GK	(Singapore) Dylan Christopher Goh	(Singapore) Geylang International U21	U21	Free
GK	(Singapore) Travis Ang	(Singapore) Tanjong Pagar United U21	Mattar Sailors	Free
GK	(Singapore) Firman Nabil	(Japan) Albirex Niigata U19	Mattar Sailors	Free
GK	(Singapore) Nicolas Geeraerts	(Singapore) German-Swiss All Stars	Mattar Sailors	Free
GK	(Singapore) Efan Qiszman	(Singapore) Balestier Khalsa U21	AFA DC	Free
DF	(Singapore) Tajeli Salamat	(Singapore) Tanjong Pagar United	First Team	Free
DF	(Singapore) Naqiuddin Eunos	(Singapore) Tanjong Pagar United	First Team	Free
DF	(Singapore) Iqram Rifqi	(Singapore) Balestier Khalsa	First Team	Free
DF	(Singapore) Amirul Adli	(Singapore) Geylang International	First Team	Free
DF	(Singapore) Ian Faris Shahrin	(Singapore) Geylang International U21	U21	Free
DF	(Singapore) Syafi Hilman	(Singapore) Young Lions FC	U21	Free
DF	(Singapore) Fudhil I'yadh	(Singapore) Balestier Khalsa	U21	Free
DF	(Singapore) Aqil Dany Jahsh Ruzzman	(Singapore) Balestier Khalsa U21	U21	Free
DF	(Singapore) Brant Tan Jun Rong	(Singapore) Hougang United U21	U21	Free
DF	(Singapore) Ifat Sha'aban	(Singapore) Police SA	U21	Free
DF	(Singapore) Danish Iftiqar	(Singapore)	U21	Free
DF	(Singapore) Nifail Noorhaizam	(Singapore) Tanjong Pagar United U21	U17	Free
DF	(Singapore) Farid Jafri	(Singapore) Tanjong Pagar United U21	Mattar Sailors	Free
DF	(Singapore) Daniel Elfian	(Singapore) Tanjong Pagar United U21	Mattar Sailors	Free
DF	(Singapore) Danial Azman	(Singapore)	Mattar Sailors	Free
DF	(Singapore) Merrick Tan Yi Ern	(Singapore) Balestier Khalsa U21	AFA DC	Free.
DF	(Singapore) Bradly Yap Zhi Hao	(Singapore) Balestier Khalsa U21	AFA DC	Free.
MF	(Singapore) Song Ui-young	(Thailand) Nongbua Pitchaya	First Team	Undisclosed
MF	(Singapore) Faris Ramli	(Singapore) Tampines Rovers	First Team	Free
MF	(Singapore) Saifullah Akbar	(Singapore) Tampines Rovers	First Team	Free
MF	(Singapore) Shahdan Sulaiman	(Singapore) Hougang United	First Team	Free
MF	(Singapore) Gabriel Quak Jun Yi	(Singapore) Hougang United	First Team	Free
MF	(Singapore) Aizal Murhamdani	(Singapore)	U21	Free
MF	(Singapore) Syahmi Indallah	(Singapore) Tanjong Pagar United U21	U17	Free
MF	(Singapore) (Indonesia) Febryan Pradana	(Singapore) Tanjong Pagar United U21	Mattar Sailors	Free.
MF	(Singapore) Rian Haziq Rosley	(Singapore) Tanjong Pagar United U21	Mattar Sailors	Free.
MF	(England) (Singapore) George Thomas	(Singapore) Tanjong Pagar United U21	AFA DC	Free.
MF	(Singapore) Sahoo Garv	(Singapore) Balestier Khalsa U21	AFA DC	Free.
MF	(Singapore) Sara Merican	(Singapore)	Women	Free.
MF	(Germany) Giselle Blumke	(Singapore) JSSL Tampines	Mattar Sailors (W)	Free.
FW	(South Korea) Kim Shin-wook	(Hong Kong) Kitchee SC	First Team	Free
FW	(Singapore) Nashrul Iman	(Singapore)	U21	Free
FW	(Singapore) Sham Mohamed	(Singapore) Geylang International U21	U21	Free
FW	(Singapore) Nicole Lim Yan Xiu	(Singapore) Hougang United	Women	Free.
FW	(Singapore) Nur Syafina Putri Rashid	(Singapore) Mattar Sailors (W)	Women	Free.
FW	(Singapore) Nurul Ariqah	(Singapore) Balestier Khalsa (W)	Mattar Sailors (W)	Free

Mid-season

Position	Player	Transferred To	Team	Ref
MF	(Singapore) Syed Adel Alsree	(Singapore) Hougang United U21	U21	Free
MF	(India) (Singapore) Nigel Kunnan	(India) FC Madras U17	U17	Free
MF	(Canada) Madison Telmer	(Canada) UFV Cascades	Women	Free
MF	(Singapore) Seri Ayu Natasha Naszri	(Spain) ESC La Liga Academy	Women	Scholarship till 2025
MF	(Singapore) Ardhra Arul Ganeswaran	(United States) IMG Academy	Women	Scholarship till 2026
MF	(Singapore) Dorcas Chu	(Singapore) Mattar Sailors (W)	Women	Free.
FW	(Australia) (Nigeria) Bernie Ibini-Isei		First team	Free
FW	(Singapore) Amiruldin Asraf	(Singapore) Young Lions FC	First team	Free
FW	(Bosnia and Herzegovina) (Australia) Obren Kljajic	(Australia) Peninsula Power (A2)	U21	Free
FW	(Germany) Paula Druschke	NA	Women	Free
FW	(Singapore) Chloe Koh Ke Ying	(United States) IMG Academy	Women	Scholarship till 2026

=== Loan Returns ===
Preseason

Position	Player	Transferred from	Team	Ref
GK	(Singapore) Rudy Khairullah	(Singapore) Balestier Khalsa	First Team	Loan Return
GK	(Singapore) Putra Anugerah	(Singapore) Young Lions FC (Note: To be released after his contract end at end of season)	U21	Loan Return
DF	(Singapore) Tajeli Salamat	(Singapore) Geylang International (Note: To be released after his contract end at end of season)	First Team	Loan Return

Mid-season

Position	Player	Transferred from	Ref

=== Loans Out ===
Preseason

Position	Player	Transferred To	Team	Ref
MF	(Singapore) Nur Izzati Rosni	(Malaysia) FC SWAT	Women	On loan till March 2023
MF	(Singapore) Ernie Sulastri	(Malaysia) FC SWAT	Women	On loan till March 2023
MF	(Singapore) Justin Hui	(Singapore) Police SA	First Team	On National Service until October 2023
DF	(Singapore) Rayyan Ramzdan	(Singapore) SAFSA	U21	On National Service until January 2024
MF	(Singapore) Arsyad Basiron	(Singapore) SAFSA	U21	On National Service until January 2024
MF	(Singapore) Asis Ijilral	(Singapore) SAFSA	U21	On National Service until January 2024
MF	(Singapore) Danie Hafiy	(Singapore) SAFSA	U21	On National Service until January 2024
MF	(Singapore) Yasir Nizamudin	(Singapore) SAFSA	U21	On National Service until March 2024
DF	(Singapore) Marcus Mosses	(Singapore) SAFSA	U21	On National Service until March 2024
MF	(Singapore) Uvayn Kumar	(Singapore) SAFSA	U21	On National Service until March 2024
GK	(Singapore) Veer Karan Sobti	(Singapore)	U21	On National Service until October 2024
DF	(Singapore) Aniq Raushan	(Singapore)	U21	On National Service until January 2025
FW	(Singapore) Khairin Nadim	(Singapore) Young Lions FC	U21	On National Service until January 2025 (Note: Khairin Nadim signed and loaned to Young lions while serving NS)
MF	(Singapore) Glenn Ong Jing Jie	(Singapore)	U21	On National Service until January 2025
DF	(Singapore) Nur Adam Abdullah	(Singapore)	First Team	On National Service until September 2025
MF	(Singapore) Danish Qayyum	(Singapore)	First Team	On National Service until September 2025

Mid-Season

Position	Player	Transferred To	Team	Ref
GK	(Singapore) Rudy Khairullah	(Singapore) Geylang International	First Team	Season loan
DF	(Singapore) Arshad Shamim	(Singapore) Geylang International	First Team	Season loan
FW	(Singapore) (Nigeria) Uchenna Eziakor	(Spain) ESC La Liga Academy	U15	Free

=== Contract extensions ===
Position	Player	Ref
GK	(Singapore) Rudy Khairullah	1-year extension till 2023
GK	(Singapore) Adib Hakim	1-year extension till 2023
GK	(Singapore) Izwan Mahbud	2 years contract from 2022 till 2023
GK	(Singapore) Veer Karan Sobti	4 years extension from 2022 till 2025
DF	(Brazil) Pedro Henrique	3 years contract from 2022 till 2024
DF	(Singapore) Nur Adam Abdullah	1-year extension till 2023
DF	(Singapore) Zulqarnaen Suzliman	1-year extension till 2023
DF	(Singapore) (Mali) Bill Mamadou	1-year extension till 2023 (Promoted)
MF	(Singapore) Anaqi Ismit	1-year extension till 2023 (Promoted)
MF	(Singapore) Anumanthan Kumar	3 years contract from 2022 till 2024
MF	(Singapore) Hariss Harun	3.5 years contract from 2021 till 2024
MF	(Singapore) Adam Swandi	1-year extension till 2023
MF	(Singapore) Hami Syahin	1-year extension till 2023
MF	(Singapore) Arshad Shamim	1-year extension till 2023
MF	(Singapore) Hafiz Nor	1-year extension till 2023
MF	(Brazil) Diego Lopes	3 years contract from 2021 till 2023
FW	(Singapore) Haiqal Pashia	1-year extension till 2023
FW	(Belgium) Maxime Lestienne	2 years contract from 2022 till 2023

== Friendlies ==
First Team

28 January 2023 1	Albirex Niigata (S) (Japan)	v	(Singapore) Lion City Sailors	Jalan Besar
	Hilman Norhisam			Stadium: Jalan Besar Stadium

4 February 2023 2	Lion City Sailors (Singapore)	v	(Singapore) Tanjong Pagar United	Bishan
				Stadium: Bishan Stadium

February 2023 3	Lion City Sailors (Singapore)	2–1	(Singapore) Hougang United	Bishan
	Obren Kljajic			Stadium: Bishan Stadium

10 February 2023 4	Lion City Sailors (Singapore)	2–2	(Singapore) Tampines Rovers	Bishan
	Abdul Rasaq; Kodai Tanaka		Boris Kopitović; Faris Ramli	Stadium: Bishan Stadium

17 February 2023 5	Johor Darul Ta'zim (Malaysia)	4–0	(Singapore) Lion City Sailors	Malaysia
		Report		Stadium: Sultan Ibrahim Stadium, Johor

26 July 2023 6	Lion City Sailors (Singapore)	1–5	(England) Tottenham Hotspur	Kallang, Singapore
	Shawal Anuar 14'	Report	Harry Kane 45+2' (pen.); Richarlison 48', 52', 90+4'; Giovani Lo Celso 73'	Stadium: National Stadium; Attendance: 25,095; Referee: Andrea Verolino

== Team statistics ==
=== Appearances and goals (LCS) ===
As of 13 Dec 2023

No.	Pos.	Player	SPL		Singapore Cup		AFC Champions League		Total	
No.	Pos.	Player	Apps.	Goals	Apps.	Goals	Apps.	Goals	Apps.	Goals
1	GK	(Singapore) Izwan Mahbud	0	0	6	0	0	0	6	0
2	DF	(Brazil) Pedro Henrique	0	0	0	0	2	0	2	0
3	DF	(Australia) Bailey Wright	4	2	3+1	1	1+1	0	10	3
4	DF	(Spain) Manuel Herrera López	8+1	1	0	0	5	0	14	1
5	DF	(Singapore) Lionel Tan	19+5	2	6	0	4+1	0	35	2
6	MF	(Singapore) Anumanthan Kumar	18+3	0	6	1	5	0	32	1
7	FW	(Singapore) Shawal Anuar	10+11	10	1+5	6	3+3	0	33	16
8	DF	(Singapore) Rusyaidi Salime	0+8	0	1+2	0	0+2	0	13	0
9	FW	(Japan) Kodai Tanaka	3	3	0	0	1+2	0	5	3
10	MF	(Brazil) Diego Lopes	22+1	8	6	5	3	1	32	14
11	FW	(Singapore) Hafiz Nor	18+4	2	2+4	0	0+5	0	33	2
12	MF	(Singapore) Anaqi Ismit	0	0	0	0	0	0	0	0
14	DF	(Singapore) Hariss Harun	20+2	0	5+1	0	6	0	34	0
16	MF	(Singapore) Hami Syahin	19+4	2	3+2	0	0+4	0	32	2
17	FW	(Belgium) Maxime Lestienne	24	25	5	1	6	1	35	27
18	DF	(Singapore) Harith Kanadi	0	0	1+1	0	0	0	2	0
19	DF	(Singapore) Zulqarnaen Suzliman	6+12	0	4+2	0	6	0	30	0
21	FW	(Singapore) (Nigeria) Abdul Rasaq	12+6	10	0	0	0	0	18	10
22	DF	(Singapore) Christopher van Huizen	14+3	1	4+2	0	6	0	29	1
23	FW	(Singapore) Haiqal Pashia	0+10	2	1+4	0	0+4	0	17	2
26	DF	(Singapore) (Mali) Bill Mamadou	5+2	0	2	0	0	0	9	0
27	MF	(Singapore) Adam Swandi	14+8	3	1+5	1	0+6	0	34	4
28	GK	(Singapore) Zharfan Rohaizad	24	0	0	0	6	0	30	0
34	FW	(Netherlands) (Curaçao) Richairo Zivkovic	6+1	6	6	6	6	3	19	15
46	MF	(Portugal) Rui Pires	0	0	0	0	6	0	6	0
61	MF	(Singapore) Nathan Mao Zhi Xuan	1+2	0	3+1	0	0	0	7	0
64	DF	(Singapore) Idzham Eszuan	0+1	0	0	0	0	0	1	0
77	MF	(Singapore) Asis Ijilral	0+3	0	0	0	0	0	3	0
Players featured on a match for LCS, but left the club mid-season, either permanently or on loan transfer
15	MF	(Singapore) Danish Qayyum	0+1	0	0	0	0	0	1	0
20	MF	(Singapore) Arshad Shamim	0+4	0	0	0	0	0	4	0
29	FW	(Australia) (Nigeria) Bernie Ibini-Isei	3+5	0	0	0	0	0	8	0
30	DF	(Singapore) Nur Adam Abdullah	15+2	0	0	0	0	0	17	0
55	MF	(Singapore) Jonan Tan En Yuan	0+2	0	0	0	0	0	2	0

== Competitions (LCS) ==
=== Overview ===
As of 5 Oct 2023

Competition	Record							
Competition	P	W	D	L	GF	GA	GD	Win %
Singapore Premier League	24	17	3	4	79	39	+40	70.83
Singapore Cup	6	4	2	0	21	6	+15	66.67
AFC Champions League	6	2	0	4	5	9	−4	33.33
Total	36	23	5	8	105	54	+51	63.89

Results summary (SPL)

Overall								Home						Away					
Pld	W	D	L	GF	GA	GD	Pts	W	D	L	GF	GA	GD	W	D	L	GF	GA	GD
24	17	3	4	79	39	+40	54	10	1	1	35	14	+21	7	2	3	44	25	+19

=== Singapore Premier League ===
Win Draw Loss

25 February 2023 1	Lion City Sailors (Singapore)	3–1	(Singapore) Tanjong Pagar United	Bishan
	Hafiz Nor 11'; Kodai Tanaka 89', 90+3'	Report	Shahrin Saberin 90+2'; Mirko Šugić (penalty missed) 68	Stadium: Bishan Stadium; Attendance: 1,300; Referee: Ahmad A'qashah

3 March 2023 2	Lion City Sailors (Singapore)	3–1	(Brunei) DPMM FC	Bishan
	Maxime Lestienne 45+2'; Kodai Tanaka 75'; Abdul Rasaq 90+5'; Bill Mamadou (yellow card) 42'; Hafiz Nor (yellow card) 70'; Christopher van Huizen (yellow card) 80'	Report	Hakeme Yazid Said 62'; Hanif Hamir (yellow card) 43'	Stadium: Bishan Stadium; Referee: Mohd Taqi

9 March 2023 3	Albirex Niigata (S) (Japan)	4–0	(Singapore) Lion City Sailors	Jurong East
	Lionel Tan 30' (o.g.); Ryo Takahashi 37'; Kaisei Ogawa 87'; Seia Kunori 89'; Nicky Melvin Singh (yellow card) 45'	Report	Anumanthan Kumar (red card) 15'; Arshad Shamim (yellow card) 85'	Stadium: Jurong East Stadium; Attendance: 1,695; Referee: Syarqawi Buhari

15 March 2023 4	Lion City Sailors (Singapore)	3–0	(Singapore) Geylang International	Bishan
	Hafiz Nor 22'; Diego Lopes 45+1' (penalty missed) 19; Abdul Rasaq 71'	Report	Huzaifah Aziz (yellow card) 39'; Joshua Pereira (yellow card) 82'	Stadium: Bishan Stadium; Referee: Andrea Verolino

18 March 2023 5	Lion City Sailors (Singapore)	3–0	(Singapore) Balestier Khalsa	Bishan
	Maxime Lestienne 19', 90+2' (pen.); Abdul Rasaq 48'; Christopher van Huizen (yellow card) 5'	Report	Madhu Mohana (yellow card) 30'	Stadium: Bishan Stadium; Referee: Hilmi Faud

31 March 2023 6	Tampines Rovers (Singapore)	4–3	(Singapore) Lion City Sailors	Tampines
	Yasir Hanapi 20'; Kyoga Nakamura 30'; Faris Ramli 50'; Taufik Suparno 72' (yellow card) 90+6'; Glenn Kweh (yellow card) 78'; Miloš Zlatković (yellow card) 90+5'	Report	Shawal Anuar 8'; Glenn Kweh 56' (o.g.); Manuel Herrera López 90+4' (yellow card) 79'; Maxime Lestienne (yellow card) 90+5'	Stadium: Our Tampines Hub; Referee: Mohd Taqi; Man of the Match: Kyoga Nakamura

10 April 2023 7	Hougang United (Singapore)	0–5	(Singapore) Lion City Sailors	Jalan Besar
	Kristijan Krajcek (yellow card) 5'; Sahil Suhaimi (yellow card) 41'; Brian Ferreira (yellow card) 76'	Report	Maxime Lestienne 6', 90+1'; Abdul Rasaq 44' 72'; Diego Lopes 88' (yellow card) 58'; Zharfan Rohaizad (yellow card) 63'	Stadium: Jalan Besar Stadium; Referee: Ahmad A'qashah

15 April 2023 8	Young Lions FC (Singapore)	1–1	(Singapore) Lion City Sailors	Jalan Besar
	Jordan Emaviwe 90+8' (pen.)	Report	Maxime Lestienne 6'; Hami Syahin (yellow card) 32'; Lionel Tan (yellow card) 90+5'	Stadium: Jalan Besar Stadium; Referee: Andrea Verolino

7 May 2023 9	Geylang International (Singapore)	1–2	(Singapore) Lion City Sailors	Tampines
	Iqbal Hussain 10'; Huzaifah Aziz (yellow card) 45+2'; Ahmad Syahir (yellow card) 68'; Naufal Azman (yellow card) 70'; Vincent Bezecourt (yellow card) 85'	Report	Maxime Lestienne 69', 89'; Hami Syahin (yellow card) 19'; Zulqarnaen Suzliman (yellow card) 79'; Rusyaidi Salime (red card) 90+4' (yellow card) 86'	Stadium: Our Tampines Hub; Referee: Jansen Foo

13 May 2023 10	DPMM FC (Brunei)	3–3	(Singapore) Lion City Sailors	Jalan Besar
	Andrey Voronkov 4' 30', 89'; Yura Indera Putera Yunos (yellow card) 38'; Hakeme Yazid Said (yellow card) 70'; Abdul Mu'iz Sisa (yellow card) 72'; Azwan Ali Rahman (yellow card) 76'; Hanif Hamir (yellow card) 81'	Report	Diego Lopes 15'; Maxime Lestienne 19', 45'; Nur Adam Abdullah (yellow card) 41'; Hami Syahin (yellow card) 90+3'	Stadium: Jalan Besar Stadium (Note: Hassanal Bolkiah National Stadium unavailable due to ongoing renovations.); Referee: Ahmad A'qashah

21 May 2023 11	Lion City Sailors (Singapore)	3–2	(Japan) Albirex Niigata (S)	Bishan
	Diego Lopes 49'; Shawal Anuar 53'; Abdul Rasaq 75'; Adam Swandi (yellow card) 62'; Hafiz Nor (yellow card) 90+2'	Report	Nur Adam Abdullah 13' (o.g.); Tadanari Lee 25'; Asahi Yokokawa (yellow card) 15'; Sho Fuwa (yellow card) 17'	Stadium: Bishan Stadium; Referee: Farhan Mohamed

1 June 2023 12	Balestier Khalsa (Singapore)	4–5	(Singapore) Lion City Sailors	Bishan
	Fabian Kwok 21'; Ryoya Tanigushi 66', 86' (pen.); Shuhei Hoshino 82'; Alen Kozar (yellow card) 63'; Daniel Goh (yellow card) 87'	Report	Shawal Anuar 19', 55'; Maxime Lestienne 38', 76'; Diego Lopes 40' (yellow card) 44'; Nur Adam Abdullah (yellow card) 2'; Adam Swandi (yellow card) 10'; Hami Syahin (yellow card) 87'; Bernie Ibini-Isei (yellow card) 90+8'	Stadium: Bishan Stadium; Referee: Ahmad A'qashah

7 June 2023 13	Lion City Sailors (Singapore)	1–1	(Singapore) Tampines Rovers	Bishan
	Maxime Lestienne 84' (pen.); Hariss Harun (yellow card) 62'	Report	Faris Ramli 58'; Yasir Hanapi (yellow card) 26' (yellow-red card) 62'; Miloš Zlatković (yellow card) 83'	Stadium: Bishan Stadium; Referee: Mohd Taqi

10 June 2023 14	Lion City Sailors (Singapore)	4–1	(Singapore) Young Lions FC	Bishan
	Kan Kobayashi 18' (o.g.); Shawal Anuar 32'; Abdul Rasaq 40'; Maxime Lestienne 53'; Anumanthan Kumar (yellow card) 45+2'; Hami Syahin (yellow card) 48'; Nur Adam Abdullah (yellow card) 61'	Report	Jun Kobayashi 87'; Aqil Yazid (yellow card) 90+2'	Stadium: Bishan Stadium; Referee: Andrea Verolino

25 June 2023 15	Lion City Sailors (Singapore)	3–0	(Singapore) Hougang United	Bishan
	Abdul Rasaq 45+3'; Adam Swandi 48', 75'	Report		Stadium: Bishan Stadium; Referee: Farhad Mohamed

1 July 2023 16	Tanjong Pagar United (Singapore)	1–7	(Singapore) Lion City Sailors	Jurong East
	Faizal Roslan 30'; Khairul Hairie (yellow card) 31'; Shahrin Saberin (yellow card) 72'; Tajeli Salamat (yellow card) 90+4'	Report	Maxime Lestienne 10'; Abdul Rasaq 27'; Lionel Tan 63'; Diego Lopes 73' (pen.), 88'; Hami Syahin 78'; Shawal Anuar 90+10'; Zulqarnaen Suzliman (yellow card) 90+2'	Stadium: Jurong East Stadium; Referee: Clarence Leow Hong Wei

7 July 2023 17	Young Lions FC (Singapore)	0–4	(Singapore) Lion City Sailors	Jalan Besar
	Syahadat Masnawi (yellow card) 61'; Aqil Yazid (yellow card) 63'; Jun Kobayashi (yellow card) 88'	Report	Maxime Lestienne 60', 68', 88'; Shawal Anuar 86'; Hafiz Nor (yellow card) 75'; Rusyaidi Salime (yellow card) 90+1'	Stadium: Jalan Besar Stadium; Referee: Farhad Mohamed

11 July 2023 18	Lion City Sailors (Singapore)	1–3	(Brunei) DPMM FC	Bishan
	Adam Swandi 52'; Maxime Lestienne (penalty missed) 45+8; Bailey Wright (red card) 32'	Report	Azwan Ali Rahman 9'; Hakeme Yazid Said 34'; Ángel Martínez 64'; Farshad Noor (yellow card) 45+3'	Stadium: Bishan Stadium; Referee: Jansen Foo

16 July 2023 19	Albirex Niigata (S) (Japan)	3–1	(Singapore) Lion City Sailors	Jurong East
	Shodai Yokoyama 80'; Tadanari Lee 82'; Riku Fukashiro 90+5'	Report	Richairo Zivkovic 73' (pen.)	Stadium: Jurong East Stadium; Attendance: 2,497; Referee: Andrea Verolino; Man of the Match: Seia Kunori

20 July 2023 20 (Rescheduled)	Lion City Sailors (Singapore)	3–2	(Singapore) Tanjong Pagar United	Bishan
	Maxime Lestienne 20' 81' (pen.); Shawal Anuar 86'; Hafiz Nor (yellow card) 33'; Haiqal Pashia (yellow card) 95+1'	Report	Syukri Bashir 35' (pen.); Akram Azman 64'; Raihan Rahman (yellow card) 78'; Tajeli Salamat (yellow card) 84'	Stadium: Bishan Stadium; Referee: Clarence Leow Hong Wei; Man of the Match: Fashah Iskandar

31 July 2023 21 (Rescheduled)	Lion City Sailors (Singapore)	5–2	(Singapore) Balestier Khalsa	Bishan
	Richairo Zivkovic (penalty missed) 11 24'; Lionel Tan 35'; Bailey Wright 47' 74' (yellow card) 15'; Shawal Anuar 61'	Report	Ryoya Tanigushi (penalty missed) 17 27' (pen.); Shuhei Hoshino 60'	Stadium: Bishan Stadium; Referee: Hilmi Fuad; Man of the Match: Bailey Wright

4 August 2023 22	Tampines Rovers (Singapore)	2–5	(Singapore) Lion City Sailors	Tampines
	Miloš Zlatković 59'; Boris Kopitović 73' (pen.)	Report	Maxime Lestienne 9' 19' 34'; Richairo Zivkovic 77' 80'; Lionel Tan (yellow card) 22'; Bailey Wright (yellow card) 69'	Stadium: Our Tampines Hub; Referee: Farhad Mohamed; Man of the Match: Maxime Lestienne

13 August 2023 23	Hougang United (Singapore)	2–8	(Singapore) Lion City Sailors	Jalan Besar
	Richairo Zivkovic 27' (o.g.); Gabriel Quak 68'; Sahil Suhaimi (yellow card) 56'	Report	Diego Lopes 11'; Abdul Rasaq 24'; Richairo Zivkovic 47' 73'; Christopher van Huizen 61'; Maxime Lestienne 78' 83'; Haiqal Pashia 90+1'; Nur Adam Abdullah (yellow card) 20'	Stadium: Jalan Besar Stadium; Referee: Hilmi Fuad; Man of the Match: Maxime Lestienne

16 September 2023 24 (Rescheduled)	Lion City Sailors (Singapore)	3–1	(Singapore) Geylang International	Bishan
	Shawal Anuar 53'; Hami Syahin 62'; Haiqal Pashia 90+5'; Lionel Tan (red card) 71'	Report	Yushi Yamaya 31'; Hafiz Ahmad (yellow card) 45+1'	Stadium: Bishan Stadium; Referee: Farhad Mohamed

Pos	Team	Pld	W	D	L	GF	GA	GD	Pts	Qualification or relegation
1	Albirex Niigata (S) (Note: Three clubs – Albirex Niigata (S), DPMM FC and the FAS under-23 team Young Lions, are ineligible for any AFC competition spots.) (C)	24	20	2	2	86	20	+66	62	
2	Lion City Sailors (Q)	24	17	3	4	79	39	+40	54	Qualification for 2024-25 AFC Champions League Two Group Stage & ASEAN Club Championship
3	Tampines Rovers (Q)	24	14	6	4	47	32	+15	48	Qualification for 2024-25 AFC Champions League Two Group Stage
4	Balestier Khalsa	24	12	0	12	60	71	−11	36	
5	Geylang International	24	10	3	11	41	52	−11	33	
6	Hougang United	24	9	2	13	37	57	−20	29	
7	Brunei DPMM	24	6	5	13	39	43	−4	23	
8	Tanjong Pagar United	24	6	3	15	39	62	−23	21	
9	Young Lions	24	1	2	21	24	76	−52	5	

Source: Singapore Premier League
Rules for classification: 1) points; 2) goal difference; 3) number of goals scored; 4) number of wins
(C) Champions; (Q) Qualified for the phase indicated

=== Singapore Cup ===
Pos	Team	Pld	W	D	L	GF	GA	GD	Pts	Qualification
1	Lion City Sailors (Q)	3	2	1	0	12	2	+10	7	Semi-finals
2	Hougang United (Q)	3	1	1	1	5	5	0	4	Semi-finals
3	Balestier Khalsa	3	1	0	2	9	12	−3	3	
4	Tanjong Pagar United	3	1	0	2	5	12	−7	3	

Updated to match(es) played on 25 September 2023. Source: FAS
(Q) Qualified for the phase indicated

Win Draw Loss

25 September 2023 Group Match 1	Balestier Khalsa (Singapore)	0–7	(Singapore) Lion City Sailors	Bishan
	Jordan Emaviwe (yellow card) 58'	Report	Richairo Zivkovic 3', 11', 36'; Diego Lopes 19', 25', 46'; Adam Swandi 75'	Stadium: Bishan Stadium; Referee: Ahmad A"qashah

21 October 2023 Group Match 2	Lion City Sailors (Singapore)	4–1	(Singapore) Tanjong Pagar United	Bishan
	Diego Lopes 13' (pen.); Shawal Anuar 68', 78', 90+3'; Hami Syahin (yellow card) 52'; Anumanthan Kumar (yellow card) 52'; Hariss Harun (yellow card) 72'; Richairo Zivkovic (yellow card) 90'	Report	Naqiuddin Eunos 27'; Shakir Hamzah (yellow card) 14'; Blake Ricciuto (yellow card) 44' (yellow-red card) 48'; Akram Azman (yellow card) 47'; Tajeli Salamat (red card) 90'	Stadium: Bishan Stadium; Referee: Hilmi Fuad

25 November 2023 Group Match 3	Hougang United (Singapore)	1–1	(Singapore) Lion City Sailors	Jalan Besar
	Djordje Maksimovic 4'; Jordan Vestering (yellow card) 68'	Report	Shawal Anuar 84'; Hami Syahin (yellow card) 44'	Stadium: Jalan Besar Stadium; Referee: Syanqawi Buhari

3 December 2023 Semi Final Leg 1	Tampines Rovers (Singapore)	3–3	(Singapore) Lion City Sailors	Our Tampines Hub
	Joel Chew 3'; Faris Ramli 43'; Boris Kopitović 81'	Report	Anumanthan Kumar 6'; Bailey Wright 13'; Shawal Anuar 52'; Lionel Tan (yellow card) 33'; Zulqarnaen Suzliman (yellow card) 45'; Rusyaidi Salime (yellow card) 89'	Attendance: Tampines; Referee: Muhammad Taqi

6 December 2023 Semi Final Leg 2	Lion City Sailors (Singapore)	3–0	(Singapore) Tampines Rovers	Bishan
	Richairo Zivkovic 2', 59'; Diego Lopes 66'; Anumanthan Kumar (yellow card) 51'	Report	Miloš Zlatković (yellow card) 25'; Shah Shahiran (yellow card) 26' (yellow-red card) 90+1'; Irfan Najeeb (yellow card) 65'	Stadium: Bishan Stadium; Referee: Farhad Mohamed

Lion City Sailors won 6–3 on aggregate.

9 December 2023 Final	Hougang United (Singapore)	1–3	(Singapore) Lion City Sailors	Jalan Besar
	Kazuma Takayama 90+1'; Jordan Vestering (yellow card) 13'; Djordje Maksimovic (yellow card) 76'; Amy Recha (yellow card) 90+2'	Report	Richairo Zivkovic 27' (pen.); Maxime Lestienne 42'; Shawal Anuar 81'	Stadium: Jalan Besar Stadium; Referee: Andrea Verolino

=== AFC Champions League ===
Win Draw Loss

==== Group stage ====
Pos	Team	Pld	W	D	L	GF	GA	GD	Pts	Qualification	UTD	JBH	LCS	KIT
1	(Thailand) Bangkok United	6	4	1	1	11	8	+3	13	Advance to round of 16	—	3–2	1–0	1–1
2	(South Korea) Jeonbuk Hyundai Motors	6	4	0	2	12	9	+3	12	Advance to round of 16	3–2	—	3–0	2–1
3	(Singapore) Lion City Sailors	6	2	0	4	5	9	−4	6		1–2	2–0	—	0–2
4	(Hong Kong) Kitchee	6	1	1	4	7	9	−2	4		1–2	1–2	1–2	—

Source: AFC
Rules for classification: Tiebreakers

20 September 2023 Matchday 1	Lion City Sailors (Singapore)	1–2	(Thailand) Bangkok United	Jalan Besar, Singapore
	Diego Lopes 25'; Rui Pires (yellow card) 32'; Hami Syahin (yellow card) 78'	Report	Everton 51'; Thitiphan Puangchan 62'; Mahmoud Eid (yellow card) 25'; Peerapat Notchaiya (yellow card) 69'; Bassel Jradi (yellow card) 83'	Stadium: Jalan Besar Stadium; Attendance: 2,927; Referee: Sadullo Gulmurodi (Tajikistan)

4 October 2023 Matchday 2	Kitchee SC (Hong Kong)	1–2	(Singapore) Lion City Sailors	Causeway Bay, Hong Kong
	Jakob Jantscher 87'; Tan Chun Lok (yellow card) 76'	Report	Richairo Zivkovic 14' (yellow card) 16'; Maxime Lestienne 36' (pen.); Hariss Harun (yellow card) 41'; Anumanthan Kumar (yellow card) 63'; Manuel Herrera López (yellow card) 90+5'	Stadium: Hong Kong Stadium; Attendance: 3,077; Referee: Yoshimi Yamashita (Japan)

25 October 2023 Matchday 3	Jeonbuk Hyundai Motors (South Korea)	3–0	(Singapore) Lion City Sailors	Jeonju, Korea
	Jun Amano 5'; Lionel Tan 32' (o.g.); Moon Seon-min 57'	Report	Hariss Harun (yellow card) 18'; Richairo Zivkovic (yellow card) 33'; Manuel Herrera López (yellow card) 63'	Stadium: Jeonju World Cup Stadium; Attendance: 4,872; Referee: Khamis Al-Marri (Qatar)

8 November 2023 Matchday 4	Lion City Sailors (Singapore)	2–0	(South Korea) Jeonbuk Hyundai Motors	Jalan Besar, Singapore
	Richairo Zivkovic 23', 55'; Hafiz Nor (yellow card) 47'; Christopher van Huizen (yellow card) 78'; Manuel Herrera López (yellow card) 89'	Report	Jeong Tae-wook (yellow card) 52'; Moon Seon-min (yellow card) 66'; Gustavo (penalty missed) 89	Stadium: Jalan Besar Stadium; Attendance: 3,562; Referee: Mouood Bonyadifar (Iran)

29 November 2023 Matchday 5	Bangkok United (Thailand)	1–0	(Singapore) Lion City Sailors	Pathum Thani, Thailand
	Rungrath Poomchantuek 85'; Suphan Thongsong (yellow card) 31'		Pedro Henrique (yellow card) 26'; Rui Pires (yellow card) 89'; Maxime Lestienne (yellow card) 90+4'	Stadium: Thammasat Stadium; Referee: Casey Lisa Reibelt (Australia)

13 December 2023 Matchday 6	Lion City Sailors (Singapore)	0–2	(Hong Kong) Kitchee SC	Jalan Besar, Singapore
		Report	Christopher van Huizen 11' (o.g.); Fernando 74'; Tan Chun Lok (yellow card) 69'	Stadium: Jalan Besar Stadium; Referee: Ahmed Issa (United Arab Emirates)
