= Ryo Takahashi =

Ryo Takahashi may refer to:

- Ryo Takahashi (footballer, born 1993) (高橋 諒), Japanese footballer
- Ryo Takahashi (footballer, born 2000) (高橋 亮), Japanese footballer
- Ryō Takahashi (musician) (高橋諒, born 1985), Japanese musician and composer
