= Asahi Yokokawa =

Japanese footballer

Personal information
- Date of birth: 26 May 2002 (age 24)
- Place of birth: Odawara, Kanagawa, Japan
- Height: 1.75 m (5 ft 9 in)
- Positions: Central midfielder; right back

Youth career
- –2014: Ashiko SC
- 2015–2020: Shonan Bellmare

Senior career*
Years	Team	Apps	(Gls)
2021–2022	Shonan Bellmare	0	(0)
2021	→ Gainare Tottori (loan)	2	(0)
2022	→ Tokyo Musashino United (loan)	0	(0)
2023–2024	Albirex Niigata (S)	22	(4)
2024–2026	Heidelberg United	77	(19)

International career^{‡}
2017	Japan U15		
2018	Japan U16		
2019	Japan U17		
- * Club domestic league appearances and goals as of 19 September 2026 (UTC) ‡ National team caps and goals as of 20:17, 18 November 2021 (UTC)

Asahi Yokokawa (横川 旦陽, Yokokawa Asahi; born 26 May 2002) is a Japanese professional footballer who last played either as a central midfielder or right back for National Premier Leagues Victoria club Heidelberg United.

== Club career ==
=== Shonan Bellmare ===
In February 2021, Asahi was promoted to the J1 League senior squad of Shonon Bellmare.

==== Gainare Tottori (loan) ====
In 2021, Asahi was loaned to J3 League club, Gainare Tottori. He make his professional career debut on 14 November 2021 in a league match against Azul Claro Numazu.

==== Tokyo Musashino United (loan) ====
In 2022, Asahi was loaned to Tokyo Musashino United.

=== Albirex Niigata (S) ===
On 8 January 2023, Asahi move to Singapore to play for Albirex Niigata Singapore where he was named captain of the team throughout the 2023 season. On 11 August 2023, the club was declared the league champions and Asahi was honoured to lift the league title. Asahi was also named in the 2023 Singapore Premier League 'Team of the Year' in his first season at the club.

=== Heidelberg United ===
On 9 February 2024, Asahi moved to Australia to sign with National Premier Leagues Victoria club Heidelberg United. Asahi make his club debut the next day on 10 April in a league match against Altona Magic where he scored on his debut to seal the 3 points scoring the only goal in the match. On 16 March, he scored his second league goal in a 2–2 draw against Melbourne Sharks.

== Honours ==
=== Club ===
Albirex Niigata (S)

- Singapore Premier League: 2023
- Singapore Community Shield: 2023

Heidelberg United

- Australia Cup: 2025 (runners-up)

=== Individual ===
- Singapore Premier League Team of the Year: 2023

== Career statistics ==
=== Club ===
As of 21 Feb 2025.

Club	Season	League			National Cup		League Cup		Other		Total	
Club	Season	Division	Apps	Goals	Apps	Goals	Apps	Goals	Apps	Goals	Apps	Goals
Shonan Bellmare	2021	J1 League	0	0	0	0	0	0	0	0	0	0
Shonan Bellmare	2022	J1 League	0	0	0	0	0	0	0	0	0	0
Shonan Bellmare	Total		0	0	0	0	0	0	0	0	0	0
Gainare Tottori (loan)	2021	J3 League	2	0	1 (Note: Appearances in the Emperor's Cup)	0	–		0	0	3	0
Tokyo Musashino United (loan)	2022	JFL	0	0	0	0	–		0	0	0	0
Albirex Niigata (S)	2023	SPL	22	4	4	0	–		1	0	27	4
Heidelberg United	2024	NPLV	20	6	2	0	–		0	0	22	6
Heidelberg United	2025	NPLV	4	1	0	0	–		0	0	4	1
Heidelberg United	Total		24	6	2	0	0	0	0	0	26	7
Career total			48	0	1	0	0	0	0	0	56	0

== Honours ==
=== Club ===
Albirex Niigata (S)

- Singapore Premier League: 2023
- Singapore Community Shield: 2023

=== International ===
==== Japan U16 ====
- AFC U-16 Championship: 2018

=== Individual ===
Albirex Niigata (S)

- Singapore Premier League Team of the Year: 2023
