= Keito Komatsu =

Japanese footballer (born 2001)

Personal information
- Date of birth: 22 May 2000 (age 26)
- Place of birth: Saitama, Japan
- Height: 1.75 m (5 ft 9 in)
- Position: Forward

Youth career
- 2015: FC Tokyo Jugend
- 2016-2019: Aomori Yama High School
- 2019-2023: Tokoha University

Senior career*
Years	Team	Apps	(Gls)
2023–2024	Albirex Niigata (S)	23	(13)
- * Club domestic league appearances and goals as of 12:03, 15 March 2023 (UTC)

Keito Komatsu (小松 慧, born 22 May 2000), is a Japanese former professional footballer who last played as a striker for Singapore Premier League club Albirex Niigata (S). He retired in 2024 at the age of 23.

== Early career ==
Komatsu started his career at FC Tokyo Youth before enrolling at Aomori Yama High School who played in the Prince Takamado U18 Premier League East, a U18 league comprising select youth teams of J League teams and high schools. Komatsu studied at Tokoha University Hamatsu Campus where he was the captain of the school team from 2019 until 2023.

== Club career ==
=== Albirex Niigata Singapore ===
Komatsu joined Singaporean club Albirex Niigata (S) in January 2023 ahead of the 2023 Singapore Premier League season. He was mainly used as a substitute in his first year with the club. On 1 April 2023, Komatsu scored his first career professional goal against Geylang International. On 22 July 2023, Komatsu scored his first career hat-trick in the span of 17 minutes during the first half in a league match against Young Lions. In his first season, he helped the club to win the 2023 league title, and retired prior to the 2024 season.

== Honours ==
=== Club ===
Albirex Niigata (S)

- Singapore Premier League: 2023
- Singapore Community Shield: 2023

=== Individual ===
- Singapore Premier League Player of the Month: July 2023

== Career statistics ==
=== Club ===
As of 15 March 2023.

Appearances and goals by club, season and competition
Club	Season	League			Cup		Other		Total	
Club	Season	Division	Apps	Goals	Apps	Goals	Apps	Goals	Apps	Goals
Albirex Niigata (S)	2023	SPL	19	13	0	0	0	0	19	13
Career total			19	13	0	0	0	0	19	13
