= Shodai Yokoyama =

Japanese footballer (born 2001)

Personal information
- Date of birth: 14 October 2000 (age 26)
- Place of birth: Saitama, Japan
- Height: 1.70 m (5 ft 7 in)
- Positions: Attacking midfielder; winger

Team information
- Current team: BG Tampines Rovers

Youth career
- 2016–2018: Tokai University Sagami High School

College career
| Years | Team | Apps | (Gls) |
| 2019–2022 | Osaka University of Health & Sport Sciences | | |

Senior career*
| Years | Team | Apps | (Gls) |
| 2023 | Albirex Niigata (S) | 24 | (5) |
| 2024-2025 | Hougang United | 32 | (5) |
| 2025–2026 | Geylang International | 19 | (2) |
| 2026– | BG Tampines Rovers | | |
- * Club domestic league appearances and goals as of 12 September 2024

Shodai Yokoyama (横山 翔大, Yokoyama Shodai, born 14 October 2000) is a Japanese professional footballer who plays as an attacking-midfielder for Singapore Premier League club BG Tampines Rovers. Mainly an attacking-midfielder, he is also capable of playing as a winger and occasionally a left-back.

== Club career ==
=== Youth career ===
Yokoyama was born in Kanagawa Prefecture, Japan. He began his youth career with SFAT ISEHARA SC before moving to Tokai University Sagamihara High School. After graduating from high school, he joined the Osaka University of Health & Sport Sciences.

=== Albirex Niigata Singapore ===
In January 2023, Yokoyama signed his first professional contract with Singapore Premier League club, Albirex Niigata (S). He made his professional debut on 19 February 2023 in the 2023 Singapore Community Shield against Hougang United. He came on as a substitute in the 63rd minute and helped his team win 3–0. Yokoyama made his Singapore Premier League debut on 25 February against the Young Lions. He came on as a substitute in the 75th minute and helped his team win 3–0. Yokoyama scored his first professional career goal in a 6–1 thrashing win over Geylang International on 1 April.

=== Hougang United ===
Yokoyama then joined Hougang United on 10 February 2024. He make his debut on 10 May in a 1–4 home lost to Lion City Sailors.

=== Geylang International ===
On 7 July 2025, Yokoyama alongside Hougang United captain, Nazrul Nazari, joined Geylang International after the expiration of their contract.

== Honours ==
=== Club ===
Albirex Niigata (S)

- Singapore Premier League: 2023
- Singapore Community Shield: 2023

== Career statistics ==
=== Club ===
As of 7 July 2025.

Appearances and goals by club, season and competition
| Club | Season | League | | | Cup | | Community Shield | | AFC Competition | | Total | |
| Club | Season | Division | Apps | Goals | Apps | Goals | Apps | Goals | Apps | Goals | Apps | Goals |
|---|---|---|---|---|---|---|---|---|---|---|---|---|
| Albirex Niigata (S) | 2023 | Singapore Premier League | 24 | 5 | 4 | 1 | 1 | 1 | 0 | 0 | 29 | 7 |
| Hougang United | 2024–25 | Singapore Premier League | 32 | 5 | 4 | 1 | 0 | 0 | 0 | 0 | 36 | 6 |
| Geylang International | 2025–26 | Singapore Premier League | 19 | 2 | 4 | 0 | 0 | 0 | 0 | 0 | 23 | 2 |
| BG Tampines Rovers | 2026–27 | Singapore Premier League | 0 | 0 | 0 | 0 | 0 | 0 | 0 | 0 | 0 | 0 |
| Career total | | | 75 | 12 | 12 | 2 | 1 | 1 | 0 | 0 | 78 | 15 |
