= Ryo Takahashi (footballer, born 2000) =

Japanese footballer

Personal information
- Date of birth: 11 July 2000 (age 26)
- Place of birth: Tokyo, Japan
- Height: 1.77 m (5 ft 10 in)
- Position: Defender

Team information
- Current team: Langwarrin SC
- Number: 2

Youth career
- 2016–2018: FC Tokyo
- 2019–2022: Toyo University

Senior career*
Years	Team	Apps	(Gls)
2018	FC Tokyo U-23	18	(0)
2018	FC Tokyo	0	(0)
2023	Albirex Niigata (S)	18	(2)
2024–	Langwarrin SC	0	(0)
- * Club domestic league appearances and goals

Ryo Takahashi (高橋 亮, Takahashi Ryō; born 11 July 2000) is a Japanese football player currently playing as a defender for Langwarrin SC.

== Club career ==
=== FC Tokyo ===
Ryo was an academy product of J1 League club FC Tokyo where he got promoted to the senior squad in the 2018 season. Subsequently, he was also featured in FC Tokyo U-23 squad playing in the J3 League.

=== Albirex Niigata (S) ===
While studying, Ryo also featured in Toyo University school team from 2019 to 2022.

On 5 January 2023, Ryo moved to Singapore to sign with Albirex Niigata (S). He make his debut on 19 February 2023 in the 2023 Singapore Community Shield where he won the award. On 9 March 2023, Ryo scored and provided the assist in a 4-0 win against league rivals, Lion City Sailors. Ryo would then help the club to defence the league title in his debut season.

== Honours ==
=== Club ===
Albirex Niigata (S)

- Singapore Premier League: 2023
- Singapore Community Shield: 2023

== Career statistics ==
=== Club ===
As of 8 January 2023.

Club	Season	League			National Cup		League Cup		Other		Total	
Club	Season	Division	Apps	Goals	Apps	Goals	Apps	Goals	Apps	Goals	Apps	Goals
FC Tokyo U-23	2018	J3 League	18	0	–		–		0	0	18	0
FC Tokyo	2018	J1 League	0	0	0	0	1 (Note: Appearances in the J.League Cup)	0	0	0	1	0
Albirex Niigata (S)	2023	SPL	0	0	0	0	–		0	0	0	0
Langwarrin SC	2024	VPL	0	0	0	0	–		0	0	0	0
Career total			18	0	0	0	1	0	0	0	19	0
