= Junki Kenn Yoshimura =

Singaporean footballer

Personal information
- Date of birth: 20 July 2004 (age 22)
- Place of birth: Singapore
- Height: 1.77 m (5 ft 10 in)
- Position: Right midfielder

Team information
- Current team: Young Lions (on loan from Albirex Niigata (S))
- Number: 22

Youth career
- –2019: Singapore Sports School
- 2020–2021: Albirex Niigata (S)

Senior career*
Years	Team	Apps	(Gls)
2021–	Albirex Niigata (S)	48	(2)
2025–	→ Young Lions (loan)	0	(0)

International career
2019–2021	Singapore U16	3	(0)
2022–	Singapore U19	1	(0)
- * Club domestic league appearances and goals as of 15:04, 28 August 2021 (UTC)

Junki Kenn Yoshimura (ジュンキ, Yoshimura Junki Kenn; born 20 July 2004) is a Singaporean footballer currently playing as a right-midfielder for Singapore Premier League club, Young Lions on loan from Albirex Niigata (S).

== Club career ==
=== Albirex Niigata Singapore ===
Junki spent his time studying at the Singapore Sports School before joining Albirex Niigata (S) U-17 team in 2020. He was then promoted to the senior squad in 2021. On 10 December 2022, Junki signed a contract extension for the 2023 season where he would then go on to have his breakout season being used as a starter throughout the entire league matches. On 11 December 2023, he renewed his contract with the club for another year until the end of 2024.

==== Young Lions (loan) ====
On 14 August 2025, Junki was loaned out to Young Lions for the season.

== International career ==
Junki represented Singapore at the 2022 AFF U-19 Youth Championship in Indonesia.

== Honours ==
=== Club ===
Albirex Niigata (S)

- Singapore Premier League: 2022, 2023
- Singapore Community Shield: 2023

== Career statistics ==
=== Club ===
As of 20 Jan 2025

Club	Season	League			Cup		Other		Total	
Club	Season	Division	Apps	Goals	Apps	Goals	Apps	Goals	Apps	Goals
Albirex Niigata (S)	2021	Singapore Premier League	1	0	0	0	0	0	1	0
Albirex Niigata (S)	2022	Singapore Premier League	1	0	1	0	0	0	2	0
Albirex Niigata (S)	2023	Singapore Premier League	17	0	0	0	0	0	17	0
Career total			19	0	1	0	0	0	20	0
