= Shuto Komaki =

Japanese footballer (born 2001)

Personal information
- Date of birth: 30 May 2000 (age 26)
- Place of birth: Saitama, Japan
- Height: 1.70 m (5 ft 7 in)
- Position: Forward

Team information
- Current team: Kaya–Iloilo
- Number: 14

Youth career
- –2016: Sorriso Kumamoto
- 2016–2019: Roasso Kumamoto

College career
| Years | Team | Apps | (Gls) |
| 2019–2022 | Kyushu Sangyo University | | |

Senior career*
| Years | Team | Apps | (Gls) |
| 2023–2024 | Albirex Niigata (S) | 24 | (4) |
| 2024– | Kaya–Iloilo | 36 | (25) |
- * Club domestic league appearances and goals as of 21 February 2026

Shuto Komaki (駒木 秀人, born 30 May 2000) is a Japanese professional footballer who plays for Philippines Football League club Kaya–Iloilo.

Komaki is a winger with an additional focus on dribbling and passing. He is also a finisher.

== Club career ==
=== Youth ===
Komaki was born in Kumamoto Prefecture, Japan. He began playing football at a young age and joined the youth academy of Sorriso Kumamoto. In 2016, he moved to the youth academy of J2 League club, Roasso Kumamoto.

In 2019, Komaki joined Kyushu Sangyo University. He played for the university's football team for four years and was a key player for the team.

=== Albirex Niigata (S) ===
Komaki signed his first professional contract with Albirex Niigata (S) in January 2023. He made his professional debut on 19 February 2023 in the Singapore Community Shield match against Hougang United. He came on as a substitute in the 76th minute and helped his team to win the match 3–0. Komaki scored his first goal for the club on 25 February 2023 in the league match against the Young Lions. Komaki helped the club to retain the league title thus winning his first career major trophy.

=== Kaya–Iloilo ===
On 3 February 2024, Komaki moved to Philippines Football League club, Kaya–Iloilo on a free transfer. He made his debut for the club on 7 April against rivals, United City in a 2–0 win. In the next league match on 13 April, he scored 2 goals and got 1 assists in a thrashing 12–0 win against DB Garelli United. In the next match on 21 April, Komaki scored his first eve career hat-trick where he also recorded a brace of assist in a 10–1 win over Maharlika Taguig. Komaki helped his club to win the league title in his first season.

During the 2024–25 AFC Champions League Two on 28 November 2024, Shuto Komaki scored in the 18th minute for the team as his team made history after drawing 1–1 at home against J1 League club Sanfrecce Hiroshima ending their four winning streak in the group stage.

== Honours ==
=== Club ===
Albirex Niigata (S)

- Singapore Premier League: 2023
- Singapore Community Shield: 2023

==== Kaya–Iloilo ====
- Philippines Football League: 2024, 2024–25

== Career statistics ==
=== Club ===
As of 9 Dec 2024.

Appearances and goals by club, season and competition
| Club | Season | League | | | Cup | | Asia | | Other / AFF | | Total | |
| Club | Season | Division | Apps | Goals | Apps | Goals | Apps | Goals | Apps | Goals | Apps | Goals |
|---|---|---|---|---|---|---|---|---|---|---|---|---|
| Albirex Niigata (S) | 2023 | Singapore Premier League | 24 | 8 | 2 | 0 | 0 | 0 | 1 | 0 | 27 | 8 |
| Kaya–Iloilo | 2024 | Philippines Football League | 13 | 10 | 0 | 0 | 2 | 0 | 2 | 0 | 17 | 10 |
| Kaya–Iloilo | 2024–25 | Philippines Football League | 6 | 7 | 0 | 0 | 6 | 1 | 2 | 0 | 12 | 8 |
| Career total | | | 43 | 25 | 2 | 0 | 8 | 1 | 5 | 0 | 58 | 27 |
