= Kaisei Ogawa =

Japanese footballer (born 2001)

Personal information
- Date of birth: 25 February 2001 (age 25)
- Place of birth: Tokyo, Japan
- Height: 1.80 m (5 ft 11 in)
- Position: Midfielder

Team information
- Current team: Geylang International
- Number: 22

Youth career
- Christroi SC
- Yokogawa Musashino

College career
Years	Team	Apps	(Gls)
2019–2022	Takushoku University		

Senior career*
Years	Team	Apps	(Gls)
2023	Albirex Niigata (S)	27	(9)
2024–2025	Young Lions	32	(2)
2025–	Geylang International	0	(0)
- * Club domestic league appearances and goals as of 12:03, 15 March 2023 (UTC)

Kaisei Ogawa (小川 開世, born 25 February 2001), is a Japanese professional footballer who currently plays as a midfielder for Singapore Premier League club Geylang International.

== Club career ==
=== Youth ===
Born in Tokyo, Kaisei began his youth career with local side Christroi SC, before moving to Yokogawa Musashino's youth set-up during his teenage years. In 2019, he joined Takushoku University.

=== Albirex Niigata (S) ===
On 7 January 2023, Kaisei was recruited to joined Singaporean club Albirex Niigata (S) from Takushoku University together with Shunsaku Kishimoto and Riku Fukashiro ahead of the 2023 Singapore Premier League season. He made his debut for the club on 8 January 2023 in a Singapore Community Shield match against Hougang United. Along the season, he quickly became a regular starter for the team and was one of their key players in their title-winning campaign. Kaisei was one of the key players in the match against Lion City Sailors during the opening game, scoring a free kick against the sailors. Ogawa would go on to collect his Singapore Premier League champions medal at the end of the season. He soon left the club on 4th of December 2023.

=== Young Lions ===
Kaisei joined local outfit Young Lions ahead of the 2024–25 Singapore Premier League season. During the final group stage match on 2024–25 Singapore Cup on 28 March 2025, Kaisei scored four goals in one match in a 7–1 thrashing win against Hougang United becoming the second player in the club history to score four goals in a single match. Kaisei went on to finished the season with 7 goals and 9 assists in 36 appearances for the club.

=== Geylang International ===
On 2 July 2025, Kaisei joined Geylang International on a permanent contract reuniting with Riku Fukashiro at the club.

== Honours ==
=== Club ===
Albirex Niigata (S)

- Singapore Premier League: 2023
- Singapore Community Shield: 2023

== Career statistics ==
=== Club ===
As of 1 Nov 26.

Appearances and goals by club, season and competition
Club	Season	League			Cup		Other		Total	
Club	Season	Division	Apps	Goals	Apps	Goals	Apps	Goals	Apps	Goals
Albirex Niigata (S)	2023	SPL	23	8	3	0	1	1	27	9
Albirex Niigata (S)	Total		23	8	3	0	1	1	27	9
Young Lions FC	2024–25	SPL	32	2	4	5	0	0	36	7
Young Lions FC	Total		32	2	4	5	0	0	36	7
Geylang International	2025–26	SPL	19	1	4	0	0	0	23	1
Geylang International	2026–27	SPL	6	1	0	0	0	0	6	1
Geylang International	Total		25	2	4	0	0	0	29	2
Career total			79	12	11	5	1	1	91	18
