= Riku Fukashiro =

Japanese footballer (born 2000)

Personal information
- Full name: Riku Fukashiro
- Date of birth: 12 April 2000 (age 26)
- Place of birth: Saitama, Japan
- Height: 1.68 m (5 ft 6 in)
- Position: Forward

Youth career
- 2016–2018: Seibudai High School

College career
Years	Team	Apps	(Gls)
2019–2022	Takushoku University		

Senior career*
Years	Team	Apps	(Gls)
2023	Albirex Niigata (S)	27	(9)
2024–2025	Balestier Khalsa	32	(8)
2025-2026	Geylang International	20	(6)
- * Club domestic league appearances and goals as of 1 July 2025

Riku Fukashiro (深代 陸, born 12 April 2000), is a Japanese professional footballer who most recently played as a winger for Singapore Premier League club Geylang International.

== Club career ==
=== Albirex Niigata (S) ===
Riku joined Singaporean club Albirex Niigata (S) in January 2023 for the 2023 season. Riku was recruited as a white swan in 2023 from Takushoku University together with Shunsaku Kishimoto and Kaisei Ogawa. He has been mainly used as a substitute, as a winger on the left side, in his first year with the club. He scored his "official" first goal against Geylang International on 1 April 2023 Riku scored a brace in the next match against Balestier Khalsa to announce his official arrival in the league. He is also one of the 3 scorers who help the Swans to overcome the Sailors 3–1 in a title show down match. Riku was named in the SPL Team Of The Week 24.

=== Balestier Khalsa ===
On 19 January 2024, Riku signed for Balestier Khalsa for the 2024–25 season. He went on to score 8 goals and rack up 10 assists in 36 appearances for the club.

=== Geylang International ===
On 1 July 2025, Riku signed for Geylang International.

== Honours ==
=== Club ===
Albirex Niigata (S)

- Singapore Premier League: 2023
- Singapore Community Shield: 2023

== Career statistics ==
=== Club ===
As of 1 July 2026.

Appearances and goals by club, season and competition
Club	Season	League			Cup		Other		Total	
Club	Season	Division	Apps	Goals	Apps	Goals	Apps	Goals	Apps	Goals
Albirex Niigata (S)	2023	SPL	24	8	4	0	1	1	29	9
Albirex Niigata (S)	Total		24	8	4	0	1	1	29	9
Balestier Khalsa	2024–25	SPL	32	8	4	0	0	0	36	8
Balestier Khalsa	Total		32	8	4	0	0	0	36	8
Geylang International	2025–26	SPL	15	4	4	2	0	0	19	6
Geylang International	Total		15	4	4	2	0	0	19	6
Tanjong Pagar United	2026–27	SPL	0	0	0	0	0	0	0	0
Tanjong Pagar United	Total		0	0	0	0	0	0	0	0
Career total			71	20	12	2	1	1	84	23
