= Tadanari Lee =

Zainichi Korean footballer (born 1985)

Tadanari Lee 李 忠成
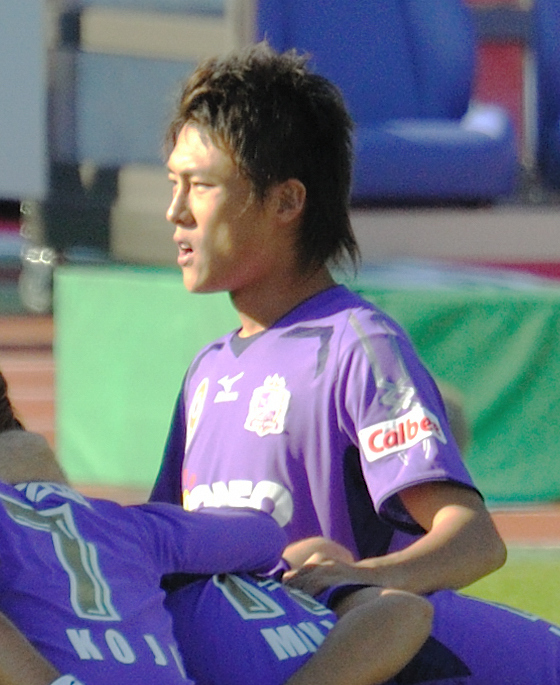
- Lee with Sanfrecce Hiroshima in 2010

Personal information
- Full name: Tadanari Lee
- Date of birth: 19 December 1985 (age 40)
- Place of birth: Nishitokyo, Tokyo, Japan
- Height: 1.82 m (6 ft 0 in)
- Positions: Striker; attacking midfielder

Team information
- Current team: Tampines Rovers (vice chairman and sporting director)

Youth career
- 1998–2000: Yokogawa Electric
- 2001–2003: FC Tokyo

Senior career*
Years	Team	Apps	(Gls)
2004	FC Tokyo	0	(0)
2005–2009	Kashiwa Reysol	108	(24)
2009–2011	Sanfrecce Hiroshima	70	(26)
2012–2014	Southampton	7	(1)
2013	→ FC Tokyo (loan)	13	(4)
2014–2018	Urawa Red Diamonds	133	(24)
2019	Yokohama F. Marinos	10	(1)
2020–2021	Kyoto Sanga	22	(0)
2022–2023	Albirex Niigata (S)	45	(21)
Total		408	(101)

International career
2007–2008	Japan U23	12	(4)
2011–2012	Japan	11	(2)
Medal record
Representing Japan
AFC Asian Cup
Gold medal – first place	2011 Qatar
- * Club domestic league appearances and goals

- Tadanari Lee
- Hangul: 이충성
- Hanja: 李忠成
- RR: I Chungseong
- MR: I Ch'ungsŏng
- Japanese name: Lee Tadanari (李忠成)

Tadanari Lee (李 忠成, Ri Tadanari; born 19 December 1985) is a Japanese football executive and former player who played as a striker or attacking midfielder. He is currently the vice chairman and sporting director of Singapore Premier League club Tampines Rovers.

Lee has made 11 appearances for the Japan national team. He is known in Japan for coming on as a substitute in the 109th minute of the 2011 AFC Asian Cup final held in Qatar and scoring his first international goal to secure a 1–0 win over Australia, giving Japan their fourth AFC Asian Cup success.

Lee is sometimes known as "Chung", in reference to his Korean name, Lee Chung-seong.

== Early life and family ==
Lee was born to third generation Zainichi Korean parents in Tanashi (present-day Nishitokyo), Tokyo. He has Byeokjin Lee (벽진이씨) ancestry. His father was also a footballer, who played for Yokohama Tristar FC in the Japan Soccer League.

His Korean name is Lee Chung-seong (Korean: 이충성; Hanja: 李忠成) where his former name was known as Tadanari Ōyama (大山 忠成, Ōyama Tadanari).

== Club career ==
=== Japan ===
Lee started playing football at Komine FC and later moved to Yokogawa Electric. In 2001, he joined FC Tokyo youth team and took second places at All Japan Club Youth Soccer tournament, Prince Takamado Cup and J.League Youth tournament. He briefly joined training squads for the South Korea U-19 and U-20 teams but not played at official games. He experienced severe discrimination from Korean teammates referring to him as a ban-jjokbari (half-Jap) with strong racial undertones.

He was promoted to FC Tokyo in 2004 and moved to Kashiwa Reysol in 2005 and later joined Sanfrecce Hiroshima in 2009.

=== Southampton ===
On 11 January 2012, Lee secured a work permit to allow him to play for Southampton, who confirmed the free transfer on 25 January 2012.

He made his debut for Southampton on 28 January 2012, as a substitute in a fourth round FA Cup match against Millwall. Lee started and played the duration of the replay, failing to score as Millwall won 3–2 after a 92nd-minute winner from Liam Feeney.

He scored his first goal for Southampton in a 4–0 victory over Derby County on 18 February, with a "venomous strike into the far corner" of the goal. He made his first league start one week later, a 3–0 victory away at Watford, with Lee winning a penalty for the third goal scored by Rickie Lambert. After damaging ligaments on 10 March 2012 Lee missed the rest of the season.

His goal won the Southampton's Goal of the Season Award.

After 5 months out injured, he made his return to action with a goal in a 4–1 victory at Stevenage in the League Cup.

He was handed the number 19 shirt for the 2013–14 season after Southampton invited him back to the First Team. He made his first return to the Southampton team after year when starting in the League Cup against Bristol City.

On 14 January 2014 he was released from his contract at Southampton after a two-year spell.

=== Return to Japan ===
On 14 February 2013, Lee returned to his former club, FC Tokyo on loan until the end of June. He made his debut on 2 March 2013, coming on as a 72nd-minute substitutee. He scored his first goal for the club on 23 March 2013 in the 77th minute against two-time defending champion Kashima Antlers.

=== Urawa Red Diamonds ===
He had a successful spell with Urawa Red Diamonds winning the 2016 J.League Cup, 2017 Suruga Bank Championship, 2017 AFC Champions League and the 2018 Emperor's Cup.

=== Albirex Niigata Singapore ===
After nine years in Japan, on 1 January 2022, Lee joined Singapore-based Albirex Niigata (S) on a one-year deal reportedly earning SGD$12,000 per month.l, of which he will donate all of his goal bonus pay-outs, worth $200 per goal, to SportCares. On 19 January 2022, he made his debut in the 2022 Singapore Community Shield, netting a penalty in a 2–1 loss to reigning 2021 Singapore Premier League champions, Lion City Sailors.

He ended the 2022 season winning the 2022 Singapore Premier League title. On 12 December 2022, he extended his contract for another season, for the 20th year of his professional career playing in the 2023 Singapore Premier League season. On 14 September 2023, Lee announced via the club official page that he will retired at the end of the season. On the final league fixture against Hougang United on 16 September 2023, Lee Tadanari scored 2 goals (a brace) in the match between Hougang United vs Alibrex Niigata (S) he scored at the 49th and the 69th minute sealing the match

== International career ==
In August 2008, Lee was selected Japan U-23 national team for 2008 Summer Olympics. At this tournament, he played all 3 matches.

After becoming a regular starter for Sanfrecce and finishing the 2010 season strongly, Lee was rewarded with a call-up to Japan's 2011 Asian Cup squad and made his full international debut on 9 January 2011 against Jordan. His first international goal was in the 109th minute of the final to secure a 1–0 win over Australia and Japan's fourth AFC Asian Cup success.

== Sporting director role ==
On 13 December 2025, Singapore Premier League club Tampines Rovers announced that Lee will become the club vice chairman and sporting director. Lee managed the club's player recruitment for the season. He progressed through the group stage of the AFC Champions League Two to reach the round of 16. Lee led the team’s performances and winning results throughout the group stage.

== Career statistics ==
=== Club ===
Appearances and goals by club, season and competition
Club	Season	League			National Cup		League Cup		Other		Total	
Club	Season	Division	Apps	Goals	Apps	Goals	Apps	Goals	Apps	Goals	Apps	Goals
FC Tokyo	2004	J1 League	0	0	—		—		—		0	0
Kashiwa Reysol	2005	J1 League	8	0	—		3	0	—		11	0
Kashiwa Reysol	2006	J2 League	31	8	—		—		—		31	8
Kashiwa Reysol	2007	J1 League	30	10	1	0	5	0	—		36	10
Kashiwa Reysol	2008	J1 League	19	4	4	1	4	0	—		27	5
Kashiwa Reysol	2009	J1 League	20	2	—		5	3	—		25	5
Kashiwa Reysol	Total		108	24	5	1	17	3	—		130	28
Sanfrecce Hiroshima	2009	J1 League	8	0	2	0	—		—		10	0
Sanfrecce Hiroshima	2010	J1 League	30	11	2	0	3	2	6	3	41	16
Sanfrecce Hiroshima	2011	J1 League	32	15	—		1	0	—		33	15
Sanfrecce Hiroshima	Total		70	26	4	0	4	2	6	3	84	31
Southampton	2011–12	Championship	7	1	2	0	—		—		9	1
Southampton	2012–13	Premier League	0	0	1	0	2	1	—		3	1
Southampton	2013–14	Premier League	0	0	0	0	2	0	—		2	0
Southampton	Total		7	1	3	0	4	1	—		14	2
FC Tokyo (loan)	2013	J1 League	13	4	—		6	2	—		19	6
Urawa Reds	2014	J1 League	34	6	0	0	8	3	0	0	42	9
Urawa Reds	2015	J1 League	25	2	2	1	2	1	5	0	34	4
Urawa Reds	2016	J1 League	33	10	1	0	5	2	5	2	44	14
Urawa Reds	2017	J1 League	21	3	0	0	1	0	10	4	32	7
Urawa Reds	2018	J1 League	20	3	2	0	8	2	—		30	5
Urawa Reds	Total		133	24	5	1	24	8	20	6	182	39
Yokohama F. Marinos	2019	J1 League	10	1	0	0	0	0	—		10	1
Kyoto Sanga	2020	J2 League	5	0	0	0	0	0	—		5	0
Kyoto Sanga	2021	J2 League	17	0	0	0	0	0	—		17	0
Kyoto Sanga	Total		22	0	0	0	0	0	—		22	0
Albirex Niigata (S)	2022	Singapore Premier League	22	10	6	1	1	1	—		29	12
Albirex Niigata (S)	2023	Singapore Premier League	23	11	4	0	1	0	—		28	11
Albirex Niigata (S)	Total		45	21	10	1	2	1	—		57	23
Career total			408	101	27	3	57	17	26	9	518	130

=== International ===
Appearances and goals by national team and year
National team	Year	Apps	Goals
Japan	2011	10	2
Japan	2012	1	0
Total		11	2

Japan score listed first, score column indicates score after each Lee goal.

List of international goals scored by Tadanari Lee
No.	Date	Venue	Cap	Opponent	Score	Result	Competition	Ref.
1	29 January 2011	Khalifa International Stadium, Doha, Qatar	2	Australia	1–0	1–0	2011 AFC Asian Cup	
2	7 October 2011	Kobe Wing Stadium, Kobe, Japan	8	Vietnam	1–0	1–0	Friendly	

== Honours ==
Sanfrecce Hiroshima

- J.League Cup runner-up: 2010

Southampton

- EFL Championship runner-up: 2011–12

Urawa Red Diamonds

- J.League Cup: 2016
- Suruga Bank Championship: 2017
- AFC Champions League: 2017
- Emperor's Cup: 2018

Yokohama F. Marinos

- J1 League: 2019

Albirex Niigata (S)

- Singapore Premier League: 2022, 2023
- Singapore Community Shield: 2023

Japan

- AFC Asian Cup: 2011
- Kirin Cup: 2011
