= Nicky Melvin Singh =

Singaporean footballer

Personal information
- Date of birth: 13 June 2002 (age 24)
- Place of birth: Singapore
- Height: 1.76 m (5 ft 9 in)
- Positions: Winger; forward

Team information
- Current team: FC Jurong
- Number: 22

Youth career
- Griffiths Primary School
- Sengkang Secondary School
- –2018: NFA
- 2019–2020: Tampines Rovers

Senior career*
Years	Team	Apps	(Gls)
2021–	FC Jurong	42	(4)

International career
2019	Singapore U19	2	(0)
2021–	Singapore U23	6	(1)
- * Club domestic league appearances and goals as of 13 March 2021

Nicky Melvin Singh (born 13 June 2002) is a Singaporean professional footballer who plays as a forward or winger for FC Jurong.

== Club career ==
Nicky began his professional career by signing for Singapore Premier League side Albirex Niigata (S) on 22 January 2021. On 13 March 2021, Nicky made his professional debut with Albirex Niigata (S) against Hougang United, playing 75 minutes.

On 15 May 2021, Nicky scored his first-ever professional goal against the Young Lions in the 2021 Singapore Premier League, a 2–1 win. In the 2023 season, Nicky was appointed as the vice-captain. On 1 July 2023, Nicky played his final match for the club against Young Lions, scoring a spectacular left-footed goal, contributing to a 4–2 win.

== Personal life ==
Nicky was born to a Singaporean father of Punjabi Indian descent and a Filipina mother. This heritage makes him eligible to represent Singapore, India or the Philippines at international level. He chose the Singapore national under-23 football team. He has represented the Lion City at both the 2021 SEA Games in Hanoi and 2023 SEA Games in Cambodia, where he scored once.

Nicky also has represented the National University of Singapore, winning the Institute-Varsity-Polytechnic (IVP) Games for football in 2025.

== Career statistics ==
Club	Season	League			Cup		Other		Total	
Club	Season	Division	Apps	Goals	Apps	Goals	Apps	Goals	Apps	Goals
Albirex Niigata (S)	2021	Singapore Premier League	13	1	0	0	0	0	13	1
Albirex Niigata (S)	2022	Singapore Premier League	14	0	6	0	0	0	20	0
Albirex Niigata (S)	2023	Singapore Premier League	9	1	0	0	0	0	9	1
Albirex Niigata (S)	Total		36	2	6	0	0	0	42	2

== Honours ==
Albirex Niigata (S)

- Singapore Premier League: 2022, 2023
- Singapore Community Shield: 2023
- FAS Centre of Excellence (COE) Under-21 League top scorer: 2022
