= 2026–27 BG Tampines Rovers FC season =

Tampines Rovers
2026–27 season
- Chairman: Shungo Sakamoto
- Head Coach: (Singapore) Nazri Nasir
- Ground: Our Tampines Hub
- Top goalscorer: League: TBD; All: TBD
- Highest home attendance: TBD
- Lowest home attendance: TBD
- Average home league attendance: TBD
Home colours	Away colours

The 2026–27 season season is Tampines Rovers's 9th season in the Singapore Premier League, their 31st consecutive season at the top level of Singapore football and 81st year in existence as a football club. It is also the club's fourthseason to be known as BG Tampines Rovers as part of a three-year collaboration with Thailand's BG Pathum United, until the end of the 2025–26 season.

Tampines Rovers will also participate in this season's editions of the Singapore Cup, AFC Champions League Two and the ASEAN Club Championship.

== Season preview ==
William Phang had stepped down from his position within the club at the end of last season and had since left the club. Club Legend, Nazri Nasir has been appointed as the new head coach on a 1-year contract. Former Selangor Assistant Coach, Jun Marques Davidson has joined the club as Assistant Coach. It isn't just homecoming for Nazri Nasir, but former Youth Goalkeeper Coach, Ng Wei Xian has returned to the club to be the senior team goalkeeper coach. The club appointed Nazri Nasir as head coach for the season, marking its sixth coaching appointment in 13 months.

Tampines Rovers also competed in the 2026–27 AFC Champions League Two and were drawn in Group G alongside Japan's FC Machida Zelvia, China's Shanghai Shenhua and Cambodia's Preah Khan Reach Svay Rieng.

Ahead of the 2026–27 season, Trent Buhagiar left the club. Glenn Kweh joined Lion City Sailors FC, while Shuya Yamashita joined Young Lions FC on a permanent transfer. Joel Chew also joined Young Lions on loan.

Meanwhile, Kenshin Yamazaki joined from Fujieda MYFC, Yuma Kimura joined from Renofa Yamaguchi FC, and Shodai Yokoyama joined from Geylang International FC. Later, Nabel Yoshitaka Furusawa joined on loan from Kashiwa Reysol, while Irfan Fandi signed a short-term contract after playing in Thailand.

In August 2026, the club announced a three-year partnership with FC Machida Zelvia. The partnership runs from 1 July 2026 to 30 June 2029 and aims to implement joint programmes in football business, share knowledge, and create domestic and international business opportunities.

Ahead of the season, Tampines Rovers travelled to Indonesia after being invited to participate in the 2026 Piala Presiden. They faced Persib Bandung, Arema and DPMM.

On 6 September 2026, Tampines Rovers faced Lion City Sailors in the Singapore Community Shield. They lost 2–0 after Ilhan Fandi scored in the 17th and 26th minutes. Tampines created several chances, including a Seiga Sumi effort that struck the crossbar, but failed to score.

On 11 September 2026, Tampines Rovers began their Singapore Premier League campaign with a 2–0 win over Balestier Khalsa FC. Tajeli Salamat's own goal gave Tampines the lead in the 28th minute, before Hide Higashikawa headed in Shodai Yokoyama's cross in the 86th minute to seal the victory.

On 17 September 2026, Tampines Rovers played Shanghai Shenhua in their opening Group G match of the 2026–27 AFC Champions League Two. Xu Haoyang gave Shanghai Shenhua the lead in the 19th minute before Faris Ramli equalised in the 33rd minute. Yang Shuai scored the winning goal in the 62nd minute as Tampines lost 2–1.

== Squad ==
=== Singapore Premier League / Singapore Premier League 2 ===
As of 1 January 2026

No.	Name	Nationality	Date of Birth (Age)	Last club	Contract Since	Contract End
Goalkeepers
24	Syazwan Buhari (C)	(Singapore)	22 September 1992 (age 34)	(Singapore) Geylang International	2018	2027
28	Zharfan Rohaizad	(Singapore)	21 February 1997 (age 29)	(Singapore) Lion City Sailors	2026	2027
30	Haziq Amirudin	(Singapore)	19 March 2009 (age 17)	(Singapore) Tampines Rovers U17	2025	2027
43	Luthfi Sufaiqish	(Singapore)		(Singapore) Sailors Development U17	2025	2027
52	Jarec Ng Rui Le	(Singapore)	25 January 2008 (age 18)	(Singapore) Tampines Rovers U21	2025	2027
Defenders
2	Raoul Suhaimi	(Singapore)	18 September 2005 (age 21)	(Singapore) Young Lions	2025	2027
5	Amirul Adli	(Singapore)	13 January 1996 (age 30)	(Malaysia) Negeri Sembilan (M1)	2024	2027
6	Jacob Mahler	(Singapore) (Denmark)	10 April 2000 (age 26)	(Thailand) Muangthong United (T2)	2025	2027
16	Dylan Fox	(Northern Ireland) (Australia)	15 April 1994 (age 32)	(Finland) FC Lahti (F1)	2025	2027
17	Amirul Haikal	(Singapore)	11 October 1999 (age 27)	(Singapore) Young Lions	2021	2027
23	Irfan Najeeb	(Singapore)	31 July 1999 (age 27)	(Singapore) Young Lions	2021	2027
26	Takeshi Yoshimoto	(Japan)	23 October 2001 (age 25)	(Japan) FC Ryukyu (J3)	2025	2027
32	Erfan Nurhan Fazly	(Singapore)	19 August 2009 (age 17)	(Singapore) Tanjong Pagar United	2026	2027
56	Zeeshan Iskandar	(Singapore)	3 April 2007 (age 19)	(Singapore) Tampines Rovers U21	2022	2027
64	Ariq Rizzuwan	(Singapore)	16 March 2009 (age 17)	(Singapore) Tampines Rovers U17	2025	2027
71	Irfan Fandi	(Singapore)	13 August 1997 (age 29)	(Thailand) Port (T1)	2026	2026
73	Adly Nufail	(Singapore)	18	(Singapore) Tampines Rovers U21	2025	2026
76	Mika Bazil Baihakki	(Singapore)	24 April 2009 (age 17)	(Singapore) Tampines Rovers U17	2024	2027
77	Sky Yeo Sze Kai	(Singapore)	18	(Singapore) Tampines Rovers U21	2025	2027
	Jovan Ang	(Singapore)	23 August 2006 (age 20)	(Singapore) Young Lions	2022	2027
Midfielders
8	Shah Shahiran	(Singapore)	14 November 1999 (age 27)	(Singapore) Young Lions	2023	2027
11	Shodai Yokoyama	(Japan)	14 October 2000 (age 26)	(Singapore) Geylang International	2026	2027
15	Ong Yu En	(Singapore)	3 October 2003 (age 23)	(Singapore) Young Lions	2022	2027
21	Iman Hakim	(Singapore)	9 March 2002 (age 24)	(Singapore) Tampines Rovers U21	2021	2027
27	Anton Yen Goh	(Singapore)	26 May 2005 (age 21)	(Singapore) Tampines Rovers U17	2022	2027
33	Seiga Sumi	(Japan)	11 June 2002 (age 24)	(Japan) Fagiano Okayama (J1)	2025	2027
49	Yuki Kobayashi	(Japan)	24 April 1992 (age 34)	(Japan) Iwate Grulla Morioka (J4)	2026	2027
72	Josiah Lim Zhi Yu	(Singapore)		(Spain) Alcobendas	2025	2027
78	Qylfie Ryan Bin Fazlie	(Singapore)	18	(Singapore) Tampines Rovers U21	2025	2026
81	Yuma Kimura	(Japan)	5 February 2007 (age 19)	(Japan) Renofa Yamaguchi (J3)	2026	2027
88	Koya Kazama	(Japan)	16 April 1993 (age 33)	(Japan) JEF United Chiba (J2)	2025	2027
	Caelan Cheong Tze Jay	(Singapore)	22 January 2006 (age 20)	(Singapore) Young Lions	2022	2027
Forwards
9	Nabel Yoshitaka Furusawa	(Japan) (Ghana)	28 March 2003 (age 23)	(Japan) Kashiwa Reysol (J1)	2026	2027
10	Faris Ramli (VC)	(Singapore)	24 August 1992 (age 34)	(Singapore) Lion City Sailors	2023	2027
14	Aaryan Ishmael	(Singapore)		(Singapore) Tampines Rovers U17	2026	2027
18	Kenshin Yamazaki	(Japan)	25 June 2007 (age 19)	(Japan) Fujieda MYFC (J2)	2026	2027
25	Hide Higashikawa	(Japan)	13 July 2002 (age 24)	(Japan) Tochigi City (J3)	2025	2028
29	Rasul Ramli	(Singapore)	26 March 2007 (age 19)	(Singapore) Young Lions	2025	2027
31	Dahri Daud	(Singapore)		(Singapore) Woodlands Lions	2026	2027
34	Ryyan Aaron Khan	(Singapore)		(Singapore)	2026	2027
37	Naufal Mohammad	(Singapore)	20 September 2006 (age 20)	(Singapore) Tampines Rovers U21	2023	2027
40	Syazwan Latiff	(Singapore)	21 February 2006 (age 20)	(Singapore) Young Lions	2026	2027
47	Matthias Josaphat Koesno	(Singapore) (Indonesia)	13 July 2006 (age 20)	(Singapore) Young Lions	2022	2027
94	Aqil Rifaldy	(Singapore)		(Singapore) Geylang International U21	2026	2027
	Nicolas Michael Beninger	(Singapore) (France)	4 July 2006 (age 20)	(Singapore) Young Lions	2022	2027
Players loaned out during season
12	Joel Chew	(Singapore)	9 February 2000 (age 26)	(Singapore) Young Lions	2022	2027
Players on National Service
80	Kieran Tan Yi An	(Singapore)	1 January 2008 (age 18)	(Singapore) Tampines Rovers U21	2024	2026
19	Caden Lim Zheng Yi	(Singapore)	10 February 2006 (age 20)	(Singapore) Tampines Rovers U21	2025	2027
55	Kegan Phang	(Singapore)	23 January 2006 (age 20)	(Singapore) Tampines Rovers U21	2023	2027
Players who left during season
7	Seia Kunori	(Japan)	31 March 2001 (age 25)	(Thailand) Bangkok United	2026	2027

Remarks:
^{FP U21} These players are registered as U21 foreign players.

=== Women ===
As of 25 July 2025

No.	Name	Nationality	Date of Birth (Age)	Last club	Contract Since	Contract End
Goalkeepers
1	Nurul Atiqah Salihin	(Singapore)	26 September 2006 (age 20)	JSSL Singapore	2022	2026
18	Nurul Haziqah	(Singapore)	23	(Singapore) Lion City Sailors	2026	2026
19	Beatrix Ong-Pratt	(United Kingdom)	15	JSSL Singapore	2026	2026
23	Izzati Safwanah	(Singapore)	30	Singapore Khalsa	2025	2026
Defenders
2	Nursabrina Iskandar	(Singapore)	23	(Singapore) Geylang International FC	2025	2026
3	Jia Samra	(United States)	15	JSSL Singapore	2026	2026
5	Kinley Melski (VC)	(Canada)	15	JSSL Singapore	2026	2026
11	Darvina Halini (C)	(Singapore)	38	(Singapore) Police SA	2024	2026
13	Shaniz Qistina	(Singapore)	6 June 2003 (age 23)	(Singapore) Tiong Bahru FC	2025	2026
14	Sharifah Amira	(Singapore)	30	(Singapore) Police SA	2024	2026
16	Aqilah Salihin (VC)	(Singapore)	24 January 2008 (age 18)	(Singapore) JSSL Youth	2023	2026
20	Nava Mueller	(Germany)	15	(Singapore) JSSL Youth	2026	2026
21	Sophie Lee	(Singapore)	17	(Singapore) JSSL Youth	2026	2026
24	Erika Seah	(Singapore)	19	(Singapore) JSSL Youth	2026	2026
Midfielders
4	Vivian Eng Yan Ran	(Singapore)	36	(Singapore) Balestier Khalsa FC	2024	2026
6	Maya Stephen	(United Kingdom)	16	(Singapore) JSSL Youth	2026	2026
7	Shazana Ashiq	(Singapore)	8 April 2004 (age 22)	(Singapore) Balestier Khalsa FC	2024	2026
12	Fitrizah Fitri	(Singapore)	23	(Singapore) Tanjong Pagar United FC	2025	2026
15	Maya Muller	(Germany)	17	(Singapore) JSSL Youth	2026	2026
17	Siti Nor Aqilah	(Singapore)	7 October 2001 (age 25)	(Singapore) Geylang International FC	2024	2026
22	Mia Thomson	(Canada)	16	(Singapore) JSSL Youth	2026	2026
33	Lucinda Ratcliffe	(United Kingdom)	15	(Singapore) JSSL Youth	2026	2026
Forwards
8	Cristina Clavel	(United States)	16	(Singapore) JSSL Youth	2026	2026
9	Victoria Hudson	(United Kingdom)	16	(Singapore) JSSL Youth	2026	2026
10	Nahwah Aidilreza	(Singapore)	4 May 2007 (age 19)	(Singapore) Geylang International FC	2025	2026
25	Lyra Ayaana Rippon	(Singapore)	15	JSSL Singapore	2025	2026
Players who left mid-season
	Ananya Pande	(India)	15	(Singapore) JSSL Youth	2025	2025
	Erlysha Qistina	(Singapore)	26 June 2006 (age 20)	(Singapore) Tiong Bahru FC	2025	2025
	Iffah Amrin (Vice-Captain)	(Singapore)	22	(Singapore) Home United FC	2023	2025
	Anna Seng	(Singapore)	17	JSSL Singapore	2023	2025
	Mio Irisawa	(Japan)	15	JSSL Singapore		
	Fathimah Syaakirah	(Singapore)	4 September 2004 (age 21)	(Singapore) Hougang United FC	2025	2025
	Isabella Rose Edwards	(Australia)	15	(Singapore) Balestier Khalsa U13	2025	2025
	Syakirah Jumain	(Singapore)	24	(Singapore) Tiong Bahru FC	2025	2025
	Fatin Nur Syarafana Binte Alias	(Singapore)	28	(Singapore)	2025	2025
	Siti Asyura	(Singapore)	22	(Singapore)	2025	2025
	Ruby Alexandra Brooks	(Australia) (Philippines)	16	JSSL Singapore	2025	2025
	Maisarah Ramat	(Singapore)	32	(Singapore) Albirex Niigata FC (S)	2025	2025
	Zoey Chua	(Singapore)	18	(Singapore) Temasek Polytechnic	2024	2024
	Lucie Lefebvre	(France)	16	JSSL Singapore	2025	2025
	Nurmanissa Soria	(Singapore)	41	(Singapore) Police SA	2024	2025

== Coaching staff ==
Position	Name	Ref.
Chairman	(Japan) Shungo Sakamoto	
Vice-Chairman / Sporting Director	(Japan) Tadanari Lee	
General Manager	(Japan) Ryo Toyoda	
Men's Team
SPL Head Coach	(Singapore) Nazri Nasir	
Assistant Coach; SPL2 Head Coach	(Japan) Jun Marques Davidson	
Goalkeeper Coach; Team Manager	(Malaysia) Ng Wei Xian	
Fitness Coach	(Germany) Jens Eiberger	
Video Analyst	(Singapore)	
Club Doctor	(Singapore) Dr Dinesh Sirisena	
Sports Trainer	(Singapore) Danial Feriza (Singapore) Seishen Ratnagopal	
SYL U19 Head Coach	(Singapore) Robert Eziakor	
SYL U17 Head Coach	(Singapore) Azfar Zainal Abidin	
SYL U15 Head Coach	(Singapore) Rudy Benicio	
SYL U13 Head Coach	(Singapore) Faizal Zainuddin	
Physiotherapist	(Singapore) Nurul Ain Hassan (Singapore) Rahulpaskaran Shoban (Singapore) Isaac Tan (Singapore) Daniel Tan (Singapore) Calvin Chua (Singapore) Sarita Mok	
Logistics Officer	(Singapore) Goh Koon Hiang	
Women's Team
Team Manager	(Singapore) Syed Amirul Haziq	
Head Coach	(Singapore) Hafeez Shahni	
Assistant Coach	(Singapore) Irwan Shah (Singapore) Rudy Ali (Singapore) Azfar Zainal Abidin	
Sports Trainer	(Singapore) Vivian Eng	
Goalkeeper Coach	(Singapore) Tham Yong Jun	
Physiotherapist	(Singapore) Tan Junn Faye (Singapore) Tessa Seow (Singapore) Sarita Mok	

== Transfers ==
=== In ===
Pre-season

Date (Note: Date of club's announcement, will be either date of club announcement or 1 Jun-2025, the date which the free agent start due to lapse of previous contract)	Position	Player	Transferred from	Ref
First team
31 May 2026	DF	(Singapore) Amirul Adli	(Malaysia) Negeri Sembilan (M1)	Loan Return
31 May 2026	DF	(Singapore) Andrew Aw	(Singapore) Young Lions	Loan Return (Note: Andrew loaned back to YL till end of SEA Games)
1 June 2026	FW	(Japan) Hide Higashikawa	(Japan) Tochigi City (J2)	Undisclosed; 2-years contract till 2028 (Note: Hide signed a 2 years contract after successful negotiation with Tochigi.)
7 June 2026	FW	(Japan) Kenshin Yamazaki	(Japan) Fujieda MYFC (J2)	Season loan
9 June 2026	MF	(Japan) Shodai Yokoyama	(Singapore) Geylang International	Free
11 June 2026	MF	(Japan) Seiga Sumi	(Japan) Fagiano Okayama	Free
16 June 2026	MF	(Japan) Yuma Kimura	(Japan) Renofa Yamaguchi (J3)	Season loan
3 July 2026	GK	(Singapore) Zharfan Rohaizad	(Singapore) Lion City Sailors	Free
4 July 2026	FW	(Japan) Seia Kunori	(Thailand) Bangkok United	Free
14 September 2026	DF	(Singapore) Irfan Fandi	(Thailand) Port	Free
18 September 2026	FW	(Japan) (Ghana) Nabel Yoshitaka Furusawa	(Japan) Kashiwa Reysol	Season loan
18 October 2026	FW	(Singapore) Syazwan Latiff	(Singapore) Geylang International	Free
1 November 2026	DF	(Singapore) Jovan Ang	(Singapore) SAFSA	End of NS
1 November 2026	MF	(Singapore) Caelan Cheong Tze Jay	(Singapore) SAFSA	End of NS
1 November 2026	FW	(Singapore) (France) Nicolas Michael Beninger	(Singapore) SAFSA	End of NS
Women

Mid-season

Date (Note: Date of club's announcement, will be either date of club announcement or 1 Jun-2025, the date which the free agent start due to lapse of previous contract)	Position	Player	Transferred from	Ref
First team

=== Out ===
Preseason

Date (Note: Date of club's announcement, will be either date of club announcement or 1 Jun-2025, the date which the free agent start due to lapse of previous contract)	Position	Player	Transferred To	Ref
First team
31 May 2026	FW	(Japan) Hide Higashikawa	(Japan) Tochigi City	End of loan (Note: Hide signed a 2 years contract after successful negotiation with Tochigi.)
6 June 2026	FW	(Japan) (Senegal) Talla Ndao	(Thailand) Muang Loei United	Free
8 June 2026	DF	(Japan) Takeshi Yoshimoto	N.A.	Free (Note: Takeshi subsequently re-signs with the team on 2 Sept 2026.)
10 June 2026	MF	(Japan) Seiga Sumi	(Japan) Fagiano Okayama	End of loan
15 June 2026	DF	(Japan) Shuya Yamashita	(Singapore) Young Lions	Free
17 June 2026	GK	(United States) (Singapore) Kasey Rogers	(Japan) Yokohama FC	Free
17 June 2026	GK	(Singapore) Danial Iliya	(Singapore)	Free
17 June 2026	FW	(Singapore) (Greece) Zikos Chua	(Singapore) Balestier Khalsa	Free
23 June 2026	FW	(Singapore) Taufik Suparno	(Singapore) Tanjong Pagar United	Free
27 June 2026	FW	(Singapore) Glenn Kweh	(Singapore) Lion City Sailors	Free; 2 years contract till Jun-28
30 June 2026	DF	(Singapore) Shaddiq Mansor	(Singapore) Balestier Khalsa	Free
30 June 2026	MF	(India) Aaditya Aprameya	(Singapore) Lion City Sailors	Free
30 June 2026	FW	(Chinese Taipei) Jasper Chen Hong-An	(Singapore) Lion City Sailors	Free
30 June 2026	FW	(Singapore) Lim Zheng Wu	(United States) Indian Hills CC	Free
4 July 2026	DF	(Singapore) Andrew Aw	(Singapore) FC Jurong	Free
5 July 2026	FW	(Malta) (Australia) Trent Buhagiar	(Thailand) Uthai Thani	Free
31 July 2026	MF	(Singapore) Rae Peh	(Singapore) Young Lions	Free
7 August 2026	FW	(Japan) Seia Kunori	(Japan) Matsumoto Yamaga	Undisclosed
30 August 2026	MF	(Singapore) Joel Chew	(Singapore) Young Lions	Loan till Dec-2026
Academy
Women

=== National Services ===
Preseason

Date (Note: Date of club's announcement, else will be 1 Jun-2025, the date which the free agent start due to lapse of previous contract)	Position	Player	Transferred To	Ref
First team
U23
1 October 2024	DF	(Singapore) Jovan Ang	(Singapore) SAFSA	NS till November 2026
1 October 2024	MF	(Singapore) Caelan Cheong Tze Jay	(Singapore) SAFSA	NS till November 2026
1 October 2024	FW	(Singapore) (France) Nicolas Michael Beninger	(Singapore) SAFSA	NS till November 2026
4 September 2026	DF	(Singapore) Caden Lim Zheng Yi	(Singapore) SAFSA	NS till August 2028
17 October 2026	DF	(Singapore) Kegan Phang	(Singapore) SAFSA	NS till September 2028

=== Extension and retained ===
First Team

Position	Player	Ref
DF	(Australia) Dylan Fox	2-years contract signed June 2025 till June 2027
MF	(Japan) Yuki Kobayashi	1.5 years contract signed Jan 2026 till June 2027
MF	(Japan) Koya Kazama	2-years contract signed June 2025 till June 2027
GK	(Singapore) Syazwan Buhari	
DF	(Singapore) (Denmark) Jacob Mahler	
DF	(Singapore) Amirul Haikal	
DF	(Singapore) Irfan Najeeb	

== Friendlies ==
=== Pre-season ===
Win Draw Loss

President Cup

Pos	Team	Pld	W	D	L	GF	GA	GD	Pts	Qualification
1	(Indonesia) Persib Bandung (H, A)	3	3	0	0	3	0	+3	9	Advance to the Semi-Final
2	(Indonesia) Arema (A)	3	2	0	1	4	2	+2	6	Advance to the Semi-Final
3	(Singapore) Tampines Rovers (E)	3	0	1	2	3	5	−2	1	
4	(Brunei) DPMM FC (E)	3	0	1	2	2	5	−3	1	

First match(es) will be played: 25 July 2026. Source: 2026 Piala Presiden
Rules for classification: Tiebreakers
(A) Advance to a further round; (E) Eliminated; (H) Hosts

25 July 2026 1	DPMM (Brunei)	2–2	(Singapore) Tampines Rovers	Bandung, Indonesia
	Azwan Ali Rahman 47'; Óscar Santis 59'		Hide Higashikawa 3'; Faris Ramli 71'	Stadium: Si Jalak Harupat Stadium

28 July 2026 2	Arema (Indonesia)	2–1	(Singapore) Tampines Rovers	Bandung, Indonesia
	Gustavo Henrique 27', 33'		Dylan Fox 45+3'	Stadium: Si Jalak Harupat Stadium

31 July 2026 3	Persib (Indonesia)	1–0	(Singapore) Tampines Rovers	Bandung, Indonesia
	Balša Sekulić 81'			Stadium: Si Jalak Harupat Stadium

Others

22 August 2026 4	Tampines Rovers (Singapore)	3–1	(Singapore) Hougang United	Bishan
				Stadium: Bishan Stadium

== Team statistics ==
=== Appearances and goals ===
As of 22 Nov 26

No.	Pos.	Player	SPL		Singapore Cup		Community Shield		AFC Champions League Two		AFF Shopee Cup		Total	
No.	Pos.	Player	Apps.	Goals	Apps.	Goals	Apps.	Goals	Apps.	Goals	Apps.	Goals	Apps.	Goals
2	DF	(Singapore) Raoul Suhaimi	4+1	0	0	0	0+1	0	1+1	1	0+1	0	9	1
5	DF	(Singapore) Amirul Adli	0+1	0	0	0	0+1	0	0	0	1	0	3	0
6	MF	(Singapore) (Denmark) Jacob Mahler	5+1	0	0	0	1	0	3	0	0+2	1	12	1
8	MF	(Singapore) Shah Shahiran	6	0	0	0	1	0	3	0	0	0	10	0
9	FW	(Japan) (Ghana) Nabel Yoshitaka Furusawa	2+2	0	0	0	0	0	1+1	0	2	1	8	1
10	FW	(Singapore) Faris Ramli	3+3	2	0	0	1	0	1+3	1	0+1	0	12	3
11	MF	(Japan) Shodai Yokoyama	4+2	1	0	0	1	0	2+1	0	1+1	0	12	1
15	MF	(Singapore) Ong Yu En	0+1	0	0	0	0	0	0	0	1	0	2	0
16	DF	(Australia) (Northern Ireland) Dylan Fox	3+1	0	0	0	1	0	2	0	2	0	9	0
17	DF	(Singapore) Amirul Haikal	2	0	0	0	0	0	0+1	0	1	0	4	0
18	FW	(Japan) Kenshin Yamazaki	3+3	1	0	0	0+1	0	1+3	0	1	0	12	1
21	MF	(Singapore) Iman Hakim	0+2	0	0	0	0	0	0	0	0	0	2	0
23	DF	(Singapore) Irfan Najeeb	1+1	0	0	0	1	0	0+2	0	1	0	6	0
24	GK	(Singapore) Syazwan Buhari	4	0	0	0	0	0	2	0	0	0	6	0
25	FW	(Japan) Hide Higashikawa	6	9	0	0	1	0	3	0	2	1	12	10
26	DF	(Japan) Takeshi Yoshimoto	2+3	0	0	0	0	0	1+1	0	1+1	0	9	0
27	MF	(Singapore) Anton Yen Goh	0	0	0	0	0	0	0	0	0	0	0	0
28	GK	(Singapore) Zharfan Rohaizad	2	0	0	0	1	0	1	0	2	0	6	0
33	MF	(Japan) Seiga Sumi	6	1	0	0	1	0	3	0	1+1	1	12	2
40	FW	(Singapore) Syazwan Latiff	0	0	0	0	0	0	0	0	0	0	0	0
47	MF	(Singapore) (Indonesia) Matthias Josaphat Koesno	0	0	0	0	0	0	0	0	0	0	0	0
49	MF	(Japan) Yuki Kobayashi	5	1	0	0	1	0	3	0	2	0	11	1
56	DF	(Singapore) Zeeshan Iskandar	0	0	0	0	0	0	0	0	0	0	0	0
71	DF	(Singapore) Irfan Fandi	2+2	0	0	0	0	0	2	0	2	0	8	0
81	MF	(Japan) Yuma Kimura	1+2	1	0	0	0	0	1+2	0	0+1	0	7	1
88	MF	(Japan) Koya Kazama	5	1	0	0	1	0	3	0	2	1	11	2
Players who have played this season and/or sign for the season but had left the club or on loan to other club
12	MF	(Singapore) Joel Chew	0	0	0	0	0	0	0	0	0	0	0	0
Players who have played this season and/or sign for the season but had left the club for NS
19	MF	(Singapore) Caden Lim Zheng Yi	0+1	0	0	0	0	0	0	0	0	0	1	0
55	DF	(Singapore) Kegan Phang Jun	0	0	0	0	0	0	0	0	0	0	0	0

== Competitions ==
=== Community Shield ===
6 September 2026 Community Shield	Lion City Sailors (Singapore)	2–0	(Singapore) Tampines Rovers	Jalan Besar
	Ilhan Fandi 17', 26'	Report	Jacob Mahler (yellow card) 61'; Koya Kazama (yellow card) 74'	Stadium: Jalan Besar Stadium; Attendance: 3,865; Referee: Khairul Amri; Man of the Match: (Singapore) Ilhan Fandi

=== Singapore Premier League ===
Win Draw Loss

11 September 2026 1	Tampines Rovers (Singapore)	2–0	(Singapore) Balestier Khalsa	Tampines
	Tajeli Salamat 29' (o.g.); Hide Higashikawa 86'; Shah Shahiran (yellow card) 67'	Report	Daniel Goh (yellow card) 41'; Fudhil I’yadh (yellow card) 69'	Stadium: Our Tampines Hub; Referee: Muhammad Taqi; Man of the Match: (Japan) Hide Higashikawa

4 February 2027 2 (Rescheduled)	Lion City Sailors (Singapore)	–	(Singapore) Tampines Rovers	Jalan Besar
				Stadium: Jalan Besar Stadium

11 October 2026 3	Tanjong Pagar United (Singapore)	0–4	(Singapore) Tampines Rovers	Jurong East
	Jared Gallagher (yellow card) 54'; Syahrul Sazali (yellow card) 59'; Riku Fukashiro (yellow card) 73'	Report	Hide Higashikawa 63'; Yuma Kimura 86'; Seiga Sumi 89' (yellow card) 81'; Faris Ramli 90+3'; Jacob Mahler (yellow card) 49'	Stadium: Jurong East Stadium; Referee: Oswind Suriya; Man of the Match: (Japan) Hide Higashikawa

18 October 2026 4	Tampines Rovers (Singapore)	4–1	(Singapore) Young Lions	Tampines
	Faris Ramli 62'; Hide Higashikawa 71', 90+6'; Kenshin Yamazaki 82'	Report	Daisuke Sakai 44' (pen.); Hafiz Nor (yellow card) 5'; Ikram Mikhail Mustaqim (yellow card) 66'	Stadium: Our Tampines Hub; Referee: Jansen Foo; Man of the Match: (Japan) Koya Kazama

25 October 2026 5	FC Jurong (Singapore)	2–3	(Singapore) Tampines Rovers	Jurong East
	Seiya Satsukida 47'; Tyler Ho 90+2'; Mizuki Ando (yellow card) 38'; Shunsuke Ono (yellow card) 67'; Hazeem Bakre (yellow card) 83'	Report	Yuki Kobayashi 24'; Hide Higashikawa 42'; Koya Kazama 45+1'; Irfan Fandi (yellow card) 38'	Stadium: Jurong East Stadium; Referee: Hilmi Fuad; Man of the Match: (Japan) Hide Higashikawa

1 November 2026 6	Tampines Rovers (Singapore)	0–0	(Singapore) Geylang International	Tampines
		Report	Nazrul Nazari (yellow card) 37'	Stadium: Our Tampines Hub; Referee: Muhammad Taqi; Man of the Match: (Serbia) Miloš Čupić

22 November 2026 7	Hougang United (Singapore)	0–5	(Singapore) Tampines Rovers	Bishan
	Washington Jaramillo (yellow card) 64'		Hide Higashikawa 6', 65' (pen.), 79', 82'; Shodai Yokoyama 54'; Shah Shahiran (yellow card) 29'	Stadium: Bishan Stadium; Referee: Mazlan Pagira; Man of the Match: (Japan) Hide Higashikawa

29 November 2026 8	Tampines Rovers (Singapore)	–	(Singapore) FC Jurong	Tampines
				Stadium: Our Tampines Hub

14 February 2027 9	Tampines Rovers (Singapore)	–	(Singapore) Young Lions	Tampines
				Stadium: Our Tampines Hub

21 February 2027 10	Geylang International (Singapore)	–	(Singapore) Tampines Rovers	Tampines
				Stadium: Our Tampines Hub

28 February 2027 11	Tampines Rovers (Singapore)	–	(Singapore) Tanjong Pagar United	Tampines
				Stadium: Our Tampines Hub

7 March 2027 12	Lion City Sailors (Singapore)	–	(Singapore) Tampines Rovers	Jalan Besar
				Stadium: Jalan Besar Stadium

14 March 2027 13	Balestier Khalsa (Singapore)	–	(Singapore) Tampines Rovers	Bishan
				Stadium: Bishan Stadium

24 January 2027 14 (Rescheduled)	Tampines Rovers (Singapore)	–	(Singapore) Hougang United	Tampines
				Stadium: Our Tampines Hub

4 April 2027 15	Tampines Rovers (Singapore)	–	(Singapore) Tanjong Pagar United	Tampines
				Stadium: Our Tampines Hub

31 January 2027 16 (Rescheduled)	Young Lions (Singapore)	–	(Singapore) Tampines Rovers	Jalan Besar
				Stadium: Jalan Besar Stadium

18 April 2027 17	Tampines Rovers (Singapore)	–	(Singapore) FC Jurong	Tampines
				Stadium: Our Tampines Hub

24 April 2027 18	Tampines Rovers (Singapore)	–	(Singapore) Lion City Sailors	Tampines
				Stadium: Our Tampines Hub

30 April 2027 19	Geylang International (Singapore)	–	(Singapore) Tampines Rovers	Tampines
				Stadium: Our Tampines Hub

8 May 2027 20	Hougang United (Singapore)	–	(Singapore) Tampines Rovers	Bishan
				Stadium: Bishan Stadium

15 May 2027 21	Tampines Rovers (Singapore)	–	(Singapore) Balestier Khalsa	Tampines
				Stadium: Our Tampines Hub

Pos	Teams	Pld	W	D	L	GF	GA	GD	Pts
1	Lion City Sailors	6	5	1	0	25	3	+22	16
2	Tampines Rovers	6	5	1	0	18	3	+15	16
3	Geylang International	7	4	2	1	12	7	+5	14
4	FC Jurong	7	3	1	3	14	11	+3	10
5	Tanjong Pagar United	7	3	1	3	11	18	−7	10
6	Balestier Khalsa	7	2	1	4	9	15	−6	7
7	Young Lions (Note: Young Lions are not eligible to represent Singapore in AFC club competitions.)	7	1	0	6	8	25	−17	3
8	Hougang United	7	0	1	6	4	19	−15	1

Updated to match(es) played on 22 November 2026. Source: Singapore Premier League
Rules for classification: 1) Points; 2) goal difference; 3) goals scored; 4) wins

=== AFC Champions League Two ===
==== Group stage ====
Pos	Team	Pld	W	D	L	GF	GA	GD	Pts	Qualification	MCZ	PKR	SHS	TAM
1	(Japan) Machida Zelvia (A)	4	4	0	0	6	1	+5	12	Advance to round of 16	—	2–0	2–1	–
2	(Cambodia) PKR Svay Rieng	4	2	1	1	7	3	+4	7	Advance to round of 16	–	—	0–0	2–0
3	(China) Shanghai Shenhua	4	1	1	2	3	4	−1	4		0–1	–	—	2–1
4	(Singapore) Tampines Rovers (E)	4	0	0	4	2	10	−8	0		0–1	1–5	–	—

Updated to match(es) played on 5 November 2026. Source: ACL2
Rules for classification: Tiebreakers
(A) Advance to a further round; (E) Eliminated

17 September 2026 1	Shanghai Shenhua (China)	2–1	(Singapore) Tampines Rovers	Shanghai, China
	Xu Haoyang 20'; Yang Shuai 62'	Report	Faris Ramli 33'; Jacob Mahler (yellow card) 57'; Seiga Sumi (yellow card) 68'; Shah Shahiran (yellow card) 83'	Stadium: Shanghai Stadium; Attendance: 24,024; Referee: Mooud Bonyadifard (Iran)

15 October 2026 2	Tampines Rovers (Singapore)	0–1	(Japan) Machida Zelvia	Jalan Besar, Singapore
	Koya Kazama (yellow card) 39'	Report	Irfan Fandi 90+4' (o.g.); Hokuto Shimoda (yellow card) 84'	Stadium: Jalan Besar Stadium; Attendance: 947; Referee: Hussain Al-Showaikh (Bahrain)

29 October 2026 3	Tampines Rovers (Singapore)	1–5	(Cambodia) PKR Svay Rieng	Jalan Besar, Singapore
	Raoul Suhaimi 90'; Yuki Kobayashi (yellow card) 6'	Report	Martins Junior 9'; Tiago Alves 15', 24'; Kwame Peprah 42'; Nnamdi Ofufu Ibeh 69'; Takashi Odawara (yellow card) 29'	Stadium: Jalan Besar Stadium; Attendance: 573; Referee: Yahya Al-Mulla (United Arab Emirates)

5 November 2026 4	PKR Svay Rieng (Cambodia)	2–0	(Singapore) Tampines Rovers	Phnom Penh, Cambodia
	Tiago Alves 32'; Johannes Tartarotti 78'	Report		Stadium: Morodok Techo National Stadium; Attendance: 4,669; Referee: Mohammed Al-Huwaish (Saudi Arabia)

26 November 2026 5	Tampines Rovers (Singapore)	–	(China) Shanghai Shenhua	Jalan Besar, Singapore
		Report		Stadium: Jalan Besar Stadium

3 December 2026 6	Machida Zelvia (Japan)	–	(Singapore) Tampines Rovers	Machida, Japan
		Report		Stadium: Machida Stadium

=== ASEAN Club Championship ===
==== Group stage ====
Pos	Team	Pld	W	D	L	GF	GA	GD	Pts	Qualification	TAM	CHC	BOR	KUC	RBM	BRU	MDF
1	(Singapore) Tampines Rovers	2	1	1	0	5	4	+1	4	Advance to knockout stage	—	9 Dec	—	—	3–2	—	24 Feb
2	(Vietnam) Công An Hồ Chí Minh City	2	1	1	0	2	1	+1	4	Advance to knockout stage	—	—	24 Feb	16 Dec	—	1–0	—
3	(Indonesia) Borneo	2	1	1	0	1	0	+1	4	Advance to knockout stage	3 Mar	—	—	—	16 Dec	—	1–0
4	(Malaysia) Kuching City	1	0	1	0	2	2	0	1	Advance to knockout stage	2–2	—	9 Dec	—	—	24 Feb	—
5	(Thailand) Ratchaburi	2	0	1	1	3	4	−1	1		—	1–1	—	31 Mar	—	—	9 Dec
6	(Thailand) Buriram United	2	0	1	1	0	1	−1	1		31 Mar	—	0–0	—	3 Mar	—	—
7	(Philippines) Manila Digger	1	0	0	1	0	1	−1	0		—	31 Mar	—	3 Mar	—	16 Dec	—

Updated to match(es) played on 18 November 2026. Source: ASEAN United
Rules for classification: Tiebreakers

7 October 2026 1	Kuching City (Malaysia)	2–2	(Singapore) Tampines Rovers	Kuching, Malaysia
	Gabriel Peres 87', 90+3'	Report	Nabel Yoshitaka Furusawa 13'; Koya Kazama 88'; Nazri Nasir (yellow card) 72'	Stadium: Sarawak Stadium; Attendance: 5,536; Referee: Omar Al-Yaqoubi (Oman); Man of the Match: (Brazil) Gabriel Peres

18 November 2026 2	Tampines Rovers (Singapore)	3–2	(Thailand) Ratchaburi	Jalan Besar, Singapore
	Seiga Sumi 45+1'; Hide Higashikawa 69'; Jacob Mahler 90+3'	Report	Pablo Insua 34'; Robert Zulj 67' (pen.); Sanchai Nonthasila (yellow card) 49'; Sorawit Panthong (yellow card) 76'	Stadium: Jalan Besar Stadium; Referee: Wong Wai Lun (Hong Kong)

9 December 2026 3	Tampines Rovers (Singapore)	–	(Vietnam) Cong An Ho Chi Minh City	Jalan Besar, Singapore
		Report		Stadium: Jalan Besar Stadium

24 February 2027 4	Tampines Rovers (Singapore)	–	(Philippines) Manila Digger	Jalan Besar, Singapore
		Report		Stadium: Jalan Besar Stadium

4 March 2027 5	Borneo (Indonesia)	–	(Singapore) Tampines Rovers	East Kalimantan, Indonesia
		Report		Stadium: Segiri Stadium

31 March 2027 6	Buriram United (Thailand)	–	(Singapore) Tampines Rovers	Buriram, Thailand
		Report		Stadium: Chang Arena

== Competition (SPL2) ==
Win Draw Loss

24 August 2026 1	Tampines Rovers (Singapore)	4–0	(Singapore) Hougang United	Tampines
	Yuma Kimura 16'; Kenshin Yamazaki 21'; Naufal Mohammad 64', 90'; Caden Lim (yellow card) 66'	Report	Lin Ze Hao (yellow card) 67'	Stadium: Our Tampines Hub

30 August 2026 2	Tampines Rovers (Singapore)	3–0	(Singapore) Lion City Sailors	Tampines
	Matthias Koesno 26' (yellow card) 82'; Naufal Mohammad 42'; Kenshin Yamazaki 60'; Yuma Kimura (yellow card) 45'		Tyler Tan (yellow card) 72'; Aaryan Hermi (yellow card) 85'	Stadium: Our Tampines Hub

3 September 2026 3	FC Jurong (Singapore)	1–5	(Singapore) Tampines Rovers	Jurong East
	Syed Firdaus Hassan 29'; Andrew Aw (yellow card) 50'		Yuma Kimura 11'; Naufal Mohammad 70', 73'; Kenshin Yamazaki 87', 90'; Adly Nufail (yellow card) 48'	Stadium: Jurong East Stadium

19 October 2026 4	Tampines Rovers (Singapore)	5–2	(Singapore) Tanjong Pagar United	Jurong East
	Yuma Kimura (??); Kenshin Yamazaki (??); Naberu (??); (??)			Stadium: Jurong East Stadium

6 November 2026 5	Balestier Khalsa (Singapore)	2–1	(Singapore) Tampines Rovers	Bedok
	Ikmal Hazlan 28'; Zikos Chua 87'			Stadium: Bedok Stadium

30 November 2026 6	Young Lions (Singapore)	–	(Singapore) Tampines Rovers	Tampines
				Stadium: Our Tampines Hub

6 December 2026 7	Geylang International (Singapore)	–	(Singapore) Tampines Rovers	Bedok
				Stadium: Bedok Stadium

13 December 2026 8	Tampines Rovers (Singapore)	–	(Singapore) Hougang United	Tampines
				Stadium: Our Tampines Hub

16 December 2026 9	Lion City Sailors (Singapore)	–	(Singapore) Tampines Rovers	Bedok
				Stadium: Bedok Stadium

20 December 2026 10	Tampines Rovers (Singapore)	–	(Singapore) FC Jurong	Tampines
				Stadium: Our Tampines Hub

5 January 2027 11	Young Lions (Singapore)	–	(Singapore) Tampines Rovers	Tampines
				Stadium: Our Tampines Hub

8 January 2027 12	Tanjong Pagar United (Singapore)	–	(Singapore) Tampines Rovers	Tampines
				Stadium: Our Tampines Hub

12 January 2027 13	Tampines Rovers (Singapore)	–	(Singapore) Balestier Khalsa	Tampines
				Stadium: Our Tampines Hub

16 January 2027 14	Tampines Rovers (Singapore)	–	(Singapore) Geylang International	Tampines
				Stadium: Our Tampines Hub

20 January 2027 15	Hougang United (Singapore)	–	(Singapore) Tampines Rovers	Bishan
				Stadium: Bishan Stadium

24 January 2027 16	Lion City Sailors (Singapore)	–	(Singapore) Tampines Rovers	Tampines
				Stadium: Our Tampines Hub

30 January 2027 17	Tampines Rovers (Singapore)	–	(Singapore) FC Jurong	Tampines
				Stadium: Our Tampines Hub

3 February 2027 18	Tampines Rovers (Singapore)	–	(Singapore) Young Lions	Tampines
				Stadium: Our Tampines Hub

22 February 2027 19	Tanjong Pagar United (Singapore)	–	(Singapore) Tampines Rovers	Bukit Gombak
				Stadium: Bukit Gombak Stadium

1 March 2027 20	Balestier Khalsa (Singapore)	–	(Singapore) Tampines Rovers	Tampines
				Stadium: Our Tampines Hub

5 April 2027 21	Tampines Rovers (Singapore)	–	(Singapore) Geylang International	Tampines
				Stadium: Our Tampines Hub

Pos	Team	Pld	W	D	L	GF	GA	GD	Pts	Qualification or relegation
1	Geylang International II	6	5	0	1	19	2	+17	15	Champion
2	Balestier Khalsa II	6	4	1	1	10	7	+3	13	
3	Tampines Rovers II	5	4	0	1	18	5	+13	12	
4	Young Lions B	3	2	0	1	10	7	+3	6	
5	FC Jurong II	5	1	1	3	11	12	−1	4	
6	Hougang United II	5	1	1	3	5	13	−8	4	
7	Tanjong Pagar United II	6	1	1	4	8	24	−16	4	
8	Lion City Sailors II	6	1	0	5	7	18	−11	3	

First match(es) will be played: 6 November 2026. Source: Singapore Premier League 2
Rules for classification: 1) points; 2) goal difference; 3) number of goals scored; 4) number of wins

== Competition (Women's Premier League) ==
=== 2026 Women's Premier League ===
Win Draw Loss

24 Jan 2026 1	Tanjong Pagar United (Singapore)	0–2	(Singapore) BG Tampines Rovers	Singapore
		Report	Victoria Hudson 65', 87'	Stadium: Choa Chu Kang Stadium

6 February 2026 2	BG Tampines Rovers (Singapore)	1–4	(Singapore) Geylang International FC	Singapore
				Stadium: Choa Chu Kang Stadium

13 February 2026 3	Lion City Sailors FC (Singapore)	12–0	(Singapore) BG Tampines Rovers FC	Singapore
				Stadium: Yishun Stadium

21 February 2026 4	BG Tampines Rovers FC (Singapore)	0–5	(Singapore) Albirex Jurong FC	Singapore
				Stadium: Choa Chu Kang Stadium

11 March 2026 5	Tiong Bahru WFC (Singapore)	2–3	(Singapore) BG Tampines Rovers FC	Choa Chu Kang
			Nahwah Aidilreza (PEN); Victoria Hudson; Darvina Halini	Stadium: Choa Chu Kang Stadium

14 March 2026 6	BG Tampines Rovers FC (Singapore)	6–0	(Singapore) Hougang United FC	Choa Chu Kang
	Nahwah Aidilreza; Victoria Hudson; Shazana Ashiq; Sharifah Amira; Nursabrina Iskandar			Stadium: Choa Chu Kang Stadium

28 March 2026 7	Balestier Khalsa FC (Singapore)	1-6	(Singapore) BG Tampines Rovers	Singapore
			Victoria Hudson Kinley Melski Mia Thomson	Stadium: Choa Chu Kang Stadium

4 April 2026 8	BG Tampines Rovers (Singapore)	1-6	(Singapore) Still Aerion WFC	Choa Chu Kang
	Nahwah Aidilreza			Stadium: Choa Chu Kang Stadium

11 April 2026 9	BG Tampines Rovers FC (Singapore)	v	(Singapore) Tanjong Pagar United FC	Singapore
				Stadium: TBC

1 May 2026 10	Geylang International FC (Singapore)	v	(Singapore) BG Tampines Rovers FC	Singapore
				Stadium: Choa Chu Kang Stadium

9 May 2026 11	BG Tampines Rovers (Singapore)	v	(Singapore) Lion CIty Sailors FC	Singapore
				Stadium: Choa Chu Kang Stadium

16 May 2026 12	Albirex Jurong FC (Singapore)	v	(Singapore) BG Tampines Rovers FC	Singapore
				Stadium: Choa Chu Kang Stadium

6 September 2025 13	BG Tampines Rovers FC (Singapore)	v	(Singapore) Tiong Bahru FC	Singapore
				Stadium: Bukit Gombak Stadium

13 June 2026 14	Hougang United FC (Singapore)	v	(Singapore) BG Tampines Rovers	Singapore
				Stadium: Bukit Gombak Stadium

19 June 2026 15	BG Tampines Rovers (Singapore)	v	(Singapore) Balestier Khalsa FC	Singapore
				Stadium: Choa Chu Kang Stadium

TBC 16	Still Aerion WFC (Singapore)	v	(Singapore) BG Tampines Rovers FC	TBC
				Stadium: TBC

League table

Pos	Team	Pld	W	D	L	GF	GA	GD	Pts	Qualification or relegation
1	Lion City Sailors (C)	16	15	0	1	166	4	+162	45	Qualification for AFC Champions League
2	Albirex Jurong	16	15	0	1	140	6	+134	45	
3	Still Aerion	16	11	1	4	52	27	+25	34	
4	Geylang International	16	10	1	5	44	28	+16	31	
5	BG Tampines Rovers	16	7	1	8	30	58	−28	22	
6	Tanjong Pagar United	16	3	3	10	8	75	−67	12	
7	Balestier Khalsa	16	4	0	12	19	107	−88	12	
8	Tiong Bahru (R)	16	1	2	13	16	64	−48	5	Play-off with WNL runners-up
9	Hougang United (R)	16	1	2	13	9	115	−106	5	Relegation to National League

Source: Women's Premier League
Rules for classification: 1) points; 2) goal difference; 3) number of goals scored; 4) number of wins
(C) League champions; (R) Relegated
