= Zehrudin Mehmedović =

Serbian footballer

Personal information
- Date of birth: 15 March 1998 (age 28)
- Place of birth: Novi Pazar, FR Yugoslavia
- Height: 1.67 m (5 ft 6 in)
- Position: Midfielder

Youth career
- Novi Pazar
- Čukarički

Senior career*
Years	Team	Apps	(Gls)
2014–2017	Čukarički	5	(1)
2017	Mladost Lučani	0	(0)
2018	BASK		
2018	Radnički Beograd		
2019–2022	Tampines Rovers	81	(22)
2023	Gostivari	1	(0)
2024	Sloboda Užice	0	(0)
2024	→ FAP (loan)	0	(0)

International career^{‡}
2013–2014	Serbia U16	2	(1)
2014–2015	Serbia U17	5	(2)
- * Club domestic league appearances and goals as of 4 Feb 2024 ‡ National team caps and goals as of 17 October 2015

Zehrudin Mehmedović (born 15 March 1998), also known as Zeko, is a Serbian professional footballer who most recently played as a forward or attacking midfielder for Serbian League West club, FK FAP, on loan from FK Sloboda Užice. He was a member of the Serbia national under-17 team.

== Club career ==
=== Čukarički ===
Mehmedović made his Jelen SuperLiga debut for Čukarički on away match versus Partizan on 28 May 2014. When he entered into the pitch, he became the youngest player in history of Čukarički and second youngest in football history of Serbia. Mehmedović signed his first three-year professional contract with Čukarički ending of 2015.

=== Tampines Rovers ===
In December 2018, Mehmedović was offered a trial at Singapore Premier League's side, Tampines Rovers. Mehmedović was brought in by Tampines' assistant coach Fahrudin Mustafić, who said: "He's a young player, but he's very creative. These days, there aren't many No. 10 players who can give you quality final passes and can receive the ball around the box and score.

"So he adds that extra quality and he's doing well so far. It's a huge step for him to come to a foreign country, but he has been training hard and showing signs of improvement."

In his first season at the club, he helped them to clinch the 2019 Singapore Cup and the 2020 Singapore Community Shield the following season.

=== KF Gostivari ===
On 1 July 2023, Mehmedović signed for Macedonian side KF Gostivari.

== Career statistics ==
=== Club ===
As of 5 Dec 2022

Appearances and goals by club, season and competition
Club	Season	League			National cup		League cup		Continental		Total	
Club	Season	Division	Apps	Goals	Apps	Goals	Apps	Goals	Apps	Goals	Apps	Goals
Čukarički	2013–14	Serbian SuperLiga	1	0	0	0	—		—		1	0
Čukarički	2014–15	Serbian SuperLiga	0	0	0	0	—		0	0	0	0
Čukarički	2015–16	Serbian SuperLiga	1	0	0	0	—		0	0	1	0
Čukarički	2016–17	Serbian SuperLiga	3	0	0	0	—		0	0	3	0
Čukarički	Total		5	0	0	0	—		0	0	5	0
Mladost Lučani	2017–18	Serbian SuperLiga	0	0	1	0	—		0	0	1	0
Tampines Rovers	2019	Singapore Premier League	24	7	6	2	0	0	6	2	36	11
Tampines Rovers	2020	Singapore Premier League	14	2	0	0	1	0	4	0	19	2
Tampines Rovers	2021	Singapore Premier League	19	6	0	0	0	0	6	0	25	6
Tampines Rovers	2022	Singapore Premier League	24	7	5	2	0	0	2	1	31	10
Tampines Rovers	Total		81	22	11	4	1	0	18	3	111	29
KF Gostivari	2023–24	Macedonian First Football League	1	0	0	0	—		—		1	0
Sloboda Užice	2023–24	Serbian First League	0	0	0	0	—		—		0	0
FK FAP (loan)	2023–24	Serbian League West	0	0	0	0	—		—		0	0
Career total			87	22	12	4	1	0	18	3	118	29

== Honours ==
Tampines Rovers

- Singapore Cup: 2019
- Singapore Community Shield: 2020
