= Fahrudin Mustafić =

Serbian-born Singaporean footballer (born 1981)

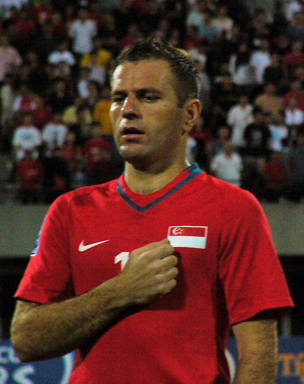

Personal information
- Date of birth: 17 April 1981 (age 45)
- Place of birth: Novi Pazar, SFR Yugoslavia
- Height: 1.80 m (5 ft 11 in)
- Positions: Centre-back; defensive midfielder

Team information
- Current team: Singapore (assistant coach)

Youth career
- 1991–2000: Novi Pazar

Senior career*
Years	Team	Apps	(Gls)
2000–2001	Novi Pazar		
2002–2009	Tampines Rovers	146	(28)
2003	→ Sengkang Marine (loan)	31	(2)
2009–2010	Persija Jakarta	25	(0)
2010–2011	Persela Lamongan	24	(3)
2011–2018	Tampines Rovers	155	(15)

International career
2006–2018	Singapore	87	(8)

Managerial career
- 2019–2025: Tampines Rovers (assistant)
- 2025–: Singapore (assistant)
- * Club domestic league appearances and goals

Fahrudin Mustafić (born 17 April 1981) is a Serbian-born retired footballer who spent most of his playing career as a centre-back for Singapore Premier League club Tampines Rovers and retired at the end of the 2018 season. Mustafić represented the Singapore national team. He is currently working as an assistant coach for the said national team.

== Football career ==
=== Club career ===
Born in Novi Pazar, SR Serbia, SFR Yugoslavia, Mustafić started playing in the youth team of FK Novi Pazar when he was 10. He played in the youth teams until 2000, when he joined the senior squad and spent two seasons in the Second League of FR Yugoslavia.

In January 2002, Mustafić was brought to Singapore with the help of fellow Serbian and Tampines Rovers player, Sead Muratović. Impressive displays in his first two seasons earned him citizenship.

Mustafić, or "Farra" as he is affectionately known by fans of the Tampines Rovers and the national team, was known as a tenacious player.

Mustafić became a pivotal member of the national set-up with his crisp passing and tight marking ability. He was also proficient in taking penalties and was the first-choice penalty taker for both club and country.

In September 2009, Mustafić went to Indonesia to play for Persija Jakarta. Following his release by Persija, he joined Persela Lamongan. He returned to the Tampines Rovers in June 2011.

At the end of the 2018 Singapore Premier League, Mustafić announced his retirement from professional football, having played more than 300 official games for Tampines Rovers.

=== Coaching career ===
After retirement, Mustafić stayed on with the club to be the assistant coach of the team.

=== International career ===
Mustafić made his debut for the national team in a friendly against Denmark in January 2006.

Mustafić was also part of the national side that took part at the 2007 AFF Championship, where he played a key role in helping Singapore retain their title. He scored his first goal for Singapore in the final through a controversial penalty against Thailand at the National Stadium.

== Personal life ==
Mustafić became a Singaporean citizen in 2005 under the Foreign Sports Talent Scheme. He is a Muslim.

== National team career statistics ==
=== Goals for senior national team ===
#	Date	Venue	Opponent	Score	Result	Competition
1.	31 January 2007	Singapore	Thailand	2–1	Won	2007 AFF Championship
2.	24 January 2008	Muscat, Oman	Kuwait	2–0	Won	Friendly
3.	31 January 2008	Zarqa, Jordan	Jordan	1–2	Lost	Friendly
4.	2 June 2008	Singapore	Uzbekistan	3–7	Lost	2010 FIFA World Cup qualification
5.	5 December 2008	Jakarta, Indonesia	Cambodia	5–0	Won	2008 AFF Championship
6.	14 November 2009	Singapore	Thailand	1–3	Lost	2011 AFC Asian Cup qualification
7.	23 July 2011	Singapore	Malaysia	5–3	Won	2014 FIFA World Cup qualification
8.	19 December 2012	Singapore	Thailand	3–1	Won	2012 AFF Championship

== Honours ==
Tampines Rovers

- S.League: 2004, 2005
- Singapore Cup: 2004, 2006

Singapore

- AFF Championship: 2007, 2012

Individual

- ASEAN Football Federation Best XI: 2013
