= Gavin Lee (football coach) =

Singaporean football coach (born 1990)

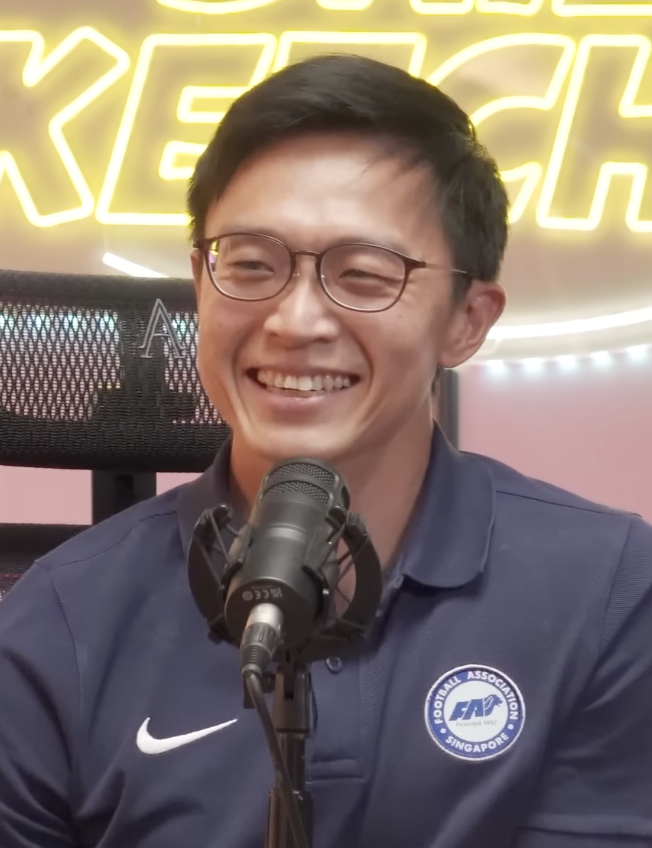
- Lee in 2026

Personal information
- Full name: Gavin Joshua Lee Tse Peng
- Date of birth: 8 September 1990 (age 36)
- Place of birth: Singapore
- Position: Central midfielder

Team information
- Current team: Singapore (head coach)

Senior career*
Years	Team	Apps	(Gls)
2012–2014	SCC	0	(0)

Managerial career
- 2014–2015: Warriors (assistant)
- 2017–2018: Tampines Rovers (assistant)
- 2019–2025: Tampines Rovers
- 2024–2025: Singapore (assistant)
- 2025: Singapore (interim)
- 2025–: Singapore
- * Club domestic league appearances and goals

Gavin Joshua Lee Tse Peng (Chinese: 李斯平; born 8 September 1990) is a Singaporean professional football coach who is currently the head coach of the Singapore national team.

== Early life ==
Gavin played for the Tampines under-8s, as well as the under-10s, teams that his father coached at the time. Gavin was enrolled in the National Football Academy and also played for the national under-14 team where he played most of his time as a midfielder.

After training alongside Gabriel Quak, Hariss Harun, Izwan Mahbud, Hafiz Abu Sujad, Izzdin Shafiq, Afiq Yunos and Fazli Ayob, Gavin knew he would not be able to keep up. He shared that “It was also at that point that I realised I couldn't cope academically, so I decided to choose a different path” and turned to coaching because his father had been a coach since he was young.

== Education ==
Gavin studied at Victoria School and Victoria Junior College where he captained the school football team for Victoria Junior College. He later studied in Nanyang Technological University and had a degree in Sports Science and Management. While pursuing a degree, Gavin went on to take up to 14 training sessions a week with JSSL Singapore needing to clocked his coaching badges.

As a young football coach, Gavin admitted that a consequence of his daily routines is that he “does not have as many friends as others”. When Gavin was in university, he was often labelled an "old man" as he did not join his peers for suppers and parties and chose to rest early to work the following day. His potential was subsequently spotted by a Malaysia Coach known as Asaph D. He was nurtured and guided closely since then.

== Club career ==
Gavin was part of the SCC squad in the Singapore National Football League from 2012 to 2014. He later transitioned into coaching, first as an assistant coach with Warriors, and subsequently as head coach of Tampines Rovers.

== Managerial career ==
Gavin's first taste of coaching came at 16 when he followed his dad to his coaching sessions and was in charge of laying out cones. Gavin joined the JSSL Singapore when he was 18 as a "cone guy" where he coach various age groups at the JSSL Singapore academy before becoming the general manager in 2016.

In June 2011, Gavin was issued an AFC 'C' Coaching License at the age of 21. He then went on to get the AFC 'B' Coaching License in July 2015 before finally getting to the highest achieving license, AFC 'A' Coaching License in January 2020.

=== Warriors ===
In 2014, Gavin joined Warriors as their match analyst in their title winning season in 2014 where he got promoted to the assistant coach under Alex Weaver in 2015. Lee left Warriors in October 2015.

=== Tampines Rovers ===
In December 2017, Lee joined Tampines Rovers as an assistant coach under head coach Jürgen Raab. In 2019, after head coach Raab was relieved of his duties at Tampines Rovers on 9 October 2018, Gavin was appointed as head coach despite lacking the required Asian Football Confederation 'A' License to become the head coach. The appointment was based on his past performance as Warriors' assistant coach and impressed Tampines Rovers' staff and players with his knowledge. He was then the youngest head coach in the history of the Singapore Premier League.

Lee led the club to second place in the Singapore Premier League (SPL) and won the 2019 Singapore Cup in his first season in charge. Tampines Rovers placed second in the SPL again in his second year at the head of the team.

During the 2021 season, Lee led the team to their first ever AFC Champions League debut in Tashkent, Uzbekistan which they are drawn in Group H with 2020 K League 1 champions and 2020 Korean FA Cup winners, Jeonbuk Hyundai Motors, 2020 J1 League runners-up, Gamba Osaka and Thailand Chiangrai United. On 16 June, Lee has extended his contract until 2024.

On 17 June 2025, Lee left Tampines Rovers after eight years in charge of the club.

=== Singapore ===
On 7 March 2024, Lee was invited to be part of the backroom staff of the Singapore national team by newly appointed Japanese head coach Tsutomu Ogura for the 2026 FIFA World Cup qualification match against China. On 11 June 2024, Lee was appointed in charge of the national team against Thailand after Ogura tested positive for COVID-19 and was isolated from the team.

On 24 June 2025, Ogura stepped down as the national team head coach, due to personal reasons. FAS decided to appoint Lee as the interim coach. Under Lee's leadership, Singapore completed their remaining 2027 AFC Asian Cup qualifiers strongly, drawing 1–1 at home against India, then winning 2–1 away in the return match. They followed this with a decisive 2–1 away victory over Hong Kong, securing qualification for the 2027 AFC Asian Cup. It was Singapore's first qualification achieved on merit through a full campaign and their first tournament appearance since 1984.

On 28 November 2025, following their success in the qualification to the 2027 AFC Asian Cup, FAS announced Lee had become the permanent head coach of the Singapore national team on an 18-month contract and had become the first local coach since 2016 to take the helms.

== Personal life ==
Gavin's younger sister Genevieve, who is a 29-year-old doctor, was formerly a youth international footballer for Singapore. Gavin's father Lawrence, a youth coach who took charge of the Victoria Junior College girls’ team from 2012 to 2025 and led them to 11 straight titles from 2013, excluding the COVID-19 pandemic years of 2020 and 2021.

== Managerial statistics ==
As of match played 17 November 2026

Managerial record by team and tenure
Team	Nat.	From	To	Record					Ref.
Team	Nat.	From	To	G	W	D	L	Win %	Ref.
Tampines Rovers	(Singapore)	1 January 2020	17 June 2025	154	78	36	40	50.65	
Singapore	(Singapore)	25 June 2025	Present	19	9	3	7	47.37	
Career Total				173	87	39	47	50.29	

== Managerial statistics for national team ==
4 Sep 2025 Friendly	Malaysia	0–3; Awarded (Note: Due to the Malaysian football naturalisation scandal, the FIFA Disciplinary Committee awarded the match as a 3–0 win to Singapore on 17 December 2025 as Malaysia fielded the ineligible players Gabriel Palmero, Facundo Garcés, Rodrigo Holgado, João Figueiredo and Jon Irazabal. The Football Association of Malaysia (FAM) were also fined CHF 10,000.)	Singapore	Kuala Lumpur, Malaysia

9 Sep 2025 Friendly	Singapore	1–1	Myanmar	Kallang, Singapore

9 Oct 2025 2027 AFC Asian Cup qualification	Singapore	1–1	India	Kallang, Singapore

14 Oct 2025 2027 AFC Asian Cup qualification	India	1–2	Singapore	Margao, India

13 Nov 2025 Friendly	Thailand	3–2	Singapore	Pathum Thani, Thailand

18 Nov 2025 2027 AFC Asian Cup qualification	Hong Kong	1–2	Singapore	Kowloon, Hong Kong

31 Mar 2026 2027 AFC Asian Cup qualification	Singapore	1–0	Bangladesh	Kallang, Singapore

31 May 2026 Friendly	Singapore	4–0	Mongolia	Kallang, Singapore

5 June 2026 Friendly	Singapore	1–2	China	Kallang, Singapore

24 July 2026 2026 ASEAN Championship	Cambodia	1–2	Singapore	Phnom Penh, Cambodia

27 July 2026 2026 ASEAN Championship	Singapore	2–0	Timor-Leste	Kallang, Singapore

31 July 2026 2026 ASEAN Championship	Vietnam	0–0	Singapore	Hanoi, Vietnam

8 August 2026 2026 ASEAN Championship	Singapore	1–1	Indonesia	Kallang, Singapore

15 August 2026 2026 ASEAN Championship	Singapore	1–3	Thailand	Kallang, Singapore

18 August 2026 2026 ASEAN Championship	Thailand	1–2	Singapore	Bangkok, Thailand

25 September 2026 2026 FIFA ASEAN Cup	Singapore	0–2	Indonesia	Jakarta, Indonesia

28 September 2026 2026 FIFA ASEAN Cup	Singapore	1–0	Bangladesh	Jakarta, Indonesia

1 October 2026 2026 FIFA ASEAN Cup	Malaysia	6–0	Singapore	Bandung, Indonesia

13 November 2026 Mizuho Blue Challenge - The Kallang Football Series Singapore	Singapore	1–4	Paraguay	Kallang, Singapore

17 November 2026 Mizuho Blue Challenge - The Kallang Football Series Singapore	Singapore	0–7	Brazil	Kallang, Singapore

== Honours ==
=== As Manager ===
Tampines Rovers

- Singapore Cup: 2019
- Singapore Community Shield: 2020
