= 2020 Singapore Community Shield =

| Tampines Rovers | Hougang United |
| 3 | 0 |
- Date: 22 February 2020
- Venue: Jalan Besar Stadium, Singapore
- Referee: (SIN)
- Attendance: 1,925

The 2020 Singapore Community Shield (also known as the AIA Community Shield for sponsorship reasons) was the 8th edition of the Singapore Charity Shield held on 22 February 2020 at Jalan Besar Stadium, between 2019 Singapore Cup winner Tampines Rovers and Hougang United. Hougang replaces 2019 Singapore Premier League champions DPMM FC who skipped the game due to precautionary travel restrictions because of the coronavirus situation.

The Rovers won the Shield for a record fifth time after defeating Hougang United 3–0.

== Match ==
=== Details ===
22 February 2020
18:00 SST

| Tampines Rovers | 3–0 | Hougang United |
|---|---|---|
| Irwan Shah 56'; Boris Kopitovic 64'; Jordan Webb 70' | Details |

Jalan Besar Stadium, Singapore
Attendance: 1,925
Referee: Ahmad A’Qashah Bin Ahmad Al Badowe (SIN)

| GK | 24 | (Singapore) Syazwan Buhari | (yellow card) 90' |
| DF | 5 | (Singapore) Amirul Adli | | (substituted off) 49' |
| DF | 17 | (Singapore) Irwan Shah |
| DF | 22 | (Singapore) Syahrul Sazali |
| MF | 7 | (Singapore) Yasir Hanapi (c) | | (substituted off) 83' |
| MF | 8 | (Japan) Kyoga Nakamura | (yellow card) 34' |
| MF | 10 | (Canada) Jordan Webb | 80' |
| MF | 12 | (Singapore) Joel Chew | | (substituted off) 68' |
| MF | 15 | (Singapore) Shah Shahiran |
| MF | 23 | (Croatia) Zehrudin Mehmedović |
| FW | 9 | (Montenegro) Boris Kopitović |
Substitutes:
| GK | 1 | (Singapore) Zulfairuuz Rudy |
| DF | 2 | (Singapore) Shannon Stephen | | (substituted on) 68' |
| DF | 6 | (Singapore) Madhu Mohana | | (substituted on) 49' |
| DF | 21 | (Singapore) Hamizan Hisham |
| MF | 11 | (Singapore) Safirul Sulaiman |
| MF | 56 | (Singapore) Danish Siregar |
| FW | 13 | (Singapore) Taufik Suparno | | (substituted on) 83' |
Head coach:
(Singapore) Gavin Lee

| GK | 18 | (Singapore) Khairulhin Khalid (c) |
| DF | 2 | (Singapore) Anders Aplin | (yellow card) 81' |
| DF | 15 | (Singapore) Jordan Vestering | (yellow card) 48' |
| DF | 17 | (Singapore) Faiz Salleh |
| DF | 19 | (Australia) Zac Anderson |
| DF | 20 | (Singapore) Muhaimin Suhaimi | | (substituted off) 42' |
| MF | 7 | (Singapore) Shahfiq Ghani |
| MF | 21 | (Singapore) Nikeshi Sidhu Singh | | (substituted off) 62' |
| MF | 24 | (Singapore) Farhan Zulkifli | | (substituted off) 74' |
| MF | 25 | (England) Charlie Machell |
| FW | 10 | (Singapore) Shawal Anuar | (yellow card) 75' |
Substitutes:
| GK | 1 | (Singapore) How Meng Heng |
| DF | 8 | (Singapore) Hafiz Abu Sujad |
| DF | 12 | (Singapore) Fabian Kwok | | (substituted on) 74' |
| DF | 14 | (Singapore) Alif Iskandar |
| MF | 4 | (Singapore) Afiq Noor | (yellow card) 86' | (substituted on) 63' |
| MF | 26 | (Singapore) Daniel Martens |
| FW | 23 | (Singapore) Sahil Suhaimi | | (substituted on) 67' |
Head coach:
(Singapore) Clement Teo

Match officials

- Referee: Ahmad A’Qashah Bin Ahmad Al Badowe (SIN)
- Assistant referees:
  - - (SIN)
  - - (SIN)
- Fourth official: - (SIN)
- Match commissioner: - (SIN)

Match rules

- 90 minutes.
- Penalty shoot-out if scores level after 90 minutes.
- Maximum of seven-named substitutes.
- Maximum of three substitutions.

== See also ==
- 2020 Singapore Premier League
