= Tampines Rovers FC =

Singaporean football club

Tampines Rovers
- Full name: Tampines Rovers Football Club
- Nickname: The Stags
- Short name: TAM
- Founded: 1951; 75 years ago
- Ground: Our Tampines Hub
- Capacity: 5,000
- Chairman: Shungo Sakamoto
- Head coach: Nazri Nasir
- League: Singapore Premier League
- 2025–26: Singapore Premier League, 2nd of 8
- Website: www.tampinesrovers.com
Home colours	Away colours

Tampines Rovers Football Club is a professional football club based in Tampines, Singapore. The club competes in the Singapore Premier League, the top tier of the Singapore football league system. Founded in 1951, the club has won 5 league titles, 4 Singapore Cups, a record 6 Community Shields and 1 ASEAN Club Championship.

The nickname The Stags originated when the club was selected for the inaugural S.League in 1996. Each club was required to choose an animal as its mascot. As such, Tampines Rovers chose the stag. While the logo itself is not modelled after any specific local species, the sambar deer is native to Singapore and remains the largest wild terrestrial mammal found in the country.

Tampines Rovers is one of the most popular football clubs in Singapore, pulling in decent crowds in their games. Their traditional rivals are Geylang International, a match known locally as the "Eastern Derby." However, since the 2020s, a new rivalry has grown with the Lion City Sailors. As the Sailors have significantly more money and a stronger squad, the two teams regularly compete against each other at the top of the league.

== History ==
Several teenaged football enthusiasts formed the club in 1951 as "Tampenis Rovers", "Tampenis" being an alternative spelling for Tampines until the 1980s. The claim to have been formed in 1945 appears to have arisen from confusion with another club, Rovers SC, that were very successful between 1948 and 1953.

In 1952, "Tampenis Rovers" were admitted into the SAFA League as a "new club". In 1955, they were in Division 2A of the SAFA league.

"Tampenis Rovers" were not registered as a society under the Societies Ordinance before 30 November 1962. The change in spelling from "Tampenis" to "Tampines" took place sometime after 1963, in which year they were in Division Three (under the old spelling).

By 1967, they were back in Division Two. In 1968, they won promotion from Division Two to Divison One, playing in Division One in 1969. In 1966, the Singapore Amateur Football Association (SAFA) had changed its name to Football Association of Singapore (FAS).

Despite finishing third in the FAS league in 1974, Tampines Rovers were placed in Division 2 of the newly formed National Football League in 1975. At the end of 1975, they were promoted to Division I after winning all their league matches and reached the President's Cup final, where they lost 0–1 to the Singapore Armed Forces Sports Association in front of a national record crowd for a domestic game of nearly 30,000. They finished third in their first season in Division One of the NFL in 1976. By the mid-1970s, Tampines Rovers was one of the best supported clubs in Singapore, with star players like Quah Kim Song.

They continued to challenge for honours over the next decade, reaching another President’s Cup final in 1978, then emerging as national champions in 1979, 1980, and 1984.

Tampines Rovers were relegated to the second tier in 1988, but won the second tier division in 1994 under a new management team. They were one of eight clubs selected in 1995 to compete in the newly formed S.League, which was due to launch in 1996.

When "Tampines Rovers Football Club" was registered in 1996 to participate as a professional club in the S. League, the amateur club, Tampines Rovers Sports Club, formed in 1951 and registered as a society sometime after 14 December 1962, remained, and continued to participate in the NFL and Singapore FA Cup, even winning the Singapore FA Cup twice, in 2003 and 2004 (years in which professional clubs in the S. League did not participate). The professional club and the amateur club even played against each other in an FA Cup tie in October 1997, which the professional club won 8-2. The amateur club ceased to exist by the end of the 2000s.

=== S.League era (1996–2017) ===
Tampines did not finish higher than sixth place in the first six seasons of the S.League. In 2002, the Stags secured the services of Malaysian coach, Chow Kwai Lam, who guided them to the Singapore Cup and two fourth-place finishes.

==== Vorawan Chitavanich era (2004–2010) ====
The 2000s marked the golden era of Tampines Rovers under Thai head coach Vorawan Chitavanich, during which the club amassed a squad filled with stalwarts like Nazri Nasir, Noh Alam Shah, Sead Muratović, Fahrudin Mustafić and Rezal Hassan. Vorawan also recruited fellow both Thailand players, Santi Chaiyaphuak and Choketawee Promrut to strengthen the team. Together, they clinched Tampines Rovers's first S.League and Singapore Cup double in 2004. The following season, they successfully defended their S.League title in 2005, were named the "S.League Team of the Decade" and became the first Singapore team to win the ASEAN Club Championship. The Stags were the 2006 Singapore Cup champions, but finished runners-up to SAFFC in the league. Tampines Rovers then ended the 2007 season in third place finishing two points behind league champions and runners-up, SAFFC and Home United. Vorawan also recruited more Thai players like Attapong Kittichamratsak, Sutee Suksomkit, Sanrawat Dechmitr in their foreign quota for the 2008 season.

==== Three-peat champions (2011–2013) ====
In 2011, Tampines Rovers appointed Steven Tan as head coach, replacing Vorawan who was promoted to technical director. On the pitch, club stalwarts like Mustafić Fahrudin and Aliff Shafaein, who were part of the 2004 and 2005 winning sides, were joined by the likes of Aleksandar Đurić, Benoît Croissant, and Jamil Ali. The Stags then went on to win three consecutive S.League titles in 2011, 2012 and 2013, and 4 consecutive Singapore Community Shield in 2011, 2012, 2013 and 2014. Tampines Rovers also went on to win the Plate in the 2014 Singapore League Cup.

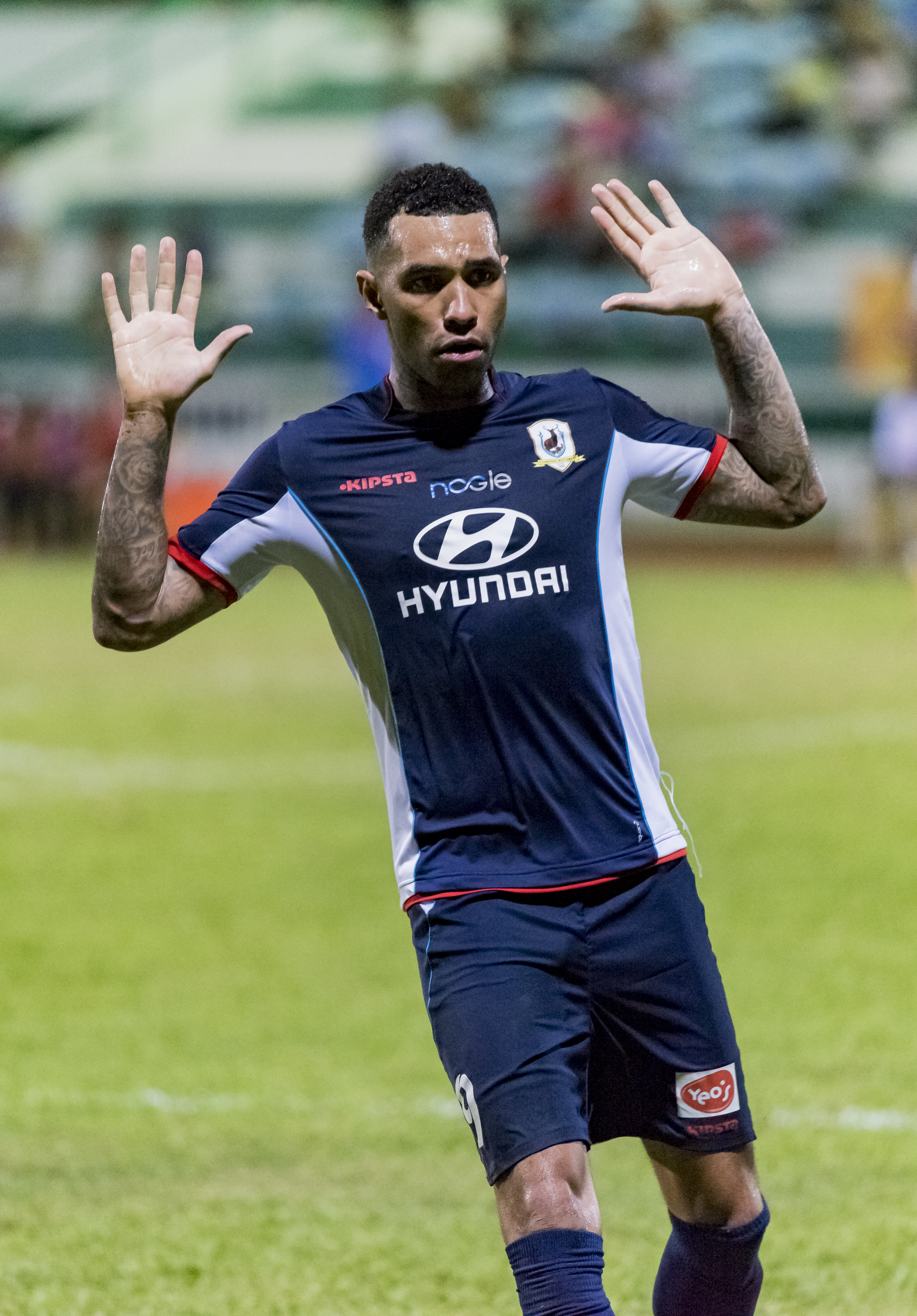
Jermaine Pennant was the talk of the town buzzing through the local football which saw an initial spike in interest at Tampines Rovers games that saw crowds of more than 4,000 turning up to see him play.

On 19 January 2016, Former Arsenal and Liverpool winger, Jermaine Pennant signed a one-year contract which he took a 70% pay cut from his salary earned at Wigan Athletic. It was reported that he would earn a salary of SGD$40,000 (£19,500) per month, which made him the highest-paid player in the history of the domestic professional football league.

For the 2016 season, with the club signing 9 Lions XII players, Tampines Rovers began with 6 unbeaten matches in the S.League. In February, Tampines Rovers started with the 2016 AFC Cup being drawn in Group E with Ceres from Philippines, Selangor from Malaysia and Sheikh Jamal Dhanmondi from Bangladesh. Tampines Rovers finished second place in Group E which saw them through to the Round of 16 with 10 points leaving Selangor F.A behind, with 2 points' difference. The Round of 16 was won with 10 men by Tampines Rovers versus Mohun Bagan from India by a late goal from Afiq Yunos in the after extra time which resulted in 1–2 win at the Indira Gandhi Athletic Stadium. This was also V. Sundramoorthy's last match before taking on the Singapore national team job as care taker. V. Sundramoorthy's successor was his assistant coach, Akbar Nawas. He was appointed to be the next head coach of Tampines Rovers followed with 8 straight wins and 28 goals. Tampines Rovers started the 2016 Singapore Cup with a double win playing against Philippines club Global in the quarter-finals before facing another club from same country, Ceres in the semi-finals which will see the Stags as the finalist of the 2016 Singapore Cup. On 14 September 2016, Tampines Rovers continued their 2016 AFC Cup Quarter-finals facing Bengaluru from India but was knocked out on a narrow 1–0 aggregate score on a 2 leg basis. The Stags finished the season as runner-ups in the league with 1 points' difference to Albirex Niigata (S).

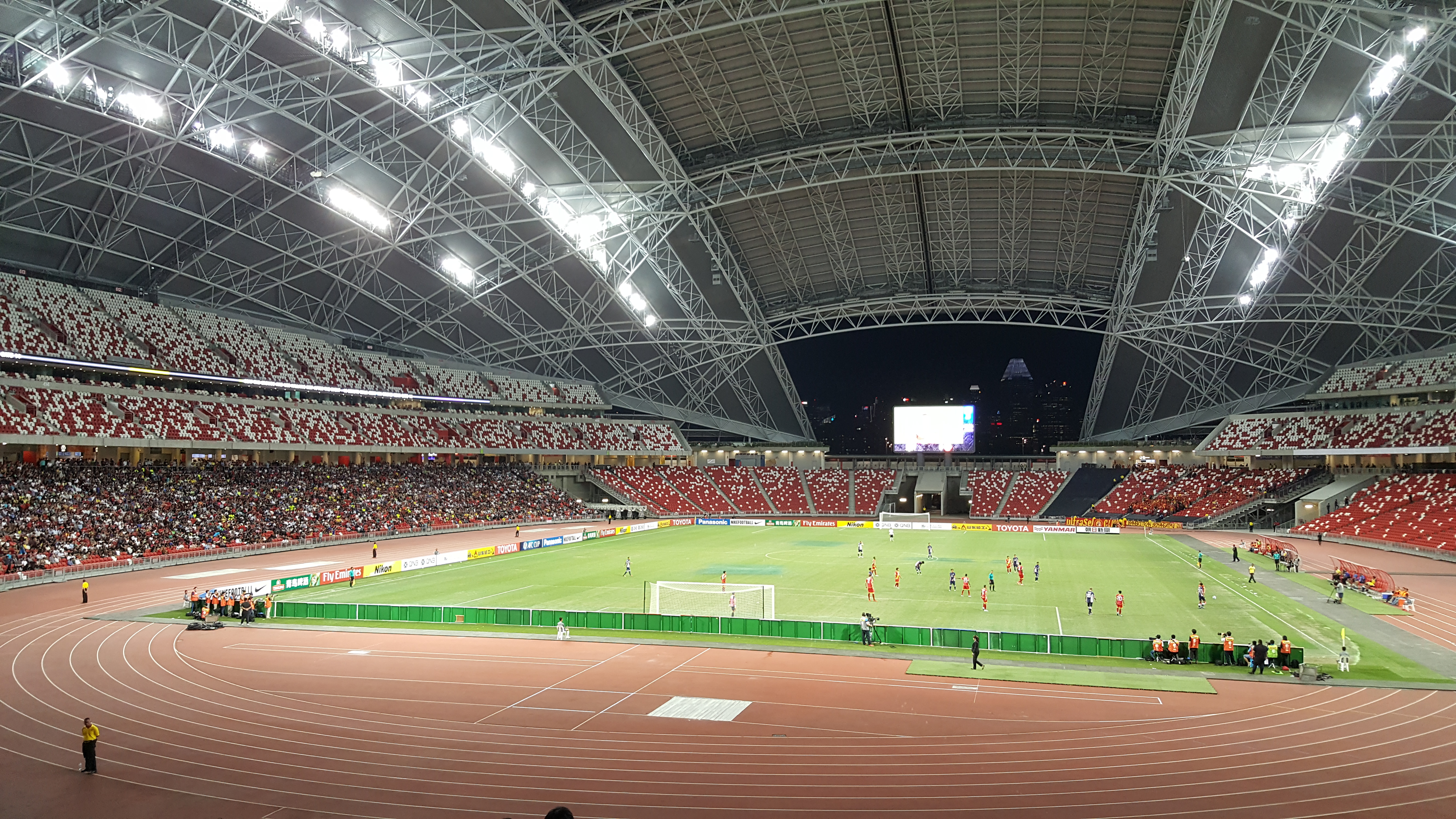
Tampines Rovers vs Selangor during the 2016 AFC Cup group stages on 10 May 2016 at the Singapore National Stadium.

In view of the financial woes faced by the club during the 2016 season, drastic measures were taken before the start of 2017 season. These would include cut in players and technical staff's salaries, shutting down of fruit machines to name a few. Club chairman, Mr Krishna Ramachandra had decided to make sweeping changes within the club to avoid the same issues happening as last season. The 3 foreign imports from last season, Billy Mehmet, Jordan Webb and Jermaine Pennant had been released from the club with them joining DPMM, Warriors and Bury respectively. The club had also ended their 15-year association with their long-term sponsor, Hyundai. A significant number of the playing staffs had also left the club as well, notably star player, Hafiz Abu Sujad who left the club for Thai League 2 side, BBCU.

The club had signed a trio of foreign young players to replace the 3 that had departed the end of last season. They would include former Ceres utility player, Son Yong Chan, Japanese teenager winger, Ryutaro Megumi and former Croatia U17 International, Ivan Jakov Džoni. They also signed a couple of local free agents. Notable local signings would include Singapore National Team Defensive Pairing, Madhu Mohana and Daniel Bennett from Warriors and Geylang International. The most drastic change during this period would be the sudden resignation of coach Akbar Nawas , who left the club just one month before the start of the season. He was replaced by former Garena Young Lions Coach, Jürgen Raab. Gavin Lee joined the club as an assistant coach. The Stags started off the 2017 campaign losing the 2017 Singapore Community Shield to Albirex Niigata (S).

The Stags took on Global in the AFC Champions League Play-offs. However, they lost 2–0, leading to them playing in the 2017 AFC Cup. The Stags were drawn in Group G with Ceres–Negros from Philippines, Hà Nội from Vietnam and FELDA United from Malaysia. Unfortunately, they ended up in third place with 2 wins and 4 losses.

Midway through the season, club chairman, Krishna Ramachandra had announced that he would be stepping down as chairman of the club, citing commitment issues as the reason. He stayed on as club chairman to assist in FAS in the auditing and settling the accounts of the club prior to the date of his official step down (22 August 2017). On 30 August 2017, Desmond Ong had been confirmed by FAS as the new chairman of the club. He also appointed a brand new committee for the club. The Stags finished the season as runner-ups in the league with 8 points' difference to Albirex Niigata (S).

=== Singapore Premier League era (2018–present) ===
The 2018 season marked the beginning of the newly revamped Singapore Premier League era. The club started their 2018 season with an AFC Champions League Play-offs against Bali United but lost 3–1 seeing the Stags dropped to the 2018 AFC Cup. To ensure the job security of the players, Tampines Rovers started offering longer-term contracts to their players. They have 3 models of contracts for their players. The first kind of contract entails the players being able to obtain a set increment at the end of every year. The second kind of contract (mainly for the U23 players) comprises a year-end review at the end of the season to decide on the value of the increment. The last kind of contract entails a fixed salary, ie fhe salary would remain the same for the duration of the contract. Most of their players are securing a 2-3-year deal with the club.

Despite agreeing to a 3-year deal, the club has allowed midfielder, Shahdan Sulaiman, to go on a season-long loan to Melaka United, in view of long-term benefits for both clubs and the player. Some of the national players in the club had also moved on to play in overseas leagues as well. Thus the club had signed quality replacements to fill in the shoes for the players who had departed the club for other clubs. The club had also retained the services of Japanese midfielder, Ryutaro Megumi for the 2018 season. They had also brought back Canadian winger, Jordan Webb from Warriors to fill up the foreign quota of the team. The club has also signed quite a number of young players (mainly from the National U20 Squad and Tampines Rovers Prime League) to fill up the minimum quota of U23 players needed in the team for the new season.

The club signed a 2-year technical sponsorship deal with Danish Sportswear Company, Hummel in a deal worth S$100,000 per season. They would be providing the club with their Home, Away, Third Jerseys, as well as the training and team wear. They would not be having any main jersey sponsor in this upcoming season as the management had decided that the word "Hormat" (Respect in Malay) would be emblazoned across the chest for the upcoming season. They debuted their new home jersey during the AFC Champions League Play-off against Bali United. The away and third kit would be revealed in February 2018. The club faced Johor Darul Ta'zim from Malaysia, Persija Jakarta from Indonesia and Sông Lam Nghệ An from Vietnam in the 2018 AFC Cup after failing to advance from the 2018 AFC Champions League qualifying play-offs. Their first game was played on 10 February 2018 against Sông Lam Nghệ An.

The club has also announced partnership with local private football academy JSSL Singapore. JSSL would look into the development of youth players from Under-6 to Under-14 age categories. The best players from the U6 to U14 categories would than be fast tracked to the stags U16 and U19 teams in the club's Center of Excellence and ultimately the first team. JSSL Singapore's general manager, Gavin Lee has also been assisting Head Coach, Jurgen Raab in the first team matters as Assistant Coach.

Head Coach Jurgen was relieved of his duties on 9 October 2018. In his two-year stint with Tampines Rovers, he brought them to finish in the league's second place in 2017 and fourth place in 2018.

==== Gavin Lee reign (2019–2025) ====
Tampines Rovers started the 2019 season making a slew of changes to both the team coaching set up and as well as the playing staff this off season. There was an overhaul of the technical team as Khadir Yahaya became the advisor while the previous season's assistant coach, Lee, was promoted to first-team coach while he completes his AFC "A" Coaching License. Former club captain, Mustafić Fahrudin, stayed on with the club after his retirement to be the assistant coach of the team. Former player, Isa Halim was brought in to be the fitness coach, together with goalkeeper coach, William Phang forms the new technical team. The team had also signed a number of young players to the team from the National Football Academy, they had also signed 2 new Serbian U-21 players, Zehrudin Mehmedović and Mirza Delimeđac. At the same time the team had also signed goalkeeper, Zufairuuz Rudy from Hougang United. Shahdan Sulaiman had also returned from his loan stint at Melaka United. As backup goalkeeper, Haikal Hasnol was loaned to Home United due to National Service Commitments. Irfan Fandi had also been loaned to Young Lions due to National Service Commitments as well. Notable players such as Hafiz Abu Sujad, Afiq Yunos and Fazrul Nawaz had moved to Hougang United. At the same time, Fahrudin Mustafić had also retired from the game and is now working as an assistant coach in the team.

In pre-season, the team had taken on NFL Side, Singapore Cricket Club before traveling to Thailand to participate in the LEO Cup playing against Chiangrai United and Chiangrai City. After coming back from Thailand, they took on NFL Side, Katong FC before facing Johor Darul Ta'zim II and Albirex Niigata (S). Notably in their final friendly game against Albirex Niigata Singapore, they beat Albirex Niigata Singapore 4–0. In the attendance of a healthy crowd watching the friendly game. It was also announced that Hyundai has returned to be the main sponsor of the club since not partnering with the club from 2017. ANA Courier Express and Gatorade has continued their partnership with the club as well. ecoWise has also come on board as well. Hummel had also released the club's New Jersey and the jersey had been specially designed and made for the club.

Tampines Rovers was drawn in Group F with Hà Nội, Yangon United and Nagaworld. Their first official game of the season would be a trip to Yangon, Myanmar to take on Yangon United in the 2019 AFC Cup. A game in which they came from behind to beat Yangon United 3–1 after trailing at the end of the first half. Thanks to goals from Khairul Amri, Zehrudin Mehmedović and Ryutaro Megumi. The Stags 2019 AFC Cup campaign come to an end when they ended the group stage matches with 13 points together with Hà Nội which will see the Vietnamese club finishing as group leaders with a 18+ goals difference qualifying to the next round.

They would kick start their campaign in the 2019 Singapore Premier League season on 3 March 2019 against Hougang United at the Jalan Besar Stadium. After a streak of impressive wins, the team had a slight dip of form drawing the next four games, winning two and losing two. At the same time top striker, Khairul Amri left to join FELDA United in the Malaysia Super League. Tampines Rovers went on to beat the Warriors 4–3 in the finals of the 2019 Singapore Cup, ending the 2019 football season with a trophy.

The 2020 season marked the 75 years since the club's founding. On 14 January 2020, the club kicks off its 2020 campaign against Bali United in an AFC Champions League play off. The game ended in a thrilling 5–3, with Bali United winning the tie with 2 goals in extra-time. This meant that Tampines Rovers would play in the 2020 AFC Cup instead ending up in Group H of the competition with Kaya–Iloilo, PSM Makassar and Shan United. On 22 February 2020, Tampines Rovers won their record 5th time Singapore Community Shield against Hougang United. The Stags goes on to start the league magnificently, winning their first three fixtures without conceding a goal and scoring seven along the way, putting four past recently acquired Lion City Sailors. On the other hand, The 2020 AFC Cup was no different, winning two and drawing one of their three games. However, due to the COVID-19 pandemic in Singapore, the league was halted from 27 March 2020.

The Ministry of Culture, Community and Youth approved the season recommencement on 17 October 2020. Competition rule changes included the provision for two water breaks during a match, and clubs will be able to use up to five substitutions (in defined windows after half-time). In addition only 11 more matches per team were to be played over 49 days. With the season ending on 5 December 2020. Tampines began their return with their first loss of the season to Hougang United. However they recovered with a win over favourites, Albirex Niigata Singapore. They went on to finish the season unbeaten in their next nine games but ultimately finished 2nd, three points off Albirex Niigata (S) at top spot. It was their draws at Geylang International, Balestier Khalsa and Hougang United that cost them. However, they qualified for the 2021 AFC Champions League due to Albirex Niigata's inability to qualify for Continental competitions as they were a satellite team of Albirex Niigata of Japan.

Tampines Rovers 2021 AFC Champions League Group Stage debut against Gamba Osaka at the Lokomotiv Stadium in Tashkent, Uzbekistan on 25 June 2021

The 2021 season marked Tampines debut in the 2021 AFC Champions League who were drawn in Group H taking on two-time AFC Champions League winners Jeonbuk Hyundai Motors of Korea Republic, 2020 J1 League runners-up and 2008 AFC Champions League winners Gamba Osaka of Japan and Thailand outfits, Chiangrai United. While it was a tough debut for Lee's charges, veteran defender Daniel Bennett did create a slice of history when he scored their only goal during their fifth group encounter against Gamba Osaka in an 8–1 defeat at the Bunyodkor Stadium in Tashkent, Uzbekistan. At 43 years and 181 days old, Bennett also eclipsed Dejan Damjanović (39y 341d) as the oldest ever scorer in the tournament's history. The 2021 Singapore Premier League season ended with Tampines Rovers finishing in 4th place which will see them qualified for the 2022 AFC Cup.

Kyoga Nakamura being handed a new five-year lengthy deal by the Stags in an unprecedented move in Singaporean football, making it the longest contract extension in Singaporean league history reaffirming his commitment to the club. The lengthy deal would see Kyoga remaining as a Stag till December 2026 and could also pave the way for another naturalized footballer and also being a Singaporean citizenship. Tampines Rovers also announced a five-year contract for promising star, Shah Shahiran and Joel Chew committing their future to the club. Club chairman Desmond Ong highlighted the bold decision to offer long-term contracts to players as a way to improve job stability. He is proud of keeping the club competitive domestically and representing the nation in continental competitions despite financial limitations. Ong said when he replaced former club chairman who is a lawyer, Krishna Ramachandra in 2017, the club were $3 million in debt. Together with Ong committee members, they worked hard to reduce it. As a result of him putting his own money into the club, the bulk of the debt is owed to Ong, who is comfortable with the arrangement as it allows the club to operate without external financial pressure.

The Stags started off the 2022 season with in a 2–2 draw against Balestier Khalsa on 26 February 2022. Tampines Rovers started off the 2022 AFC Cup group stage in late June playing at the Kuala Lumpur Stadium as a centralised venue to face Kuala Lumpur City and PSM Makassar however they lost both matches. The 2022 Singapore Cup returns after a 2-years hiatus due to the competition being cancelled due to COVID-19 pandemic in Singapore which saw the Stags having a great run to the Cup Final before losing to 3–2 to Hougang United. Advisor Kadir left the club to be the head of youth football at Thai League 1 club, BG Pathum United.

The 2023 season saw star player, Zehrudin Mehmedović leaving the club after staying with the club for 4 years. Tampines Rovers than replace the last foreigner slot bringing in Miloš Zlatković, Lion City Sailors stars, Faris Ramli and Saifullah Akbar also joined the club. Faris started the first 4 league games scoring a goal in each of the consecutive four matches. The Stags see themselves as host of the 2023–24 AFC Cup qualifying ASEAN play-offs zone against Cambodian side, Phnom Penh Crown at the Jalan Besar Stadium on 23 August 2023.

===== Collaboration and club overhaul (2023–2025) =====
On 23 September 2023, Tampines Rovers inked a three-year collaboration with Thailand club, BG Pathum United. As part of the agreement, the Singaporean outfit will be temporarily renamed as BG Tampines Rovers from 2024 onwards. Kadir who was the former advisor of the club and current head of youth football for BG Pathum, played a pivotal role in securing the deal. As part of the collaboration, the club took two new Thailand nationals, 19-year-old forward Thitipat Ekarunpong and 18-year-old defender Thanet Suknate on loan. Thitipat and Thanet will be the first Thai players in the league since 2013, when Theerawekin Seehawong turned out for Woodlands Wellington. Tampines Rovers also qualified for the AFC Champions League Two as the 2nd best placed local team in the previous season. On 18 July 2024, Tampines Rovers maintain their seven unbeaten streak (6 wins, 1 draw) where the club defeated league rivals Lion City Sailors 5–0 at the Bishan Stadium to stay on top of the league table. Tampines Rovers then participated in the inaugural 2024–25 AFC Champions League Two group stage alongside Thailand club Bangkok United, Vietnamese club Nam Định and Hong Kong club Lee Man. On 18 September 2024, the club then played their first match against Bangkok United at the Thammasat Stadium where Seia Kunori scored a brace for the club but it wasn't enough as the Stags lost 4–2 to the host. On 22 September in the away fixture against DPMM, Boris Kopitović overtake Aleksandar Đurić to become Tampines Rovers all-time leading goalscorer in the club history. During the second round of the AFC Champions League Two match against Lee Man at home soil on 2 October, after conceding an early goal from the visitors, Boris Kopitović equalised the match at 1–1 right before half time from the penalty spot. In the second half, Faris Ramli and Seia Kunori both scored a goal to secured a 3–1 win against Lee Man. On 27 November, Seia Kunori scored the only goal in the match to end Bangkok United winning streak in the group stage at home. On the final day fixtures against Lee Man at the Mong Kok Stadium desperately needing a win, Tampines Rovers felled to a goalless draw which sees the team finishing in third place in the group thus missing out on qualifying to the round of 16.

After the 2024–25 season ended, Tampines Rovers experienced a major transitions, losing most of their players, coaching staff, and outgoing club chairman Desmond Ong, who had been with the club since 2017. Head coach Lee also departed to take over as interim head coach of the Singapore national team, ending his tenure at the club which began in 2019. Fans favourite, Boris Kopitović and Kyoga Nakamura left in search of new challenges which then see the club shifted its focus towards a full-scale overhaul strategy.

==== Rise to prominence (2025–present) ====
On 17 June 2025, head coach Gavin Lee left the club after eight years in charge to manage the Singapore national football team. On 20 June 2025, former head coach Akbar Nawas returned to the Stags, after nearly a decade, to helm the club ahead of the 2025–26 season. The club also announced vice-president Shungo Sakamoto as the club new chairman who is the executive director and founder of investment company Sakamoto Capital which was previously known as Black Clover. Former club chairman, Ong will be a member of the club’s management committee as the club look forward to the 2025–26 AFC Champions League Two campaign. Tampines Rovers also returned to the 2025–26 ASEAN Club Championship after winning the 2005 edition where the club was drawn alongside 2024–25 edition champion, Buriram United with BG Pathum United, Malaysian club Selangor, Vietnamese club Công An Hà Nội and Filipino club Dynamic Herb Cebu in the group stage.

In the curtain raiser match in the 2025 Singapore Community Shield on 16 August 2025, against all odds, Tampines Rovers thrashed domestic champions, Lion City Sailors 4–1 to win the Community Shield. In the next match in the 2025–26 ASEAN Club Championship where they make their return to the tournament after 20 years, Tampines Rovers won 3–1 against Dynamic Herb Cebu in Manila on 20 August. During the 2025–26 AFC Champions League Two fixtures, Tampines Rovers than returned to Philippines this time round in Capas facing off against Kaya–Iloilo at the New Clark City Athletics Stadium on 18 September where Tampines Rovers won 3–0. Tampines Rovers than played their second fixtures at home on 2 October against BG Pathum United where the Stags won 2–1 putting them with six points on top of the table. Against all out, Tampines Rovers defeated Pohang Steelers at home on 23 October where Hide Higashikawa scored the fastest goal in the AFC Champions League Two history at 16 seconds giving them a 1–0 win over the Korean club. In the club next fixtures against the same opponent this time at the Pohang Steel Yard, Tampines draw against the Korean club putting them on top of the table still undefeated. On 27 November, Tampines Rovers defeated Kaya–Iloilo 5–3 in their home fixture, securing qualification to the 2025–26 AFC Champions League Two round of 16 as group leaders with five wins, one draw and zero lost. In the round of 16, Tampines Rovers faced off against Công An Hà Nội. Tampines Rovers initially suffered a heavy 4–0 defeat in the first leg in Hanoi but awarded a 3–0 victory in the end after the Vietnamese club fielded two ineligible players who should be serving a one-match suspension. In the 2nd leg fixtures at home on 14 February 2026, Tampines Rovers is without their team captain, Syazwan Buhari, who is out with injury. The club then fielded 16-year-old goalkeeper Kasey Rogers making his professional debut in the tournament. Tampines Rovers went on to win 3–1 hence qualifying to the quarter-finals with a 6–1 on aggregate, facing off against Thailand club Bangkok United. However, Tampines Rovers bowed out from the tournament in the quarter-finals after losing 3–2 on aggregate.

Tampines Rovers then started off the 2026–27 season with a pre-season trip to Indonesia after being invited to participate in the 2026 Piala Presiden facing off against Persib Bandung, Arema and DPMM. The club also appointed Nazri Nasir as their head coach for the season becoming the sixth coaching appointment in 13 months. Tampines Rovers also see themselves playing in the 2026–27 AFC Champions League Two where the club was then drawn in Group G alongside Japanese club Machida Zelvia, Chinese club Shanghai Shenghua and Cambodian club Preah Khan Reach Svay Rieng.

== Team image ==
=== Crest and colours ===
The club selected the Stag as its animal mascot as the animal is a symbol of wisdom, its antlers are associated with the tree of life and in Chinese culture, it is a symbol of virility. The club's colours are predominantly yellow for its Home kit, with a mixture of black, blue and white for its away colours.

=== Supporters ===
==== The Yellow Brigade ====
Formed in 2012, The Yellow Brigade (TYB) was the very first unofficial supporters’ group for Tampines Rovers. The group composed mainly of members of the Singapore national team supporters’ group, Lions All The Way (LATW). Members of TYB were staunch supporters of the club and greatly contributed to the overall match-day experience.

==== The Yellow Knights ====
Formed in 2019, The Yellow Knights (TYK) is the second unofficial supporters’ group. TYK was formed by a small group of passionate fans with the shared goal of improving the match-day atmosphere at games. The group have been described and been recognised as Ultras, although the group has never formerly regarded themselves as such. TYK is well known in the country for their passionate support at every game.

==== The Stand ====
The general Tampines Rover's fanbase has been collectively referred to as “The Stand” – the name likely derived from its similarity to “The Stags”.

Since the move back to Tampines, the club's average attendance per match is one of the highest in the league. As of June 2023, the club is second only to the Lion City Sailors in average attendance in the league.

== Stadium ==
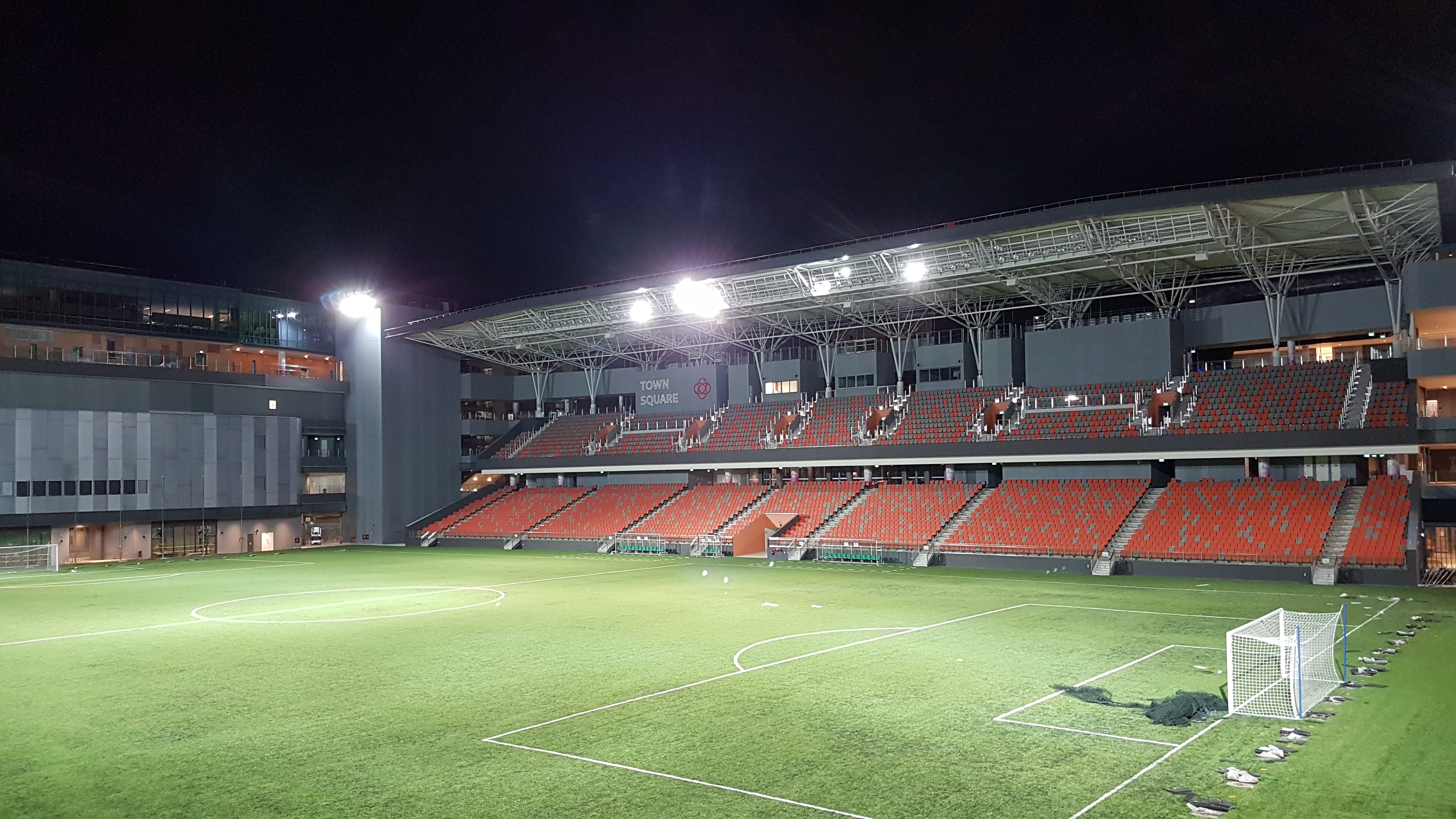
Our Tampines Hub, home ground for the Stags since July 2017

The Stags initially played their home games at the Tampines Stadium. In 2011, the stadium was demolished to build an integrated community and lifestyle building Our Tampines Hub (OTH) which includes a football stadium. Never before in Singapore sports history has a football match played within 'Our Tampines Hub', the first-ever integrated community and lifestyle hub that brings together multiple agencies to offer a comprehensive and diverse range of services, programmes and facilities.

During the construction of OTH, the Stags used Clementi Stadium as their homeground from 2012 to 2014 and then Jurong West Stadium from 2015 till the first half of 2017.

In 2017, the Stags moved back to OTH, utilising OTH's Town Square, which has a seating capacity of 5,000, to play their home games. On 28 July 2017, Tampines Rovers had their first match at their newly opened stadium against Brunei DPMM FC and won 2–0. That match saw a crowd of 4,676 fans.

In 2019, in view of the shared stadium initiative by Football Association Singapore, Geylang International will share OTH as their home ground. It caused a lot of unrest within the local football community, stating that without its spiritual home, the clubs are losing its identity.

== Kit suppliers and shirt sponsors ==
Year	Kit manufacturer	Main sponsors
1996–1998	(Germany) Uhlsport	(Singapore) Star Cruise
1999–2000	(England) Umbro	(Singapore) Star Cruise
2001–2003	(Australia) DAL	(South Korea) Hyundai
2004	In-house production	(South Korea) Hyundai
2005–2010	(Australia) DAL	(South Korea) Hyundai
2013–2015	(Japan) Mikasa	(South Korea) Hyundai
2016	(France) Kipsta	(South Korea) Hyundai
2017	(Germany) Jako	(Singapore) Nogle
2018	(Germany) Hummel	In-house production as 'Hormat'
2018	(Germany) Hummel	(South Korea) Hyundai
2019	(Germany) Hummel	(South Korea) Hyundai
2020	(Japan) Mizuno	(South Korea) Hyundai
2021–2023	(Japan) Mizuno	(Japan) ANA Courier Express (Thailand) Bangkok Glass (2023 Singapore Cup matches only)
2024–2026	(Thailand) Warrix	(Thailand) Bangkok Glass
2026–2028	(Thailand) Warrix	(Japan) FMBG

=== Others partnership with the club ===
Details of partnership	Partnership
Physiotherapy Partner	The Physio Circle
Investment Partner	Construction Investment Managers
Recovery Partner	Therabody, WeAreReadySG
Nutrition Partner	Myprotein
Strength & Conditioning Partner	Dr.stretch Singapore
Finance Partner	Black Clover

== Affiliated clubs ==
=== Former ===
- (Thailand) BG Pathum United (2023–2026)

On 23 September 2023, Tampines Rovers inked a three-year collaboration with Thai League 1 club BG Pathum United where BG will also become the main sponsor appearing on the front of the club jersey. Following the conclusion of the 2025–26 season, Tampines Rovers Football Club and BG Pathum United concluded their partnership.

=== Current ===
- (Japan) Machida Zelvia (2026–present)

On 5 July 2026, Tampines Rovers announced a landmark three-year partnership with J1 League club Machida Zelvia. As part of the partnership, CyberAgent company will also become the club main sponsor appearing on the front of the jersey.

== Players ==
=== First-team squad ===
As of 6 September 2026

Note: Flags indicate national team as defined under FIFA eligibility rules; some limited exceptions apply. Players may hold more than one non-FIFA nationality.

No.	Pos.	Nation	Player
2	DF	SGP	Raoul Suhaimi
5	DF	SGP	Amirul Adli
6	MF	SGP	Jacob Mahler
8	MF	SGP	Shah Shahiran (4th captain)
9	FW	JPN	Nabel Yoshitaka Furusawa (on loan from Kashiwa Reysol)
10	FW	SGP	Faris Ramli (vice-captain)
11	MF	JPN	Shodai Yokoyama
14	FW	SGP	Marc Ryan Tan ^{U23}
15	MF	SGP	Ong Yu En ^{U23}
16	DF	NIR	Dylan Fox
17	DF	SGP	Amirul Haikal
18	FW	JPN	Kenshin Yamazaki (on loan from Fujieda MYFC)

No.	Pos.	Nation	Player
19	MF	SGP	Caden Lim ^{U21}
20	MF	SGP	Saifullah Akbar
21	MF	SGP	Iman Hakim ^{U23}
23	DF	SGP	Irfan Najeeb
24	GK	SGP	Syazwan Buhari (captain)
25	FW	JPN	Hide Higashikawa
27	MF	SGP	Anton Yen Goh
28	GK	SGP	Zharfan Rohaizad
33	MF	JPN	Seiga Sumi
49	MF	JPN	Yuki Kobayashi
71	DF	SGP	Irfan Fandi
81	MF	JPN	Yuma Kimura (On loan from Renofa Yamaguchi)
88	MF	JPN	Koya Kazama

=== Reserve League (SPL2) squad ===
Note: Flags indicate national team as defined under FIFA eligibility rules; some limited exceptions apply. Players may hold more than one non-FIFA nationality.

No.	Pos.	Nation	Player
29	FW	SGP	Rasul Ramli ^{U21}
30	FW	SGP	Lim Zheng Wu ^{U21}
37	MF	SGP	Naufal Mohammad ^{U21}
47	MF	SGP	Matthias Koesno ^{U21}
52	GK	SGP	Jarec Ng ^{U21}
55	DF	SGP	Kegan Phang ^{U21}
56	DF	SGP	Zeeshan Iskandar ^{U21}
61	DF	SGP	Shafrel Ariel ^{U21}

No.	Pos.	Nation	Player
66	DF	SGP	Hadirul Harraz ^{U21}
68	MF	AUS	Liam Buckley ^{FP U21}
71	MF	SGP	Ilham Iskandar ^{U21}
73	DF	SGP	Adly Nufail ^{U21}
77	DF	SGP	Sky Yeo Sze Kai ^{U21}
78	MF	SGP	Qylfie Ryan Fazlie ^{U21}

=== On loan ===
Note: Flags indicate national team as defined under FIFA eligibility rules; some limited exceptions apply. Players may hold more than one non-FIFA nationality.

No.	Pos.	Nation	Player
—	MF	SGP	Joel Chew (at Young Lions until June 2026)
41	FW	SGP	Nicolas Michael Beninger (National Service till November 2026)
54	MF	SGP	Jovan Ang (National Service till November 2026)
58	MF	SGP	Caelan Cheong (National Service till November 2026)

== Management and staff ==
=== Management ===
Position	Name
Chairman	(Japan) Shungo Sakamoto
Vice Chairman & Sporting Director	(Japan) Tadanari Lee
Advisor	(Singapore) Desmond Ong
Honorary Secretary	(Singapore) Leong Wing Kong
Honorary Treasurer	(Singapore) Ian Lau
Committee Member	Sushil George Nicholas Hunter

=== Technical staff ===
Position	Name
General Manager	(Singapore) William Phang
Head Coach	(Singapore) Nazri Nasir
Assistant Coach	(Japan) Jun Marques Davidson
Goalkeeper Coach	(Malaysia) Ng Wei Xian
Fitness Coach	(Germany) Jens Eiberger
Club Doctor	(Singapore) Dr Dinesh Sirisena
Video analyst	(Singapore) Nurhalis Azmi
Physiotherapist	(Singapore) Shoban Rahulapaskaran (Singapore) Calvin Chua (Singapore) Toh Pei Qi (Singapore) Sarita Mok (Singapore) Tan Xin Ning
Sports Trainer	(Singapore) Seishen Ratnagopal
Logistics Officer	(Singapore) Goh Koon Hiang
Photographer	(Singapore) Nasrullah Khirwani

== Honours ==
Type	Honour	Titles	Season
League	Singapore Premier League	5	2004, 2005, 2011, 2012, 2013
League	National Football League Division One	3	1979, 1980, 1984
Cup	Singapore Cup	4	2002, 2004, 2006, 2019
Cup	Singapore Community Shield	6	2011, 2012, 2013, 2014, 2020, 2025
Cup	Singapore League Cup 'Plate Winners'	1	2014
International	ASEAN Club Championship	1	2005

Bold is for those competition that are currently active.

== Award winners ==
=== Domestic ===
- League Player of the Year
  - (Singapore) Noh Alam Shah (2005)
  - (Singapore) Aleksandar Đurić (2012)
  - (Japan) Hide Higashikawa (2025–26)
- League Young Player of the Year
  - (Singapore) Fahrudin Mustafić (2004)
  - (Singapore) Shariff Abdul Samat (2007)
  - (Singapore) Khairul Amri (2008)
- League Coach of the Year
  - (Thailand) Vorawan Chitavanich (2004, 2005, 2010)
- League Top Scorer
  - (Singapore) Mirko Grabovac (2005)
  - (Singapore) Aleksandar Đurić (2013)
  - (Montenegro) Boris Kopitović (2022)
- League Goal of the Year
  - (Singapore) Zulfadhmi Suzliman against Albirex Niigata (S) on 20 May 2018.
- League Golden Gloves
  - (Singapore) Hassan Sunny (2009)
  - (Singapore) Syazwan Buhari (2023, 2024–25)
- League Team of the Year
  - (Japan) Ryutaro Megumi (2017)
  - (Singapore) Shahdan Sulaiman (2019)
  - (Singapore) Irwan Shah (2019)
  - (Singapore) Syazwan Buhari (2020, 2023, 2024–25)
  - (Singapore) Daniel Bennett (2020)
  - (Singapore) Kyoga Nakamura (2020, 2022, 2023)
  - (Montenegro) Boris Kopitović (2022)
  - (Serbia) Miloš Zlatković (2023, 2024–25)
  - (Japan) Seia Kunori (2024–25)
  - (Japan) Takeshi Yoshimoto (2025–26)
  - (Japan) Yuki Kobayashi (2025–26)
  - (Japan) Koya Kazama (2025–26)
  - (Japan) Hide Higashikawa (2025–26)
  - (Singapore) Shah Shahiran (2025–26)

=== Others ===
- People's Choice Award
  - (Serbia) Sead Muratović (2002)
  - (Singapore) Zulkarnaen Zainal (2005)

== Records and statistics ==
As of 26 May 2026 after the 2025–26 season conclude.

=== Top 10 all-time appearances ===
Rank	Player	Years	Club appearances
1	(Singapore) Ayub Sudin	2002–2009, 2011–2018	334
2	(Singapore) Syazwan Buhari	2018–present	249
3	(Singapore) Yasir Hanapi	2016–2017 2018–2025	245
4	(Singapore) Ismadi Mukhtar	2010–2017	240
5	(Singapore) Shahdan Sulaiman	2006–2008, 2010–2011, 2013–2014, 2016, 2018	231
6	(Singapore) Imran Sahib	2008–2016, 2017	225
7	(Serbia) Sead Muratović	2000–2007	213
8	(Singapore) Jufri Taha	2010–2017	212
9	(Singapore) Irwan Shah	2016–2022	201
10	(Singapore) Taufik Suparno	2018–2026	197

=== Top 10 all-time scorers ===
Rank	Player	Club appearances	Total goals
1	(Montenegro) Boris Kopitović	138	110
2	(Singapore) Aleksandar Đurić	188	105
3	(Singapore) Khairul Amri	148	76
4	(Canada) Jordan Webb	119	53
5	(Singapore) Noh Alam Shah	133	50
6	(Singapore) Fahrudin Mustafić	334	44
7	(Singapore) Yasir Hanapi	245	42
8	(Singapore) Shahdan Sulaiman	231	39
9	(Singapore) Aliff Shafaein	173	38
10	(Singapore) Taufik Suparno	197	37

- Biggest wins: 9–0 vs Police SA (On 19 July 2014)
- Heaviest defeats: 9–0 vs (South Korea) Jeonbuk Hyundai Motors (On 1 July 2021)
- Youngest ever debutant: Rosyam Rosli ~ 16 years 2 months 28 days old (On 14 September 2013 vs Tanjong Pagar United)
- Oldest ever player: Aleksandar Đurić ~ 44 years 2 months 24 days old (On 5 November 2014 vs (Brunei) DPMM)
- Youngest goal scorers: Kegan Phang ~ 17 years 3 months 21 days old (On 14 May 2023 vs Tanjong Pagar United)
- Oldest goal scorers: Aleksandar Đurić ~ 43 years 9 months 11 days old (On 23 May 2014 vs Young Lions)

== Notable players ==
=== International capped players ===
AFC/OFC.: (Australia) Bradley Groves; (Australia) Justin Pasfield; (Afghanistan) Naim Rahimi; (Japan) Yuki Kobayashi; (Kyrgyzstan) Zakir Dzhalilov; (New Zealand) Chris Jackson; (New Zealand) Jake Butler; (Thailand) Attapong Kittichamratsak; (Thailand) Choketawee Promrut; (Thailand) Sanrawat Dechmitr; (Thailand) Santi Chaiyaphuak; (Thailand) Surachai Jaturapattarapong; (South Korea) Park Yo-seb	CAF. – NIL –	UEFA.: (Croatia) Saša Dreven; (Croatia) Ivan Jakov Džoni; (England) Jermaine Pennant; (Republic of Ireland) Billy Mehmet; (North Macedonia) Gligor Gligorov; (Malta) Trent Buhagiar; (Portugal) Andre Martins; (Serbia) Miljan Mrdaković; (Serbia) Miloš Zlatković; (Serbia) Zehrudin Mehmedović; (Socialist Federal Republic of Yugoslavia) Sead Muratović	CONMEBOL/ CONCACAF.: (Guadeloupe) Eddy Viator; (Haiti) Fabrice Noël

== Club captains ==
Year	Captain
1996–2003	(Singapore) TBC
2004–2008	(Singapore) Nazri Nasir
2009–2011	(Singapore) Zulkarnaen Zainal
2012	(Singapore) Aleksandar Đurić
2013–2018	(Singapore) Mustafić Fahrudin
2019	(Singapore) Shahdan Sulaiman
2021–2023	(Singapore) Yasir Hanapi
2024–present	(Singapore) Syazwan Buhari

== Managerial history ==
=== Performance by coach ===
The following table provides a summary of the coach appointed by the club.

Manager	Period	Achievements
(Singapore) Hussein Aljunied	8 February 1994 – 1 July 1996	
(Scotland) William Gallagher	2 July 1996 – 31 May 1997	
(Singapore) Chiang Boon Seng	4 June 1997 – 20 May 1998	
(Singapore) Robin Chan	21 May 1998 – 6 May 1999	
(Scotland) Jimmy Pearson	8 May 1999 – 31 December 1999	
(Serbia) Dragan Kazic	3 February 2000 – 4 September 2000	
(Singapore) V. Sivalingam	5 September 2000 – 20 June 2001	
(Singapore) Jita Singh	22 June 2001 – 10 April 2002	
(Malaysia) Kwai Lam Chow	11 April 2002 – 3 June 2003	– 2002 Singapore Cup
(Singapore) V. Sivalingam (2)	4 June 2003 – 11 June 2003	
(Scotland) Des Bulpin	12 June 2003 – 31 October 2003	
(Thailand) Vorawan Chitavanich	1 January 2004 – 31 December 2010	– 2004, 2005 S.League – 2004, 2006 Singapore Cup – 2005 ASEAN Club Championship
(Singapore) Steven Tan	1 January 2011 – 10 August 2012	– 2011 S.League – 2011, 2012 Singapore Community Shield
(Singapore) Tay Peng Kee	11 August 2012 – 31 December 2012	– 2012 S.League
(Croatia) Nenad Bacina	1 January 2013 – 28 May 2013	– 2013 Singapore Community Shield
(Singapore) Tay Peng Kee (2)	28 May 2013 – 27 November 2013	– 2013 S.League
(Singapore) Salim Moin	28 November 2013 – 27 April 2014	– 2014 Singapore Community Shield
(Singapore) Rafi Ali	27 April 2014 – 8 December 2014	
(Singapore) V. Sundramoorthy	9 December 2014 – 26 May 2016	
(Singapore) Akbar Nawas	27 May 2016 – 27 January 2017	
(Germany) Jürgen Raab	30 January 2017 – 9 October 2018	
(Singapore) Kadir Yahaya	9 October 2018 – 15 December 2019	
(Singapore) Gavin Lee	15 December 2019 – 17 June 2025	– 2019 Singapore Cup – 2020 Singapore Community Shield
(Singapore) Akbar Nawas (2)	20 June 2025 – 11 September 2025	– 2025 Singapore Community Shield
(Singapore) Noh Rahman	12 September 2025 – 14 February 2026	
(Nigeria) Robert Eziakor (interim)	14 February 2026 – 3 April 2026	
(Japan) Katsuhito Kinoshi	3 April 2026 – 15 April 2026	
(Singapore) William Phang (interim)	15 April 2026 – 2 July 2026	
(Singapore) Nazri Nasir	2 July 2026– Present	

== Season by season record ==
Season	League	Pos.	P	W	D	L	GS	GA	Pts	Singapore Cup	League Cup
1996-1	S.League	8th	14	3	3	8	18	27	12		
1996-2	S.League	7th	14	2	2	10	10	28	8		
1997	S.League	6th	16	4	3	9	22	38	15		
1998	S.League	6th	20	8	5	7	41	40	29	Group stage	
1999	S.League	10th	22	4	8	10	25	39	20	Quarter-finals	
2000	S.League	7th	22	7	6	9	30	27	27	Quarter-finals	
2001	S.League	6th	33	14	6	13	60	55	48	Group stage	
2002	S.League	4th	33	16	11	6	67	39	59	Winners	
2003	S.League	4th	33	17	3	2	63	40	59	Quarter-finals	
2004	S.League	1st	27	20	3	4	76	29	63	Winners	
2005	S.League	1st	27	18	3	6	77	35	57	Third place	
2006	S.League	2nd	30	20	8	2	71	36	68	Winners	
2007	S.League	3rd	33	24	5	4	77	32	77	Runners-up	Preliminary
2008	S.League	4th	33	20	5	8	66	37	65	Third place	Quarter-finals
2009	S.League	2nd	30	16	8	6	47	25	56	Quarter-finals	Quarter-finals
2010	S.League	2nd	33	21	6	6	68	30	69	Runners-up	Quarter-finals
2011	S.League	1st	33	25	3	5	71	25	78	Quarter-finals	Third place
2012	S.League	1st	24	16	4	4	49	24	52	Runners-up	Semi-finals
2013	S.League	1st	27	17	5	5	59	36	56	Round of 16	Quarter-finals
2014	S.League	3rd	27	14	7	6	44	32	49	Fourth place	Group stage
2015	S.League	2nd	27	14	6	7	42	25	48	Quarter-finals	Group stage
2016	S.League	2nd	24	15	4	5	50	28	49	Runners-up	Third place
2017	S.League	2nd	24	17	3	4	48	20	54	Quarter-finals	Group stage
2018	Singapore Premier League	4th	24	12	4	8	43	27	40	Quarter-finals	
2019	Singapore Premier League	2nd	24	12	8	4	52	29	44	Winners	
2020	Singapore Premier League	2nd	14	8	5	1	27	11	29		
2021	Singapore Premier League	4th	21	7	6	8	48	51	27		
2022	Singapore Premier League	3rd	28	15	5	8	76	57	50	Runners-up	
2023	Singapore Premier League	3rd	24	14	6	4	47	32	48	Third place	
2024–25	Singapore Premier League	2nd	32	19	7	6	84	37	64	Runners-up	
2025–26	Singapore Premier League	2nd	21	15	4	2	58	21	49	Runners-up	

== Performance in international competition ==
- AFC Champions League/AFC Champions League Elite: 1 appearances

2021: Group stage

- AFC Cup/AFC Champions League Two: 15 appearances

2005: Quarter-final
2006: Quarter-final
2007: Quarter-final
2011: Round of 16
2012: Group stage
2013: Group stage
2014: Group stage
2016: Quarter-final
2017: Group stage
2018: Group stage
2019: Group stage
2020: Cancelled
2022: Group stage
2023–24: Play-off round
2024–25: Group stage
2025–26: Quarter-final

- ASEAN Club Championship: 3 appearances

2005: Champions
2025–26: Group stage
2026–27:

== Continental record ==
Season	Competition	Round	Club	Home	Away	Aggregate
2005	AFC Cup	Group D	(Malaysia) Perak	4–2	1–2	1st out of 4
2005	AFC Cup	Group D	(Hong Kong) Sun Hei	1–1	1–1	1st out of 4
2005	AFC Cup	Group D	(Maldives) Club Valencia	1–0	4–0	1st out of 4
2005	AFC Cup	Quarter-finals	(Jordan) Al-Faisaly	0–1	0–1	0–2
2005	ASEAN Club Championship	Group B	(Myanmar) Finance and Revenue	2–1		1st out of 4
2005	ASEAN Club Championship	Group B	Thailand Tobacco Monopoly	3–1		1st out of 4
2005	ASEAN Club Championship	Group B	(Brunei) DPMM	1–0		1st out of 4
2005	ASEAN Club Championship	Semi-finals	(Vietnam) Hoàng Anh Gia Lai	0–0 (a.e.t.) (5–3 p)		
2005	ASEAN Club Championship	Final	(Malaysia) Pahang	4–2		
2006	AFC Cup	Group F	(Malaysia) Selangor	3–2	0–1	1st out of 4
2006	AFC Cup	Group F	(Hong Kong) Happy Valley	3–1	4–0	1st out of 4
2006	AFC Cup	Group F	(Maldives) Hurriyya	3–1	4–0	1st out of 4
2006	AFC Cup	Quarter-finals	(Jordan) Al-Wahdat	0–1	0–4	0–5
2007	AFC Cup	Group F	(India) Mohun Bagan	2–0	0–0	1st out of 4
2007	AFC Cup	Group F	(Thailand) Osotsapa	2–1	0–3	1st out of 4
2007	AFC Cup	Group F	(Malaysia) Pahang	2–0	4–1	1st out of 4
2007	AFC Cup	Quarter-finals	(Jordan) Al-Faisaly	1–2	2–5	3–7
2011	AFC Cup	Group G	(Maldives) Victory	3–1	4–0	2nd out of 4
2011	AFC Cup	Group G	(Thailand) Muangthong United	1–1	0–4	2nd out of 4
2011	AFC Cup	Group G	(Vietnam) Hà Nội T&T	3–1	1–1	2nd out of 4
2011	AFC Cup	Round of 16	(Iraq) Arbil	—N/a	0–1 (a.e.t.)	—N/a
2012	AFC Cup	Group F	(Hong Kong) Kitchee	0–0	1–3	4th out of 4
2012	AFC Cup	Group F	(Vietnam) Sông Lam Nghệ An	0–0	0–3	4th out of 4
2012	AFC Cup	Group F	(Malaysia) Terrenganu	0–1	2–0	4th out of 4
2013	AFC Cup	Group H	(Vietnam) Sài Gòn Xuân Thành	2–3	2–2	4th out of 4
2013	AFC Cup	Group H	(Malaysia) Selangor	2–3	3–3	4th out of 4
2013	AFC Cup	Group H	(India) East Bengal	2–4	1–2	4th out of 4
2014	AFC Cup	Group H	(Hong Kong) Kitchee	0–5	0–4	4th out of 4
2014	AFC Cup	Group H	(Myanmar) Nay Pyi Taw	0–1	1–3	4th out of 4
2014	AFC Cup	Group H	(India) Pune	3–1	5–2	4th out of 4
2016	AFC Cup	Group E	(Bangladesh) Sheikh Jamal Dhanmondi	4–0	2–3	2nd out of 4
2016	AFC Cup	Group E	(Malaysia) Selangor	1–0	1–0	2nd out of 4
2016	AFC Cup	Group E	(Philippines) Ceres	1–1	1–2	2nd out of 4
2016	AFC Cup	Round of 16	(India) Mohun Bagan	—N/a	2–1 (a.e.t.)	—N/a
2016	AFC Cup	Quarter-finals	(India) Bengaluru	0–0	0–1	0–1
2017	AFC Cup	Group G	(Malaysia) FELDA United	2–1	3–1	3rd out of 4
2017	AFC Cup	Group G	(Philippines) Ceres–Negros	2–4	0–5	3rd out of 4
2017	AFC Cup	Group G	(Vietnam) Hà Nội	1–2	0–4	3rd out of 4
2018	AFC Cup	Group H	(Vietnam) Sông Lam Nghệ An	0–2	1–2	4th out of 4
2018	AFC Cup	Group H	(Indonesia) Persija Jakarta	2–4	1–4	4th out of 4
2018	AFC Cup	Group H	(Malaysia) Johor Darul Ta'zim	0–0	1–2	4th out of 4
2019	AFC Cup	Group F	(Myanmar) Yangon United	4–3	3–1	2nd out of 4
2019	AFC Cup	Group F	(Vietnam) Hà Nội	1–1	0–2	2nd out of 4
2019	AFC Cup	Group F	(Cambodia) Nagaworld	4–2	5–1	2nd out of 4
2021	AFC Champions League	Group H	(Japan) Gamba Osaka	0–2	1–8	4th out of 4
2021	AFC Champions League	Group H	(Thailand) Chiangrai United	0–3	0–1	4th out of 4
2021	AFC Champions League	Group H	(South Korea) Jeonbuk Hyundai Motors	0–4	0–9	4th out of 4
2022	AFC Cup	Group H	(Indonesia) PSM Makassar	1–3		3rd out of 3
2022	AFC Cup	Group H	(Malaysia) Kuala Lumpur City	1–2		3rd out of 3
2023–24	AFC Cup	Play-off round	(Cambodia) Phnom Penh Crown	2–3	—N/a	—N/a
2024–25	AFC Champions League Two	Group G	(Thailand) Bangkok United	1–0	2–4	3rd out of 4
2024–25	AFC Champions League Two	Group G	(Hong Kong) Lee Man	3–1	0–0	3rd out of 4
2024–25	AFC Champions League Two	Group G	(Vietnam) Nam Định	3–3	2–3	3rd out of 4
2025–26	AFC Champions League Two	Group H	(Philippines) Kaya–Iloilo	5–3	3–0	2nd out of 4
2025–26	AFC Champions League Two	Group H	(Thailand) BG Pathum United	2–1	2–0	2nd out of 4
2025–26	AFC Champions League Two	Group H	(South Korea) Pohang Steelers	1–0	1–1	2nd out of 4
2025–26	AFC Champions League Two	Round of 16	(Vietnam) Công An Hà Nội	3–1	3–0 FF (Note: Awarded result, after Công An Hà Nội fielded two ineligible players. The original score on the field was a 4–0 win to Công An Hà Nội.)	6–1
2025–26	AFC Champions League Two	Quarter-finals	(Thailand) Bangkok United	2–2	1–2	3–4
2025–26	ASEAN Club Championship	Group B	(Philippines) Dynamic Herb Cebu	—N/a	3–1	5th out of 6
2025–26	ASEAN Club Championship	Group B	(Malaysia) Selangor	—N/a	2–4	5th out of 6
2025–26	ASEAN Club Championship	Group B	(Thailand) BG Pathum United	3–1	—N/a	5th out of 6
2025–26	ASEAN Club Championship	Group B	(Thailand) Buriram United	1–4	—N/a	5th out of 6
2025–26	ASEAN Club Championship	Group B	(Vietnam) Công An Hà Nội	—N/a	1–6	5th out of 6
2026–27	AFC Champions League Two	Group G	(China) Shanghai Shenhua		1–2	
2026–27	AFC Champions League Two	Group G	(Japan) Machida Zelvia	0–1		
2026–27	AFC Champions League Two	Group G	(Cambodia) Preah Khan Reach Svay Rieng	1–5	0–2	
2026–27	ASEAN Club Championship	Group A	(Malaysia) Kuching City	—N/a	2–2	
2026–27	ASEAN Club Championship	Group A	(Thailand) Ratchaburi	3–2	—N/a	
2026–27	ASEAN Club Championship	Group A	(Vietnam) Công An Hồ Chí Minh City		—N/a	
2026–27	ASEAN Club Championship	Group A	(Philippines) Manila Digger		—N/a	
2026–27	ASEAN Club Championship	Group A	(Indonesia) Borneo	—N/a		
2026–27	ASEAN Club Championship	Group A	(Thailand) Buriram United	—N/a		
