= Sead Muratović =

Serbian footballer and manager

Personal information
- Full name: Sead Muratović
- Date of birth: 6 February 1979 (age 47)
- Place of birth: Novi Pazar, SFR Yugoslavia
- Height: 1.74 m (5 ft 8 1/2 in)
- Position: Central defender

Team information
- Current team: Novi Pazar U19 (Assistant Manager)

Youth career
- Novi Pazar

Senior career*
Years	Team	Apps	(Gls)
1997–1998	Mogren	20	(0)
1998–2000	Spartak Subotica	12	(1)
2000–2007	Tampines Rovers	213	(36)
2008	Club Valencia	24	(5)
2008–2009	Novi Pazar	32	(4)
Total		301	(46)

International career
1998	FR Yugoslavia U18		

Managerial career
- 2009: Novi Pazar (youth)
- 2018–2019: Balestier Khalsa (assistant)
- 2021–2024: Novi Pazar (youth)
- 2025: Josanica (assistant)
- 2025–: Novi Paza U19 (assistant)
- * Club domestic league appearances and goals

Sead Muratović (Serbian Cyrillic: Сеад Муратовић; born 6 February 1979) is a retired Serbian footballer. He is currently the manager of youth teams of FK Novi Pazar.

== Playing career ==
Born in Novi Pazar, Muratović played with FK Mogren before joining FK Spartak Subotica where he played from 1998 to 2000 in the First League of FR Yugoslavia. In 2000, he moved to Singapore and signed with Tampines Rovers in the S. League. He played with Tampines in the 2007 AFC Cup.

Muratović was headbutted by Michael Owen during an UEFA European Under-19 Championship match against England in 1997, resulting in the first red card of Owen's fledgling career.

Muratović retired from football in 2009 and begin his coaching career.
