= Yuki Kobayashi (footballer, born 1992) =

Japanese association football player (born 1992)

Yuki Kobayashi 小林 祐希
Personal information
- Full name: Yuki Kobayashi
- Date of birth: 24 April 1992 (age 34)
- Place of birth: Tokyo, Japan
- Height: 1.82 m (6 ft 0 in)
- Position: Midfielder

Team information
- Current team: Tampines Rovers
- Number: 49

Youth career
- JACPA Tokyo FC
- 2005–2010: Tokyo Verdy

Senior career*
Years	Team	Apps	(Gls)
2010–2012	Tokyo Verdy	62	(6)
2012–2013	→ Júbilo Iwata (loan)	11	(0)
2013–2016	Júbilo Iwata	101	(13)
2016–2019	SC Heerenveen	92	(3)
2019–2020	Beveren	21	(2)
2020–2021	Al Khor	16	(0)
2021	Seoul E-Land	8	(0)
2022	Gangwon FC	12	(0)
2022	Vissel Kobe	9	(3)
2023–2024	Hokkaido Consadole Sapporo	40	(3)
2025	Iwate Grulla Morioka	24	(5)
2026–	Tampines Rovers	0	(0)

International career^{‡}
2016–2019	Japan	8	(1)
- * Club domestic league appearances and goals as of 2 February 2025, 8:22 (UTC) ‡ National team caps and goals as of 9 June 2019

Yuki Kobayashi (小林 祐希, Kobayashi Yūki; born 24 April 1992) is a Japanese footballer who currently plays as a midfielder for Singapore Premier League club Tampines Rovers.

== Club career ==
=== SC Heerenveen ===
On 18 August 2016, Kobayashi joined Eredivisie side SC Heerenveen from Júbilo Iwata in the J1 League. He make his debut on 10 September in a 3–1 win over FC Twente. Kobayashi scored his first goal for the club on 3 December in a 3–1 win over Go Ahead Eagles.

On 12 May 2019, Kobayashi make his 100th appearances for the club in a 2–1 over NAC Breda.

=== Beveren ===
After Kobayashi contract was not renewed at SC Heerenveen, he moved on a free transfer to Belgium club Beveren on 6 September 2019.

=== Al Khor ===
In September 2020, Beveren announced that he would transfer to Qatari club Al-Khor.

In July 2021, Kobayashi joined Seoul E-Land of K League 2. He left the club at the end of the season through a mutual consent.

In February 2022, he joined Gangwon FC of K League 1.

In December 2022, Kobayashi returned to Japan and signed to J1 club, Hokkaido Consadole Sapporo from 2023 season.

On 1 February 2025, Kobayashi was announce official transfer to JFL relegated club, Iwate Grulla Morioka for 2025 season.

Kobayashi was announced by Tampines Rovers on 4 January 2026 for the rest of the 2025–26 Singapore Premier League season, donning the number 49 jersey.

== International career ==
Kobayashi made his first appearance for the Japan national football team in a friendly 1–2 loss to Bosnia and Herzegovina.

== Career statistics ==
=== Club ===
As of the start for 2025 season.

Club	Season	League			National cup		League cup		Continental		Other		Total	
Club	Season	Division	Apps	Goals	Apps	Goals	Apps	Goals	Apps	Goals	Apps	Goals	Apps	Goals
Tokyo Verdy	2010	J.League Div 2	4	0	1	0	-		-		5	0		
Tokyo Verdy	2011	J.League Div 2	34	2	2	1	-		-		-		36	3
Tokyo Verdy	2012	J.League Div 2	24	4	0	0	-		-		-		24	4
Tokyo Verdy	Total		62	6	3	1	0	0	0	0	0	0	65	7
Júbilo Iwata	2012	J.League Div 1	11	0	3	1	0	0	-		-		14	1
Júbilo Iwata	2013	J.League Div 1	1	0	0	0	1	0	-		-		2	0
Júbilo Iwata	2014	J.League Div 2	36	2	3	0	-		-		-		39	2
Júbilo Iwata	2015	J2 League	40	6	0	0	-		-		-		40	6
Júbilo Iwata	2016	J1 League	24	5	1	0	-		-		-		25	5
Júbilo Iwata	Total		112	13	7	1	1	0	0	0	0	0	120	14
SC Heerenveen	2016–17	Eredivisie	30	1	4	0	-		-		-		34	1
SC Heerenveen	2017–18	Eredivisie	30	1	1	0	-		-		-		31	1
SC Heerenveen	2018–19	Eredivisie	29	0	3	0	-		-		-		32	0
SC Heerenveen	Total		89	2	8	0	0	0	0	0	0	0	97	2
Waasland-Beveren	2019–20	Belgian First Division A	20	2	1	0	-		-		-		21	2
Waasland-Beveren	2020–21	Belgian First Division A	1	0	0	0	-		-		-		1	0
Waasland-Beveren	Total		21	2	1	0	0	0	0	0	0	0	22	2
Al-Khor	2020–21	Qatar Stars League	16	0	1	0	4	2	-		1	1	22	3
Seoul E-Land	2021	K League 2	8	0	0	0	-		-		-		8	0
Gangwon FC	2022	K League 1	12	0	2	0	-		-		-		14	0
Vissel Kobe	2022	J1 League	9	3	1	0	2	0	1	0	-		13	3
Hokkaido Consadole Sapporo	2023	J1 League	21	3	2	0	3	0	–				26	3
Hokkaido Consadole Sapporo	2024	J1 League	19	0	2	0	6	0	–				27	0
Hokkaido Consadole Sapporo	Total		40	3	4	0	9	0	–				53	3
Iwate Grulla Morioka	2025	Japan Football League	0	0	0	0	0	0	0	0	-		0	0
Iwate Grulla Morioka	Total		0	0	0	0	0	0	0	0	0	0	0	0
Tampines Rovers FC	2025–26	Singapore Premier League	0	0	0	0	0	0	0	0	0	0	0	0
Tampines Rovers FC	Total		0	0	0	0	0	0	0	0	0	0	0	0
Career total			371	29	27	2	16	2	1	0	1	1	416	34

=== International ===
Japan national team
Year	Apps	Goals
2016	2	1
2017	2	0
2018	0	0
2019	4	0
Total	8	1

=== International goals ===
Scores and results list Japan's goal tally first.

No	Date	Venue	Opponent	Score	Result	Competition
1.	11 November 2016	Kashima Soccer Stadium, Kashima, Japan	Oman	4–0	4–0	Friendly
