= Syazwan Buhari =

Singaporean footballer

Personal information
- Full name: Muhammad Syazwan bin Buhari
- Date of birth: 22 September 1992 (age 34)
- Place of birth: Singapore
- Height: 1.73 m (5 ft 8 in)
- Position: Goalkeeper

Team information
- Current team: Tampines Rovers
- Number: 24

Youth career
- National Football Academy

Senior career*
| Years | Team | Apps | (Gls) |
| 2010–2015 | Garena Young Lions | 79 | (0) |
| 2016–2017 | Geylang International | 26 | (0) |
| 2018– | Tampines Rovers | 155 | (0) |

International career^{‡}
| 2015 | Singapore U23 | 6 | (0) |
| 2023– | Singapore | 3 | (0) |
Medal record
Men's football
Representing Singapore
SEA Games
| Bronze medal – third place | SEA Games 2013 | Football |
- * Club domestic league appearances and goals as of 5 November 2016 ‡ National team caps and goals as of 26 March 2023

Muhammad Syazwan bin Buhari (born 22 September 1992), better known as Syazwan Buhari, is a Singaporean professional footballer who plays as a goalkeeper for Singapore Premier League club Tampines Rovers, whom he captains and the Singapore national team.

== Club career ==
=== Young Lions ===
Syazwan began his professional football career with Garena Young Lions in the S. League in 2010.

=== Geylang International ===
In 2016, Syazwan signed for Geylang International and was the first choice goalkeeper for the club.

=== Tampines Rovers ===
Following the conclusion of the 2017 S.League season, it was announced that Syazwan had signed for local giants Tampines Rovers on a 2-year contract. He is expected to take the place of departing No. 1 Izwan Mahbud, who had sealed a move to Thai League 2 side Nongbua Pitchaya.

Syazwan won his first trophy in the 2019 Singapore Cup when he played through the game with a dislocated finger.

On 7 July 2021 during matchday 5 of the 2021 AFC Champions League group stage match. He won the 'Man of the Match' award for his outstanding performance against Japanese club, Gamba Osaka and also notably saves 2 penalties in 1 game.

On 23 February 2025, Syazwan played his 200th game for Tampines Rovers in a 1–0 win against DPMM.

== International career ==
=== Youth ===
Syazwan was called up to the national Under-23 team for the 2015 Southeast Asian Games and was the first choice goalkeeper.

=== Senior ===
Syazwan spend most of his time being the third choice goalkeeper for Singapore.

His impressive performance in the 2016 S.League earned him a call-up to the senior squad for the first time in a friendly match against Malaysia on 10 July 2016 by Singapore's head coach V. Sundramoorthy, but did not play.

After 29 international games being on the bench, Syazwan made his international debut against Macau at the Macau Olympic Complex Stadium playing the full match and keeping a clean sheet on 26 March 2023.

On 18 June 2023, Syazwan made his second international cap against Solomon Islands at the Singapore National Stadium.

=== Others ===
==== Singapore Selection Squad ====
He was selected as part of the Singapore Selection squad for The Sultan of Selangor's Cup held on 24 August 2019.

== Personal life ==
Syazwan's elder brother, Syarqawi Buhari, is a FIFA-certified referee who has officiated in the S.League for a number of years.

== Career statistics ==
=== Club ===
As of 6 July 2022.

| Club | Season | League | | | Singapore Cup | | League Cup | | Continental | | Total | |
| Club | Season | Division | Apps | Goals | Apps | Goals | Apps | Goals | Apps | Goals | Apps | Goals |
|---|---|---|---|---|---|---|---|---|---|---|---|---|
| Young Lions FC | 2010 | S.League | 1 | 0 | 0 | 0 | 1 | 0 | 0 | 0 | 2 | 0 |
| Young Lions FC | 2011 | S.League | 1 | 0 | 0 | 0 | 0 | 0 | 0 | 0 | 1 | 0 |
| Young Lions FC | 2012 | S.League | 21 | 0 | 0 | 0 | 4 | 0 | 0 | 0 | 25 | 0 |
| Young Lions FC | 2013 | S.League | 15 | 0 | 1 | 0 | 3 | 0 | 0 | 0 | 19 | 0 |
| Young Lions FC | 2014 | S.League | 19 | 0 | 0 | 0 | 0 | 0 | 0 | 0 | 19 | 0 |
| Young Lions FC | 2015 | S.League | 22 | 0 | 0 | 0 | 0 | 0 | 0 | 0 | 22 | 0 |
| Young Lions FC | Total | | 79 | 0 | 1 | 0 | 8 | 0 | 0 | 0 | 88 | 0 |
| Geylang International | 2016 | S.League | 24 | 0 | 3 | 0 | 0 | 0 | 0 | 0 | 27 | 0 |
| Geylang International | 2017 | S.League | 23 | 0 | 1 | 0 | 4 | 0 | 0 | 0 | 28 | 0 |
| Geylang International | Total | | 47 | 0 | 4 | 0 | 4 | 0 | 0 | 0 | 55 | 0 |
| Tampines Rovers | 2018 | Singapore Premier League | 24 | 0 | 2 | 0 | 0 | 0 | 7 | 0 | 33 | 0 |
| Tampines Rovers | 2019 | Singapore Premier League | 22 | 0 | 0 | 0 | 0 | 0 | 6 | 0 | 28 | 0 |
| Tampines Rovers | 2020 | Singapore Premier League | 14 | 0 | 0 | 0 | 1 | 0 | 3 | 0 | 18 | 0 |
| Tampines Rovers | 2021 | Singapore Premier League | 17 | 0 | 0 | 0 | 0 | 0 | 5 | 0 | 22 | 0 |
| Tampines Rovers | 2022 | Singapore Premier League | 28 | 0 | 6 | 0 | 0 | 0 | 2 | 0 | 36 | 0 |
| Tampines Rovers | 2023 | Singapore Premier League | 21 | 0 | 7 | 0 | 0 | 0 | 1 | 0 | 29 | 0 |
| Tampines Rovers | 2024–25 | Singapore Premier League | 19 | 0 | 0 | 0 | 0 | 0 | 6 | 0 | 25 | 0 |
| Tampines Rovers | Total | | 145 | 0 | 15 | 0 | 1 | 0 | 30 | 0 | 191 | 0 |
| Career total | | | 270 | 0 | 20 | 0 | 13 | 0 | 30 | 0 | 333 | 0 |

=== International caps ===
| No | Date | Venue | Opponent | Result | Competition |
|---|---|---|---|---|---|
| 1 | 26 March 2023 | Macau Olympic Complex Stadium, Macau | Macau | 1–0 | Friendly |
| 2 | 18 June 2023 | National Stadium, Kallang, Singapore | Solomon Islands | 1–1 | Friendly |

== Honours ==
=== Club ===
Tampines Rovers

- Singapore Cup: 2019
- Singapore Community Shield: 2020, 2025

=== Individual ===
- Singapore Premier League Team of the Year: 2020, 2023
- Singapore Premier League Golden Glove: 2023
