= 2022 Young Lions FC season =

Young Lions
2022 season
- Chairman: Farehan Hussein
- Head coach: Nazri Nasir
- Stadium: Jurong West Stadium
Home colours	Away colours

The 2022 season was Young Lions' 19th consecutive season in the top flight of Singapore football and in the S.League.

== Key events ==
1. Danish Irfan and Jordan Emaviwe were injured during the AFF u23 tournament and will miss significant time out. Danish partially torn his ACL and meniscus while Jordan had a broken jaw.

== Squad ==
=== Singapore Premier League ===
As of 26 Sept 2019.

Squad No.	Name	Nationality	Date of birth (age)	Last club	Contract start	Contract end
Goalkeepers
1	Umayr Sujuandy	(Singapore)	18 February 2003 (age 23)	(Singapore) Lion City Sailors	2021	2021
18	Ridhwan Fikri	(Singapore)	29 April 1999 (age 27)	(Singapore) GFA Victoria FC	2020	2022
25	Dylan Pereira	(Singapore)	31 July 2000 (age 26)	(Singapore) Geylang International	2021	2022
32	Putra Anugerah	(Singapore) (Indonesia)	2 April 2000 (age 26)	(Singapore) Lion City Sailors FC U21	2020	2022
35	Rauf Erwan	(Singapore)	25 April 2005 (age 21)	Singapore Sports School	2022	2022
38	Martyn Mun	(Singapore)	7 January 2000 (age 26)	(Singapore) Balestier Khalsa U21	2022	2022
40	Wayne Chew	(Singapore)	22 October 2001 (age 24)	(Singapore) Geylang International	2022	2022
Defenders
2	Raoul Suhaimi	(Singapore)	18 September 2005 (age 21)	Singapore Sports School	2021	2022
3	Jordan Emaviwe	(Singapore) (Nigeria)	9 April 2001 (age 25)	(Singapore) Balestier Khalsa	2021	2022
5	Syabil Hisham	(Singapore)	20 September 2002 (age 24)	(Singapore) Tanjong Pagar United	2021	2021
6	Jacob Mahler	(Singapore) (Denmark)	20 April 2000 (age 26)	(Singapore) FFA Under-18	2018	2022
23	Harhys Stewart	(Singapore) (Wales)	20 March 2001 (age 25)	(Singapore) Hougang United U21	2020	2022
26	Danial Crichton	(Singapore) (Scotland) (Canada)	11 April 2003 (age 23)	(Singapore) Warriors FC U21	2020	2022
28	Syed Akmal	(Singapore)	28 April 2000 (age 26)	(Singapore) FFA Under-18	2019	2022
29	Harith Kanadi	(Singapore)	1 August 2000 (age 26)	(Singapore) Geylang International	2022	2022
37	Moritz Faizal Radewaldt	(Singapore) (Germany)	4 March 2004 (age 22)	(Singapore)	2022	2022
Midfielders
8	Shah Shahiran	(Singapore)	14 November 1999 (age 26)	(Singapore) Tampines Rovers	2021	2022
15	Amir Syafiz	(Singapore)	21 June 2004 (age 22)	Singapore Sports School	2021	2022
20	Nor Hakim Redzuan	(Singapore)	21 October 2000 (age 25)	(Singapore) Hougang United U21	2020	2022
22	Danish Qayyum	(Singapore)	2 February 2002 (age 24)	(Singapore) Geylang International U21	2021	2022
30	Jared Gallagher	(Singapore) (Republic of Ireland)	18 January 2002 (age 24)	(Hong Kong) Kitchee SC Reserve	2021	2022
33	Fairuz Fazli Koh	(Singapore)	20 January 2005 (age 21)	Singapore Sport School	2022	2022
34	Ryu Hardy Yussri	(Singapore)	20 April 2005 (age 21)	Singapore Sport School	2022	2022
36	Elijah Lim Teck Yong	(Singapore)	8 May 2001 (age 25)	(Singapore) Geylang International	2022	2022
39	Justin Hui	(Singapore)	17 February 1998 (age 28)	(Singapore) Lion City Sailors FC	2022	2022
41	Syed Adel Alsree	(Singapore)	12 July 2002 (age 24)	(Singapore)	2022	2022
Forwards
9	Zikos Vasileios Chua	(Singapore) (Greece)	15 April 2002 (age 24)	(Singapore) Geylang International	2022	2022
10	Glenn Kweh	(Singapore)	26 March 2000 (age 26)	(Singapore) FFA Under-15	2021	2022
11	Rasaq Akeem	(Singapore) (Nigeria)	16 June 2001 (age 25)	(Singapore) FFA Under-17	2019	2022
19	Khairin Nadim	(Singapore)	8 May 2004 (age 22)	(Singapore) Woodlands Secondary School	2020	2022
31	Irfan Iskandar	(Singapore)	16 August 2004 (age 22)	Singapore Sports School	2022	2022
Players who left during the season
4	Danish Irfan (Captain)	(Singapore)	10 March 1999 (age 27)	(Singapore) Geylang International	2020	2022
7	Daniel Goh	(Singapore)	13 August 1999 (age 27)	(Japan) Albirex Niigata (S)	2021	2022
12	Joel Chew	(Singapore)	9 February 2000 (age 26)	(Singapore) Tampines Rovers	2021	2022
13	Syahrul Sazali	(Singapore)	3 June 1998 (age 28)	(Singapore) Tampines Rovers	2021	2022
14	Rezza Rezky	(Singapore)	8 November 2000 (age 25)	(Singapore) FFA Under-18	2019	2022
16	Ryhan Stewart	(Singapore) (Wales)	15 February 2000 (age 26)	(Singapore) Warriors FC	2020	2022
17	Ilhan Fandi	(Singapore) (South Africa)	8 November 2002 (age 23)	(England) i2i Football Academy	2019	2022
21	Zulqarnaen Suzliman	(Singapore)	29 March 1998 (age 28)	(Singapore) Lion City Sailors FC	2021	2022
24	Zamani Zamri	(Singapore)	31 May 2001 (age 25)	(Japan) Albirex Niigata (S)	2020	2022
27	Arshad Shamim	(Singapore)	9 December 1999 (age 26)	(Singapore) Lion City Sailors FC	2018	2022

== Coaching staff ==
Position	Name
Team Manager	(Singapore) Tan Qing Hui Samuel
Head team coach	(Singapore) Nazri Nasir
Assistant coach	(Japan) Koichiro Iizuka
Goalkeeping coach	(Singapore) Ahmadulhaq Che Omar
Physiotherapist	Vacant
Sports Trainers	(Singapore) Nasruldin Baharudin (Singapore) Muklis Sawit
Equipment Officer	(Singapore) Omar Mohamed

== Transfer ==
=== In ===
Pre-Season

Position	Player	Transferred From	Ref
GK	(Singapore) Umayr Sujuandy	Singapore Sports School	Free
GK	(Singapore) Rauf Erwan	Singapore Sports School	Free
MF	(Singapore) Fairuz Fazli Koh	Singapore Sports School	Free
MF	(Singapore) Ryu Hardy Yussri	Singapore Sports School	Free
FW	(Singapore) Irfan Iskandar	Singapore Sports School	Free

=== Out ===
Pre-Season

Position	Player	Transferred To	Ref
DF	(Singapore) Nazhiim Harman	(Singapore) Hougang United	Free
DF	(Singapore) Alif Iskandar	(Singapore)	Free
MF	(Singapore) Daniel Goh	(Singapore) Balestier Khalsa	Free
FW	(Singapore) (South Africa) Ilhan Fandi	(Japan) Albirex Niigata (S)	Free

Note 1: Daniel Goh will join Balestier Khalsa after completing his NS stint in April 2022.

Note 2: Ilhan Fandi will join Albirex Niigata after completing his NS stint in April 2022.

Mid-Season

Position	Player	Transferred To	Ref
DF	(Singapore) (Wales) Ryhan Stewart	(Thailand) Chiangmai F.C.	Free

=== Loan in ===
Pre-Season

Position	Player	Transferred From	Ref
GK	(Singapore) Dylan Pereira	(Singapore) Geylang International U21	Season loan
DF	(Singapore) Syed Akmal	(Singapore) SAFSA	Season loan
DF	(Singapore) Harith Kanadi	(Singapore) SAFSA	Season loan
DF	(Singapore) (Wales) Harhys Stewart	(Singapore) Hougang United U21	Season loan
DF	(Singapore) (Canada) Danial Crichton	(Singapore) SAFSA	NS till 2023
DF	(Singapore) (Denmark) Jacob Mahler	(Singapore) SAFSA	Season loan
MF	(Singapore) Joel Chew	(Singapore) SAFSA	Season loan
MF	(Singapore) Daniel Goh	(Singapore) SAFSA	Season loan
MF	(Singapore) Arshad Shamim	(Singapore) SAFSA	Season loan
MF	(Singapore) (Nigeria) Jordan Emaviwe	(Singapore) SAFSA	Season loan
MF	(Singapore) (Nigeria) Rasaq Akeem	(Singapore) SAFSA	Season loan
MF	(Singapore) Nor Hakim Redzuan	(Singapore) Hougang United U21	Season loan
MF	(Singapore) Shah Shahiran	(Singapore) SAFSA	Season loan
FW	(Singapore) Zamani Zamri	(Singapore) SAFSA	Till April 2022
FW	(Singapore) (Greece) Zikos Vasileios Chua	(Singapore) SAFSA	Season loan

Note 1: Harhys Stewart returns on loan for another season.

Mid-Season

Position	Player	Transferred From	Ref
GK	(Singapore) Putra Anugerah	(Singapore) Young Lions FC	Season loan
MF	(Singapore) Elijah Lim Teck Yong	(Singapore) SAFSA	Free
GK	(Singapore) Martyn Mun	(Singapore) SAFSA	Season loan
GK	(Singapore) Wayne Chew	(Singapore) SAFSA	Season loan

=== Loan out ===
Pre-Season

Position	Player	Transferred To	Ref
DF	(Singapore) (Canada) Danial Crichton	(Singapore) Police SA	NS till 2023
DF	(Singapore) Sahffee Jubpre	(Singapore) SAFSA	NS till 2023
DF	(Singapore) Syed Akmal	(Singapore) SAFSA	NS till 2023
MF	(Singapore) (Nigeria) Rasaq Akeem	(Singapore) SAFSA	NS till 2023

=== Loan return ===
Pre-Season

Position	Player	Transferred To	Ref
GK	(Singapore) Martyn Mun	(Singapore) Balestier Khalsa	Loan Return
GK	(Singapore) Dylan Pereira	(Singapore) Geylang International U21	Loan Return
DF	(Singapore) Danish Irfan	(Singapore) Geylang International	Loan Return
DF	(Singapore) (Wales) Harhys Stewart	(Singapore) Hougang United U21	Loan Return
DF	(Singapore) Sahffee Jubpre	(Singapore) Hougang United U21	Loan Return
DF	(Singapore) Syahrul Sazali	(Singapore) SAFSA	Loan Return
DF	(Singapore) Zulqarnaen Suzliman	(Singapore) Police SA	Loan Return
MF	(Singapore) (Denmark) Jacob Mahler	(Singapore) SAFSA	Loan Return
MF	(Singapore) (Mali) Bill Mamadou	(Singapore) Lion City Sailors U21	Loan Return
MF	(Singapore) Joel Chew	(Singapore) SAFSA	Loan Return
MF	(Singapore) Daniel Goh	(Singapore) SAFSA	Loan Return
MF	(Singapore) Hami Syahin	(Singapore) Police SA	Loan Return
MF	(Singapore) Nor Hakim Redzuan	(Singapore) Hougang United U21	Loan Return
MF	(Singapore) Arshad Shamim	(Singapore) SAFSA	Loan Return
MF	(Singapore) (Nigeria) Jordan Emaviwe	(Singapore) SAFSA	Loan Return
MF	(Singapore) Shah Shahiran	(Singapore) SAFSA	Loan Return
FW	(Singapore) Zamani Zamri	(Japan) Albirex Niigata (S)	Loan Return

Note 1: Danish Irfan will subsequently move to Tampines Rovers after his contract with Geylang International ended at his end of NS stint. He will stay with the club till he completes his NS in April/May 2022.''

Note 2: Hami Syahin returned to Lion City Sailors after completing his NS.

Note 3: Zulqarnaen Suzliman will continue with GYL and return to Lion City Sailors after completing his NS.

Note 4: Syahrul Sazali, Joel Chew, Shah Shahiran will continue with GYL and return to Tampines Rovers after completing their NS.

Note 5: Zamani Zamri will continue with GYL until and return to Albirex Niigata (S) after completing his NS in April 2022.

Note 6: Dylan Pereira and Hakim Redzuan loan to the GYL were extended for another season.

Mid-Season

Position	Player	Transferred To	Ref
MF	(Singapore) Joel Chew	(Singapore) Tampines Rovers	NS till 2022
DF	(Singapore) Syahrul Sazali	(Singapore) Tampines Rovers	NS till 2022
MF	(Singapore) Arshad Shamim	(Singapore) SAFSA	NS till 2022

=== Retained ===
Position	Player	Ref
GK	(Singapore) Ridhwan Fikri	
DF	(Singapore) (Wales) Ryhan Stewart	
DF	(Singapore) Raoul Suhaimi	
DF	(Singapore) Syabil Hisham	
MF	(Singapore) Rezza Rezky	
MF	(Singapore) (Republic of Ireland) Jared Gallagher	
MF	(Singapore) Amir Syafiz	
MF	(Singapore) Danish Qayyum	
FW	(Singapore) Khairin Nadim	
FW	(Singapore) Glenn Kweh	

== Friendly ==
=== Pre-season friendly ===
Win Draw Loss

22 January 2022 1	Geylang International (Singapore)	1–0	(Singapore) Young Lions FC	Tampines
	Azri Suhaili			Stadium: Our Tampines Hub

29 January 2022 2	Tanjong Pagar United (Singapore)	1–3	(Singapore) Young Lions FC	Jurong East
	Goal		Jacob Mahler (pen.); Daniel Goh	Stadium: Jurong East Stadium

=== In-season friendly ===
Win Draw Loss

14 May 2022 1	Young Lions FC (Singapore)	4–1	Singapore Football Club	Geylang
			Yash Sharma	Stadium: Geylang Field

== Team statistics ==
=== Appearances and goals ===
As of 5 Nov 2022

Numbers in parentheses denote appearances as substitute.

No.	Pos.	Player	Sleague		Singapore Cup		U21 League		Total (Exclude U21)	
No.	Pos.	Player	Apps.	Goals	Apps.	Goals	Apps.	Goals	Apps.	Goals
1	GK	(Singapore) Umayr Sujuandy	0	0	0	0	2	0	0	0
2	DF	(Singapore) Raoul Suhaimi	10+4	0	1	0	5	0	15	0
3	DF	(Singapore) (Nigeria) Jordan Emaviwe	17+3	4	0+1	1	4	0	21	5
5	DF	(Singapore) Syabil Hisham	9+5	0	0	0	3	0	14	0
6	DF	(Singapore) (Denmark) Jacob Mahler	7	0	0	0	0	0	7	0
8	MF	(Singapore) Shah Shahiran	20+3	1	2	0	1	0	25	1
9	FW	(Singapore) (Greece) Zikos Vasileios Chua	12+7	8	0	0	3	0	19	8
10	FW	(Singapore) Glenn Kweh	19+7	3	1	0	2	0	27	3
11	FW	(Singapore) (Nigeria) Rasaq Akeem	12+4	4	2+1	1	4	0	19	5
13	DF	(Singapore) Syahrul Sazali	14+2	0	2+1	0	3	0	19	0
15	MF	(Singapore) Amir Syafiz	9+3	0	2	0	5	0	14	0
18	GK	(Singapore) Ridhwan Fikri	22	0	3	0	0	0	25	0
19	FW	(Singapore) Khairin Nadim	11+7	1	0+1	0	7	5	19	1
20	MF	(Singapore) Nor Hakim Redzuan	7+4	0	0+1	0	1	0	12	0
22	MF	(Singapore) Danish Qayyum	15+5	2	3	0	4	0	23	2
23	DF	(Singapore) (Wales) Harhys Stewart	16+1	1	3	0	3	0	20	1
25	GK	(Singapore) Dylan Pereira	6	0	0	0	1	0	6	0
26	DF	(Singapore) (Scotland) Danial Scott Crichton	8+2	0	3	0	3	0	13	0
28	DF	(Singapore) Syed Akmal	17+3	1	3	0	4	0	23	1
29	DF	(Singapore) Harith Kanadi	7+8	0	1+1	0	6	0	17	0
30	MF	(Singapore) (Republic of Ireland) Jared Gallagher	20+4	0	2+1	0	6	0	27	0
31	MF	(Singapore) Irfan Iskandar	1+4	0	1	0	6	6	6	0
33	MF	(Singapore) Fairuz Fazli Koh	2+2	0	0+1	0	4	0	5	0
34	MF	(Singapore) Ryu Hardy Yussri	4+3	0	3	0	6	0	10	0
35	GK	(Singapore) Rauf Erwan	0	0	0	0	4	0	0	0
36	MF	(Singapore) Elijah Lim Teck Yong	8+5	1	1+2	0	4	0	16	1
37	DF	(Singapore) (Germany) Moritz Faizal Radewaldt	0+3	0	0	0	8	0	3	0
38	GK	(Singapore) Martyn Mun	0	0	0	0	2	0	0	0
39	MF	(Singapore) Justin Hui	0	0	0	0	1	0	0	0
40	GK	(Singapore) Wayne Chew	0	0	0	0	1	0	0	0
41	MF	(Singapore) Syed Adel	0+2	0	0	0	2	0	2	0
Players who have played this season and/or sign for the season but had left the club or on loan to other club
4	DF	(Singapore) Danish Irfan	0	0	0	0	0	0	0	0
7	FW	(Singapore) Daniel Goh	1+1	0	0	0	0	0	2	0
12	MF	(Singapore) Joel Chew	16+5	0	0	0	1	0	21	0
14	MF	(Singapore) Rezza Rezky	1+4	0	0	0	0	0	5	0
16	DF	(Singapore) (Wales) Ryhan Stewart	5	3	0	0	0	0	5	3
17	FW	(Singapore) (South Africa) Ilhan Fandi	1+2	2	0	0	0	0	3	2
21	DF	(Singapore) Zulqarnaen Suzliman	3	2	0	0	0	0	3	2
24	FW	(Singapore) Zamani Zamri	0+1	0	0	0	0	0	1	0
27	MF	(Singapore) Arshad Shamim	8+10	0	0+2	0	4	0	24	0

== Competitions ==
=== Singapore Premier League ===
Win Draw Loss

12 March 2022 1	Young Lions FC (Singapore)	0–5	(Japan) Albirex Niigata (S)	Jalan Besar
	Jacob Mahler (penalty missed) 54; Joel Chew (yellow card) 17'; Zulqarnaen Suzliman (yellow card) 37'	Report	Kodai Tanaka 34' 36'; Masahiro Sugita 82'; Fairoz Hassan 87'; Kan Kobayashi 90+2' (pen.); Nikesh Singh (yellow card) 44'; Tatsuya Sambongi (yellow card) 52'	Stadium: Jalan Besar Stadium; Referee: Ahmad A'qashah

19 March 2022 2	Balestier Khalsa (Singapore)	4–3	(Singapore) Young Lions FC	Toa Payoh
	Ryoya Tanigushi 41'; Kuraba Kondo 44' 62'; Shuhei Hoshino 85'	Report	Zikos Vasileios Chua 16'; Zulqarnaen Suzliman 53'; Ilhan Fandi 89'	Stadium: Toa Payoh Stadium; Referee: Taufik Thana

2 April 2022 3	Young Lions FC (Singapore)	2–3	(Singapore) Tanjong Pagar United	Jalan Besar
	Zulqarnaen Suzliman 3'; Ilhan Fandi 30' (pen.); Syahrul Sazali (yellow card) 34'	Report	Khairul Amri 9' (yellow card) 85'; Faritz Hameed 41' (yellow card) 72'; Faizal Raffi 67'; Raihan Rahman (yellow card) 31'; Blake Ricciuto (yellow card) 82'	Stadium: Jalan Besar Stadium; Referee: Hilmi Fuad

6 April 2022 4	Young Lions FC (Singapore)	0–1	(Singapore) Lion City Sailors	Jalan Besar
	Shah Shahiran (yellow card) 63'	Report	Gabriel Quak 15'	Stadium: Jalan Besar Stadium; Referee: Andrea Verolino

10 April 2022 5	Hougang United (Singapore)	2–1	(Singapore) Young Lions FC	Hougang
	Zulfahmi Arifin 38'; Sahil Suhaimi 52'; André Alipin (yellow card) 60' (red card) 67'; Nazhiim Harman (yellow card) 73'; Pedro Bortoluzo (yellow card) 81'; Nazrul Nazari (yellow card) 89'	Report	Ryhan Stewart 41'; Danish Qayyum (yellow card) 87'	Stadium: Hougang Stadium; Referee: Clarence Hong Wei Leow

16 April 2022 6	Young Lions FC (Singapore)	4–1	(Singapore) Geylang International	Jalan Besar
	Zikos Vasileios Chua 7'; Ryhan Stewart 21' 58' (yellow card) 22'; Qayyum Raishyan 83' (o.g.); Shah Shahiran (yellow card) 66'; Jacob Mahler (yellow card) 72'	Report	Šime Žužul 71' (pen.); Huzaifah Aziz (yellow card) 61'	Stadium: Jalan Besar Stadium; Referee: Abirami Naidu

20 April 2022 7	Tampines Rovers (Singapore)	3–2	(Singapore) Young Lions FC	Tampines
	Boris Kopitović 56' 90+2'; Shuya Yamashita 82'; Zehrudin Mehmedović (yellow card) 24'; Taufik Suparno (yellow card) 48'; Irfan Najeeb (yellow card) 64'; Yasir Hanapi (yellow card) 90+3'	Report	Zikos Vasileios Chua 1'; Jordan Emaviwe 22'; Jared Gallagher (yellow card) 44'; Harith Kanadi (yellow card) 64'; Amir Syafiz (yellow card) 86'; Arshad Shamim (yellow card) 90+1'	Stadium: Our Tampines Hub; Referee: Hilmi Fuad

21 June 2022 8 (Rescheduled)	Geylang International (Singapore)	2–2	(Singapore) Young Lions FC	Tampines
	Takahiro Tezuka 16'; Hazzuwan Halim 46'; Joshua Pereira (yellow card) 75'; Faizal Roslan (yellow card) 85'; Umar Ramle (yellow card) 85'; Ahmad Syahir (yellow card) 90'	Report	Danish Qayyum 80' (yellow card) 85'; Syed Akmal 90+1' (yellow card) 15'; Harith Kanadi (yellow card) 58'; Rasaq Akeem (yellow card) 90+2'	Stadium: Our Tampines Hub; Referee: Hilmi Fuad

24 August 2022 9 (Rescheduled)	Young Lions FC (Singapore)	0–1	(Singapore) Tampines Rovers	Jalan Besar
	Syed Akmal (yellow card) 86'	Report	Taufik Suparno 13' (yellow card) 82'	Stadium: Jalan Besar Stadium; Referee: Ahmad A'qashah

10 August 2022 10 (Rescheduled)	Albirex Niigata (S) (Japan)	7–1	(Singapore) Young Lions FC	Jurong East
	Kodai Tanaka 21' 31' 65'; Masahiro Sugita 23'; Ilhan Fandi 34'; Harhys Stewart 59' (o.g.); Kumpei Kakuta 88' (yellow card) 57'	Report	Reo Kunimoto 90+1' (o.g.); Shah Shahiran (yellow card) 55'; Jared Gallagher (yellow card) 83'; Amir Syafiz (yellow card) 83'	Stadium: Jurong East Stadium; Referee: Abirami Naidu

18 June 2022 11	Tanjong Pagar United (Singapore)	2–0	(Singapore) Young Lions FC	Jurong East
	Reo Nishiguchi 40'; Faritz Hameed 49'	Report	Jared Gallagher (yellow card) 83'	Stadium: Jurong East Stadium; Referee: Abirami Naidu

25 June 2022 12	Young Lions FC (Singapore)	0–1	(Singapore) Balestier Khalsa	Jalan Besar
	Danish Qayyum (red card) 36'; Syed Akmal (yellow card) 73'	Report	Ryoya Tanigushi 69'; Ensar Brunčević (yellow card) 29'; Shuhei Hoshino (yellow card) 36'; Darren Teh (yellow card) 60'; Akmal Azman (yellow card) 70'; Hairul Syirhan (yellow card) 90'	Stadium: Jalan Besar Stadium; Referee: Ahmad A'qashah

29 June 2022 13	Lion City Sailors (Singapore)	5–1	(Singapore) Young Lions FC	Jalan Besar
	Song Ui-young 11'; Shahdan Sulaiman 14'; Hafiz Nor 45'; Kim Shin-wook 56' (pen.); Maxime Lestienne 66'; Anumanthan Kumar (yellow card) 89'	Report	Glenn Kweh 78'	Stadium: Jalan Besar Stadium; Referee: Clarence Leow Hong Wei

5 July 2022 14 (Rescheduled)	Young Lions FC (Singapore)	0–4	(Singapore) Hougang United	Jalan Besar
	Jared Gallagher (yellow card) 69'	Report	Anders Aplin 37'; Sahil Suhaimi 70'; Amy Recha 74'; Shawal Anuar 80'; Muhaimin Suhaimi (yellow card) 52'; Lionel Tan (yellow card) 82'	Stadium: Jalan Besar Stadium; Referee: Taufik Thana

8 July 2022 15	Young Lions FC (Singapore)	0–2	(Singapore) Geylang International	Jalan Besar
	Shah Shahiran (yellow card) 72'	Report	Šime Žužul 72' (pen.); Tajeli Salamat 90'; Rio Sakuma (yellow card) 7'; Tajeli Salamat (yellow card) 84'	Stadium: Jalan Besar Stadium; Referee: Farhad Mohamed

17 July 2022 16	Tampines Rovers (Singapore)	5–2	(Singapore) Young Lions FC	Tampines
	Boris Kopitović 11' (yellow card) 85'; Taufik Suparno 15' 78' (yellow card) 51'; Zehrudin Mehmedović 44'; Yasir Hanapi 58'; Irfan Najeeb (yellow card) 8'; Ryaan Sanizal (yellow card) 79'; Ethan Henry Pinto (yellow card) 82'	Report	Rasaq Akeem 35'; Zikos Vasileios Chua 70' (yellow card) 87'; Elijah Lim Teck Yong (yellow card) 68'; Jordan Emaviwe (yellow card) 90'	Stadium: Our Tampines Hub; Referee: Abirami Naidu

23 July 2022 17	Young Lions FC (Singapore)	0–5	(Japan) Albirex Niigata (S)	Jalan Besar
	Jared Gallagher (yellow card) 34'; Nor Hakim Redzuan (yellow card) 44'; Arshad Shamim (yellow card) 34'	Report	Ilhan Fandi 24'; Masahiro Sugita 29'; Kodai Tanaka 64' 73'; Syahrul Sazali 85' (o.g.); Kumpei Kakuta (yellow card) 37'; Zamani Zamri (yellow card) 41'; Keito Hariya (yellow card) 42'; Tsubasa Kawanishi (yellow card) 67'; Reo Kunimoto (yellow card) 74'; Masaya Idetsu (yellow card) 84'	Stadium: Jalan Besar Stadium; Referee: Farhad Mohamed

31 July 2022 18	Balestier Khalsa (Singapore)	2–0	(Singapore) Young Lions FC	Toa Payoh
	Shuhei Hoshino 45' (yellow card) 23'; Kuraba Kondo 75' (pen.); Hairul Syirhan (yellow card) 39'; Ho Wai Loon (yellow card) 73'; Akmal Bin Azman (yellow card) 90'	Report	Harith Kanadi (yellow card) 65'	Stadium: Toa Payoh Stadium; Referee: Ahmad A'qashah

7 August 2022 19	Young Lions FC (Singapore)	4–2	(Singapore) Tanjong Pagar United	Jalan Besar
	Zikos Vasileios Chua 22' 30' 45' 52' (yellow card) 90+2'	Report	Khairul Amri 38'; Reo Nishiguchi 70'; Akram Amzal (red card) 19'; Khairul Nizam (yellow card) 52'; Emmeric Ong (yellow card) 90+2'	Stadium: Jalan Besar Stadium; Referee: Jansen Foo

13 August 2022 20	Young Lions FC (Singapore)	1–10	(Singapore) Lion City Sailors	Jalan Besar
	Rasaq Akeem 16'; Arshad Shamim (yellow card) 65'	Report	Maxime Lestienne 7' 34'; Gabriel Quak 12' 33'; Kim Shin-wook 15' 50' 62'; Song Ui-young 74' 81'; Hami Syahin 85'; Nur Adam Abdullah (yellow card) 26'	Stadium: Jalan Besar Stadium; Referee: Shadiq Al-Hussain

20 August 2022 21	Hougang United (Singapore)	5–1	(Singapore) Young Lions FC	Hougang
	Shawal Anuar 22'; Kristijan Krajcek 32'; Amy Recha 38'; Shahril Ishak 59'; Farhan Zulkifli 90+2'; Shahfiq Ghani (yellow card) 54'; Anders Aplin (yellow card) 81'	Report	Rasaq Akeem 29'; Jordan Emaviwe (yellow card) 13'; Jared Gallagher (yellow card) 34'	Stadium: Hougang Stadium; Referee: Jansen Foo

27 August 2022 22	Geylang International (Singapore)	3–0	(Singapore) Young Lions FC	Tampines
	Joshua Pereira 32'; Šime Žužul 46' 61'	Report		Stadium: Our Tampines Hub; Referee: Hilmi Fuad

3 September 2022 23	Young Lions FC (Singapore)	0–7	(Singapore) Tampines Rovers	Jalan Besar
	Syed Akmal (yellow card) 87'	Report	Kyoga Nakamura 24'; Yasir Hanapi 48'; Zehrudin Mehmedović 55'; Boris Kopitović 63' 67'; Taufik Suparno 65'; Amir Mirza 82'	Stadium: Jalan Besar Stadium; Referee: Taufik Thana

10 September 2022 24	Albirex Niigata (S) (Japan)	2–1	(Singapore) Young Lions FC	Jurong East
	Tadanari Lee 20' 69'	Report	Harhys Stewart 12'	Stadium: Jurong East Stadium; Referee: Farhad Mohamed

21 October 2022 25 (Rescheduled)	Lion City Sailors (Singapore)	2–1	(Singapore) Young Lions FC	Jalan Besar
	Faris Ramli 48' 67'; Adam Swandi (yellow card) 45'; Saifullah Akbar (yellow card) 82'	Report	Jordan Emaviwe 85' (pen.); Jared Gallagher (yellow card) 79'	Stadium: Jalan Besar Stadium; Referee: Ahmad A'qashah

1 October 2022 26	Tanjong Pagar United (Singapore)	8–1	(Singapore) Young Lions FC	Jurong East
	Reo Nishiguchi 3' (pen.) 8' (pen.) 53' (pen.) 79' 82'; Khairul Amri 45'; Blake Ricciuto 50' (yellow card) 44'; Khairul Nizam 70'; Rusyaidi Salime (yellow card) 65'	Report	Rasaq Akeem 66' (pen.); Fairuz Fazli Koh (yellow card) 2'	Stadium: Jurong East Stadium; Referee: Hilmi Fuad

8 October 2022 27	Young Lions FC (Singapore)	4–4	(Singapore) Balestier Khalsa	Jalan Besar
	Khairin Nadim 23'; Shah Shahiran 58' (pen.); Elijah Lim Teck Yong 73'; Jordan Emaviwe 90+5' (pen.); Harith Kanadi (yellow card) 50'; Harhys Stewart (yellow card) 90'	Report	Daniel Goh 4'; Shuhei Hoshino 6'; Ryoya Tanigushi 15'; Kuraba Kondo 41'; Ho Wai Loon (yellow card) 66'	Stadium: Jalan Besar Stadium; Referee: Abirami Naidu

15 October 2022 28	Young Lions FC (Singapore)	3–5	(Singapore) Hougang United	Jalan Besar
	Glenn Kweh 16'; Danish Qayyum 72'; Jordan Emaviwe 89'	Report	Fabian Kwok 2'; Pedro Bortoluzo 32' 60' 79'; Amy Recha 90'	Stadium: Jalan Besar Stadium; Referee: Taufiq Thana

Pos	Team	Pld	W	D	L	GF	GA	GD	Pts	Qualification or relegation
4	Geylang International	28	10	9	9	48	46	+2	39	
5	Hougang United	28	10	9	9	65	71	−6	39	Qualification for AFC Cup group stage (Cup Winner)
6	Tanjong Pagar United	28	10	7	11	59	69	−10	37	
7	Balestier Khalsa	28	7	3	18	45	78	−33	24	
8	Young Lions (Note: The foreign club – Albirex Niigata (S) – as well as the Football Association of Singapore (FAS) under-21 team, Young Lions, are ineligible for any AFC competition spots.)	28	2	2	24	34	103	−69	8	

Source: Singapore Premier League
Rules for classification: 1) points; 2) goal difference; 3) number of goals scored; 4) number of wins

=== Singapore Cup ===
Pos	Team	Pld	W	D	L	GF	GA	GD	Pts	Qualification
1	Albirex Niigata (S) (Q)	3	3	0	0	7	1	+6	9	Semi-finals
2	Balestier Khalsa (Q)	3	1	1	1	8	6	+2	4	Semi-finals
3	Lion City Sailors	3	0	2	1	5	6	−1	2	
4	Young Lions FC	3	0	1	2	3	10	−7	1	

Updated to match(es) played on 25 September 2019. Source: FAS
(Q) Qualified for the phase indicated

==== Group ====
27 October 2022 Match 1	Albirex Niigata (S) (Japan)	4–0	(Singapore) Young Lions	Jurong East
	Kodai Tanaka 5' 36'; Masaya Idetsu 21'; Masahiro Sugita 74'; Nicky Melvin Singh (yellow card) 33'; Kumpei Kakuta (yellow card) 72'	Report	Raoul Suhaimi (red card) 19'; Ryu Hardy (yellow card) 24'; Harith Kanadi (yellow card) 65'; Arshad Shamim (yellow card) 77'; Harhys Stewart (yellow card) 83'; Shah Shahiran (yellow card) 85'	Stadium: Jurong East Stadium; Referee: Farhad Mohamed

31 October 2022 Match 2	Young Lions (Singapore)	1–1	(Singapore) Lion City Sailors	Jalan Besar
	Izwan Mahbud 45' (o.g.); Syahrul Sazali (yellow card) 51'; Shah Shahiran (yellow card) 57'; Syed Akmal (yellow card) 88'; Fairuz Fazli Koh (yellow card) 90+2'	Report	Saifullah Akbar (yellow card) 19'; Kim Shin-wook 74' (yellow card) 57'; Maxime Lestienne (yellow card) 71'	Stadium: Jalan Besar Stadium; Referee: Taufik Thana

5 November 2022 Match 3	Balestier Khalsa (Singapore)	5–2	(Singapore) Young Lions	Toa Payoh
	Daniel Goh 9'; Kuraba Kondo 11' 30'; Shuhei Hoshino 21'; Ryoya Tanigushi 38' (yellow card) 88'	Report	Rasaq Akeem 41'; Jordan Emaviwe 48'; Jared Gallagher (yellow card) 45'	Stadium: Toa Payoh Stadium; Referee: Andrea Verolino
