= 2021 Young Lions FC season =

Young Lions
2021 season
- Chairman: Farehan Hussein
- Head coach: Nazri Nasir
- Stadium: Jurong West Stadium
| Home colours | Away colours |

The 2021 season was Young Lions' 18th consecutive season in the top flight of Singapore football and in the S.League.

== Squad ==
=== Singapore Premier League ===
As of 26 Sept 2019.

| Squad No. | Name | Nationality | Date of birth (age) | Last club | Contract start | Contract end |
Goalkeepers
| 18 | Ridhwan Fikri | (Singapore) | 29 April 1999 (age 27) | (Singapore) GFA Victoria FC | 2020 | 2021 |
| 25 | Dylan Pereira | (Singapore) | 31 July 2000 (age 26) | (Singapore) Geylang International U21 | 2021 | 2021 |
| 32 | Putra Anugerah | (Singapore) (Indonesia) | 2 April 2000 (age 26) | (Singapore) Lion City Sailors FC U21 | 2020 | 2021 |
| 40 | Martyn Mun | (Singapore) | 7 January 2000 (age 26) | (Singapore) Balestier Khalsa U21 | 2021 | 2021 |
Defenders
| 2 | Nazhiim Harman | (Singapore) | 2 March 1999 (age 27) | (Singapore) GFA Victoria FC | 2020 | 2020 |
| 4 | Danish Irfan (Captain) | (Singapore) | 10 March 1999 (age 27) | (Singapore) Geylang International | 2020 | 2021 |
| 5 | Syabil Hisham | (Singapore) | 20 September 2002 (age 24) | (Singapore) Tanjong Pagar United | 2021 | 2021 |
| 6 | Jacob Mahler | (Singapore) (Denmark) | 20 April 2000 (age 26) | (Singapore) FFA Under-18 | 2018 | 2021 |
| 7 | Zulqarnaen Suzliman | (Singapore) | 29 March 1998 (age 28) | (Singapore) Lion City Sailors FC | 2021 | 2021 |
| 13 | Syahrul Sazali | (Singapore) | 3 June 1998 (age 28) | (Singapore) Tampines Rovers | 2021 | 2021 |
| 16 | Ryhan Stewart | (Singapore) (Wales) | 15 February 2000 (age 26) | (Singapore) Warriors FC | 2020 | 2021 |
| 23 | Harhys Stewart | (Singapore) (Wales) | 20 March 2001 (age 25) | (Singapore) Hougang United U21 | 2020 | 2021 |
| 26 | Alif Iskandar | (Singapore) | 16 January 1999 (age 27) | (Singapore) Hougang United | 2021 | 2021 |
| 29 | Raoul Suhaimi | (Singapore) | 18 September 2005 (age 21) | Singapore Sports School | 2021 | 2021 |
Midfielders
| 8 | Rezza Rezky | (Singapore) | 8 November 2000 (age 26) | (Singapore) FFA Under-18 | 2019 | 2021 |
| 9 | Shah Shahiran | (Singapore) | 14 November 1999 (age 27) | (Singapore) Tampines Rovers | 2021 | 2021 |
| 10 | Daniel Goh | (Singapore) | 13 August 1999 (age 27) | (Singapore) Albirex Niigata (S) | 2021 | 2021 |
| 11 | Rasaq Akeem | (Singapore) (Nigeria) | 16 June 2001 (age 25) | (Singapore) FFA Under-17 | 2019 | 2021 |
| 12 | Joel Chew | (Singapore) | 9 February 2000 (age 26) | (Singapore) Tampines Rovers | 2021 | 2021 |
| 14 | Hami Syahin | (Singapore) | 16 December 1998 (age 27) | (Singapore) Lion City Sailors FC | 2020 | 2021 |
| 15 | Amir Syafiz | (Singapore) | 21 June 2004 (age 22) | Singapore Sports School | 2021 | 2021 |
| 20 | Nor Hakim Redzuan | (Singapore) | 21 October 2000 (age 26) | (Singapore) Hougang United U21 | 2020 | 2021 |
| 22 | Danish Qayyum | (Singapore) | 2 February 2002 (age 24) | (Singapore) Geylang International U21 | 2021 | 2021 |
| 27 | Arshad Shamim | (Singapore) | 9 December 1999 (age 26) | (Singapore) Lion City Sailors FC | 2018 | 2021 |
| 30 | Jared Gallagher | (Singapore) (Republic of Ireland) | 18 January 2002 (age 24) | (Hong Kong) Kitchee SC Reserve | 2021 | 2021 |
| 31 | Bill Mamadou | (Singapore) (Mali) | 8 September 2001 (age 25) | (Singapore) Lion City Sailors FC U21 | 2020 | 2021 |
| 42 | Jordan Emaviwe ^{U23} | (Singapore) (Nigeria) | 9 April 2001 (age 25) | (Singapore) Balestier Khalsa | 2021 | 2021 |
Forwards
| 17 | Ilhan Fandi | (Singapore) (South Africa) | 8 November 2002 (age 24) | (England) i2i Football Academy | 2019 | 2021 |
| 19 | Khairin Nadim | (Singapore) | 8 May 2004 (age 22) | (Singapore) Woodlands Secondary School | 2020 | 2021 |
| 24 | Zamani Zamri | (Singapore) | 31 May 2001 (age 25) | (Singapore) Albirex Niigata (S) | 2020 | 2021 |
| 39 | Glenn Kweh | (Singapore) | 26 March 2000 (age 26) | | 2021 | 2021 |
Players who left during the season
| 1 | Nurshafiq Zaini | (Singapore) | 26 March 1999 (age 27) | (Singapore) Tampines Rovers U21 | 2020 | 2021 |
| 3 | Danial Crichton | (Singapore) (Canada) | 11 April 2003 (age 23) | (Singapore) Warriors FC U21 | 2020 | 2021 |
| 21 | Sahffee Jubpre | (Singapore) | 31 March 2001 (age 25) | (Singapore) Hougang United U21 | 2020 | 2021 |
| 28 | Syed Akmal | (Singapore) | 28 April 2000 (age 26) | (Singapore) FFA Under-18 | 2019 | 2021 |

== Coaching staff ==
| Position | Name |
|---|---|
| Team Manager | (Singapore) Tan Qing Hui Samuel |
| Head team coach | (Singapore) Nazri Nasir |
| Assistant coach | (Japan) Koichiro Iizuka |
| Assistant coach | (Singapore) Fadzuhasny Juraimi |
| Goalkeeping coach | (Singapore) Rameshpal Singh |
| Physiotherapist | Vacant |
| Sports Trainers | (Singapore) Nasruldin Baharudin (Singapore) Muklis Sawit |
| Equipment Officer | (Singapore) Omar Mohamed |

== Transfer ==
=== In ===
Pre-Season

| Position | Player | Transferred From | Ref |
|---|---|---|---|
| DF | (Singapore) Syabil Hisham | (Singapore) Tanjong Pagar United | Free |
| MF | (Singapore) Amir Syafiz | Singapore Sports School | Free |
| MF | (Singapore) Danish Qayyum | (Singapore) Geylang International U21 | Free |
| DF | (Singapore) Alif Iskandar | (Singapore) Hougang United | Free |
| DF | (Singapore) Raoul Suhaimi | Singapore Sports School | Free |
| FW | (Singapore) Glenn Kweh | | Free |

Mid-Season

| Position | Player | Transferred From | Ref |
|---|---|---|---|
| MF | (Singapore) (Republic of Ireland) Jared Gallagher | (Hong Kong) Kitchee SC Reserve | Free |

=== Out ===
Pre-Season

| Position | Player | Transferred To | Ref |
|---|---|---|---|
| GK | (Singapore) (Hong Kong) (India) Veer Karan Sobti | (Singapore) Lion City Sailors | Free |
| DF | (Singapore) Nur Adam Abdullah | (Singapore) Lion City Sailors | Free |
| DF | (Singapore) Amer Hakeem | (Singapore) Balestier Khalsa | Free |
| DF | (Singapore) Shahib Masnawi | (Singapore) Tanjong Pagar United | Free |
| DF | (Singapore) Akram Azman | (Singapore) | |
| MF | (Singapore) Amirul Haikal | (Singapore) Tampines Rovers | Free |
| FW | (Singapore) Marc Ryan Tan | (Singapore) Tampines Rovers | Free |
| FW | (Singapore) Shahrulnizam Mazlan | (Singapore) | Free |

=== Loan in ===
Pre-Season

| Position | Player | Transferred From | Ref |
|---|---|---|---|
| GK | (Singapore) Dylan Pereira | (Singapore) Geylang International U21 | Season loan |
| GK | (Singapore) Nurshafiq Zaini | (Singapore) Tampines Rovers U21 | Season loan |
| DF | (Singapore) Danish Irfan | (Singapore) Geylang International | Season loan |
| DF | (Singapore) (Wales) Harhys Stewart | (Singapore) Hougang United U21 | Season loan |
| DF | (Singapore) Sahffee Jubpre | (Singapore) Hougang United U21 | Season loan |
| DF | (Singapore) Syahrul Sazali | (Singapore) SAFSA | Season loan |
| DF | (Singapore) Zulqarnaen Suzliman | (Singapore) Police SA | Season loan |
| MF | (Singapore) (Denmark) Jacob Mahler | (Singapore) SAFSA | Season loan |
| MF | (Singapore) (Mali) Bill Mamadou | (Singapore) Lion City Sailors U21 | Season loan |
| MF | (Singapore) Joel Chew | (Singapore) SAFSA | Season loan |
| MF | (Singapore) Daniel Goh | (Singapore) SAFSA | Season loan |
| MF | (Singapore) Hami Syahin | (Singapore) Police SA | Season loan |
| MF | (Singapore) Nor Hakim Redzuan | (Singapore) Hougang United U21 | Season loan |
| FW | (Singapore) Zamani Zamri | (Singapore) Albirex Niigata (S) | Season loan |

Mid-Season

| Position | Player | Transferred From | Ref |
|---|---|---|---|
| GK | (Singapore) Martyn Mun | (Singapore) Balestier Khalsa | Season loan |
| DF | (Singapore) (Denmark) Jacob Mahler | (Singapore) SAFSA | Season loan |
| MF | (Singapore) Arshad Shamim | (Singapore) SAFSA | Season loan |
| MF | (Singapore) (Nigeria) Jordan Emaviwe | (Singapore) SAFSA | Season loan |
| MF | (Singapore) Shah Shahiran | (Singapore) SAFSA | Season loan |

=== Loan out ===
Pre-Season

| Position | Player | Transferred To | Ref |
|---|---|---|---|
| MF | (Singapore) (Denmark) Jacob Mahler | (Singapore) SAFSA | NS till 2022 |

Jacob Mahler subsequently return to the club during the mid-season after his BMT.

Mid-Season

| Position | Player | Transferred To | Ref |
|---|---|---|---|
| DF | (Singapore) (Canada) Danial Crichton | (Singapore) SAFSA | NS till 2023 |
| DF | (Singapore) Sahffee Jubpre | (Singapore) Hougang United | NS till 2023 |
| DF | (Singapore) Syed Akmal | (Singapore) SAFSA | NS till 2023 |
| MF | (Singapore) (Nigeria) Rasaq Akeem | (Singapore) SAFSA | NS till 2023 |

Sahffee Jubpre was enlisted during the mid-season.

=== Loan return ===
Pre-Season

| Position | Player | Transferred To | Ref |
|---|---|---|---|
| GK | (Singapore) (Indonesia) Putra Anugerah | (Singapore) Lion City Sailors U21 | Loan Return |
| GK | (Singapore) Nurshafiq Zaini | (Singapore) Tampines Rovers U21 | Loan Return |
| DF | (Singapore) Irfan Najeeb | (Singapore) Tampines Rovers | Loan Return |
| DF | (Singapore) Danish Irfan | (Singapore) Geylang International | Loan Return |
| DF | (Singapore) Asraf Zahid | (Singapore) Hougang United U21 | Loan Return |
| DF | (Singapore) Sahffee Jubpre | (Singapore) Hougang United U21 | Loan Return |
| DF | (Singapore) (Wales) Harhys Stewart | (Singapore) Hougang United U21 | Loan Return |
| DF | (Singapore) Akmal Azman | (Singapore) SAFSA | Loan Return |
| MF | (Singapore) Nor Hakim Redzuan | (Singapore) Hougang United U21 | Loan Return |
| MF | (Singapore) Hami Syahin | (Singapore) Police SA | Loan Return |
| MF | (Singapore) Zamani Zamri | (Singapore) SAFSA | Loan Return |
| MF | (Singapore) (Mali) Bill Mamadou | (Singapore) Lion City Sailors U21 | Loan Return |
| FW | (Singapore) Fikri Junaidi | (Singapore) Geylang International U21 | Loan Return |
| FW | (Singapore) Idraki Adnan | (Singapore) Hougang United | Loan Return |

Note 1: Danish Irfan loan from Geylang International is extended for one more season.

Note 2: Putra Anugerah and Bill Mamadou loan from Lion City Sailors is extended for one more season.

Note 3: Sahffee Jubpre and Harhys Stewart loan from Geylang International is extended for one more season.

Note 4: Hami Syahin loan from Police SA is extended for one more season.

Note 5: Nurshafiq Zaini loan from Tampines Rovers is extended for one more season.

Mid-Season

| Position | Player | Transferred To | Ref |
|---|---|---|---|
| GK | (Singapore) Nurshafiq Zaini | (Singapore) Tampines Rovers | Loan return |

Nurshafiq Zaini returned and retired with immediate effect.

=== Retained ===
| Position | Player | Ref |
|---|---|---|
| GK | (Singapore) Ridhwan Fikri | |
| DF | (Singapore) Nazhiim Harman | |
| DF | (Singapore) Syed Akmal | |
| DF | (Singapore) (Wales) Ryhan Stewart | |
| DF | (Singapore) (Canada) Danial Crichton | |
| MF | (Singapore) Rezza Rezky | |
| MF | (Singapore) (Nigeria) Rasaq Akeem | |
| FW | (Singapore) Khairin Nadim | |
| FW | (Singapore) (South Africa) Ilhan Fandi | |

== Friendly ==
=== Pre-season friendly ===
Win Draw Loss

| 6 March 2021 1 | Young Lions FC (Singapore) | 1–3 | (Singapore) Lion City Sailors | Jalan Besar Stadium |
| | Danish Qayyum | | | Attendance: 0 (Note: Due to Covid 19, this match is played behind closed door.) |

=== In-season friendlies ===
Win Draw Loss

| 19 March 2021 1 | Geylang International (Singapore) | v | (Singapore) Young Lions FC | Our Tampines Hub |
| | | | | Attendance: 0 |

| 19 June 2021 2 | Geylang International (Singapore) | 4–0 | (Singapore) Young Lions FC | Jalan Besar Stadium |
| | | | | Attendance: 0 |

| 4 July 2021 3 | Hougang United (Singapore) | 1–1 | (Singapore) Young Lions FC | Jalan Besar Stadium |
| | Goal | | Harhys Stewart | Attendance: 0 |

== Team statistics ==
=== Appearances and goals ===
As of 10 Oct 2021

Numbers in parentheses denote appearances as substitute.

| No. | Pos. | Player | Sleague | | Total | |
| No. | Pos. | Player | Apps. | Goals | Apps. | Goals |
|---|---|---|---|---|---|---|
| 2 | DF | (Singapore) Nazhiim Harman | 4+1 | 0 | 5 | 0 |
| 4 | DF | (Singapore) Danish Irfan | 7+2 | 0 | 9 | 0 |
| 5 | DF | (Singapore) Syabil Hisham | 1+1 | 0 | 2 | 0 |
| 6 | DF | (Singapore) (Denmark) Jacob Mahler | 11+1 | 3 | 14 | 3 |
| 7 | DF | (Singapore) Zulqarnaen Suzliman | 11+2 | 0 | 13 | 0 |
| 8 | MF | (Singapore) Rezza Rezky | 6+3 | 0 | 9 | 0 |
| 9 | MF | (Singapore) Shah Shahiran | 3 | 1 | 4 | 1 |
| 10 | FW | (Singapore) Daniel Goh | 6+3 | 1 | 9 | 1 |
| 11 | MF | (Singapore) (Nigeria) Rasaq Akeem | 0 | 0 | 0 | 0 |
| 12 | MF | (Singapore) Joel Chew | 18+1 | 1 | 19 | 1 |
| 13 | DF | (Singapore) Syahrul Sazali | 13+1 | 0 | 14 | 0 |
| 14 | MF | (Singapore) Hami Syahin | 12+1 | 4 | 13 | 4 |
| 15 | MF | (Singapore) Amir Syafiz | 6+7 | 0 | 13 | 0 |
| 16 | DF | (Singapore) (Wales) Ryhan Stewart | 20 | 0 | 20 | 0 |
| 17 | FW | (Singapore) (South Africa) Ilhan Fandi | 18 | 7 | 18 | 7 |
| 18 | GK | (Singapore) Ridhwan Fikri | 12 | 0 | 12 | 0 |
| 19 | FW | (Singapore) Khairin Nadim | 14+5 | 3 | 19 | 3 |
| 20 | MF | (Singapore) Nor Hakim Redzuan | 2+2 | 0 | 4 | 0 |
| 22 | MF | (Singapore) Danish Qayyum | 3+7 | 0 | 10 | 0 |
| 23 | DF | (Singapore) (Wales) Harhys Stewart | 17 | 2 | 17 | 2 |
| 24 | FW | (Singapore) Zamani Zamri | 13+1 | 1 | 14 | 1 |
| 25 | GK | (Singapore) Dylan Pereira | 3 | 0 | 3 | 0 |
| 26 | DF | (Singapore) Alif Iskandar | 1+4 | 0 | 5 | 0 |
| 27 | MF | (Singapore) Arshad Shamim | 1+5 | 0 | 6 | 0 |
| 29 | DF | (Singapore) Raoul Suhaimi | 5+1 | 0 | 6 | 0 |
| 30 | MF | (Singapore) (Republic of Ireland) Jared Gallagher | 0 | 0 | 0 | 0 |
| 31 | MF | (Singapore) (Mali) Bill Mamadou | 1+1 | 0 | 2 | 0 |
| 32 | GK | (Singapore) (Indonesia) Putra Anugerah | 0 | 0 | 0 | 0 |
| 39 | FW | (Singapore) Glenn Kweh | 3+7 | 2 | 10 | 2 |
| 42 | MF | (Singapore) (Nigeria) Jordan Emaviwe | 1+1 | 0 | 2 | 0 |
Players who have played this season and/or sign for the season but had left the club or on loan to other club
| 1 | GK | (Singapore) Nurshafiq Zaini | 6 | 0 | 6 | 0 |
| 3 | DF | (Singapore) (Canada) Danial Crichton | 0 | 0 | 0 | 0 |
| 21 | DF | (Singapore) Sahffee Jubpre | 1+3 | 0 | 4 | 0 |
| 28 | DF | (Singapore) Syed Akmal | 11 | 1 | 11 | 1 |

== Competitions ==
=== Singapore Premier League ===
Win Draw Loss

| 14 March 2021 1 | Young Lions FC (Singapore) | 3–3 | (Singapore) Balestier Khalsa | Jalan Besar Stadium |
| | Ilhan Fandi 13'; Khairin Nadim 58'; Hami Syahin 85'; Ryhan Stewart (yellow card) 83'; Harhys Stewart (yellow card) 87' | Report | Hazzuwan Halim 33' (pen.); Shuhei Hoshino 45+1' 49'; Gareth Low (yellow card) 82' | Attendance: 0 Referee: Ahmad A'qashah |

| 17 March 2021 2 | Young Lions FC (Singapore) | 0–3 | (Japan) Albirex Niigata (S) | Jalan Besar Stadium |
| | Syed Akmal (yellow card) 4'; Zamani Zamri (yellow card) 65' | Report | Ryoya Tanigushi 17'; Makoto Ito 51'; Kiyoshiro Tsuboi 79' (yellow card) 65' | Attendance: 0 Referee: Taufik Thana |

| 20 March 2021 3 | Geylang International (Singapore) | 1–1 | (Singapore) Young Lions FC | Our Tampines Hub |
| | Sylvano Comvalius 34'; Firdaus Kasman (yellow card) 58' | Report | Hami Syahin (yellow card) 24'; Khairin Nadim 61' (yellow card) 30'; Danish Irfan Azman (yellow card) 70' | Attendance: 0 Referee: Jansen Foo |

| 3 April 2021 4 | Young Lions FC (Singapore) | 1–3 | (Singapore) Lion City Sailors | Jalan Besar Stadium |
| | Ilhan Fandi 78'; Hami Syahin (yellow card) 45+2' | Report | Gabriel Quak 26' 62'; Stipe Plazibat 34'; Jorge Fellipe (yellow card) 17'; Amirul Adli (yellow card) 45+1' (yellow-red card) 75'; Nur Adam Abdullah (yellow card) 60' | Attendance: 0 Referee: Y.Sathyakumar |

| 7 April 2021 5 | Tampines Rovers (Singapore) | 7–0 | (Singapore) Young Lions FC | Our Tampines Hub |
| | Kyoga Nakamura 13' 69'; Boris Kopitović 21' 80' (pen.) 87'; Yasir Hanapi 45' 67'; Zehrudin Mehmedovic (yellow card) 81' | Report | | Attendance: 0 Referee: Nathan Chan |

| 10 April 2021 6 | Young Lions FC (Singapore) | 0–4 | (Singapore) Tanjong Pagar United | Jalan Besar Stadium |
| | Hami Syahin (yellow card) 24'; Amir Syafiz (yellow card) 73' | Report | Reo Nishiguchi 5'; Luiz Júnior 61' 63'; Blake Ricciuto 66'; Daniel Martens (yellow card) 31'; Emmeric Ong (yellow card) 36'; Suhairi Sabri (yellow card) 90+2' | Attendance: 0 Referee: Jansen Foo |

| 17 April 2021 7 | Hougang United (Singapore) | 1–1 | (Singapore) Young Lions FC | Hougang Stadium |
| | Tomoyuki Doi 90+1'; Anders Aplin (yellow card) 41'; Lionel Tan (yellow card) 88' | Report | Glenn Kweh 74'; Harhys Stewart (yellow card) 81' | Attendance: 0 Referee: Taufik Thana |

| 17 July 2021 8 (Rescheduled) | Tanjong Pagar United (Singapore) | 1–1 | (Japan) Young Lions FC | Jurong East Stadium |
| | Luiz Júnior 65' | Report | Hami Syahin 21' (pen.); Jacob Mahler (yellow card) 87'; Zulqarnaen Suzliman (yellow card) 90+3' | Attendance: 0 Referee: Ahmad A'qashah |

| 15 May 2021 9 | Albirex Niigata (S) (Japan) | 2–1 | (Singapore) Young Lions FC | Jurong East Stadium |
| | Nicky Melvin Singh 3'; Fumiya Suzuki 49' | Report | Joel Chew 19' | Attendance: 0 Referee: Y.Sathyakumar |

| 25 April 2021 10 (Rescheduled) | Young Lions FC (Singapore) | 2–4 | (Singapore) Geylang International | Our Tampines Hub |
| | Hami Syahin 14' (pen.); Syed Akmal 77'; Harhys Stewart (yellow card) 41'; Ryhan Stewart (yellow card) 41' | Report | Faizal Roslan 10'; Amy Recha 53'; Matheus Moresche 57' 90+1'; Harith Kanadi (yellow card) 61' | Attendance: 237; Referee: Abirami Naidu |

| 22 May 2021 11 | Lion City Sailors (Singapore) | 1–0 | (Singapore) Young Lions FC | Jalan Besar Stadium |
| | Shahdan Sulaiman 43' (yellow card) 54'; Aniq Raushan (yellow card) 68'; Saifullah Akbar (yellow card) 78'; Song Ui-young (red card) 84'; Stipe Plazibat (yellow card) 85' | Report | Hami Syahin (yellow card) 34'; Syahrul Sazali (red card) 42'; Khairin Nadim (yellow card) 87' | Attendance: 0 Referee: Syarqawi Buhari |

| 2 May 2021 12 (Rescheduled) | Young Lions FC (Singapore) | 0–4 | (Singapore) Tampines Rovers | Jalan Besar Stadium |
| | Harhys Stewart (yellow card) 35'; Hami Syahin (yellow card) 68'; Jacob Mahler (yellow card) 78'; Zulqarnaen Suzliman (yellow card) 85' | Report | Zehrudin Mehmedović 3'; Irwan Shah 19'; Kyoga Nakamura 43'; Taufik Suparno 80'; Ryaan Sanizal (yellow card) 60' | Referee: Ahmad A'qashah |

| 31 July 2021 13 (Rescheduled) | Balestier Khalsa (Singapore) | 2–3 | (Singapore) Young Lions FC | Toa Payoh Stadium |
| | Hazzuwan Halim 47'; Šime Žužul 89'; Kristijan Krajcek (yellow card) 34'; Zulqarnaen Suzliman (yellow card) 90+4' | Report | Hami Syahin 18' (pen.); Daniel Goh 35'; Harhys Stewart 85'; Nazhiim Harman (yellow card) 5' | Referee: Jansen Foo |

| 7 August 2021 14 (Rescheduled) | Young Lions FC (Singapore) | 0–1 | (Singapore) Hougang United | Jalan Besar Stadium |
| | Hami Syahin (yellow card) 20' (yellow-red card) 71'; Arshad Shamim (yellow card) 72' | Report | Tomoyuki Doi 77' | Referee: Nathan Chan |

| 14 August 2021 15 (Rescheduled) | Young Lions FC (Singapore) | 4–2 | (Singapore) Balestier Khalsa | Jalan Besar Stadium |
| | Ilhan Fandi 18' 45+1'; Jacob Mahler 28'; Khairin Nadim 41'; Ryhan Stewart (yellow card) 77'; Alif Iskandar (yellow card) 90' | Report | Šime Žužul 68' 75'; Fadli Kamis (yellow card) 11'; Hazzuwan Halim (yellow card) 42'; Ahmad Syahir (yellow card) 45' | Referee: Syarqawi Buhari |

| 22 August 2021 16 (Rescheduled) | Young Lions FC (Singapore) | 0–1 | (Japan) Albirex Niigata (S) | Jalan Besar Stadium |
| | Rezza Rezky (yellow card) 38'; Jacob Mahler (yellow card) 52' | Report | Ryosuke Nagasawa 3' (pen.); Ong Yu En (yellow card) 45'; Shuya Yamashita (yellow card) 59' | Referee: Abirami Naidu |

| 28 August 2021 17 (Rescheduled) | Geylang International (Singapore) | 2–3 | (Singapore) Young Lions FC | Our Tampines Hub |
| | Amy Recha 7'; Matheus Moresche 56'; Wayne Chew (yellow card) 3'; Harith Kanadi (yellow card) 52' | Report | Jacob Mahler 3' (pen.); Ilhan Fandi 84' 90+4'; Rezza Rezky (yellow card) 41'; Zulqarnaen Suzliman (yellow card) 85' | Referee: Hilmi Fuad |

| 12 September 2021 18 (Rescheduled) | Young Lions FC (Singapore) | 1–3 | (Singapore) Lion City Sailors | Jalan Besar Stadium |
| | Ilhan Fandi 17'; Zulqarnaen Suzliman (yellow card) 42'; Raoul Suhaimi (yellow card) 58' (yellow-red card) 68'; Harhys Stewart (yellow card) 73'; Syahrul Sazali (yellow card) 80'; Philippe Aw (red card) 90+2'; Jordan Emaviwe (yellow card) 90+1' | Report | Jorge Fellipe 50' 85' (yellow card) 85'; Gabriel Quak 90+1'; Saifullah Akbar (yellow card) 47'; Faris Ramli (yellow card) 90+4' | Referee: Nathan Chan |

| 18 September 2021 19 (Rescheduled) | Tampines Rovers (Singapore) | 2–1 | (Singapore) Young Lions FC | Our Tampines Hub |
| | Daniel Goh 34' (o.g.); Taufik Suparno 71'; Baihakki Khaizan (yellow card) 15'; Amirul Haikal (yellow card) 29'; Madhu Mohana (yellow card) 69'; Yasir Hanapi (yellow card) 90' | Report | Jacob Mahler 70' (pen.); Shah Shahiran (yellow card) 82' | Referee: Abirami Naidu |

| 26 September 2021 20 (Rescheduled) | Young Lions FC (Singapore) | 1–2 | (Singapore) Tanjong Pagar United | Jalan Besar Stadium |
| | Glenn Kweh 23'; Joel Chew (yellow card) 45+1'; Ridhwan Fikri (yellow card) 45+1'; Syahrul Sazali (yellow card) 67'; Ryhan Stewart (yellow card) 85' | Report | Reo Nishiguchi 5'; Luiz Júnior 67' (pen.); Rusyaidi Salime (yellow card) 45+1'; Raihan Rahman (yellow card) 45+1' | Referee: Leow Hong Wei Clarence |

| 10 October 2021 21 (Rescheduled) | Hougang United (Singapore) | 1–3 | (Singapore) Young Lions FC | Hougang Stadium |
| | Fabian Kwok 73' (yellow card) 77'; Kishon Philip (yellow card) 45' | Report | Harhys Stewart 15'; Shah Shahiran 32'; Zamani Zamri 55' (yellow card) 80' | Referee: Taufil Thana |

| Pos | Team | Pld | W | D | L | GF | GA | GD | Pts | Qualification or relegation |
|---|---|---|---|---|---|---|---|---|---|---|
| 4 | Tampines Rovers | 21 | 7 | 6 | 8 | 48 | 51 | −3 | 27 | Qualification for AFC Cup group stage |
| 5 | Tanjong Pagar United | 21 | 5 | 7 | 9 | 36 | 49 | −13 | 22 | |
| 6 | Geylang International | 21 | 6 | 2 | 13 | 33 | 52 | −19 | 20 | |
| 7 | Balestier Khalsa | 21 | 5 | 4 | 12 | 34 | 52 | −18 | 19 | |
| 8 | Young Lions (Note: The foreign club – Albirex Niigata (S) – as well as the Football Association of Singapore (FAS) under-21 team, Young Lions, are ineligible for any AFC competition spots.) | 21 | 4 | 4 | 13 | 26 | 50 | −24 | 16 | |

Updated to match(es) played on 3 April 2021. Source: Singapore Premier League
Rules for classification: 1) points; 2) goal difference; 3) number of goals scored; 4) number of wins
