= Ryhan Stewart =

Singaporean footballer (born 2000)

Personal information
- Full name: Ryhan Euan Griffin Stewart
- Date of birth: 15 February 2000 (age 26)
- Place of birth: Singapore
- Height: 1.84 m (6 ft 0 in)
- Position: Right-back

Team information
- Current team: Lion City Sailors
- Number: 18

Youth career
- 2015: Warriors
- 2016: Home United
- 2017–2018: Tampines Rovers

Senior career*
Years	Team	Apps	(Gls)
2018	Tampines Rovers	0	(0)
2019	Warriors	22	(0)
2020–2022	Young Lions	35	(5)
2022–2023	Chiangmai	23	(1)
2023–2024	BG Pathum United	15	(0)
2024–2025	Albirex Niigata (S)	10	(1)
2025	Riteriai	11	(1)
2025–2026	Kanchanaburi Power	25	(2)
2026–	Lion City Sailors	3	(0)

International career^{‡}
2019–2022	Singapore U23	15	(0)
2022–	Singapore	42	(0)
Medal record
Men's football
Representing Singapore
Merlion Cup
Winner	2019 Singapore
- * Club domestic league appearances and goals as of 1 November 2026 ‡ National team caps and goals as of 1 October 2026

Ryhan Euan Griffin Stewart (born 15 February 2000) is a Singaporean professional footballer who plays as a right-back for Singapore Premier League club Lion City Sailors and the Singapore national team.

== Club career ==
=== Youth ===
Aside from playing for the Hong Kah Secondary School football team, Ryhan set out to find himself a club in the Singapore Premier League, or the S.League, as it was then known back then. He landed his first stint with a local club at Warriors, playing for their U-15 side, before moving to Home United U17 setup in 2016. However, just a year later, he received an offer from Tampines Rovers to join their Prime League team as a 17 year old, competing in the U-21 league being the youngest member of the team. In 2018, Ryhan was signed to the senior team in the Singapore Premier League.

=== Tampines Rovers ===
After a successful season under Tampines Rovers development team, Ryhan was called up by then coach Jürgen Raab and signed his first professional contract in 2018. At the end of the 2018 Singapore Premier League season, he was released from the club.

=== Warriors ===
While Ryhan was studying at Temasek Polytechnic, where he would feature for the school football team, his school team played a friendly against Warriors in which after the match, the ninth time Singapore Premier League champions offered him a one-year contract in which he signed for Warriors FC playing in the upcoming 2019 Singapore Premier League season. He made his unofficial debut in the club's pre-season tour in Malaysia, playing against several local clubs in the Malaysia Super League and Malaysia Premier League. On 16 March 2019, Ryhan then made his competitive debut for the club playing the full match at right-back as Warriors fell 5–1 to Hougang United in the opening league match.

He eventually played a crucial part in the Warriors' eventual cup run to the 2019 Singapore Cup Final in which his former club emerged as champions.

=== Young Lions ===
After Warriors were ordered by the FAS to sit out the 2020 Singapore Premier League season, due to financial issues, Ryhan then signed for Young Lions in 2020. He was named in Goal Singapore's 2020 NxGn list alongside players such as Ilhan Fandi and Farhan Zulkifli. He eventually enlisted in the Singapore Police Force for his National Service commitments restricting his appearances as the COVID-19 pandemic was suspended the first half of the 2020 Singapore Premier League season. On 21 November 2020, he scored his first professional goal in a 2–1 away win against Balestier Khalsa.

=== Chiangmai ===
In June 2022, Ryhan was signed by Thai League 2 club, Chiangmai ahead of the 2022–23 Thai League 2 season. On 14 August 2022, Ryhan made his debut for the club in league match against Ranong United. On 8 April 2023, he scored his first goal for the club against Udon Thani which resulted in a 6–0 victory. He ended the season with 24 appearances and contributing 1 goal and 6 assists.

=== BG Pathum United ===
After a successful spell at Chiangmai, On 27 May 2023, Ryhan was announced by BG Pathum United joining Irfan Fandi and Ikhsan Fandi in becoming the third Singaporean to play for the club. On 11 August 2023, he made his debut in the first league match against Police Tero. On 19 September 2023, Ryhan scored on his AFC Champions League debut against 2022 K League 1 champions, Ulsan Hyundai at the Ulsan Munsu Football Stadium in a 3–1 defeat. On 8 June 2024, it was announced that Ryhan would leave the club at the end of his contract on 1 July 2024. Ryhan was also part of the squad that won the 2023–24 Thai League Cup.

=== Albirex Niigata Singapore ===
On 18 September 2024, Ryhan returned to Singapore to sign for Singapore Premier League club Albirex Niigata (S) to help strengthen the club defence after a move to Austrian second division team SKN St Polten was scuppered because of work-permit issues. Ryhan made his debut for the White Swans on 20 September 2024, in a 4–1 victory against Tanjong Pagar United in the league, where he also won 'man of the match'.

=== Riteriai ===
On 17 March 2025, Ryhan signed a contract with A Lyga club Riteriai on a two-season contract where his move was facilitated by former Singaporean international, R. Sasikumar who is also his agent. He made his debut on 5 April coming on as a substitution in a 3–1 win over Panevėžys. Ryhan then played the entire match in the next match on 12 April against Banga Gargždai. Ryhan scored his first goal for the club on 19 June in a 1–0 win against Šiauliai. Ryhan left the club in late June as the club was facing financial difficulties, was close to bankruptcy and had management conflicts.

=== Kanchanaburi Power ===
On 2 July 2025, Ryhan joined newly promoted Thai League 1 side Kanchanaburi Power. He make his debut on the opening day of the 2025–26 Thai League 1 opener in a 1–1 draw to Ratchaburi on 16 August. Ryhan got his first goal involvement with the club where he assisted twice in a match for both former English Premier League footballers, Aboubakar Kamara and Andros Townsend in a 4-–0 win over Lamphun Warriors on 27 September.

=== Lion City Sailors ===
On 8 July 2026, it was announced that Ryhan signed with Lion City Sailors on a two-year contract.

== International career ==
In 2019, Ryhan was first called up to the Singapore under-22 for the 2019 Merlion Cup. He made his debut and his first start for the under-22s on 7 June 2019 against Philippines. He was then called up for the 2019 SEA Games in Manila, where Singapore U22 are to face Laos, Indonesia, Thailand, Vietnam and Brunei.

=== Senior ===
Ryhan received his first senior national team call-up in a training session in March 2021. Ryhan officially made his international debut on 14 June 2022 during the 2023 AFC Asian Cup qualification match against Myanmar in Bishkek replacing Christopher van Huizen in the 88th minute.

== Personal life ==
Ryhan was born in Singapore to a Welsh father and a Malay Singaporean mother. His younger brother, Harhys Stewart, is also a professional footballer playing primarily as a central-midfielder for Thai League 1 club Chiangrai United, on loan from BG Pathum United. He is a big fan of Liverpool and had said that his favourite player is Dirk Kuyt.

Ryhan studied at Hong Kah Secondary School in Jurong West and graduated with a diploma in a marketing course at Temasek Polytechnic in Tampines. Ryhan married Hannah Alkaff on 29 June 2025.

== Career statistics ==
=== Club ===
As of match played 7 Nov 2025

Appearances and goals by club, season and competition
Club	Season	League			National Cup		League Cup		Continental		Total	
Club	Season	Division	Apps	Goals	Apps	Goals	Apps	Goals	Apps	Goals	Apps	Goals
Tampines Rovers	2018	Singapore Premier League	0	0	0	0	0	0	0	0	0	0
Warriors	2019	Singapore Premier League	22	0	6	0	0	0	0	0	28	0
Young Lions	2020	Singapore Premier League	10	2	0	0	0	0	0	0	10	2
Young Lions	2021	Singapore Premier League	20	0	0	0	0	0	0	0	20	0
Young Lions	2022	Singapore Premier League	5	3	0	0	0	0	0	0	5	3
Young Lions	Total		35	5	0	0	0	0	0	0	35	5
Chiangmai	2022–23	Thai League 2	23	1	0	0	1	0	0	0	24	1
BG Pathum United	2023–24	Thai League 1	15	0	1	0	0	0	6 (Note: Appearance(s) in AFC Champions League Elite)	1	22	1
Albirex Niigata (S)	2024–25	Singapore Premier League	10	1	3	0	0	0	0	0	13	1
Riteriai	2025	A Lyga	11	1	1	0	0	0	0	0	12	1
Kanchanaburi Power	2025–26	Thai League 1	9	1	0	0	0	0	0	0	9	1
Career total			125	9	11	0	1	0	6	1	143	10

=== International ===
==== International caps ====
No	Date	Venue	Opponent	Result	Competition
1	14 June 2022	Dolen Omurzakov Stadium, Bishkek, Kyrgyzstan	Myanmar	6–2 (won)	2023 AFC Asian Cup qualification
2	21 September 2022	Thống Nhất Stadium, Ho Chi Minh City, Vietnam	Vietnam	0-4 (lost)	2022 VFF Tri-Nations Series
3	24 September 2022	Thống Nhất Stadium, Ho Chi Minh City, Vietnam	India	1-1 (draw)	2022 VFF Tri-Nations Series
4	17 December 2022	Jalan Besar Stadium, Kallang, Singapore	Maldives	3-1(win)	Friendly
5	24 December 2022	Jalan Besar Stadium, Kallang, Singapore	Myanmar	3-2(won)	2022 AFF Championship
6	27 December 2022	New Laos National Stadium, Vientiane, Laos	Laos	2-0(won)	2022 AFF Championship
8	26 March 2023	Macau Olympic Complex Stadium, Macau	Macau	1–0 (won)	Friendly
9	8 September 2023	Bishan Stadium, Singapore	Tajikistan	0-2 (lost)	Friendly
10	16 November 2023	Seoul World Cup Stadium, Korea	South Korea	0-5 (lost)	2026 FIFA World Cup qualification
11	21 November 2023	National Stadium, Singapore	Thailand	1-3 (lost)	2026 FIFA World Cup qualification
12	21 March 2024	National Stadium, Singapore	China	2-2 (draw)	2026 FIFA World Cup qualification
13	26 March 2024	Tianjin Olympic Center, China	China	1-4 (lost)	2026 FIFA World Cup qualification

==== U23 International caps ====
No	Date	Venue	Opponent	Result	Competition
1	7 June 2019	Jalan Besar Stadium, Kallang, Singapore	Philippines	3-0 (won)	2019 Merlion Cup
2	9 June 2019	Jalan Besar Stadium, Kallang, Singapore	Thailand	1-0 (won)	2019 Merlion Cup
3	6 September 2019	Bishan Stadium, Bishan, Singapore	Fiji	2-0 (won)	Friendly
4	9 October 2019	Bishan Stadium, Bishan, Singapore	United Arab Emirates	0-3 (lost)	Friendly
5	26 November 2019	Rizal Memorial Stadium, Manila, Philippines	Laos	0-0 (draw)	2019 Southeast Asian Games
6	28 November 2019	Rizal Memorial Stadium, Manila, Philippines	Indonesia	0-2 (lost)	Games
7	1 December 2019	Biñan Football Stadium, Manila, Philippines	Thailand	0-3 (lost)	2019 Southeast Asian Games
8	3 December 2019	Rizal Memorial Stadium, Manila, Philippines	Vietnam	0-1 (lost)	2019 Southeast Asian Games
9	5 December 2019	Rizal Memorial Stadium, Manila, Philippines	Brunei	7-0 (won)	2019 Southeast Asian Games
10	25 October 2021	Jalan Besar Stadium, Jalan Besar, Singapore	Timor-Leste	2-2 (draw)	2022 AFC U-23 Asian Cup qualification
11	28 October 2021	Jalan Besar Stadium, Jalan Besar, Singapore	Philippines	1-0 (won)	2022 AFC U-23 Asian Cup qualification
12	31 October 2021	Jalan Besar Stadium, Jalan Besar, Singapore	South Korea	1-5 (lost)	2022 AFC U-23 Asian Cup qualification
13	16 February 2022	Prince Stadium, Phnom Penh, Cambodia	Thailand	1–3 (lost)	2022 AFF U-23 Championship
14	19 February 2022	Prince Stadium, Phnom Penh, Cambodia	Vietnam	0–7 (lost)	2022 AFF U-23 Championship
15	7 May 2022	Thiên Trường Stadium, Nam Định, Vietnam	Laos	2–2 (draw)	2021 Southeast Asian Games
16	9 May 2022	Thiên Trường Stadium, Nam Định, Vietnam	Thailand	0–5 (lost)	2021 Southeast Asian Games
17	11 May 2022	Thiên Trường Stadium, Nam Định, Vietnam	Cambodia	1–0 (won)	2021 Southeast Asian Games

== Honours ==
BG Pathum United

- Thai League Cup: 2023–24

Singapore U22

- Merlion Cup: 2019
