= Arshad Shamim =

Singaporean footballer

Personal information
- Date of birth: 9 December 1999 (age 26)
- Place of birth: Singapore
- Height: 1.70 m (5 ft 7 in)
- Position: Midfielder

Team information
- Current team: Albirex Niigata (S)
- Number: 20

Youth career
- Lion City Sailors

Senior career*
Years	Team	Apps	(Gls)
2017–2023	Lion City Sailors	65	(3)
2023	→ Geylang International (loan)	9	(0)
2024–	Albirex Niigata (S)	0	(0)

International career
2017	Singapore U19	5	(0)
2019–	Singapore U23	4	(0)
- * Club domestic league appearances and goals as of 17:14, 27 July 2019 (UTC)

Mohammed Arshad Shamim bin Shamim is a Singaporean footballer who plays as a midfielder for Singapore Premier League club, Albirex Niigata (S).

== Club career ==
=== Home United (Now known as Lion City Sailors) ===
Arshad burst onto the scene earlier in the 2018 season as he marked his league debut on 22 April against Geylang International, playing the full 90 minutes in a 4–1 victory. On 27 July 2019, he scored his first ever league goal against Brunei DPMM scoring the only goal in the match to claim the three points. On 29 November 2020, Arshad was name the 'Man of the Match' for putting on a brilliant display against Young Lions scoring two goals and one assist in a 4–0 win.

==== Geylang International (loan) ====
On 27 June 2023, Arshad was loan to Geylang International until the remainder of the 2023 season.

=== Albirex Niigata Singapore ===
On 4 January 2024, Arshad joined Albirex Niigata (S) on a permanent transfer.

== International career ==
Arshad was named in the 24-man squad for a training camp in Japan ahead of the AFC U-23 Championship qualifiers in March 2019.

== Career statistics ==
=== Club ===
As of 1 Nov 2022

Club	Season	League			FA Cup		League Cup		Continental		Total	
Club	Season	Division	Apps	Goals	Apps	Goals	Apps	Goals	Apps	Goals	Apps	Goals
Home United	2017	S.League	0	0	2	0	0	0	0	0	2	0
Home United	2018	Singapore Premier League	12	0	1	0	0	0	0	0	13	0
Home United	2019	Singapore Premier League	15	1	0	0	0	0	2	0	17	1
Home United	Total		27	1	3	0	0	0	2	0	32	1
Lion City Sailors	2020	Singapore Premier League	10	2	0	0	0	0	0	0	10	2
Lion City Sailors	Total		10	2	0	0	0	0	0	0	10	2
Young Lions FC (loan)	2021	Singapore Premier League	6	0	0	0	0	0	0	0	6	0
Young Lions FC (loan)	2022	Singapore Premier League	18	0	2	0	0	0	0	0	20	0
Young Lions FC (loan)	Total		24	0	2	0	0	0	0	0	26	0
Lion City Sailors	2022	Singapore Premier League	0	0	0	0	0	0	0	0	0	0
Lion City Sailors	2023	Singapore Premier League	4	0	0	0	0	0	0	0	4	0
Lion City Sailors	Total		4	0	0	0	0	0	0	0	4	0
Geylang International (loan)	2023	Singapore Premier League	9	0	3	0	0	0	0	0	12	0
Geylang International (loan)	Total		9	0	3	0	0	0	0	0	12	0
Albirex Niigata (S)	2024–25	Singapore Premier League	15	0	0	0	0	0	0	0	15	0
Albirex Niigata (S)	Total		15	0	0	0	0	0	0	0	15	0
Career total			89	3	8	0	0	0	2	0	99	3

=== International ===
==== U23 International caps ====
No	Date	Venue	Opponent	Result	Competition
1	26 March 2019	MFF Football Centre, Ulaanbaatar, Mongolia	Mongolia	3-1 (won)	2020 AFC U-23 Championship qualification
2	9 May 2022	Thiên Trường Stadium, Nam Định, Vietnam	Thailand	0–5 (lost)	2021 Southeast Asian Games
3	11 May 2022	Thiên Trường Stadium, Nam Định, Vietnam	Cambodia	1–0 (won)	2021 Southeast Asian Games
4	14 May 2022	Thiên Trường Stadium, Nam Định, Vietnam	Malaysia	2–2 (draw)	2021 Southeast Asian Games

==== U19 International caps ====
No	Date	Venue	Opponent	Result	Competition
1	4 September 2017	Thuwunna Stadium, Yangon, Myanmar	Cambodia	5-3 (won)	2017 AFF U-18 Youth Championship
2	6 September 2017	Thuwunna Stadium, Yangon, Myanmar	Malaysia	1-3 (lost)	2017 AFF U-18 Youth Championship
3	10 September 2017	Thuwunna Stadium, Yangon, Myanmar	Thailand	0-2 (lost)	2017 AFF U-18 Youth Championship
4	6 November 2017	MFF Football Centre, Ulaanbaatar, Mongolia	Japan	0-7 (lost)	2018 AFC U-19 Championship qualification
5	8 November 2017	MFF Football Centre, Ulaanbaatar, Mongolia	Mongolia	2-4 (lost)	2018 AFC U-19 Championship qualification
