= Football at the 2021 SEA Games – Men's tournament =

2021 SEA Games Men's Football Tournament

Tournament details
- Host country: Vietnam
- Dates: 6–22 May 2022
- Teams: 10 (from 10 associations)
- Venue: 3 (in 3 host cities)

Final positions
- Champions: Vietnam (3rd title)
- Runners-up: Thailand
- Third place: Indonesia
- Fourth place: Malaysia

Tournament statistics
- Matches played: 24
- Goals scored: 74 (3.08 per match)
- Top scorer(s): 7 players (3 goals each)

The men's football tournament at the 2021 SEA Games was held from 6 – 22 May 2022 in Vietnam. Ten Southeast Asian nations participated in the men's tournament. The group stage and semi-finals were played in Việt Trì and Nam Định, while Hanoi hosted the bronze and gold medal matches. Men's teams are restricted to under-23 players (born on or after 1 January 1999) with a maximum of three over-aged players allowed.

The tournament was won by Vietnam, who won their second title as a unified nation, having previously won it in 2019, and their third title in total, by beating Thailand 1–0 in the final. This victory also let Vietnam became the Gold Medal team that never concede any goal in the tournament for the first time since the 1979 tournament (and also the only team in U–23). Indonesia won the bronze medal after defeating Malaysia on penalties.

== Competition schedule ==
The following is the competition schedule for the men's football competition:

G	Group stage	½	Semifinals	B	3rd place play-off	F	Final

Event	Fri 6	Sat 7	Sun 8	Mon 9	Tue 10	Wed 11	Thu 12	Fri 13	Sat 14	Sun 15	Mon 16	Tue 17	Wed 18	Thu 19	Fri 20	Sat 21	Sun 22	
Men	G	G	G	G	G	G		G	G	G	G			½			B	F

== Venues ==
Three venues were used during the tournament, two of them outside of Hanoi at cities around Vietnam. Mỹ Đình National Stadium hosted the Bronze medal match and the Gold medal Match.

Football at the 2021 SEA Games – Men's tournament (Vietnam)	Hà Nội	Phú Thọ	Nam Định
Football at the 2021 SEA Games – Men's tournament (Vietnam)	Mỹ Đình National Stadium	Việt Trì Stadium	Thiên Trường Stadium
Football at the 2021 SEA Games – Men's tournament (Vietnam)	Capacity: 40,192	Capacity: 16,000	Capacity: 30,000

== Participating nations ==
- Cambodia
- Indonesia
- Laos
- Malaysia
- Myanmar
- Philippines
- Singapore
- Thailand
- Timor-Leste
- Vietnam (hosts)

== Draw ==
The draw for the tournament was held on 6 April 2022. 10 teams were seeded into 5 pots based on their performance in the previous two editions. The host, also the defending champion, Vietnam was automatically assigned into position A1. Thailand, as the champion in 2017, was assigned into position B1.

Pot 1	Pot 2	Pot 3	Pot 4	Pot 5
Vietnam (H), (C); Thailand	Indonesia; Malaysia	Myanmar; Cambodia	Philippines; Singapore	Laos; Timor-Leste

== Squads ==
The men's tournament is an under-23 international tournament, with a maximum of three overage players allowed.

== Group stage ==
=== Group A ===
Pos	Team	Pld	W	D	L	GF	GA	GD	Pts	Qualification
1	Vietnam (H)	4	3	1	0	6	0	+6	10	Advance to Semi-finals
2	Indonesia	4	3	0	1	11	5	+6	9	Advance to Semi-finals
3	Myanmar	4	2	0	2	7	8	−1	6	
4	Philippines	4	1	1	2	6	7	−1	4	
5	Timor-Leste	4	0	0	4	3	13	−10	0	

Source: FIFA
(H) Hosts
6 May 2022
16:00

Philippines	4–0	Timor-Leste
Rontini 12'; Chung 56'; Bedic 78'; Kekkonen 81'	Report

Việt Trì Stadium, Phú Thọ
Attendance: 5,373
Referee: C. R. Srikrishna (India)
6 May 2022
19:00

Vietnam	3–0	Indonesia
Nguyễn Tiến Linh 54'; Đỗ Hùng Dũng 74'; Lê Văn Đô 87'	Report

Việt Trì Stadium, Phú Thọ
Attendance: 16,188
Referee: Choi Hyun-jai (South Korea)

8 May 2022
16:00

Timor-Leste	2–3	Myanmar
Mouzinho 52'; Soares 64'	Report	Win Naing Tun 37'; Htet Phyo Wai 41'; Aung Wunna Soe 90+5'

Việt Trì Stadium, Phú Thọ
Attendance: 3,568
Referee: Mohammad Issa (Lebanon)
8 May 2022
19:00

Vietnam	0–0	Philippines
	Report

Việt Trì Stadium, Phú Thọ
Attendance: 16,585
Referee: Feras Taweel (Syria)

10 May 2022
16:00

Myanmar	3–2	Philippines
Win Naing Tun 2'; Lwin Moe Aung 51'; Soe Moe Kyaw 53'	Report	Bedic 35', 38' (pen.)

Việt Trì Stadium, Phú Thọ
Attendance: 1,268
Referee: Mohammad Arafah (Jordan)
10 May 2022
19:00

Indonesia	4–1	Timor-Leste
Egy 16'; Witan 52', 77'; Fachruddin 59'	Report	Mouzinho 69'

Việt Trì Stadium, Phú Thọ
Attendance: 3,133
Referee: Ammar Ashkanani (Kuwait)

13 May 2022
16:00

Philippines	0–4	Indonesia
	Report	Ridwan 18'; Ridho 44'; Egy 74'; Marselino 85' (pen.)

Việt Trì Stadium, Phú Thọ
Attendance: 2,661
Referee: Mahmood Al-Majarafi (Oman)
13 May 2022
19:00

Myanmar	0–1	Vietnam
	Report	Đỗ Hùng Dũng 76'

Việt Trì Stadium, Phú Thọ
Attendance: 15,975
Referee: C. R. Srikrishna (India)

15 May 2022
16:00

Indonesia	3–1	Myanmar
Egy 6'; Witan 10'; Marselino 45+2'	Report	Win Naing Tun 67'

Việt Trì Stadium, Phú Thọ
Attendance: 2,519
Referee: Mohammad Arafah (Jordan)
15 May 2022
19:00

Timor-Leste	0–2	Vietnam
	Report	Nguyễn Văn Tùng 53'; Hồ Thanh Minh 65'

Việt Trì Stadium, Phú Thọ
Attendance: 14,160
Referee: Mohammad Issa (Lebanon)

=== Group B ===
Pos	Team	Pld	W	D	L	GF	GA	GD	Pts	Qualification
1	Thailand	4	3	0	1	12	2	+10	9	Advance to Semi-finals
2	Malaysia	4	2	2	0	9	6	+3	8	Advance to Semi-finals
3	Singapore	4	1	2	1	5	9	−4	5	
4	Cambodia	4	1	1	2	6	9	−3	4	
5	Laos	4	0	1	3	4	10	−6	1	

Source: FIFA
7 May 2022
16:00

Singapore	2–2	Laos
Glenn Kweh 89'; Emaviwe 90+6'	Report	Ekkamai 14'; Chony 50'

Thiên Trường Stadium, Nam Định
Attendance: 10,152
Referee: Nivon Robesh Gamini (Sri Lanka)
7 May 2022
19:00

Thailand	1–2	Malaysia
Gustavsson 33'	Report	Danial 61'; Anusak 90+4' (o.g.)

Thiên Trường Stadium, Nam Định
Attendance: 29,985
Referee: Nasrullo Kabirov (Tajikistan)

9 May 2022
16:00

Laos	1–4	Cambodia
Phouvieng 67'	Report	Chanthea 4'; Anantaza 14' (o.g.); Rina 63'; Som Oun 71'

Thiên Trường Stadium, Nam Định
Attendance: 6,044
Referee: Mohammad Ghabayen (Jordan)
9 May 2022
19:00

Thailand	5–0	Singapore
Davis 45+1' (pen.); H. Stewart 48' (o.g.); Ekanit 51', 66'; Korawich 81'	Report

Thiên Trường Stadium, Nam Định
Attendance: 28,998
Referee: Adam Fazeel (Maldives)

11 May 2022
16:00

Cambodia	0–1	Singapore
	Report	Saifullah 36'

Thiên Trường Stadium, Nam Định
Attendance: 11,578
Referee: Ngô Duy Lân (Vietnam)
11 May 2022
19:00

Malaysia	3–1	Laos
Luqman 36', 68'; Syahir 43'	Report	Visith 85'

Thiên Trường Stadium, Nam Định
Attendance: 25,623
Referee: Yahya Ali Al Mulla (United Arab Emirates)

14 May 2022
16:00

Singapore	2–2	Malaysia
Shah 7'; H. Stewart 78'	Report	Luqman 4'; Faiz 82'

Thiên Trường Stadium, Nam Định
Attendance: 1,149
Referee: Venkatesh Ramachandran (India)
14 May 2022
19:00

Cambodia	0–5	Thailand
	Report	Chonnapat 4'; Korawich 31'; Worachit 41'; Gustavsson 72', 88'

Thiên Trường Stadium, Nam Định
Attendance: 5,623
Referee: Nivon Robesh Gamini (Sri Lanka)

16 May 2022
16:00

Malaysia	2–2	Cambodia
Hadi 51' (pen.), 68'	Report	Chanchav 45+2' (pen.); Ty 61'

Thiên Trường Stadium, Nam Định
Referee: Nasrullo Kabirov (Tajikistan)
16 May 2022
19:00

Laos	0–1	Thailand
	Report	At 19' (o.g.)

Thiên Trường Stadium, Nam Định
Referee: Mohammad Ghabayen (Jordan)

== Knockout stage ==
Semi-finals
19 May – Phú Thọ
Vietnam (a.e.t.)	1
Malaysia	0
19 May – Nam Định
Thailand (a.e.t.)	1
Indonesia	0

Gold medal match
22 May – Hà Nội
Vietnam	1
Thailand	0
Bronze medal match
22 May – Hà Nội
Malaysia	1 (3)
Indonesia (p)	1 (4)

=== Semi-finals ===
19 May 2022
16:00

Thailand	1–0 (a.e.t.)	Indonesia
Weerathep 95'	Report

Thiên Trường Stadium, Nam Định
Attendance: 30,000
Referee: Yahya Ali Al Mulla (United Arab Emirates)
19 May 2022
19:00

Vietnam	1–0 (a.e.t.)	Malaysia
Nguyễn Tiến Linh 111'	Report

Việt Trì Stadium, Phú Thọ
Referee: Feras Taweel (Syria)

=== Bronze medal match ===
22 May 2022
16:00

Malaysia	1–1	Indonesia (bronze)
Hadi 81'	Report	Ronaldo 69'
Penalties
Hadi (penalty missed); Hairiey (penalty scored); Luqman (penalty missed); Harith (penalty scored); Mukhairi (penalty scored)	3–4	(penalty missed) Asnawi; (penalty scored) Ridwan; (penalty scored) Marselino; (penalty scored) Saddil; (penalty scored) Klok

Mỹ Đình National Stadium, Hà Nội
Referee: Adam Fazeel (Maldives)

=== Gold medal match ===
22 May 2022
19:00

(gold) Vietnam	1–0	Thailand (silver)
Nhâm Mạnh Dũng 83'	Report

Mỹ Đình National Stadium, Hà Nội
Referee: Mahmood Al-Majarafi (Oman)

== Winners ==
2021 SEA Games Men's Tournament
(Vietnam)
Vietnam
Third title

== Goalscorers ==
There were 74 goals scored in 24 matches, for an average of 3.08 goals per match.

3 goals

- (Indonesia) Witan Sulaeman
- (Indonesia) Egy Maulana Vikri
- (Malaysia) Hadi Fayyadh
- (Malaysia) Luqman Hakim Shamsudin
- (Myanmar) Win Naing Tun
- (Philippines) Jovin Bedic
- (Thailand) Patrik Gustavsson

2 goals

- (Indonesia) Marselino Ferdinan
- (Thailand) Ekanit Panya
- (Thailand) Korawich Tasa
- (Timor-Leste) Mouzinho
- (Vietnam) Đỗ Hùng Dũng
- (Vietnam) Nguyễn Tiến Linh

1 goal

- (Cambodia) Choun Chanchav
- (Cambodia) Im Som Oun
- (Cambodia) Ky Rina
- (Cambodia) Sa Ty
- (Cambodia) Sieng Chanthea
- (Indonesia) Fachruddin Aryanto
- (Indonesia) Ronaldo Kwateh
- (Indonesia) Rizky Ridho
- (Indonesia) Muhamad Ridwan
- (Laos) Visith Bounpaserth
- (Laos) Phouvieng Phounsavath
- (Laos) Ekkamai Ratxachak
- (Laos) Chony Waenpaseuth
- (Malaysia) Danial Asri
- (Malaysia) Syahir Bashah
- (Malaysia) Faiz Amer Runnizar
- (Myanmar) Aung Wunna Soe
- (Myanmar) Htet Phyo Wai
- (Myanmar) Lwin Moe Aung
- (Myanmar) Soe Moe Kyaw
- (Philippines) Dennis Chung
- (Philippines) Oskari Kekkonen
- (Philippines) Christian Rontini
- (Singapore) Saifullah Akbar
- (Singapore) Jordan Emaviwe
- (Singapore) Glenn Kweh
- (Singapore) Shah Shahiran
- (Singapore) Harhys Stewart
- (Thailand) Chonnapat Buaphan
- (Thailand) Ben Davis
- (Thailand) Worachit Kanitsribampen
- (Thailand) Weerathep Pomphan
- (Timor-Leste) Jaimito Soares
- (Vietnam) Hồ Thanh Minh
- (Vietnam) Lê Văn Đô
- (Vietnam) Nguyễn Văn Tùng
- (Vietnam) Nhâm Mạnh Dũng

1 own goal

- (Thailand) Anusak Jaiphet (against Malaysia)
- (Laos) Anantaza Siphongphan (against Cambodia)
- (Laos) At Viengkham (against Thailand)
- (Singapore) Harhys Stewart (against Thailand)

== Final ranking ==
Pos	Team	Pld	W	D	L	GF	GA	GD	Pts	Final result
1	Vietnam (H)	6	5	1	0	8	0	+8	16	Gold Medal
2	Thailand	6	4	0	2	13	3	+10	12	Silver Medal
3	Indonesia	6	3	1	2	12	7	+5	10	Bronze Medal
4	Malaysia	6	2	3	1	10	8	+2	9	Fourth place
5	Myanmar	4	2	0	2	7	8	−1	6	Eliminated in group stage
6	Singapore	4	1	2	1	5	9	−4	5	Eliminated in group stage
7	Philippines	4	1	1	2	6	7	−1	4	Eliminated in group stage
8	Cambodia	4	1	1	2	6	9	−3	4	Eliminated in group stage
9	Laos	4	0	1	3	4	10	−6	1	Eliminated in group stage
10	Timor-Leste	4	0	0	4	3	13	−10	0	Eliminated in group stage

(H) Hosts

== See also ==
- Futsal at the 2021 SEA Games
- Football at the 2021 SEA Games - Women's tournament
- Football at the 2021 SEA Games
- Futsal at the 2021 SEA Games - Men's tournament
- Futsal at the 2021 SEA Games - Women's tournament
- 2021 SEA Games
