= Jordan Emaviwe =

Singaporean footballer

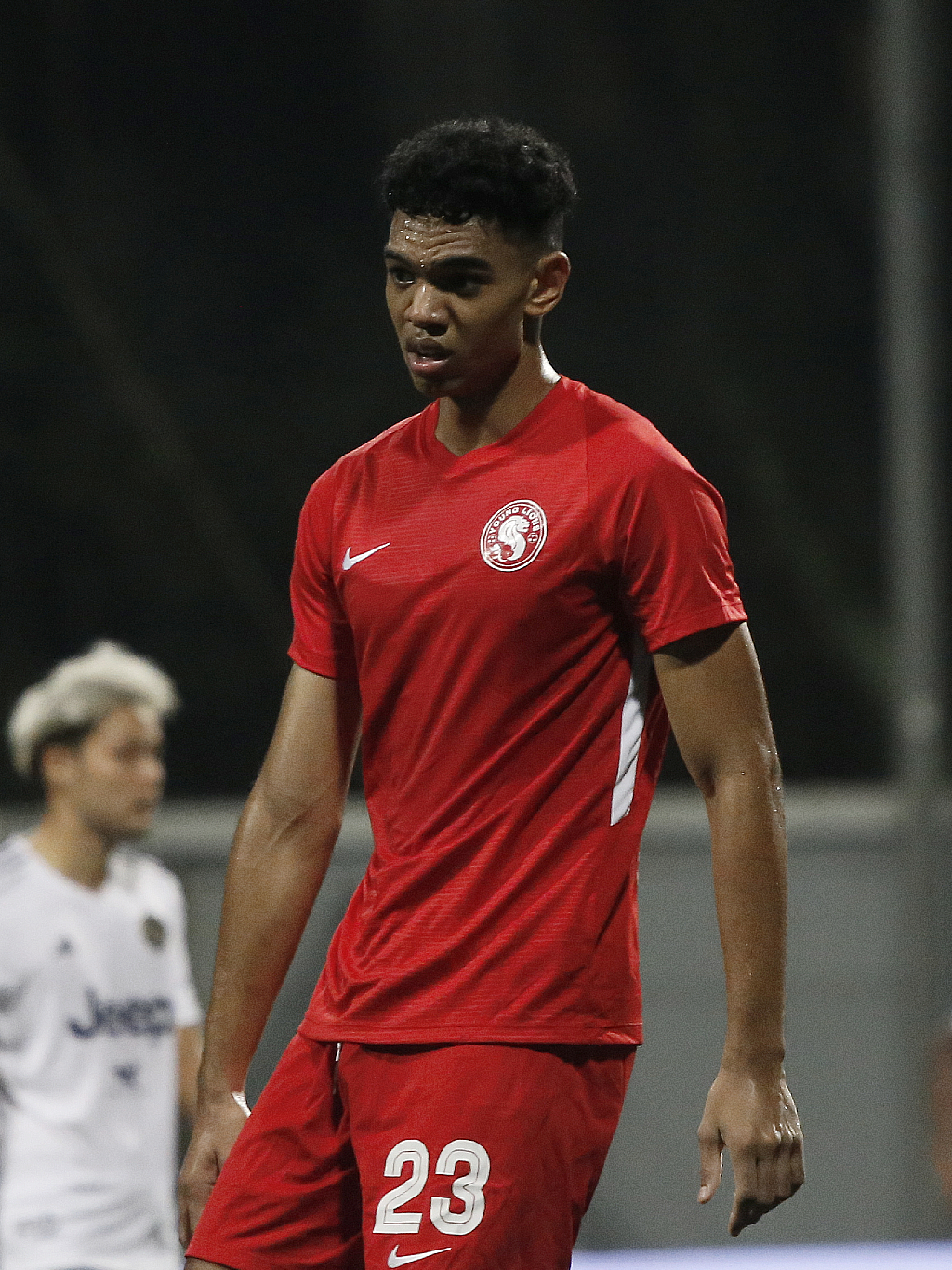
- Jordan playing for Young Lions in 2023

Personal information
- Full name: Jordan Efa Okwudili Emaviwe
- Date of birth: 9 April 2001 (age 25)
- Place of birth: Singapore
- Height: 1.95 m (6 ft 5 in)
- Position: Left-back

Team information
- Current team: Hougang United
- Number: 90

Youth career
- –2014: St. Patrick's School
- 2015: Balestier Khalsa
- 2016–2017: St. Patrick's School
- 2017–2018: → Castiglione (youth loan)
- 2017–2020: Chiasso

Senior career*
Years	Team	Apps	(Gls)
2020–2024	Balestier Khalsa	34	(5)
2021–2023	→ Young Lions (loan)	29	(7)
2025	Chiangrai United	13	(5)
2025	BG Pathum United	7	(0)
2026	Chiangrai United	11	(2)
2026–	Hougang United	0	(0)

International career^{‡}
2021–2024	Singapore U23	16	(3)
2024–	Singapore	11	(0)
- * Club domestic league appearances and goals as of 01:38, 24 February 2026 (UTC) ‡ National team caps and goals as of 18 November 2025

Jordan Efa Okwudili Emaviwe (born 9 April 2001), better known as Jordan Emaviwe, is a Singaporean professional footballer who plays as a left-back for Singapore Premier League club Hougang United and the Singapore national team. A left-back, he can also be played either as a centre-back or striker.

== Club career ==
=== Youth career ===
In 2017, Jordan was given an opportunity to join Italian Serie D club, Castiglione on a loan move from Saint Patrick's School.

Jordan then caught the eyes of the Switzerland second-tier side, Chiasso after playing for Castiglione in a match against Chiasso. He then spent three years at the Switzerland club, Chiasso from 2017 to 2020. He is the second Singaporean to follow the footsteps of V. Sundramoorthy in signing a first-team professional contract with a Switzerland club.

=== Balestier Khalsa ===
In November 2020, Jordan returned to Singapore to sign with Singapore Premier League club Balestier Khalsa. On 22 June 2023, Jordan returned to Balestier Khalsa midway throughout the 2023 Singapore Premier League season.

==== Loan to Young Lions ====
Jordan then signed a loan deal with the Young Lions in 2021 while serving his national service. For the 2023 season, he changed his position from his regular centre-back position to a striker as Young Lions suffered a few injuries crisis for that position.

==== Return to Balestier and departure ====
Jordan returned to his parent club ahead of the 2024–25 season. On 8 December 2024, it was announced that Jordan would be leaving the club and will continue his career overseas. He scored 4 goals in 18 appearances in the 2024–25 season.

=== Chiangrai United ===
On 7 January 2025, Thai League 1 club Chiangrai United announced the signing of Jordan through their social media where he joined fellow Singaporean, Harhys Stewart at the club. He made his debut for the club in a 8–0 thrashing win to champions Buriram United on 15 January playing the full 90th minute. In the next match, Jordan was instrumental in the team defence as he kept a clean sheet in a 1–0 win to BG Pathum United which see him being name in the league round 18 'Team of the Week'. On 8 March, Jordan scored his first goal for the club where he opened up the account in the match however, his team suffered a 3–2 lost to Bangkok United. In the next match against Rayong on 16 March, Jordan scored the only goal in the match where he dribble past the entire opponent defence to scored the goal. Jordan ended up scoring in five consecutive matches for the club notably for scoring a brace in the 2–1 league win over Nongbua Pitchaya on 4 April and also scoring in the 2–1 lost to Buriram United in the 2024–25 Thai FA Cup round of 16 tie on 9 April.

=== BG Pathum United ===
On 20 June 2025, Thai League 1 club BG Pathum United announced the signing of Jordan ahead of the 2025–26 season. He made his debut for the club on 16 August in a 2–2 draw to PT Prachuap. On 18 September, Jordan make his AFC Champions League Two debut in a 1–0 lost to Korean club Pohang Steelers on 18 September. He scored his first AFC Champions League Two goal on 23 October in a 2–0 win over Kaya–Iloilo in New Clark City.

=== Back to Chiangrai United ===
On 19 December 2025, it was announced that Jordan would be joining Chiangrai United on a permanent deal.

Hougang United

On 8 August 2026, it was announced that Singapore Premier League club Hougang United have signed Jordan on a permanent deal from Chiangrai United to further strengthen the squad for the 2026/27 campaign.

== International career ==
=== Youth ===
Jordan was born in Singapore to a Nigerian father and a Singaporean Chinese mother. He represents Singapore at international level and played at the 2021 Southeast Asian Games.

He helped the Singapore U23 team snatched a draw from the jaws of damaging defeat in their opening match at the 2021 SEA Games against Laos with a 96 minute stoppage time goal.

=== Senior ===
On 18 November 2024, Jordan made his debut for the Singapore national team where he was on the starting line-up against the Chinese Taipei. In December 2024, he was called up for the 2024 ASEAN Championship. He made his tournament debut coming on as a substitute on 14 December against Timor-Leste. On 18 November 2025, he was part of the historical squad which claimed a 2-1 victory away from home against Hong Kong as Singapore qualified for the 2027 AFC Asian Cup after decades in waiting.

== Personal life ==
Jordan's father Prince played for Tampines Rovers during the 2001 S.League season and married a Chinese Singaporean, the late Elaine Ong.

== Career statistics ==
=== Club ===
As of match played 13 Apr 26

Appearances and goals by club, season and competition
Club	Season	League			National Cup		League Cup		Continental		Total	
Club	Season	Division	Apps	Goals	Apps	Goals	Apps	Goals	Apps	Goals	Apps	Goals
Balestier Khalsa	2020	Singapore Premier League	6	0	0	0	0	0	0	0	6	0
Balestier Khalsa	2021	Singapore Premier League	0	0	0	0	0	0	0	0	0	0
Balestier Khalsa	2023	Singapore Premier League	10	1	3	0	0	0	0	0	13	1
Balestier Khalsa	2024–25	Singapore Premier League	18	4	0	0	0	0	0	0	18	4
Balestier Khalsa	Total		34	5	3	0	0	0	0	0	37	5
Young Lions (loan)	2021	Singapore Premier League	2	0	0	0	0	0	—		2	0
Young Lions (loan)	2022	Singapore Premier League	20	4	1	1	0	0	—		21	5
Young Lions (loan)	2023	Singapore Premier League	7	3	0	0	0	0	—		7	3
Young Lions (loan)	Total		29	7	1	1	0	0	0	0	30	8
Chiangrai United	2024–25	Thai League 1	13	5	2	1	2	0	0	0	17	6
BG Pathum United	2025–26	Thai League 1	7	0	1	0	0	0	5 (Note: 5 appearance in AFC Champion League 2)	1 (Note: 1 goal in AFC Champion League 2)	13	1
Chiangrai United	2025–26	Thai League 1	7	2	1	0	1	0	0	0	9	2
Career total			89	19	8	2	3	0	5	1	106	22
