= Shah Shahiran =

Singaporean footballer

Personal information
- Full name: Nur Muhammad Shah bin Shahiran
- Date of birth: 14 November 1999 (age 26)
- Place of birth: Singapore
- Height: 1.73 m (5 ft 8 in)
- Positions: Defensive midfielder; centre-back

Team information
- Current team: Tampines Rovers
- Number: 8

Senior career*
Years	Team	Apps	(Gls)
2018–	Tampines Rovers	103	(5)
2021	→ Young Lions (loan)	32	(2)

International career^{‡}
2017	Singapore U19	3	(0)
2019–2022	Singapore U23	15	(1)
2022–	Singapore	38	(1)
- * Club domestic league appearances and goals as of 9 September 2021 ‡ National team caps and goals as of 18 November 2025

Nur Muhammad Shah bin Shahiran (born 14 November 1999) is a Singaporean professional footballer who plays either as a central-midfielder or a centre-back for Singapore Premier League club Tampines Rovers and the Singapore national team.

Mainly a central-midfielder in his career, he was positioned to be a centre-back for the 2023 campaign to play alongside Shuya Yamashita.

== Club career ==
=== Tampines Rovers ===
In 2022, Shah signed a five-year contract with Tampines Rovers.

On 17 May 2024, Shah make his 100th appearance for the club in the Eastern Derby against Geylang International.

== International career ==
Shah was first called up to the national team in 2022, for the FAS Tri-Nations Series 2022 against Malaysia and Philippines on 26 and 29 March 2022 respectively. Shah made his international debut on 29 March 2022, coming on as a late substitute for Song Ui-young, in a 2–0 win against Philippines.

Shah scored his first goal for the Lions in the opening match against Myanmar in the 2022 AFF Championship, helping his team to a 3–2 win.

On 14 November 2024, Shah captained Singapore during a friendly match against Myanmar.

== Career statistics ==
=== Club ===
As of 18 Apr 2023.

Club	Season	League			FA Cup		League Cup / Others		Continental		Total	
Club	Season	Division	Apps	Goals	Apps	Goals	Apps	Goals	Apps	Goals	Apps	Goals
Tampines Rovers	2018	Singapore Premier League	9	0	0	0	0	0	4	0	13	0
Tampines Rovers	2019	Singapore Premier League	23	2	5	0	0	0	4	0	32	2
Tampines Rovers	2020	Singapore Premier League	14	0	0	0	1	0	4	0	19	0
Tampines Rovers	2021	Singapore Premier League	6	0	0	0	0	0	0	0	6	0
Tampines Rovers	Total		52	2	5	0	1	0	12	0	70	2
Young Lions FC (loan)	2021	Singapore Premier League	9	1	0	0	0	0	0	0	9	1
Young Lions FC (loan)	2022	Singapore Premier League	23	1	2	0	0	0	0	0	25	1
Young Lions FC (loan)	Total		32	2	2	0	0	0	0	0	34	2
Tampines Rovers	2023	Singapore Premier League	22	1	6	0	0	0	1	0	29	1
Tampines Rovers	2024–25	Singapore Premier League	18	0	0	0	0	0	3	1	21	1
Tampines Rovers	Total		40	1	6	0	0	0	4	1	50	2
Career total			124	4	11	0	1	0	16	1	154	6

=== International ===
Appearances and goals by national team and year
National team	Year	Apps	Goals
Singapore
Singapore	2022	10	1
Total		8	1

==== International caps ====
No	Date	Venue	Opponent	Result	Competition
1	29 March 2022	National Stadium, Kallang, Singapore	Philippines	2–0 (won)	2022 FAS Tri-Nations Series
4	8 June 2022	Dolen Omurzakov Stadium, Bishkek, Kyrgyzstan	Kyrgyzstan	1–2 (lost)	2023 AFC Asian Cup qualification
4	11 June 2022	Dolen Omurzakov Stadium, Bishkek, Kyrgyzstan	Tajikistan	0–1 (lost)	2023 AFC Asian Cup qualification
5	14 June 2022	Dolen Omurzakov Stadium, Bishkek, Kyrgyzstan	Myanmar	6–2 (won)	2023 AFC Asian Cup qualification
6	21 Sept 2022	Thống Nhất Stadium, Ho Chi Minh City, Vietnam	Vietnam	0–4 (lost)	2022 VFF Tri-Nations Series
7	24 Sept 2022	Thống Nhất Stadium, Ho Chi Minh City, Vietnam	India	1–1 (draw)	2022 VFF Tri-Nations Series
8	17 December 2022	Jalan Besar Stadium, Kallang, Singapore	Maldives	3–1 (won)	Friendly
9	24 December 2022	Jalan Besar Stadium, Kallang, Singapore	Myanmar	3–2 (won)	2022 AFF Championship
10	27 December 2022	New Laos National Stadium, Vientiane, Laos	Laos	2-0(won)	2022 AFF Championship
13	16 June 2023	National Stadium, Singapore	Papua New Guinea	2-2	Friendly
14	8 Sept 2023	Bishan Stadium, Singapore	Tajikistan	0-2 (lost)	Friendly
15	12 Sept 2023	Bishan Stadium, Singapore	Chinese Taipei	3-1 (win)	Friendly

==== International goals ====
Scores and results list Singapore's goal tally first.

#	Date	Venue	Opponent	Score	Result	Competition
1.	24 December 2022	Jalan Besar Stadium, Kallang, Singapore	Myanmar	2–1	3–2	2022 AFF Championship

==== U23 International caps ====
No	Date	Venue	Opponent	Result	Competition
1	6 September 2019	Bishan Stadium, Bishan, Singapore	Fiji	2-0 (won)	Friendly
2	9 October 2019	Bishan Stadium, Bishan, Singapore	United Arab Emirates	0-3 (lost)	Friendly
3	26 November 2019	Rizal Memorial Stadium, Manila, Philippines	Laos	0-0 (draw)	2019 Southeast Asian Games
4	28 November 2019	Rizal Memorial Stadium, Manila, Philippines	Indonesia	0-2 (lost)	2019 Southeast Asian Games
5	1 December 2019	Biñan Football Stadium, Manila, Philippines	Thailand	0-3 (lost)	2019 Southeast Asian Games
6	5 December 2019	Rizal Memorial Stadium, Manila, Philippines	Brunei	7-0 (won)	2019 Southeast Asian Games
7	25 October 2021	Jalan Besar Stadium, Jalan Besar, Singapore	Timor-Leste	2-2 (draw)	2022 AFC U-23 Asian Cup qualification
8	28 October 2021	Jalan Besar Stadium, Jalan Besar, Singapore	Philippines	1-0 (won)	2022 AFC U-23 Asian Cup qualification
9	31 October 2021	Jalan Besar Stadium, Jalan Besar, Singapore	South Korea	1-5 (lost)	2022 AFC U-23 Asian Cup qualification
10	16 February 2022	Prince Stadium, Phnom Penh, Cambodia	Thailand	1–3 (lost)	2022 AFF U-23 Championship
11	19 February 2022	Prince Stadium, Phnom Penh, Cambodia	Vietnam	0–7 (lost)	2022 AFF U-23 Championship
12	7 May 2022	Thiên Trường Stadium, Nam Định, Vietnam	Laos	2–2 (draw)	2021 Southeast Asian Games
13	9 May 2022	Thiên Trường Stadium, Nam Định, Vietnam	Thailand	0–5 (lost)	2021 Southeast Asian Games
14	11 May 2022	Thiên Trường Stadium, Nam Định, Vietnam	Cambodia	1–0 (won)	2021 Southeast Asian Games
15	14 May 2022	Thiên Trường Stadium, Nam Định, Vietnam	Malaysia	2–2 (draw)	2021 Southeast Asian Games

==== U23 International goals ====
No	Date	Venue	Opponent	Score	Result	Competition
1	14 May 2022	Thiên Trường Stadium, Nam Định, Vietnam	Malaysia	1–1	2–2 (draw)	2021 Southeast Asian Games

==== U19 International caps ====
No	Date	Venue	Opponent	Result	Competition
1	17 March 2017	Po Kong Village Road Park, Diamond Hill, Hong Kong	Thailand	3-1 (won)	2017 Jockey Cup
2	18 March 2017	Po Kong Village Road Park, Diamond Hill, Hong Kong	Hong Kong	0-1 (lost)	2017 Jockey Cup
3	19 March 2017	Po Kong Village Road Park, Diamond Hill, Hong Kong	Chinese Taipei	1-1 (draw)	2017 Jockey Cup

== Honours ==
Tampines Rovers

- Singapore Cup: 2019
- Singapore Community Shield: 2020, 2025
