= Harhys Stewart =

Singaporean footballer

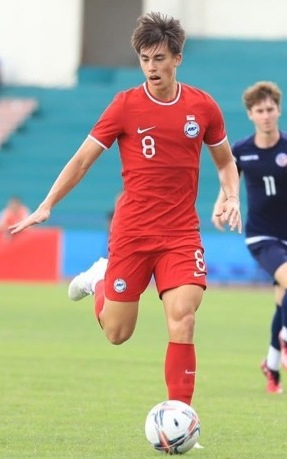
- Stewart playing for Singapore U23 during the 2024 AFC U-23 Asian Cup qualification match against Guam U23

Personal information
- Full name: Harhys Rizal Gareth Stewart bin Muhammad Ian Stewart
- Date of birth: 20 March 2001 (age 25)
- Place of birth: Singapore
- Height: 1.85 m (6 ft 1 in)
- Position: Midfielder

Team information
- Current team: Chiangrai United
- Number: 9

Youth career
- Singapore Sports School
- –2019: NFA
- 2019: Hougang United

Senior career*
Years	Team	Apps	(Gls)
2020–2023	Young Lions	72	(5)
2024	BG Pathum United	0	(0)
2024	→ Chiangrai United (loan)	14	(2)
2024–2025	Chiangrai United	29	(4)
2025	Ferizaj	0	(0)
2025–2026	Uthai Thani	31	(2)
2026–	Chiangrai United	3	(0)

International career^{‡}
2019–2020	Singapore U19	6	(0)
2021–2024	Singapore U23	16	(1)
2024–	Singapore	24	(3)
- * Club domestic league appearances and goals as of 01:39, 24 February 2026 (UTC) ‡ National team caps and goals as of 28 September 2026

Harhys Rizal Gareth Stewart bin Muhammad Ian Stewart (born 20 March 2001) is a Singaporean professional footballer who plays as a midfielder for Thai League 1 club Chiangrai United and the Singapore national team. Primarily a central-midfielder, Harhys is also capable of playing as a defensive-midfielder and occasionally as a right-back.

He is the younger brother of Ryhan Stewart, who is also a professional footballer currently playing for Singapore Premier League club Lion City Sailors.

== Club career ==
=== Young Lions ===
Haryhs signed for Young Lions in 2020. He made his professional debut on 1 March 2020 in a 1–4 lost against Hougang United. He was named in Goal Singapore's NxGn 2020 list shortly after his first appearance at senior level.

On 31 July 2021, Haryhs scored his first professional goal in a 3–2 win Balestier Khalsa.

Throughout the 2023 Singapore Premier League season, he was named the club captain after actual captain, Jacob Mahler moved to Madura United.

=== BG Pathum United ===
On 18 January 2024, Haryhs sealed his first overseas move by signing a one-and-a-half-year contract with Thai League 1 club, BG Pathum United in which saw him move on loan to fellow league side Chiangrai United.

==== Loan to Chiangrai United ====
On 18 January 2024, Stewart joined Chiangrai United until the end of the 2023–24 Thai League 1 season in June. He made his official debut coming on as a substitute during a league match against Uthai Thani in a 1–1 draw on 11 February. On 19 April, he scored the equaliser against Port and the winner which is his first and second goal for the club, being his first goals in Thailand with a brace.

=== Chiangrai United ===
Following his loan spell, Harhys made a permanent move to Chiangrai United for the 2024–25 season. He made a total of 24 league appearances with 3 goals.

=== Ferizaj ===
On 13 June 2025, it was announced that Harhys had joined Football Superleague of Kosovo side Ferizaj ahead of the 2026–26 season on a two-years contract. This move meant that Harhys would be playing in Europe for the first time in his career, and also making him the first Singaporean to play for a Kosovar team. Harhys left the club in late August, two months after signing his contract as the club was facing financial problems, the club's lack of professionalism and poor training methods.

=== Uthai Thani ===
On 27 August 2025, Harhys returned to Thailand after terminating his contract, and signed with Thai League 1 side Uthai Thani. He scored his first goal for the club in a 2–1 defeat to Rayong on 27 September. In a league match against Kanchanaburi Power on 19 October, Harhys assisted a goal with a cross towards Bruno Baio to equalise the game at 1–1. He ended the season with Uthai Thani scoring 2 goals and assisted 7 times in 31 appearances across all competition.

=== Return to Chiangrai United ===
On 22 July 2026, Harhys returned to Chiangrai United on his second spell at the club.

== International career ==
On 21 March 2024, Harhys made his debut for Singapore in the 2026 FIFA World Cup qualification match against China.

He scored his first international goal on 31 March 2026 against Bangladesh during the 2027 AFC Asian Cup qualification at the National Stadium. He scored his second in a 2–1 away win against Thailand in the 2026 ASEAN Championship Semi-finals second leg, helping Singapore secure their first competitive win over Thailand since 2012.

On 28 September 2026, Harhys secured Singapore first ever win in the inaugural 2026 FIFA ASEAN Cup scoring the only goal in a 1–0 win over Bangladesh in Jakarta.

== Personal life ==
Harhys was born in Singapore to a Welsh father and a Malay Singaporean mother. His older brother, Ryhan Stewart, is also a professional footballer who plays primarily as a right-back for Singapore Premier League club Lion City Sailors.

Harhys temporarily previously lived in the United Arab Emirates and Finland due to the nature of his father's job, before eventually returning to his home country of Singapore.

== Career statistics ==
=== Club ===
As of As of match played 20 Oct 2026

Club	Season	League			National Cup		League Cup		Continental		Total	
Club	Season	Division	Apps	Goals	Apps	Goals	Apps	Goals	Apps	Goals	Apps	Goals
Young Lions	2020	Singapore Premier League	11	0	0	0	0	0	0	0	11	0
Young Lions	2021	Singapore Premier League	17	2	0	0	0	0	0	0	17	2
Young Lions	2022	Singapore Premier League	16	0	3	0	0	0	0	0	19	0
Young Lions	2023	Singapore Premier League	21	3	4	0	0	0	0	0	25	3
Young Lions	Total		65	5	7	0	0	0	0	0	72	5
BG Pathum United	2023–24	Thai League 1	0	0	0	0	0	0	0	0	0	0
Chiangrai United	2023–24	Thai League 1	13	2	0	0	1	0	0	0	14	2
Chiangrai United	2024–25	Thai League 1	24	3	3	0	2	1	0	0	29	4
Chiangrai United	Total		37	5	3	0	3	1	0	0	43	6
Ferizaj	2025–26	Football Superleague of Kosovo	0	0	0	0	0	0	0	0	0	0
Uthai Thani	2025–26	Thai League 1	28	2	1	0	2	0	0	0	31	2
Chiangrai United	2026–27	Thai League 1	6	0	0	0	0	0	0	0	6	0
Career total			135	11	11	0	5	1	0	0	151	12

=== International ===
==== International goals ====
List of international goals scored by Harhys Stewart
No.	Date	Venue	Opponent	Score	Result	Competition
1.	31 March 2026	National Stadium, Kallang, Singapore	Bangladesh	1–0	1–0	2027 AFC Asian Cup qualification
2.	18 August 2026	Rajamangala Stadium, Bangkok, Thailand	Thailand	1–0	2–1	2026 ASEAN Championship
3.	28 September 2026	Gelora Bung Karno Stadium, Jakarta, Indonesia	Bangladesh	1–0	1–0	2026 FIFA ASEAN Cup

==== U23 International goals ====
No	Date	Venue	Opponent	Score	Result	Competition
1	14 May 2022	Thiên Trường Stadium, Nam Định, Vietnam	Malaysia	2–1	2–2 (draw)	2021 Southeast Asian Games
