= Jacob Mahler =

Singaporean footballer (born 2000)

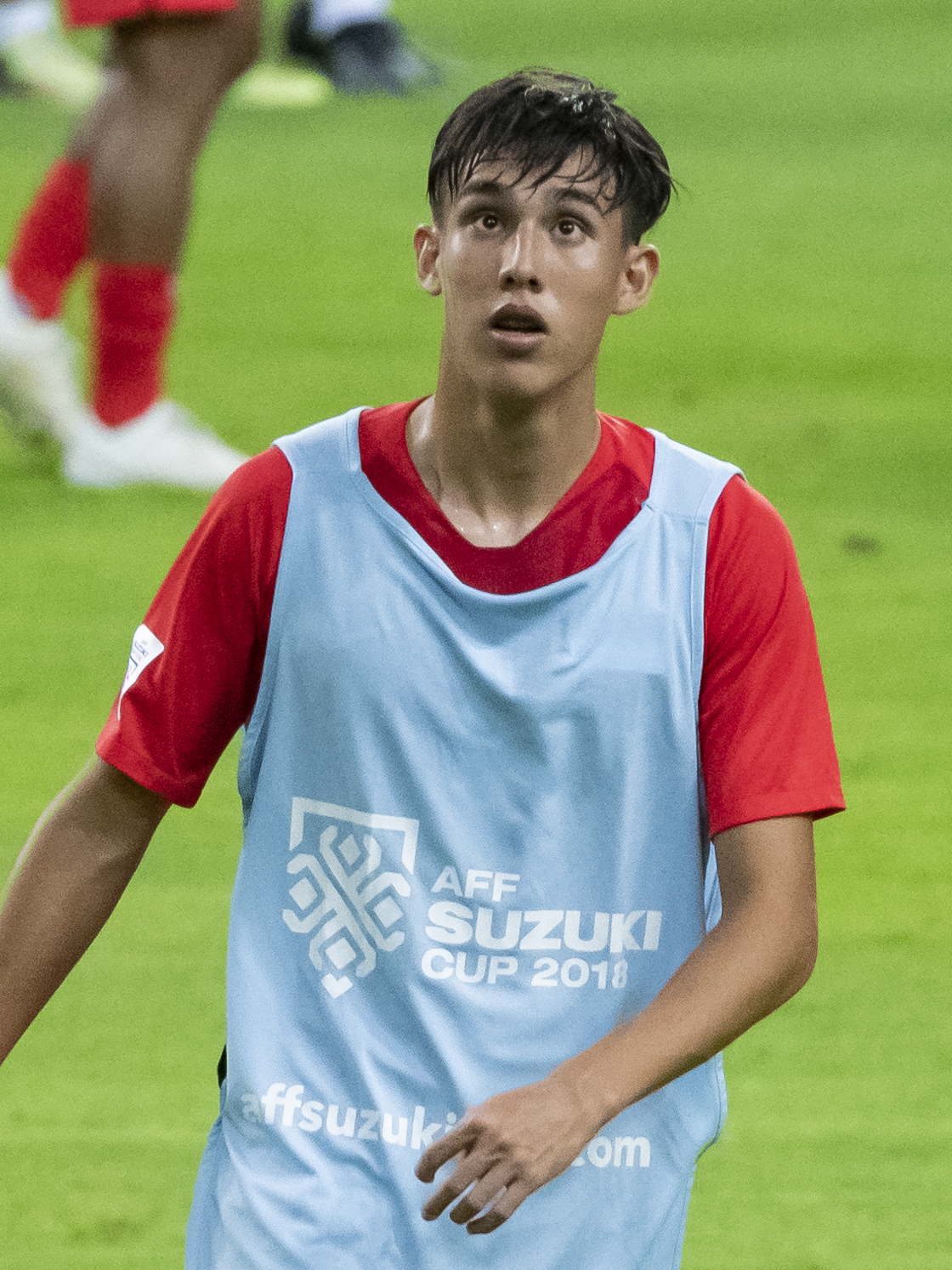
- Mahler warming up before a match in the 2018 AFF Championship tournament

Personal information
- Full name: Jacob William Mahler
- Date of birth: 10 April 2000 (age 26)
- Place of birth: Copenhagen, Denmark
- Height: 1.85 m (6 ft 1 in)
- Positions: Defensive midfielder; centre-back

Team information
- Current team: Tampines Rovers
- Number: 6

Youth career
- 2017: National Football Academy

Senior career*
Years	Team	Apps	(Gls)
2018–2023	Young Lions	73	(9)
2023–2024	Madura United	34	(1)
2024–2025	Muangthong United	2	(0)
2025–	Tampines Rovers	17	(3)

International career^{‡}
2015	Singapore U16	5	(1)
2017	Singapore U19	11	(2)
2018	Singapore U23	21	(1)
2018–	Singapore	15	(3)
Medal record
Men's football
Representing Singapore
Merlion Cup
Winner	2019 Singapore
- * Club domestic league appearances and goals as of 06:00, 17 June 2026 (UTC) ‡ National team caps and goals as of 18 November 2025

Jacob William Mahler (born 10 April 2000) is a professional footballer who plays either as a defensive midfielder or centre-back for Singapore Premier League club Tampines Rovers. Born in Denmark, he represents the Singapore national team.

== Club career ==
=== Young Lions ===
A youth product of the National Football Academy in Singapore, Mahler moved to Young Lions in 2018. Mahler made his professional debut for Young Lions in a 1–3 Singapore Premier League lost to Geylang International on 4 July 2018.

Mahler was named the club captain from the 2019 season onwards.

in the 2022 season, during a match against Tampines Rovers FC, Mahler suffered an anterior cruciate ligament (ACL) and meniscus tear which took him out for the rest of the year.

=== Madura United ===
On 19 May 2023, Mahler joined Indonesia Liga 1 club, Madura United becoming the 10th Singaporean to play in the Indonesian top-flight league. On 23 July 2023, Mahler scored his first goal for the club against Persis Solo coming from a set piece cross from Francisco Rivera. Mahler was named in three consecutive "Team of the Week" from gameweek 4 to gameweek 6.

=== Muangthong United ===
On 5 July 2024, Mahler moved to Thai League 1 club Muangthong United. On 25 August, he made his debut for the club in a 2–0 win over Ratchaburi. Mahler later sustained a more severe knee injury – ACL, Medial collateral ligament (MCL), and additional ligament damage – which required two surgeries. The injuries resulted in Mahler missing the entire season.

=== Tampines Rovers ===
On 29 June 2025, Mahler returned to Singapore to sign with Tampines Rovers.

During the 2026–27 ASEAN Club Championship match against Thailand club Ratchaburi on 18 November 2026, Mahler came on as a substitute for the injured Irfan Fandi. He later scored a stoppage time header to secure a 3–2 victory for Tampines Rovers.

== International career ==
Mahler made his professional debut for the Singapore national team in a friendly 2–0 win over Fiji on 11 September 2018. He scored his first goal for Singapore when he collected his second cap against Cambodia on 16 October 2018 in an eventual 1–2 win.

Mahler made his AFF Championship debut in the 2018 campaign on 9 November, with a 1–0 loss over Philippines.

In 2022, Mahler was named captain of the SEA Games Under-23 national football squad after he was called up the for 2021 SEA Games in Hanoi, Vietnam. He was later withdrawn from the team after he suffered an anterior cruciate ligament tear during his club's match in the 2022 season.

After a five years absence, on 8 September 2023, Mahler made his return to the senior squad in the starting line up against Tajikistan. On 12 October, Mahler scored his second international goal in a 2–1 win against Guam in the 2026 FIFA World Cup qualification.

On 21 March 2024, Mahler came on as a substitute and scored at the 81st minute to equalise the scoreline to 2–2 during a 2026 FIFA World Cup qualification match against China.

== Personal life ==
Mahler was born in Copenhagen, Denmark to a Danish father and Singaporean mother. His family moved to Jakarta, Indonesia due to his parents work but soon returned to Singapore when he was four.

He attended St. Joseph's Institution (SJI) before graduating from Temasek Polytechnic (TP) with a Diploma in Aerospace Electronics.

Mahler is a big fan of Manchester United and had cited that he used to emulate the playing style of his favourite player, Paul Scholes.

== Career statistics ==
=== Club ===
As of match played 15 September 2024

Club	Season	League		National Cup		League Cup		Continental		Total	
Club	Season	Apps	Goals	Apps	Goals	Apps	Goals	Apps	Goals	Apps	Goals
Young Lions	2017	2	0	0	0	0	0	—		2	0
Young Lions	2018	10	0	0	0	0	0	—		10	0
Young Lions	2019	24	3	0	0	0	0	—		24	3
Young Lions	2020	14	3	0	0	0	0	—		14	3
Young Lions	2021	12	3	0	0	0	0	—		12	3
Young Lions	2022	7	0	0	0	0	0	—		7	0
Young Lions	2023	4	0	0	0	0	0	—		4	0
Young Lions	Total	73	9	0	0	0	0	0	0	73	9
Madura United	2023–24	34	1	0	0	0	0	—		34	1
Madura United	Total	34	1	0	0	0	0	0	0	34	1
Muangthong United	2024–25	2	0	0	0	0	0	0	0	2	0
Muangthong United	Total	2	0	0	0	0	0	0	0	2	0
Tampines Rovers	2025–26	10	1	0	0	1	0	14 (Note: 9 in AFC Elite 2, 5 in Shopee Cup)	0	25	1
Tampines Rovers	Total	10	1	0	0	1	0	14	0	25	1
Career Total		118	11	0	0	1	0	14	0	133	11

=== International ===
Appearances and goals by national team and year
National team	Year	Apps	Goals
Singapore	2018	1	1
Singapore	2023	4	1
Singapore	2024	2	1
Total			3

Scores and results list Singapore's goal tally first.

List of international goals scored by Jacob Mahler
No.	Date	Venue	Opponent	Score	Result	Competition
1.	16 October 2018	Olympic Stadium, Phnom Penh, Cambodia	Cambodia	1–1	2–1	Friendly
2.	12 October 2023	National Stadium, Kallang, Singapore	Guam	2–0	2–1	2026 FIFA World Cup qualification
3.	21 March 2024	National Stadium, Kallang, Singapore	China	2–2	2–2	2026 FIFA World Cup qualification

== Honours ==
Madura United

- Liga 1 runner-up: 2023–24

Singapore U22

- Merlion Cup: 2019
