= Thiên Trường Stadium =

Stadium in Ninh Binh, Vietnam

Sân vận động Thiên Trường
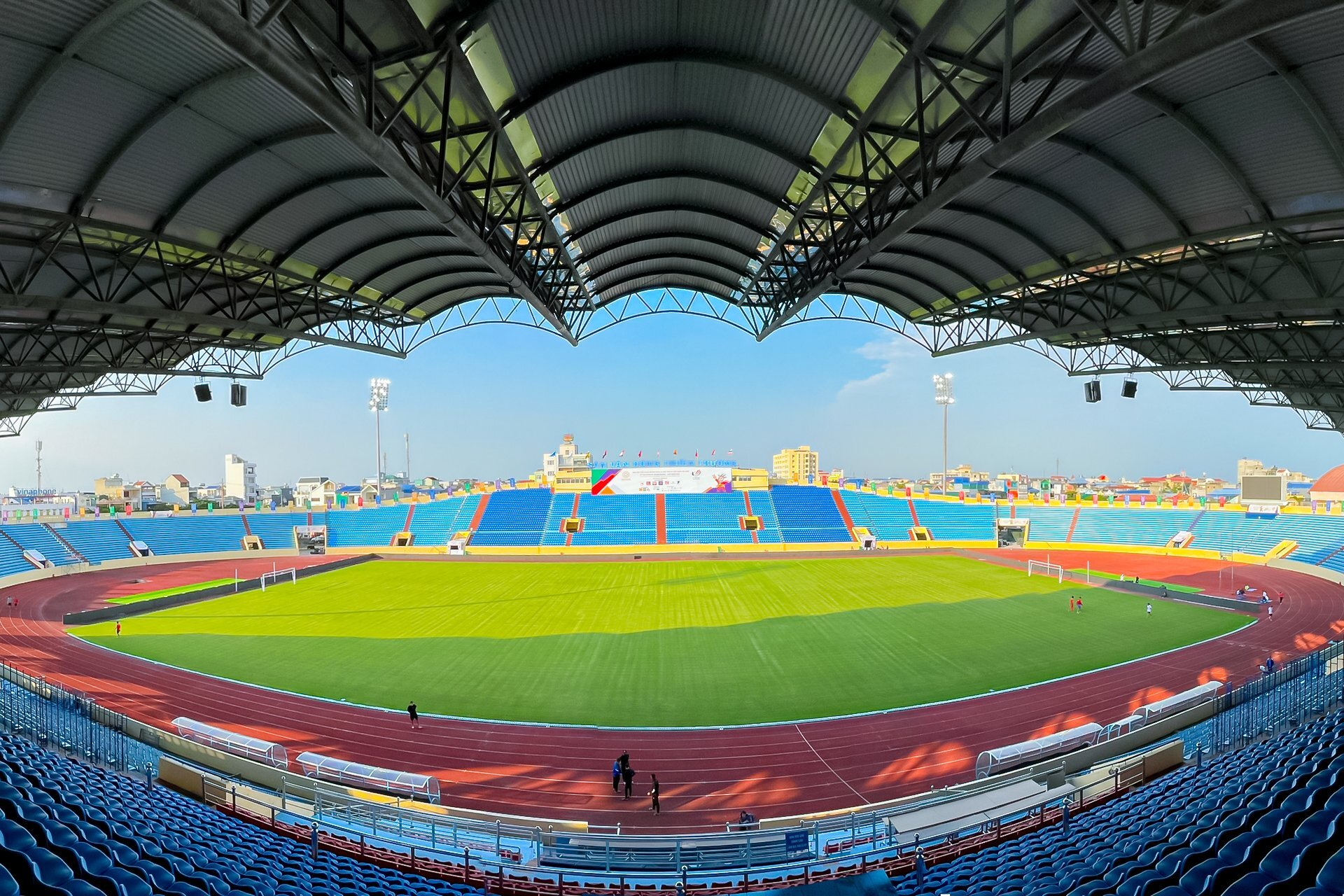
- Interactive map of Sân vận động Thiên Trường
- Location: Nam Định ward, Ninh Bình, Vietnam
- Coordinates: 20.4358°N 106.1800°E
- Capacity: 30,000
- Surface: Grass pitch

Tenants
- Nam Định; Vietnam national football team (Selected matches)

Thiên Trường Stadium (Vietnamese: Sân vận động Thiên Trường, literally Heaven's Place Stadium), previously known as Chùa Cuối Stadium (Last Temple Stadium), is a multi-use stadium in Nam Định ward, Ninh Bình, Vietnam. It is currently the home stadium of V.League 1 club Thép Xanh Nam Định.

It is also known among fans as "The Factory Weaves Wishes" (Nhà máy dệt giấc mơ), alluding to both Old Trafford's nickname "The Theatre of Dreams" and Nam Định's renowned textile plant.

== History ==
At the beginning, the Nam Dinh FC's home crisis was a dust and sandy training ground of the militia forces where were usually called as Sân Dệt or the "stadium" of the Namdinh Spinning Factory. It was old crisis of the Vietnamese National Army's military academy.

From the end of 1970s, their home crisis was Thiên Trường Stadium. During the Vietnam War, this stadium was only a big and polluted pond with some vegetable fields. Formerly Sân Chùa-Cuối or the "Pagoda at end of the street" Stadium from one uninhibited temple which has got some daoist icons.

It is currently used mostly for football matches and is the home stadium of Nam Định F.C. The stadium holds 30,000 people. Thiên Trường Stadium is located on Đặng Xuân Thiều street of Nam Định City opposite the provincial People's Committee of Nam Định Province. Nearby is Vị Hoàng lake, with a large natural grass field 115 metres by 72 metres, just behind the Mỹ Đình National Stadium. Sports experts have commented positively about beauty and artistic quality of this landscape work. Moreover, the stadium has been considered as "a factory weaves wishes" by the press. In 2003, Thiên Trường Stadium was one of many venues of the 2003 Southeast Asian Games, when it held the women's football matches. The national and Olympic football team have chosen Thiên Trường for many international matches.

The stadium has 20 gates and four levels: A, B, C and D. Levels A and B has seating for 7,000 people, while levels C and D each has 3,000 seats. There are four rooms for athletes, four rooms for the coach, three rooms for health care, VIP rooms, and cafeteria area. Grass on the field is of a pure, fine cultivar imported from Thailand, in accordance with the climate in Vietnam.

The whole project has investment budget (including additional) according to the Decision of the People's Committee of Nam Dinh province about VND 74 billion. Later, the settlement was about 70.5 billion VND. Thus, this is the only project that has not exceeded the approved investment budget.

== International football matches ==
Date	Competition	Team 1	Res.	Team 2
31 March 2004	2006 FIFA World Cup qualification – AFC second round	Vietnam	0–2	Lebanon
20 June 2023	Friendly	Vietnam	1–0	Syria
11 September 2023	Friendly	Vietnam	1–0	Palestine
12 October 2024	Friendly	Vietnam	1–1	India
31 March 2026	2027 AFC Asian Cup qualification – third round	Vietnam	3–1	Malaysia

== See also ==
- Thép Xanh Nam Định
