= 2023 DPMM FC season =

20th season in existence of DPMM FC

DPMM FC
2023 season
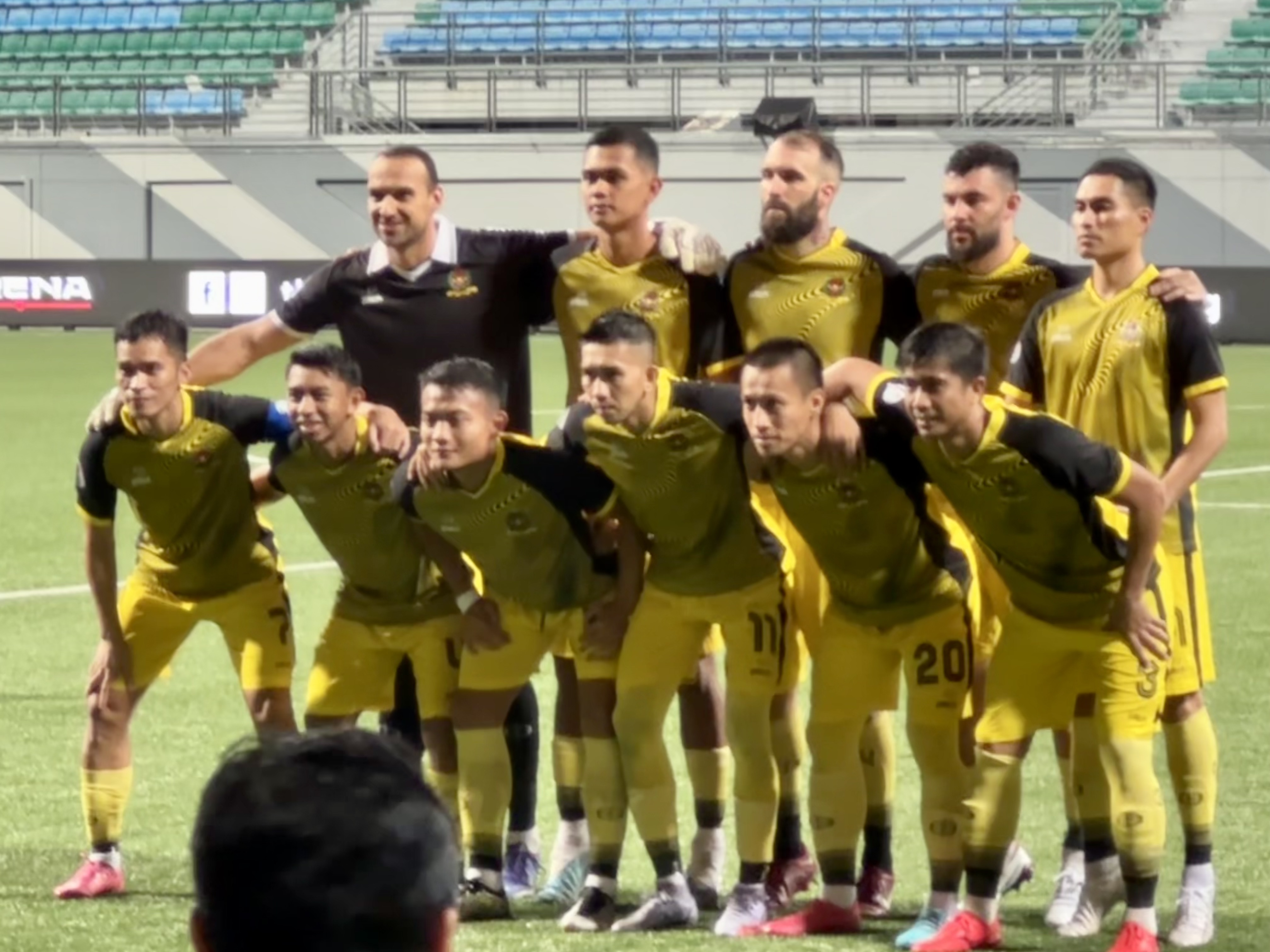
- Match between DPMM and Hougang United
- Chairman: HRH Prince Al-Muhtadee Billah
- Head coach: (England) Adrian Pennock
- Stadium: Hassanal Bolkiah National Stadium
Home colours	Away colours

The 2023 season was DPMM FC's 10th season in the top flight of Singaporean football, the Singapore Premier League. Along with the SGPL, the club also competed in the Singapore Cup as well as the 2023–24 AFC Cup via the qualifying play-offs, by virtue of winning the 2022 Brunei FA Cup last year.

== Squad ==
=== Singapore Premier League Squad ===
No.	Name	Nationality	Date of birth (age)	Previous club	Contract start	Contract end
Goalkeepers
1	Kristijan Naumovski	(North Macedonia)	17 September 1988 (age 37)	(North Macedonia) KF Shkupi	2023	2023
12	Haimie Abdullah Nyaring	(Brunei)	31 May 1998 (age 28)	(Brunei) Indera SC	2018	2023
25	Wardun Yussof ^{O30}	(Brunei)	14 September 1981 (age 44)	(Brunei) Majra FC	2006	2023
Defenders
2	Wafi Aminuddin ^{U23}	(Brunei)	20 September 2000 (age 25)	(Brunei) Tabuan Muda	2019	2023
3	Abdul Mu'iz Sisa ^{O30}	(Brunei)	20 April 1991 (age 35)	(Brunei) Indera SC	2016	2023
4	Hanif Farhan Azman ^{U23}	(Brunei)	2 November 2000 (age 25)	Youth	2020	2023
13	Hanif Hamir	(Brunei)	22 February 1997 (age 29)	(Brunei) Tabuan Muda	2017	2023
14	Helmi Zambin ^{O30}	(Brunei)	30 March 1987 (age 39)	(Brunei) Indera SC	2009	2023
19	Nur Ikhwan Othman	(Brunei)	15 January 1993 (age 33)	(Brunei) Indera SC	2016	2023
20	Fakharrazi Hassan ^{O30}	(Brunei)	15 July 1989 (age 37)	Brunei DPMM II	2018	2023
21	Hirzi Zulfaqar Mahzan ^{U23}	(Brunei)	13 August 2000 (age 25)	(Brunei) Indera SC	2023	2023
23	Yura Indera Putera Yunos	(Brunei)	25 March 1996 (age 30)	(Brunei) Majra FC	2015	2023
24	Ángel Martínez	(Spain)	17 May 1991 (age 35)	(Greece) PAS Lamia 1964	2023	2023
Midfielders
5	Farshad Noor	(Afghanistan) (Netherlands)	2 October 1994 (age 31)	(India) Gokulam Kerala FC	2023	2023
6	Azwan Saleh ^{O30}	(Brunei)	1 June 1988 (age 38)	(Brunei) Indera SC	2006	2023
7	Azwan Ali Rahman ^{O30}	(Brunei)	11 January 1992 (age 34)	(Brunei) Indera SC	2013	2023
8	Hendra Azam Idris ^{O30}	(Brunei)	10 August 1988 (age 37)	(Brunei) QAF FC	2012	2023
11	Najib Tarif ^{O30}	(Brunei)	5 February 1988 (age 38)	(Brunei) Indera SC	2012	2023
15	Syafiq Hilmi Shahrom ^{U23}	(Brunei)	3 April 2006 (age 20)	Youth	2023	2023
16	Eddy Shahrol Omar ^{U23}	(Brunei)	4 October 2003 (age 22)	(Brunei) Kasuka FC	2023	2023
Strikers
9	Abdul Azizi Ali Rahman ^{O30}	(Brunei)	17 January 1987 (age 39)	(Brunei) MS ABDB	2018	2023
10	Andrey Varankow	(Belarus)	8 February 1989 (age 37)	(Belarus) FC Gorodeya	2019	2023
17	Hakeme Yazid Said ^{U23}	(Brunei)	8 February 2003 (age 23)	Youth	2019	2023
18	Razimie Ramlli ^{O30}	(Brunei)	6 August 1990 (age 35)	(Brunei) MS ABDB	2019	2023
22	Nazirrudin Ismail	(Brunei)	27 December 1998 (age 27)	(Brunei) MS PPDB	2023	2023
Players who left during season
1	Akmal Tursunbaev	(Uzbekistan)	14 April 1993 (age 33)	(Uzbekistan) FK Turon Yaypan	2023	2023
5	Josip Balić	(Croatia)	8 July 1993 (age 33)	(Bosnia and Herzegovina) FK Sloboda Tuzla	2023	2023

=== Under-20 Squad ===
The DPMM FC U20 squad compete in the 2023 Brunei Under-20 Youth League.

Note: Flags indicate national team as defined under FIFA eligibility rules; some limited exceptions apply. Players may hold more than one non-FIFA nationality.

No.	Pos.	Nation	Player
1	GK	BRU	Khairul Hisyam Norihwan
2	DF	BRU	Danial Hakimi Rosmadi
3	DF	BRU	Adrian Zikry Nur Khairi
4	DF	BRU	Danish Firdaus Roddy Suhardi
5	MF	BRU	Raziq Saiful Faisal
6	DF	BRU	Irfan Chin Ikhwan Chin
7	DF	BRU	Arin Danial Yusra
8	MF	BRU	Safwan Zawawi Sazalee
9	MF	BRU	Adrian Zizry Nur Khairi
10	FW	BRU	Zarif Muzaffar Abdulhana Rizal
11	FW	BRU	Hadi Aiman Hamizal
13	DF	BRU	Hafiz Azizie Abdullah

No.	Pos.	Nation	Player
14	MF	BRU	Prince Abdul Haseeb Abdul Rahim
15	MF	BRU	Faris Fadillah Saiful Bahari
17	FW	BRU	Prince Abdul Muntaqim Al-Muhtadee Billah
18	GK	BRU	Abdul Mudzil Ahmad Saufi
19	MF	BRU	Adam Bakri
20	MF	BRU	Aqram Waqeel Bakri
21	FW	BRU	Akmal Rizal Abu Bakar
22	DF	BRU	Mahmud Khalish Zaifulizham
23	FW	BRU	Abdul Muta'ali Haziq Hamidullah Abdul 'Ali Yil-Kabier
24	DF	BRU	Farrish Ballkid Karami Karamilahi
25	GK	BRU	Waie Haziq Wardun

== Coaching staff ==
=== First-team squad ===
Position	Name	Ref.
Head Coach	(England) Adrian Pennock	
Assistant Coach	(Brunei) Moksen Mohammad	
Goalkeeping Coach	(Brazil) Jorge Ferreira Barbosa	
Fitness Coach	(England) Jason Moriarty (Brunei) Rosmin Kamis	
Team Manager	(Brunei) Mohammad Ali bin Hj Momin	
Physiotherapist	(Brunei) Faisal Hashim (Brunei) Masri Tahir	
Kitman	(Brunei) Kasim Amit	

=== Under-20 squad ===
Position	Name	Ref.
Head Coach	(Brunei) Helme Panjang	
Assistant Coach	(Brunei) Subhi Abdilah Bakir (Brunei) Mahdini Mohammad	
Goalkeeping Coach	(Brunei) Julaihi Domeng	
Team Manager	(Brunei) Momin Jaafar (Brunei) Saharul Nizam Tuah	
Physiotherapist	(Brunei) Noorman Abdul Rahman	
Kitman	(Brunei) Abdul Hafiz Mursadi	

== Transfers ==
=== Transfers ===
==== In ====
Pre-Season transfers

Position	Player	Transferred from	Team	Ref
GK	(Uzbekistan) Akmal Tursunbaev	(Uzbekistan) FK Turon Yaypan	First team	Free
DF	(Spain) Ángel Martínez	(Greece) PAS Lamia 1964	First team	Free
DF	(Brunei) Hirzi Zulfaqar Mahzan	(Brunei) Indera SC	First team	Free
MF	(Brunei) Eddy Shahrol Omar	(Brunei) Kasuka FC	First team	Free
MF	(Croatia) Josip Balić	(Bosnia and Herzegovina) FK Sloboda Tuzla	First team	Free
FW	(Belarus) Andrey Varankow	Free Agent	First team	Free
FW	(Brunei) Nazirrudin Ismail	(Brunei) MS PPDB	First team	Free

Mid-Season Transfers

Position	Player	Transferred from	Team	Ref
GK	(North Macedonia) Kristijan Naumovski	(North Macedonia) KF Shkupi	First team	
MF	(Afghanistan) (Netherlands) Farshad Noor	(India) Gokulam Kerala	First team	

==== Out ====
Pre-Season transfers

Position	Player	Transferred To	Team	Ref
GK	(Brunei) Riyan Aiman Jali	(Brunei) Kota Ranger FC	First team	
DF	(Brunei) Hazwan Hamzah	(Brunei) Kasuka FC	First team	
DF	(Brunei) Abdul Aziz Tamit	(Brunei) Kasuka FC	First team	
DF	(Brunei) Wafiq Danish Hasimulabdillah	(Brunei) Kasuka FC	First team	
MF	(Brunei) Danisyh Syariee Masrazni	(Brunei) Kasuka FC	First team	
MF	(Brunei) Nur Asyraffahmi Norsamri	(Brunei) Kasuka FC	First team	
FW	(Brunei) Shah Razen Said	(Brunei) Kasuka FC	First team	

Mid-Season Transfers

Position	Player	Transferred To	Team	Ref
GK	(Uzbekistan) Akmal Tursunbaev	(Uzbekistan) FC Buxoro	First team	Free
MF	(Croatia) Josip Balić		First team	Free
FW	(Belarus) Andrey Varankow		First team	Free

==== Extension / Retained ====
Position	Player	Ref

==== Trial ====
Position	Player	Club	Ref
GK	(Liberia) Sekou Bayoh	(Liberia) Invincible Eleven	
GK	(Ghana) (Liberia) Richard Baidoo	(Ghana) FC Samartex	
FW	(Spain) Sergio Mendigutxia	(India) Gokulam Kerala	

== Friendly ==
=== Pre-season friendly ===
Win Draw Loss

1 February 2023	Nakhon Pathom (Thailand)	3–0	(Brunei) DPMM	Nakhon Pathom
	Photanorm 21'; Martínez 37' (o.g.); Suksanguan 82'	Full match		Stadium: Nakhon Pathom Municipality Sport School Stadium

6 February 2023	Chonburi (Thailand)	2–0	(Brunei) DPMM	Chonburi
				Stadium: Chonburi Stadium

18 February 2023	DPMM (Brunei)	v	(Brunei) MS ABDB	Jerudong
16:00 UTC+8				Stadium: Jerudong Park Mini Stadium

24 February 2023	DPMM (Brunei)	v	(Brunei) MS PPDB	Jerudong
16:00 UTC+8				Stadium: Jerudong Park Mini Stadium

25 February 2023	DPMM (Brunei)	3–0	(Brunei) Kasuka FC	Jerudong
16:00 UTC+8				Stadium: Jerudong Park Mini Stadium

== Team statistics ==
=== Appearances and goals ===
As of 12 Dec

No.	Pos.	Player	SGPL		Singapore Cup		AFC Cup		Total	
No.	Pos.	Player	Apps.	Goals	Apps.	Goals	Apps.	Goals	Apps.	Goals
1	GK	(North Macedonia) Kristijan Naumovski	10	0	7	0	1	0	18	0
2	DF	(Brunei) Wafi Aminuddin	2+1	0	0	0	0	0	3	0
3	DF	(Brunei) Abdul Mu'iz Sisa	7+9	0	3+2	0	0+1	0	22	0
4	MF	(Brunei) Hanif Farhan Azman	21+2	1	7	1	1	0	31	2
5	MF	(Afghanistan) (Netherlands) Farshad Noor	11	2	7	3	0+1	1	19	6
6	MF	(Brunei) Azwan Saleh	1+4	0	1+3	0	0	0	9	0
7	MF	(Brunei) Azwan Ali Rahman	18	4	4	1	1	0	24	5
8	MF	(Brunei) Hendra Azam Idris	8+7	0	6	0	1	0	22	0
9	FW	(Brunei) Abdul Azizi Ali Rahman	8+10	2	1+3	0	1	0	23	2
10	FW	(Belarus) Andrey Voronkov	19+1	9	4	1	0	0	24	10
11	MF	(Brunei) Najib Tarif	23	0	4	0	1	0	28	0
12	GK	(Brunei) Haimie Abdullah Nyaring	8	0	0	0	0	0	8	0
13	DF	(Brunei) Hanif Hamir	16+5	1	6	0	1	0	28	1
14	DF	(Brunei) Helmi Zambin	12+5	0	1+3	0	1	0	22	0
15	MF	(Brunei) Syafiq Hilmi Shahrom	2+9	0	1+2	0	0	0	14	0
16	MF	(Brunei) Eddy Shahrol Omar	0+5	0	0+3	0	0	0	8	0
17	FW	(Brunei) Hakeme Yazid Said	22	12	7	1	1	0	30	13
18	FW	(Brunei) Razimie Ramlli	3+14	0	1+3	0	0+1	0	22	0
19	MF	(Brunei) Nur Ikhwan Othman	0	0	0	0	0	0	0	0
20	DF	(Brunei) Fakharrazi Hassan	10+12	0	1+1	0	1	0	25	0
21	DF	(Brunei) Hirzi Zulfaqar Mahzan	4+3	0	1	0	0	0	8	0
22	MF	(Brunei) Nazirrudin Ismail	5+9	3	1+4	0	0+1	0	20	3
23	DF	(Brunei) Yura Indera Putera Yunos	19	1	7	0	1	0	27	1
24	DF	(Spain) Ángel Martínez	20	2	7	0	0	0	27	2
25	GK	(Brunei) Wardun Yussof	0	0	0	0	0	0	0	0
Players who have played this season but had left the club or on loan to other club
1	GK	(Uzbekistan) Akmal Tursunbaev	6	0	0	0	0	0	6	0
5	DF	(Croatia) Josip Balić	10+1	2	0	0	0	0	11	2

== Competitions ==
=== Overview ===
Competition	Record							
Competition	P	W	D	L	GF	GA	GD	Win %

=== Singapore Premier League ===
Win Draw Loss

3 March 2023 1	Lion City Sailors (Singapore)	3–1	(Brunei) DPMM FC	Bishan
	Lestienne 45+2'; Tanaka 75'; Abdul Rasaq 90+5'; Mamadou (yellow card) 42'; Hafiz Nor (yellow card) 70' van Huizen (yellow card) 80'	Report	Hakeme 62'; Hanif H. (yellow card) 43'	Stadium: Bishan Stadium; Referee: Mohd Taqi

10 March 2023 2	DPMM FC (Brunei)	3–4	(Singapore) Balestier Khalsa	Jalan Besar
	Voronkov 5'; Azwan A. 7' (yellow card) 80'; Ho 45+2' (o.g.); Hendra (yellow card) 35'; Hanif H. (yellow card) 41'; Yura (red card) 55'; Balić (yellow card) 64'; Syafiq (yellow card) 82'; Najib (yellow card) 86'; Hanif F. (yellow card) 90+8'	Report	Taniguchi 18', 64', 90+10'; Kozar 55' (pen.) (yellow card) 79'; Ho (yellow card) 27'	Stadium: Jalan Besar Stadium (Note: Hassanal Bolkiah National Stadium unavailable due to ongoing renovations.); Referee: Jansen Foo

14 March 2023 3	DPMM FC (Brunei)	2–1	(Singapore) Tanjong Pagar United	Jalan Besar
	Voronkov 55'; Hanif H. 78'	Report	Hirzi 28' (o.g.); Raihan (red card) 56'; Tajeli (yellow card) 85'; Shakir (yellow card) 90+6'	Stadium: Jalan Besar Stadium; Referee: Ahmad A'qashah

19 March 2023 4	DPMM FC (Brunei)	1–3	(Singapore) Geylang International	Jalan Besar
	Azizi 61'; Azwan A. (yellow card) 33'; Mu'iz (yellow card) 53'	Report	Naufal 5' (yellow card) 71'; Yamaya 55' (pen.), 66'; Akmal (yellow card) 44'	Stadium: Jalan Besar Stadium; Referee: Mohd Taqi

31 March 2023 5	Hougang United (Singapore)	0–3	(Brunei) DPMM FC	Jalan Besar
	Zulfahmi (yellow card) 69'; Nazrul (yellow card) 85'; Amir (yellow card) 87'; Fairoz (yellow card) 90+6'; Amy Recha (yellow card) 90+7'	Report	Hakeme 31' (yellow card) 17'; Yura 48' (yellow card) 45'; Balić 88'; Hanif H. (yellow card) 74'; Martínez (yellow card) 86'; Hanif F. (yellow card) 90+3'	Stadium: Jalan Besar Stadium; Referee: Farhad Mohamed

11 April 2023 6	Young Lions FC (Singapore)	2–2	(Brunei) DPMM FC	Jalan Besar
	Teo 87'; Emaviwe 89'; Stewart (yellow card) 60'	Report	Martínez 45+3'; Voronkov 81'	Stadium: Jalan Besar Stadium; Referee: Taufik Thana

15 April 2023 7	Albirex Niigata (S) (Japan)	2–0	(Brunei) DPMM FC	Jurong East
	Fukashiro 54'; Komatsu 81'; Komaki (yellow card) 32'; Fuwa (yellow card) 83'	Report	Azizi (yellow card) 30'	Stadium: Jurong East Stadium; Referee: Clarence Leow Hong Wei

20 April 2023 8	Tampines Rovers (Singapore)	2–0	(Brunei) DPMM FC	Jalan Besar
	Ong 8'; Yasir 10'; Nakamura (yellow card) 31'	Report	Voronkov (penalty missed) 90'; Martínez (yellow card) 13'; Hanif Farhan (yellow card) 31'	Stadium: Jalan Besar Stadium (Note: Our Tampines Hub not available due to unplayable field); Referee: Farhad Mohamed

7 May 2023 9 (Rescheduled)	DPMM FC (Brunei)	2–1	(Singapore) Tanjong Pagar United	Jalan Besar
	Voronkov (penalty missed) 34' 34'; Hakeme 84'; Farhan (yellow card) 29'; Hirzi (yellow card) 69' (yellow-red card) 89'; Tursunbaev (yellow card) 90+7'	Report	Mudražija 67'; Naufal Ilham (yellow card) 29'; Pedro Dias (red card) 31'	Stadium: Jalan Besar Stadium; Referee: Andrea Verolino

13 May 2023 10	DPMM FC (Brunei)	3–3	(Singapore) Lion City Sailors	Jalan Besar
	Voronkov 4', 30', 89'; Yura (yellow card) 38'; Hakeme (yellow card) 70'; Mu'iz (yellow card) 72'; Azwan A. (yellow card) 76'; Hanif (yellow card) 81'	Report	Diego Lopes 15'; Lestienne 19', 45'; Nur Adam (yellow card) 41'; Hami Syahin (yellow card) 90+3'	Stadium: Jalan Besar Stadium; Referee: Ahmad A'qashah

20 May 2023 11	Balestier Khalsa (Singapore)	3–2	(Brunei) DPMM FC	Toa Payoh
	Hoshino 30' (yellow card) 52'; Goh 49' (yellow card) 36'; Sugita 55'; Amer Hakeem (yellow card) 8'	Report	Hakeme 46', 71'; Farhan (yellow card) 38'; Martínez (yellow card) 75'; Yura (yellow card) 90+1'	Stadium: Toa Payoh Stadium; Referee: Mohd Taqi

28 May 2023 12 (Rescheduled)	DPMM FC (Brunei)	0–1	(Singapore) Tampines Rovers	Jalan Besar
	Martínez (yellow card) 5' (yellow-red card) 14'; Azwan A. (yellow card) 10'; Azizi (yellow card) 14'; Fakharrazi (yellow card) 36'	Report	Kopitović 55'; Yamashita (yellow card) 14'; Firdaus (yellow card) 85'	Stadium: Jalan Besar Stadium; Referee: Jansen Foo

7 June 2023 13	DPMM FC (Brunei)	2–3	(Singapore) Hougang United	Jalan Besar
	Hakeme 84', 90+4' (pen.); Syafiq (yellow card) 51'; Hendra (yellow card) 86'; Eddy (yellow card) 90+6'	Report	Amy Recha 33', 40', 53'; Zulfahmi (yellow card) 85'	Stadium: Jalan Besar Stadium; Referee: Farhad Mohamed

11 June 2023 14	DPMM FC (Brunei)	0–2	(Japan) Albirex Niigata (S)	Jalan Besar
	Hanif H. (red card) 88'; Helmi (yellow card) 90+5'	Report	Lee 41'; Yokoyama 46'; Kunori (penalty missed) 89'; Hariya (yellow card) 77'	Stadium: Jalan Besar Stadium; Referee: Ahmad A'qashah

24 June 2023 15	DPMM FC (Brunei)	6–0	(Singapore) Young Lions FC	Jalan Besar
	Azwan A. 2'; Voronkov 6', 50'; Noor 39' (pen.); Farhan 48'; Hakeme 66'; Fakharrazi (yellow card) 45+1'; Syafiq (yellow card) 87'	Report	Harith (yellow card) 45+2'; Ryu Hardy (yellow card) 80'; Syafi'ie (yellow card) 81'	Stadium: Jalan Besar Stadium; Referee: Jansen Foo

28 June 2023 16	Geylang International (Singapore)	2–0	(Brunei) DPMM FC	Tampines
	Bezencourt 25'; Iqbal 51'; Yamaya (penalty missed) 58'; Low (yellow card) 43'; Arshad (yellow card) 51'; Hafiz (yellow card) 90+7'	Report	Naumovski (yellow card) 17'; Noor (yellow card) 47'	Stadium: Our Tampines Hub; Referee: Hilmi Faud

8 July 2023 17 (Rescheduled)	DPMM FC (Brunei)	1–1	(Japan) Albirex Niigata (S)	Jalan Besar
	Azizi 30'; Hakeme (yellow card) 75'; Naumovski (yellow card) 90+2'; Noor (yellow card) 90+5'	Report	Komatsu 50'; Kishimoto (yellow card) 90+2'	Stadium: Jalan Besar Stadium; Referee: Taufik Thana

11 July 2023 18	Lion City Sailors (Singapore)	1–3	(Brunei) DPMM FC	Bishan
	Adam 52'; Lestienne (penalty missed) 45+8'; Wright (red card) 32'	Report	Azwan A. 9'; Hakeme 34'; Martínez 64'; Noor (yellow card) 45+3'	Stadium: Bishan Stadium; Referee: Jansen Foo

16 July 2023 19	DPMM FC (Brunei)	2–3	(Singapore) Balestier Khalsa	Jalan Besar
	Azwan A. 7'; Hakeme 17'; Farhan (yellow card) 32'; Yura (yellow card) 72' (red card) 90'; Najib (yellow card) 88'; Hendra (yellow card) 90+3'	Report	Hoshino 2'; Taniguchi 32' (pen.), 88' (penalty missed) 87'; Fudhil (yellow card) 64'	Stadium: Jalan Besar Stadium; Referee: Hilmi Fuad

28 July 2023 20 (Rescheduled)	DPMM FC (Brunei)	1–2	(Singapore) Geylang International	Jalan Besar
	Hakeme (penalty missed) 35' 84'; Nazirrudin (yellow card) 85'	Report	Low 20'; Naufal 48'; Adli (yellow card) 30' (yellow-red card) 90+2'; Arshad (yellow card) 73'	Stadium: Jalan Besar Stadium; Referee: Clarence Leow

4 August 2023 21	Hougang United (Singapore)	1–0	(Brunei) DPMM FC	Jalan Besar
	Maksimovic 74'	Report	Noor (yellow card) 34'; Hanif (yellow card) 69'	Stadium: Jalan Besar Stadium; Referee: Andrea Verolino

12 August 2023 22	Young Lions FC (Singapore)	0–2	(Brunei) DPMM FC	Jalan Besar
	Syafi'ie (yellow card) 80'	Report	Nazirrudin 67', 90+4'; Azwan A. (yellow card) 87'; Naumovski (yellow card) 90+3'	Stadium: Jalan Besar Stadium; Referee: Taufik Thana

18 August 2023 23	Tampines Rovers (Singapore)	2–2	(Brunei) DPMM FC	Tampines
	Kopitović 19'; Saifullah Akbar 71'; Kweh (yellow card) 79'; Shah (yellow card) 86'; Faris Ramli (yellow card) 90+6'	Report	Noor 56'; Nazirrudin 74'; Hendra (yellow card) 90'	Stadium: Our Tampines Hub; Referee: Clarence Leow Hong Wei

15 September 2023 24 (Rescheduled)	Tanjong Pagar United (Singapore)	1–1	(Brunei) DPMM FC	Jurong East
	Mudražija 55'; Kenji (red card) 11'; Pedro Dias (yellow card) 18'	Report	Hakeme 45'; Noor (yellow card) 78'	Stadium: Jurong East Stadium; Referee: Taufik Thana

Pos	Team	Pld	W	D	L	GF	GA	GD	Pts	Qualification or relegation
1	Albirex Niigata (S) (Note: Three clubs – Albirex Niigata (S), DPMM FC and the FAS under-23 team Young Lions, are ineligible for any AFC competition spots.) (C)	24	20	2	2	86	20	+66	62	
2	Lion City Sailors (Q)	24	17	3	4	79	39	+40	54	Qualification for 2024-25 AFC Champions League Two Group Stage & ASEAN Club Championship
3	Tampines Rovers (Q)	24	14	6	4	47	32	+15	48	Qualification for 2024-25 AFC Champions League Two Group Stage
4	Balestier Khalsa	24	12	0	12	60	71	−11	36	
5	Geylang International	24	10	3	11	41	52	−11	33	
6	Hougang United	24	9	2	13	37	57	−20	29	
7	Brunei DPMM	24	6	5	13	39	43	−4	23	
8	Tanjong Pagar United	24	6	3	15	39	62	−23	21	
9	Young Lions	24	1	2	21	24	76	−52	5	

Source: Singapore Premier League
Rules for classification: 1) points; 2) goal difference; 3) number of goals scored; 4) number of wins
(C) Champions; (Q) Qualified for the phase indicated

=== Singapore Cup ===
Pos	Team	Pld	W	D	L	GF	GA	GD	Pts	Qualification
1	Brunei DPMM (Q)	4	3	1	0	7	2	+5	10	Semi-finals
2	Tampines Rovers (Q)	4	2	1	1	9	3	+6	7	Semi-finals
3	Albirex Niigata (S)	4	1	2	1	5	4	+1	5	
4	Geylang International	4	1	0	3	6	12	−6	3	
5	Young Lions	4	1	0	3	4	10	−6	3	

Updated to match(es) played on 29 September 2023. Source: FAS
(Q) Qualified for the phase indicated

Win Draw Loss

24 September 2023 Group Match 1	Brunei DPMM	1–1	(Japan) Albirex Niigata (S)	Jalan Besar
	Azwan A. 13'; Ángel (yellow card) 33'	Report	Kunori 57'	Stadium: Jalan Besar Stadium; Referee: Mohd Taqi

29 September 2023 Group Match 2	Brunei DPMM	1–0	(Singapore) Tampines Rovers	Jalan Besar
	Noor 63' (pen.) (yellow card) 83'; Hanif H. (yellow card) 68'; Naumovski (yellow card) 90+2'	Report	Yasir (yellow card) 17'; Zlatković (yellow card) 54'; Mustafić (yellow card) 89'	Stadium: Jalan Besar Stadium; Referee: Ahmad A'qashah

22 October 2023 Group Match 3	Geylang International (Singapore)	1–4	Brunei DPMM	Tampines
	Iqbal Hussain 9' (pen.); Yamaya (yellow card) 62'; Naufal (red card) 64'; Leonard Koh (yellow card) 65'	Report	Hakeme 23'; Noor 38'; Voronkov 43'; Hanif Farhan 68'; Azwan A. (yellow card) 62'	Stadium: Our Tampines Hub; Referee: Andrea Verolino

4 November 2023 Group Match 4	Young Lions FC (Singapore)	0–1	Brunei DPMM	Jalan Besar
	Sahffee Jubpre (red card) 90+2'; Farhan Zulkifli (penalty missed) 87	Report	Farshad Noor 34'; Hanif Hamir (yellow card) 83'	Stadium: Jalan Besar Stadium; Referee: Clarence Leow Hong Wei

3 December 2023 Semi Final Leg 1	Hougang United (Singapore)	1–0	(Brunei) DPMM FC	Jalan Besar
	Maksimovic 58'; Hazzuwan (yellow card) 45+2'; Ajay (yellow card) 69'; Tan (yellow card) 84'; Takayama (yellow card) 86'	Report	Noor (yellow card) 56'	Stadium: Jalan Besar Stadium; Referee: Jansen Foo

6 December 2023 Semi Final Leg 2	DPMM FC (Brunei)	0-2	(Singapore) Hougang United	Jalan Besar
	Azwan Saleh (yellow card) 40'; Kristijan Naumovski (yellow card) 51'; Najib Tarif (yellow card) 55'	Report	Djordje Maksimovic 41', 83'; Naoki Kuriyama (yellow card) 69'	Stadium: Jalan Besar Stadium; Referee: Ahmad A'qashah

Hougang won 3–0 on aggregate.

9 December 2023 3rd/4th	Brunei DPMM	0-2	(Singapore) Tampines Rovers	Jalan Besar
	Hakeme Yazid Said (yellow card) 60' (yellow-red card) 88'; Abdul Azizi Ali Rahman (yellow card) 81'	Report	Boris Kopitović 10'; Faris Ramli 31'	Stadium: Jalan Besar Stadium; Referee: Clarence Leow Hong Wei

=== AFC Cup ===
Win Draw Loss

16 August 2023 AFC Cup ASEAN Zone Qualifying Preliminary Round 1	Yangon United (Myanmar)	2–1	(Brunei) DPMM FC	Yangon, Myanmar
	Valencia 79'; Zaw Win Thein 90'	Report	Noor 78'	Stadium: Thuwunna Stadium; Attendance: 4,785; Referee: Seyed Vahid Kazemi (Iran)
