= Syafiq Hilmi Shahrom =

Bruneian footballer

Syafiq Hilmi
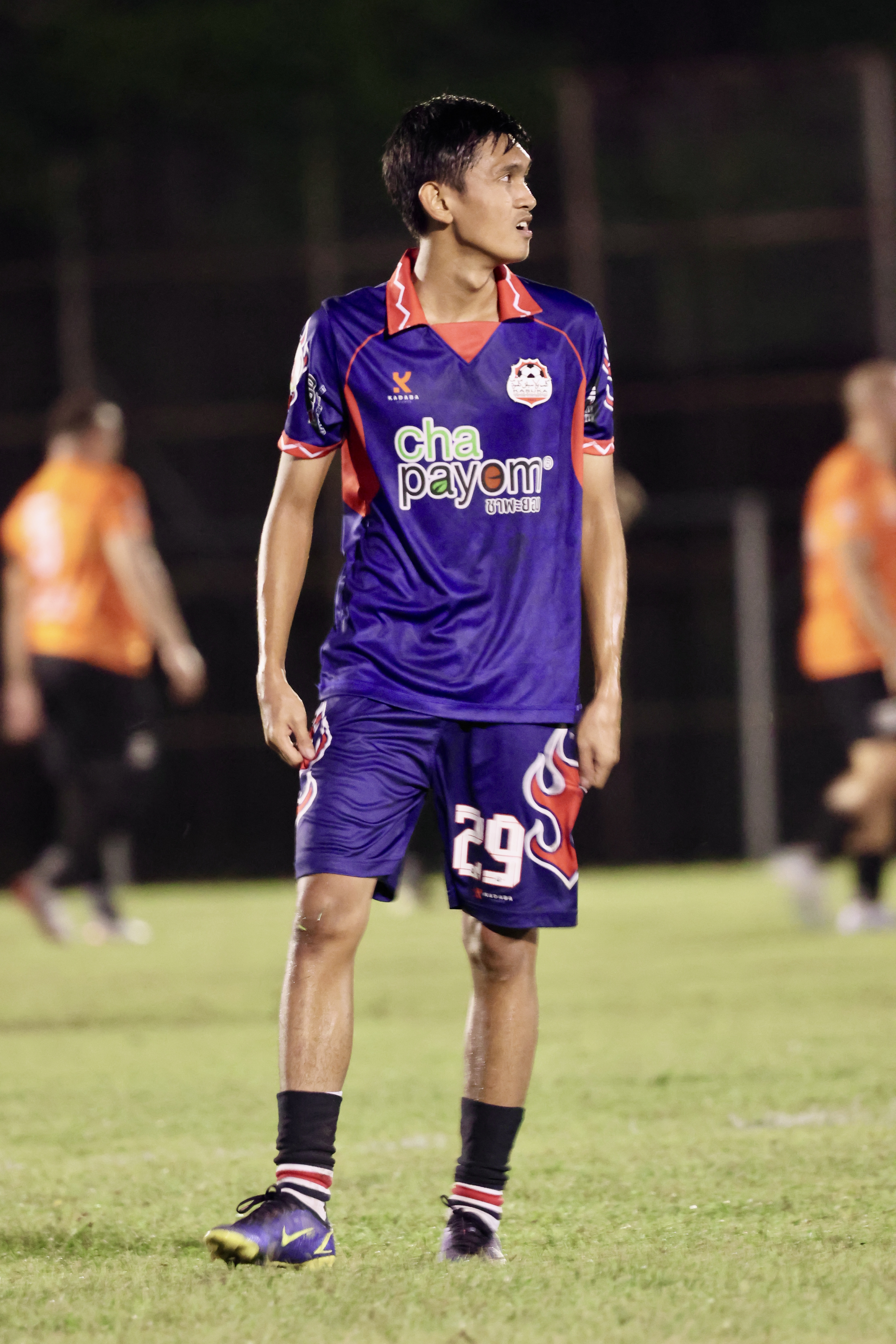
- Syafiq with Kasuka in 2024

Personal information
- Full name: Awangku Mohammad Syafiq Hilmi bin Pengiran Mohammad Shahrom
- Date of birth: 3 April 2006 (age 20)
- Place of birth: Brunei
- Height: 1.71 m (5 ft 7 in)
- Position: Midfielder

Team information
- Current team: Kasuka FC
- Number: 22

Youth career
- 2017–2018: Dash FA
- 2019–2024: DPMM

Senior career*
Years	Team	Apps	(Gls)
2023–2024	DPMM	11	(0)
2024–	Kasuka	22	(6)

International career^{‡}
2022	Brunei U17	5	(0)
2022	Brunei U19	1	(0)
2025–	Brunei U23	3	(0)
- * Club domestic league appearances and goals as of 8 November 2026 ‡ National team caps and goals as of 19 July 2025

Awangku Mohammad Syafiq Hilmi bin Pengiran Mohammad Shahrom (born 3 April 2006) is a Bruneian footballer who plays as a midfielder for Kasuka FC of the Brunei Super League.

== Club career ==
=== Youth club career ===
At age 11, Syafiq was one of the breakout stars at the Dash Football Academy, the youth academy that his father Shahrom Ismail founded. He joined the ranks of DPMM FC's under-16 team in 2019.

=== DPMM ===
Having caught the eye as the best player at a DPMM FC football festival in 2021, Syafiq trialed for a place in their first team at the start of 2023, as they were preparing for a return to the Singapore Premier League after three years away. He managed to impress head coach Adrian Pennock and was handed the number 15 shirt vacated by Hazwan Hamzah and joined Eddy Shahrol Omar, Hirzi Zulfaqar Mahzan and Nazirrudin Ismail as the new local players of the royalty-owned team for the 2023 Singapore Premier League.

Syafiq made his debut as a substitute for Hanif Farhan Azman in the 86th minute in a 3–1 defeat away to Lion City Sailors on 3 March 2023. He made the starting eleven for the first time in the match against Balestier Khalsa on 20 May of that year in a 3–2 loss.

=== Kasuka ===
After making a total of 14 appearance in league and cup for DPMM, Syafiq left the club and subsequently signed for Kasuka FC, and featured for them at the 2024–25 ASEAN Club Championship qualifying play-offs second leg against Shan United on 24 July 2024 in a 3–1 defeat. He scored his first goal for Kasuka on 24 November against Indera SC, equalising for his team in a 2–2 draw. The goal proved invaluable for Kasuka as they would stand a chance to pip DPMM II in the final fixture of the season where only a victory will do for them. Kasuka won the match 3–2, snatching the championship away from the second team of DPMM in the final moment.

Syafiq featured as a substitute in both Kasuka's campaigns for the 2025–26 Shopee Cup qualifying round against DH Cebu and the preliminary stage of the 2025–26 AFC Challenge League against Phnom Penh Crown. He managed to score four goals in 10 appearances in the league for the 2025–26 season which ended in heartbreak as the powerhouses lost to Indera SC in a title decider on 19 April 2026.

== International career ==
=== Youth ===
Syafiq was selected for the Brunei under-19 team competing at the 2022 AFF U-19 Youth Championship hosted by Indonesia in July. He played in the final game against the Philippines in a 0–5 loss. He was then drafted into the under-17s for both the 2022 AFF U-16 Youth Championship and the 2023 AFC U-17 Asian Cup qualification games later in the year, playing in every match.

In July 2025, Syafiq was selected for the Brunei under-23 team competing at the 2025 ASEAN U-23 Championship held in Indonesia. He played in every game where the Young Wasps registered three losses out of three.

=== Senior ===
Syafiq received his first call up for the full national team in March 2025 for the 2027 Asian Cup qualification fixture against Lebanon hosted by Qatar.

== Personal life ==
Syafiq is the son of Shahrom Ismail, a former footballer for the Brunei representative team in the Malaysian leagues who also played internationally for Brunei in 2003. His uncle, Shahril Ismail was also an international footballer for Brunei.

== Honours ==
Kasuka FC

- Brunei Super League: 2024–25
