= Shahrol =

Shahrol is a Malaysian masculine given name. Notable people with the name include:

- Eddy Shahrol Omar (born 2003), Bruneian footballer
- Shahrol Saperi (born 1984), Malaysian footballer
- Shahrol Yuzy (born 1976), Malaysian motorcycle racer
