= 2023 Singapore Premier League =

Singapore Premier League
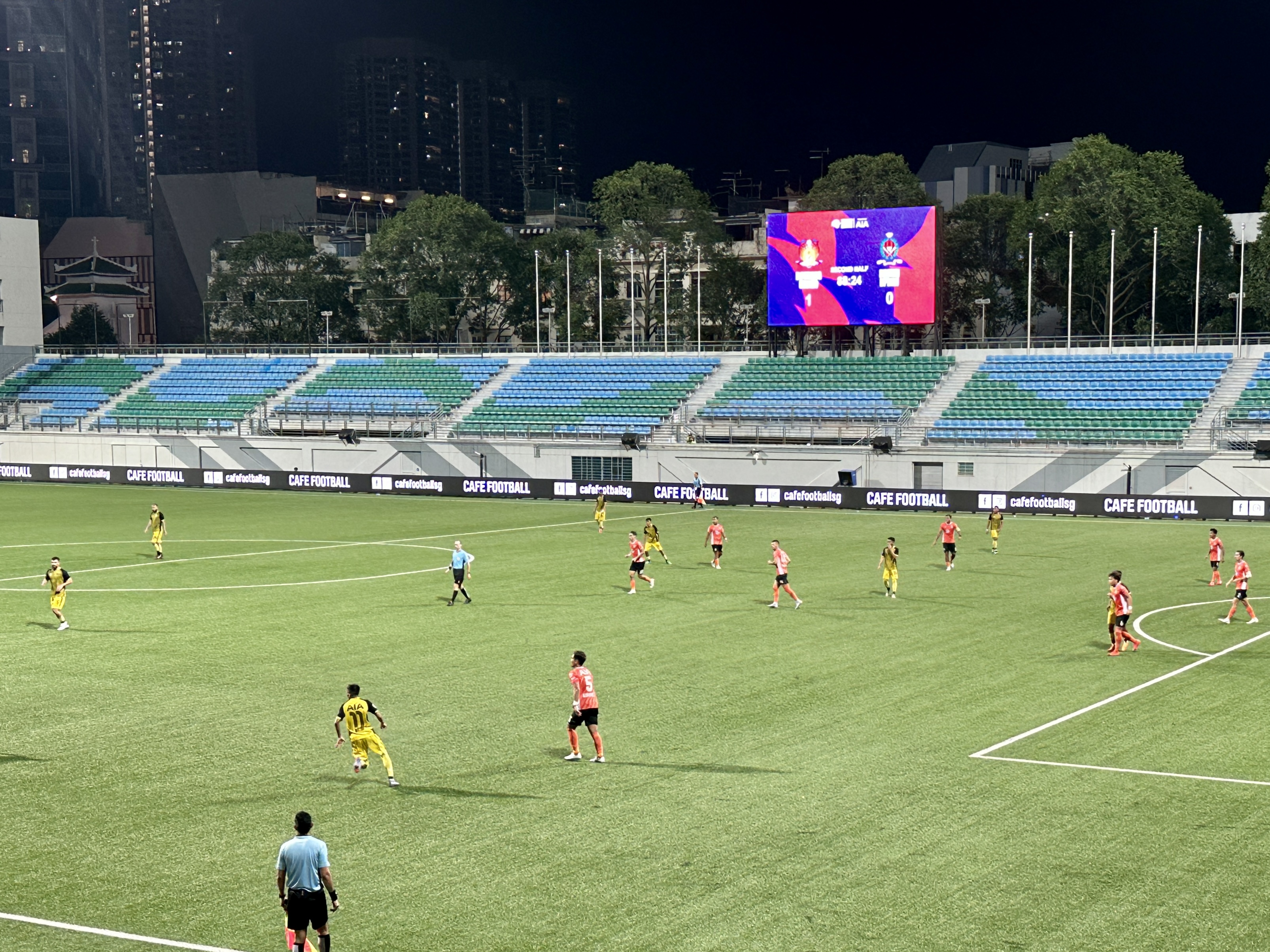
- Match between DPMM and Hougang United
- Season: 2023
- Champions: Albirex Niigata (S)
- Matches: 88
- Goals: 346 (3.93 per match)
- Top goalscorer: (Belgium) Maxime Lestienne (25 goals)
- Highest attendance: 2,497; Albirex Niigata (S) 3–1 Lion City Sailors (16 July 2023)
- Average attendance: 752

The 2023 Singapore Premier League (also known as the AIA Singapore Premier League due to sponsorship reasons) was the 6th season of the Singapore Premier League, the top-flight Singaporean professional league for football clubs, since its rebranding in 2018.

== Format ==
The following key changes were made to the rules for the 2023 season:

1. Young Lions will be allowed to register between 20 and 40 players, three of whom may be foreign or overaged Singaporean players.
2. Young Lions and Hougang United to play their home games at Jalan Besar Stadium while Lion City Sailors and Balestier Khalsa will play at Bishan Stadium. Other stadiums used are: (1) Our Tampines Hub (Tampines Rovers and Geylang International), (2) Jurong East Stadium (Albirex Niigata and Tanjong Pagar United), and (3) Hassanal Bolkiah National Stadium (DPMM). DPMM will play their 1st three home matches in Jalan Besar Stadium as their home ground is undergoing renovation.
3. Brunei DPMM are required to have a minimum of one Under-23 player of Bruneian nationality fielded during the entire first half of a match.
4. All clubs may include a maximum of five players from its COE Under-21 team in its match-day squad.
5. VAR technology will feature for the first time in Singapore league history.
1. 1st transfer window: 1 January to 19 March
2. 2nd transfer window: 1 to 28 June

== Teams ==
A total of 9 teams competed in the league. Albirex Niigata (S) was an invited foreign club from Japan, while DPMM FC was an invited foreign club from Brunei.

=== Stadiums and locations ===
Location of 2023 Singapore Premier League teams
Locations of the 2023 Singapore Premier League teams from Singapore

Image	Team	Stadium	Capacity
	Albirex Niigata (S); Tanjong Pagar United	Jurong East Stadium	2,700
	Lion City Sailors; Balestier Khalsa	Bishan Stadium	6,254
	Young Lions; Hougang United; DPMM FC	Jalan Besar Stadium	6,000
	Tampines Rovers; Geylang International	Our Tampines Hub; Jalan Besar Stadium (Btw 12-20 Apr 2023)	5,100

=== Personnel, kit and sponsoring ===
Note: Flags indicate national team as has been defined under FIFA eligibility rules. Players may hold more than one non-FIFA nationality.

Team	Head coach	Captain	Kit manufacturer	Main Shirt sponsor	Other shirt sponsors
Albirex Niigata (S)	(Japan) Kazuaki Yoshinaga	(Japan) Asahi Yokokawa	(Japan) Mizuno	(Japan) Denka	Lensmode; Kubota; Reeracoen; Kirin; EnglishCentral; Gain City; Dpro Logistics Namics; One Asia Lawyers; JPLUS+ Daiho Group; JTB; NSG; Sanpoutei Ramen; SMBC; ACCEA Singapore; PR Times; Nippon Medical Care; HIT Singapore; With You Global Creations; SD Aircon; At Twenty; Salonpas; Crown Line; SETA Technologies; Salonpas; Soken Medical; Dr. Stretch; Miura; IGPI; Thomson Jap Family Clinic; Akinori Singapore; Black Clover; Pocari Sweat; SingaLife
Balestier Khalsa	(Netherlands) Peter de Roo	(Singapore) Ho Wai Loon	(Germany) Adidas	(United States) Jeep	Weston Corporation; Project Vaults; PSB Academy; TopGrid Pest; Dr. Stretch; StarBalm; Boys' Town YouthReach
DPMM	(England) Adrian Pennock	(Brunei) Wardun Yussof	(Brunei) Pitch		Brunei Shell Marketing; Mitsubishi Corporation; Baiduri Bank; DST; You C1000; BGI; BEGAWAN ATHLETE; Waznah
Geylang International	(Singapore) Mohd Noor Ali	(Singapore) Joshua Pereira	(Thailand) FBT	(Australia) Rolos by Constructor	Epson; Broadway; Dr. Stretch; Extra Ordinary People; Optimum Nutrition; TRUE Fitness
Hougang United	(Croatia) (Germany) Marko Kraljević (Interim)	(Singapore) Zulfahmi Arifin	(Thailand) Ari	(Singapore) The Physio Circle	Cafe Football (CF); The Arena; SpeedFitness; Advance Capital; StarBalm; My Protein Singapore
Lion City Sailors	(Serbia) Aleksandar Ranković	(Singapore) Hariss Harun	(Germany) Puma	(Singapore) SEA	Shopee; Garena; Optimum Nutrition; GXA Bank
Tampines Rovers	(Singapore) Gavin Lee	(Singapore) Yasir Hanapi	(Japan) Mizuno	(Japan) ANA Courier Express	Rookbook; Ryudben Sports; Blackhole Group; Vintage Studio; Battlewin; My Protein Singapore; Bauerfeind Sports; JSSL FC; Canadian 2 for 1 pizza StarBalm; Fit Together; Black Clover
Tanjong Pagar United	(Singapore) Hasrin Jailani	(Singapore) Shakir Hamzah	(Thailand) FBT	(Japan) Tokyo Century	Samtrade Academy; Hyundai; StarBalm; The Rehab Lab
Young Lions	(Singapore) Nazri Nasir	(Singapore) Harhys Stewart	(United States) Nike		Catapult

a. Jacob Mahler was club captain at Young Lions until 19 May 2023, when it was announced he signed for Madura United. Harhys Stewart is now serving as the de facto captain.

=== Coaching changes ===
Team	Outgoing Head Coach	Manner of Departure	Date of Vacancy	Position in table	Incoming Head Coach	Date of appointment
Balestier Khalsa	(Netherlands) Peter de Roo (interim)	Appointed to permanent role				30 November 2022
Hougang United	(Singapore) Firdaus Kassim (interim)	Appointed to permanent role				15 January 2023
Young Lions	(Singapore) Nazri Nasir	Stepped down	16 December 2022	Pre-season	(Singapore) Philippe Aw	17 December 2022
Lion City Sailors	(Serbia) Luka Lalic (interim)	End of Interim	20 December 2022	Pre-season	(Bosnia and Herzegovina) Risto Vidaković	20 December 2022
Hougang United	(Singapore) Firdaus Kassim	Redesignated as Youth Coach	17 April 2023	9th	(Croatia) (Germany) Marko Kraljević (interim)	17 April 2023
Young Lions	(Singapore) Philippe Aw	Leave of Absence	18 May 2023	9th	(Singapore) Fadzuhasny Juraimi (Japan) Koichiro Iizuka (Interim)	18 May 2023
Lion City Sailors	(Bosnia and Herzegovina) Risto Vidaković	Sacked	19 June 2023	3rd	(Spain) Pablo Muñiz (Netherlands) Daan van Oudheusden (interim)	19 June 2023
Lion City Sailors	(Spain) Pablo Muñiz (Netherlands) Daan van Oudheusden (interim)	End of Interim	28 June 2023	3rd	(Serbia) Aleksandar Ranković	28 June 2023
Young Lions	(Singapore) Fadzuhasny Juraimi (Japan) Koichiro Iizuka (Interim)	End of Interim	13 July 2023	9th	(Singapore) Nazri Nasir	13 July 2023

== Foreign players ==
Singapore Premier League clubs could sign a maximum of four foreign players in the 2023 season. However, one of them had to be an AFC player.

Player name in bold indicates the player was registered during the mid-season transfer window.

Club	Player 1	Player 2	Player 3	AFC Player	U21 Player	Former Players Unregistered Players
Balestier Khalsa	(Slovenia) Alen Kozar	(Japan) Shuhei Hoshino	(Japan) Ryoya Tanigushi	(Japan) Masahiro Sugita	(England) Max McCoy (New Zealand) **Curtis Gray** (France) **Alexandre Bertholon**	(United States) Conor MacKay
DPMM FC	(Belarus) Andrey Varankow	(Spain) Ángel Martínez	(North Macedonia) **Kristijan Naumovski**	(Afghanistan) **Farshad Noor**		(Uzbekistan) Akmal Tursunbaev (Croatia) Josip Balić
Geylang International	(France) Vincent Bezecourt	(Japan) Takahiro Tezuka	(Japan) Rio Sakuma	(Japan) Yushi Yamaya	(England) Zach Whitehouse	
Hougang United	(Croatia) Kristijan Krajcek	(Serbia) **Đorđe Maksimović**	(Japan) Naoki Kuriyama	(Japan) Kazuma Takayama		(Argentina) Brian Ferreira
Lion City Sailors	(Brazil) Diego Lopes	(Belgium) Maxime Lestienne	(Curaçao) **Richairo Zivkovic**	(Australia) **Bailey Wright**	(Belgium) Nils Vandersmissen (Republic of Ireland) Joshua Little (Nepal) Aryan Bahadur Chhetri	(Australia) Obren Kljajic (Brazil) Pedro Henrique (Japan) Kodai Tanaka (Spain) Súper (Australia) Bernie Ibini-Isei
Tampines Rovers	(Montenegro) Boris Kopitović	(Serbia) Miloš Zlatković	(Japan) Shuya Yamashita	(Japan) Kyoga Nakamura		
Tanjong Pagar United	(Brazil) Pedro Dias	(Croatia) Mirko Šugić	(Croatia) Marin Mudražija	(Australia) Blake Ricciuto	(England) George Thomas (Australia) Charlie Traynor	

Albirex Niigata can sign an unlimited number of Singaporean players for this season. Only 2 local players above 23 years old are allowed.

Club	SG Overaged Player 1	SG Overaged Player 2	SG Player 1	SG Player 2	SG Player 3	Former Players
Albirex Niigata (S)	(Singapore) Hassan Sunny	(Singapore) Hyrulnizam Juma'at	(Singapore) Zamani Zamri	(Singapore) Shakthi Vinayagavijayan	(Singapore) Junki Kenn Yoshimura	(Singapore) Nicky Melvin Singh
Albirex Niigata (S)	SG Player 4	SG Player 5	SG Player 6	SG Player 7	SG Player 8	Former Players
Albirex Niigata (S)	(Singapore) Jarrel Ong Jia Wei	(Singapore) Kenji Austin	(Singapore) Hilman Norhisam	(Singapore) Firman Nabil		

Young Lions can register a total of three foreign or overaged Singaporean players.

Club	Player 1	Player 2	Player 3	Former Players Unregistered Players
Young Lions	(Japan) Kan Kobayashi	(Japan) Jun Kobayashi	(Singapore) **Amiruldin Asraf**	

== Results ==
=== League table ===
Pos	Team	Pld	W	D	L	GF	GA	GD	Pts	Qualification or relegation
1	Albirex Niigata (S) (Note: Three clubs – Albirex Niigata (S), DPMM FC and the FAS under-23 team Young Lions, are ineligible for any AFC competition spots.) (C)	24	20	2	2	86	20	+66	62	
2	Lion City Sailors (Q)	24	17	3	4	79	39	+40	54	Qualification for 2024-25 AFC Champions League Two Group Stage & ASEAN Club Championship
3	Tampines Rovers (Q)	24	14	6	4	47	32	+15	48	Qualification for 2024-25 AFC Champions League Two Group Stage
4	Balestier Khalsa	24	12	0	12	60	71	−11	36	
5	Geylang International	24	10	3	11	41	52	−11	33	
6	Hougang United	24	9	2	13	37	57	−20	29	
7	Brunei DPMM	24	6	5	13	39	43	−4	23	
8	Tanjong Pagar United	24	6	3	15	39	62	−23	21	
9	Young Lions	24	1	2	21	24	76	−52	5	

Source: Singapore Premier League
Rules for classification: 1) points; 2) goal difference; 3) number of goals scored; 4) number of wins
(C) Champions; (Q) Qualified for the phase indicated

=== Matches 1–16 ===
Home \ Away	ALB	BAL	GEY	HOU	LCS	TAM	TPU	YLI	DPM
Albirex Niigata		6–2	3–0	2–0	4–0	0–1	4–0	3–0	2–0
Balestier Khalsa	1–6		2–3	2–3	4–5	1–3	4–3	3–1	3–2
Geylang International	1–6	3–0		2–1	1–2	1–1	2–3	4–2	2–0
Hougang United	0–5	1–3	3–2		0–5	1–1	1–2	3–0	0–3
Lion City Sailors	3–2	3–0	3–0	3–0		1–1	3–1	4–1	3–1
Tampines Rovers	1–1	2–3	1–1	2–0	4–3		3–0	1–0	2–0
Tanjong Pagar United	0–2	2–4	2–0	1–3	1–7	0–2		2–1	1–1
Young Lions	2–4	1–3	0–2	2–1	1–1	0–3	3–4		2–2
DPMM FC	0–2	3–4	1–3	2–3	3–3	0–1	2–1	6–0	

Updated to match(es) played on 20 August 2023. Source: spl.sg
Legend: Blue = home team win; Yellow = draw; Red = away team win.
For upcoming matches, an "a" indicates there is an article about the rivalry between the two participants.

=== Matches 17-24 ===
Home \ Away	ALB	BAL	GEY	HOU	LCS	TAM	TPU	YLI	DPM
Albirex Niigata (S)				5–0	3–1	6–3		5–0	
Balestier Khalsa	1–5			1–3		1–3		4–2	
Geylang International	1–6	2–6		0–2				3–0	
Hougang United					2–8	0–1	3–3		1–0
Lion City Sailors		5–2	3–1				3–2		1–3
Tampines Rovers			2–3		2–5		2–1		2–2
Tanjong Pagar United	2–3	2–3	2–2					3–2	
Young Lions				2–6	0–4	2–3			0–2
DPMM FC	1–1	2–3	1–2				2–1		

Updated to match(es) played on 20 August 2023. Source: spl.sg
Legend: Blue = home team win; Yellow = draw; Red = away team win.
For upcoming matches, an "a" indicates there is an article about the rivalry between the two participants.

== Statistics ==
=== Top scorers ===
As of 16 Sept 2023

Rank	Player	Club	Goals
1	(Belgium) Maxime Lestienne	Lion City Sailors	25
2	(Japan) Ryoya Tanigushi	Balestier Khalsa	23
3	(Japan) Seia Kunori	Albirex Niigata (S)	21
4	(Montenegro) Boris Kopitović	Tampines Rovers	17
5	(Japan) Keito Komatsu	Albirex Niigata (S)	13
6	(Brunei) Hakeme Yazid Said	Brunei DPMM	12
7	(Japan) Tadanari Lee	Albirex Niigata (S)	11
7	(Japan) Shuhei Hoshino	Balestier Khalsa	11
8	(Japan) Yushi Yamaya	Geylang International	10
8	(Singapore) Abdul Rasaq	Lion City Sailors	10
8	(Singapore) Shawal Anuar	Lion City Sailors	10
9	(Belarus) Andrey Varankow	Brunei DPMM	9
9	(Croatia) Kristijan Krajcek	Hougang United	9
9	(Singapore) Faris Ramli	Tampines Rovers	9
9	(Croatia) Marin Mudražija	Tanjong Pagar United	9
10	(Japan) Riku Fukashiro	Albirex Niigata (S)	8
10	(Japan) Shuto Komaki	Albirex Niigata (S)	8

=== Top assists ===
As at 16 Sept 2023

Rank	Player	Club	Assists
1	(Belgium) Maxime Lestienne	Lion City Sailors	21
2	(Brazil) Diego Lopes	Lion City Sailors	13
3	(Japan) Shuhei Hoshino	Balestier Khalsa	12
4	(Japan) Shuto Komaki	Albirex Niigata (S)	10
4	(Japan) Seia Kunori	Albirex Niigata (S)	10
5	(Singapore) Joel Chew	Tampines Rovers	9
5	(Croatia) Kristijan Krajcek	Hougang United	9
6	(Japan) Shodai Yokokawa	Albirex Niigata (S)	8
6	(Japan) Asahi Yokokawa	Albirex Niigata (S)	8
7	(Japan) Yushi Yamaya	Geylang International	7
7	Adam Swandi	Lion City Sailors	7
8	(Japan) Tadanari Lee	Albirex Niigata (S)	6
8	(Japan) Riku Fukashiro	Albirex Niigata (S)	6
9	(Japan) Ryoya Tanigushi	Balestier Khalsa	5
9	(Singapore) Ho Wai Loon	Balestier Khalsa	5
9	(Singapore) Daniel Goh	Balestier Khalsa	5
9	(Brunei) Hakeme Yazid Said	Brunei DPMM	5
9	(Japan) Takahiro Tezuka	Geylang International	5
9	(Japan) Kan Kobayashi	Young Lions FC	5

=== Own goal ===
As at 13 Aug 2023

Player	For	Against	Date
(Singapore) Lionel Tan	Lion City Sailors	Albirex Niigata (S)	9 Mar 23
(Singapore) Ho Wai Loon	Balestier Khalsa	DPMM	10 Mar 23
(Brunei) Hirzi Zulfaqar	DPMM	Tanjong Pagar United	14 Mar 23
(Singapore) Glenn Kweh	Tampines Rovers	Lion City Sailors	31 Mar 23
(Japan) Jun Kobayashi	Young Lions FC	Tanjong Pagar United	6 Jun 23
(Japan) Kan Kobayashi	Young Lions FC	Lion City Sailors	10 Jun 23
(Singapore) Harhys Stewart	Young Lions FC	Albirex Niigata (S)	1 Jul 23
(Singapore) Joshua Pereira	Geylang International	Balestier Khalsa	12 Aug 23
(Netherlands) (Curaçao) Richairo Zivkovic	Lion City Sailors	Hougang United	13 Aug 23

=== Hat-tricks ===
As at 4 Aug 2023

Player	For	Against	Result (Date)
(Japan) Ryoya Tanigushi	Balestier Khalsa	DPMM	4–3 (10 Mar 23)
(Japan) Seia Kunori	Albirex Niigata (S)	Balestier Khalsa	6–1 (5 Apr 23)
(Belarus) Andrey Voronkov	DPMM	Lion City Sailors	3–3 (13 May 23)
(Singapore) Amy Recha	Hougang United	DPMM	3–2 (7 Jun 23)
(Belgium) Maxime Lestienne	Lion City Sailors	Young Lions	4–0 (7 Jul 23)
(Japan) Keito Komatsu	Albirex Niigata (S)	Young Lions	5–0 (22 Jul 23)
(Japan) Seia Kunori ^{4}	Albirex Niigata (S)	Geylang International	6–1 (3 Aug 23)
(Belgium) Maxime Lestienne	Lion City Sailors	Tampines Rovers	5-2 (4 Aug 23)

Note ^{4} Player scored 4 goals

=== Clean sheets ===
As at 16 Sept 2023

Rank	Player	Club	Clean Sheets
1	(Singapore) Hassan Sunny	Albirex Niigata (S)	9
2	(Singapore) Syazwan Buhari	Tampines Rovers	8
3	(Singapore) Zharfan Rohaizad	Lion City Sailors	5
4	(Singapore) Hafiz Ahmad	Geylang International	3
4	(Singapore) Zaiful Nizam	Hougang United	3
5	(Japan) (United States) Kai Yamamoto	Albirex Niigata (S)	1
5	(Singapore) Hyrulnizam Juma'at	Albirex Niigata (S)	1
5	(Brunei) Haimie Abdullah Nyaring	DPMM	1
5	(North Macedonia) Kristijan Naumovski	DPMM	1
5	(Singapore) Rudy Khairullah	Geylang International	1
5	(Singapore) Ridhuan Barudin	Tampines Rovers	1
5	(Singapore) Kenji Syed Rusydi	Tanjong Pagar United	1

=== Penalty missed ===
As at 15 Sept 2023

Player	For	Against	Date
(Croatia) Mirko Šugić	Tanjong Pagar United	Lion City Sailors	24 Feb 23
(Brazil) Diego Lopes	Lion City Sailors	Geylang International	15 Mar 23
(Belarus) Andrey Voronkov	DPMM	Tampines Rovers	20 Apr 23
(Belarus) Andrey Voronkov	DPMM	Tanjong Pagar United	7 May 23
(Japan) Seia Kunori	Albirex Niigata (S)	DPMM	11 Jun 23
(Japan) Yushi Yamaya	Geylang International	DPMM	28 Jun 23
(Japan) Kan Kobayashi	Young Lions FC	Albirex Niigata (S)	1 Jul 23
(Belgium) Maxime Lestienne	Lion City Sailors	DPMM	11 Jul 23
(Japan) Ryoya Tanigushi	Balestier Khalsa	DPMM	16 Jul 23
(Japan) Seia Kunori	Albirex Niigata	Tampines Rovers	28 Jul 23
(Brunei) Hakeme Yazid Said	DPMM	Geylang International	28 Jul 23
(Netherlands) (Curaçao) Richairo Zivkovic	Lion City Sailors	Balestier Khalsa	31 Jul 23
(Japan) Ryoya Tanigushi	Balestier Khalsa	Lion City Sailors	31 Jul 23
(Singapore) Syukri Bashir	Tanjong Pagar United	Young Lions FC	5 Aug 23
(Singapore) Amiruldin Asraf	Young Lions FC	Tanjong Pagar United	5 Aug 23
(Japan) Ryoya Tanigushi	Balestier Khalsa	Tampines Rovers	15 Sept 23

=== Referee's record ===
As at 16 Sept 2023

Referee	Match	Yellow card	Red card
Jansen Foo	15	78	11
Farhan Mohd	16	61	4
Ahmad A'qashah	14	50	3
Clarence Leow	12	41	3
Muhammad Taqi	10	42	2
Hilmi Faud	11	37	7
Andrea Verolino	12	36	2
Taufik Thana	11	31	1
Syarqawi Buhari	6	25	3

=== Team's discipline ===
As at 16 Sept 2023

Team	Yellow card	Red card
Brunei DPMM	59	5
Tanjong Pagar United	56	6
Geylang International	50	7
Hougang United	50	2
Tampines Rovers	42	4
Young Lions	42	4
Lion City Sailors	37	3
Balestier Khalsa	33	2
Albirex Niigata (S)	31	2

=== Player's discipline ===
As at 6 Jul 2023

Player	Team	Yellow card	Red card	Second yellow card
(Singapore) Danish Irfan	Geylang International	0	0	2
(Brunei) Yura Indera	DPMM	4	1	1
(Singapore) Tajeli Salamat	Tanjong Pagar United	7	1	0
(Brunei) Hanif Hamir	DPMM	6	1	0
(Singapore) Nazrul Nazari	Hougang United	6	0	0
(Serbia) Milos Zlatkovic	Tampines Rovers	6	0	0
(Croatia) Marin Mudražija	Tanjong Pagar United	6	0	0
(Singapore) Jared Gallagher	Young Lions FC	6	0	0
(Spain) Ángel Martínez	DPMM	3	0	1

== Awards ==
=== Monthly awards ===
Month	Player of the Month		Young Player of the Month		Coach of the Month		Goal of the Month	Ref
Month	Player	Club	Player	Club	Coach	Club	Player vs.	Ref
February / March	(Singapore) Faris Ramli	Tampines Rovers	(Japan) Seia Kunori	Albirex Niigata (S)	(Singapore) Gavin Lee	Tampines Rovers	(Belarus) Andrey Varankow vs. Tanjong Pagar United (14/3/2023)	
April / May	(Belgium) Maxime Lestienne	Lion City Sailors	(Singapore) Abdul Rasaq	Lion City Sailors	(Netherlands) Peter de Roo	Balestier Khalsa	(Singapore) Abdul Rasaq vs. Albirex Niigata (S) (21/5/2023)	
June	(Belgium) Maxime Lestienne	Lion City Sailors	(Brunei) Hakeme Yazid Said	DPMM FC	(Japan) Kazuaki Yoshinaga	Albirex Niigata (S)	(Singapore) Shakir Hamzah vs. Young Lions FC (6/6/2023)	
July	(Japan) Keito Komatsu	Albirex Niigata (S)	(Brunei) Hakeme Yazid Said	DPMM FC	(Japan) Kazuaki Yoshinaga	Albirex Niigata (S)	(Japan) Ryoya Tanigushi vs. Young Lions FC (12/7/2023)	

== Singapore Premier League Awards night winners ==
Awards	Winners	Club
Player of the Year	(Belgium) Maxime Lestienne	Lion City Sailors
Young Player of the Year	(Japan) Seia Kunori	Albirex Niigata (S)
Coach of the Year	(Japan) Kazuaki Yoshinaga	Albirex Niigata (S)
Top Scorer Award	(Belgium) Maxime Lestienne	Lion City Sailors
Golden Gloves	(Singapore) Syazwan Buhari	Tampines Rovers
Goal of the Year	(Singapore) Khairul Amri vs. Hougang United (6/4/2023)	Tanjong Pagar United
Fair Play Award	(Japan) Albirex Niigata (S)	
Referee of the Year	(Singapore) Andrea Verolino	

AIA Team of the Year
Goalkeeper	(Singapore) Syazwan Buhari (Tampines Rovers)			
Defence	(Japan) Koki Kawachi (Albirex Niigata (S))		(Japan) Asahi Yokokawa (Albirex Niigata (S))	(Serbia) Miloš Zlatković (Tampines Rovers)
Midfield	(Japan) Kyoga Nakamura (Tampines Rovers)	(Japan) Ryoya Taniguchi (Balestier Khalsa)	(Brazil) Diego Lopes (Lion City Sailors)	(Belgium) Maxime Lestienne (Lion City Sailors)
Attack	(Japan) Seia Kunori (Albirex Niigata (S))		(Brunei) Hakeme Yazid (DPMM FC)	(Singapore) Shawal Anuar (Lion City Sailors)
