= Miloš Zlatković =

Serbian footballer

Personal information
- Full name: Miloš Zlatković
- Date of birth: 1 January 1997 (age 29)
- Place of birth: Niš, FR Yugoslavia
- Height: 1.84 m (6 ft 0 in)
- Positions: Left back; center back

Team information
- Current team: Becamex Ho Chi Minh City
- Number: 24

Youth career
- Radnički Niš
- OFK Beograd

Senior career*
Years	Team	Apps	(Gls)
2014–2017	OFK Beograd	27	(0)
2018–2019	Zvijezda 09	8	(0)
2019	Zemun	1	(0)
2019–2021	Dinamo Vranje	32	(1)
2021–2023	Balzan	38	(2)
2023–2025	Tampines Rovers	48	(8)
2025–	Becamex Ho Chi Minh City	23	(2)

International career
2013–2014	Serbia U17	6	(0)
2015–2016	Serbia U19	5	(0)
- * Club domestic league appearances and goals as of 7 June 2026

Miloš Zlatković (Serbian Cyrillic: Милош Златковић; born 1 January 1997) is a Serbian professional footballer who plays mainly either as a centre-back or left-back for V.League 1 club Becamex Ho Chi Minh City.

== Career ==
=== OFK Beograd ===
In 2014, Zlatković was promoted to the senior squad. Zlatković then made his debut for the first team on 16 May 2015, coming on as a substitute during the break against Crvena Zvezda.

=== Zvijezda 09 ===
On 7 March 2018, Zlatković moved to Bosnia club, Zvijezda 09.

=== FK Zemun ===
On 12 February 2019, Zlatković returned home to join FK Zemun.

=== Dinamo Vranje ===
On 28 July 2019, Zlatković was transferred to Dinamo Vranje.

=== Balzan ===
On 28 July 2021, Zlatković moved to Malta club, Balzan.

=== Tampines Rovers ===
On 10 January 2023, it was reported that Zlatković joined Tampines Rovers in the Singapore Premier League. On 4 August 2023, he scored his first goal for the club against Lion City Sailors. In his first season, he was named in the 2023 Singapore Premier League 'Team of the Year'.

=== Becamex Ho Chi Minh City ===
Zlatković initially signed a contract extension with Tampines Rovers on 24 June 2025 for the 2025–26 season but he ended up leaving the club thus signing with V.League 1 club Becamex Ho Chi Minh City on 19 July 2025.

== Career statistics ==
=== Club ===
As of 25 May 2024

Club	Season	League			FA Cup		League Cup		UEFA Cup		Total	
Club	Season	Division	Apps	Goals	Apps	Goals	Apps	Goals	Apps	Goals	Apps	Goals
OFK Beograd	2014–15	Serbian SuperLiga	2	0	0	0	0	0	0	0	2	0
OFK Beograd	2015–16	Serbian SuperLiga	13	0	0	0	0	0	0	0	13	0
OFK Beograd	2016–17	Serbian First League	12	0	0	0	0	0	0	0	12	0
OFK Beograd	Total		27	0	0	0	0	0	0	0	27	0
FK Zvijezda 09	2018–19	Bosnia Premier League	8	0	2	0	0	0	0	0	10	0
FK Zemun	2018–19	Serbian SuperLiga	1	0	0	0	0	0	0	0	1	0
Dinamo Vranje	2019–20	Serbian First League	11	1	0	0	0	0	0	0	11	1
Dinamo Vranje	2020–21	Serbian First League	21	0	1	0	0	0	0	0	22	0
Dinamo Vranje	Total		32	1	1	0	0	0	0	0	33	1
Balzan	2021–22	Maltese Premier League	13	1	2	0	0	0	0	0	15	1
Balzan	2022–23	Maltese Premier League	25	1	0	0	0	0	0	0	25	1
Balzan	Total		38	2	2	0	0	0	0	0	40	2
Club	Season	League			Singapore Cup		League Cup & Others		AFC & ACL		Total	
Club	Season	Division	Apps	Goals	Apps	Goals	Apps	Goals	Apps	Goals	Apps	Goals
Tampines Rovers	2023	Singapore Premier League	18	1	6	1	0	0	1	0	25	2
Tampines Rovers	2024–25	Singapore Premier League	30	7	7	0	0	0	6	0	43	7
Tampines Rovers	Total		48	8	13	1	0	0	7	0	68	8
Career total			150	8	11	1	0	0	7	0	161	9

== International Statistics ==
=== U19 International caps ===
No	Date	Venue	Opponent	Result	Competition
1	14 August 2014	NTC Senec, Slovakia	Slovakia	3-0 (won)	Friendly
2	8 October 2015	Kadriorg Stadium, Estonia	Estonia	5-0 (won)	UEFA European Under-19 Championship qualification
3	10 October 2015	Kalevi Keskstaadion, Estonia	Armenia	4-0 (won)	UEFA European Under-19 Championship qualification
4	13 October 2015	Kalevi Keskstaadion, Estonia	Czech Republic	2-4 (lost)	UEFA European Under-19 Championship qualification
5	13 November 2015	Sportpark Husterhöhe, Germany	Germany	0-1 (lost)	Friendly
6	13 November 2015	Stadio Nicola Tubaldi, Italy	Italy	1-4 (lost)	Friendly
7	26 March 2016	Stadion Metalac, Serbia	Montenegro	4-1 (won)	UEFA European Under-19 Championship qualification
8	29 March 2016	Čika Dača Stadium, Serbia	France	0-1 (won)	UEFA European Under-19 Championship qualification
9	26 June 2016	Sportski centar FSS, Serbia	Bosnia and Herzegovina	0-2 (lost)	Friendly

=== U18 International caps ===
No	Date	Venue	Opponent	Result	Competition
1	3 March 2015	Sportski Centar Stara Pazova, Serbia	Poland	5-2 (won)	Friendly
2	21 April 2015	Stadion Grünfeld, Switzerland	Switzerland	1-1 (draw)	Friendly
3	23 April 2015	Stadion Grünfeld, Switzerland	Switzerland	1-3 (lost)	Friendly
4	5 June 2015	Estádio Municipal de Mafra, Portugal	Norway	1-1 (draw)	Friendly
5	7 June 2015	Estádio Municipal de Mafra, Portugal	Portugal	1-2 (lost)	Friendly

=== U17 International caps ===
No	Date	Venue	Opponent	Result	Competition
1	1 October 2013	Stadion Promenada, Serbia	Andorra	6-0 (won)	Friendly
2	3 October 2013	Stadion Promenada, Serbia	Estonia	4-1 (won)	Friendly
3	5 October 2013	Stadion Kralj Petar Prvi, Serbia	Greece	0-0 (draw)	Friendly
4	26 March 2014	Sportski Centar Stara Pazova, Serbia	Republic of Ireland	2-1 (won)	UEFA European Under-17 Championship qualification
5	28 March 2014	Sportski Centar Stara Pazova, Serbia	Georgia	2-1 (won)	UEFA European Under-17 Championship qualification
6	31 March 2014	Karađorđe Stadium, Serbia	Germany	1-1 (draw)	UEFA European Under-17 Championship qualification

== Honours ==
=== Individual ===
- Singapore Premier League Team of the Year: 2023
