= Ángel Martínez (footballer, born 1991) =

Spanish footballer

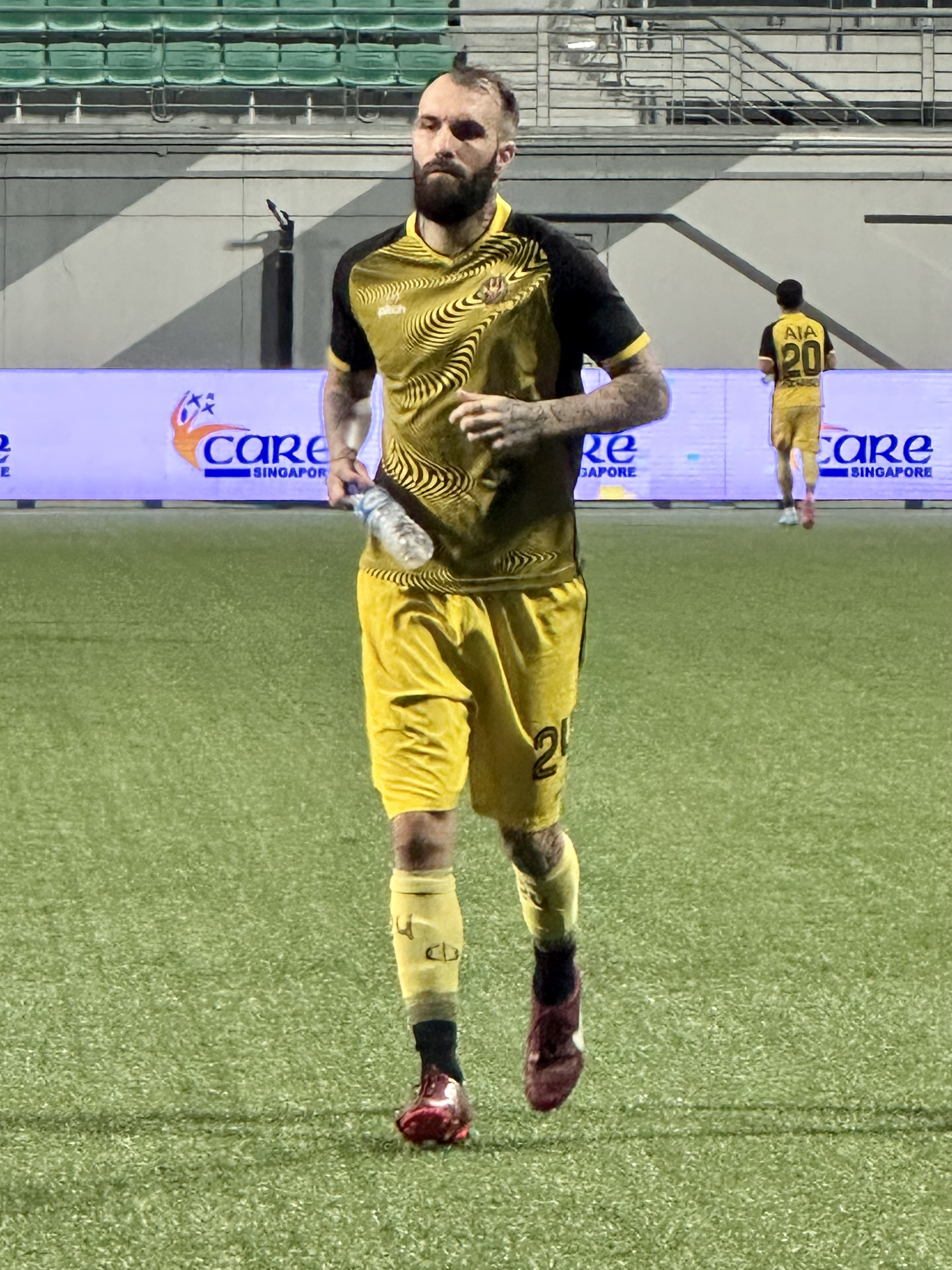
- Ángel with DPMM in 2023

Personal information
- Full name: Ángel Martínez Ortega
- Date of birth: 17 May 1991 (age 35)
- Place of birth: Barcelona, Spain
- Height: 1.84 m (6 ft 1/2 in)
- Position: Defender

Youth career
- 1999–2001: Damm
- 2001–2009: Espanyol

Senior career*
Years	Team	Apps	(Gls)
2009–2011	Espanyol B	15	(0)
2010–2011	→ Jaén (loan)	22	(0)
2011–2013	Deportivo La Coruña B	63	(3)
2013–2014	Guijuelo	28	(0)
2014–2015	Espanyol B	31	(0)
2015–2017	Reus	62	(0)
2017–2018	Zaragoza	17	(0)
2018–2020	Asteras Tripolis	36	(0)
2020	Viitorul	4	(0)
2021–2022	Lamia	33	(0)
2023	DPMM	20	(2)
2024	Linares Deportivo	8	(0)
Total		339	(5)

International career
2007	Spain U16	1	(0)
2007–2008	Spain U17	7	(1)
2009	Spain U18	3	(0)
2009–2010	Spain U19	3	(0)
Medal record
Men's football
Representing Spain
UEFA European Under-17 Championship
Winner	2008 Turkey
- * Club domestic league appearances and goals

Ángel Martínez Ortega (born 17 May 1991) is a Spanish former professional footballer who played as a left-back or a central defender.

== Club career ==
Born in Barcelona, Catalonia, Martínez finished his development at RCD Espanyol. He made his senior debut for their reserves on 30 August 2009, starting in a 0–0 Segunda División B home draw against Sporting Mahonés CF.

On 20 August 2010, Martínez was loaned to Real Jaén of the same league for one season. On 12 July of the following year he signed for another reserve team, Deportivo Fabril in the Tercera División.

Martínez returned to the third division on 1 August 2013, joining CD Guijuelo. He continued to compete at that level the following years, representing Espanyol B and CF Reus Deportiu. He achieved promotion to Segunda División with the latter side, appearing in 32 matches in the process.

Martínez made his professional debut on 27 August 2016, starting in a 1–1 home draw with CD Mirandés. The following 13 June, he agreed to a two-year deal with Real Zaragoza also from the second tier.

On 4 July 2018, Martínez moved abroad for the first time in his career, signing a two-year contract with Super League Greece club Asteras Tripolis FC. He scored his first goal for them on 25 September in a 2–1 home win over Apollon Smyrnis F.C. in the group phase of the Greek Cup, adding another in the round of 16 against Athlitiki Enosi Larissa F.C. to help the hosts to win 5–3 and qualify 7–6 on aggregate.

On 17 August 2020, Martínez agreed to a deal at FC Viitorul Constanța of the Romanian Liga I. On 28 December, he was released by mutual consent.

Martínez continued playing abroad the following seasons, with PAS Lamia 1964 (Greek top flight) and DPMM FC (Singapore Premier League). He returned to Spain after six years away on 10 January 2024, signing for Primera Federación side Linares Deportivo until 30 June. He made his debut ten days later, starting the 2–0 victory over Mérida AD.

On 11 May 2024, the 33-year-old Martínez announced his retirement on social media due to an underlying heart condition.

== International career ==
Martínez played for Spain in the 2008 UEFA European Under-17 Championship, scoring in the 2–1 semi-final win against the Netherlands and helping his country to win the tournament.

== Career statistics ==
Appearances and goals by club, season and competition
Club	Season	League			National cup (Note: Includes Copa del Rey, Greek Cup, Cupa României, Singapore Cup)		Continental		Other		Total	
Club	Season	Division	Apps	Goals	Apps	Goals	Apps	Goals	Apps	Goals	Apps	Goals
Espanyol B	2009–10	Segunda División B	15	0	—		—		1 (Note: Appearances in relegation play-offs)	0	16	0
Jaén	2010–11	Segunda División B	22	0	0	0	—		—		22	0
Deportivo La Coruña B	2011–12	Tercera División	33	3	—		—		—		33	3
Deportivo La Coruña B	2012–13	Tercera División	30	0	—		—		4 (Note: Appearances in promotion play-offs)	0	34	0
Deportivo La Coruña B	Total		63	3	—		—		4	0	67	3
Guijuelo	2013–14	Segunda División B	28	0	—		—		2	0	30	0
Espanyol B	2014–15	Segunda División B	31	0	—		—		—		31	0
Reus	2015–16	Segunda División B	29	0	4	1	—		3	0	36	1
Reus	2016–17	Segunda División	33	0	0	0	—		—		33	0
Reus	Total		62	0	4	1	—		3	0	69	1
Zaragoza	2017–18	Segunda División	17	0	1	0	—		—		18	0
Asteras Tripolis	2018–19	Super League Greece	20	0	8	2	1 (Note: Appearance in UEFA Europa League)	0	—		29	2
Asteras Tripolis	2019–20	Super League Greece	16	0	2	0	0	0	—		18	0
Asteras Tripolis	Total		36	0	10	2	1	0	—		47	2
Viitorul	2020–21	Liga I	4	0	1	0	—		—		5	0
Lamia	2020–21	Super League Greece	16	0	0	0	—		—		16	0
Lamia	2021–22	Super League Greece	17	0	2	0	—		2	0	21	0
Lamia	Total		33	0	2	0	—		2	0	37	0
DPMM	2023	Singapore Premier League	20	2	7	0	0	0	0	0	27	2
Linares Deportivo	2023–24	Primera Federación	8	0	0	0	—		—		8	0
Career total			339	5	25	3	1	0	12	0	377	8

== Honours ==
Spain U17

- UEFA European Under-17 Championship: 2008
