= Farshad Noor =

Afghan footballer

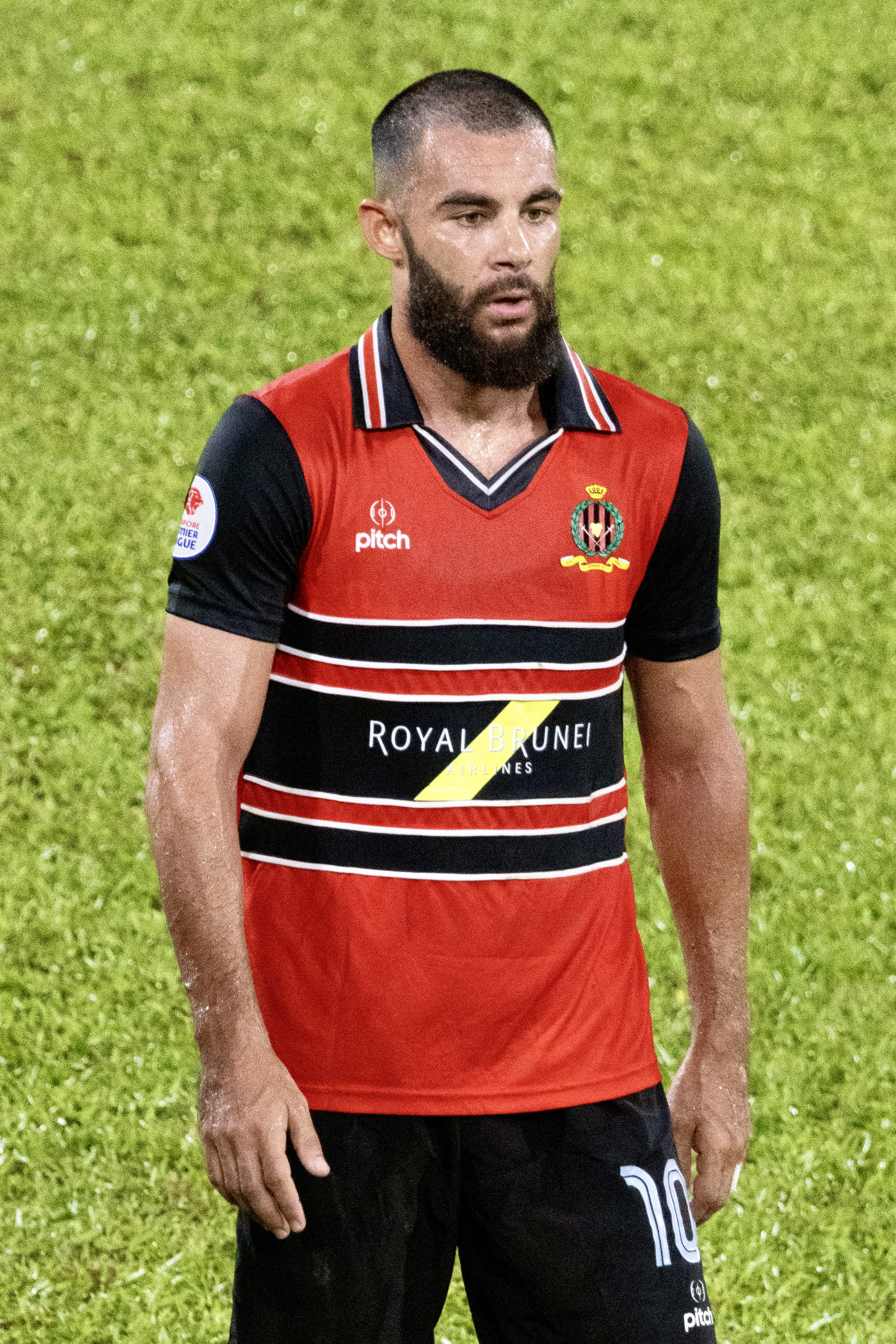
- Noor with DPMM in 2025

Personal information
- Date of birth: 2 October 1994 (age 32)
- Place of birth: Balkh, Afghanistan
- Height: 1.77 m (5 ft 10 in)
- Position: Midfielder

Team information
- Current team: Spartakos Kitiou
- Number: 94

Youth career
- Wilhelmina Boys
- 2004–2015: PSV

Senior career*
Years	Team	Apps	(Gls)
2013–2015	PSV	0	(0)
2013–2015	Jong PSV	67	(3)
2015–2017	Roda JC	26	(0)
2016–2017	→ SC Cambuur (loan)	3	(0)
2017–2018	AFC Eskilstuna	8	(1)
2018–2020	Nea Salamis	59	(6)
2021	Persib Bandung	0	(0)
2021–2022	Al Hala	0	(0)
2022	Bahrain SC	0	(0)
2022–2023	Gokulam Kerala	20	(3)
2023–2025	DPMM	36	(2)
2026–	Spartakos Kitiou	13	(0)

International career^{‡}
2010	Netherlands U17	2	(0)
2017–	Afghanistan	33	(4)
- * Club domestic league appearances and goals as of 3 May 2026 ‡ National team caps and goals as of 17 October 2023

Farshad Noor (Dari: فرشاد نور; born 2 October 1994) is an Afghan professional footballer who plays as a midfielder for Spartakos Kitiou. He represented the Afghanistan national team as captain.

== Youth career ==
Noor joined the PSV Youth Academy in the 2004–05 season.

== Club career ==
=== PSV ===
Noor signed his first professional contract with PSV on 15 February 2013. Noor made his debut for Jong PSV in the Eerste Divisie against Sparta Rotterdam on 3 August 2013. He scored his first goal against Den Bosch on 20 September 2013. After making 66 appearances and scoring 3 goals he left PSV for Roda JC.

=== Roda JC ===
On 7 August 2015 Noor signed a one-year contract with Roda JC. After signing with Roda JC Noor was one of the better players in the first half of the season. He showed his skills with outstanding performance against Heracles Almelo in his debut with an assist and starting the first four games without being substituted. After a good first half of the season Noor got injured. On 19 May 2016 Roda JC extended his contract until the summer of 2017. After a good first year Noor didn't play much in the first half of the 2016–17 season. Eventually Roda JC and Noor decided to search for a new club on loan or a transfer to get more playtime.

=== SC Cambuur ===
On 19 January 2017 Roda JC announced on their website that Noor was loaned to Cambuur until the summer of 2017. He made his debut against his former team Jong PSV and made an assist in a 2–0 win.

=== AFC Eskilstuna ===
On 28 July 2017, Noor signed a six-month contract with Swedish club AFC Eskilstuna. He made his competitive debut for the club on 13 August 2017 in a 1–1 away draw with AIK. He was subbed on for Omar Eddahri in the 61st minute.

=== Nea Salamis ===
In January 2018, Noor signed for Nea Salamis in the Cypriot First Division. He made his league debut for the club on 21 January 2018 in a 3–0 home victory over Pafos. He was subbed on for Alastair Reynolds in the 67th minute. He scored his first league goal for the club as part of a brace on 10 March 2018 in a 6–2 away victory over Doxa. He scored in the 58th and 84th minutes. In July 2020, Noor was released from the club.

=== Persib Bandung ===
On 21 March 2021, Noor moved to Asia to signed with Indonesia club, Persib Bandung. On 29 March 2021, he make his club debut in the 2021 Menpora Cup against Persita Tangerang. He was released by the club on 26 April 2021 after the cup final.

=== Al Hala ===
On 20 June 2021, Noor signed with Bahraini Premier League club, Al Hala.

=== Gokulam Kerala ===
In October 2022, Noor signed with I-League defending champions Gokulam Kerala.

=== DPMM ===
In June 2023, Noor signed for Brunei DPMM, who play in the Singapore Premier League. Later the same month, he scored his first goal for the club in a 6–0 victory over Young Lions via a penalty kick.

=== Spartakos Kitiou ===
After leaving DPMM at the conclusion of the 2024–25 season, Noor signed for Spartakos Kitiou of the Cypriot Second Division.

== International career ==
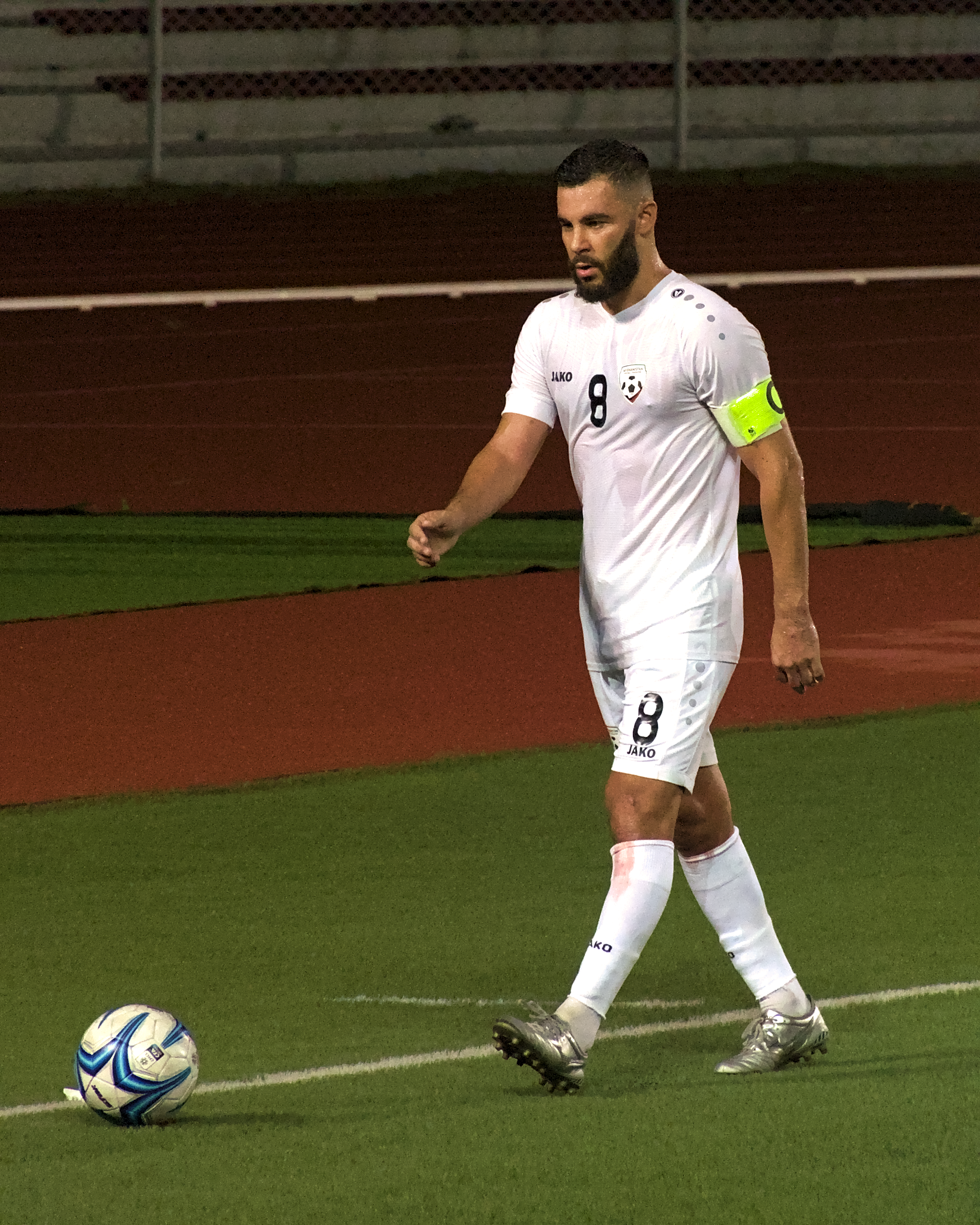
Noor with Afghanistan in 2023

=== Netherlands ===
Noor made his debut for the Netherlands U17 in a friendly match against Italy U17.

=== Afghanistan ===
Noor was invited for the provisional squad for the training camp in Doha, Qatar. He made his debut for Afghanistan in a friendly 2–1 win over Singapore on 23 March 2017.

On 10 September 2019, Noor scored his first goal for Afghanistan against Bangladesh in the second round of the 2022 FIFA World Cup qualifiers.

In June 2023, Noor captained Afghanistan in the 2023 CAFA Nations Cup held in Kyrgyzstan and Uzbekistan. On 13 June 2023, he scored a banger from a free kick against Asian giant, Iran.

In the second leg of the 2026 FIFA World Cup qualification – first round, Noor scored the only goal in the match securing the win over Mongolia at the MFF Football Centre which sent Afghanistan to the second round.

== Personal life ==
Noor was born in Kabul, Afghanistan. When he was 5 years old his parents fled the country because of the war in Afghanistan. They currently live in Best, Netherlands.

== Career statistics ==
=== Club ===
As of 29 May 2025

Club	Season	League			Cup		Other		Continental		Total	
Club	Season	Division	Apps	Goals	Apps	Goals	Apps	Goals	Apps	Goals	Apps	Goals
Jong PSV	2013–14	Eerste Divisie	30	1	0	0	—		—		30	1
Jong PSV	2014–15	Eerste Divisie	37	2	0	0	—		—		37	2
Jong PSV	Total		67	3	0	0	0	0	0	0	67	3
Roda JC	2015–16	Eredivisie	12	0	1 (Note: Appearance(s) in KNVB Cup)	0	—		—		13	0
Roda JC	2016–17	Eredivisie	14	0	1	0	—		—		15	0
Roda JC	Total		26	0	2	0	0	0	0	0	28	0
Cambuur	2016–17	Eerste Divisie	1	0	1	0	—		—		2	0
AFC Eskilstuna	2017	Allsvenskan	8	1	1 (Note: Appearance(s) in Swedish Cup)	0	—		—		9	1
Nea Salamis	2017–18	Cypriot First Division	13	3	4 (Note: Appearance(s) in Cypriot Cup)	0	—		—		17	3
Nea Salamis	2018–19	Cypriot First Division	29	2	1	0	—		—		30	2
Nea Salamis	2019–20	Cypriot First Division	17	1	2	0	—		—		19	1
Nea Salamis	Total		59	6	7	0	0	0	0	0	66	6
Persib Bandung	2021–22	Liga 1	0	0	7 (Note: Appearance(s) in Menpora Cup)	0	—		—		7	0
Gokulam Kerala	2022–23	I-League	20	3	4 (Note: Appearance(s) in Super Cup)	1	2 (Note: Appearance(s) in Baji Rout Cup) (Note: Appearance(s) in play–offs for AFC Cup)	0	—		26	4
DPMM	2023	Singapore Premier League	11	2	7 (Note: Appearance(s) in Singapore Cup)	3	1	1	—		19	6
DPMM	2024–25	Singapore Premier League	25	0	3	0	0	0	—		28	0
DPMM	Total		36	2	10	3	1	1	0	0	47	6
Career total			210	15	32	4	3	1	0	0	245	20

=== International ===
As of matches played 17 October 2023

National team	Year	Apps	Goals
Afghanistan	2017	8	0
Afghanistan	2018	3	0
Afghanistan	2019	8	1
Afghanistan	2021	6	0
Afghanistan	2022	3	1
Afghanistan	2023	5	2
Total		33	4

=== International goals ===
Scores and results list Afghanistan's goal tally first.

#	Date	Venue	Opponent	Score	Result	Competition
1.	10 September 2019	Pamir Stadium, Dushanbe, Tajikistan	Bangladesh	1–0	1–0	2022 FIFA World Cup qualification
2.	8 June 2022	Salt Lake Stadium, Kolkata, India	Hong Kong	1–2	1–2	2023 AFC Asian Cup qualification
3.	13 June 2023	Dolen Omurzakov Stadium, Bishkek, Kyrgyzstan	Iran	1–5	1–6	2023 CAFA Nations Cup
4.	17 October 2023	MFF Football Centre, Ulaanbaatar, Mongolia	Mongolia	1–0	1–0	2026 FIFA World Cup qualification
