= Yushi Yamaya =

Japanese footballer (born 2000)

Yushi Yamaya 山谷 侑士
Personal information
- Full name: Yushi Yamaya
- Date of birth: June 11, 2000 (age 26)
- Place of birth: Kanagawa, Japan
- Height: 1.77 m (5 ft 10 in)
- Positions: Right winger; forward

Team information
- Current team: Kendal Tornado
- Number: 7

Youth career
- Yokohama F. Marinos

Senior career*
| Years | Team | Apps | (Gls) |
| 2019–2023 | Yokohama F. Marinos | 3 | (0) |
| 2020–2021 | → Mito HollyHock (loan) | 12 | (1) |
| 2021–2022 | → Kagoshima United (loan) | 18 | (1) |
| 2023 | Geylang International | 24 | (10) |
| 2024–2025 | AB | 28 | (4) |
| 2025–2026 | FC Gifu | 28 | (1) |
| 2026– | Kendal Tornado | | |
- * Club domestic league appearances and goals as of 12 September 2026

Yushi Yamaya (山谷 侑士, Yamaya Yūshi; born 11 June 2000) is a Japanese professional footballer. His regular playing position is a forward or a winger. He currently plays for Championship club Kendal Tornado.

== Career ==
=== Yokohama F. Marinos ===
Yamaya signed for Yokohama F. Marinos ahead of the 2019 season. He made his first appearance for the Tricolore in a J.League Cup match against local rivals Shonan Bellmare on 13 March 2019. He started the match and was then substituted by Noah Kenshin Browne in the 82nd minute of a 2–0 defeat. A month later he played the full 90 minutes and scored the opening goal in a 2–2 draw at home to V-Varen Nagasaki. He was also on the scoresheet in his third appearance of the campaign, a 4–0 rout of Hokkaido Consadole Sapporo on 8 May 2019.

His first J.League appearance came as an 86th minute substitute for the Brazilian, Marcos Júnior in a 3–0 win away to Urawa Red Diamonds on 5 April 2019.

=== Geylang International FC ===
On 12 January 2023, it was announced that Geylang International had completed the signing of Yamaya.

=== AB ===
On 13 January 2024, Yamaya joined Danish 2nd Division side Akademisk Boldklub on a deal until June 2026. He left the club again in June 2025, after terminating his contract by mutual agreement.

== Career statistics ==
Last update: 28 Feb 2023

| Club performance | | | League | | Cup | | League Cup | | Total | |
| Season | Club | League | Apps | Goals | Apps | Goals | Apps | Goals | Apps | Goals |
| Japan | | | League | | Emperor's Cup | | League Cup | | Total | |
|---|---|---|---|---|---|---|---|---|---|---|
| 2019 | Yokohama F. Marinos | J1 | 3 | 0 | 3 | 0 | 4 | 2 | 10 | 2 |
| 2020 | Mito HollyHock | J2 | 12 | 1 | 0 | 0 | 0 | 0 | 12 | 1 |
| 2021 | Kagoshima United | J3 | 18 | 1 | 2 | 1 | 0 | 0 | 20 | 2 |
| 2022 | Yokohama FC | J2 | 2 | 0 | 2 | 0 | 0 | 0 | 4 | 0 |
| Singapore | | | League | | Singapore Cup | | Others | | Total | |
| 2023 | Geylang International | SPL | 24 | 10 | 1 | 1 | 0 | 0 | 25 | 11 |
| Denmark | | | League | | Danish Cup | | Others | | Total | |
| 2023–24 | Akademisk Boldklub | Danish 2nd Division | 14 | 1 | 0 | 0 | 0 | 0 | 14 | 1 |
| 2024–25 | Akademisk Boldklub | Danish 2nd Division | 0 | 0 | 0 | 0 | 0 | 0 | 0 | 0 |
| Career total | | | 72 | 13 | 8 | 2 | 4 | 2 | 84 | 17 |

== International Statistics ==
=== U15 International caps ===
| No | Date | Venue | Opponent | Result | Competition |
|---|---|---|---|---|---|
| 1 | 25 March 2015 | Sakai City Soccer National Training Center, Japan | Uzbekistan | 4-0 (won) | Japan-Central Asia Exchange Tournament |
| 2 | 26 March 2015 | Sakai City Soccer National Training Center, Japan | Iran | 1-2 (lost) | Japan-Central Asia Exchange Tournament |
| 3 | 27 March 2015 | Sakai City Soccer National Training Center, Japan | Afghanistan | 0-0 (draw) | Japan-Central Asia Exchange Tournament |
| 4 | 29 March 2015 | Sakai City Soccer National Training Center, Japan | Kyrgyzstan | 7-0 (won) | Japan-Central Asia Exchange Tournament |
