= Seia Kunori =

Japanese footballer (born 2001)

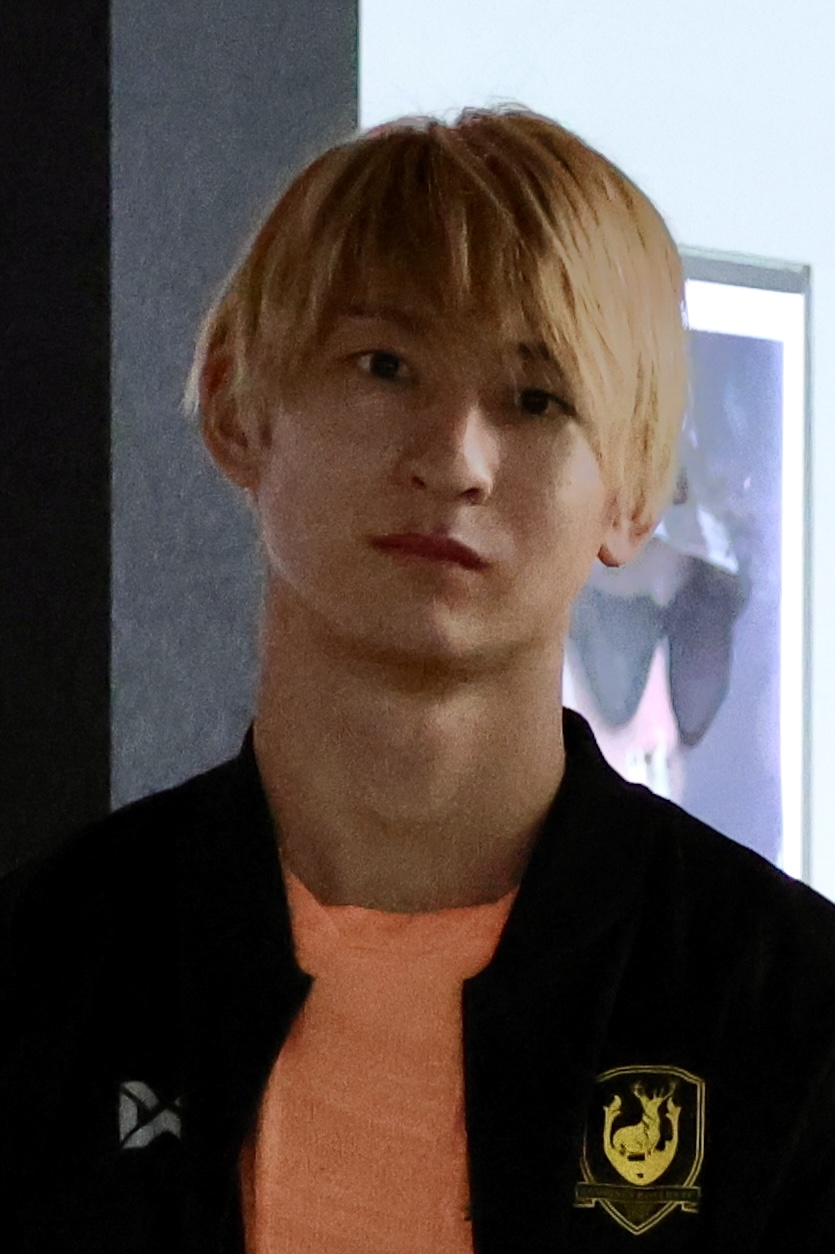
- Kunori with Tampines Rovers in 2024

Personal information
- Full name: Seia Kunori
- Date of birth: 31 March 2001 (age 25)
- Place of birth: Kyoto, Japan
- Height: 1.80 m (5 ft 11 in)
- Position: Striker

Team information
- Current team: Matsumoto Yamaga

Youth career
- Nishijin Chuo SSS
- Kyoto Sanga
- 2016–2018: Higashiyama High School

College career
Years	Team	Apps	(Gls)
2019–2022	Kansai University		

Senior career*
Years	Team	Apps	(Gls)
2023	Albirex Niigata (S)	28	(24)
2024–2025	Tampines Rovers	45	(25)
2025–2026	Bangkok United	31	(7)
2026	Tampines Rovers	0	(0)
2026–	Matsumoto Yamaga	0	(0)
- * Club domestic league appearances and goals as of 22 November 2025

Seia Kunori (久乗 聖亜, Kunori Seia; born 31 March 2001), also known in Singapore as, is a Japanese professional footballer who plays as a striker or attacking midfielder for J3 League club Matsumoto Yamaga.

== Early career ==
=== High school ===
While in junior high school, Kunori played for the academy of professional club Kyoto Sanga. He played as a midfielder, but his opportunities were limited due to the form of Shimpei Fukuoka and Genki Egawa. Having failed to establish himself in the Kyoto Sanga youth team, he moved to Higashiyama High School, where he was converted to a striker, and established himself in the team.

=== Kansai University ===
Kunori committed to playing football at Kansai University. He scored once in the 2022 Emperor's Cup, in a 2–0 win over FC Osaka.

== Club career ==
=== Albirex Niigata Singapore ===
In January 2023, it was announced that Kunori would join Singaporean club, Albirex Niigata (S) for the 2023 Singapore Premier League season. He made his debut in the Singapore Community Shield, scoring once in a 3–0 win against Hougang United.

On 5 April 2023, Kunori scored his first hat-trick for the club against Balestier Khalsa with Albirex Niigata (S) winning the game 6–1. On 3 August, he scored four goals against Geylang International in a 6–1 win in which he also get himself his second hat-trick of the season. Kunori helped the club to retained the league title and finishing as the third highest league goal scorer behind Maxime Lestienne and fellow countrymen, Ryoya Tanigushi with 21 goals in 23 league appearances. In the 2023 Singapore Cup fixtures on 24 September, he rescued his team from a 1–0 deficit to draw level at 1–1 against DPMM.

Kunori would go on to win the league title at the end of the season with Albirex Niigata. During the Football Association of Singapore Awards Night, he won the 2023 Young Player of the Year award and also being named in the league 2023 Singapore Premier League 'Team of the Year'.

=== Tampines Rovers ===
On 27 January 2024, Kunori moved to Tampines Rovers ahead of the 2024–25 season. He scored a brace on his debut on 12 May in a 3–1 over his former club Albirex Niigata (S). During the club 2024–25 AFC Champions League Two campaign on 18 September, Kunori scored a brace in a 4–2 lost against Thailand club Bangkok United at the Thammasat Stadium. Kunori went on to score 25 goals and contributing 14 assists in 45 appearances in all competition for the club.

=== Bangkok United ===
On 1 July 2025, Kunori joined Thai League 1 club Bangkok United. He scored a brace and recorded an assist on his debut for the club in a 3–2 win over Rayong on 17 August. Seven days later, Kunori scored in a 3–3 draw to Kanchanaburi Power.

=== Return to Tampines Rovers ===
On 4 July 2026, Kunori returned to Tampines Rovers. He played in the club pre-season tour in the 2026 Piala Presiden.

=== Matsumoto Yamaga ===
On 7 August 2026, J3 League club Matsumoto Yamaga activate Kunori release clause thus seeing him signing for the Japanese club.

== Style of play ==
A forward with good technique, skilful dribbler and pinpoint passing ability, Kunori is also highly regarded for his vision and situational awareness. He has been compared to fellow Japanese footballer Daichi Kamada for his style of play.

== Honours ==
=== Club ===
Albirex Niigata (S)

- Singapore Premier League: 2023
- Singapore Community Shield: 2023

=== Individual ===
- Singapore Premier League Young Player of the Year: 2023, 2024–25
- Singapore Premier League Team of the Year: 2023, 2024–25

== Career statistics ==
=== Club ===
As of 23 June 2026.

Appearances and goals by club, season and competition
Club	Season	League			Cup		AFC/ACL		Other		Total	
Club	Season	Division	Apps	Goals	Apps	Goals	Apps	Goals	Apps	Goals	Apps	Goals
Kansai University	2022	–			2 (Note: Appearances in the Emperor's Cup)	1	0	0	0	0	2	1
Albirex Niigata (S)	2023	Singapore Premier League	23	21	1	1	0	0	1 (Note: Appearances in the Singapore Community Shield)	1	25	23
Tampines Rovers	2024–25	Singapore Premier League	20	12	0	0	5	6	0	0	25	18
Bangkok United	2025–26	Thai League 1	15	5	4 (Note: 2 in FA Cup & 2 in League Cup)	1	8 (Note: 1 appearance in ACL Elite & 7 appearance in ACL2 & 4 appearance in Shopee Cup)	0	4 (Note: 4 appearance in Shopee Cup)	1 (Note: 1 goal in Shopee Cup)	31	7
Tampines Rovers	2026–27	Singapore Premier League	0	0	0	0	0	0	0	0	0	0
Career total			52	36	7	3	9	2	5	2	83	49
