= Josip Balić =

Croatian footballer

Personal information
- Full name: Josip Balić
- Date of birth: 8 July 1993 (age 33)
- Place of birth: Split, Croatia
- Height: 1.91 m (6 ft 3 in)
- Position: Defensive midfielder

Youth career
- 2004–2005: Dalmatinac Split
- 2006–2008: Omladinac Vranjic
- 2008–2012: Split

Senior career*
Years	Team	Apps	(Gls)
2012–2013	Split	0	(0)
2012	→ Dugopolje (loan)	10	(1)
2013–2014	Dugopolje	16	(0)
2014	Solin	10	(0)
2014–2015	Dugopolje	17	(4)
2015	Zavrč	3	(0)
2015–2016	Dugopolje	31	(6)
2016–2017	Radomlje	25	(1)
2017–2018	Krško	26	(2)
2018	Fastav Zlín	1	(0)
2019	Palanga	11	(0)
2020	Thanh Hóa	17	(1)
2021–2022	Sloboda Tuzla	27	(1)
2023	DPMM	11	(2)
- * Club domestic league appearances and goals as of 29 May 2023

Josip Balić (born 8 July 1993) is a Croatian professional footballer who plays as a midfielder.
