= Hirzi Zulfaqar Mahzan =

Bruneian footballer

Hirzi Zulfaqar
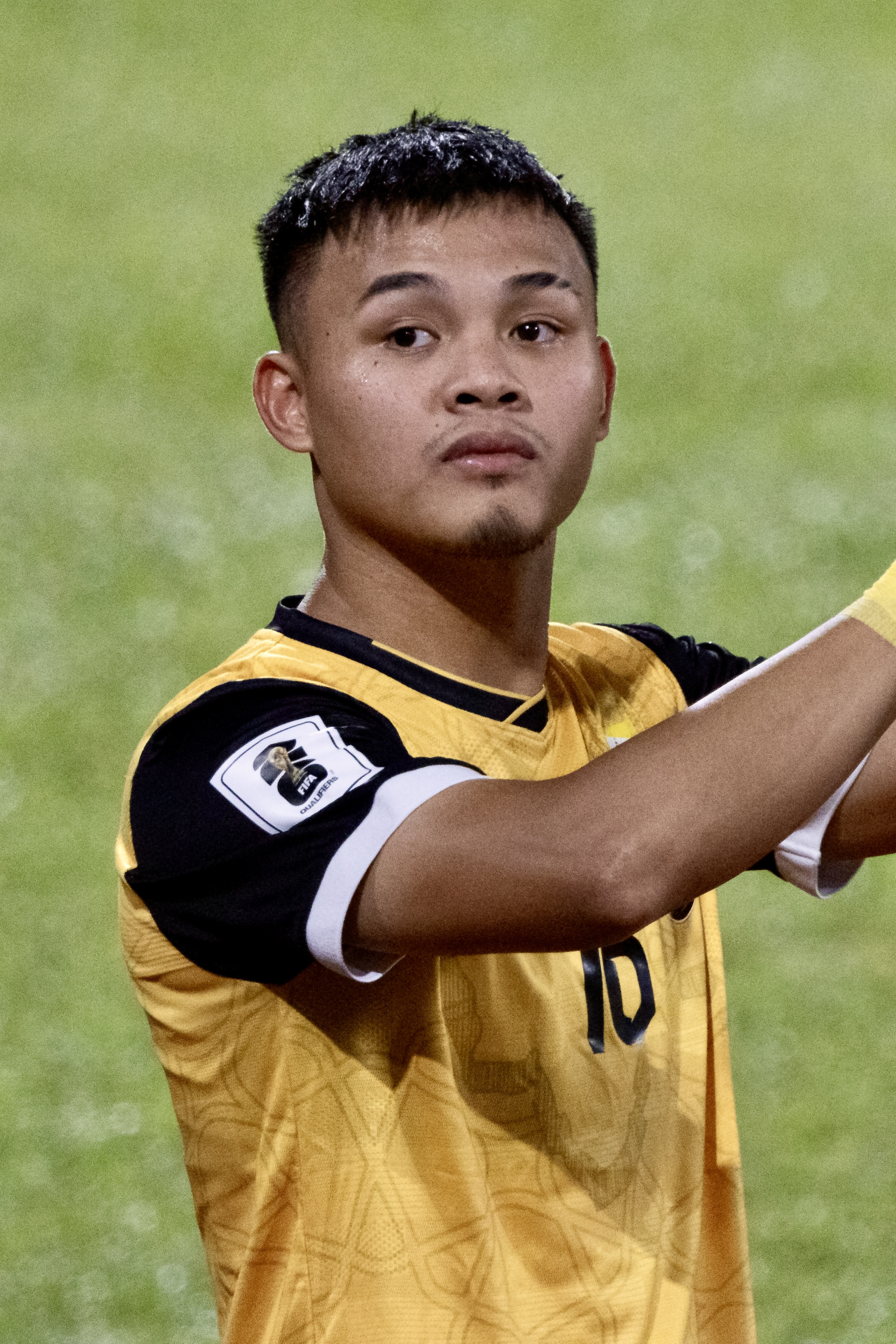
- Hirzi with Brunei in 2023

Personal information
- Full name: Mohammad Hirzi Zulfaqar bin Mahzan
- Date of birth: 13 August 2000 (age 26)
- Place of birth: Brunei
- Height: 1.78 m (5 ft 10 in)
- Position: Defender

Team information
- Current team: Wijaya FC
- Number: 29

Youth career
- 2015–2018: Tabuan Muda

Senior career*
Years	Team	Apps	(Gls)
2017–2018	Tabuan Muda 'A'		(2)
2022	Indera	0	(0)
2023	DPMM	7	(0)
2025	Kasuka	0	(0)
2025–2026	Kota Ranger	3	(0)
2026–	Wijaya	5	(1)

International career^{‡}
2015–2016	Brunei U16	9	(0)
2015–2018	Brunei U19	7	(0)
2023	Brunei	1	(0)
- * Club domestic league appearances and goals as of 8 November 2026 ‡ National team caps and goals as of 12 October 2023

Mohammad Hirzi Zulfaqar bin Mahzan (born 13 August 2000) is a Bruneian footballer who plays as a defender for Brunei Super League side Wijaya FC.

== Club career ==
Hirzi was a youth prospect who attended the National Football Association of Brunei Darussalam's grassroots development scheme the Tabuan Muda in 2015. He played for the Young Wasps' league side Tabuan Muda 'A' in the 2017–18 Brunei Super League.

After a period of focusing on his studies, Hirzi joined Indera SC for the 2022 Brunei FA Cup, the only competition held by FABD for the year. He helped Indera qualify for the knockout phase and played host to eventual winners DPMM FC in the quarter-finals.

Hirzi trialed and impressed at a local trial for new recruits for DPMM FC in January 2023 as part of preparations for their return to the Singapore Premier League in the 2023 season. He officially signed the terms on 28 February. He made his debut from the start against Tanjong Pagar United on 14 March, unfortunately scoring an own goal in his team's 2–1 victory. He managed to make seven appearances in his debut season, half of them from the starting lineup, before being released in the close season.

At the start of 2025, Hirzi trained with Kasuka FC and subsequently featured for the club at the 2025 Brunei FA Cup as well as the qualification matches of the 2025–26 ASEAN Club Championship and the 2025–26 AFC Challenge League in August. He then moved to Kota Ranger FC for the 2025–26 Brunei Super League that started in September, featuring in a handful of games. The following season, Hirzi moved to this sixth BSL club, Wijaya FC. He scored his first goal for Wijaya in a 4–3 victory over Lun Bawang FC on 25 October 2026.

== International career ==
=== Youth ===
Hirzi's first youth international tournament was the 2015 AFF U-16 Youth Championship hosted by Cambodia in July–August, where he joined the likes of Wafi Aminuddin and Nur Asyraffahmi Norsamri in the starting lineup. The team only gained a single point in five matches, with Hirzi playing in all of them. Some of the players who impressed were drafted to the under-19s for the 2016 AFC U-19 Championship qualification matches held in Myanmar that September, overhauling the team that competed in the 2015 AFF U-19 Youth Championship the previous month. Hirzi played in three out of four games, all ending in defeats.

The next year, Hirzi laced up with the under-16s for the 2016 AFF U-16 Youth Championship held in Cambodia that July. He played four matches in the campaign, tasting defeats in all of them.

In July 2018, Hirzi was selected for the 2018 AFF U-19 Youth Championship tournament held in Indonesia along with the team of Tabuan Muda. He featured in all four group games at the tournament.

=== Senior ===
In June 2023, Hirzi was called up to the senior international squad for the first time. He made his international debut on 12 October of that year away against Indonesia in the first leg of the 2026 World Cup and 2027 Asian Cup qualification, which ended in a 6–0 defeat. The round ended with Brunei's elimination from the 2026 World Cup in a 0–12 aggregate.

== Personal life ==
Hirzi is an alumnus of Laksamana College of Business, who captained its football team at a national inter-college tournament in 2021 and led them to become the winners.

Hirzi was a participant of the 2024 edition of the Ship for Southeast Asian and Japanese Youth Program.
