= Akmal Tursunbaev =

Uzbekistani footballer

Personal information
- Full name: Akmal Mustafaevich Tursunbaev
- Date of birth: 14 April 1993 (age 33)
- Place of birth: Yangiyoʻl, Uzbekistan
- Height: 1.87 m (6 ft 2 in)
- Position: Goalkeeper

Youth career
- Pakhtakor
- –2013: Bunyodkor

Senior career*
Years	Team	Apps	(Gls)
2013	Bunyodkor		
2013	→ Andijon (loan)		
2014–2015	Pakhtakor		
2016	Andijon	10	(0)
2017–2018	Buxoro	33	(0)
2019–2021	Metallurg Bekabad	10	(0)
2022	Turon Yaypan	8	(0)
2023	DPMM	6	(0)
2024	Buxoro	2	(0)

International career^{‡}
2010–2013	Uzbekistan U20	1	(0)
2013–2015	Uzbekistan U23	3	(0)
- * Club domestic league appearances and goals as of 27 March 2025 ‡ National team caps and goals as of 2 March 2023

Akmal Mustafaevich Tursunbaev (Uzbek: Akmal Mustafaevich Tursunbaev, Russian: Акмал Турсунбаев; born 14 July 1993) is an Uzbekistani footballer who plays as a goalkeeper.

== Club career ==
Having made his development at Uzbek football powerhouses Pakhtakor and Bunyodkor, Tursunbaev went on loan to FK Andijon of the Uzbekistan First League in 2013, and won promotion to the 2014 Uzbek League. He was transferred to Pakhtakor where he played as a backup goalkeeper as the Tashkent club twice became league champions while he was there.

He subsequently returned to Andijon but could not save them from relegation at the end of the 2016 Uzbek League season. He moved to other Higher League clubs such as FK Buxoro and Metallurg Bekabad before dropping a division to play for FK Turon Yaypan where they finished third in the 2022 season. He played in the promotion/relegation play-off against Lokomotiv Tashkent on 25 November and won 2–1, sending Turon to the top flight.

Tursunbaev moved to Bruneian club DPMM FC after completing a trial in January 2023. He put pen to paper on 28 February of that year. He made his debut away against Lion City Sailors on 3 March which resulted in a defeat to the Bruneian side 3–1. After only featuring for six games, he was released by the club on 1 June.

In February 2024 he returned to FK Buxoro playing in the 2024 Uzbekistan Pro League.

== International career ==
Tursunbaev was part of the national youth setup of his country from 2010 to 2014. He was part of the Uzbekistan under-20 squad for the 2013 FIFA U-20 World Cup held in Turkey. He then played three games for the under-23s for the 2016 AFC U-23 Championship qualification matches hosted by Bangladesh. He kept clean sheets against India and the host nation.
