= Eddy Shahrol Omar =

Bruneian footballer (born 2003)

Eddy Shahrol
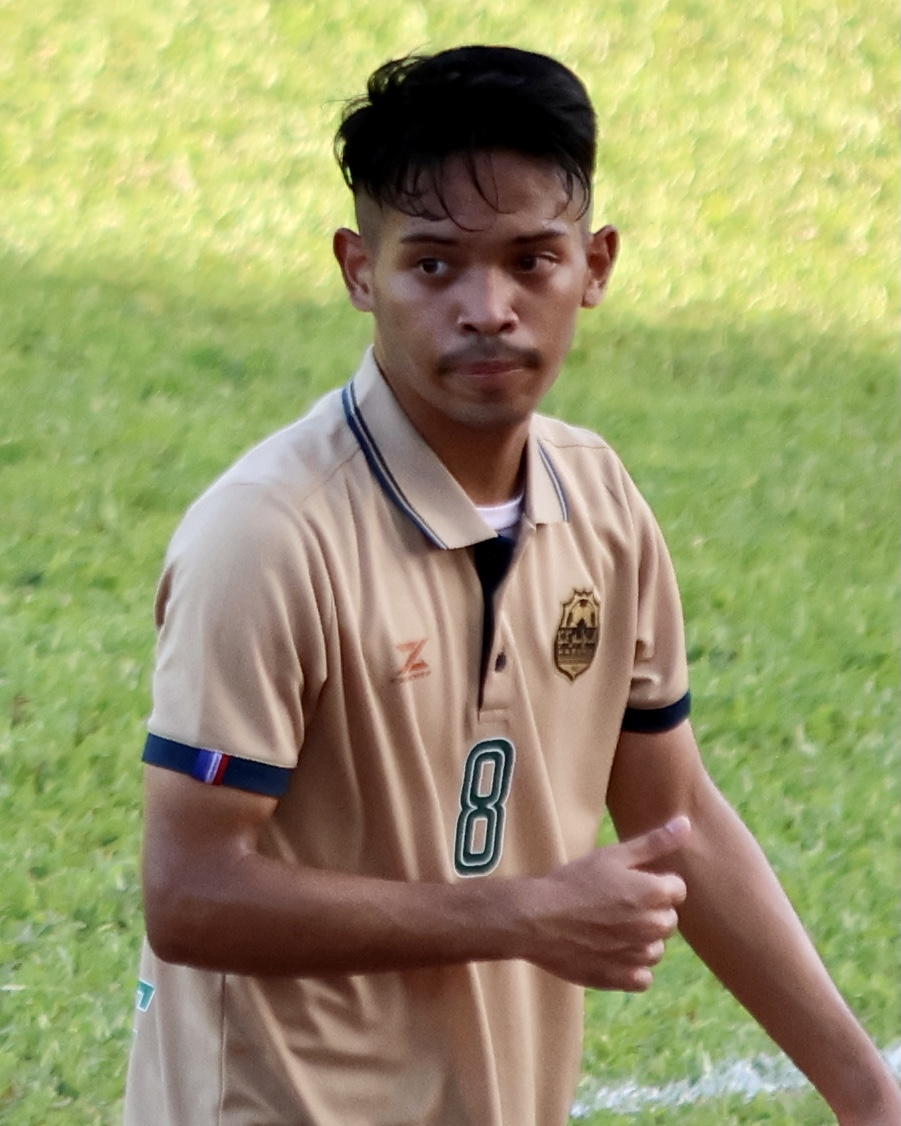
- Eddy with Kasuka in 2022

Personal information
- Full name: Mohammad Eddy Shahrol @ Khairol Izzat bin Haji Omar
- Date of birth: 4 October 2003 (age 23)
- Place of birth: Brunei
- Position: Midfielder

Youth career
- 2011–2014: PIP
- 2013–2020: Tabuan Muda
- 2015: Indera
- 2024: Wasan

Senior career*
Years	Team	Apps	(Gls)
2018–2020	Tabuan Muda		(1)
2021–2022	Kasuka		(1)
2023	DPMM	5	(0)

International career
2017	Brunei U16	7	(1)
2019–2022	Brunei U20	15	(1)
2022–2023	Brunei U23	3	(0)
2022	Brunei	1	(0)
- * Club domestic league appearances and goals

Mohammad Eddy Shahrol @ Khairol Izzat bin Haji Omar (born 4 October 2003) is a Bruneian former footballer who played as a midfielder.

== Club career ==
=== Early career ===
The youngest son of distinguished grassroots football coach Omar Jamil, Eddy was naturally raised in a football-rich environment, training at a very young age at Projek Ikan Pusu where his father holds the Head Coach position. He was usurped into Tabuan Muda, the national youth football scheme of NFABD when he turned 13. He also had a training stint at Indera SC's youth group when his father became their head coach in 2015.

Eddy featured for Tabuan Muda in the 2018–19 Brunei Premier League season, scoring his first ever league goal against Rainbow FC on 4 February 2019. The Young Wasps finished in second place behind the 'B' side of DPMM FC. With the expansion of the Brunei Super League which included the current Tabuan team in the top flight, Eddy played with them for the 2020 season but the league was abandoned after only two matches due to the COVID-19 pandemic.

=== Kasuka ===
Eddy transferred to ambitious Kasuka FC for the 2021 Brunei Super League campaign, who were anticipating their continental debut at the 2021 AFC Cup which was later cancelled. He scored his first league goal for Kasuka against BAKES FC on 25 July 2021 in a 9–0 win. The following month, the league was stopped and later abandoned when local transmissions of COVID-19 were detected in the country, forcing heavy restrictions on public activity such as sports.

After said restrictions were gradually eased in 2022, the 2022 Brunei FA Cup was held from August to November with 32 Bruneian teams including Kasuka taking part. Eddy contributed two goals in the latter knockout stages and helped Kasuka go all the way to the final, where they were beaten 2–1 by DPMM FC.

=== DPMM ===
Eddy was one of three young players who were selected by DPMM FC in a trial held in January 2023. He officially signed for the royalty-owned club on 28 February.

Eddy made his DPMM FC debut as a second-half substitute in a 2–3 loss to Hougang United on 7 June 2023. He made eight substitute appearances in all competitions before being released in early 2024.

== International career ==
=== Youth ===
Eddy played his first international competition with the Brunei under-15s at the 2017 AFF U-15 Championship held in Chonburi, Thailand that July. He played a total of four games out of five, only missing the 2–0 victory over Cambodia on 16 July. Brunei recorded five points for the tournament, finishing in fourth place in their group out of 6 teams. Two months later, he was in the same squad for the 2018 AFC U-16 Championship qualification matches held in Chinese Taipei. He started the match against Macau and scored the fourth goal in a 4–0 win. He was a substitute in the next game against the hosts but the Young Wasps conceded a late goal to lose 1–2. A 9–0 drubbing by North Korea would ensue, whereby Eddy did not take part in the action. The final match for Brunei was a 1–2 victory against Hong Kong which saw Eddy restored to the starting lineup.

Eddy was selected for the under-19s competing at the 2019 AFF U-18 Youth Championship held in Vietnam in August of that year. He played in four of the matches where Brunei were defeated in each of their group games. In the following November, he made the same team for the 2020 AFC U-19 Championship qualifying held in Cambodia. He started the first match against the Northern Marianas where he opened the scoring in the 12-minute mark, helping the Young Wasps to a 3–4 victory. Heavy defeats against Thailand and Malaysia scuppered their confidence from that victory, and a final 0–3 loss to Cambodia condemned Eddy and his teammates to a third successive defeat in the group.

Eddy was announced as part of the Brunei under-23s playing in the 2022 AFF U-23 Championship held in Cambodia that February, but saw no game time. He was back with the U19 setup in July, captaining the team for the 2022 AFF U-19 Youth Championship hosted by Indonesia. He played in all five games in which Brunei failed to score a single goal in those five defeats. He continued his captaincy with the Young Wasps at the September 2023 AFC U-20 Asian Cup qualifying held in Kyrgyzstan. They were soundly beaten by their opponents which include the UAE, Iran and the host nation.

Eddy returned to the U23 setup in September 2023 for the 2024 AFC U-23 Asian Cup qualifying matches against hosts Jordan, Oman and Syria, starting in midfield in all three matches.

=== Senior ===
Eddy received a callup for the full national team in March 2022 for the international friendly against Laos away in Vientiane. He replaced Abdul Hariz Herman on 83 minutes in the match, thus making his international debut. The Wasps were beaten 3–2 in that fixture.

== Personal life ==
Eddy is the son of Omar Jamil, an experienced grassroots-level football coach. He and his brothers follow their father's footsteps in becoming football coaches, namely Adi Shahirol Izzat and Ikhmarol Izzat. The latter coached Eddy along with the Brunei under-16s in 2018.

Eddy played for Street United of the Brunei Premier Futsal League in 2024.

Eddy currently runs an event space rental company in Kiulap.
