= 2023 Hougang United FC season =

Hougang United
2023 season
- Chairman: Bill Ng
- Head coach: Firdaus Kassim
- Stadium: Jalan Besar Stadium
- Top goalscorer: League: Hazzuwan Halim (3); All: Hazzuwan Halim (3)
Home colours	Away colours

The 2023 season was Hougang United's 26th consecutive season in the Singapore Premier League. After finishing third in the 2021 Singapore Premier League, Hougang qualified for the 2023–24 AFC Cup.

The women team played in the Women Premier league.

== Review ==
After winning the 2022 Singapore Cup, Hougang was thought to be a contender for the SPL champion.

On 6 April 2023, Hougang lost to Tanjong Pagar United FC 1–2 and was second bottom of the SPL table with the same points as Young Lions but with a better goal difference.

On 17 April, head of youth, Marko Kraljević replaced head coach Firdaus Kassim as interim head coach after the club failed to win any matches since they won the opening match in the 2023 Singapore Premier League season. Firdaus took over Kraljević's position as head of youth.

== Squad ==
=== Singapore Premier League ===
No.	Name	Nationality	Date of birth (age)	Previous club	Contract since	Contract end
Goalkeepers
19	Zaiful Nizam ^{O30}	(Singapore)	24 July 1987 (age 38)	(Singapore) Geylang International	2023	2023
25	Zainol Gulam ^{O30}	(Singapore)	4 February 1992 (age 34)	(Singapore) Geylang International	2022	2023
Defenders
2	Anders Aplin ^{O30}	(Singapore) (England)	21 June 1991 (age 35)	(Singapore) Geylang International	2020	2023
3	Jordan Nicolas Vestering ^{U23}	(Singapore) (Netherlands)	25 September 2000 (age 25)	(Singapore) NFA U18	2018	2023
4	Nazrul Nazari ^{O30}	(Singapore)	11 February 1991 (age 35)	(Singapore) LionsXII	2016	2023
5	Naoki Kuriyama	(Japan)	8 December 1990 (age 35)	(Japan) Ehime FC (J3)	2023	2023
6	Kazuma Takayama	(Japan)	14 July 1996 (age 29)	(Japan) Kataller Toyama (J3)	2023	2023
17	Irwan Shah ^{O30}	(Singapore)	2 November 1988 (age 37)	(Singapore) Tampines Rovers	2023	2023
36	Abdil Qaiyyim Mutalib ^{O30}	(Singapore)	14 May 1989 (age 37)	(Singapore) Geylang International	2023	2023
Midfielders
8	Shahdan Sulaiman ^{O30}	(Singapore)	9 May 1988 (age 38)	(Singapore) Lion City Sailors	2023	2023
10	Kristijan Krajcek	(Croatia)	1 October 1993 (age 32)	(Singapore) Balestier Khalsa	2022	2023
14	Umar Ramle	(Singapore)	2 May 1996 (age 30)	(Singapore) Geylang International	2023	2023
16	Ajay Robson ^{U23}	(Singapore)	6 December 2003 (age 22)	Youth Team	2023	2023
18	Idraki Adnan	(Singapore)	13 March 1999 (age 27)	(Singapore) Young Lions FC	2021	2023
24	Amir Zalani	(Singapore)	4 December 1996 (age 29)	(Singapore) Home United	2021	2023
Strikers
7	Amy Recha ^{O30}	(Singapore) (Indonesia)	13 May 1992 (age 34)	(Singapore) Geylang International	2022	2023
9	Fairoz Hassan ^{O23}	(Singapore)	26 November 1988 (age 37)	(Japan) Albirex Niigata (S)	2023	2023
11	Hazzuwan Halim	(Singapore)	2 February 1994 (age 32)	(Singapore) Geylang International	2023	2023
22	Gabriel Quak ^{O30}	(Singapore)	22 December 1990 (age 35)	(Singapore) Lion City Sailors	2023	2023
23	Sahil Suhaimi ^{O30}	(Singapore)	8 July 1992 (age 33)	(Singapore) Warriors FC	2020	2023
44	Đorđe Maksimović	(Serbia)	9 October 1999 (age 26)	(Serbia) FK Radnicki 1923 (S1)	2023	2023
Players who left for NS during the season
25	Aizil Yazid ^{U23}	(Singapore)	24 December 2004 (age 21)	(Japan) Albirex Niigata (S)	2021	2026
55	Farhan Zulkifli ^{U23}	(Singapore)	10 November 2002 (age 23)	(Singapore) Home United U19	2019	2025
	Syafi’ie Redzuan ^{U21}	(Singapore)	25 October 2003 (age 22)			
Players who left during the season
32	Brian Ferreira	(Argentina) (Iraq)	24 May 1994 (age 32)	(Mexico) Cafetaleros de Chiapas (M3)	2023	2023
37	Zulfahmi Arifin ^{O30}	(Singapore)	5 October 1991 (age 34)	(Thailand) Sukhothai F.C.	2022	2023

=== Women's Squad ===
No.	Name	Nationality	Date of birth (age)	Previous club	Contract since	Contract end
Goalkeepers
1	Olivia Lee Jia Min	(Singapore)				
23	Belle Jaffar	(Singapore)		(Singapore) Balestier Khalsa (W)	2023	2023
28	Azreanna Azlan	(Singapore)	24 August 2005 (age 20)	(Singapore)	2023	2023
Defenders
2	Rosnani Azman	(Singapore)	22 May 1997 (age 29)	(Japan) Kibi International	2023	2023
3	Angelyn Pang Yen Ping	(Singapore)	13 April 1991 (age 35)	(Singapore) Tiong Bahru FC (W)	2023	2023
4	Nurul Asyiqin	(Singapore)		(Singapore) Tiong Bahru FC (W)	2023	2023
5	Jacklyn Lee Pei Xian	(Singapore)		(Singapore) Tiong Bahru FC (W)	2023	2023
6	Claire Merrow-Smith	(Singapore)		(Singapore)	2023	2023
12	Carey Lee Shi Min	(Singapore)		(Singapore)	2023	2023
14	Leo Huang	(Singapore)		(Singapore) Tiong Bahru FC (W)	2023	2023
17	Victoria Lee Chun Hui	(Singapore)		(Singapore) Tiong Bahru FC (W)	2023	2023
19	Clara Wong Si Lin	(Singapore)		(Singapore)	2023	2023
20	Rena Ang En Ting	(Singapore)		(Singapore) Tiong Bahru FC (W)	2023	2023
Midfielders
7	Deborah Chin Ngeet Ling	(Singapore)	21 April 1988 (age 38)	(Singapore) Tiong Bahru FC (W)	2023	2023
11	Winette Lim Siu	(Singapore)	20 May 1999 (age 27)	(Singapore) Tiong Bahru FC (W)	2023	2023
18	Nurul Ardian Baharrudin	(Singapore)				
21	Rochelle Chan Wan Wen	(Singapore)	21 August 1995 (age 30)	(Singapore) Tiong Bahru FC (W)	2023	2023
22	Genevieve Lee Min	(Singapore)		(Singapore)	2023	2023
27	Riddle Reneelyn Sison	(Philippines) (Singapore)		(Singapore) Tiong Bahru FC (W)	2023	2023
Strikers
8	Raudhah Kamis	(Singapore)	4 March 1999 (age 27)	(Singapore) Tiong Bahru FC (W)	2023	2023
9	Levyn Wong Si Min	(Singapore)		(Singapore)	2023	2023
10	Rachel Chan Ye Ling	(Singapore)	25 August 2004 (age 21)	(Singapore) Tiong Bahru FC (W)	2023	2023
15	Siti Wan Nabilah	(Singapore)	15 May 1993 (age 33)	(Singapore) Tiong Bahru FC (W)	2023	2023
16	Nicole Lim Yan Xiu	(Singapore)	10 April 2002 (age 24)	(Singapore) Lion City Sailors (W)	2023	2023
25	Clara Lau Shi Hui	(Singapore)	23 September 1997 (age 28)	(Singapore) Tiong Bahru FC (W)	2023	2023
Players who left mid-season
23	Erlinawaty Dewi	(Singapore)		(Singapore) Balestier Khalsa (W)	2023	2023

== Coaching staff ==
Position	Name	Ref.
General Manager	(Singapore) Matthew Tay	
Team Manager	(Singapore) (Nigeria) Robert Eziakor	
Head Coach (Men)	(Croatia) Marko Kraljević (Interim)	
Head Coach (Women)	(Singapore) G.Sivaraj	
Assistant Coach & Head of Youth (COE) & U21 Coach	(Singapore) (Nigeria) Robert Eziakor	
Goalkeeping Coach	(Australia) Scott Starr	
U17 Coach	(Singapore) Firdaus Kassim (Singapore) Tan Puay Guan	
U15 Coach	(Japan) Yuki Fujimoto	
Strength & Monitoring Coach	(Singapore) Syaqir Sulaiman	
Sports Trainer	(Singapore) Thomas Pang	
Physiotherapist	(Singapore) Ain Hassan (Singapore) Daniel Tan (Singapore) Shoban Rahul	
Equipment Team	(Singapore) Richard Lim (Singapore) Wan Azlan Bin Wan Adanan	

== Transfers ==
=== In ===
Preseason

Position	Player	Transferred From	Team	Ref
GK	(Singapore) Zaiful Nizam	(Singapore) Geylang International	First Team	Free (Note: Zaiful didn't exercise his contract option for 2023)
DF	(Singapore) Irwan Shah	(Singapore) Tampines Rovers	First Team	Free
DF	(Japan) Kazuma Takayama	(Japan) Omiya Ardija (J2)	First Team	Free
DF	(Japan) Naoki Kuriyama	(Japan) Ehime FC (J3)	First Team	Free
DF	(Singapore) Brant Tan Jun Rong	(Singapore) Lion City Sailors U21	U21	Free
DF	(Singapore) Nasrul Pujiyono	(Singapore) Geylang International U21	U21	Free
MF	(Singapore) Umar Ramle	(Singapore) Geylang International	First Team	Free
MF	(Singapore) Shahdan Sulaiman	(Singapore) Lion City Sailors	First Team	Free
MF	(Argentina) (Iraq) Brian Ferreira	(Mexico) Cafetaleros de Chiapas (M3)	First Team	Free
MF	(Singapore) Hariysh Krishnakumar	(Singapore) Balestier Khalsa	U21	Free
MF	(Singapore) Dylan Choo	(Singapore) Tanjong Pagar United U21	U21	Free
FW	(Singapore) Gabriel Quak Jun Yi	(Singapore) Lion City Sailors	First Team	Free
FW	(Singapore) Hazzuwan Halim	(Singapore) Geylang International	First Team	Free
FW	(Singapore) Fairoz Hasan	(Japan) Albirex Niigata (S)	First Team	Free
FW	(Singapore) Nicole Lim Yan Xiu	(Singapore) Lion City Sailors (W)	Women	Free.

Mid-season

Position	Player	Transferred From	Team	Ref
FW	(Serbia) Djordje Maksimovic	(Serbia) FK Radnički 1923 (S1)	First Team	Free
DF	(Singapore) Abdil Qaiyyim Mutalib	(Singapore) Geylang International	First Team	Free
MF	(Singapore) Syed Adel Alsree	(Singapore) Lion City Sailors U21	U21	Free

Note 1:

=== Loan Return ===
Preseason

Position	Player	Transferred From	Ref
MF	(Singapore) Nor Hakim Redzuan	(Singapore) Young Lions FC	Season loan

Note 1: Nor Hakim Redzuan release after his return

=== Out ===
Preseason

Position	Player	Transferred To	Team	Ref
GK	(Singapore) Mukundan Maran	(Singapore) Balestier Khalsa	First Team	Free. 2 years contract till 2024
GK	(Singapore) Ridhuan Barudin	(Singapore) Tampines Rovers	First Team	Free
DF	(Singapore) Lionel Tan	(Singapore) Lion City Sailors	First Team	Undisclosed
DF	(Singapore) Nazhiim Harman	(Singapore) Geylang International	First Team	Free
DF	(Singapore) Kishon Philip	(Singapore)	First Team	Free
DF	(Singapore) Muhaimin Suhaimi	Retired	First Team	Free
DF	(Singapore) Faiz Salleh	Retired	First Team	N.A.
DF	(Singapore) Yeong Siew Mei	(Singapore) Still Aerion	Women	Free
DF	(Singapore) Foo Shini	(Singapore) Still Aerion	Women	Free
DF	(Singapore) Deanna Lim	(Singapore) Still Aerion	Women	Free
MF	(Singapore) Afiq Noor	(Singapore) Tiong Bahru FC (SFL1)	First Team	Free
MF	(Singapore) Fabian Kwok	(Singapore) Balestier Khalsa	First Team	Free
MF	(Japan) Kaishu Yamazaki	(Malta) Mosta F.C.	First Team	Free
MF	(Brazil) André Moritz	Retired	First Team	Free
MF	(Singapore) Jarrel Ong	(Japan) Albirex Niigata (S)	U21	Free.
MF	(Singapore) Nor Hakim Redzuan	(Singapore)	U21	Free
MF	(Singapore) Dhaniyah Qasimah	(Singapore) Tanjong Pagar United (W)	Women	Free
FW	(Brazil) Pedro Bortoluzo	(Brazil) Portuguesa	First Team	Free
FW	(Singapore) Shawal Anuar	(Singapore) Lion City Sailors	First Team	Free
FW	(Singapore) Shahfiq Ghani	(Singapore) Geylang International	First Team	Free
FW	(Singapore) Shahril Ishak	Retired	First Team	Free

Mid-season

Position	Player	Transferred To	Team	Ref
MF	(Argentina) (Iraq) Brian Ferreira	(Uruguay) La Luz F.C.	First Team	Free
MF	(Singapore) Zulfahmi Arifin	(Indonesia) Bhayangkara	First Team	Free. 6 months contract till 30 April 2024

Note 1:

=== Loan out ===
Preseason

Position	Player	Transferred To	Ref
GK	(Singapore) Heng How Meng	(Singapore) SAFSA	NS till 2023
DF	(Singapore) Sahffee Jubpre	(Singapore) SAFSA	NS till 2023
MF	(Singapore) Nikesh Singh Sidhu	(Singapore) SAFSA	NS till 2023
GK	(Singapore) Aizil Yazid	(Singapore) SAFSA	NS till Jan 2025
MF	(Singapore) Farhan Zulkifli	(Singapore) SAFSA	NS till Jan 2025
MF	(Singapore) Hafizzuan Riduan	(Singapore) SAFSA	NS till Jan 2025
MF	(Singapore) Woo Chun Wei	(Singapore) SAFSA	NS till Jan 2025
MF	(Singapore) (Wales) Harhys Stewart	(Singapore) Young Lions FC	Season loan

Note 1: Harhys Stewart returns on loan to GYL for another season.

=== Retained / Extension ===
Position	Player	Ref
GK	(Singapore) Zainol Gulam	1-year extension till 2023
GK	(Singapore) Aizil Yazid	3 years extension till 2025
DF	(Singapore) Anders Aplin	1-year extension till 2023
DF	(Singapore) Nazrul Nazari	1-year extension till 2023
DF	(Singapore) Jordan Nicolas Vestering	1-year extension till 2023
DF	(Singapore) Lionel Tan	1-year extension till 2023
MF	(Singapore) Idraki Adnan	1-year extension till 2023
MF	(Singapore) Zulfahmi Arifin	1-year extension till 2023
MF	(Croatia) Kristijan Krajcek	1-year extension till 2023
FW	(Singapore) Sahil Suhaimi	1-year extension till 2023
FW	(Singapore) Amir Zalani	1-year extension till 2023
FW	(Singapore) Amy Recha	1-year extension till 2023
FW	(Singapore) Sahil Suhaimi	1-year extension till 2023

== Friendlies ==
=== Pre-Season Friendly ===
Win Draw Loss

First Team

21 January 2023 1	Singapore Football Club	v	(Singapore) Hougang United	Jalan Besar
				Stadium: Jalan Besar Stadium

February 2023 2	Lion City Sailors (Singapore)	2–1	(Singapore) Hougang United	Bishan
				Stadium: Bishan Stadium

== Team statistics ==
=== Appearances and goals ===
As of 14 Dec 2022

No.	Pos.	Player	SPL		Singapore Cup		Charity Shield		AFC Cup		Total	
No.	Pos.	Player	Apps.	Goals	Apps.	Goals	Apps.	Goals	Apps.	Goals	Apps.	Goals
2	DF	(Singapore) (England) Anders Aplin	13+3	0	6	0	0	0	5	0	25	0
3	DF	(Singapore) (Netherlands) Jordan Vestering	14+1	1	5+1	0	0	0	2+2	0	24	1
4	DF	(Singapore) Nazrul Nazari	20+1	2	6	0	1	0	6	0	32	2
5	DF	(Japan) Naoki Kuriyama	19	0	6	0	1	0	6	0	30	0
6	DF	(Japan) Kazuma Takayama	23	2	6	2	1	0	6	1	34	4
7	FW	(Singapore) Amy Recha	14+6	6	1+5	1	0+1	0	2+4	0	31	7
8	MF	(Singapore) Shahdan Sulaiman	0+3	0	2	0	0	0	4	0	9	0
9	FW	(Singapore) Fairoz Hassan	0+10	0	0	0	0	0	0	0	10	0
10	MF	(Croatia) Kristijan Krajcek	20	9	1	0	1	0	1	0	23	9
11	FW	(Singapore) Hazzuwan Halim	14+5	4	4+1	0	1	0	4+1	0	30	4
14	MF	(Singapore) Umar Ramle	1+3	0	0	0	0	0	0	0	4	0
16	MF	(Singapore) Ajay Robson	9+6	0	4	0	1	0	2+1	0	21	0
17	DF	(Singapore) Irwan Shah	21+2	0	5	0	1	0	6	0	33	0
18	MF	(Singapore) Idraki Adnan	0+2	0	0+2	0	0	0	0+1	0	2	0
19	GK	(Singapore) Zaiful Nizam	22	0	6	0	1	0	5	0	32	0
22	FW	(Singapore) Gabriel Quak	10+13	6	0+3	0	1	0	1+1	1	29	7
23	FW	(Singapore) Sahil Suhaimi	16+8	2	5	0	0+1	0	2+4	0	34	2
24	FW	(Singapore) Amir Zalani	3+14	0	0+1	0	0	0	0+4	0	22	0
25	GK	(Singapore) Zainol Gulam	2	0	0	0	0	0	1	0	3	0
36	DF	(Singapore) Abdil Qaiyyim Mutalib	2	0	2+2	0	0	0	4	0	8	0
44	FW	(Serbia) Djordje Maksimovic	10	4	5+1	5	0	0	6	4	20	13
55	DF	(Singapore) Rauf Sanizal	0	0	0	0	0	0	0+1	0	0	0
58	FW	(Singapore) Louka Vaissierre Tan	5+1	0	1+4	1	0	0	0+4	0	13	1
60	MF	(Singapore) Raimi Ishraq	0+1	0	0	0	0	0	0	0	1	0
63	MF	(Singapore) Hariysh Krishnakumar	0	0	0	0	0	0	0	0	0	0
68	DF	(Singapore) (South Africa) Iryan Fandi	0+2	0	0+2	0	0	0	0+2	0	5	0
74	DF	(Singapore) (Indonesia) Nasrul Pujiyono	0+1	0	0	0	0	0	0	0	1	0
Players who have played this season but had left the club or on loan to other club
32	MF	(Argentina) (Iraq) Brian Ferreira	7+2	0	0	0	1	0	0	0	9	0
37	MF	(Singapore) Zulfahmi Arifin	19	0	2	0	1	0	3	0	25	0

== Competitions ==
=== Overview ===
Competition	Record							
Competition	P	W	D	L	GF	GA	GD	Win %
Singapore Premier League	23	9	2	12	37	52	−15	39.13
Charity Shield	1	0	0	1	0	3	−3	0.00
Singapore Cup	0	0	0	0	0	0	+0	—
AFC Cup	0	0	0	0	0	0	+0	—
Total	24	9	2	13	37	55	−18	37.50

Results summary (SPL)

Overall								Home						Away					
Pld	W	D	L	GF	GA	GD	Pts	W	D	L	GF	GA	GD	W	D	L	GF	GA	GD
23	9	2	12	37	52	−15	29	3	2	7	15	33	−18	6	0	5	22	19	+3

=== Charity Shield ===
19 February 2023 Charity Shield	Albirex Niigata (S) (Japan)	3–0	(Singapore) Hougang United	Jalan Besar
	Seia Kunori 57' (pen.); Shodai Yokoyama 72'; Riku Fukashiro 74' (yellow card) 90'; Nicky Melvin Singh (yellow card) 48'	Report	Brian Ferreira (yellow card) 41'; Nazrul Nazari (yellow card) 76'; Amy Recha (yellow card) 90+1'	Stadium: Jalan Besar Stadium; Referee: Jansen Foo

=== Singapore Premier League ===
Win Draw Loss

26 February 2023 1	Balestier Khalsa (Singapore)	2–3	(Singapore) Hougang United	Bishan
	Daniel Goh 60' (yellow card) 18'; Ryoya Tanigushi 73'	Report	Kristijan Krajcek 22'; Kazuma Takayama 50'; Amy Recha 87' (yellow card) 29'; Nazrul Nazari (yellow card) 83'	Stadium: Bishan Stadium; Referee: Mohd Taqi

5 March 2023 2	Geylang International (Singapore)	2–1	(Singapore) Hougang United	Tampines
	Vincent Bezecourt 72' 85' (yellow card) 85'; Huzaifah Aziz (yellow card) 47'; Gareth Low (yellow card) 90'	Report	Sahil Suhaimi 16'; Irwan Shah (yellow card) 20'; Brian Ferreira (yellow card) 40'; Kazuma Takayama (yellow card) 90'	Stadium: Our Tampines Hub; Referee: Ahmad A'qashah

15 March 2023 3	Albirex Niigata (S) (Japan)	2–0	(Singapore) Hougang United	Jurong East
	Seia Kunori 45+1' 90+3'; Tadanari Lee (yellow card) 25'; Shuto Komaki (yellow card) 40'; Keito Komatsu (yellow card) 86'	Report		Stadium: Jurong East Stadium; Referee: Taufik Thana

18 March 2023 4	Young Lions FC (Singapore)	2–1	(Singapore) Hougang United	Jalan Besar
	Jared Gallagher 81'; Harhys Stewart 83'; Ilhan Noor (yellow card) 31'; Jacob Mahler (yellow card) 90+5'	Report	Hazzuwan Halim 44'; Naoki Kuriyama (yellow card) 38'; Nazrul Nazari (yellow card) 63'	Stadium: Jalan Besar Stadium; Referee: Clarence Leow

31 March 2023 5	Hougang United (Singapore)	0–3	(Brunei) DPMM FC	Jalan Besar
	Zulfahmi Arifin (yellow card) 69'; Nazrul Nazari (yellow card) 85'; Amir Zailani (yellow card) 87'; Fairoz Hassan (yellow card) 90+6'; Amy Recha (yellow card) 90+7'	Report	Hakeme Yazid Said 31' (yellow card) 17'; Yura Indera Putera Yunos 48' (yellow card) 45'; Josip Balić 88'; Hanif Hamir (yellow card) 74'; Ángel Martínez (yellow card) 86'; Hanif Farhan Azman (yellow card) 90+3'	Stadium: Jalan Besar Stadium; Referee: Farhad Mohamed

6 April 2023 6	Hougang United (Singapore)	1–2	(Singapore) Tanjong Pagar United	Jalan Besar
	Hazzuwan Halim 42'; Amy Recha (yellow card) 58'	Report	Marin Mudražija 65' (pen.); Khairul Amri 75'; Blake Ricciuto (yellow card) 68'; Kenji Syed Rusydi (yellow card) 90'	Stadium: Jalan Besar Stadium; Referee: Mohd Taqi

10 April 2023 7	Hougang United (Singapore)	0–5	(Singapore) Lion City Sailors	Jalan Besar
	Kristijan Krajcek (yellow card) 5'; Sahil Suhaimi (yellow card) 41'; Brian Ferreira (yellow card) 76'	Report	Maxime Lestienne 6' 90+1'; Abdul Rasaq 44' 72'; Diego Lopes 88' (yellow card) 58'; Zharfan Rohaizad (yellow card) 63'	Stadium: Jalan Besar Stadium; Referee: Ahmad A'qashah

16 April 2023 8	Hougang United (Singapore)	1–1	(Singapore) Tampines Rovers	Jalan Besar
	Hazzuwan Halim 62' (pen.); Nazrul Nazari (yellow card) 5'; Ajay Robson (yellow card) 66'; Zulfahmi Arifin (yellow card) 90+10'; Iryan Fandi (yellow card) 90+13'; Scott Starr (yellow card) 90+13'	Report	Boris Kopitović 90+15' (pen.); Shuya Yamashita (yellow card) 56'; Taufik Suparno (yellow card) 90'	Stadium: Jalan Besar Stadium; Referee: Jansen Foo; Man of the Match: Boris Kopitović

6 May 2023 9	Hougang United (Singapore)	0–5	(Japan) Albirex Niigata (S)	Jalan Besar
	Kazuma Takayama (yellow card) 17'; Hazzuwan Halim (yellow card) 82'	Report	Asahi Yokokawa 14' 33'; Koki Kawachi 26' 90+3'; Keito Komatsu 50'	Stadium: Jalan Besar Stadium; Referee: Farhad Mohamed

12 May 2023 10	Hougang United (Singapore)	3–2	(Singapore) Geylang International	Jalan Besar
	Jordan Vestering 1'; Gabriel Quak 81' (pen.); Kristijan Krajcek 90+3'; Hazzuwan Halim (yellow card) 31' (yellow-red card) 84'; Sahil Suhaimi (yellow card) 90+3'	Report	Naufal Azman 45+3' 87'; Vincent Bezecourt (yellow card) 58'; Amirul Adli (yellow card) 90+4'	Stadium: Jalan Besar Stadium; Referee: Mohd Taqi

28 May 2023 11	Tanjong Pagar United (Singapore)	1–3	(Singapore) Hougang United	Jurong East
	Khairul Hairie 90+1'; Shakir Hamzah (yellow card) 28'; Tajeli Salamat (yellow card) 55'; Fathullah Rahmat (yellow card) 90+4'	Report	Kristijan Krajcek 8'; Amy Recha 29' (pen.); Gabriel Quak 80'; Sahil Suhaimi (yellow card) 52'; Jordan Vestering (yellow card) 90+4'	Stadium: Jurong East Stadium; Referee: Ahmad A'qashah

3 June 2023 12	Hougang United (Singapore)	3–0	(Singapore) Young Lions FC	Jalan Besar
	Sahil Suhaimi 7'; Nazrul Nazari 12'; Gabriel Quak 45+2'; Ajay Robson (yellow card) 85'	Report	Ryu Hardy Yussri (yellow card) 52'; Syahadat Masnawi (yellow card) 70'	Stadium: Jalan Besar Stadium; Referee: Taufik Thana

7 June 2023 13	DPMM FC (Brunei)	2–3	(Singapore) Hougang United	Jalan Besar
	Hakeme Yazid Said 84' 90+4' (pen.); Syafiq Hilmi Shahrom (yellow card) 51'; Hendra Azam Idris (yellow card) 86'; Eddy Shahrol Omar (yellow card) 90+6'	Report	Amy Recha 33' 40' 53'; Zulfahmi Arifin (yellow card) 85'	Stadium: Jalan Besar Stadium (Note: Hassanal Bolkiah National Stadium unavailable due to ongoing renovations.); Referee: Farhad Mohamed

10 June 2023 14	Tampines Rovers (Singapore)	2–0	(Singapore) Hougang United	Tampines
	Boris Kopitović 68' (pen.); Shuya Yamashita 85'; Saifullah Akbar (yellow card) 45+2'	Report	Jordan Nicolas Vestering (yellow card) 45+1'; Ajay Robson (yellow card) 61'; Fairoz Hasan (red card) 90+1'	Stadium: Our Tampines Hub; Referee: Clarence Leow Hong Wei

25 June 2023 15	Lion City Sailors (Singapore)	3–0	(Singapore) Hougang United	Bishan
	Abdul Rasaq 45+3'; Adam Swandi 48' 75'	Report		Stadium: Bishan Stadium; Referee: Farhad Mohamed

2 July 2023 16	Hougang United (Singapore)	1–3	(Singapore) Balestier Khalsa	Jalan Besar
	Hazzuwan Halim 90+5'; Irwan Shah (yellow card) 36'; Amir Zailani (yellow card) 44'; Jordan Vestering (yellow card) 47'; Umar Ramle (yellow card) 64'; Dorde Maksimovic (yellow card) 71'	Report	Ryoya Tanigushi 49'; Madhu Mohana 54'; Masahiro Sugita 90'; Ho Wai Loon (yellow card) 40'	Stadium: Jalan Besar Stadium; Referee: Andrea Verolino

6 July 2023 17	Hougang United (Singapore)	0–1	(Singapore) Tampines Rovers	Jalan Besar
	Gabriel Quak (yellow card) 27'; Ajay Robson (yellow card) 36'	Report	Boris Kopitović 45+1'; Faris Ramli (yellow card) 74'	Stadium: Jalan Besar Stadium; Referee: Ahmad A'qashah

12 July 2023 18	Geylang International (Singapore)	0–2	(Singapore) Hougang United	Tampines
	Danish Irfan (yellow card) 41' (yellow-red card) 48'; Takahiro Tezuka (yellow card) 54'	Report	Kristijan Krajcek 45+4'; Gabriel Quak 87' (yellow card) 81'; Abdil Qaiyyim Mutalib (yellow card) 16'; Jordan Vestering (yellow card) 61'; Nazrul Nazari (yellow card) 84'	Stadium: Our Tampines Hub; Referee: Syarqawi Buhari; Man of the Match: Kristijan Krajcek

21 July 2023 19	Balestier Khalsa (Singapore)	1–3	(Singapore) Hougang United	Bishan
	Shuhei Hoshino 19'; Ho Wai Loon (yellow card) 90+1'	Report	Djordje Maksimovic 53'; Kristijan Krajcek 74' 86' (yellow card) 71'; Irwan Shah (yellow card) 43'; Abdil Qaiyyim Mutalib (yellow card) 90+2'	Stadium: Bishan Stadium; Referee: Taufik Thana

29 July 2023 20	Young Lions FC (Singapore)	2–6	(Singapore) Hougang United	Jalan Besar
	Harhys Stewart 47'; Zikos Vasileios Chua 90+2'; Fairuz Fazli Koh (yellow card) 44'; Jared Gallagher (yellow card) 65'	Report	Djordje Maksimovic 9' 67'; Kristijan Krajcek 41' 90+1'; Gabriel Quak 52'; Kazuma Takayama 64'; Naoki Kuriyama (yellow card) 15'	Stadium: Jalan Besar Stadium; Referee: Syarqawi Buhari

4 August 2023 21	Hougang United (Singapore)	1–0	(Brunei) DPMM FC	Jalan Besar
	Djordje Maksimovic 74'	Report	Farshad Noor (yellow card) 34'; Hanif Hamir (yellow card) 69'	Stadium: Jalan Besar Stadium; Referee: Andrea Verolino; Man of the Match: Zulfahmi Arifin

13 August 2023 22	Hougang United (Singapore)	2–8	(Singapore) Lion City Sailors	Jalan Besar
	Richairo Zivkovic 27' (o.g.); Gabriel Quak 68'; Sahil Suhaimi (yellow card) 56'	Report	Diego Lopes 11'; Abdul Rasaq 24'; Richairo Zivkovic 47' 73'; Christopher van Huizen 61'; Maxime Lestienne 78' 83'; Haiqal Pashia 90+1'; Nur Adam Abdullah (yellow card) 20'	Stadium: Jalan Besar Stadium; Referee: Hilmi Fuad; Man of the Match: Maxime Lestienne

19 August 2023 23	Hougang United (Singapore)	3–3	(Singapore) Tanjong Pagar United	Jalan Besar
	Kristijan Krajcek 29' (pen.); Amy Recha 32'; Nazrul Nazari 45+6'; Kazuma Takayama (yellow card) 33'; Jordan Vestering (yellow card) 82'	Report	Syukri Bashir 42'; Khairul Amri 69'; Faizal Roslan 90+2'	Stadium: Jalan Besar Stadium; Referee: Farhad Mohamed; Man of the Match: Shahrin Saberin

16 September 2023 24 (Rescheduled)	Albirex Niigata (S) (Japan)	0–5	(Singapore) Hougang United	Jurong East
	Seia Kunori 12', 19'; Junki Kenn Yoshimura 44'; Tadanari Lee 49', 69'; Shuto Komaki (yellow card) 54'	Report	Nazrul Nazari (yellow card) 68'	Stadium: Jurong East Stadium; Referee: Ahmad A'qashah

Pos	Team	Pld	W	D	L	GF	GA	GD	Pts	Qualification or relegation
1	Albirex Niigata (S) (Note: Three clubs – Albirex Niigata (S), DPMM FC and the FAS under-23 team Young Lions, are ineligible for any AFC competition spots.) (C)	24	20	2	2	86	20	+66	62	
2	Lion City Sailors (Q)	24	17	3	4	79	39	+40	54	Qualification for 2024-25 AFC Champions League Two Group Stage & ASEAN Club Championship
3	Tampines Rovers (Q)	24	14	6	4	47	32	+15	48	Qualification for 2024-25 AFC Champions League Two Group Stage
4	Balestier Khalsa	24	12	0	12	60	71	−11	36	
5	Geylang International	24	10	3	11	41	52	−11	33	
6	Hougang United	24	9	2	13	37	57	−20	29	
7	Brunei DPMM	24	6	5	13	39	43	−4	23	
8	Tanjong Pagar United	24	6	3	15	39	62	−23	21	
9	Young Lions	24	1	2	21	24	76	−52	5	

Source: Singapore Premier League
Rules for classification: 1) points; 2) goal difference; 3) number of goals scored; 4) number of wins
(C) Champions; (Q) Qualified for the phase indicated

=== Singapore Cup ===
Pos	Team	Pld	W	D	L	GF	GA	GD	Pts	Qualification
1	Lion City Sailors (Q)	3	2	1	0	12	2	+10	7	Semi-finals
2	Hougang United (Q)	3	1	1	1	5	5	0	4	Semi-finals
3	Balestier Khalsa	3	1	0	2	9	12	−3	3	
4	Tanjong Pagar United	3	1	0	2	5	12	−7	3	

Updated to match(es) played on 25 September 2023. Source: FAS
(Q) Qualified for the phase indicated

Win Draw Loss

25 September 2023 Group Match 1	Tanjong Pagar United (Singapore)	2–1	(Singapore) Hougang United	Jurong East
	Pedro Dias 24'; Kazuma Takayama 90+6' (o.g.); Tajeli Salamat (yellow card) 86'	Report	Kazuma Takayama 69' (yellow card) 86'; Amy Recha (yellow card) 26'	Stadium: Jurong East Stadium; Referee: Clarence Leow Hong Wei

21 October 2023 Group Match 2	Hougang United (Singapore)	3–2	(Singapore) Balestier Khalsa	Jalan Besar
	Louka Vaissierre Tan 3'; Djordje Maksimovic 13'; Amy Recha 87'; Abdil Qaiyyim Mutalib (yellow card) 38'; Hazzuwan Halim (yellow card) 90+9'	Report	Alen Kozar 41'; Shuhei Hoshino 57'	Stadium: Jalan Besar Stadium; Referee: Farhad Mohamed

25 November 2023 Group Match 3	Hougang United (Singapore)	1–1	(Singapore) Lion City Sailors	Jalan Besar
	Djordje Maksimovic 4'; Jordan Vestering (yellow card) 68'	Report	Shawal Anuar 84'; Hami Syahin (yellow card) 44'	Stadium: Jalan Besar Stadium; Referee: Syanqawi Buhari

3 December 2023 Semi Final Leg 1	Hougang United (Singapore)	1–0	(Brunei) DPMM FC	Jalan Besar
	Djordje Maksimovic 58'; Hazzuwan Halim (yellow card) 45+2'; Ajay Robson (yellow card) 69'; Louka Vaissierre Tan (yellow card) 84'; Kazuma Takayama (yellow card) 86'	Report	Farshad Noor (yellow card) 56'	Stadium: Jalan Besar Stadium; Referee: Jansen Foo

6 December 2023 Semi Final Leg 2	DPMM FC (Brunei)	0–2	(Singapore) Hougang United	Jalan Besar
	Azwan Saleh (yellow card) 40'; Kristijan Naumovski (yellow card) 51'; Najib Tarif (yellow card) 55'	Report	Djordje Maksimovic 41', 83'; Naoki Kuriyama (yellow card) 69'	Stadium: Jalan Besar Stadium; Referee: Ahmad A'qashah

Hougang won 3–0 on aggregate.

9 December 2023 Final	Hougang United (Singapore)	1–3	(Singapore) Lion City Sailors	Jalan Besar
	Kazuma Takayama 90+1'; Jordan Vestering (yellow card) 13'; Djordje Maksimovic (yellow card) 76'; Amy Recha (yellow card) 90+2'	Report	Richairo Zivkovic 27' (pen.); Maxime Lestienne 42'; Shawal Anuar 81'	Stadium: Jalan Besar Stadium; Referee: Andrea Verolino

=== AFC Cup ===
Win Draw Loss

==== Group stage ====
Pos	Team	Pld	W	D	L	GF	GA	GD	Pts	Qualification	SAB	HFC	PSM	HOU
1	(Malaysia) Sabah	6	4	0	2	19	9	+10	12	Zonal semi-finals	—	4–1	1–3	3–1
2	(Vietnam) Haiphong	6	3	1	2	13	9	+4	10 (Note: Ranked on head-to-head points: Haiphong 4, PSM Makassar 1.)		3–2	—	3–0	4–0
3	(Indonesia) PSM Makassar	6	3	1	2	10	12	−2	10		0–5	1–1	—	3–1
4	(Singapore) Hougang United	6	1	0	5	6	18	−12	3		1–4	2–1	1–3	—

Source: AFC
Rules for classification: Group stage tiebreakers
Notes:

21 September 2023 1	Sabah FC (Malaysia)	3–1	(Singapore) Hougang United	Kota Kinabalu, Malaysia
	Gabriel Peres 5'; Darren Lok 38', 62'	Report	Kazuma Takayama 61'	Stadium: Likas Stadium; Attendance: 7,607; Referee: Jonathan Barreiro (Australia)

5 October 2023 2	Hougang United (Singapore)	2–1	(Vietnam) Hai Phong FC	Jalan Besar, Singapore
	Djordje Maksimovic 82', 90+3'; Kazuma Takayama (yellow card) 54'; Amir Zalani (yellow card) 90+4'	Report	Yuri Mamute 55' (pen.)	Stadium: Jalan Besar Stadium; Attendance: 467; Referee: Hettikamkanamge Perera (Sri Lanka)

25 October 2023 3	PSM Makassar (Indonesia)	3–1	(Singapore) Hougang United	Gianyar, Indonesia
	Safrudin Tahar 22'; Yuran Fernandes 29'; Adilson Silva 55'	Report	Djordje Maksimovic 78' (pen.); Abdil Qaiyyim Mutalib (yellow card) 28'; Nazrul Nazari (yellow card) 53'; Kazuma Takayama (yellow card) 80'	Stadium: Kapten I Wayan Dipta Stadium; Attendance: 58; Referee: Ammar Ebrahim Mahfoodh (Bahrain)

9 November 2023 4	Hougang United (Singapore)	1–3	(Indonesia) PSM Makassar	Jalan Besar, Singapore
	Djordje Maksimovic 48'; Abdil Qaiyyim Mutalib (yellow card) 58'; Irwan Shah (yellow card) 68'; Amir Zalani (yellow card) 79'	Report	Abdil Qaiyyim Mutalib 54' (o.g.); Safrudin Tahar 71' (yellow card) 64'; Everton 90'; João Pedro (yellow card) 89'	Stadium: Jalan Besar Stadium; Attendance: 389; Referee: Pranjal Banerjee (India)

30 November 2023 5	Hougang United (Singapore)	1–4	(Malaysia) Sabah F.C.	Jalan Besar, Singapore
	Gabriel Quak 90+1'	Report	Naoki Kuriyama 16' (o.g.); Darren Lok 45' (pen.); Ramon 90'; Anders Aplin 77' (o.g.)	Stadium: Jalan Besar Stadium; Attendance: 624; Referee: Liu Kwok Man (Hong Kong)

14 December 2023 6	Hai Phong FC (Vietnam)	4–0	(Singapore) Hougang United	Haiphong, Vietnam
	Martin Lo 27'; Hồ Minh Dĩ 35'; Joseph Mpande 54'; Iryan Fandi 80' (o.g.); Lê Mạnh Dũng (yellow card) 81'	Report	Abdil Qaiyyim Mutalib (yellow card) 33'	Stadium: Lạch Tray Stadium; Referee: Alex King (Australia)
