= 2023 Tanjong Pagar United FC season =

Tanjong Pagar United FC
2023 season
- Chairman: Raymond Tang
- Coach: Hasrin Jailani
- Ground: Jurong East Stadium
- S.League: 8th
- Singapore Cup: Group Stage
- Top goalscorer: League: Marin Mudražija (9); All: Marin Mudražija (9)
Home colours	Away colours

The 2023 season was Tanjong Pagar United FC's 18th season at the top level of Singapore football. The club also competed in the Singapore Cup.

On 10 November, comedian Jarvis joined the club.

== Squad ==
=== Singapore Premier League ===
As of 10 Jan 2022

No.	Name	Nationality	Date of birth (age)	Last club	Contract since	Contract end
Goalkeepers
18	Fashah Iskandar	(Singapore)	15 February 1995 (age 31)	(Singapore) Warriors FC	2020	2023
23	Kenji Syed Rusydi	(Singapore)	12 July 1998 (age 28)	(Singapore) Young Lions FC	2020	2023
	Kimura Riki ^{U23}	(Singapore) (Japan)	14 November 2000 (age 25)	(Singapore) Balestier Khalsa	2023	2023
Defenders
3	Shahrin Saberin	(Singapore)	14 February 1995 (age 31)	(Singapore) Geylang International	2021	2023
5	Faizal Roslan	(Singapore)	30 May 1995 (age 31)	(Singapore) Geylang International	2023	2023
11	Shakir Hamzah ^{O30}	(Singapore)	20 October 1992 (age 33)	(Malaysia) Perak F.C.	2021	2023
16	Raihan Rahman ^{O30}	(Singapore)	7 February 1991 (age 35)	(Singapore) Balestier Khalsa	2020	2023
21	Syed Akmal ^{U23}	(Singapore)	28 April 2000 (age 26)	(Singapore) Young Lions FC	2023	2023
22	Akram Azman ^{U23}	(Singapore)	21 November 2000 (age 25)	(Singapore) Tampines Rovers	2022	2023
26	Pedro Dias	(Brazil)	23 September 1992 (age 34)	(Thailand) Samut Sakhon City (T3)	2023	2023
27	Tajeli Salamat	(Singapore)	7 February 1994 (age 32)	(Singapore) Geylang International	2023	2023
Midfielders
4	Azim Akbar ^{U23}	(Singapore) (Pakistan)	17 December 2001 (age 24)	Youth Team	2021	2023
7	Naqiuddin Eunos	(Singapore)	1 December 1997 (age 28)	(Singapore) Lion City Sailors	2023	2023
10	Khairul Hairie ^{U23}	(Singapore)	9 April 2000 (age 26)	(Singapore) Geylang International	2023	2023
15	Mirko Šugić	(Croatia)	25 April 1994 (age 32)	(Croatia) NK Dubrava (C2)	2022	2023
17	Zulfadhmi Suzliman	(Singapore)	10 February 1996 (age 30)	(Singapore) Geylang International	2023	2023
20	Blake Ricciuto	(Australia) (Uruguay) (Italy)	2 September 1992 (age 34)	(Spain) Vélez CF (S4)	2021	2023
Forwards
9	Syukri Bashir	(Singapore)	11 April 1998 (age 28)	(Singapore) Young Lions FC	2020	2023
14	Marin Mudražija	(Croatia)	30 June 1995 (age 31)	(Romania) SSU Poli (R2)	2023	2023
19	Khairul Amri ^{O30}	(Singapore)	14 March 1985 (age 41)	(Malaysia) FELDA United	2021	2023
Players left during season
2	Faritz Hameed (Captain) ^{O30}	(Singapore)	16 January 1990 (age 36)	(Singapore) Home United	2020	2023
Players on NS
22	Hadiputradila Saswadimata ^{U23}	(Singapore)	5 February 2000 (age 26)	(Singapore) Home United U19	2020	2022
6	Naufal Ilham ^{U23}	(Singapore)	16 August 2002 (age 24)	(Singapore) Lion City Sailors U21	2021	2023
8	Fathullah Rahmat ^{U23}	(Singapore)	5 September 2002 (age 24)	(Singapore) Tampines Rovers	2021	2023
62	Ikram Mikhail Mustaqim ^{U23}	(Singapore)	5 August 2005 (age 21)	Singapore Sports School	2022	2022

== Coaching staff ==
Position	Name	Ref.
Chairman	(Singapore) Raymond Tang	
General Manager	(Singapore) Desmund Khusnin	
Team Manager	(Singapore) Noh Alam Shah	
Head Coach	(Singapore) Hasrin Jailani	
Head Coach (Women)	(Singapore) Samawira Basri	
Goalkeeping Coach	(Singapore) Fajar Sarib	
Head of Youth	(Singapore) Jaslee Hatta	
Fitness Coach	(Singapore) Hafiz Osman	
Physiotherapist	(Singapore) Fadhli Hussein	
Sport Trainer	(Singapore) Mukhlis Sawit	
Kitman	(Singapore) Azwan Hishamuddin	

== Transfers ==
=== In ===
Preseason

Position	Player	Transferred From	Team	Ref
GK	(Singapore) (Japan) Kimura Riki	(Singapore) Balestier Khalsa	First Team	Free
GK	(Singapore) Travis Ang	(Singapore) Mattar City Sailors (SFL1)	U21	Free.
DF	(Brazil) Pedro Dias	(Thailand) Samut Sakhon City (T3)	First team	Free
DF	(Singapore) Naqiuddin Eunos	(Singapore) Lion City Sailors	First team	Free
DF	(Singapore) Tajeli Salamat	(Singapore) Lion City Sailors	First team	Free
DF	(Singapore) Faizal Roslan	(Singapore) Geylang International	First team	Free
DF	(Singapore) Nifail Noorhaizam	(Singapore) Lion City Sailors U17	U21	Free
DF	(Singapore) Farid Jafri	(Singapore) Mattar City Sailors (SFL1)	Mattar Sailors	Free
DF	(Singapore) Daniel Elfian	(Singapore) Mattar City Sailors (SFL1)	Mattar Sailors	Free
MF	(Singapore) Khairul Hairie	(Singapore) Geylang International	First team	Free
MF	(Singapore) Zulfadhmi Suzliman	(Singapore) Starlight Soccerites (IWL)	First team	Free
MF	(Singapore) (Indonesia) Febryan Pradana	(Singapore) Mattar City Sailors (SFL1)	U21	Free
MF	(Singapore) Aloysius Pang	(Singapore) Mattar City Sailors (SFL1)	U21	Free.
MF	(Singapore) Rian Haziq Rosley	(Singapore) Mattar City Sailors (SFL1)	U21	Free.
MF	(England) (Singapore) George Thomas	(Singapore) Lion City Sailors U21	U21	Free.
MF	(Australia) Charlie Traynor		U21	Free.
MF	(Singapore) Syahmi Indallah	(Singapore) Lion City Sailors U17	U21	Free
MF	(Singapore) Dhaniyah Qasimah	(Singapore) Hougang United (W)	Women	Free
FW	(Croatia) Marin Mudražija	(Romania) SSU Poli (R2)	First team	Free

Mid-season

Position	Player	Transferred From	Team	Ref
DF	(Singapore) Syed Akmal	(Singapore) Young Lions FC	First Team	Free

=== Loan In ===
Position	Player	Transferred From	Ref

=== Loan Return ===
Position	Player	Transferred To	Ref
GK	(Singapore) Kenji Syed Rusydi	(Singapore) SAFSA	End of NS

=== Out ===
Preseason

Position	Player	Transferred To	Team	Ref
GK	(Singapore) Zharfan Rohaizad	(Singapore) Lion City Sailors	First Team	Free
GK	(Singapore) Ameer Fiqr	Singapore Cricket Club (SFL1)	U21	Free
DF	(Singapore) Rusyaidi Salime	(Singapore) Lion City Sailors	First Team	Free
DF	(Singapore) Aqhari Abdullah	Retired	First Team	N.A.
DF	(Singapore) Daniel Bennett	Retired	First Team	N.A.
DF	(Singapore) Emmeric Ong	(Singapore) Balestier Khalsa	First Team	Free
DF	(Singapore) Adam Norkhalis	(Japan) Albirex Niigata U21	U21	Free
MF	(Singapore) Ryan Syaffiq	(Singapore)	First Team	Free
MF	(Singapore) Faizal Raffi	(Singapore) Tiong Bahru FC (SFL1)	First Team	Free
MF	(Japan) (Singapore) Shodai Nishikawa	(Cambodia) Angkor Tiger (C1)	First Team	Free
MF	(Singapore) Muthukumaran Navaretthinam	(Singapore) Geylang International U21	U21	Free
MF	(Singapore) Ouzkaan Poyraz	(Singapore) Geylang International U21	U21	Free
MF	(Singapore) Dylan Chia	(Singapore) Geylang International U21	U21	Free
MF	(Singapore) Dylan Choo	(Singapore) Hougang United U21	U21	Free
MF	(Singapore) (England) (Iran) Kian Ghadessy	(Singapore) Balestier Khalsa U21	U21	Free
FW	(Japan) Reo Nishiguchi	(South Korea) Gyeongju KHNP (K3)	First Team	Free
FW	(Singapore) Khairul Nizam	(Singapore) GDT Circuit FC (IFL)	First Team	Free
FW	(Singapore) Irsyad Azarudin	(Japan) Albirex Niigata U21	U21	Free
FW	(Singapore) Afiq Ramlee	(Singapore) Warwick Knights (SFL1)	U21	Free
FW	(Singapore) Nur Insyiarah Perwaz	(Singapore) Balestier Khalsa Women	Women	Free

Mid-season

Position	Player	Transferred To	Team	Ref
DF	(Singapore) Faritz Hameed	Retired	First Team	N.A.

=== Loan Out ===
Preseason

Position	Player	Transferred To	Ref
MF	(Singapore) Efly Danish	(Singapore) SAFSA	NS till 2023
FW	(Singapore) Hadiputradila Saswadimata	(Singapore) SAFSA	NS till Sept 2024
DF	(Singapore) Ikram Mikhail Mustaqim	(Singapore) Young Lions FC	NS till Jan 2025

Mid-season

Position	Player	Transferred To	Ref
MF	(Singapore) Fathullah Rahmat	(Singapore) SAFSA	NS till July 2025
MF	(Singapore) Naufal Ilham	(Singapore) SAFSA	NS till July 2025

=== Extension / Retained ===
Position	Player	Ref
GK	(Singapore) Fashah Iskandar	1-year contract from 2022 till 2023
DF	(Singapore) Shahrin Saberin	1-year contract from 2022 till 2023
DF	(Singapore) Azim Akbar	1-year contract from 2022 till 2023
DF	(Singapore) Akram Azman	1-year contract from 2022 till 2023
MF	(Singapore) Naufal Ilham	1-year contract from 2022 till 2023
MF	(Singapore) Fathullah Rahmat	1-year contract from 2022 till 2023
MF	(Singapore) Raihan Rahman	1-year contract from 2022 till 2023
FW	(Singapore) Khairul Amri	1-year contract from 2022 till 2023
FW	(Singapore) Syukri Bashir	1-year contract from 2022 till 2023
DF	(Singapore) Faritz Hameed	1-year contract from 2022 till 2023
MF	(Croatia) Mirko Šugić	1-year contract till 2023
MF	(Australia) Blake Ricciuto	1-year contract till 2023
DF	(Singapore) Shakir Hamzah	1-year contract till 2023

== Friendlies ==
=== Pre-season ===
Win Draw Loss

4 February 2023 1	Lion City Sailors (Singapore)	v	(Singapore) Tanjong Pagar United	Bishan
				Stadium: Bishan Stadium

18 February 2023 2	Tanjong Pagar United (Singapore)	v	(Singapore) Balestier Khalsa	Bishan
				Stadium: Bishan Stadium

=== Mid-season ===
Win Draw Loss

9 July 2023 1	Tanjong Pagar United (Singapore)	5–2	(Singapore) Sembawang Park Rangers (IWL)	Jurong East
				Stadium: Jurong East Stadium

== Team statistics ==
=== Appearances and goals (SPL) ===
As of 25 Nov 2023

Numbers in parentheses denote appearances as substitute.

No.	Pos.	Player	SPL		Singapore Cup		Total	
No.	Pos.	Player	Apps.	Goals	Apps.	Goals	Apps.	Goals
3	DF	(Singapore) Shahrin Saberin	10+1	1	3	0	14	1
4	MF	(Singapore) Azim Akbar	9+6	0	0+1	0	16	0
5	DF	(Singapore) Faizal Roslan	21+2	3	3	0	26	3
7	DF	(Singapore) Naqiuddin Eunos	22+1	1	3	2	26	3
9	FW	(Singapore) Syukri Bashir	14+8	6	1	0	23	6
10	MF	(Singapore) Khairul Hairie	6+7	1	0	0	13	1
11	DF	(Singapore) Shakir Hamzah	18+3	4	3	0	24	4
14	FW	(Croatia) Marin Mudražija	18+3	9	3	0	24	9
15	MF	(Croatia) Mirko Šugić	23	1	3	0	26	1
16	MF	(Singapore) Raihan Rahman	13+7	0	1	0	21	0
17	MF	(Singapore) Zulfadhmi Suzliman	4+13	0	0+2	0	19	0
18	GK	(Singapore) Fashah Iskandar	6+1	0	0+1	0	8	0
19	FW	(Singapore) Khairul Amri	5+15	3	0+2	0	23	3
20	MF	(Australia) Blake Ricciuto	19+2	4	2	0	23	4
21	DF	(Singapore) Syed Akmal	4	0	0+1	0	5	0
22	DF	(Singapore) Akram Azman	19+2	2	3	0	24	2
23	GK	(Singapore) Kenji Syed Rusydi	18	0	3	0	21	0
26	DF	(Brazil) Pedro Dias	7+1	1	3	2	11	3
27	DF	(Singapore) Tajeli Salamat	15+5	1	2	0	22	1
51	DF	(Singapore) (Indonesia) Febryan Pradana	3+2	0	0	0	5	0
53	MF	(Singapore) Saiful Azhar	1+1	0	0	0	2	0
54	DF	(Singapore) Farid Jafri	0+1	0	0	0	1	0
55	MF	(Singapore) Daniel Elfian	2+1	0	0	0	3	0
58	DF	(Singapore) Ahmad Dzulfaqar	0+1	0	0	0	1	0
63	FW	(Singapore) Zahir Rahman	0+1	0	0	0	1	0
65	MF	(England) George Thomas	1	0	0	0	1	0
68	MF	(Australia) Charlie Traynor	1	0	0	0	1	0
Players who have played this season but had left the club or on loan to other club
2	DF	(Singapore) Faritz Hameed	0	0	0	0	0	0
6	MF	(Singapore) Naufal Ilham	4+5	0	0	0	9	0
8	MF	(Singapore) Fathullah Rahmat	8+4	0	0	0	12	0

== Competitions ==
=== Overview ===
Competition	Record							
Competition	P	W	D	L	GF	GA	GD	Win %

=== Singapore Premier League ===
Win Draw Loss

25 February 2023 1	Lion City Sailors (Singapore)	3–1	(Singapore) Tanjong Pagar United	Bishan
	Hafiz Nor 11'; Kodai Tanaka 89' 90+3'	Report	Shahrin Saberin 90+2'; Mirko Šugić (penalty missed) 68	Stadium: Bishan Stadium; Attendance: 1,300; Referee: Ahmad A'qashah

3 March 2023 2	Tanjong Pagar United (Singapore)	0–2	(Singapore) Tampines Rovers	Jurong East
	Mirko Šugić (yellow card) 42'; Marin Mudrazija (yellow card) 61'; Naqiuddin Eunos (yellow card) 90+1'	Report	Faris Ramli 3'; Boris Kopitović 37'; Glenn Kweh (yellow card) 64'; Miloš Zlatković (yellow card) 78'; Saifullah Akbar (red card) 90+1'	Stadium: Jurong East Stadium; Referee: Farhad Mohamed

10 March 2023 3	Tanjong Pagar United (Singapore)	2–0	(Singapore) Geylang International	Jurong East
	Shakir Hamzah 19' (yellow card) 40'; Blake Ricciuto 48'; Tajeli Salamat (yellow card) 45+1'; Fathullah Rahmat (yellow card) 64'; Kenji Syed Rusydi (yellow card) 71'; Faizal Roslan (yellow card) 90+2'	Report		Stadium: Jurong East Stadium; Referee: Mohd Taqi

14 March 2023 4	DPMM FC (Brunei)	2–1	(Singapore) Tanjong Pagar United	Jalan Besar
	Andrey Varankow 55'; Hanif Hamir 78'	Report	Hirzi Zulfaqar Mahzan 28' (o.g.); Raihan Rahman (red card) 56'; Tajeli Salamat (yellow card) 85'; Shakir Hamzah (yellow card) 90+6'	Stadium: Jalan Besar Stadium (Note: DPMM stadium under renovation and not available); Referee: Ahmad A'qashah

1 April 2023 5	Tanjong Pagar United (Singapore)	2–1	(Singapore) Young Lions FC	Jurong East
	Syukri Bashir 39'; Shakir Hamzah 54'; Faizal Roslan (yellow card) 44'; Tajeli Salamat (red card) 48'; Marin Mudražija (yellow card) 74'	Report	Jacob Mahler (yellow card) 11' (yellow-red card) 23'; Amir Syafiz (yellow card) 61'; Harhys Stewart 78' (yellow card) 70'; Aizil Yazid (yellow card) 90'	Stadium: Jurong East Stadium; Attendance: 45; Referee: Hilmi Fuad

6 April 2023 6	Hougang United (Singapore)	1–2	(Singapore) Tanjong Pagar United	Jalan Besar
	Hazzuwan Halim 42'; Amy Recha (yellow card) 58'	Report	Marin Mudražija 65' (pen.); Khairul Amri 75'; Blake Ricciuto (yellow card) 68'; Kenji Syed Rusydi (yellow card) 90'	Stadium: Jalan Besar Stadium; Referee: Mohd Taqi

10 April 2023 7	Tanjong Pagar United (Singapore)	0–2	(Japan) Albirex Niigata (S)	Jurong East
	Raihan Rahman (yellow card) 35'; Marin Mudražija (yellow card) 90+4'	Report	Shodai Yokoyama 7'; Shuto Komaki 90'	Stadium: Jurong East Stadium; Referee: Jansen Foo

16 April 2023 8	Tanjong Pagar United (Singapore)	2–4	(Singapore) Balestier Khalsa	Jurong East
	Tajeli Salamat 10'; Shakir Hamzah 15'	Report	Ho Wai Loon 10'; Masahiro Sugita 17'; Ryoya Taniguchi 23' 60'	Stadium: Jurong East Stadium; Referee: Ahmad A'qashah

6 May 2023 9	DPMM FC (Brunei)	2–1	(Singapore) Tanjong Pagar United	Jalan Besar
	Voronkov (penalty missed) 34' 34'; Hakeme Yazid Said 84'; Hanif Farhan Azman (yellow card) 29'; Hirzi Zulfaqar Mahzan (yellow card) 69' (yellow-red card) 89'; Akmal Tursunbaev (yellow card) 90+7'	Report	Marin Mudražija 67'; Naufal Ilham (yellow card) 29'; Pedro Dias (red card) 31'	Stadium: Jalan Besar Stadium (Note: DPMM stadium under renovation and not available); Referee: Andrea Verolino

14 May 2023 10	Tampines Rovers (Singapore)	3–0	(Singapore) Tanjong Pagar United	Tampines
	Boris Kopitović 24' (yellow card) 57'; Kyoga Nakamura 79'; Kegan Phang 90+4'	Report	Shakir Hamzah (yellow card) 33' (yellow-red card) 88'; Faizal Roslan (yellow card) 50'; Azim Akbar (yellow card) 82'	Stadium: Our Tampines Hub; Referee: Hilmi Fuad

21 May 2023 11	Geylang International (Singapore)	2–3	(Singapore) Tanjong Pagar United	Tampines
	Vincent Bezecourt 45+4'; Delwinder Singh 72'; Joshua Pereira (yellow card) 18'	Report	Khairul Amri 10'; Mirko Šugić 45' (yellow card) 41'; Marin Mudražija 45+3' (yellow card) 80'; Akram Azman (yellow card) 38'; Shahrin Saberin (yellow card) 66'; Blake Ricciuto (yellow card) 69'; Zulfadhmi Suzliman (yellow card) 70'	Stadium: Our Tampines Hub; Referee: Syanqawi Buhari

28 May 2023 12	Tanjong Pagar United (Singapore)	1–3	(Singapore) Hougang United	Jurong East
	Khairul Hairie 90+1'; Shakir Hamzah (yellow card) 28'; Tajeli Salamat (yellow card) 55'; Fathullah Rahmat (yellow card) 90+4'	Report	Kristijan Krajcek 8'; Amy Recha 29' (pen.); Gabriel Quak 80'; Sahil Suhaimi (yellow card) 52'; Jordan Vestering (yellow card) 90+4'	Stadium: Jurong East Stadium; Referee: Ahmad A'qashah

6 June 2023 13	Young Lions FC (Singapore)	3–4	(Singapore) Tanjong Pagar United	Jalan Besar
	Jared Gallagher 27' (yellow card) 41'; Elijah Lim Teck Yong 29' 39'	Report	Blake Ricciuto 33'; Jun Kobayashi 55' (o.g.); Faizal Roslan 71'; Shakir Hamzah 89'; Fathullah Rahmat (yellow card) 15'; Marin Mudražija (yellow card) 76'	Stadium: Jalan Besar Stadium; Referee: Clarence Leow Hong Wei

11 June 2023 14	Balestier Khalsa (Singapore)	4–3	(Singapore) Tanjong Pagar United	Bishan
	Shuhei Hoshino 31' 54'; Ryoya Tanigushi 37' (pen.) 85'	Report	Marin Mudražija 63' (pen.) (yellow card) 45'; Blake Ricciuto 67'; Syukri Bashir 73'; Faizal Roslan (yellow card) 28' (yellow-red card) 81'; Tajeli Salamat (yellow card) 36'; Fathullah Rahmat (yellow card) 45+4'; Mirko Šugić (yellow card) 52'; Azim Akbar (yellow card) 90+2'	Stadium: Bishan Stadium; Referee: Farhad Mohamed

24 June 2023 15	Albirex Niigata (S) (Japan)	4–0	(Singapore) Tanjong Pagar United	Jurong East
	Koki Kawachi 10'; Shodai Yokoyama 45'; Seia Kunori 45+3' 88'; Nicky Melvin Singh (yellow card) 90+3'	Report	Shakir Hamzah (yellow card) 30'; Blake Ricciuto (yellow card) 62'; Khairul Hairie (yellow card) 90+2'	Stadium: Jurong East Stadium; Referee: Andrea Verolino

1 July 2023 16	Tanjong Pagar United (Singapore)	1–7	(Singapore) Lion City Sailors	Jurong East
	Faizal Roslan 30'; Khairul Hairie (yellow card) 31'; Shahrin Saberin (yellow card) 72'; Tajeli Salamat (yellow card) 90+4'	Report	Maxime Lestienne 10'; Abdul Rasaq 27'; Lionel Tan 63'; Diego Lopes 73' (pen.) 88'; Hami Syahin 78'; Shawal Anuar 90+10'; Zulqarnaen Suzliman (yellow card) 90+2'	Stadium: Jurong East Stadium; Attendance: 171; Referee: Clarence Leow Hong Wei

6 July 2023 17	Tanjong Pagar United (Singapore)	2–3	(Singapore) Balestier Khalsa	Jurong East
	Blake Ricciuto 45+1'; Marin Mudrazija 49' (pen.); Naqiuddin Eunos (yellow card) 40'; Raihan Rahman (yellow card) 72'; Akram Azman (yellow card) 74'	Report	Ryoya Tanigushi 27' (pen.); Madhu Mohana 69' (yellow card) 39'; Daniel Goh 75' (yellow card) 10' (yellow-red card) 78'; Jordan Emaviwe (yellow card) 60'	Stadium: Jurong East Stadium; Referee: Jansen Foo

11 July 2023 18	Tampines Rovers (Singapore)	2–1	(Singapore) Tanjong Pagar United	Tampines
	Boris Kopitović 73' (pen.) (yellow card) 90+5'; Faris Ramli 78'; Kyoga Nakamura (yellow card) 90+3'	Report	Syukri Bashir 73'; Blake Ricciuto (yellow card) 35'; Azim Akbar (yellow card) 48'; Kenji Syed Rusydi (yellow card) 70'	Stadium: Our Tampines Hub; Referee: Andrea Verolino

15 July 2023 19	Tanjong Pagar United (Singapore)	2–2	(Singapore) Geylang International	Jurong East
	Akram Azman 11'; Takahiro Tezuka 59'; Mirko Šugić (yellow card) 90+3'	Report	Yushi Yamaya 35'; Naqiuddin Eunos 89'; Rio Sakuma (yellow card) 45+2'; Akmal Azman (yellow card) 82'; Ahmad Syahir (yellow card) 89'; Syazwan Latiff (yellow card) 90+2'	Stadium: Jurong East Stadium; Referee: Farhad Mohamed

20 July 2023 20 (Rescheduled)	Lion City Sailors (Singapore)	3–2	(Singapore) Tanjong Pagar United	Bishan
	Maxime Lestienne 20' 81' (pen.); Shawal Anuar 86'; Hafiz Nor (yellow card) 33'; Haiqal Pashia (yellow card) 95+1'	Report	Syukri Bashir 35' (pen.); Akram Azman 64'; Raihan Rahman (yellow card) 78'; Tajeli Salamat (yellow card) 84'	Stadium: Bishan Stadium; Referee: Clarence Leow Hong Wei; Man of the Match: Fashah Iskandar

5 August 2023 21	Tanjong Pagar United (Singapore)	3–2	(Singapore) Young Lions FC	Jurong East
	Syukri Bashir (penalty missed) 6 42' (pen.); Marin Mudrazija 7'; Pedro Dias 69'	Report	Amiruldin Asraf (penalty missed) 31 84'; Syafi’ie Redzuan 51'	Stadium: Jurong East Stadium; Referee: Ahmad A'qashah

11 August 2023 22	Tanjong Pagar United (Singapore)	2–3	(Japan) Albirex Niigata (S)	Jurong East
	Marin Mudražija 68' 82'; Mirko Šugić (yellow card) 69'; Shahrin Saberin (yellow card) 90+4'	Report	Shuto Komaki 17'; Tadanari Lee 52'; Riku Fukashiro 76'; Ryo Takahashi (yellow card) 90+6'	Stadium: Jurong East Stadium; Referee: Syarqawi Buhari; Man of the Match: Shahrin Saberin

19 August 2023 23	Hougang United (Singapore)	3–3	(Singapore) Tanjong Pagar United	Jalan Besar
	Kristijan Krajcek 29' (pen.); Amy Recha 32'; Nazrul Nazari 45+6'; Kazuma Takayama (yellow card) 33'; Jordan Vestering (yellow card) 82'	Report	Syukri Bashir 42'; Khairul Amri 69'; Faizal Roslan 90+2'	Stadium: Jalan Besar Stadium; Referee: Farhad Mohamed; Man of the Match: Shahrin Saberin

15 September 2023 24 (Rescheduled)	Tanjong Pagar United (Singapore)	1–1	(Brunei) DPMM FC	Jurong East
	Marin Mudražija 55'; Kenji Syed Rusydi (red card) 11'; Pedro Dias (yellow card) 18'	Report	Hakeme Yazid Said 45'; Farshad Noor (yellow card) 78'	Stadium: Jurong East Stadium; Referee: Taufik Thana

Pos	Team	Pld	W	D	L	GF	GA	GD	Pts
5	Geylang International	24	10	3	11	41	52	−11	33
6	Hougang United	24	9	2	13	37	57	−20	29
7	Brunei DPMM (Note: Three clubs – Albirex Niigata (S), DPMM FC and the FAS under-23 team Young Lions, are ineligible for any AFC competition spots.)	24	6	5	13	39	43	−4	23
8	Tanjong Pagar United	24	6	3	15	39	62	−23	21
9	Young Lions	24	1	2	21	24	76	−52	5

Source: Singapore Premier League
Rules for classification: 1) points; 2) goal difference; 3) number of goals scored; 4) number of wins

=== Singapore Cup ===
Pos	Team	Pld	W	D	L	GF	GA	GD	Pts	Qualification
1	Lion City Sailors (Q)	3	2	1	0	12	2	+10	7	Semi-finals
2	Hougang United (Q)	3	1	1	1	5	5	0	4	Semi-finals
3	Balestier Khalsa	3	1	0	2	9	12	−3	3	
4	Tanjong Pagar United	3	1	0	2	5	12	−7	3	

Updated to match(es) played on 25 September 2023. Source: FAS
(Q) Qualified for the phase indicated

Win Draw Loss

25 September 2023 Group Match 1	Tanjong Pagar United (Singapore)	2–1	(Singapore) Hougang United	Jurong East
	Pedro Dias 24'; Kazuma Takayama 90+6' (o.g.); Tajeli Salamat (yellow card) 86'	Report	Kazuma Takayama 69' (yellow card) 86'; Amy Recha (yellow card) 26'	Stadium: Jurong East Stadium; Referee: Clarence Leow Hong Wei

21 October 2023 Group Match 2	Lion City Sailors (Singapore)	4–1	(Singapore) Tanjong Pagar United	Bishan
	Diego Lopes 13' (pen.); Shawal Anuar 68', 78', 90+3'; Hami Syahin (yellow card) 52'; Anumanthan Kumar (yellow card) 52'; Hariss Harun (yellow card) 72'; Richairo Zivkovic (yellow card) 90'	Report	Naqiuddin Eunos 27'; Shakir Hamzah (yellow card) 14'; Blake Ricciuto (yellow card) 44' (yellow-red card) 48'; Akram Azman (yellow card) 47'; Tajeli Salamat (red card) 90'	Stadium: Bishan Stadium; Referee: Hilmi Fuad

26 November 2023 Group Match 3	Balestier Khalsa (Singapore)	7–2	(Singapore) Tanjong Pagar United	Bishan
	Alen Kozar 13' (pen.); Shuhei Hoshino 49', 74', 89', 90+4'; Daniel Goh 90+1'; Ryoya Tanigushi 90+7'	Report	Pedro Dias 27'; Naqiuddin Eunos 45' (yellow card) 61'; Shakir Hamzah (red card) 76'	Stadium: Bishan Stadium; Referee: Andrea Verolino
