= Naoki Kuriyama =

Japanese footballer (born 1990)

Naoki Kuriyama 栗山 直樹
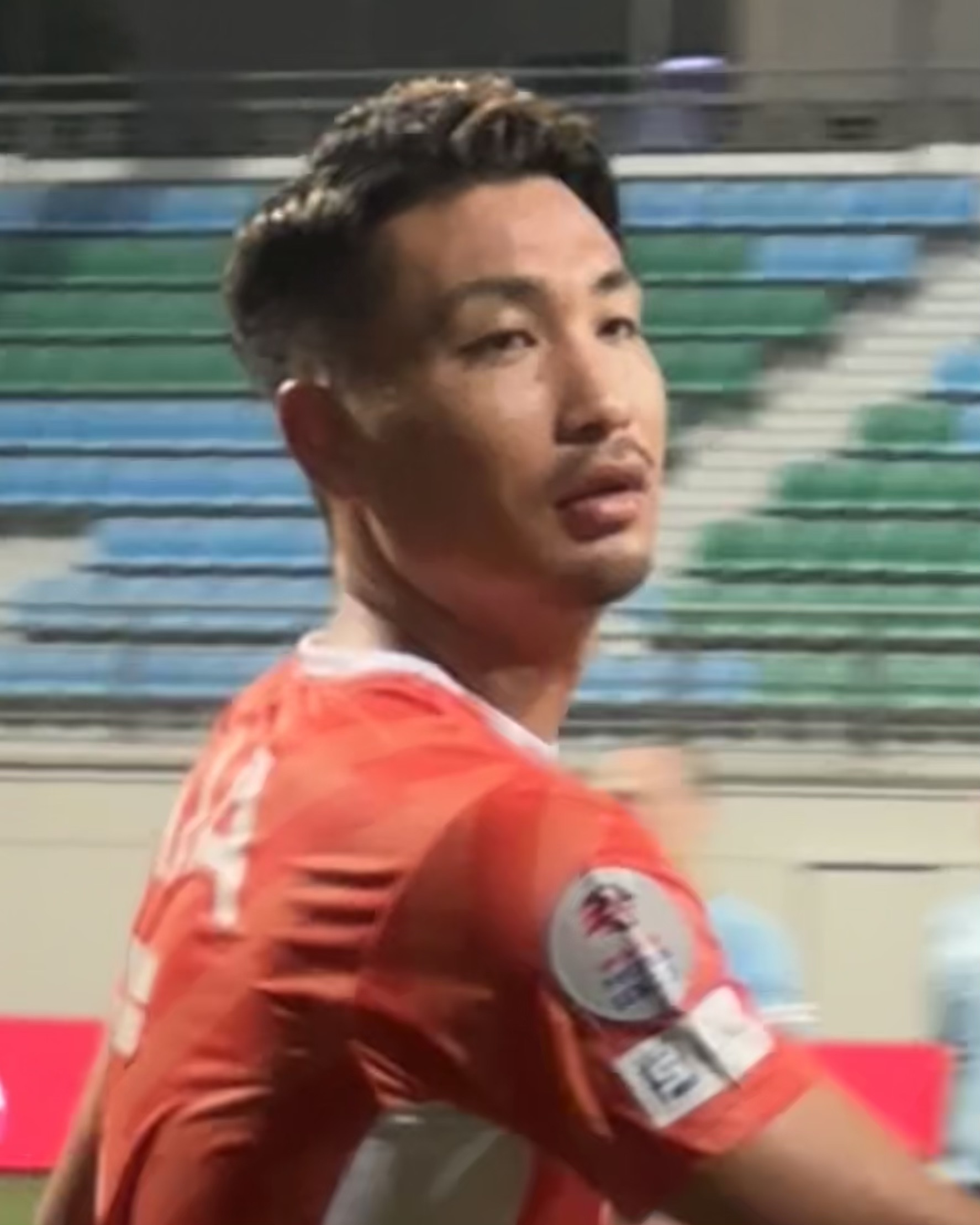
- Naoki Kuriyama with Hougang United in 2023

Personal information
- Full name: Naoki Kuriyama
- Date of birth: 8 December 1990 (age 35)
- Place of birth: Shizuoka, Shizuoka, Japan
- Height: 1.78 m (5 ft 10 in)
- Positions: Centre-back; left-back

Youth career
- 2006–2008: Shimizu Higashi High School
- 2009–2012: Senshu University

Senior career*
Years	Team	Apps	(Gls)
2013–2015	JEF United Chiba	7	(0)
2014	→ Machida Zelvia (loan)	0	(0)
2016–2021	Montedio Yamagata	114	(9)
2021	→ Ehime (loan)	18	(1)
2022	Ehime	24	(1)
2023	Hougang United	19	(0)
- * Club domestic league appearances and goals as of 5 January 2024, 19:32 (UTC)

Naoki Kuriyama (栗山 直樹, Kuriyama Naoki; born 8 December 1990), more commonly known as Kuriyama, is a Japanese retired footballer who played as a centre-back or left-back.

== Club career ==
=== JEF United Chiba ===
In 2012, he joined JEF United Chiba after completing his university.

=== Machida Zelvia ===
In 2014, he joined Machida Zelvia on loan.

=== Montedio Yamagata ===
In 2016, he joined J2 League side, Montedio Yamagata for more playing time.

=== Ehime ===
After 5 season with Montedio Yamagata making 114 league appearances with the club, Kuriyama moved to Ehime in 2021 initially on loan before making the move permanent in 2022. He was released at the end of the season.

=== Hougang United ===
On 25 January 2023, Kuriyama move overseas to play in the Singapore Premier League for Hougang United. He make a total of 32 appearance for the club before announcing his retirement on 18 January 2024.

== Club statistics ==
Updated to end of 2022 season.

Club performance			League		Cup		AFC Cup		Total	
Season	Club	League	Apps	Goals	Apps	Goals	Apps	Goals	Apps	Goals
Japan			League		Emperor's Cup		AFC Cup		Total	
2013	JEF United Chiba	J2 League	0	0	0	0	0	0	0	0
2014	JEF United Chiba	J2 League	0	0	0	0	0	0	0	0
2014	Machida Zelvia	J3 League	0	0	–		0	0	0	0
2015	JEF United Chiba	J2 League	7	0	3	0	0	0	10	0
2016	Montedio Yamagata	J2 League	16	1	2	0	0	0	18	1
2017	Montedio Yamagata	J2 League	10	2	2	0	0	0	12	2
2018	Montedio Yamagata	J2 League	36	3	3	0	0	0	39	3
2019	Montedio Yamagata	J2 League	40	2	0	0	0	0	40	2
2020	Montedio Yamagata	J2 League	8	0	0	0	0	0	8	0
2021	Montedio Yamagata	J2 League	4	1	1	0	0	0	5	1
2021	Ehime FC	J2 League	18	1	0	0	0	0	18	1
2022	Ehime FC	J3 League	24	1	0	0	0	0	24	1
Singapore			League		Singapore Cup		AFC Cup		Total	
2023	Hougang United	Singapore Premier League	19	0	7	0	6	0	32	0
Career total			163	11	11	0	0	0	206	11

== Honours ==
=== Hougang United ===
- Singapore Cup Runner-ups (1): 2023
