= 2023 Singapore Cup =

Tournament details
- Country: Singapore
- Dates: 24 September – 9 December 2023
- Teams: 9 clubs

Final positions
- Champions: Lion City Sailors
- Runners-up: Hougang United
- Third place: Tampines Rovers

Tournament statistics
- Matches played: 12 matches
- Top goal scorer: (Curaçao) Richairo Živković (6 goals)

The 2023 Singapore Cup will be the 24th edition of the Singapore Cup, Singapore's annual premier club football knock-out tournament organised by the Football Association of Singapore.

Hougang United is the defending champions, having won the tournament in 2022 after defeating defending champions Tampines Rovers 3–2 in the final to win their inaugural Singapore Cup.

== Format ==
=== Competition ===
The 2023 Singapore Cup began on September 24, 2023 with a group stage consisting of two groups. Group A had 5 teams, while Group B had 4 teams. Each team played each other team in their group once. The top 2 teams from each group advanced to the semifinals. In the semifinals, the first-place team from Group A played the second-place team from Group B, and the first-place team from Group B played the second-place team from Group A. The winners of the semifinals advanced to the final.

== Groups ==
The group-stage matches will run from September 24, 2023 to 26 November 2023, with the top two teams from each group proceeding to a two-legged semi-final stage.

=== Group A ===
Pos	Team	Pld	W	D	L	GF	GA	GD	Pts	Qualification
1	Brunei DPMM (Q)	4	3	1	0	7	2	+5	10	Semi-finals
2	Tampines Rovers (Q)	4	2	1	1	9	3	+6	7	Semi-finals
3	Albirex Niigata (S)	4	1	2	1	5	4	+1	5	
4	Geylang International	4	1	0	3	6	12	−6	3	
5	Young Lions	4	1	0	3	4	10	−6	3	

Updated to match(es) played on 29 September 2023. Source: FAS
(Q) Qualified for the phase indicated
24 September 2023

Brunei DPMM	1–1	Albirex Niigata (S)
Rahman 13'	Report	Kunori 57'

Jalan Besar Stadium, Jalan Besar
Referee: Muhammad Taqi
24 September 2023

Tampines Rovers	5–0	Young Lions
Yamashita 50'; Hanapi 64'; Kopitović 82'; Ramli 85', 90+1'	Report

Our Tampines Hub, Tampines
Referee: Farhad Mohamed

29 September 2023

Albirex Niigata (S)	1–2	Geylang International
Kishimoto 74'	Report	Yamaya 45+1'; Azman 51'

Jurong East Stadium, Jurong East
Referee: Syarqawi Buhari
29 September 2023

Brunei DPMM	1–0	Tampines Rovers
Noor 63' (pen.)	Report

Jalan Besar Stadium, Jalan Besar
Referee: Ahmad A'qashah

22 October 2023

Albirex Niigata (S)	2–0	Young Lions
Kunori 37'; Yokoyama 75'	Report

Jurong East Stadium, Jurong East
Referee: Ahmad A'qashah
22 October 2023

Geylang International	1–4	Brunei DPMM
Hussain 9' (pen.)	Report	Hakeme 23'; Noor 38'; Voronkov 43'; Farhan 68'

Our Tampines Hub, Tampines
Referee: Andrea Verolino

4 November 2023

Tampines Rovers	3–1	Geylang International
Saifullah Akbar 34'; Zlatković 49'; Joel 57'	Report	Tezuka 39'

Our Tampines Hub, Tampines
Referee: Jansen Foo
4 November 2023

Young Lions	0–1	Brunei DPMM
	Report	Noor 34'

Jalan Besar Stadium, Jalan Besar
Referee: Clarence Leow Hong Wei

26 November 2023

Albirex Niigata (S)	1–1	Tampines Rovers
Kawachi 68'	Report	Kopitović 79' (pen.)

Jurong East Stadium, Jurong East
Referee: Ahmad A'qashah
26 November 2023

Geylang International	2–4	Young Lions
Tezuka 39'; Yamaya 43'	Report	Kobayashi 56'; Kieran 59'; Gallagher 90+1'; Farhan 90+4'

Our Tampines Hub, Tampines
Referee: Taufik Thana

=== Group B ===
Pos	Team	Pld	W	D	L	GF	GA	GD	Pts	Qualification
1	Lion City Sailors (Q)	3	2	1	0	12	2	+10	7	Semi-finals
2	Hougang United (Q)	3	1	1	1	5	5	0	4	Semi-finals
3	Balestier Khalsa	3	1	0	2	9	12	−3	3	
4	Tanjong Pagar United	3	1	0	2	5	12	−7	3	

Updated to match(es) played on 25 September 2023. Source: FAS
(Q) Qualified for the phase indicated
25 September 2023

Balestier Khalsa	0–7	Lion City Sailors
	Report	Zivkovic 3', 11', 36'; Lopes 19', 25', 46'; Swandi 75'

Bishan Stadium, Bishan
Referee: Ahmad A"qashah
25 September 2023

Tanjong Pagar United	2–1	Hougang United
Dias 24'; Takayama 90+6' (o.g.)	Report	Takayama 69'

Jurong East Stadium, Jurong East
Referee: Clarence Leow Hong Wei

21 October 2023

Hougang United	3–2	Balestier Khalsa
Louka 3'; Maksimovic 13'; Recha 87'	Report	Kozar 41'; Hoshino 57'

Jalan Besar Stadium, Jalan Besar
Referee: Farhad Mohamed
21 October 2023

Lion City Sailors	4–1	Tanjong Pagar United
Lopes 13' (pen.); Anuar 68', 78', 90+3'	Report	Eunos 27'

Bishan Stadium, Bishan
Referee: Hilmi Fuad

25 November 2023

Balestier Khalsa	7–2	Tanjong Pagar United
Kozar 13' (pen.); Hoshino 49', 74', 89', 90+4'; Daniel 90+1'; Tanigushi 90+7'	Report	Dias 27'

Bishan Stadium, Bishan
Referee: Andrea Verolino
25 November 2023

Hougang United	1–1	Lion City Sailors
Maksimovic 4'	Report	Shawal 84'

Jalan Besar Stadium, Jalan Besar
Referee: Syanqawi Buhari

== Semi-finals ==
The semi final will take place on between 3 and 6 December 2023, with both the third-place playoff and final scheduled for 9 December 2023.

The first legs will be played on 3 December 2023, and the second legs will be played on 6 December 2023.

Team 1	Agg.	Team 2	1st leg	2nd leg
Brunei DPMM	0–3	Hougang United	0–1	0–2
Lion City Sailors	6–3	Tampines Rovers	3–3	3–0

3 December 2023
18:00

Hougang United	1–0	Brunei DPMM
Maksimovic 58'	Report

Jalan Besar Stadium, Jalan Besar
Referee: Jansen Foo
6 December 2023
19:45

Brunei DPMM	0–2	Hougang United
	Report	Djordje Maksimovic 41', 83'

Jalan Besar Stadium, Jalan Besar
Referee: Ahmad A'qashah

3 December 2023
18:00

Tampines Rovers	3–3	Lion City Sailors
Joel 3'; Faris 43'; Kopitović 81'	Report	Anumanthan 6'; Wright 13'; Shawal 52'

Our Tampines Hub, Tampines
Referee: Muhd Taqi
6 December 2023
19:45

Lion City Sailors	3–0	Tampines Rovers
Zivkovic 2', 59'; Lopes 66'	Report

Bishan Stadium, Bishan
Referee: Farhad Mohamed

== 3rd / 4th ==
9 December 2023
17:00

Brunei DPMM	0–2	Tampines Rovers
	Report	Kopitović 10'; Faris 31'

Jalan Besar Stadium, Jalan Besar
Referee: Clarence Leow Hong Wei

== Final ==
9 December 2023
20:00

Hougang United	1–3	Lion City Sailors
Takayama 90+1'	Report	Zivkovic 27' (pen.); Lestienne 42'; Shawal 84'

Jalan Besar Stadium, Jalan Besar
Referee: Andrea Verolino

== Season statistics ==
=== Top scorers ===
As of 9 Dec 2023

Rank	Player	Club	Goals
1	(Netherlands) (Curaçao) Richairo Zivkovic	Lion City Sailors	6
2	(Japan) Shuhei Hoshino	Balestier Khalsa	5
2	(Croatia) Djordje Maksimovic	Hougang United	5
2	(Singapore) Shawal Anuar	Lion City Sailors	5
2	(Brazil) Diego Lopes	Lion City Sailors	5
3	(Montenegro) Boris Kopitović	Tampines Rovers	4
3	(Singapore) Faris Ramli	Tampines Rovers	4
4	(Afghanistan) (Netherlands) Farshad Noor	Brunei DPMM	3
5	(Japan) Seia Kunori	Albirex Niigata (S)	2
5	(Slovenia) Alen Kozar	Balestier Khalsa	2
5	(Japan) Yushi Yamaya	Geylang International	2
5	(Japan) Takahiro Tezuka	Geylang International	2
5	(Japan) Kazuma Takayama	Hougang United	2
5	(Singapore) Joel Chew	Tampines Rovers	2
5	(Singapore) Naqiuddin Eunos	Tanjong Pagar United	2
5	(Brazil) Pedro Dias	Tanjong Pagar United	2
6	(Japan) Shunsaku Kishimoto	Albirex Niigata (S)	1
6	(Japan) Shodai Yokoyama	Albirex Niigata (S)	1
6	(Japan) Koki Kawachi	Albirex Niigata (S)	1
6	(Japan) Ryoya Tanigushi	Balestier Khalsa	1
6	(Singapore) Daniel Goh	Balestier Khalsa	1
6	(Belarus) Andrey Varankow	Brunei DPMM	1
6	(Brunei) Azwan Ali Rahman	Brunei DPMM	1
6	(Brunei) Hanif Farhan Azman	Brunei DPMM	1
6	(Brunei) Hakeme Yazid Said	Brunei DPMM	1
6	(Singapore) Naufal Azman	Geylang International	1
6	(Singapore) Iqbal Hussain	Geylang International	1
6	(Singapore) Louka Vaissierre Tan	Hougang United	1
6	(Singapore) Amy Recha	Hougang United	1
6	(Belgium) Maxime Lestienne	Lion City Sailors	1
6	(Singapore) Anumanthan Kumar	Lion City Sailors	1
6	(Singapore) Adam Swandi	Lion City Sailors	1
6	(Australia) Bailey Wright	Lion City Sailors	1
6	(Singapore) Saifullah Akbar	Tampines Rovers	1
6	(Singapore) Yasir Hanapi	Tampines Rovers	1
6	(Serbia) Miloš Zlatković	Tampines Rovers	1
6	(Japan) Shuya Yamashita	Tampines Rovers	1
6	(Japan) Kan Kobayashi	Young Lions FC	1
6	(Singapore) Kieran Teo Jia Jun	Young Lions FC	1
6	(Singapore) (Republic of Ireland) Jared Gallagher	Young Lions FC	1
6	(Singapore) Farhan Zulkifli	Young Lions FC	1

=== Top assists ===
As of 9 Dec 2023

Rank	Player	Club	Assists
1	(Belgium) Maxime Lestienne	Lion City Sailors	6
2	(Japan) Masahiro Sugita	Balestier Khalsa	3
2	(Singapore) Nazrul Nazari	Hougang United	3
2	(Brazil) Diego Lopes	Lion City Sailors	3
3	(Japan) Ryoya Tanigushi	Balestier Khalsa	2
3	(Belarus) Andrey Varankow	Brunei DPMM	2
3	(Brunei) Hakeme Yazid Said	Brunei DPMM	2
3	(Singapore) Irwan Shah	Hougang United	2
3	(Singapore) Shawal Anuar	Lion City Sailors	2
3	(Montenegro) Boris Kopitović	Tampines Rovers	2
3	(Singapore) Joel Chew	Tampines Rovers	2
3	(Singapore) Faris Ramli	Tampines Rovers	2
3	(Singapore) Raihan Rahman	Tanjong Pagar United	2
4	(Japan) Shuto Komaki	Albirex Niigata (S)	1
4	(Japan) Tadanari Lee	Albirex Niigata (S)	1
4	(Japan) Kaisei Ogawa	Albirex Niigata (S)	1
4	(Singapore) (Japan) Junki Kenn Yoshimura	Albirex Niigata (S)	1
4	(Singapore) Madhu Mohana	Balestier Khalsa	1
4	(Afghanistan) (Netherlands) Farshad Noor	Brunei DPMM	1
4	(Brunei) Azwan Ali Rahman	Brunei DPMM	1
4	(Singapore) Iqbal Hussain	Geylang International	1
4	(Singapore) Shahfiq Ghani	Geylang International	1
4	(Japan) Yushi Yamaya	Geylang International	1
4	(Singapore) Arshad Shamim	Geylang International	1
4	(Singapore) Gabriel Quak	Hougang United	1
4	(Singapore) Amy Recha	Hougang United	1
4	(Singapore) Abdil Qaiyyim Mutalib	Hougang United	1
4	(Netherlands) (Curaçao) Richairo Zivkovic	Lion City Sailors	1
4	(Singapore) Adam Swandi	Lion City Sailors	1
4	(Singapore) Hami Syahin	Lion City Sailors	1
4	(Singapore) Shah Shahiran	Tampines Rovers	1
4	(Singapore) Saifullah Akbar	Tampines Rovers	1
4	(Singapore) Yasir Hanapi	Tampines Rovers	1
4	(Japan) Kyoga Nakamura	Tampines Rovers	1
4	(Singapore) Amir Syafiq	Young Lions FC	1
4	(Singapore) Ikram Mikhail Mustaqim	Young Lions FC	1

=== Clean sheets ===
As of 9 Dec 2023

Rank	Player	Club	Clean sheets
1	(North Macedonia) Kristijan Naumovski	Brunei DPMM	2
1	(Singapore) Zaiful Nizam	Hougang United	2
1	(Singapore) Izwan Mahbud	Lion City Sailors	2
1	(Singapore) Syazwan Buhari	Tampines Rovers	2
2	(Singapore) Hassan Sunny	Abirex Niigata (S)	1

=== Hat tricks ===
As of 21 Oct 2023

Player	For	Against	Date
(Netherlands) (Curaçao) Richairo Zivkovic	Lion City Sailors	Balestier Khalsa	25 Sept 23
(Brazil) Diego Lopes	Lion City Sailors	Balestier Khalsa	25 Sept 23
(Singapore) Shawal Anuar	Lion City Sailors	Tanjong Pagar United	21 Oct 23
(Japan) Shuhei Hoshino ^{4}	Balestier Khalsa	Tanjong Pagar United	25 Nov 23

Note ^{4} Player scored 4 goals

=== Penalty missed ===
As of 26 Sept 2023

Player	For	Against	Date
(Montenegro) Boris Kopitović	Tampines Rovers	Young Lions FC	24 Sept 23
(Singapore) Farhan Zulkifli	Young Lions FC	Brunei DPMM	4 Nov 23

=== Own goals ===
As of 26 Sept 2023

Player	For	Against	Date
(Japan) Kazuma Takayama	Hougang United	Tanjong Pagar United	25 Sept 2023
