= Kazuma Takayama =

Japanese footballer

Kazuma Takayama 高山和真
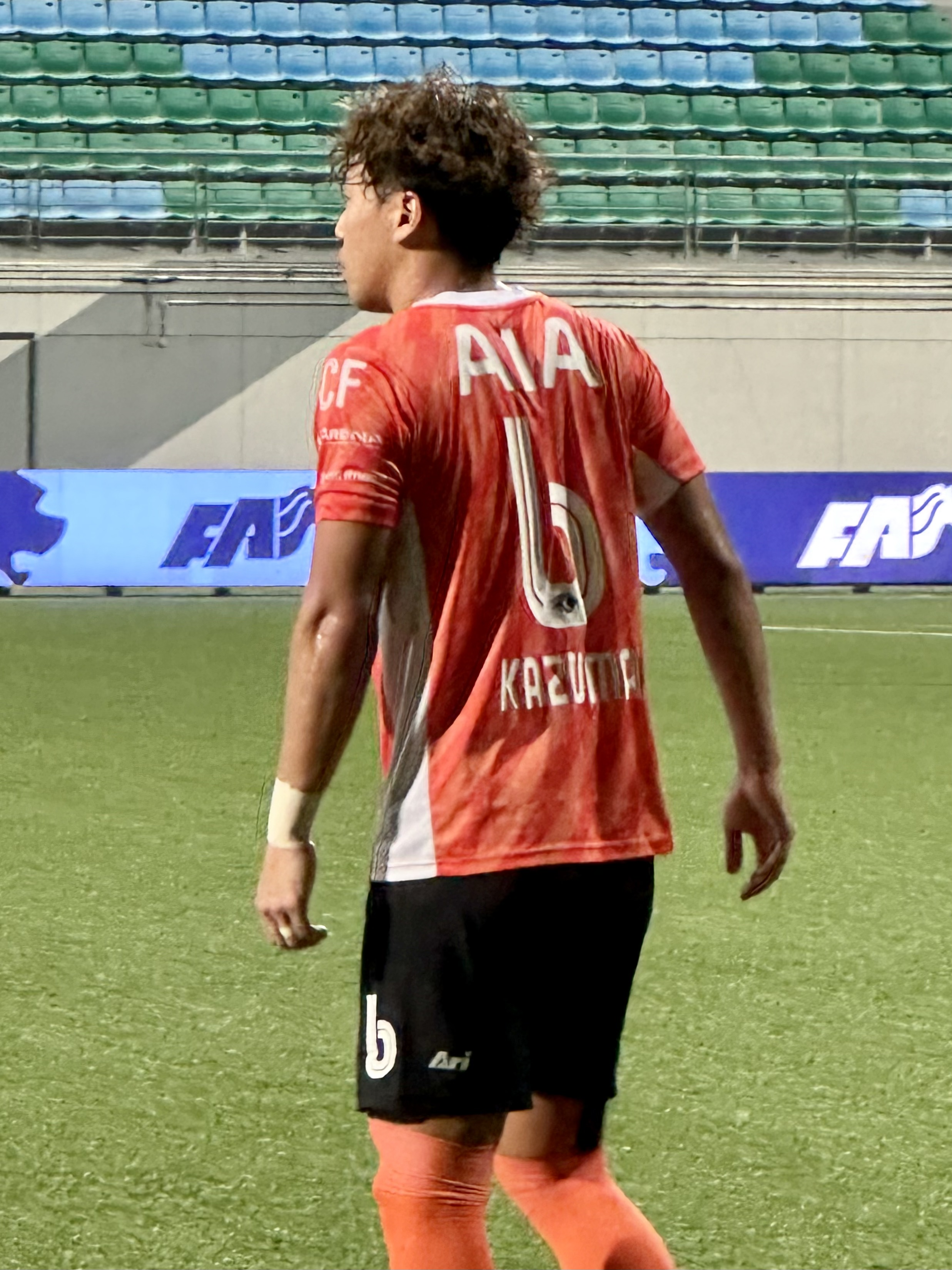
- Kazuma in a match against Brunei DPMM

Personal information
- Full name: Kazuma Takayama
- Date of birth: July 14, 1996 (age 30)
- Place of birth: Saitama, Japan
- Height: 1.80 m (5 ft 11 in)
- Positions: Centre-back; left-back

Youth career
- Kawagoe Panthe
- 2009–2014: Omiya Ardija

Senior career*
| Years | Team | Apps | (Gls) |
| 2015–2021 | Omiya Ardija | 25 | (0) |
| 2015 | → J. League U-22 (loan) | 14 | (0) |
| 2020 | → Montedio Yamagata (loan) | 0 | (0) |
| 2022 | Kataller Toyama | 3 | (0) |
| 2023 | Hougang United | 23 | (2) |
- * Club domestic league appearances and goals as of 15:10, 26 November 2023 (UTC)

Kazuma Takayama (高山 和真, Takayama Kazuma; born July 14, 1996 in Saitama), better known as Kazuma, is a Japanese former footballer who last played either as a centre-back or left-back.

== Career ==
=== Omiya Ardija ===
In 2015, Kazuma joined J2 League side, Omiya Ardija after completing his university.

=== Montedio Yamagata ===
In 2020, Kazuma transferred to Montedio Yamagata on loan.

=== Kataller Toyama ===
On December 30, 2021, Kazuma completed his transfer to Kataller Toyama playing in J3 League.

=== Hougang United ===
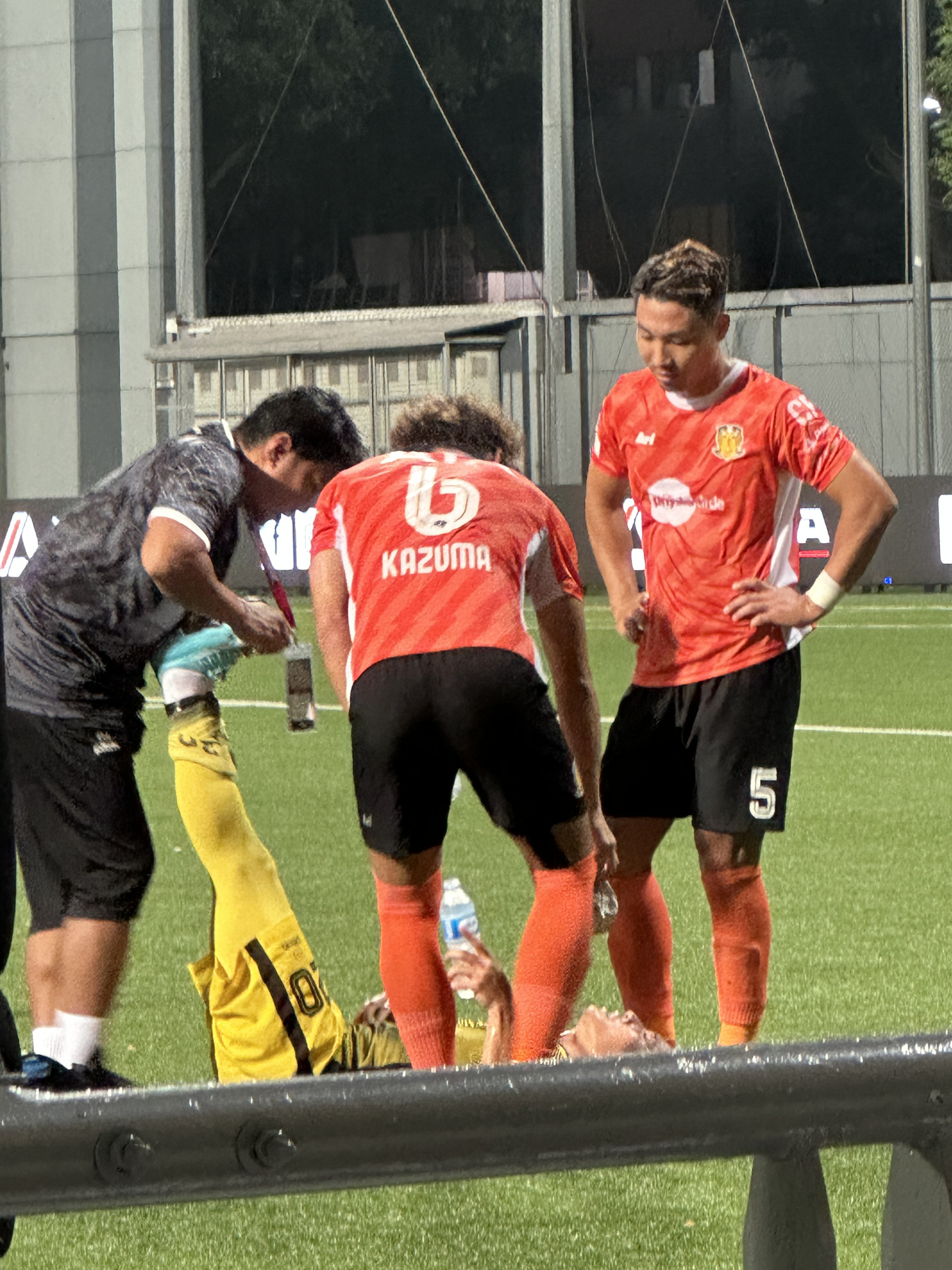
Kazuma Takayama (left) with fellow countrymen, Naoki Kuriyama helping an injured Brunei DPMM player.

Kazuma moved overseas to join Hougang United in Singapore for the upcoming 2023 Singapore Premier League season. He made his debut for the club in a 3-0 lost against Albirex Niigata (S) in the 2023 Singapore Community Shield. On 26 February 2023, Kazuma scored his first goal for the club in his league debut against Balestier Khalsa in 3-2 win. He would go on to score his second goal on 29 July 2023 against Young Lions in a thrashing 6-2 win. He would than go on to score a consolation header goal against the Lion City Sailors in the Singapore Cup 2023 final where they lost 3-1.

== Club statistics ==
Updated to 23 February 2020.

| Club performance | | | League | | Cup | | League Cup | | AFC Cup | | Total | |
| Season | Club | League | Apps | Goals | Apps | Goals | Apps | Goals | Apps | Goals | Apps | Goals |
| Japan | | | League | | Emperor's Cup | | J. League Cup | | AFC | | Total | |
|---|---|---|---|---|---|---|---|---|---|---|---|---|
| 2015 | Omiya Ardija | J2 League | 0 | 0 | 1 | 0 | 0 | 0 | 0 | 0 | 1 | 0 |
| 2016 | Omiya Ardija | J1 League | 1 | 0 | 2 | 0 | 4 | 0 | 0 | 0 | 7 | 0 |
| 2017 | Omiya Ardija | J1 League | 11 | 0 | 2 | 0 | 6 | 1 | 0 | 0 | 19 | 1 |
| 2018 | Omiya Ardija | J2 League | 0 | 0 | 2 | 0 | – | | 0 | 0 | 2 | 0 |
| 2019 | Omiya Ardija | J2 League | 2 | 0 | 1 | 1 | – | | 0 | 0 | 3 | 1 |
| 2020 | Montedio Yamagata | J2 League | 0 | 0 | 0 | 0 | – | | 0 | 0 | 0 | 0 |
| 2020 | Omiya Ardija | J2 League | 11 | 0 | 0 | 0 | – | | 0 | 0 | 11 | 0 |
| 2021 | Omiya Ardija | J2 League | 0 | 0 | 0 | 0 | 0 | 0 | 0 | 0 | 0 | 0 |
| 2022 | Kataller Toyama | J3 League | 3 | 0 | 0 | 0 | – | | 0 | 0 | 3 | 0 |
| Singapore | | | League | | Singapore Cup | | Others | | AFC Cup | | Total | |
| 2023 | Hougang United | Singapore Premier League | 0 | 0 | 0 | 0 | 0 | 0 | 0 | 0 | 0 | 0 |
| Total | | | 14 | 0 | 8 | 1 | 10 | 1 | 0 | 0 | 32 | 2 |

== Honours ==
=== Hougang United ===
- Singapore Cup Runner-ups (1): 2023
