= Abdil Qaiyyim Mutalib =

Singaporean footballer

Personal information
- Full name: Abdil Qaiyyim bin Abdul Mutalib
- Date of birth: 14 May 1989 (age 37)
- Place of birth: Singapore
- Height: 1.83 m (6 ft 0 in)
- Positions: Centre-back; left-back

Team information
- Current team: Young Lions

Youth career
- 2004–2007: Warriors FC

Senior career*
Years	Team	Apps	(Gls)
2007–2010	Young Lions	11	(0)
2011	Home United	11	(0)
2012	LionsXII	2	(0)
2013	Warriors FC	25	(0)
2014	Tampines Rovers	15	(1)
2015–2019	Home United	129	(6)
2020–2021	Lion City Sailors	9	(0)
2021–2022	Geylang International	24	(1)
2023–2024	Hougang United	3	(0)
2025–2026	Balestier Khalsa	10	(0)
2026–	Young Lions	10	(0)

International career
2016–	Singapore	1	(0)
- * Club domestic league appearances and goals as of 18 July 2021

Abdil Qaiyyim bin Abdul Mutalib (born 14 May 1989) is a Singaporean professional footballer who plays either as a centre-back or left-back for Singapore Premier League club Young Lions.

== Youth career ==
Abdil signed for local S.League side Warriors FC's youth team at the age of 15 in 2004, until he left to join the Young Lions in 2007.

== Club career ==
=== Young Lions ===
In 2007, Abdil moved from Warriors FC to join S.League club, Young Lions on a professional contract. He had to wait until 3 August 2009, when he made his debut appearance for the club in a league fixture against the Super Reds. The match ended in a 1–1 draw.

=== Home United ===
Abdil joined S.League side Home United for the 2011 S.League season, making a total of 14 competitive appearances in his stint at the club.

=== LionsXII ===
On 14 April 2012, Robin Chitrakar, coach of the Young Lions at that time, confirmed the departure of Abdil from the club to join the LionsXII in the 2012 Malaysia Super League. Abdil however, only managed to make a total of 5 competitive appearances for the team in the entirety of his stint.

=== Warriors FC ===
Following the underwhelming stint with the LionsXII in the Malaysia Super League, Abdil returned from abroad to rejoin his boyhood club Warriors FC for the 2013 S.League season. Abdil cited his wish to challenge for honors and silverware as his reason for returning to the youth club where he began his footballing career. Abdil made his professional debut on 21 February 2013 in the first match of the season against Woodlands Wellington, with the fixture ending in a 2–2 draw.

On 19 February 2014, Abdil's contract with the Warriors FC was officially terminated, with a misunderstanding between the player and the club's general manager Chong Wei Chiang over a right knee injury, and the player's performance in the league's mandatory fitness test cited as primary reasons for the termination.

=== Tampines Rovers ===
Following Abdil's contract termination by Warriors FC, he agreed professional terms and signed a one-year contract with Tampines Rovers, the defending champions of the 2013 S.League season. On 21 February 2014, Abdil made his debut for the Stags in the 2014 Singapore Community Shield fixture.

=== Home United ===
Abdil rejoined Home United for the 2015 S.League season, making his second debut for the Protectors on 3 March 2015, in a match against Geylang International. The match ended in a 1–1 draw. Abdil earned plaudits with his performances for the club, and was awarded consecutive Man of the Match accolades for his appearances in a Singapore Cup fixture against his boyhood club Warriors FC, as well as a S.League fixture against Japanese satellite club Albirex Niigata (S). Abdil was retained by the club following the conclusion of the season to continue playing with the Protectors in the 2016 S.League season.

=== Geylang International ===
On 2 June 2021, Abdil signed for Geylang International on a permanent transfer from Lion City Sailors for the remainder of the 2021 Singapore Premier League season. In the following season, he extended his contract for the following year.

=== Hougang United ===
On 3 July 2023, Abdil signed for Hougang United for the remainder of the 2023 Singapore Premier League season and for the 2023–24 AFC Cup group stage campaign.

Balestier Khalsa

On 3 January 2025, it was announced that Abdil had signed for Balestier Khalsa for the remainder of the 2024/25 campaign to help strengthen the Tiger’s backline.

== Career statistics ==
19 March 2022

Club	Season	S.League		Singapore Cup		Singapore League Cup		Asia		Total	
Club	Season	Apps	Goals	Apps	Goals	Apps	Goals	Apps	Goals	Apps	Goals
Young Lions	2007	0	0	0	0	0	0	—		0	0
Young Lions	2008	0	0	0	0	0	0	—		0	0
Young Lions	2009	2	0	0	0	0	0	—		2	0
Young Lions	2010	9	0	0	0	1	0	—		10	0
Young Lions	Total	11	0	0	0	1	0	—		12	0
Home United	2011	11	0	2	0	1	0	—		14	0
Home United	Total	11	0	2	0	1	0	—		14	0
Club	Season	Malaysia Super League		Malaysia FA Cup		Malaysia Cup		Asia		Total	
LionsXII	2012	2	0	0	0	3	0	—		5	0
LionsXII	Total	2	0	0	0	3	0	—		5	0
Club	Season	S.League		Singapore Cup		Singapore League Cup		Asia		Total	
Warriors FC	2013	25	0	1	0	2	0	6	0	34	0
Warriors FC	Total	25	0	1	0	2	0	6	0	34	0
Tampines Rovers	2014	15	1	1	0	3	0	—		19	1
Tampines Rovers	Total	15	1	1	0	3	0	—		19	1
Home United	2015	25	1	5	1	1	0	—		11	0
Home United	2016	11	0	0	0	0	0	—		31	2
Home United	2017	16	1	3	0	1	0	7	0	27	1
Home United	2018	15	0	4	0	0	0	9	0	28	0
Home United	2019	22	1	3	0	0	0	7	2	32	3
Home United	Total	89	3	15	1	2	0	23	2	129	6
Lion City Sailors	2020	9	0	0	0	0	0	0	0	9	0
Lion City Sailors	2021	0	0	0	0	0	0	0	0	0	0
Lion City Sailors	Total	9	0	0	0	0	0	0	0	9	0
Geylang International	2021	7	0	0	0	0	0	0	0	7	0
Geylang International	2022	2	0	0	0	0	0	0	0	2	0
Geylang International	Total	9	0	0	0	0	0	0	0	9	0
Hougang United	2023	2	0	4	0	0	0	4	0	10	0
Hougang United	Total	2	0	4	0	0	0	4	0	10	0
Career total		173	4	23	1	12	0	33	2	241	7

== Honours ==
=== Club ===
- AFC West Zone
  - Champions 2018
- Singapore League
  - Runner Up 2018
- Singapore Cup
  - Winner: 2011
  - Runner-up: 2015
- Singapore Community Shield
  - Winner: 2014
