= Diego Lopes (footballer) =

Brazilian footballer (born 1994)

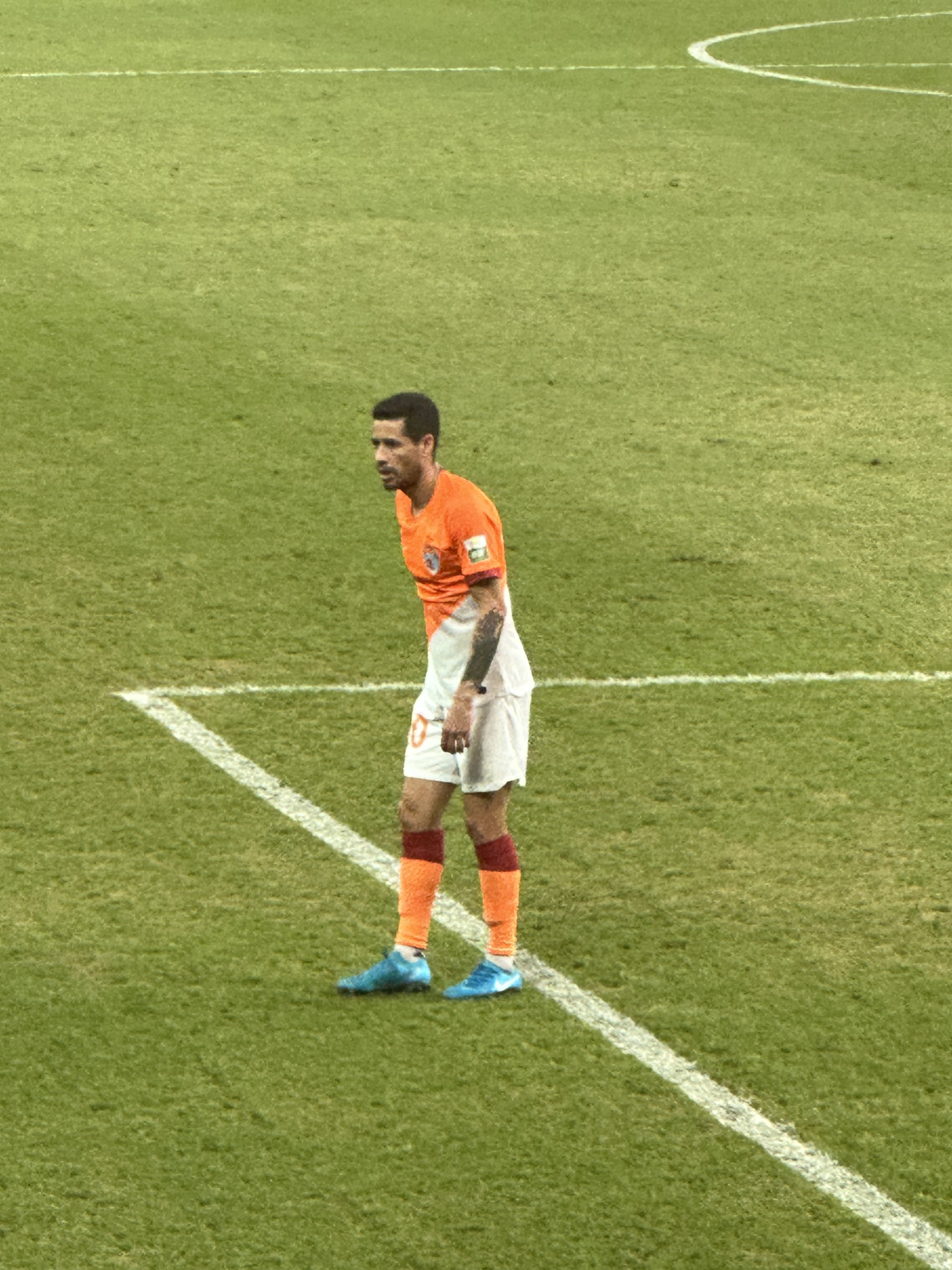
- Lopes in 2024

Personal information
- Full name: Diego Hipólito da Silva Lopes
- Date of birth: 3 May 1994 (age 32)
- Place of birth: São Paulo, Brazil
- Height: 1.71 m (5 ft 7 in)
- Position: Attacking midfielder

Youth career
- 2008: Palmeiras
- 2008–2012: Benfica

Senior career*
Years	Team	Apps	(Gls)
2012–2013	Benfica	0	(0)
2012–2013	→ Rio Ave (loan)	21	(0)
2013–2015	Rio Ave	59	(5)
2015–2018	Benfica	0	(0)
2015–2016	→ Kayserispor (loan)	22	(0)
2016	→ América Mineiro (loan)	5	(0)
2017–2018	→ Panetolikos (loan)	22	(1)
2018–2021	Rio Ave	72	(11)
2021–2023	Lion City Sailors	67	(24)
2024	Qingdao Hainiu	24	(3)
- * Club domestic league appearances and goals as of 16:12, 17 December 2023 (UTC)

Diego Hipólito da Silva Lopes (born 3 May 1994), known as Diego Lopes, is a Brazilian professional footballer who plays as an attacking midfielder.

Lopes is the most expensive and the first multimillion-dollar player signing in the Singapore Premier League history.

== Career ==
=== Benfica ===
Born in São Paulo, Lopes arrived in Portugal in December 2008, after a short spell at Palmeiras and joined Benfica. Rated by football legend, Rui Costa, as a top prospect, Lopes helped the Lisbon-side, win their first Under-15 Championship since the 1988–89 season.

=== Rio Ave ===
On 10 June 2012, Lopes joined Rio Ave in Primeira Liga, and made his debut on 2 September 2012 in a draw against Académica. His first goal arriving twenty-four days later in a 2012–13 Taça da Liga match against Freamunde. A year later, on 3 August 2013, Lopes signed a permanent deal with Rio Ave for five seasons. After good performances in his third year in Vila do Conde, which included a career best, nine goals, he was touted for a return to Benfica.

=== Return to Benfica and loan moves ===
The move was confirmed days later, when he rejoined Benfica on a five-year deal. However, he was not included in the first-team and was subsequently loaned to Turkish team Kayserispor alongside teammate, Derley. Lopes scored his only goal for them in a 2015–16 Turkish Cup match against İnegölspor on 26 January 2016, scoring the second goal in a 2–0 win. After the season concluded, Lopes did not stay with the Turkish team and he is loaned for six-months to Brazilian club, América Mineiro in July 2016. After three months, América Mineiro terminated the loan deal ahead of time and returned him to Benfica.

In January 2017, Lopes was loaned for a third time, joining Panetolikos in the Super League Greece for a period of 18 months. Panetolikos and Lopes parted ways on 13 January 2018.

=== Return to Rio Ave ===
Three days later on 16 January 2018, after he parted ways with the Greece club, Lopes transfer to his former club, Rio Ave on a five-year contract. Lopes appeared 201 times for Rio Ave scoring 25 goals and contributing 26 assists in his 9-year journey with the club.

=== Lion City Sailors ===
On 20 January 2021, Lopes moved to Asia to signed with Singaporean club Lion City Sailors for a Singapore record transfer fee of SGD $2.9 million (€1.8m). On 11 April 2021, he scored first hat-trick for the club and provided 2 assists against Geylang International in a massive 8–0 away win. In Lopes first season, he helped the Sailors to win the 2021 Singapore Premier League title.

On 19 February 2022, Lopes started the 2022 season by providing an assist which sees the club to win the 2022 Singapore Community Shield. In the 2022 AFC Champions League group stage fixtures on 18 April 2022, Lopes scored the second goal which sees his club gaining media attention by defeating Korean club, Daegu FC 3–0 and giving them the 3 points in the table. Lopes ended the season being named in the 2022 Singapore Premier League Team of the Year.

On 25 September 2023, Lopes scored a hat-trick and provided 2 assists in the 2023 Singapore Cup fixtures against Balestier Khalsa in a huge 7–0 victory. On 9 December 2023, he helped the club to lift the 2023 Singapore Cup. On 15 December 2023, Lion City Sailors announced that Lopes will be departing the club at the end of 2023 following the expiry of his contract, rounding up a successful three-year spell in which he won every major trophy in Singapore football, while accumulating 31 goals and 32 assists in 85 matches across all competitions for the club.

=== Qingdao Hainiu ===
On 12 February 2024, Lopes joined Chinese Super League club Qingdao Hainiu. He made his debut for the club in a 2–0 lost against Chengdu Rongcheng on 2 March 2024.

== Career statistics ==
As of 2 Nov 2024

Appearances and goals by club, season and competition
Club	Season	League			National cup		League cup		Continental		Total	
Club	Season	Division	Apps	Goals	Apps	Goals	Apps	Goals	Apps	Goals	Apps	Goals
Rio Ave (loan)	2012–13	Primeira Liga	21	0	1	0	4	1	—		26	1
Rio Ave	2013–14	Primeira Liga	27	0	6	0	5	0	—		38	0
Rio Ave	2014–15	Primeira Liga	32	5	7	2	2	0	8 (Note: Appearances in the Europa League)	2	49	9
Rio Ave	Total		59	5	13	2	7	0	8	2	87	9
Benfica	2015–16	Primeira Liga	0	0	0	0	0	0	0	0	0	0
Kayserispor (loan)	2015–16	Süper Lig	22	0	7	3	—		—		29	3
América Mineiro (loan)	2016	Série A	5	0	0	0	—		—		5	0
Panetolikos (loan)	2016–17	Super League Greece	14	0	1	0	—		—		15	0
Panetolikos (loan)	2017–18	Super League Greece	8	1	0	0	—		—		8	1
Panetolikos (loan)	Total		22	1	1	0	—		0	0	23	1
Rio Ave	2017–18	Primeira Liga	12	2	—		—		—		12	2
Rio Ave	2018–19	Primeira Liga	19	2	2	0	2	1	0	0	23	3
Rio Ave	2019–20	Primeira Liga	30	6	2	0	3	1	0	0	35	7
Rio Ave	2020–21	Primeira Liga	11	1	2	1	0	0	2	0	15	2
Rio Ave	Total		72	11	6	1	5	2	2	0	85	14
Lion City Sailors	2021	Singapore Premier League	19	6	0	0	0	0	0	0	19	6
Lion City Sailors	2022	Singapore Premier League	25	10	2	0	1	0	6	1	34	11
Lion City Sailors	2023	Singapore Premier League	23	8	2	4	0	0	2	1	27	13
Lion City Sailors	Total		67	24	4	4	1	0	8	2	80	30
Qingdao Hainiu	2024	Chinese Super League	24	3	0	0	—		—		24	3
Career total			292	44	32	10	17	3	18	4	359	61

== Honours ==
Rio Ave

- Taça de Portugal runner-up: 2013–14
- Taça da Liga runner-up: 2013–14
- Supertaça Cândido de Oliveira runner-up: 2014

Lion City Sailors

- Singapore Premier League: 2021
- Singapore Community Shield: 2022
- Singapore Cup: 2023

Individual

- Singapore Premier League Team of the Year: 2022, 2023
