= Tajeli Salamat =

Singaporean footballer

Personal information
- Full name: Tajeli bin Salamat
- Date of birth: 7 February 1994 (age 32)
- Place of birth: Singapore
- Height: 1.75 m (5 ft 9 in)
- Positions: Full-back; centre-back

Team information
- Current team: Balestier Khalsa
- Number: 3

Youth career
- Jurong Town
- –2012: National Football Academy

Senior career*
Years	Team	Apps	(Gls)
2012–2013	Young Lions	20	(0)
2014	Balestier Khalsa	18	(1)
2016	Young Lions	4	(0)
2017	Balestier Khalsa	20	(1)
2018–2019	Warriors	40	(0)
2020–2022	Lion City Sailors	33	(2)
2022	→ Geylang International (loan)	16	(3)
2023	Tanjong Pagar United	20	(1)
2024	Balestier Khalsa	14	(0)
2025	Hougang United	10	(0)
2025	Geylang International	4	(0)
2026–	Balestier Khalsa	20	(1)

International career^{‡}
2019	Singapore U23	4	(0)
2021	Singapore	2	(0)
- * Club domestic league appearances and goals as of 21 November 2026 ‡ National team caps and goals as of 25 December 2021

Tajeli bin Salamat (born February 7, 1994) is a Singaporean professional footballer who plays as a full-back or centre-back for Singapore Premier League club Balestier Khalsa and the Singapore national team.

== Club career ==
=== Young Lions ===
Tajeli started his professional career with Young Lions after graduating with NFA in 2012. He make his debut on 17 February in a 3–0 lost to Hougang United.

=== Balestier Khalsa ===
In January 2014, Tajeli joined Balestier Khalsa. He make his debut in a 4–0 win over his former club Young Lions on 23 February. Tajeli scored his first career goal in a 3–0 win over Home United on 20 June.

=== Lions City Sailors ===
During the Sailors' 2022 AFC Champions League campaign in Buriram, Thailand, Tajeli and midfielder Anumanthan Kumar were expelled from the squad and sent back to Singapore for breaking the team's curfew.

== International career ==
Tajeli was called up to the Singapore U23 as an overage player at the age of 25 for the 2019 SEA Games in Manila. He made his SEA Games debut in a 0–0 draw against Laos U23. During the SEA Games, Tajeli and eight footballers broke curfew. He, along with the other eight players, was subsequently punished with a fine by the Singapore National Olympic Council.

On 11 November 2021, Tajeli made his international debut for the Singapore national team in an International 'A' Friendly match against Kyrgyzstan at the Dolen Omurzakov Stadium.

== Career statistics ==
As of 21 November 2026.

Club	Season	S.League		Singapore Cup		Singapore League Cup / Singapore Community Shield		Continental		Total	
Club	Season	Apps	Goals	Apps	Goals	Apps	Goals	Apps	Goals	Apps	Goals
Young Lions	2012	6	0	0	0	0	0	0	0	6	0
Young Lions	2013	14	0	0	0	3	0	0	0	17	0
Young Lions	Total	20	0	0	0	3	0	0	0	23	0
Balestier Khalsa	2014	18	1	3	0	4	0	0	0	25	1
Young Lions	2016	4	0	0	0	0	0	0	0	4	0
Balestier Khalsa	2017	20	1	1	0	3	0	0	0	24	1
Tiong Bahru	2018	0	0	0	0	0	0	0	0	0	0
Warriors	2018	19	0	2	0	0	0	0	0	21	0
Warriors	2019	21	0	6	1	0	0	0	0	27	1
Warriors	Total	40	0	8	1	0	0	0	0	48	1
Lion City Sailors	2020	14	2	0	0	0	0	0	0	14	2
Lion City Sailors	2021	13	0	0	0	0	0	0	0	13	0
Lion City Sailors	2022	6	0	0	0	1	0	2	0	9	0
Lion City Sailors	Total	33	2	0	0	1	0	2	0	36	2
Geylang International	2022	16	3	3	0	0	0	0	0	19	3
Tanjong Pagar United	2023	20	1	2	0	0	0	0	0	22	1
Balestier Khalsa	2024–25	14	0	0	0	0	0	0	0	14	0
Hougang United	2024–25	10	0	2	0	0	0	0	0	12	0
Geylang International	2025–26	4	0	0	0	0	0	0	0	4	0
Balestier Khalsa	2025–26	13	1	4	0	0	0	0	0	17	1
Balestier Khalsa	2026-27	7	0	0	0	0	0	0	0	7	0
Balestier Khalsa	Total	20	1	4	0	0	0	0	0	24	1
Career Total		219	9	23	1	11	0	2	0	255	10

=== International ===
Appearances and goals by national team and year
National team	Year	Apps	Goals
Singapore	2021	2	0
Total		2	0

== Honours ==
=== Balestier Khalsa ===
- Singapore Cup: 2014

=== Lion City Sailors ===
- Singapore Premier League: 2021
- Singapore Community Shield: 2022

=== Individual ===
- Singapore Premier League Team of the Year: 2020
