= Richairo Živković =

Curaçaoan footballer (born 1996)

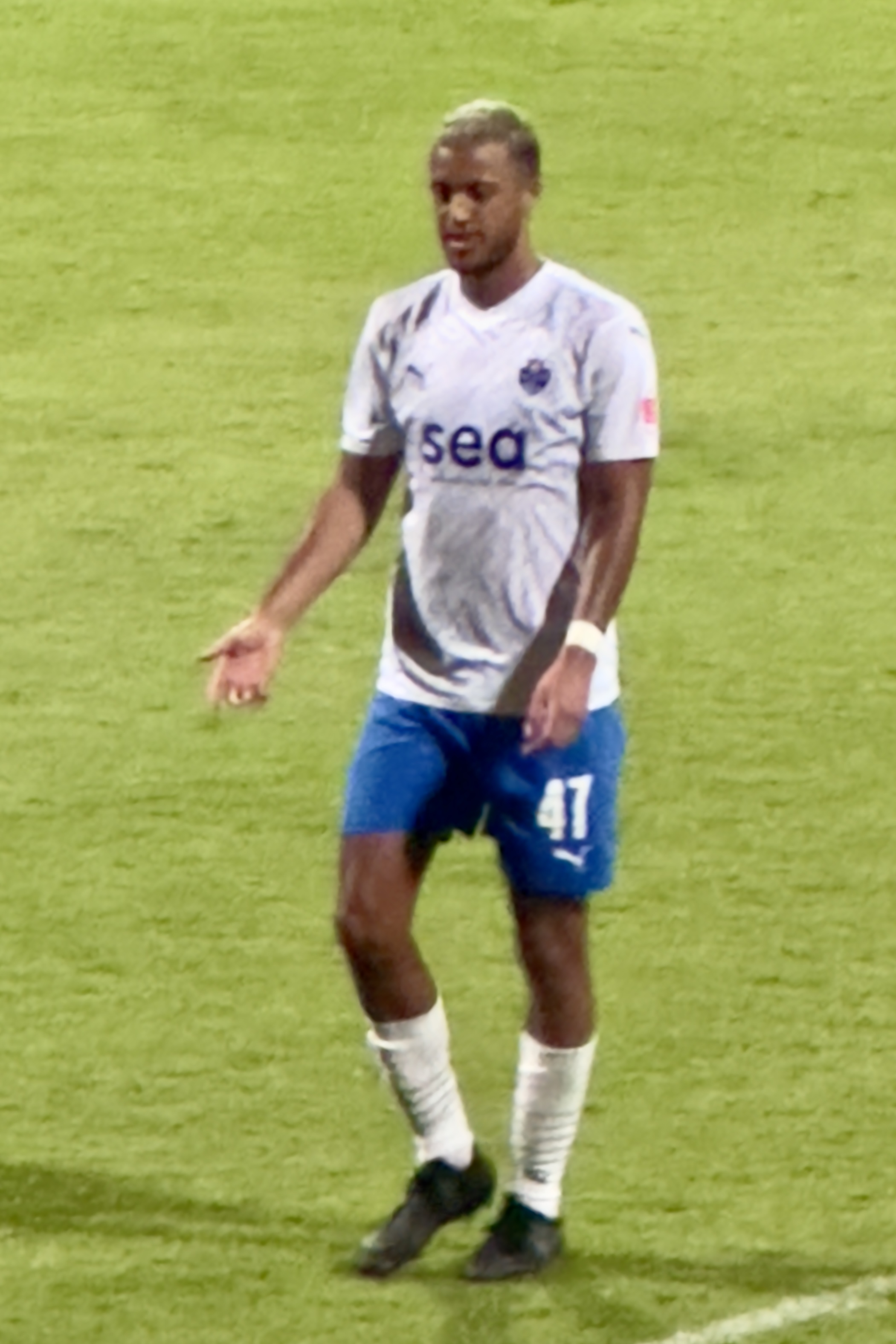
- Živković playing for Lion City Sailors in 2024.

Personal information
- Full name: Richairo Juliano Živković
- Date of birth: 5 September 1996 (age 30)
- Place of birth: Assen, Netherlands
- Height: 1.87 m (6 ft 2 in)
- Position: Forward

Team information
- Current team: Vanspor
- Number: 30

Youth career
- 2003–2007: FVV Foxhol
- 2007–2012: Groningen

Senior career*
Years	Team	Apps	(Gls)
2012–2014	Groningen	33	(10)
2014–2017	Ajax	7	(1)
2014–2016	→ Jong Ajax	40	(27)
2015	→ Willem II (loan)	16	(2)
2016–2017	→ Utrecht (loan)	34	(9)
2017–2019	Oostende	50	(12)
2019–2021	Changchun Yatai	30	(15)
2020	→ Sheffield United (loan)	5	(0)
2020	→ Guangzhou R&F (loan)	6	(1)
2021–2022	Red Star Belgrade	9	(0)
2022–2023	Emmen	36	(6)
2023–2024	Lion City Sailors	7	(6)
2024–2026	Bangkok United	34	(13)
2026–	Vanspor	5	(1)

International career
2013	Netherlands U18	1	(0)
2013–2015	Netherlands U19	10	(4)
2015–2016	Netherlands U20	6	(0)
2017–2018	Netherlands U21	9	(4)
2023	Curaçao	2	(0)
- * Club domestic league appearances and goals as of 7 November 2026

Richairo Juliano Živković (Serbian: Ришаиро Жулијано Живковић/Rišairo Žulijano Živković; born 5 September 1996) is a professional footballer who plays as a forward for Turkish TFF 1. Lig club Vanspor. Born in the Netherlands, he represents the Curaçao national team.

== Club career ==
=== FC Groningen ===
Born in Assen, Živković began playing football at FVV from Foxhol. He was noticed early on due to his agility and speed, and at the age of 11 he left for the youth academy of FC Groningen where he progressed. He brought more attention to himself due to his performance for the reserves team, and by the end of 2012 he signed a three-year contract with the club.

On 2 December 2012, Živković came on as an 84th-minute substitute in the first team's 2–0 win over Heracles Almelo, making him the youngest debutant in the history of the club. On 3 August 2013, the first match day of the 2013–14 Eredivisie season, he scored his first regular season goal for the club, thereby relieving Arjen Robben as the youngest to have ever scored for Groningen. His talent did not go unnoticed, with 11 top football clubs enquiring about him by November 2013, including the likes of Real Madrid and FC Barcelona.

=== Ajax ===
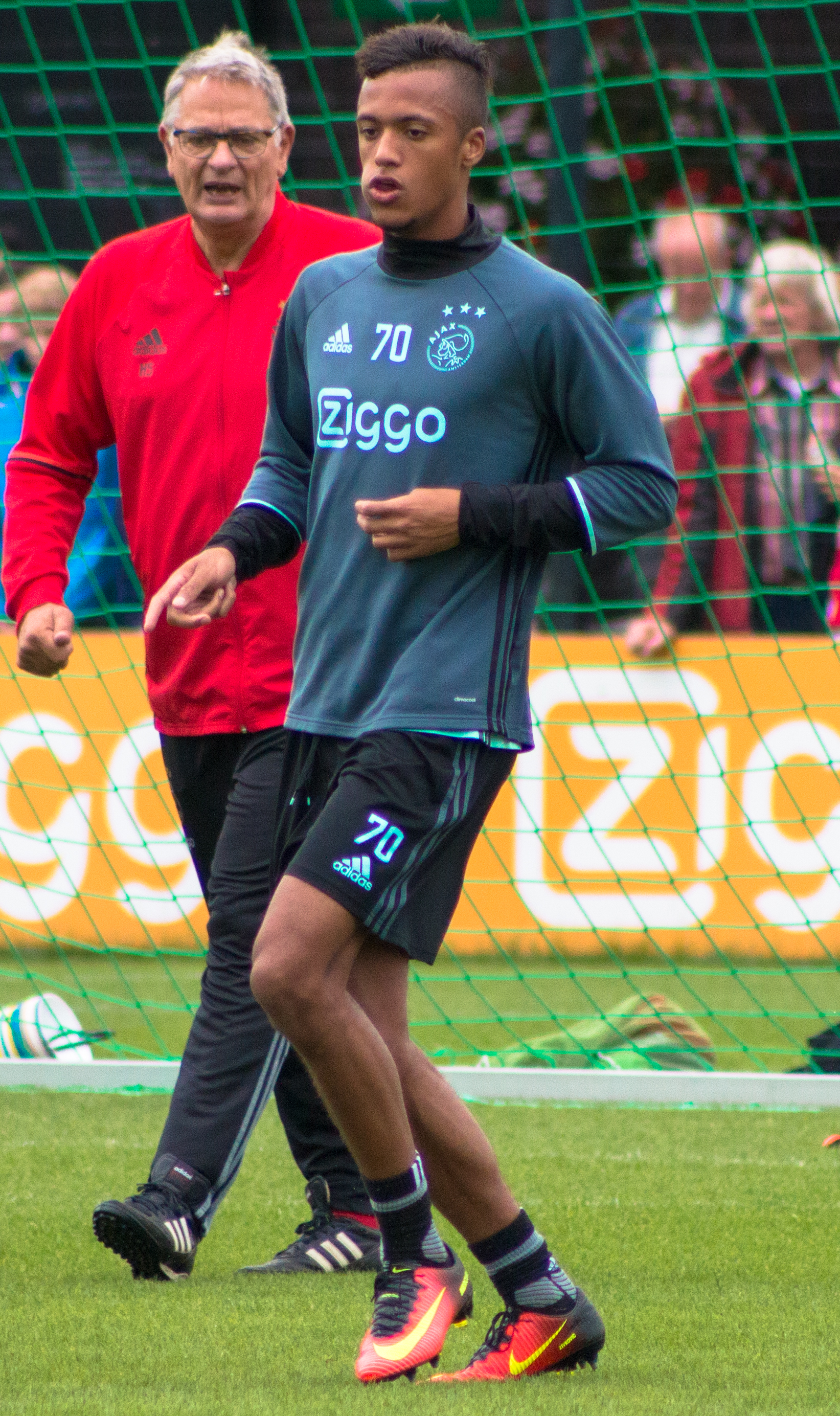
Živković in training with Ajax in 2016.

On 17 March 2014, Živković agreed to sign for Ajax, taking a three-year contract starting 1 July 2014. FC Groningen also received Ajax forward Danny Hoesen, as well as a percentage of Živković's transfer fee should Ajax sell the player before the expiration of his contract, hereby following in the footsteps of Luis Suárez who had transferred from Groningen to Ajax before him. On 5 June 2014, Živković made his debut for Ajax in a friendly match against Wacker Innsbruck concluding the club's pre-season training camp in Austria. He scored the final goal in the 46th minute of the 5–1 victory. He made his competitive debut for the reserves team Jong Ajax in the Eerste Divisie season opener, a North Holland derby match which resulted in a 3–0 win at home against SC Telstar. He scored his first goal for the reserves in his second appearance from a penalty kick in the 55th minute against Fortuna Sittard, which resulted in a 2–0 win. He made his third appearance for the reserves team in another North Holland derby match against neighbouring FC Volendam. The game ended in a 5–0 loss at home. Živković was sent off receiving a red card in the 59th minute following the ejection of Ajax goalkeeper Peter Leeuwenburgh in the 35th minute of the match.

On 28 October 2014, Živković made his regular season debut in the first team, playing in the third round KNVB Cup away match against SV Urk. Coming on as 46th-minute substitute for Arkadiusz Milik, he scored the final goal in the 89th minute of the 4–0 victory. Scoring on his debut for the first team, Živković became the 50th Ajax player to do so since the introduction of professional football in the Netherlands.

=== Willem II (loan) ===
On 22 June 2015, Živković was sent on loan at Willem II, together with Lesly de Sa and Ruben Ligeon. On 1 July 2015, he scored the first four goals in a friendly game against Jong Brabant which ended 0–12. Lesley de Sa also added a goal in that game. However, he already returned to Ajax in February 2016, as his loan at Willem II did not turn out to be a success.

=== FC Utrecht (loan) ===
Živković started the 2016–17 season with Jong Ajax for which he scored three times in two matches. Especially after the arrival of Bertrand Traoré at Ajax, his prospects for playing time with the first team of Ajax decreased. On 16 August 2016, he was sent on loan to FC Utrecht until the end of the season.

=== KV Oostende ===
On 16 June 2017, Živković signed for Belgian Pro League club KV Oostende on a four-year contract. The transfer fee was not announced, however FC Groningen would receive 10% of the amount received by Ajax in the transfer.

=== Changchun Yatai ===
On 18 February 2019, Živković moved to second tier Chinese club Changchun Yatai for the 2019 China League One season. On 4 May 2019, he bagged his first senior hat-trick in a league match against Xinjiang Tianshan Leopard in a 3–4 away win.

=== Sheffield United (loan) ===
On 31 January 2020, Živković signed for English Premier league club, Sheffield United on a six-month loan until the end of the 2019–20 Premier League season, with the deal including an option to buy.

=== Emmen ===
On 25 July 2022, Živković joined Emmen for one year with an option for a second.

=== Lion City Sailors ===
On 11 July 2023, Živković joined Singapore Premier League outfit, Lion City Sailors on a one-year contract. He donned the no.34 jersey in tribute to his former Ajax teammate, Abdelhak Nouri who still suffered from a cardiac arrhythmia back in 2017 and in still recovering in the process. On 16 July 2023, Živković scored his first goal for the club in a match against Albirex Niigata (S). On 25 September 2023, he scored first club hat-trick and providing two assist in the 2023 Singapore Cup fixtures against Balestier Khalsa in a 7–0 home win. On 4 October 2023, Živković scored his first AFC Champions League goal in a 2–1 away win against Hong Kong side, Kitchee. On 8 November 2023, Živković scored a brace against Korean giant, Jeonbuk Hyundai Motors helping the club to another historic win. On 9 December 2023, he scored a penalty from the spot which ended up as a 3–-1 win against Hougang United which saw him lifting the 2023 Singapore Cup with the club. Živković left the club on 30 May 2024.

=== Bangkok United ===
On 9 July 2024, Živković moved to Thai League 1 club Bangkok United.

== International career ==
Through his parents' respective origins, Živković is eligible to represent Serbia, Montenegro, Curaçao or the Netherlands.

Following his first Eredivisie goal earlier in the month, Živković was called up to the Netherlands under-19 team on 22 August 2013. He has also represented the Netherlands at under-20 and under-21 level.

In March 2023, Živković received his first call-up to the Curaçao senior national team for the CONCACAF Nations League A fixtures in which he make his debut against Canada. On 29 March 2023, He make his second appearances in a friendly against Argentina at the Estadio Único Madre de Ciudades.

== Personal life ==
Živković carries the last name of his mother Mira, who is originally from Serbia; his father, who left the family when Živković was little, was from Curaçao. In addition to Dutch, he speaks Serbian.

== Career statistics ==
As of match played on 7 Nov 2025

Appearances and goals by club, season and competition
Club	Season	League			National cup		League cup		Continental (Note: Includes UEFA Champions League and UEFA Europa League)		Total	
Club	Season	Division	Apps	Goals	Apps	Goals	Apps	Goals	Apps	Goals	Apps	Goals
Groningen	2012–13	Eredivisie	4	0	1	0	—		0	0	5	0
Groningen	2013–14	Eredivisie	33	11	2	0	—		0	0	35	11
Groningen	Total		37	11	3	0	0	0	0	0	40	11
Ajax	2014–15	Eredivisie	7	1	2	1	—		2	0	11	2
Jong Ajax	2014–15	Eerste Divisie	25	18	—		—		—		25	18
Jong Ajax	2015–16	Eerste Divisie	13	6	—		—		—		13	6
Jong Ajax	2016–17	Eerste Divisie	2	3	—		—		—		2	3
Jong Ajax	Total		40	27	0	0	0	0	0	0	40	27
Willem II (loan)	2015–16	Eredivisie	16	2	2	2	—		0	0	18	4
Utrecht (loan)	2016–17	Eredivisie	34	9	4	3	—		0	0	38	12
Oostende	2017–18	Belgian First Division A	29	9	2	2	—		0	0	31	11
Oostende	2018–19	Belgian First Division A	21	3	4	2	—		0	0	25	5
Oostende	Total		50	12	6	4	0	0	0	0	56	16
Changchun Yatai	2019	China League One	25	15	0	0	—		—		25	15
Changchun Yatai	2021	Chinese Super League	5	0	0	0	—		—		5	0
Changchun Yatai	Total		30	15	0	0	0	0	0	0	30	15
Sheffield United (loan)	2019–20	Premier League	5	0	0	0	—		—		5	0
Guangzhou R&F (loan)	2020	Chinese Super League	6	1	2	3	—		—		8	4
Red Star Belgrade	2021–22	Serbian SuperLiga	9	0	1	1	—		4	0	14	1
Emmen	2022–23	Eredivisie	29	5	5	2	—		—		34	7
Lion City Sailors	2023	Singapore Premier League	7	6	2	3	—		4	3	13	12
Lion City Sailors	2024–25	Singapore Premier League	0	0	0	0	—		0	0	0	0
Lion City Sailors	Total		7	6	2	3	0	0	4	3	13	12
Bangkok United	2024–25	Thai League 1	27	9	3	1	2	0	8 (Note: Includes one appearance in AFC Champions League Elite playoff and seven appearances in AFC Champions League Two)	5 (Note: Includes one goal in AFC Champions League Elite playoff and three goals in AFC Champions League Two)	40	15
Bangkok United	2025–26	Thai League 1	7	4	0	0	0	0	4 (Note: Includes one appearance in AFC Champions League Elite playoff and three appearances in AFC Champions League Two)	0	11	4
Bangkok United	Total		34	13	3	1	2	0	12	5	51	19
Career total			304	102	30	20	2	0	22	8	358	130

== Honours ==
Red Star Belgrade

- Serbian SuperLiga: 2021–22
- Serbian Cup: 2021–22

Lion City Sailors

- Singapore Cup: 2023
