= Pedro Dias (footballer, born 1992) =

Brazilian footballer

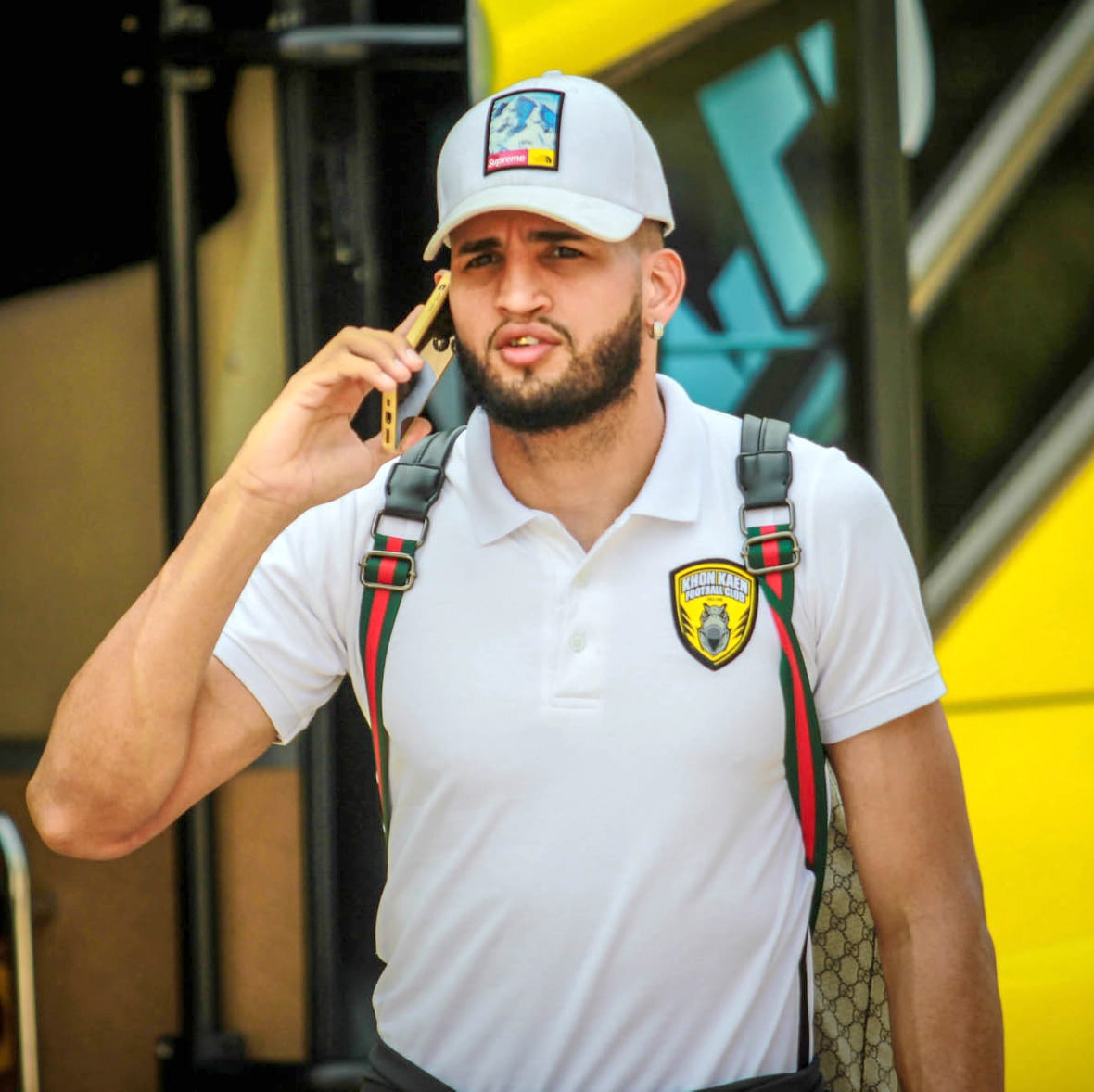

Personal information
- Full name: Pedro Henrique Dias de Amorim
- Date of birth: 23 September 1992 (age 34)
- Place of birth: Manaus, Brazil
- Height: 1.89 m (6 ft 2 in)
- Position: Centre-back

Senior career*
| Years | Team | Apps | (Gls) |
| 2011 | Nacional | 5 | (0) |
| 2012 | São Raimundo | 8 | (0) |
| 2014 | Nacional | 25 | (2) |
| 2014 | Oeste | 18 | (3) |
| 2014–2015 | Campinense | 16 | (2) |
| 2016 | Potiguar | 22 | (2) |
| 2016–2017 | Itapemirim | 27 | (2) |
| 2017 | Highlands Park | 10 | (1) |
| 2019 | Sarawak FA | 12 | (2) |
| 2019–2020 | Nakhon Pathom United | 28 | (4) |
| 2020–2021 | Khon Kaen | 25 | (0) |
| 2021–2022 | Sisaket United | 20 | (2) |
| 2022 | Samut Sakhon City | 14 | (2) |
| 2023 | Tanjong Pagar United | 15 | (1) |
| 2024–2025 | Persija Jakarta | 4 | (1) |
- * Club domestic league appearances and goals as of 21 December 2024

Pedro Henrique Dias de Amorim (born 23 September 1992) is a Brazilian former professional footballer who plays as a centre-back.

== Club career ==
=== Nakhon Pathom United ===
Pedro signed for the Thailand side after playing in South Africa.

=== Sarawak ===
On 25 January 2019, Pedro signed a contract with Malaysia Premier League side, from Nakhon Pathom United.

=== Tanjong Pagar United ===
Pedro signed for Tanjong Pagar United for the 2023 season after a successful referral by his agent.

=== Persija Jakarta ===
On 5 August 2024, Persija Jakarta officially brought in Pedro on a contract duration of one season.
