= 2025–26 Geylang International FC season =

Geylang International
2025–26 season
- Chairman: Thomas Gay
- Head coach: Mohd Noor Ali
- Stadium: Our Tampines Hub, Tampines
- Singapore Premier League: TBD
- Singapore Cup: TBD
- Top goalscorer: League: TBD; All: TBD
Home colours	Away colours

The 2025–26 season is Geylang International's 30th consecutive season in the top flight of Singapore football and in the Singapore Premier League. Along with the Singapore Premier League, the club will also compete in the Singapore Cup.

== Squad ==
=== Singapore Premier League ===
No.	Name	Nationality	Date of birth (age)	Previous club	Contract since	Contract end
Goalkeepers
1	Yu Kanoshima	(Japan)	5 May 2003 (age 23)	(Japan) Ryutsu Keizai University	2026	2026
13	Hamzah Azizi	(Singapore)		(Singapore) Geylang International U17	2023	2026
24	Rudy Khairullah	(Singapore)	19 July 1994 (age 32)	(Singapore) Lion City Sailors	2023	2026
28	Aniq Zulfadli Matin	(Singapore)	11 May 2007 (age 19)	(Singapore) Geylang International U21	2023	2026
85	Isa Faisal ^{U19}	(Singapore)		(Singapore) Geylang International U19	2025	2026
Defenders
3	Kim Tae-ho	(South Korea)	1 January 2002 (age 24)	(South Korea) Paju Frontier (K3)	2026	2026
5	Iqram Rifqi	(Singapore)	25 February 1996 (age 30)	(Singapore) Starlight Soccerites (SFL)	2025	2026
11	Shakir Hamzah	(Singapore)	20 October 1992 (age 34)	(Singapore) Tanjong Pagar United	2024	2026
15	Nikola Ignjatovic	(Serbia)	2 February 1998 (age 28)	(Serbia) FK Smederevo 1924 (S2)	2025	2026
16	Ko Jae-hyun	(South Korea)	1 January 2002 (age 24)	(South Korea) Calvin University	2025	2026
19	Raiyan Noor	(Singapore)	20 January 2006 (age 20)	(Singapore) Geylang International U21	2023	2026
23	Nazrul Nazari	(Singapore)	11 February 1991 (age 35)	(Singapore) Hougang United	2025	2026
26	Nizwan Izzairie	(Singapore)	26 January 2005 (age 21)	(Singapore) Geylang International U21	2023	2026
27	Faisal Shahril	(Singapore)	7 May 1997 (age 29)	(Singapore) Lion City Sailors	2026	2026
36	Shaquille Danish	(Singapore)		(Singapore) Geylang International U21	2023	2026
43	Denilson	(Singapore)		(Singapore) Geylang International U21	2023	2026
44	Irfan Rifqi	(Singapore)	22 May 2006 (age 20)	(Singapore) BG Tampines Rovers U21	2024	2026
48	Sho Gamoh	(Singapore) (Japan)	1 May 2008 (age 18)	(Singapore) Geylang International U21	2024	2026
91	Azirul Aziq ^{U19}	(Singapore)		(Singapore) Geylang International U17	2024	2026
96	Hanan Hadi ^{U19}	(Singapore)		(Singapore) Geylang International U17	2024	2026
	Zamir Nasri ^{U19}	(Singapore)		(Singapore) National Development Center	2026	2026
Midfielders
6	Gareth Low	(Singapore)	28 February 1997 (age 29)	(Japan) Albirex Niigata (S)	2025	2026
8	Joshua Pereira	(Singapore)	10 October 1997 (age 29)	(Singapore) SAFSA	2020	2026
10	Vincent Bezecourt	(France)	10 June 1993 (age 33)	(Armenia) FC Alashkert (A1)	2022	2026
14	Ethan Henry Pinto	(Singapore)	14 October 2004 (age 22)	(Singapore) Young Lions	2025	2026
18	Shahdan Sulaiman	(Singapore)	9 May 1988 (age 38)	(Singapore) Hougang United	2025	2026
20	Shodai Yokoyama	(Japan)	14 October 2000 (age 26)	(Singapore) Hougang United	2025	2026
21	Ryu Hardy Yussri	(Singapore)	20 April 2005 (age 21)	(Singapore) Young Lions	2025	2026
22	Kaisei Ogawa	(Japan)	25 February 2001 (age 25)	(Singapore) Young Lions	2025	2026
29	Danie Hafiy	(Singapore)	6 April 2004 (age 22)	(Singapore) Young Lions	2026	2026
31	Josh Tan	(Singapore)	10 August 2005 (age 21)	(Singapore) Geylang International U21	2023	2026
32	Timothy Cheng	(England) (Singapore) (Hong Kong)	25 August 2005 (age 21)	Singapore Cricket Club	2025	2026
33	Kyan Neo	(Singapore)		(Singapore) Geylang International U21	2023	2026
34	Abdusukur Abduryim	(Norway)	5 October 2002 (age 24)	(Norway) Lambertseter IF	2026	2026
35	Andry Akimi	(Singapore)	18 July 2008 (age 18)	(Singapore) Geylang International U17	2023	2026
37	Paythn Banesh	(Singapore)		(Singapore) Geylang International U17	2024	2026
40	Sachin Dev Balamurali	(Singapore)	16 December 2007 (age 18)	(Singapore) Geylang International U21	2024	2026
42	Yusril Hanapi	(Singapore)	7 May 2006 (age 20)	(Singapore) BG Tampines Rovers U21	2026	2026
47	Nur Ikhsanuddin	(Singapore)	15 October 2005 (age 21)	(Singapore) Geylang International U21	2022	2026
67	Uday Ghoshal ^{U19}	(Singapore)	9 January 2008 (age 18)	(Singapore) Geylang International U17	2025	2026
94	Damien Chow ^{U19}	(Singapore)	1 March 2008 (age 18)	(Singapore) Geylang International U17	2023	2026
Forwards
4	Shuhei Hoshino	(Japan)	19 December 1995 (age 30)	(Japan) Albirex Niigata (S)	2025	2026
7	Riku Fukashiro	(Japan)	12 April 2000 (age 26)	(Singapore) Balestier Khalsa	2025	2026
9	Ryoya Tanigushi	(Japan)	31 August 1999 (age 27)	(Singapore) Balestier Khalsa	2024	2025
17	Amy Recha	(Singapore) (Indonesia)	13 May 1992 (age 34)	(Japan) Albirex Niigata (S)	2026	2026
30	Prince Rio Rifae'i	(Singapore)	27 January 2008 (age 18)	(Singapore) Geylang International U21	2024	2026
86	Kiran Valentin Raab	(Singapore) (Germany)		(Japan) Albirex Niigata (S) U17	2026	2026
90	Vedant Raj	(Singapore)		(Singapore) Geylang International U19	2024	2026
97	David Sassarak ^{U19}	(Singapore) (Thailand)		(Singapore) Geylang International U17	2023	2026
	Arihaan Bose	(Australia)		(Singapore) ActiveSG U17	2026	2026
Players who left during season
2	Danial Crichton	(Singapore) (Scotland) (Canada)	11 April 2003 (age 23)	(Singapore) Young Lions	2025	2026
3	Tajeli Salamat	(Singapore)	7 February 1994 (age 32)	(Singapore) Hougang United	2025	2026
5	Ho Wai Loon	(Singapore)	20 August 1993 (age 33)	(Japan) Albirex Niigata (S)	2025	2026
13	Zainol Gulam	(Singapore)	4 February 1992 (age 34)	(Japan) Albirex Niigata (S)	2026	2026
13	Kimura Riki	(Singapore) (Japan)	14 November 2000 (age 26)	(Singapore) Tanjong Pagar United	2026	2026
17	Hairil Sufi	(Singapore)	27 May 2000 (age 26)	(Singapore) Jungfrau Punggol	2025	2026
29	Irfan Iskandar	(Singapore)	16 August 2004 (age 22)	(Singapore) Hougang United U21	2025	2026
37	Shafeeq Ameer	(Singapore)	1 August 2005 (age 21)	(Singapore) Hougang United U21	2025	2026
35	Azakhir Azali	(Singapore)		(Singapore) Geylang International U21	2023	2026
	Naufal Affandi	(Singapore)		(Singapore) Geylang International U21	2024	2026
Players loaned out
42	Adam Irfan	(Singapore) (Indonesia)		(Singapore) Geylang International U21	2023	2026
Players left for NS
25	Ahmad Munthaha Sriwaluya	(Singapore) (Indonesia)		(Singapore) BG Tampines Rovers U21	2025	2026
27	Hud Ismail	(Singapore)	6 April 2005 (age 21)	(Singapore) Geylang International U21	2024	2026
49	Syafi Suhaimi	(Singapore)	13 October 2006 (age 20)	(Singapore) Geylang International U21	2023	2026
	Christos Chua	(Singapore) (Greece)	29 October 2004 (age 22)	(Singapore) Geylang International U21	2022	2025
	Syazwan Latiff	(Singapore)	21 February 2006 (age 20)	(Singapore) BG Tampines Rovers U21	2023	2025

Remarks:
^{FP U21} These players are registered as U21 foreign players.

== Coaching staff ==
First Team

Position	Name	Ref.
Chairman	(Singapore) Thomas Gay	
Vice-chairman	(China) Shi Kan	
General manager	(Singapore) Berince Wong	
Team Manager	(Singapore) Imran Zainal	
Head coach	(Singapore) Mohd Noor Ali	(Note: 2 years contract till 2024)
Assistant Coach	(Singapore) Hasrin Jailani	
SPL2 Coach	(Singapore) Nor Azli Yusoff	
Goalkeeping Coach	(Singapore) Rezal Hassan	
Fitness Coach	(Singapore) Sofiyan Abdul Hamid	
Physiotherapist	(Singapore)	
Sports Trainer	(Singapore) Nurhaizal Sufri	
Kitman	(Singapore) Abdul Latiff	
Sports Scientist		

== Transfers ==
=== In ===
Pre-season

Date (Note: Date of club's announcement, will be either date of club announcement or 1 Jun-2025, the date which the free agent start due to lapse of previous contract)	Position	Player	Transferred from	Ref
First team
1 July 2025	MF	(Singapore) Ryu Hardy	(Singapore) Young Lions	Free
1 July 2025	FW	(Japan) Riku Fukashiro	(Singapore) Balestier Khalsa	Free
1 July 2025	FW	(Singapore) Irfan Iskandar	(Singapore) Hougang United	Free
2 July 2025	MF	(Japan) Kaisei Ogawa	(Singapore) Young Lions	Free
3 July 2025	DF	(Serbia) Nikola Ignjatovic	(Serbia) FK Smederevo 1924	Free
4 July 2025	MF	(Singapore) Ethan Henry Pinto	(Singapore) Young Lions	Free
7 July 2025	MF	(Japan) Shodai Yokoyama	(Singapore) Hougang United	Free
7 July 2025	MF	(Singapore) Nazrul Nazari	(Singapore) Hougang United	Free
8 July 2025	DF	(Singapore) (Scotland) (Canada) Danial Crichton	(Singapore) Young Lions	Free
14 July 2025	DF	(Singapore) Tajeli Salamat	(Singapore) Hougang United	Free
15 July 2025	FW	(Japan) Shuhei Hoshino	(Japan) Albirex Niigata (S)	Free
17 July 2025	MF	(Singapore) Ho Wai Loon	(Japan) Albirex Niigata (S)	Free (Note: Ho Wai Loon decided to retire as announced on 9 August)
28 July 2025	DF	(South Korea) Ko Jae-hyun	(South Korea) Calvin University	Free
28 July 2025	MF	(Singapore) Gareth Low	(Japan) Albirex Niigata (S)	Free
13 August 2025	MF	(Singapore) Shahdan Sulaiman	(Singapore) Hougang United	Free
23 August 2025	MF	(Singapore) Hairil Sufi	(Singapore) Jungfrau Punggol	Free

Mid-season

Date (Note: Date of club's announcement, will be either date of club announcement or 1 Jun-2025, the date which the free agent start due to lapse of previous contract)	Position	Player	Transferred from	Ref
First team
17 October 2025	DF	(Singapore) Iqram Rifqi	N.A.	Free
17 October 2025	MF	(Singapore) Ryu Hardy	(Singapore) Young Lions FC	End of loan (Note: Ryu Hardy loan curtailed early.)
1 January 2026	GK	(Singapore) (Japan) Kimura Riki	Free Agent	N.A.
1 January 2026	DF	(Singapore) Faisal Shahril	(Singapore) Lion City Sailors	Free
1 January 2026	MF	(Singapore) Yusril Hanapi	(Singapore) BG Tampines Rovers	Free
1 January 2026	MF	(England) (Singapore) (Hong Kong) Timothy Cheng	Singapore Cricket Club	Free
5 January 2026	FW	(Singapore) Amy Recha	(Japan) Albirex Niigata (S)	Free
6 January 2026	DF	(South Korea) Kim Tae-ho	(South Korea) Paju Frontier	Free
9 January 2026	MF	(Singapore) Danie Hafiy	(Singapore) Lion City Sailors U21	Season loan
10 January 2026	GK	(Japan) Yu Kanoshima	(Japan) Ryutsu Keizai University	Free

=== Out ===
Preseason

Date (Note: Date of club's announcement, will be either date of club announcement or 1 Jun-2025, the date which the free agent start due to lapse of previous contract)	Position	Player	Transferred To	Ref
First team
1 June 2025	MF	(Singapore) Saifullah Akbar	(Singapore) BG Tampines Rovers	End of loan
9 June 2025	MF	(Japan) Takahiro Tezuka	(Thailand) Bangkok (T2)	Free
14 June 2025	MF	(Japan) Tomoyuki Doi	(Thailand) BG Pathum United	Free
23 June 2025	DF	(Japan) Rio Sakuma	(Japan) Kamakura lnternational (J6)	Free
2 July 2025	MF	(Singapore) Ryu Hardy	(Singapore) Young Lions	Season loan till Dec-25
7 July 2025	MF	(Singapore) Naqiuddin Eunos	(Singapore) Tanjong Pagar United	Free
16 July 2025	GK	(Singapore) Hairul Syirhan	N.A.	Retired
16 July 2025	DF	(Singapore) Ahmad Syahir	N.A.	Retired
16 July 2025	DF	(Japan) Keito Hariya	(Singapore)	Free
16 July 2025	DF	(Singapore) Akmal Azman	(Singapore) Lion City Sailors (Note: To play mainly SPL2 squad)	Free
16 July 2025	DF	(Singapore) Faisal Shahril	(Singapore) Lion City Sailors (Note: To play mainly SPL2 squad)	Free
16 July 2025	MF	(Singapore) Huzaifah Aziz	(Singapore) Hougang United	Free
16 July 2025	FW	(Singapore) Iqbal Hussain	(Singapore)	Free
16 July 2025	FW	(Singapore) Naufal Azman	(Singapore) Lion City Sailors (Note: To play mainly SPL2 squad)	Free
16 July 2025	FW	(Singapore) (Greece) Zikos Vasileios Chua	(Singapore) BG Tampines Rovers	Free
9 August 2025	MF	(Singapore) Ho Wai Loon	N.A.	Retired (Note: Ho Wai Loon decided to retire as announced on 9 August)

Mid-Season

Date (Note: Date of club's announcement, will be either date of club announcement or 1 Jun-2025, the date which the free agent start due to lapse of previous contract)	Position	Player	Transferred To	Ref
First team
14 November 2025	DF	(Singapore) Tajeli Salamat	(Singapore) Balestier Khalsa	Free
31 December 2025	GK	(Singapore) Zainol Gulam	(Singapore)	Free
31 December 2025	MF	(Singapore) Shafeeq Ameer	(Singapore)	Free
31 December 2025	FW	(Singapore) Hairil Sufi	(Singapore)	Free
31 December 2025	FW	(Singapore) Irfan Iskandar	(Singapore) Balestier Khalsa	Free
February 2026	GK	(Singapore) (Japan) Kimura Riki	(Singapore)	Free
March 2026	DF	(Singapore) (Scotland) (Canada) Danial Crichton	Retired	N.A.

=== Retained / Extension / Promoted ===
Date (Note: Date of club's announcement, will be either date of club announcement or 1 Jun-2025, the date which the free agent start due to lapse of previous contract)	Position	Player	Ref
First team
11 June 2025	GK	(Singapore) Rudy Khairullah	1 years contract till Jun 2026
11 June 2025	DF	(Singapore) Shakir Hamzah	1 years contract till Jun 2026
11 June 2025	DF	(Singapore) Joshua Pereira	1 years contract till Jun 2026
11 June 2025	MF	(France) Vincent Bezecourt	1 years contract till Jun 2026
18 June 2025	FW	(Japan) Ryoya Tanigushi	1 years contract till Jun 2026
18 July 2025	DF	(Singapore) Raiyan Noor	Promoted. 1 years contract till Jun 2026
18 August 2025	GK	(Singapore) Aniq Zulfadli Matin	Promoted
18 August 2025	GK	(Singapore) Naufal Affandi	Promoted
18 August 2025	GK	(Singapore) Azakhir Azali	Promoted
18 August 2025	DF	(Singapore) Hud Ismail	Promoted
18 August 2025	DF	(Singapore) Syafi Suhaimi	Promoted
18 August 2025	DF	(Singapore) Nizwan Izzairie	Promoted
18 August 2025	DF	(Singapore) Shaquille Danish	Promoted
18 August 2025	DF	(Singapore) Denilson	Promoted
18 August 2025	DF	(Singapore) Irfan Rifqi	Promoted
18 August 2025	DF	(Singapore) (Japan) Sho Gamoh	Promoted
18 August 2025	MF	(Singapore) Prince Rio Rifae'i	Promoted
18 August 2025	MF	(Singapore) Nur Ikhsanuddin	Promoted
18 August 2025	MF	(Singapore) Sachin Dev Balamurali	Promoted
18 August 2025	FW	(Singapore) Adam Irfan	Promoted

== Friendly ==
=== Pre-season ===
Win Draw Loss

27 July 2025 1	Johor Darul Ta'zim II (Malaysia)	4–2	(Singapore) Geylang International	Johor
	Syukur Januri 9', 45'; Abdul Raziq 73', 90+2'			Stadium: Tan Sri Dato' Haji Hassan Yunos Stadium

Vietnam Tour (5–11 Aug)

6 August 2025 1	Cong An Ho Chi Minh City (Vietnam)	2–1	(Singapore) Geylang International	Ho Chi Minh City
	Nguyễn Tiến Linh; Endrick			Stadium: Thống Nhất Stadium

10 August 2025 2	Becamex Ho Chi Minh City (Vietnam)	1–1	(Singapore) Geylang International	Ho Chi Minh City
				Stadium: Gò Đậu Stadium

=== Mid-season ===
Win Draw Loss

10 October 2025 1	Geylang International (Singapore)	–	(Singapore) Jungfrau Punggol	Geylang
				Stadium: Geylang Training Centre

== Team statistics ==
=== Appearances and goals ===
As of 15 May 26

No.	Pos.	Player	SPL		Singapore Cup		Total	
No.	Pos.	Player	Apps.	Goals	Apps.	Goals	Apps.	Goals
1	GK	(Japan) Yu Kanoshima	4+1	0	0	0	5	0
3	DF	(South Korea) Kim Tae-ho	7+5	2	0	0	12	2
4	FW	(Japan) Shuhei Hoshino	19+2	5	4	2	25	7
5	DF	(Singapore) Iqram Rifqi	2+8	0	0+1	0	11	0
6	MF	(Singapore) Gareth Low	1+7	0	0+1	0	9	0
7	FW	(Japan) Riku Fukashiro	13+2	4	4	2	19	6
8	DF	(Singapore) Joshua Pereira	21	0	4	0	25	0
9	FW	(Japan) Ryoya Taniguchi	19	9	4	2	23	11
10	MF	(France) Vincent Bezecourt	19+2	2	3+1	2	25	4
14	MF	(Singapore) Ethan Henry Pinto	0+2	0	0+4	0	6	0
15	DF	(Serbia) Nikola Ignjatovic	20	1	4	0	24	1
16	DF	(South Korea) Ko Jae-hyun	2+4	0	0+2	0	8	0
17	FW	(Singapore) Amy Recha	3+10	0	0	0	13	0
18	MF	(Singapore) Shahdan Sulaiman	15+5	0	3	0	23	0
19	DF	(Singapore) Raiyan Noor	0+1	0	0+2	0	3	0
20	MF	(Japan) Shodai Yokoyama	19	2	4	0	23	2
21	MF	(Singapore) Ryu Hardy Yussri	1+7	0	0+3	0	11	0
22	MF	(Japan) Kaisei Ogawa	18+1	1	4	0	23	1
23	DF	(Singapore) Nazrul Nazari	19+1	0	4	0	24	0
24	GK	(Singapore) Rudy Khairullah	17+1	0	4	0	22	0
26	DF	(Singapore) Nizwan Izzairie	0	0	1	0	1	0
29	MF	(Singapore) Danie Hafiy	0	0	0	0	0	0
30	MF	(Singapore) Prince Rio Rifae'i	0+3	0	0	0	3	0
32	MF	(Hong Kong) (England) (Singapore) Timothy Cheng	0+2	0	0	0	2	0
34	MF	(Norway) (East Turkestan) Abdusukur Abduryim	0+4	0	0	0	4	0
40	MF	(Singapore) Sachin Dev Balamurali	0	0	0	0	0	0
47	MF	(Singapore) Nur Ikhsanuddin	0	0	0	0	0	0
Players who have played this season but had left the club or on loan to other club
25	DF	(Singapore) (Indonesia) Ahmad Munthaha Sriwaluya	0	0	0+1	0	1	0
27	DF	(Singapore) Hud Ismail	0	0	0	0	0	0
49	DF	(Singapore) Syafi Suhaimi	0+1	0	0	0	1	0
Players who have played this season but had left the club permanently
2	DF	(Singapore) (Scotland) (Canada) Danial Crichton	0	0	0+1	0	1	0
3	DF	(Singapore) Tajeli Salamat	2+2	0	0	0	4	0
11	DF	(Singapore) Shakir Hamzah	10	0	1	0	11	0
13	GK	(Singapore) Zainol Gulam	0	0	0	0	0	0
17	FW	(Singapore) Hairil Sufi	0	0	0	0	0	0
29	FW	(Singapore) Irfan Iskandar	0	0	0	0	0	0

== Competitions ==
=== Overview ===
Results summary (SPL)

Overall								Home						Away					
Pld	W	D	L	GF	GA	GD	Pts	W	D	L	GF	GA	GD	W	D	L	GF	GA	GD
0	0	0	0	0	0	0	0	0	0	0	0	0	0	0	0	0	0	0	0

=== Singapore Premier League ===
Win Draw Loss

24 August 2025 1	BG Tampines Rovers (Singapore)	0–0	(Singapore) Geylang International	Tampines
	Taufik Suparno (yellow card) 84'	Report	Shakir Hamzah (yellow card) 54'	Stadium: Our Tampines Hub; Referee: Muhammad Taqi; Man of the Match: (Japan) Riku Fukashiro

12 September 2025 2	Geylang International (Singapore)	0–2	(Japan) Albirex Niigata (S)	Jurong East
	Nikola Ignjatovic (yellow card) 70'; Nazrul Nazari (yellow card) 80'; Shakir Hamzah (yellow card) 83' (red card) 87'	Report	Shingo Nakano 45+3', 47'; Nicky Melvin Singh (yellow card) 82'	Stadium: Jurong East Stadium (Note: Location changed due to re-turfing of Our Tampines Hub); Referee: Ahmad A'Qashah; Man of the Match: (Japan) Shingo Nakano

19 September 2025 3	Hougang United (Singapore)	0–2	(Singapore) Geylang International	Tampines
	Kanok Kongsimma (yellow card) 18'; Anders Aplin (red card) 30'; Yuta Kikuchi (red card) 72'	Report	Riku Fukashiro 6' (yellow card) 20'; Ryoya Taniguchi 39'; Ko Jae-hyun (yellow card) 45+9'	Stadium: Our Tampines Hub (Note: Location changed due to re-turfing of Jalan Besar Stadium); Referee: Zulfiqar Mustaffa; Man of the Match: (Singapore) Rudy Khairullah

18 October 2025 4	Geylang International (Singapore)	2–1	(Singapore) Tanjong Pagar United	Tampines
	Nikola Ignjatovic 41' (yellow card) 13'; Ryoya Taniguchi 81'; Ko Jae-hyun (yellow card) 18'; Nazrul Nazari (yellow card) 80'; Ryu Hardy (yellow card) 90+5'	Report	Bruno Dybal 72' (yellow card) 90'; Kim Li-Kwan (yellow card) 41'	Stadium: Our Tampines Hub; Referee: Syarqawi Buhari; Man of the Match: (Japan) Ryoya Taniguchi

25 October 2025 5	Young Lions (Singapore)	1–3	(Singapore) Geylang International	Tampines
	Sergio Mendonça 17' (yellow card) 53'	Report	Shuhei Hoshino 20'; Vincent Bezecourt 58'; Riku Fukashiro 61'; Ryoya Taniguchi (penalty missed) 38; Shahdan Sulaiman (yellow card) 53'	Stadium: Our Tampines Hub (Note: Location changed due to re-turfing of Jalan Besar Stadium); Referee: Zulfiqar Mustaffa; Man of the Match: (France) Vincent Bezecourt

15 May 2026 6 (Rescheduled)	Geylang International (Singapore)	3–4	(Singapore) Balestier Khalsa	Tampines
	Shuhei Hoshino 29'; Riku Fukashiro 32'; Mario Subarić 89' (o.g.); Nikola Ignjatovic (red card) 72'		Daniel Goh 23'; Tin Matic 55'; Tajeli Salamat 78'; Ignatius Ang 90+4'; Lazar Vujanić (yellow card) 25' (yellow-red card) 66'	Stadium: Our Tampines Hub; Referee: Farhan Mohd; Man of the Match: (Singapore) Tajeli Salamat

18 January 2026 7	Geylang International (Singapore)	0–3	(Singapore) Lion City Sailors	Tampines
	Nikola Ignjatovic (yellow card) 42'	Report	Nazrul Nazari 43' (o.g.); Tsiy-William Ndenge 64'; Shawal Anuar 90+1'; Diogo Costa (yellow card) 5'; Bailey Wright (yellow card) 26'	Stadium: Our Tampines Hub; Referee: Farhan Mohd; Man of the Match: (Singapore) Shawal Anuar

23 January 2026 8	Geylang International (Singapore)	1–3	(Singapore) BG Tampines Rovers	Tampines
	Ryoya Taniguchi 74'	Report	Nikola Ignjatovic 20' (o.g.); Trent Buhagiar 54', 59'; Irfan Najeeb (yellow card) 51'; Koya Kazama (yellow card) 76'	Stadium: Our Tampines Hub; Referee: Mazlan Pagira; Man of the Match: (Malta) (Australia) Trent Buhagiar

2 February 2026 9	Albirex Niigata (S) (Japan)	2–0	(Singapore) Geylang International	Jurong East
	Nozomi Ozawa 67'; Liska Haaziq Iskandar 90+1'; Syed Firdaus (yellow card) 6'; Naoki Yoshioka (yellow card) 65'; Zulqarnaen Suzliman (yellow card) 68'; Abdul Rasaq (yellow card) 69'; Nicky Melvin Singh (yellow card) 89'	Report	Nazrul Nazari (yellow card) 59'; Hasrin Jailani (yellow card) 85'	Stadium: Jurong East Stadium; Referee: Zulfiqar Mustaffa; Man of the Match: (Japan) Nozomi Ozawa

6 February 2026 10	Tanjong Pagar United (Singapore)	1–3	(Singapore) Geylang International	Jurong East
	Emilio Estevez 90' (pen.); Raihan Rahman (yellow card) 46'	Report	Ryoya Taniguchi 11'; Shodai Yokoyama 52'; Vincent Bezecourt 67'; Shakir Hamzah (yellow card) 42'; Joshua Pereira (yellow card) 45+4'; Nazrul Nazari (yellow card) 49'; Amy Recha (yellow card) 56'; Yu Kanoshima (red card) 84'	Stadium: Jurong East Stadium; Referee: Jansen Foo; Man of the Match: (France) Vincent Bezecourt

15 February 2026 11	Geylang International (Singapore)	1–2	(Singapore) Hougang United	Tampines
	Ryoya Taniguchi 61'; Shodai Yokoyama (yellow card) 90+5'		Jaushua Sotirio 54'; Settawut Wongsai 83' (yellow card) 79'; Farhan Zulkifli (yellow card) 27'; Ryaan Sanizal (yellow card) 73'; Washington Jaramillo (yellow card) 80'	Stadium: Our Tampines Hub; Referee: Khairul Amri; Man of the Match: (Singapore) Farhan Zulkifli

20 February 2026 12	Balestier Khalsa (Singapore)	5–2	(Singapore) Geylang International	Bishan
	Nikola Ignjatovic 10' (o.g.); Jakov Katuša 15'; Bogdan Mandić 23', 29'; Masahiro Sugita 84'		Tin Matic 5' (o.g.); Shuhei Hoshino 45+3'; Nikola Ignjatovic (yellow card) 58'	Stadium: Bishan Stadium; Referee: Mazlan Pagira; Man of the Match: (Serbia) Bogdan Mandić

26 February 2026 13	Geylang International (Singapore)	1–1	(Singapore) Young Lions	Tampines
	Ryoya Taniguchi 18'; Joshua Pereira (yellow card) 61'; Iqram Rifqi (yellow card) 90+12'		Sergio Mendonça 44' (yellow card) 90+11'; Kieran Teo Jia Jun (yellow card) 17'; Fairuz Fazli Koh (yellow card) 26'; Harry Spence (yellow card) 87'; Harith Danish Irwan (red card) 90+4'	Stadium: Our Tampines Hub; Referee: Zulfiqar Mustaffa; Man of the Match: (Singapore) Izwan Mahbud

7 March 2026 14 (Rescheduled)	Lion City Sailors (Singapore)	4–0	(Singapore) Geylang International	Jalan Besar
	Toni Datković 27', 79'; Anderson Lopes 28' (yellow card) 68'; Shawal Anuar 71'	Report	Nikola Ignjatovic (yellow card) 45+2'; Nazrul Nazari (yellow card) 45+10'	Stadium: Jalan Besar Stadium; Referee: Mazlan Pagira; Man of the Match: (Croatia) Toni Datković

15 March 2026 15	Geylang International (Singapore)	1–0	(Japan) Albirex Niigata (S)	Tampines
	Shodai Yokoyama 73'; Shakir Hamzah (yellow card) 32'; Joshua Pereira (yellow card) 34'; Nazrul Nazari (yellow card) 90'	Report	Nicky Melvin Singh (yellow card) 90+2'; Naoki Yoshioka (yellow card) 90+6'	Stadium: Our Tampines Hub; Referee: Taufik Thana; Man of the Match: (North Korea) Ryang Hyon-ju

4 April 2026 16	Hougang United (Singapore)	0–1	(Singapore) Geylang International	Bishan
	Víctor Blasco (yellow card) 25'; Washington Jaramillo (yellow card) 45+5'		Ryoya Taniguchi 5'; Kim Tae-ho (yellow card) 90+3'	Stadium: Bishan Stadium; Referee: Jansen Foo; Man of the Match: (Japan) Shuhei Hoshino

11 April 2026 17	BG Tampines Rovers (Singapore)	4–3	(Singapore) Geylang International	Tampines
	Hide Higashikawa 5', 12', 90+7'; Jacob Mahler 90+5'; Yuki Kobayashi (yellow card) 79'	Report	Kaisei Ogawa 21'; Shodai Yokoyama 29'; Shuhei Hoshino 47'; Shahdan Sulaiman (yellow card) 75'; Rudy Khairullah (yellow card) 90+3'	Stadium: Our Tampines Hub; Referee: Mazlan Pagira; Man of the Match: (Japan) Hide Higashikawa

19 April 2026 18	Geylang International (Singapore)	2–1	(Singapore) Tanjong Pagar United	Tampines
	Riku Fukashiro 33'; Ryoya Taniguchi 83'; Nazrul Nazari (yellow card) 21'; Shuhei Hoshino (yellow card) 87'	Report	Junior Djile 27'; Kim Li-Kwan (yellow card) 9'; Vabio Canavaro (yellow card) 57'; Syahrul Sazali (yellow card) 70'; Raihan Rahman (yellow card) 89'	Stadium: Our Tampines Hub; Referee: Thawfeek Ahamad; Man of the Match: (Japan) Riku Fukashiro

26 April 2026 19	Geylang International (Singapore)	0–3	(Singapore) Lion City Sailors	Tampines
	Shahdan Sulaiman (red card) 66'	Report	Anderson Lopes 36'; Rui Pires 46'; Lennart Thy 67' (pen.); Hami Syahin (yellow card) 90+4'	Stadium: Our Tampines Hub; Referee: Zulfiqar Mustaffa; Man of the Match: (Singapore) Lionel Tan

2 May 2026 20 (Rescheduled)	Geylang International (Singapore)	2–3	(Singapore) Balestier Khalsa	Tampines
	Ryoya Tanigushi 45+2' (yellow card) 36' (red card) 90+5'; Shuhei Hoshino 84'; Vincent Bezecourt (yellow card) 88'		Jakov Katuša 22' (yellow card) 90+6'; Daniel Goh 38'; Elijah Lim 90+1'; Tajeli Salamat (yellow card) 41' (yellow-red card) 90+5'	Stadium: Our Tampines Hub; Referee: Hilmi Fuad; Man of the Match: (Croatia) Jakov Katuša

9 May 2026 21 (Rescheduled)	Young Lions (Singapore)	2–2	(Singapore) Geylang International	Jalan Besar
	Sergio Mendonça 39' (yellow card) 52'; Louka Tan-Vaissiere 90+8'; Andrew Aw (yellow card) 90+1'; Nicolas Michael Beninger (yellow card) 90+10'		Kim Tae-ho 33', 90+6'	Stadium: Jalan Besar Stadium; Referee: Oswind Suriya; Man of the Match: (Singapore) Amir Syafiz

Pos	Team	Pld	W	D	L	GF	GA	GD	Pts	Qualification or relegation
1	Lion City Sailors (C)	21	16	3	2	70	14	+56	51	Qualification for Champions League Two group stage (Note: Since the winners of the 2025–26 Singapore Cup, Lion City Sailors, qualified for the Champions League Two by league position, the spot reserved for the Singapore Cup winners will pass to the runners-up of the league.)
2	BG Tampines Rovers	21	15	4	2	58	21	+37	49	Qualification for Champions League Two group stage
3	Albirex Niigata (S)	21	15	2	4	47	19	+28	47	
4	Balestier Khalsa	21	11	2	8	44	46	−2	35	
5	Geylang International	21	7	3	11	29	42	−13	24	
6	Hougang United	21	7	0	14	24	41	−17	21	
7	Young Lions (Note: Young Lions cannot qualify for AFC competitions.)	21	2	3	16	15	58	−43	9	
8	Tanjong Pagar United	21	2	1	18	17	63	−46	7	

Updated to match(es) played on 18 May 2026. Source: Singapore Premier League
Rules for classification: 1) points; 2) goal difference; 3) number of goals scored; 4) number of wins
(C) Champions

=== Singapore Cup ===
==== Round 1 ====
1 November 2025 Rd 1 Match 1	Geylang International (Singapore)	0–3	(Japan) Albirex Niigata (S)	Tampines
	Nikola Ignjatovic (yellow card) 20'; Shakir Hamzah (red card) 23'		Shingo Nakano 26' (pen.), 83', 90+9' (yellow card) 89'; Sim Jun Yen (yellow card) 17'	Stadium: Our Tampines Hub; Referee: Jansen Foo; Man of the Match: (Japan) Shingo Nakano

22 November 2025 Rd 1 Match 2	Hougang United (Singapore)	3–0	(Singapore) Geylang International	Tampines
	Nabilai Kibunguchy 69' (yellow card) 90+8'; Farhan Zulkifli 73'; Chonlawit Kanuengkid 77'; Víctor Blasco (yellow card) 17'; Huzaifah Aziz (yellow card) 88'		Gareth Low (yellow card) 85'	Stadium: Our Tampines Hub; Referee: Taufik Thana; Man of the Match: (Singapore) Farhan Zulkifli

30 November 2025 Rd 1 Match 3	Geylang International (Singapore)	3–3	(Singapore) Balestier Khalsa	Tampines
	Riku Fukashiro 83' (yellow card) 64'; Vincent Bezecourt 88' (penalty missed) 68; Ryoya Taniguchi 90+5'; Nizwan Izzairie (yellow card) 1' (yellow-red card) 20'; Nazrul Nazari (yellow card) 43'		Tin Matić 14', 22' (yellow card) 34'; Lazar Vujanic 90+2' (yellow card) 56'; Mario Šubarić (yellow card) 63'; Harith Kanadi (yellow card) 66'	Stadium: Our Tampines Hub; Referee: Ahmad A'Qashah; Man of the Match: (Croatia) Tin Matic

6 December 2025 Rd 1 Match 4	Tanjong Pagar United (Singapore)	1–4	(Singapore) Geylang International	Jurong East
	Faizal Roslan (red card) 26'; Raihan Rahman (yellow card) 29'; Aaron Evans (yellow card) 75'; Youssef Ezzejjari 70' (pen.) (yellow card) 90+1'		Shuhei Hoshino 5', 58'; Riku Fukashiro 15'; Vincent Bezecourt 38'; Shahdan Sulaiman (penalty missed) 28; Ryoya Taniguchi (yellow card) 90+2'	Stadium: Jurong East Stadium; Referee: Clarence Leow; Man of the Match: (France) Vincent Bezecourt

== Competition (Women) ==
=== 2025 Women's Premier League ===
Win Draw Loss

9 March 2025 1	Hougang United (Singapore)	1–1	(Singapore) Geylang International	Choa Chu Kang
	Sydney Hector 74'		Farah Nurzahirah 17'	Stadium: Choa Chu Kang Stadium

23 March 2025 2	Geylang International (Singapore)	1–3	(Singapore) Albirex Niigata (S)	Choa Chu Kang
	Farah Nurzahirah 26'		Manami Fukuzawa 24'; Vanessa Han 31'; Nurzaherra Maisarah 53'	Stadium: Choa Chu Kang Stadium

13 April 2025 3	Geylang International (Singapore)	1–4	(Singapore) Still Aerion WFC	Choa Chu Kang
	Farah Nurzahirah 52' (pen.)		Puteri Alisa Wilkinson 11'; Sunisa Srangthaisong 24'; Noralinda 60'; Nurul Unaisah 90'	Stadium: Choa Chu Kang Stadium

16 April 2025 4	Balestier Khalsa (Singapore)	1–8	(Singapore) Geylang International	Choa Chu Kang
	Sharifah Amanina 90+5'		Farah Nurzahirah 2' 11' 18' 25' 31'; Victoria Novoselov 45'; Hamizah Talib 56' (pen.); Farhanah Ruhaizat 61'	Stadium: Choa Chu Kang Stadium

6 August 2025 5 (Rescheduled)	Geylang International (Singapore)	3–0	(Singapore) BG Tampines Rovers	Choa Chu Kang
	Elyssa Qistina 25'; Nasriah Ibrahim 70'; Olliana Davies 75'			Stadium: Choa Chu Kang Stadium

Match is postponed due to the unavailability of the stadium as a result of the 2025 General Election

3 August 2025 6 (Rescheduled)	Tiong Bahru FC (Singapore)	1–5	(Singapore) Geylang International	Choa Chu Kang
	Lee Kai Kuan 2'		Nasriah Ibrahim 8'; Elyssa Qistina 34'; Saranya Thiru 45+1'; Farhanah Ruhaizat 51'; Nadhra Aqilah 83'	Stadium: Choa Chu Kang Stadium

Match is postponed due to the unavailability of the stadium as a result of the 2025 General Election

10 May 2025 7	Lion City Sailors (Singapore)	8–0	(Singapore) Geylang International	Choa Chu Kang
	Nurhidayu Naszri 16'; Raeka Ee Pei Ying 20', 43', 53', 81'; Priscille Le Helloco 32'; Sarah Zu’risqha Zul’kepli 47', 56'			Stadium: Choa Chu Kang Stadium

18 May 2025 8	Geylang International (Singapore)	6–0	(Singapore) Hougang United	Choa Chu Kang
	Farhanah Ruhaizat 7'; Farah Nurzahirah 22' 45' 49'; Kyra Taylor 34'; Svea Nadia Hertzman 90'			Stadium: Choa Chu Kang Stadium

25 May 2025 9	Albirex Niigata (S) (Singapore)	1–0	(Singapore) Geylang International	Choa Chu Kang
	Kana Kitahara			Stadium: Choa Chu Kang Stadium

17 August 2025 10	Geylang International (Singapore)	5–0	(Singapore) Balestier Khalsa	Choa Chu Kang
	Chloe Koh Ke Ying 38', 63', 66', 73'; Lauren Reese 54'			Stadium: Choa Chu Kang Stadium

23 August 2025 11	Geylang International (Singapore)	2–0	(Singapore) Tanjong Pagar United	Choa Chu Kang
	Farah Nurzahirah; Crystal Wu (o.g.)			Stadium: Choa Chu Kang Stadium

30 August 2025 12	Tanjong Pagar United (Singapore)	1–3	(Singapore) Geylang International	Choa Chu Kang
	Nuriah Noor 14'		Nasriah Ibrahim 6'; Alysha Nasrina 54'; Svea Nadia Hertzman 76'	Stadium: Choa Chu Kang Stadium

7 September 2025 13	Still Aerion (Singapore)	3–0	(Singapore) Geylang International	Choa Chu Kang
				Stadium: Choa Chu Kang Stadium

20 September 2025 14	BG Tampines Rovers (Singapore)	0–1	(Singapore) Geylang International	Choa Chu Kang
			Nasriah Ibrahim	Stadium: Choa Chu Kang Stadium

27 September 2025 15	Geylang International (Singapore)	3–0	(Singapore) Tiong Bahru FC	Choa Chu Kang
	Farhanah Ruhaizat 37'; Olliana Davies 66'; Nasriah Ibrahim 69'			Stadium: Choa Chu Kang Stadium

4 October 2025 16	Geylang International (Singapore)	1–1	(Singapore) Lion City Sailors	Choa Chu Kang
	Farhanah Ruhaizat 87'		Dhaniyah Qasimah 84'	Stadium: Choa Chu Kang Stadium

League table

Pos	Team	Pld	W	D	L	GF	GA	GD	Pts	Qualification or relegation
1	Albirex Niigata (S) (C)	16	15	0	1	91	6	+85	45	Qualification for AFC Champions League
2	Still Aerion	16	12	2	2	57	21	+36	38	
3	Lion City Sailors	16	11	3	2	76	10	+66	36	
4	Geylang International	16	9	2	5	40	23	+17	29	
5	Hougang United	16	6	2	8	17	28	−11	20	
6	Tanjong Pagar United	16	4	0	12	11	43	−32	12	
7	Tiong Bahru	16	4	0	12	13	47	−34	12	
8	BG Tampines Rovers	16	3	2	11	17	57	−40	11	
9	Balestier Khalsa	16	2	1	13	11	98	−87	7	

Updated to match(es) played on 12 Oct 2025. Source: Women's Premier League
Rules for classification: 1) points; 2) goal difference; 3) number of goals scored; 4) number of wins
(C) League champions

=== 2026 Women's Premier League ===
Win Draw Loss

25 January 2026 1	Still Aerion WFC (Singapore)	3–1	(Singapore) Geylang International	Bukit Gombak
	Anna Seng 24'; Bernice Lim 78'; Pikul Khueanpet 80'		Saranya Thiru 1'	Stadium: Bukit Gombak Stadium

1 February 2026 2	Geylang International (Singapore)	4–1	(Singapore) Tanjong Pagar United	Choa Chu Kang
	Lily Clayton 2'; Naureen Qadriyah 28', 60'; Rochelle Chan 81'		Nur Syakirah 32'	Stadium: Choa Chu Kang Stadium

6 February 2026 3	BG Tampines Rovers (Singapore)	1–4	(Singapore) Geylang International	Choa Chu Kang
	Victoria Hudson 78'		Naureen Qadriyah 25', 63'; Lily Clayton 42'; Fitrizah Fitri 54' (o.g.)	Stadium: Choa Chu Kang Stadium

20 February 2026 4	Geylang International (Singapore)	0–6	(Singapore) Lion City Sailors	Choa Chu Kang
			Ami Takeuchi 26', 72', 89'; Nur Ain Salleh 36'; Eri Kitagawa 49'; Farah Nurzahirah 71'	Stadium: Choa Chu Kang Stadium

March 2026 5	Albirex Jurong (Singapore)	–	(Singapore) Geylang International	Stadium

15 March 2026 6	Geylang International (Singapore)	–	(Singapore) Tiong Bahru	Choa Chu Kang
				Stadium: Choa Chu Kang Stadium

28 March 2026 7	Hougang United (Singapore)	–	(Singapore) Geylang International	Choa Chu Kang
				Stadium: Choa Chu Kang Stadium

5 April 2026 8	Geylang International (Singapore)	–	(Singapore) Balestier Khalsa	Choa Chu Kang
				Stadium: Choa Chu Kang Stadium

April 2026 9	Geylang International (Singapore)	–	(Singapore) Still Aerion WFC	Choa Chu Kang
				Stadium: Choa Chu Kang Stadium

24 April 2026 10	Tanjong Pagar United (Singapore)	–	(Singapore) Geylang International	Choa Chu Kang
				Stadium: Choa Chu Kang Stadium

1 May 2026 11	Geylang International (Singapore)	–	(Singapore) BG Tampines Rovers	Choa Chu Kang
				Stadium: Choa Chu Kang Stadium

15 May 2026 12	Lion City Sailors (Singapore)	–	(Singapore) Geylang International	Choa Chu Kang
				Stadium: Choa Chu Kang Stadium

23 May 2026 13	Geylang International (Singapore)	–	(Singapore) Albirex Jurong	Choa Chu Kang
				Stadium: Choa Chu Kang Stadium

13 June 2026 14	Tiong Bahru (Singapore)	–	(Singapore) Geylang International	Choa Chu Kang
				Stadium: Choa Chu Kang Stadium

20 June 2026 15	Geylang International (Singapore)	–	(Singapore) Hougang United	Bukit Gombak
				Stadium: Bukit Gombak Stadium

June 2026 16	Balestier Khalsa (Singapore)	–	(Singapore) Geylang International	Stadium

League table

Pos	Team	Pld	W	D	L	GF	GA	GD	Pts	Qualification or relegation
1	Lion City Sailors (C)	16	15	0	1	166	4	+162	45	Qualification for AFC Champions League
2	Albirex Jurong	16	15	0	1	140	6	+134	45	
3	Still Aerion	16	11	1	4	52	27	+25	34	
4	Geylang International	16	10	1	5	44	28	+16	31	
5	BG Tampines Rovers	16	7	1	8	30	58	−28	22	
6	Tanjong Pagar United	16	3	3	10	8	75	−67	12	
7	Balestier Khalsa	16	4	0	12	19	107	−88	12	
8	Tiong Bahru (R)	16	1	2	13	16	64	−48	5	Play-off with WNL runners-up
9	Hougang United (R)	16	1	2	13	9	115	−106	5	Relegation to National League

Source: Women's Premier League
Rules for classification: 1) points; 2) goal difference; 3) number of goals scored; 4) number of wins
(C) League champions; (R) Relegated
