= 2023 Geylang International FC season =

Geylang International
2023 season
- Chairman: Thomas Gay
- Head coach: Mohd Noor Ali
- Stadium: Our Tampines Hub, Tampines
- Singapore Premier League: 5th
- Singapore Cup: on progress
- Top goalscorer: League: Yushi Yamaya (10 goals); All: Yushi Yamaya (11 goals)
Home colours	Away colours

The 2023 season was Geylang International's 28th consecutive season in the top flight of Singapore football and in the Singapore Premier League. Along with the Singapore Premier League, the club also competed in the Singapore Cup.

== Squad ==
=== Singapore Premier League ===
No.	Name	Nationality	Date of birth (age)	Previous club	Contract since	Contract end
Goalkeepers
1	Ridhwan Fikri	(Singapore)	29 April 1999 (age 27)	(Singapore) Young Lions FC	2023	2023
21	Hafiz Ahmad	(Singapore)	30 December 1998 (age 27)	(Singapore) Project Vaults FC	2022	2023
24	Rudy Khairullah	(Singapore)	19 July 1994 (age 32)	(Singapore) Lion City Sailors	2023	2023
Defenders
2	Fadli Kamis ^{O30}	(Singapore)	7 November 1992 (age 33)	(Singapore) Balestier Khalsa	2022	2023
3	Faisal Shahril	(Singapore)	7 May 1997 (age 29)	(Canada) Vancouver United	2023	2023
5	Amirul Adli	(Singapore)	13 January 1996 (age 30)	(Singapore) Lion City Sailors	2023	2023
8	Joshua Pereira	(Singapore)	10 October 1997 (age 28)	(Singapore) SAFSA	2020	2023
9	Rio Sakuma	(Japan)	14 April 1997 (age 29)	(Cambodia) Tiffy Army FC	2022	2023
14	Ahmad Syahir ^{O30}	(Singapore)	10 April 1992 (age 34)	(Singapore) Balestier Khalsa	2022	2023
15	Nazhiim Harman	(Singapore)	2 March 1999 (age 27)	(Singapore) Hougang United	2023	2023
19	Akmal Azman ^{U23}	(Singapore)	21 November 2000 (age 25)	(Singapore) Balestier Khalsa	2023	2023
22	Danish Irfan	(Singapore)	10 March 1999 (age 27)	(Singapore) Tampines Rovers	2023	2023
Midfielders
4	Takahiro Tezuka	(Japan)	25 June 1998 (age 28)	(Japan) Albirex Niigata (S)	2022	2023
6	Gareth Low	(Singapore)	28 February 1997 (age 29)	(Singapore) Balestier Khalsa	2023	2023
10	Vincent Bezecourt	(France)	10 June 1993 (age 33)	(Armenia) FC Alashkert	2022	2023
11	Huzaifah Aziz	(Singapore)	27 June 1994 (age 32)	(Singapore) Tampines Rovers	2022	2023
17	Noor Ariff	(Singapore)	6 September 1998 (age 28)	(Singapore) Police SA	2017	2023
27	Arshad Shamim	(Singapore)	9 December 1999 (age 26)	(Singapore) Lion City Sailors	2023	2023
Forwards
7	Naufal Azman	(Singapore)	10 July 1998 (age 28)	(Singapore) Balestier Khalsa	2023	2023
16	Iqbal Hussain	(Singapore)	6 June 1993 (age 33)	(Singapore) Balestier Khalsa	2023	2023
20	Yushi Yamaya	(Japan)	11 June 2000 (age 26)	(Japan) Yokohama FC	2023	2023
26	Shahfiq Ghani ^{O30}	(Singapore)	17 March 1992 (age 34)	(Singapore) Hougang United	2023	2023
Players who left during season
13	Indra Putra Dyaja ^{U23}	(Singapore)	11 July 2001 (age 25)	(Singapore) Jungfrau Punggol FC	2023	2023
23	Delwinder Singh ^{O30}	(Singapore)	5 August 1992 (age 34)	(Singapore) Balestier Khalsa	2023	2023
Players on NS / loaned out
	Nur Luqman	(Singapore)	20 June 1998 (age 28)	(Singapore) Young Lions FC	2020	2021
	Zikos Vasileios Chua ^{U21}	(Singapore)	15 April 2002 (age 24)	(Singapore) NFA U16	2018	2021
	Ilhan Noor ^{U23}	(Singapore)	19 December 2002 (age 23)	Youth Team	2019	2022
	Kieran Teo Jia Jun ^{U23}	(Singapore)	6 April 2004 (age 22)	(Singapore) Lion City Sailors U21	2021	2022

=== Women ===
No.	Name	Nationality	Date of birth (age)	Previous club	Contract since	Contract end
Goalkeepers
1	Nathalia Murillo Rengifo	(Colombia)		(Singapore) Yale-NUS	2023	2023
25	Vernita Erat	(Singapore)		(Singapore) Warriors FC (W)	2023	2023
Defenders
3	Nurul Afiqah Azmi	(Singapore)		(Singapore)	2023	2023
13	Hushwariya	(Singapore)		(Singapore)	2023	2023
15	K.Harini	(Singapore)	20 July 2004 (age 22)	(Singapore) Bowen Secondary School	2023	2023
19	Shankari Dhoraraj	(Singapore)		(Singapore)	2023	2023
69	Bisesh Gurung	(Singapore)		(Singapore)	2023	2023
Midfielders
5	Noridah Abdullah	(Singapore)	20 December 1986 (age 39)	(Japan) Albirex Niigata (S)	2023	2023
6	Nur Shaahidah Zulkifli	(Singapore)	31 May 1999 (age 27)	(Japan) Albirex Niigata (S)	2023	2023
10	Siti Nor Aqilah	(Singapore)	17 October 2001 (age 24)	(Singapore) Tampines Changkat CSC	2023	2023
11	Neo Yan Ping	(Singapore)		(Singapore) SUSS	2023	2023
12	Erryn Alyssa	(Singapore)		(Singapore) JSSL FC (W)	2022	2022
14	Rauhdah Ramli	(Singapore)		(Singapore)	2023	2023
16	Siti Fardiana Nahar	(Singapore)		(Singapore) SUSS	2023	2023
17	Laura Tatiana Zamri	(Singapore)		(Singapore)	2023	2023
18	Puah Jing Wen	(Singapore)		(Singapore)	2023	2023
20	Fitri Azalea	(Singapore)		(Singapore) Simei United	2023	2023
21	Nadya Zah	(Singapore)	31 December 1985 (age 40)	(Japan) Albirex Niigata (S)	2023	2023
23	Afifah Umairah	(Singapore)		(Singapore)	2023	2023
24	Zakirah Saniah	(Singapore)		(Singapore)	2023	2023
27	Summer Chong	(Singapore)	18 December 2004 (age 21)	(United States) High Mowing School	2023	2023
Strikers
7	Charlotte Chong	(Singapore)	3 January 2007 (age 19)	(Singapore) Mattar Sailors (W)	2023	2023
8	Nellie Teo Sim May	(Singapore)		(Singapore)	2023	2023
9	Sitti Shahirah	(Singapore)	22 November 2002 (age 23)	(Singapore) Warriors FC (W)	2023	2023
22	Olesia Sheremeta	(Ukraine)		(Singapore) Yale-NUS	2023	2023
Players left during the season
4	Yasmine Zaharin	(Singapore)	19 March 2007 (age 19)	(Singapore) Bussorah Youths SC	2023	2023

== Coaching staff ==
First Team

Position	Name	Ref.
Chairman	(Singapore) Thomas Gay	
Vice-Chairman	(China) Shi Kan	
General manager	(Singapore) Khair Rizauddin	
General manager (Deputy) & Team Manager	(Singapore) Leonard Koh	
Head coach	(Singapore) Mohd Noor Ali	(Note: 2 years contract till 2024)
Assistant Coach	(Singapore) Syed Azmir	
Goalkeeping Coach	(Singapore) Yusri Aziz	
Fitness Coach	(Singapore) Sofiyan Abdul Hamid	
Physiotherapist	(Singapore)	
Sports Trainer	(Singapore) Fazly Hasan	
Kitman	(Singapore)	
Sports Scientist		

U21 and Women Team

Position	Name	Ref.
Team Manager (Women)	(Singapore) Nurjannah Jamalludin	
Head Coach (Women)	(Singapore) Mohamed Hanafiah	
Head of Youth	(Singapore) Aidil Sulaiman	
Centre of Excellence & U21 Coach		
U17 Coach	(Singapore) Azlan Alipah	
U15 Coach	(Singapore) Nor Azli Yusoff	
Youth Goalkeeping Coach	(Singapore) Rezal Hassan	

== Transfers ==
=== In ===
Pre-season

Position	Player	Transferred From	Team	Ref
GK	(Singapore) Ridhwan Fikri	(Singapore) Young Lions FC	First team	Free
GK	(Singapore) Dylan Christopher Goh	(Singapore) Lion City Sailors U21	U21	Free (Note: Dylan left the club for SCC before mid-season.)
DF	(Singapore) Amirul Adli	(Singapore) Lion City Sailors	First Team	Free
DF	(Singapore) Faisal Shahrin	(Canada) Vancouver United	First Team	Free
DF	(Singapore) Indra Putra Dyaja	(Singapore) Jungfrau Punggol	First Team	Free (Note: Indra left the club for SCC before mid-season.)
DF	(Singapore) Nazhiim Harman	(Singapore) Hougang United	First team	Free
DF	(Singapore) Akmal Azman	(Singapore) Balestier Khalsa	First team	Free
DF	(Singapore) Delwinder Singh	(Singapore) Balestier Khalsa	First Team	Free (Note: Delwinder left the club for Angkor Tiger after his short-term contract end.)
DF	(Singapore) Ian Faris Shahrin	(Singapore) Lion City Sailors U21	U21	Free
MF	(Singapore) Naufal Azman	(Singapore) Balestier Khalsa	First team	Free
MF	(Singapore) Gareth Low	(Singapore) Balestier Khalsa	First team	Free
MF	(Singapore) Muthukumaran Navaretthinam	(Singapore) Tanjong Pagar United U21	U21	Free
MF	(Singapore) Dylan Chia	(Singapore) Tanjong Pagar United U21	U21	Free
MF	(Singapore) Ouzkaan Poyraz	(Singapore) Tanjong Pagar United U21	U21	Free
FW	(Japan) Yushi Yamaya	(Japan) Yokohama F. Marinos	First team	Free
FW	(Singapore) Shahfiq Ghani	(Singapore) Hougang United	First Team	Free
FW	(Singapore) Iqbal Hussain	–	First team	Free
FW	(Singapore) Sham Mohamed	(Singapore) Lion City Sailors U21	U21	Free

Pre-season

Position	Player	Transferred From	Team	Ref
MF	(Singapore) Kayden Neo	(Singapore) Tampines Rovers U17	U21	Free
FW	(Singapore) Syazwan Latiff	(Singapore) Tampines Rovers U21	U21	Free

=== Loan In ===
Mid-season

Position	Player	Transferred From	Team	Ref
DF	(Singapore) Danish Irfan	(Singapore) Tampines Rovers	First Team	Season loan
GK	(Singapore) Rudy Khairullah	(Singapore) Lion City Sailors	First Team	Season loan
DF	(Singapore) Arshad Shamim	(Singapore) Lion City Sailors	First Team	Season loan

=== Loan Return ===
Mid-season

Position	Player	Transferred from	Team	Ref
GK	(Singapore) Wayne Chew	(Singapore) SAFSA	First Team	End of NS (Note: Wayne Chew joined Balestier after his loan to Young Lions ended.)
DF	(Singapore) Harith Kanadi	(Singapore) SAFSA	First Team	End of NS (Note: Harith Kanadi joined LCS after his loan to Young Lions ended.)

=== Out ===
Pre-season

Position	Player	Transferred To	Team	Ref
GK	(Singapore) Zaiful Nizam	(Singapore) Hougang United	First Team	Free (Note: Zaiful didn't exercise his contract option for 2023)
GK	(Singapore) Zulfairuuz Rudy	Retired	First Team	N.A.
DF	(Singapore) Qayyum Raishyan	Retired	First Team	Free
DF	(Singapore) Abdil Qaiyyim Mutalib	(Singapore) Hougang United	First Team	Free
DF	(Singapore) Faizal Roslan	(Singapore) Tanjong Pagar United	First Team	Free
DF	(Singapore) Nasrul Pujiyono	(Singapore) Hougang United U21	U21	Free
MF	(Singapore) Khairul Hairie	(Singapore) Tanjong Pagar United	First Team	Free
MF	(Singapore) Umar Ramle	(Singapore) Hougang United	First Team	Free
MF	(Singapore) Ariffin Noor	Retired	U21	Free
MF	(Singapore) Robbi Alhambra	(Singapore) South Avenue SC (SFL2)	U21	Free
FW	(Singapore) Hazzuwan Halim	(Singapore) Hougang United	First Team	Free
FW	(Croatia) Šime Žužul	(Uzbekistan) Lokomotiv Tashkent (U2)	First Team	Free (Note: Zužul went for trial with Dong A Thanh Hoa before moving to Lokomotiv Tashkent.)
FW	(Singapore) Fareez Farhan	(Singapore) SKA (SFL1)	First Team	Free
DF	(Singapore) Tajeli Salamat	(Singapore) Lion City Sailors	First Team	Loan Return (Note: Tajeli returns to LCS before making the move to Tanjong Pagar United)

Mid-season

Position	Player	Transferred To	Team	Ref
GK	(Singapore) Dylan Christopher Goh	Singapore Cricket Club (SFL1)	U21	Free
DF	(Singapore) Indra Putra Dyaja	Singapore Cricket Club (SFL1)	First Team	Free
DF	(Singapore) Delwinder Singh	(Cambodia) Angkor Tiger FC	First Team	
FW	(Singapore) Danish Siregar	Singapore Cricket Club (SFL1)	U21	Free
GK	(Singapore) Wayne Chew	(Singapore) Balestier Khalsa	First Team	Free
DF	(Singapore) Harith Kanadi	(Singapore) Lion City Sailors	First Team	Free
DF	(Singapore) Yasmine Zaharin	(United States) IMG Academy	Women	Free
MF	(Singapore) Elijah Lim Teck Yong	(Singapore) Balestier Khalsa	First Team	Free
MF	(Singapore) Muthukumaran Navaretthinam	(Singapore) SAFSA	U21	Enlisted
DF	(Singapore) Syady Sufwan	(Singapore) SAFSA	U21	Enlisted

=== Loan Out ===
Pre-season

Position	Player	Transferred To	Team	Ref
FW	(Singapore) Zikos Vasileios Chua	(Singapore) SAFSA	First Team	NS till May 2023 (Note: Zikos Vasileios Chua loan to Young Lions extended till end of season.)
GK	(Singapore) Wayne Chew	(Singapore) SAFSA	First Team	NS till October 2023 (Note: Wayne Chew joined Balestier after his loan to Young Lions ended.)
DF	(Singapore) Harith Kanadi	(Singapore) SAFSA	First Team	NS till October 2023 (Note: Harith Kanadi joined LCS after his loan to Young Lions ended.)
MF	(Singapore) Elijah Lim Teck Yong	(Singapore) SAFSA	First Team	NS till October 2023 (Note: Elijah Lim joined Balestier after his loan to Young Lions ended.)
MF	(Singapore) Nur Luqman	(Singapore) SAFSA	First Team	NS till October 2023
DF	(Singapore) Ilhan Noor	(Singapore) SAFSA	First Team	NS till January 2025
DF	(Singapore) Kieran Teo Jia Jun	(Singapore) SAFSA	U21	NS till January 2025

Mid-season

Position	Player	Transferred To	Team	Ref
MF	(Singapore) Joel Loh	(Singapore) SAFSA	U17	NS till September 2025

=== Extension / Retained ===
Position	Player	Ref
Coach	(Singapore) Mohd Noor Ali	2 years extension from 2023 till 2024
DF	(Singapore) Joshua Pereira	1 years contract from 2022 till 2023
DF	(Japan) Rio Sakuma	1 years contract from 2022 till 2023
MF	(Japan) Takahiro Tezuka	1 years contract from 2022 till 2023
MF	(France) Vincent Bezecourt	1 years contract from 2022 till 2023
GK	(Singapore) Hafiz Ahmad	1 year contract from 2022 till 2023
DF	(Singapore) Fadli Kamis	1 year contract from 2022 till 2023
DF	(Singapore) Ahmad Syahir	1 year contract from 2022 till 2023
MF	(Singapore) Huzaifah Aziz	1 year contract from 2022 till 2023
MF	(Singapore) Noor Ariff	1 year contract from 2022 till 2023

== Friendlies ==
=== Pre-season ===
Win Draw Loss

First Team

27 January 2023 1	Geylang International (Singapore)	7–0	Singapore Cricket Club	Tampines
	Yushi Yamaya			Stadium: Our Tampines Hub

17 February 2023 2	Geylang International (Singapore)	6–0	(Singapore) Bukit Timah FC	Tampines
				Stadium: Our Tampines Hub

2023 Malaysia Tour (31 January – 12 February)

1 February 2023 Harapan Cup Semi Final	Geylang International (Singapore)	0–4	(Malaysia) Penang FC	Penang
			Azmeer Aris 2'; Rafael Vitor 28' (pen.); Rahmat Makasuf 34'; Giovane Gomes 82'	Stadium: Penang State Stadium

4 February 2023 Harapan Cup Placement	Geylang International (Singapore)	1–2	(Malaysia) Kedah Darul Aman	Penang
	Vincent Bezecourt 40'		Zharmien Ashraf 31'; Al-Hafiz Harun 37'	Stadium: Penang State Stadium

8 February 2023 Friendly	Geylang International (Singapore)	cancelled	(Malaysia) Kuala Lumpur City FC	Kuala Lumpur
				Stadium: Kuala Lumpur Stadium

11 February 2023 Friendly	Geylang International (Singapore)	0–6	(Malaysia) Sabah FC	Kota Kinabalu
			Gabriel Peres 9'; Daniel Ting 13'; Darren Lok 62' (pen.); Saddil Ramdani 67'; Amri Yahyah 76' 90+1'	Stadium: Likas Stadium

U21

13 January 2023 1	Jungfrau Punggol (Singapore)	2–3	(Singapore) Geylang International	Tampines
				Stadium: Our Tampines Hub

20 March 2023 2	Singapore Khalsa Association	v	(Singapore) Geylang International	Tampines
				Stadium: Our Tampines Hub

=== In Season ===
First Team

27 April 2023 1	Geylang International (Singapore)	0–2	(Malaysia) Johor Darul Ta'zim III	Johor
				Stadium: Pasir Gudang Corporation Stadium

U17

6 November 2023 1	Geylang International (Singapore)	0–5	(Indonesia) Cibubur Youth Athlete SC	Tampines
				Stadium: Our Tampines Hub

11 November 2023 2	Geylang International (Singapore)	0–1	(Indonesia) Cibubur Youth Athlete SC	Tampines
				Stadium: Our Tampines Hub

== Team statistics ==
=== Appearances and goals ===
As of 26 Nov 2023

No.	Pos.	Player	SPL		Singapore Cup		Total	
No.	Pos.	Player	Apps.	Goals	Apps.	Goals	Apps.	Goals
1	GK	(Singapore) Ridhwan Fikri	1	0	1	0	1	0
2	DF	(Singapore) Fadli Kamis	13+4	0	1+3	0	21	0
3	DF	(Singapore) Faisal Shahrin	1+5	0	0	0	6	0
4	MF	(Japan) Takahiro Tezuka	24	1	4	2	28	3
5	DF	(Singapore) Amirul Adli	18	1	4	0	22	1
6	MF	(Singapore) Gareth Low	8+12	3	4	0	24	3
7	MF	(Singapore) Naufal Azman	11+9	5	2	1	22	6
8	DF	(Singapore) Joshua Pereira	21	2	4	0	25	2
9	DF	(Japan) Rio Sakuma	22	3	4	0	26	3
10	MF	(France) Vincent Bezecourt	16	7	0	0	16	7
11	MF	(Singapore) Huzaifah Aziz	10	0	0	0	10	0
14	DF	(Singapore) Ahmad Syahir	11	0	2+1	0	14	0
15	DF	(Singapore) Nazhiim Harman	0+5	0	0	0	5	0
16	FW	(Singapore) Iqbal Hussain	21+2	6	3	1	26	7
17	MF	(Singapore) Noor Ariff	0+6	0	0	0	6	0
19	DF	(Singapore) Akmal Azman	19	1	3	0	22	1
20	FW	(Japan) Yushi Yamaya	24	10	4	2	28	12
21	GK	(Singapore) Hafiz Ahmad	20	0	1	0	21	0
22	DF	(Singapore) Danish Irfan	2+2	0	1+1	0	5	0
24	GK	(Singapore) Rudy Khairullah	3	0	2	0	5	0
26	FW	(Singapore) Shahfiq Ghani	2+13	1	2	0	17	1
27	MF	(Singapore) Arshad Shamim	8+1	0	1+2	0	12	0
51	DF	(Singapore) Haikal Sukri	1	0	0	0	1	0
54	MF	(Singapore) Syady Sufwan	0+1	0	0	0	1	0
57	FW	(Singapore) Azri Suhaili	2+2	0	1	0	4	0
58	MF	(Singapore) Izz Anaqi	0+1	0	0	0	1	0
59	FW	(Singapore) Sham Mohamed	1+2	0	0	0	3	0
61	MF	(England) Zach Whitehouse	0+2	0	0+1	0	3	0
64	FW	(Singapore) (Greece) Christos Chua	0+1	0	0	0	1	0
70	FW	(Singapore) Danish Haziq	3+1	0	0	0	4	0
72	FW	(Singapore) Syazwan Latiff	0+2	0	0+1	0	3	0
Players who have played this season but had left the club or on loan to other club
13	DF	(Singapore) Indra Putra Dyaja	0	0	0	0	0	0
23	DF	(Singapore) Delwinder Singh	1+4	1	0	0	5	1
53	MF	(Singapore) Muthukumaran Navaretthinam	0+1	0	0	0	1	0

== Competitions (Men) ==
=== Overview ===
Competition	Record							
Competition	P	W	D	L	GF	GA	GD	Win %

Results summary (SPL)

Overall								Home						Away					
Pld	W	D	L	GF	GA	GD	Pts	W	D	L	GF	GA	GD	W	D	L	GF	GA	GD
20	9	3	8	34	37	−3	30	4	1	4	16	17	−1	5	2	4	18	20	−2

=== Singapore Premier League ===
Win Draw Loss

25 February 2023 1	Tampines Rovers (Singapore)	1–1	(Singapore) Geylang International	Tampines
	Faris Ramli 16'; Yasir Hanapi (yellow card) 37'; Irfan Najeeb (yellow card) 40'; Taufik Suparno (yellow card) 59'	Report	Vincent Bezecourt 2'; Joshua Pereira (yellow card) 17'; Amirul Adli (yellow card) 65'; Noor Ariff (yellow card) 78'	Stadium: Our Tampines Hub; Referee: Jansen Foo

28 February 2023 2	Geylang International (Singapore)	4–2	(Singapore) Young Lions FC	Tampines
	Yushi Yamaya 25' (pen.) (yellow card) 90+7'; Naufal Azman 56'; Rio Sakuma 63' 70'; Takahiro Tezuka (yellow card) 48'; Akmal Azman (red card) 78'; Joshua Pereira (yellow card) 90+1'	Report	Harith Kanadi 7'; Jun Kobayashi 52'; Elijah Lim Teck Yong (yellow card) 43'	Stadium: Our Tampines Hub; Referee: Clarence Leow

5 March 2023 3	Geylang International (Singapore)	2–1	(Singapore) Hougang United	Tampines
	Vincent Bezecourt 72' 85' (yellow card) 85'; Huzaifah Aziz (yellow card) 47'; Gareth Low (yellow card) 90'	Report	Sahil Suhaimi 16'; Irwan Shah (yellow card) 20'; Brian Ferreira (yellow card) 40'; Kazuma Takayama (yellow card) 90'	Stadium: Our Tampines Hub; Referee: Ahmad A'qashah

10 March 2023 4	Tanjong Pagar United (Singapore)	2–0	(Singapore) Geylang International	Jurong East
	Shakir Hamzah 19' (yellow card) 40'; Blake Ricciuto 48'; Tajeli Salamat (yellow card) 45+1'; Fathullah Rahmat (yellow card) 64'; Kenji Syed Rusydi (yellow card) 71'; Faizal Roslan (yellow card) 90+2'	Report		Stadium: Jurong East Stadium; Referee: Mohd Taqi

15 March 2023 5	Lion City Sailors (Singapore)	3–0	(Singapore) Geylang International	Bishan
	Hafiz Nor 22'; Diego Lopes 45+1' (penalty missed) 19; Abdul Rasaq 71'	Report	Huzaifah Aziz (yellow card) 39'; Joshua Pereira (yellow card) 82'	Stadium: Bishan Stadium; Referee: Andrea Verolino

19 March 2023 6	DPMM FC (Brunei)	1–3	(Singapore) Geylang International	Jalan Besar
	Abdul Azizi Ali Rahman 61'; Azwan Ali Rahman (yellow card) 33'; Abdul Mu'iz Sisa (yellow card) 53'	Report	Naufal Azman 5' (yellow card) 71'; Yushi Yamaya 55' (pen.) 66'; Akmal Azman (yellow card) 44'	Stadium: Jalan Besar Stadium (Note: DPMM stadium under renovation and not available); Referee: Mohd Taqi

1 April 2023 7	Geylang International (Singapore)	1–6	(Japan) Albirex Niigata (S)	Tampines
	Yushi Yamaya 18'; Joshua Pereira (yellow card) 62'	Report	Tadanari Lee 8'; Koki Kawachi 44'; Shuto Komaki 49'; Riku Fukashiro 55'; Keito Komatsu 57'; Seia Kunori 74'; Shunsaku Kishimoto (yellow card) 90'	Stadium: Our Tampines Hub; Referee: Clarence Leow

12 April 2023 8 (Rescheduled)	Geylang International (Singapore)	3–0	(Singapore) Balestier Khalsa	Jalan Besar
	Iqbal Hussain 32' (yellow card) 42'; Yushi Yamaya 40'; Gareth Low 77'; Sham Mohamed (yellow card) 19'; Fadli Kamis (yellow card) 34'; Gareth Low (yellow card) 52'	Report	Ho Wai Loon (yellow card) 51'	Stadium: Jalan Besar Stadium (Note: OTH not available due to unplayable field); Referee: Farhad Mohamed

7 May 2023 9	Geylang International (Singapore)	1–2	(Singapore) Lion City Sailors	Tampines
	Iqbal Hussain 10'; Huzaifah Aziz (yellow card) 45+2'; Ahmad Syahir (yellow card) 68'; Naufal Azman (yellow card) 70'; Vincent Bezecourt (yellow card) 85'	Report	Maxime Lestienne 69' 89'; Hami Syahin (yellow card) 19'; Zulqarnaen Suzliman (yellow card) 79'; Rusyaidi Salime (red card) 90+4' (yellow card) 86'	Stadium: Our Tampines Hub; Referee: Jansen Foo

12 May 2023 10	Hougang United (Singapore)	3–2	(Singapore) Geylang International	Jalan Besar
	Jordan Vestering 1'; Gabriel Quak 81' (pen.); Kristijan Krajcek 90+3'; Hazzuwan Halim (yellow card) 31' (yellow-red card) 84'; Sahil Suhaimi (yellow card) 90+3'	Report	Naufal Azman 45+3' 87'; Vincent Bezecourt (yellow card) 58'; Amirul Adli (yellow card) 90+4'	Stadium: Jalan Besar Stadium; Referee: Mohd Taqi

21 May 2023 11	Geylang International (Singapore)	2–3	(Singapore) Tanjong Pagar United	Tampines
	Vincent Bezecourt 45+4'; Delwinder Singh 72'; Joshua Pereira (yellow card) 18'	Report	Khairul Amri 10'; Mirko Šugić 45' (yellow card) 41'; Marin Mudražija 45+3' (yellow card) 80'; Akram Azman (yellow card) 38'; Shahrin Saberin (yellow card) 66'; Blake Ricciuto (yellow card) 69'; Zulfadhmi Suzliman (yellow card) 70'	Stadium: Our Tampines Hub; Referee: Syanqawi Buhari

27 May 2023 12	Young Lions FC (Singapore)	0–2	(Singapore) Geylang International	Jalan Besar
	Raoul Suhaimi (yellow card) 48'	Report	Iqbal Hussain 41'; Amirul Adli 70'; Gareth Low (yellow card) 62'	Stadium: Jalan Besar Stadium; Referee: Farhad Mohamed

6 June 2023 13	Albirex Niigata (S) (Japan)	3–0	(Singapore) Geylang International	Jurong East
	Shuto Komaki 21'; Seia Kunori 56'; Keito Komatsu 80'; Shunsaku Kishimoto (yellow card) 53' (yellow-red card) 86'; Asahi Yokokawa (yellow card) 79'	Report	Ahmad Syahir (yellow card) 40'; Iqbal Hussain (yellow card) 47'; Naufal Azman (yellow card) 81'; Fadli Kamis (yellow card) 90+3'	Stadium: Jurong East Stadium; Referee: Jansen Foo

23 June 2023 14	Balestier Khalsa (Singapore)	2–3	(Singapore) Geylang International	Bishan
	Ho Wai Loon 35' (yellow card) 44'; Masahiro Sugita 83'; Alen Kozar (yellow card) 30'; Fudhil I'yadh (yellow card) 76'	Report	Yushi Yamaya 47'; Vincent Bezecourt 55'; Shahfiq Ghani 79'; Danish Irfan (yellow card) 33' (yellow-red card) 61'	Stadium: Bishan Stadium; Referee: Syarqawi Buhari

28 June 2023 15	Geylang International (Singapore)	2–0	(Brunei) DPMM FC	Tampines
	Vincent Bezecourt 25'; Iqbal Hussain 51'; Yushi Yamaya (penalty missed) 58; Gareth Low (yellow card) 43'; Arshad Shamim (yellow card) 51'; Hafiz Ahmad (yellow card) 90+7'	Report	Kristijan Naumovski (yellow card) 17'; Farshad Noor (yellow card) 47'	Stadium: Our Tampines Hub; Referee: Hilmi Faud

2 July 2023 16	Geylang International (Singapore)	1–1	(Singapore) Tampines Rovers	Tampines
	Vincent Bezecourt 17'; Yushi Yamaya (yellow card) 90+3'	Report	Boris Kopitović 16'	Stadium: Our Tampines Hub; Referee: Taufik Thana

12 July 2023 17	Geylang International (Singapore)	0–2	(Singapore) Hougang United	Tampines
	Danish Irfan (yellow card) 41' (yellow-red card) 48'; Takahiro Tezuka (yellow card) 54'	Report	Kristijan Krajcek 45+4'; Gabriel Quak 87' (yellow card) 81'; Abdil Qaiyyim Mutalib (yellow card) 16'; Jordan Vestering (yellow card) 61'; Nazrul Nazari (yellow card) 84'	Stadium: Our Tampines Hub; Referee: Syarqawi Buhari; Man of the Match: Kristijan Krajcek

15 July 2023 18	Tanjong Pagar United (Singapore)	2–2	(Singapore) Geylang International	Jurong East
	Akram Azman 11'; Takahiro Tezuka 59'; Mirko Šugić (yellow card) 90+3'	Report	Yushi Yamaya 35'; Naqiuddin Eunos 89'; Rio Sakuma (yellow card) 45+2'; Akmal Azman (yellow card) 82'; Ahmad Syahir (yellow card) 89'; Syazwan Latiff (yellow card) 90+2'	Stadium: Jurong East Stadium; Referee: Farhad Mohamed

22 July 2023 19	Tampines Rovers (Singapore)	2–3	(Singapore) Geylang International	Tampines
	Yasir Hanapi 61' (pen.) 83'; Shuya Yamashita (yellow card) 18'; Irfan Najeeb (yellow card) 31' (red card) 51'	Report	Akmal Azman 35' (yellow card) 54'; Yushi Yamaya 53'; Rio Sakuma 90+7'; Iqbal Hussain (yellow card) 59'; Fadli Kamis (yellow card) 81'; Ahmad Syahir (yellow card) 90+1'; Amirul Adli (yellow card) 90+5'	Stadium: Our Tampines Hub; Referee: Ahmad A'qashah; Man of the Match: Joshua Pereira

28 July 2023 20 (Rescheduled)	DPMM FC (Brunei)	1–2	(Singapore) Geylang International	Jalan Besar
	Hakeme Yazid Said 84' (penalty missed) 35; Nazirrudin Ismail (yellow card) 85'	Report	Gareth Low 20'; Naufal Azman 48'; Amirul Adli (yellow card) 30' (yellow-red card) 90+2'; Arshad Shamim (yellow card) 73'	Stadium: Jalan Besar Stadium (Note: DPMM stadium under renovation and not available); Referee: Clarence Leow

3 August 2023 21	Geylang International (Singapore)	1–6	(Japan) Albirex Niigata (S)	Tampines
	Yushi Yamaya 83'	Report	Seia Kunori 40' 59' 79' 90+2'; Shuto Komaki 49'; Riku Fukashiro (yellow card) 77' (goal) 78'	Stadium: Our Tampines Hub; Referee: Taufik Thana

12 August 2023 22	Geylang International (Singapore)	2–6	(Singapore) Balestier Khalsa	Tampines
	Iqbal Hussain 22' 68'; Ahmad Syahir (red card) 64'; Syed Azmi (yellow card) 66'; Naufal Azman (red card) 73'	Report	Daniel Goh 4'; Shuhei Hoshino 29'; Joshua Pereira 45+2' (o.g.); Syukri Noorhaizam 75'; Masahiro Sugita 82'; Ryoya Tanigushi 86'	Stadium: Our Tampines Hub; Referee: Jansen Foo

19 August 2023 23	Geylang International (Singapore)	3–0	(Singapore) Young Lions FC	Tampines
	Joshua Pereira 40' 72'; Gareth Low 57'	Report	Jared Gallagher (yellow card) 70'; Ilhan Noor (yellow card) 83'	Stadium: Our Tampines Hub; Referee: Andrea Verolino; Man of the Match: Joshua Pereira

16 September 2023 24 (Rescheduled)	Lion City Sailors (Singapore)	3–1	(Singapore) Geylang International	Bishan
	Shawal Anuar 53'; Hami Syahin 62'; Haiqal Pashia 90+5'; Lionel Tan (red card) 71'	Report	Yushi Yamaya 31'; Hafiz Ahmad (yellow card) 45+1'	Stadium: Bishan Stadium; Referee: Farhad Mohamed

Pos	Team	Pld	W	D	L	GF	GA	GD	Pts	Qualification or relegation
1	Albirex Niigata (S) (Note: Three clubs – Albirex Niigata (S), DPMM FC and the FAS under-23 team Young Lions, are ineligible for any AFC competition spots.) (C)	24	20	2	2	86	20	+66	62	
2	Lion City Sailors (Q)	24	17	3	4	79	39	+40	54	Qualification for 2024-25 AFC Champions League Two Group Stage & ASEAN Club Championship
3	Tampines Rovers (Q)	24	14	6	4	47	32	+15	48	Qualification for 2024-25 AFC Champions League Two Group Stage
4	Balestier Khalsa	24	12	0	12	60	71	−11	36	
5	Geylang International	24	10	3	11	41	52	−11	33	
6	Hougang United	24	9	2	13	37	57	−20	29	
7	Brunei DPMM	24	6	5	13	39	43	−4	23	
8	Tanjong Pagar United	24	6	3	15	39	62	−23	21	
9	Young Lions	24	1	2	21	24	76	−52	5	

Source: Singapore Premier League
Rules for classification: 1) points; 2) goal difference; 3) number of goals scored; 4) number of wins
(C) Champions; (Q) Qualified for the phase indicated

=== Singapore Cup ===
Pos	Team	Pld	W	D	L	GF	GA	GD	Pts	Qualification
1	Brunei DPMM (Q)	4	3	1	0	7	2	+5	10	Semi-finals
2	Tampines Rovers (Q)	4	2	1	1	9	3	+6	7	Semi-finals
3	Albirex Niigata (S)	4	1	2	1	5	4	+1	5	
4	Geylang International	4	1	0	3	6	12	−6	3	
5	Young Lions	4	1	0	3	4	10	−6	3	

Updated to match(es) played on 29 September 2023. Source: FAS
(Q) Qualified for the phase indicated

Win Draw Loss

29 September 2023 Group Match 1	Albirex Niigata (S) (Japan)	1–2	(Singapore) Geylang International	Jurong East
	Shunsaku Kishimoto 74'	Report	Yushi Yamaya 45+1'; Naufal Azman 51'; Arshad Shamim (yellow card) 69'	Stadium: Jurong East Stadium; Referee: Syarqawi Buhari

22 October 2023 Group Match 2	Geylang International (Singapore)	1–4	Brunei DPMM	Tampines
	Iqbal Hussain 9' (pen.); Yushi Yamaya (yellow card) 62'; Naufal Azma (red card) 64'; Leonard Koh (yellow card) 65'	Report	Hakeme Yazid Said 23'; Farshad Noor 38'; Andrey Voronkov 43'; Hanif Farhan Azman 68'; Azwan Ali Rahman (yellow card) 62'	Stadium: Our Tampines Hub; Referee: Andrea Verolino

4 November 2023 Group Match 3	Tampines Rovers (Singapore)	3–1	(Singapore) Geylang International	Tampines
	Saifullah Akbar 34' (yellow card) 48'; Miloš Zlatković 49'; Joel Chew 57'; Shuya Yamashita (yellow card) 65'; Yasir Hanapi (red card) 68'; Faris Ramli (yellow card) 74'; Fahrudin Mustafić (yellow card) 84'	Report	Takahiro Tezuka 39'; Arshad Shamim (yellow card) 6'; Yushi Yamaya (yellow card) 90+4'	Stadium: Our Tampines Hub; Referee: Jansen Foo

26 November 2023 Group Match 4	Geylang International (Singapore)	2–4	(Singapore) Young Lions FC	Tampines
	Takahiro Tezuka 39'; Yushi Yamaya 43'; Ahmad Syahir (red card) 49'; Shahfiq Ghani (red card) 75'	Report	Kan Kobayashi 56'; Kieran Teo Jia Jun 59'; Jared Gallagher 90+1' (yellow card) 61'; Farhan Zulkifli 90+4'; Haziq Kamarudin (yellow card) 38'; Harhys Stewart (yellow card) 87'	Stadium: Our Tampines Hub; Referee: Taufik Thana

== Competition (Women) ==
=== Women's Premier League ===
Win Draw Loss

18 March 2023 1	Geylang International (Singapore)	0–8	(Singapore) JSSL Tampines	Choa Chu Kang
			Nur Azureen; Giselle Blumke; Nur Afiqah; Farhana Ruhaizat (pen.); Nahwah; Nahwah; Priscille Le Helloco	Stadium: Choa Chu Kang Stadium

26 March 2023 2	Geylang International (Singapore)	0–6	(Singapore) Tanjong Pagar United	Tampines
				Stadium: Our Tampines Hub

20 May 2023 3	Geylang International (Singapore)	0–6	(Japan) Albirex Niigata (S)	Choa Chu Kang
			Kana Kitahara 33', 62', 71', 86'; Tina Afrida Nasmi 36'; Nur Sarah Zu'risqha 37'	Stadium: Choa Chu Kang Stadium

28 May 2023 4	Geylang International (Singapore)	0–3	(Singapore) Balestier Khalsa	Choa Chu Kang
				Stadium: Choa Chu Kang Stadium

18 June 2023 5	Geylang International (Singapore)	1–2	(Singapore) Tiong Bahru FC	Choa Chu Kang
				Stadium: Choa Chu Kang Stadium

25 June 2023 6	Geylang International (Singapore)	0–5	(Singapore) Hougang United	Choa Chu Kang
				Stadium: Choa Chu Kang Stadium

22 July 2023 7	Geylang International (Singapore)	0–6	(Singapore) Lion City Sailors	Choa Chu Kang
			Miray Altun; Chloe Koh; Venetia Lim	Stadium: Choa Chu Kang Stadium

30 July 2023 8	Geylang International (Singapore)	1–4	(Singapore) Police SA	Choa Chu Kang
	Charlotte Chong 80'			Stadium: Choa Chu Kang Stadium

6 August 2023 9	Geylang International (Singapore)	3–2	(Singapore) Still Aerion	Choa Chu Kang
	Laura Tatiana Zamri; Charlotte Chong			Stadium: Choa Chu Kang Stadium

13 August 2023 10	Geylang International (Singapore)	1–0	(Singapore) JSSL Tampines	Yishun
	Noridah Abdullah			Stadium: Yishun Stadium

20 August 2023 11	Geylang International (Singapore)	0–3	(Singapore) Tanjong Pagar United	Choa Chu Kang
				Stadium: Choa Chu Kang Stadium

26 August 2023 12	Geylang International (Singapore)	0–11	(Japan) Albirex Niigata (S)	Choa Chu Kang
			Marina Asada 10', 36', 65'; Sierra Castles 14'; Nur Sarah Zu'risqha 47', 63'; Kana Kitahara 60'; Suriati Soony 81', 89'; 82' (o.g.); Noralinda Wahab 88'	Stadium: Choa Chu Kang Stadium

15 October 2023 13	Geylang International (Singapore)	0–12	(Singapore) Balestier Khalsa	Choa Chu Kang
				Stadium: Choa Chu Kang Stadium

22 October 2023 14	Geylang International (Singapore)	0–5	(Singapore) Hougang United	Choa Chu Kang
				Stadium: Choa Chu Kang Stadium

28 October 2023 15	Geylang International (Singapore)	1–2	(Singapore) Tiong Bahru FC	Choa Chu Kang
				Stadium: Choa Chu Kang Stadium

5 November 2023 16	Geylang International (Singapore)	0–11	(Singapore) Lion City Sailors	Clementi
			Julia-Vanessa Farr 12', 42'; Miray Altun 19', 70'; Josephine Ang Kaile 32', 47', 57'; Lila Tan 36'; Madelin Sophie Lock 57'; Nica Siy 69'; Ho Hui Xin 87'	Stadium: Clementi Stadium

19 November 2023 17	Geylang International (Singapore)	1–3	(Singapore) Police SA	Choa Chu Kang
				Stadium: Choa Chu Kang Stadium

26 November 2023 18	Geylang International (Singapore)	0–3	(Singapore) Still Aerion	Clementi
				Stadium: Clementi Stadium

League table

Pos	Team	Pld	W	D	L	GF	GA	GD	Pts	Qualification or relegation
1	Lion City Sailors	12	11	1	0	45	2	+43	34	League champions
2	(Japan) Albirex Niigata (S)	12	9	3	0	56	8	+48	30	
3	Hougang United	12	8	2	2	23	3	+20	26	
4	Police SA	12	6	4	2	21	12	+9	22	
5	Tanjong Pagar United	12	6	3	3	36	10	+26	21	
6	JSSL Tampines	12	3	1	8	19	24	−5	10	
7	Still Aerion	12	3	1	8	12	22	−10	10	
8	Balestier Khalsa	12	3	1	8	21	40	−19	10	
9	Geylang International	12	2	0	10	6	56	−50	6	
10	Tiong Bahru	12	1	0	11	7	69	−62	3	

Updated to match(es) played on 1 October 2022. Source: FAS
