= Naufal =

Naufal is an Indonesian masculine given name. Notable people with the name include:

- Naufal Azman (born 1998), Indonesian footballer
- Naufal Ilham (born 2002), Indonesian footballer
- Naufal Rahmanda (born 2000), Indonesian footballer
- Muhammad Naufal Zidan, Indonesian murder victim
