= 2022 Geylang International FC season =

Geylang International
2022 season
- Chairman: Thomas Gay
- Head coach: Mohd Noor Ali
- Stadium: Our Tampines Hub
Home colours	Away colours

The 2022 season was Geylang International's 27th consecutive season in the top flight of Singapore football and in the Singapore Premier League. Along with the Singapore Premier League, the club also competed in the Singapore Cup.

== Squad ==
=== Singapore Premier League ===
No.	Name	Nationality	Date of birth (age)	Previous club	Contract since	Contract end
Goalkeepers
1	Zulfairuuz Rudy	(Singapore)	22 May 1994 (age 32)	(Singapore) Tampines Rovers	2022	2022
19	Zaiful Nizam ^{>30}	(Singapore)	24 July 1987 (age 39)	(Singapore) Balestier Khalsa	2021	2023
21	Hafiz Ahmad	(Singapore)	30 December 1998 (age 27)	(Singapore) Project Vaults FC	2022	2022
Defenders
2	Fadli Kamis	(Singapore)	7 November 1992 (age 33)	(Singapore) Balestier Khalsa	2022	2022
3	Ilhan Noor ^{U23}	(Singapore)	19 December 2002 (age 23)	Youth Team	2019	2022
6	Abdil Qaiyyim Mutalib ^{>30}	(Singapore)	14 May 1989 (age 37)	(Singapore) Lion City Sailors	2021	2022
13	Rio Sakuma	(Japan)	14 April 1997 (age 29)	(Cambodia) Tiffy Army FC	2022	2022
14	Ahmad Syahir	(Singapore)	10 April 1992 (age 34)	(Singapore) Balestier Khalsa	2022	2022
15	Faizal Roslan	(Singapore)	30 May 1995 (age 31)	(Singapore) Lion City Sailors	2021	2022
24	Qayyum Raishyan ^{U23}	(Singapore)	5 December 2000 (age 25)	(Singapore) Young Lions FC	2022	2022
27	Tajeli Salamat	(Singapore)	7 February 1994 (age 32)	(Singapore) Lion City Sailors	2020	2022
Midfielders
4	Takahiro Tezuka	(Japan)	25 June 1998 (age 28)	(Japan) Albirex Niigata (S)	2022	2022
5	Joshua Pereira	(Singapore)	10 October 1997 (age 28)	(Singapore) SAFSA	2020	2022
10	Vincent Bezecourt	(France)	10 June 1993 (age 33)	(Armenia) FC Alashkert	2022	2022
11	Huzaifah Aziz	(Singapore)	27 June 1994 (age 32)	(Singapore) Tampines Rovers	2022	2022
16	Umar Ramle	(Singapore)	2 May 1996 (age 30)	Youth Team	2016	2022
17	Noor Ariff	(Singapore)	6 September 1998 (age 28)	(Singapore) Police SA	2017	2022
18	Khairul Hairie ^{U23}	(Singapore)	9 April 2000 (age 26)	(Singapore) Lion City Sailors U21	2022	2022
Forwards
7	Hazzuwan Halim	(Singapore)	2 February 1994 (age 32)	(Singapore) Balestier Khalsa	2022	2022
8	Fareez Farhan	(Singapore)	29 July 1994 (age 32)	(Singapore) Hougang United	2019	2022
9	Šime Žužul	(Croatia)	10 January 1996 (age 30)	(Singapore) Balestier Khalsa	2022	2022
Players who left during season
20	Suria Prakash	(Singapore)	23 December 1993 (age 32)	(Singapore) Tanjong Pagar United	2022	2022
22	Yeo Hai Ngee	(Singapore)	12 January 1995 (age 31)	(Singapore) Balestier Khalsa	2022	2022
23	Zulfadhmi Suzliman	(Singapore)	10 February 1996 (age 30)	(Singapore) Balestier Khalsa	2022	2022
Players on NS / loaned out
	Wayne Chew ^{U23}	(Singapore)	22 October 2001 (age 24)	Youth Team	2019	2021
	Harith Kanadi ^{U23}	(Singapore)	1 August 2000 (age 26)	(Singapore) Tampines Rovers U19	2019	2023
	Nur Luqman	(Singapore)	20 June 1998 (age 28)	(Singapore) Young Lions FC	2020	2021
	Zikos Vasileios Chua ^{U21}	(Singapore)	15 April 2002 (age 24)	(Singapore) NFA U16	2018	2021
	Elijah Lim Teck Yong ^{U21}	(Singapore)	8 May 2001 (age 25)	(Singapore) Balestier Khalsa	2021	2021

== Coaching staff ==
Position	Name	Ref.
Chairman	(Singapore) Thomas Gay	
General manager	(Singapore)	
Assistant general manager	(Singapore) Leonard Koh	
Head coach	(Singapore) Mohd Noor Ali	2 years contract till 2024
Assistant Coach	(Singapore) Syed Azmir	
Head of Youth	(Singapore) Aidil Sulaiman	
U17 Coach	(Singapore) Azlan Alipah	
U15 Coach	(Singapore) Nor Azli Yusoff	
Fitness Coach	(Singapore) Muzhaffar Shah	
Goalkeeping Coach	(Singapore) Yusri Aziz	
Team Manager	(Singapore)	
Physiotherapist	(Singapore)	
Kitman	(Singapore) Abdul Latiff	
Sports Scientist	(Singapore) Andi Agus	
Sports Trainer	(Singapore) Benjamin Singh	

== Transfers ==
=== In ===
Pre-season

Position	Player	Transferred From	Ref
MF	(Singapore) Joshua Pereira	(Singapore) SAFSA	End of NS
MF	(Singapore) Noor Ariff	(Singapore) Police SA	End of NS
GK	(Singapore) Zulfairuuz Rudy	(Singapore) Tampines Rovers	Free
GK	(Singapore) Hafiz Ahmad	(Singapore) Project Vault FC	Free
DF	(Singapore) Fadli Kamis	(Singapore) Balestier Khalsa	Free
DF	(Singapore) Ahmad Syahir	(Singapore) Balestier Khalsa	Free
DF	(Japan) Rio Sakuma	(Cambodia) Tiffy Army FC (C1)	Free
DF	(Singapore) Faizal Roslan	(Singapore) Lion City Sailors	Free
DF	(Singapore) Yeo Hai Ngee	NA	Free
MF	(Singapore) Khairul Hairie	(Singapore) Lion City Sailors u21	Free
MF	(France) Vincent Bezecourt	(Armenia) FC Alashkert (A1)	Free
MF	(Singapore) Suria Prakash	NA	Free
MF	(Japan) Takahiro Tezuka	(Japan) Albirex Niigata (S)	Free
MF	(Singapore) Huzaifah Aziz	(Singapore) Tampines Rovers	Free
MF	(Singapore) Zulfadhmi Suzliman	NA	Free
FW	(Croatia) Šime Žužul	(Singapore) Balestier Khalsa	Free
FW	(Singapore) Hazzuwan Halim	(Singapore) Balestier Khalsa	Free
FW	(Singapore) Danish Siregar	(Singapore) Tampines Rovers U21	Free

Note 1: Joshua Pereira will only join the team in May 2022 after completing his NS.

=== Loan In ===
Mid-season

Position	Player	Transferred from	Ref
DF	(Singapore) Tajeli Salamat	(Singapore) Lion City Sailors	Season Loan

=== Loan Return ===
Pre-season

Position	Player	Transferred from	Ref
GK	(Singapore) Dylan Pereira	(Singapore) Young Lions FC	Loan Return
DF	(Singapore) Danish Irfan	(Singapore) Young Lions FC	Loan Return

Note 1: Danish Irfan subsequently moved to Tampines Rovers after his contract ended.

=== Out ===
Pre-season

Position	Player	Transferred To	Ref
DF	(Singapore) Faizal Roslan	(Singapore) Lion City Sailors	Loan Return
MF	(Singapore) Iqram Rifqi	(Singapore) Lion City Sailors	Loan Return
GK	(Singapore) Hairul Syirhan	(Singapore) Balestier Khalsa	Free
DF	(Singapore) Darren Teh	(Singapore) Balestier Khalsa	Free
DF	(Singapore) Adam Hakeem	(Singapore)	Free
DF	(Japan) Yuki Ichikawa	NA	Retired
DF	(Singapore) Afiq Yunos	(Singapore)	Free
DF	(Singapore) Danish Irfan	(Singapore) Tampines Rovers	Free
MF	(Singapore) Firdaus Kasman	(Singapore) Tampines Rovers	Free
MF	(Singapore) Christopher van Huizen	(Singapore) Tampines Rovers	Free
MF	(Singapore) Izzdin Shafiq	(Singapore) Admiralty Football Club (SFL2)	Free
MF	(Netherlands) Barry Maguire	(Netherlands) Den Bosch (N2)	Free
MF	(Australia) Danny Kim	(Australia) Bentleigh Greens SC (A2)	Free
MF	(Singapore) Furqan Raoff	(Singapore)	Free
MF	(Singapore) Asshukrie Wahid	(Singapore) Balestier Khalsa	Free
FW	(Singapore) Idris Sadlizan	(Singapore) GFA Sporting Westlake (SFL1)	Free
FW	(Brazil) Matheus Moresche	(Australia) Central Coast Mariners (A1)	Free
FW	(Singapore) Amy Recha	(Singapore) Hougang United	Free
FW	(Singapore) Ifwat Ismail	(Singapore) Simei United (IWL)	Free

Note 1: Faisal Roslan subsequently returned to the club after his contract with Lion City Sailors ended.

Mid-season

Position	Player	Transferred To	Ref
DF	(Singapore) Yeo Hai Ngee	NA	Free
MF	(Singapore) Zulfadhmi Suzliman	NA	Free
MF	(Singapore) Suria Prakash	NA	Free

=== Loan Out ===
Pre-season

Position	Player	Transferred To	Ref
GK	(Singapore) Wayne Chew	(Singapore) SAFSA	NS till 2023
DF	(Singapore) Harith Kanadi	(Singapore) SAFSA	NS till 2023
MF	(Singapore) Elijah Lim Teck Yong	(Singapore) SAFSA	NS till 2023
MF	(Singapore) Nur Luqman	(Singapore) SAFSA	NS till 2023
MF	(Singapore) Azri Suhaili	(Singapore) SAFSA	NS till 2023
FW	(Singapore) Zikos Vasileios Chua	(Singapore) SAFSA	NS till 2023

Note: Harith Kanadi, Elijah Lim and Zikos Vasileios Chua subsequently was snapped by Young Lions on loan for the season.

=== Extension / Retained ===
Position	Player	Ref
Coach	(Singapore) Mohd Noor Ali	2 years extension till 2024
GK	(Singapore) Zaiful Nizam	3 year contract till 2023
DF	(Singapore) Abdil Qaiyyim Mutalib	1 year contract till 2022
DF	(Singapore) Ilhan Noor	1 year contract till 2022
MF	(Singapore) Umar Ramle	1 year contract till 2022
FW	(Singapore) Fareez Farhan	1 year contract till 2022

=== Rumored ===
Pre-season

Position	Player	Last Club	Ref

== Friendlies ==
=== Pre-season friendlies ===
Win Draw Loss

22 January 2022 1	Geylang International (Singapore)	1–0	(Singapore) Young Lions FC	Tampines
	Azri Suhaili			Stadium: Our Tampines Hub

28 January 2022 2	Tampines Rovers (Singapore)	4–3	(Singapore) Geylang International	Tampines
	Boris Kopitović 40'; Irfan Najeeb 45'; 93'; Ong Yu En (pen.)	Report	Sime Zuzul 45'	Stadium: Our Tampines Hub

=== Mid-Season Friendly ===
9 June 2022 Friendly	Selangor F.C. (Malaysia)	4–2	(Singapore) Geylang International	Selangor
	Hyuri; Caion (pen.); Aliff Haiqal; Zikri Khalili		Hazzuwan Halim; Vincent Bezecourt	Stadium: UiTM Stadium

== Team statistics ==
=== Appearances and goals ===
As of 6 Nov 2022.

No.	Pos.	Player	SPL		Singapore Cup		Total	
No.	Pos.	Player	Apps.	Goals	Apps.	Goals	Apps.	Goals
1	GK	(Singapore) Zulfairuuz Rudy	1	0	0	0	1	0
2	DF	(Singapore) Fadli Kamis	6	0	0	0	6	0
3	DF	(Singapore) Ilhan Noor	15+6	1	3	0	24	1
4	MF	(Japan) Takahiro Tezuka	28	3	3	0	30	3
5	MF	(Singapore) Joshua Pereira	18+1	1	2	0	21	1
6	DF	(Singapore) Abdil Qaiyyim Mutalib	13+4	1	0	0	17	1
7	FW	(Singapore) Hazzuwan Halim	19+8	5	3	2	30	7
8	FW	(Singapore) Fareez Farhan	2+11	0	1+1	0	15	0
9	FW	(Croatia) Šime Žužul	27	18	2	1	29	19
10	MF	(France) Vincent Bezecourt	26+1	10	3	0	30	10
11	MF	(Singapore) Huzaifah Aziz	23	0	2	0	25	0
13	DF	(Japan) Rio Sakuma	28	1	3	0	31	1
14	DF	(Singapore) Ahmad Syahir	14+12	0	1+1	0	28	0
15	DF	(Singapore) Faizal Roslan	26	1	2+1	0	29	1
16	MF	(Singapore) Umar Ramle	7+10	1	0+3	0	20	1
17	MF	(Singapore) Noor Ariff	0+1	0	1	0	2	0
18	MF	(Singapore) Khairul Hairie	12+3	1	0+3	1	18	2
19	GK	(Singapore) Zaiful Nizam	25	0	3	0	28	0
21	GK	(Singapore) Hafiz Ahmad	2	0	0	0	2	0
24	DF	(Singapore) Qayyum Raishyan	0+1	0	0+1	0	2	0
27	DF	(Singapore) Tajeli Salamat	15+1	3	3	0	19	3
52	FW	(Singapore) Danish Siregar	0+3	0	0+1	0	4	0
54	DF	(Singapore) Kieran Teo Jia Jun	1+2	0	1	0	4	0
55	FW	(Singapore) Danish Haziq	1	0	0	0	1	0
57	FW	(Singapore) Azri Suhaili	0	0	0+1	0	1	0
59	MF	(Singapore) Furqan Raoff	0+1	0	0	0	1	0
62	MF	(Singapore) Ariffin Noor	0+3	1	0+1	0	3	1
Players who have played this season but had left the club or on loan to other club
20	MF	(Singapore) Suria Prakash	0+1	0	0	0	1	0
22	DF	(Singapore) Yeo Hai Ngee	0+2	0	0	0	2	0
23	MF	(Singapore) Zulfadhmi Suzliman	0+2	0	0	0	2	0

== Competitions ==
=== Overview ===
Competition	Record							
Competition	P	W	D	L	GF	GA	GD	Win %

Results summary (SPL)

Overall								Home						Away					
Pld	W	D	L	GF	GA	GD	Pts	W	D	L	GF	GA	GD	W	D	L	GF	GA	GD
28	10	9	9	48	46	+2	39	4	6	4	22	21	+1	6	3	5	26	25	+1

=== Singapore Premier League ===
Win Draw Loss

4 March 2022 1	Geylang International (Singapore)	1–0	(Singapore) Lion City Sailors	Tampines
	Vincent Bezecourt 9'; Ahmad Syahir (yellow card) 31'; Mohd Noor Ali (yellow card) 69'; Zaiful Nizam (yellow card) 90+4'	Report	Saifullah Akbar (yellow card) 22'; Pedro Henrique (red card) 34'; Anumanthan Kumar (yellow card) 68'; Hafiz Nor (yellow card) 78'	Stadium: Our Tampines Hub; Attendance: 978; Referee: Taufik Thana

11 March 2022 2	Hougang United (Singapore)	3–2	(Singapore) Geylang International	Hougang
	André Moritz 72' 90'; Amy Rechal 74' (pen.); Nazhiim Harman (yellow card) 42'	Report	Šime Žužul 4'; Takahiro Tezuka 88'; Huzaifah Aziz (yellow card) 48'	Stadium: Hougang Stadium; Referee: Muhammad Taqi

19 March 2022 3	Tanjong Pagar United (Singapore)	1–1	(Singapore) Geylang International	Jurong East
	Reo Nishiguchi 63'; Aqhari Abdullah (yellow card) 10'; Mario Sugic (yellow card) 25'; Naufal Ilham (yellow card) 68'; Raihan Rahman (yellow card) 90'	Report	Hazzuwan Halim 74'; Takahiro Tezuka (yellow card) 40'	Stadium: Jurong East Stadium; Referee: Ahmad A'qashah

2 April 2022 4	Geylang International (Singapore)	2–3	(Singapore) Tampines Rovers	Tampines
	Šime Žužul 9'; Khairul Hairie 30'; Ahmad Syahir (yellow card) 53' (yellow-red card) 55'; Vincent Bezecourt (yellow card) 83'	Report	Boris Kopitović 14' (pen.) 86' (yellow card) 87'; Christopher van Huizen 66'; Yasir Hanapi (yellow card) 39'; Firdaus Kasman (yellow card) 48'	Stadium: Our Tampines Hub; Attendance: 894; Referee: Andrea Verolino

5 April 2022 5	Geylang International (Singapore)	2–2	(Japan) Albirex Niigata (S)	Tampines
	Šime Žužul 30'; Hazzuwan Halim 44'; Abdil Qaiyyim Mutalib (yellow card) 38'; Faizal Roslan (red card) 60'	Report	Abdil Qaiyyim Mutalib 6' (o.g.); Masahiro Sugita 35'; Nicky Melvin Singh (yellow card) 61'	Stadium: Our Tampines Hub; Referee: Hilmi Fuad

10 April 2022 6	Geylang International (Singapore)	0–1	(Singapore) Balestier Khalsa	Tampines
	Ahmad Syahir (yellow card) 30'; Zaiful Nizam (yellow card) 55'; Kieran Teo (yellow card) 85'	Report	Shuhei Hoshino 61'; Ensar Brunčević (yellow card) 27'; Rudy Khairullah (yellow card) 58'	Stadium: Our Tampines Hub; Referee: Taufik Thana

16 April 2022 7	Young Lions FC (Singapore)	4–1	(Singapore) Geylang International	Jalan Besar
	Zikos Vasileios Chua 7'; Ryhan Stewart 21' 58' (yellow card) 22'; Qayyum Raishyan 83' (o.g.); Shah Shahiran (yellow card) 66'; Jacob Mahler (yellow card) 72'	Report	Šime Žužul 71' (pen.); Huzaifah Aziz (yellow card) 61'	Stadium: Jalan Besar Stadium; Referee: Abirami Naidu

21 June 2022 8 (Rescheduled)	Geylang International (Singapore)	2–2	(Singapore) Young Lions FC	Tampines
	Takahiro Tezuka 16'; Hazzuwan Halim 46'; Joshua Pereira (yellow card) 75'; Faizal Roslan (yellow card) 85'; Umar Ramle (yellow card) 85'; Ahmad Syahir (yellow card) 90'	Report	Danish Qayyum 80' (yellow card) 85'; Syed Akmal 90+1' (yellow card) 15'; Harith Kanadi (yellow card) 58'; Rasaq Akeem (yellow card) 90+2'	Stadium: Our Tampines Hub; Referee: Hilmi Fuad

14 May 2022 9	Lion City Sailors (Singapore)	1–0	(Singapore) Geylang International	Jalan Besar
	Diego Lopes 35'; Song Ui-young (yellow card) 47'; Shahdan Sulaiman (yellow card) 59'; Maxime Lestienne (yellow card) 90+3'	Report	Faizal Roslan (yellow card) 26'	Stadium: Jalan Besar Stadium; Referee: Abirami Naidu

22 May 2022 10	Geylang International (Singapore)	0–0	(Singapore) Hougang United	Tampines
	Umar Ramle (yellow card) 74'		Kristijan Krajcek (yellow card) 50'; Hafiz Sujad (yellow card) 70'; Farhan Zulkifli (yellow card) 78'; Lionel Tan (yellow card) 90+2'	Stadium: Our Tampines Hub; Referee: Clearance Leow

27 May 2022 11	Albirex Niigata (S) (Japan)	8–2	(Singapore) Geylang International	Jurong East
	Kodai Tanaka 11' 40' 71'; Zamani Zamri 44'; Masahiro Sugita 65'; Kan Kobayashi 70' 80'; Ilhan Fandi 85'; Masaya Idetsu (yellow card) 90'	Report	Abdil Qaiyyim Mutalib 28'; Šime Žužul 49'; Huzaifah Aziz (yellow card) 31'; Ahmad Syahir (yellow card) 86'	Stadium: Jurong East Stadium; Referee: Taufik Thana; Man of the Match: (Singapore) Ilhan Fandi

18 June 2022 12	Tampines Rovers (Singapore)	2–0	(Singapore) Geylang International	Tampines
	Yasir Hanapi 33' (yellow card) 79'; Boris Kopitović 84'; Zehrudin Mehmedović (yellow card) 23'; Firdaus Kasman (yellow card) 74'	Report	Huzaifah Aziz (yellow card) 58' (yellow-red card) 83'	Stadium: Our Tampines Hub; Referee: Jansen Foo

26 June 2022 13	Geylang International (Singapore)	1–0	(Singapore) Tanjong Pagar United	Tampines
	Vincent Bezecourt 5' (yellow card) 87'; Takahiro Tezuka (yellow card) 67'; Huzaifah Aziz (yellow card) 74'; Hazzuwan Halim (yellow card) 82'	Report	Raihan Rahman (yellow card) 49'; Faritz Hameed (yellow card) 67'; Reo Nishiguchi (yellow card) 67'; Blake Ricciuto (yellow card) 67'	Stadium: Our Tampines Hub; Referee: Muhammad Taqi

2 July 2022 14	Balestier Khalsa (Singapore)	0–2	(Singapore) Geylang International	Toa Payoh
	Ensar Brunčević (yellow card) 61'	Report	Šime Žužul 49' (pen.); Hazzuwan Halim 78'; Faizal Roslan (yellow card) 77'	Stadium: Toa Payoh Stadium; Referee: Clarence Leow Hong Wei

8 July 2022 15	Young Lions FC (Singapore)	0–2	(Singapore) Geylang International	Jalan Besar
	Shah Shahiran (yellow card) 72'	Report	Šime Žužul 72' (pen.); Tajeli Salamat 90'; Rio Sakuma (yellow card) 7'; Tajeli Salamat (yellow card) 84'	Stadium: Jalan Besar Stadium; Referee: Farhad Mohamed

16 July 2022 16 (Rescheduled)	Geylang International (Singapore)	1–1	(Singapore) Lion City Sailors	Tampines
	Šime Žužul 43' (pen.); Khairul Hairie (yellow card) 50'	Report	Shahdan Sulaiman 45+2'	Stadium: Our Tampines Hub; Referee: Hilmi Fuad

22 July 2022 17	Hougang United (Singapore)	1–2	(Singapore) Geylang International	Hougang
	Pedro Bortoluzo 34'; Mukundan Maran (yellow card) 64'; Nazrul Nazari (yellow card) 68'; Shawal Anuar (yellow card) 75'	Report	Vincent Bezecourt 77'; Šime Žužul 88'	Stadium: Hougang Stadium; Referee: Taufik Thana

30 July 2022 18	Tanjong Pagar United (Singapore)	0–5	(Singapore) Geylang International	Jurong East
	Faizal Raffi (yellow card) 39'	Report	Vincent Bezecourt 2' 56'; Takahiro Tezuka 22'; Šime Žužul 24'; Rio Sakuma 67'	Stadium: Jurong East Stadium; Referee: Andrea Verolino

3 August 2022 19	Geylang International (Singapore)	1–4	(Singapore) Tampines Rovers	Tampines
	Šime Žužul 85'; Rio Sakuma (yellow card) 19'; Ahmad Syahir (yellow card) 79'	Report	Boris Kopitović 39' 90+1'; Zehrudin Mehmedović 70'; Kyoga Nakamura 87'; Firdaus Kasman (yellow card) 18'; Christopher van Huizen (yellow card) 51'	Stadium: Our Tampines Hub; Referee: Taufik Thana

14 August 2022 20	Albirex Niigata (S) (Japan)	2–2	(Singapore) Geylang International	Jurong East
	Ilhan Fandi 58'; Tadanari Lee 90+5'	Report	Vincent Bezecourt 51' (yellow card) 90+5'; Šime Žužul 71' (pen.) (yellow card) 90+6'; Faizal Roslan (yellow card) 61'; Umar Ramle (red card) 90+3'; Abdil Qaiyyim Mutalib (yellow card) 90+4'	Stadium: Jurong East Stadium; Referee: Farhad Mohamed

21 August 2022 21	Geylang International (Singapore)	3–0	(Singapore) Balestier Khalsa	Tampines
	Šime Žužul 37' (pen.) 80'; Ariffin Noor 90+3'; Rio Sakuma (yellow card) 76'; Takahiro Tezuka (yellow card) 88'	Report	Ensar Brunčević (yellow card) 61'; Delwinder Singh (yellow card) 61'; Asshukrie Wahid (yellow card) 68'	Stadium: Our Tampines Hub; Referee: Shadiq Al-Hussain

27 August 2022 22	Geylang International (Singapore)	3–0	(Singapore) Young Lions FC	Tampines
	Joshua Pereira 32'; Šime Žužul 46' 61'	Report		Stadium: Our Tampines Hub; Referee: Hilmi Fuad

4 September 2022 23	Lion City Sailors (Singapore)	1–3	(Singapore) Geylang International	Jalan Besar
	Maxime Lestienne 7'; Hariss Harun (yellow card) 81'; Hafiz Nor (yellow card) 83'; Kim Shin-wook (yellow card) 90+4'	Report	Vincent Bezecourt 12' 36'; Hazzuwan Halim 43'; Ilhan Noor (yellow card) 18'; Umar Ramle (yellow card) 21'; Takahiro Tezuka (yellow card) 90+5'	Stadium: Jalan Besar Stadium; Referee: Jansen Foo

11 September 2022 24	Geylang International (Singapore)	2–4	(Singapore) Hougang United	Tampines
	Umar Ramle 7'; Faizal Roslan 36'; Noor Ali (yellow card) 45+3'	Report	Pedro Bortoluzo 42' (yellow card) 45+2'; André Moritz 61'; Shawal Anuar 85'; Kristijan Krajcek 90+5'; Fabian Kwok (yellow card) 31'; Clement Ong (yellow card) 90+1'	Stadium: Our Tampines Hub; Referee: Abirami Naidu

21 October 2022 25 (Rescheduled)	Geylang International (Singapore)	1–1	(Japan) Albirex Niigata (S)	Tampines
	Šime Žužul 65' (pen.); Umar Ramle (yellow card) 25'	Report	Kodai Tanaka 74'; Kan Kobayashi (yellow card) 55'	Stadium: Our Tampines Hub; Referee: Farhad Mohamed

1 October 2022 26	Tampines Rovers (Singapore)	0–0	(Singapore) Geylang International	Tampines
		Report		Stadium: Our Tampines Hub; Referee: Ahmad A'qashah

9 October 2022 27	Geylang International (Singapore)	3–3	(Singapore) Tanjong Pagar United	Tampines
	Vincent Bezecourt 31' 90+3'; Shakir Hamzah 41' (o.g.); Huzaifah Aziz (yellow card) 25' (yellow-red card) 57'	Report	Blake Ricciuto 64' (yellow card) 90+5'; Khairul Nizam 72'; Reo Nishiguchi 89'; Raihan Rahman (yellow card) 27'; Rusyaidi Salime (yellow card) 45'; Shakir Hamzah (yellow card) 90+1'	Stadium: Our Tampines Hub; Referee: Andrea Verolino

14 October 2022 28 (Rescheduled)	Balestier Khalsa (Singapore)	2–4	(Singapore) Geylang International	Toa Payoh
	Ryoya Tanigushi 40'; Daniel Goh 90+4'; Kuraba Kondo (yellow card) 32'; Ignatius Ang (yellow card) 71'	Report	Šime Žužul 21'; Ilhan Noor 44'; Tajeli Salamat 47' 90'; Hazzuwan Halim (yellow card) 80'; Zulfairuuz Rudy (yellow card) 83'	Stadium: Toa Payoh Stadium; Referee: Farhad Mohamed

Pos	Team	Pld	W	D	L	GF	GA	GD	Pts	Qualification or relegation
1	Albirex Niigata (S) (Note: The foreign club – Albirex Niigata (S) – as well as the Football Association of Singapore (FAS) under-21 team, Young Lions, are ineligible for any AFC competition spots.) (C)	28	17	8	3	88	43	+45	59	
2	Lion City Sailors (Q)	28	18	3	7	91	39	+52	57	Qualification for AFC Champions League Group stage
3	Tampines Rovers (Q)	28	15	5	8	76	57	+19	50	Standby team for AFC Cup group stage
4	Geylang International	28	10	9	9	48	46	+2	39	
5	Hougang United	28	10	9	9	65	71	−6	39	Qualification for AFC Cup group stage (Cup Winner)
6	Tanjong Pagar United	28	10	7	11	59	69	−10	37	
7	Balestier Khalsa	28	7	3	18	45	78	−33	24	
8	Young Lions	28	2	2	24	34	103	−69	8	

Source: Singapore Premier League
Rules for classification: 1) points; 2) goal difference; 3) number of goals scored; 4) number of wins
(C) Champions; (Q) Qualified for the phase indicated

=== Singapore Cup ===
Pos	Team	Pld	W	D	L	GF	GA	GD	Pts	Qualification
1	Tampines Rovers (Q)	3	2	0	1	7	4	+3	6	Semi-finals
2	Hougang United (Q)	3	2	0	1	6	4	+2	6	Semi-finals
3	Tanjong Pagar United	3	2	0	1	6	6	0	6	
4	Geylang International	3	0	0	3	4	9	−5	0	

Updated to match(es) played on 25 September 2022. Source: FAS
(Q) Qualified for the phase indicated

Win Draw Loss

==== Group ====
28 October 2022 Match 1	Geylang International (Singapore)	2–3	(Singapore) Tampines Rovers	Tampines
	Šime Žužul 67'; Khairul Hairie 88'; Joshua Pereira (yellow card) 32'; Ahmad Syahir (yellow card) 55'; Huzaifah Aziz (yellow card) 69'	Report	Faizal Roslan 3' (o.g.); Boris Kopitović 44' (pen.); Kyoga Nakamura 90+1'	Stadium: Our Tampines Hub; Referee: Shadiq Al-Hussain

1 November 2022 Match 2	Hougang United (Singapore)	4–1	(Singapore) Geylang International	Hougang
	Shawal Anuar 34'; Amy Recha 48'; André Moritz 55'; Kristijan Krajcek 75' (yellow card) 45+2'; Anders Aplin (yellow card) 85'; Sahil Suhaimi (yellow card) 90+3'	Report	Hazzuwan Halim 9'; Huzaifah Aziz (yellow card) 34'; Ahmad Syahir (yellow card) 45'; Joshua Pereira (yellow card) 90+3'; Umar Ramle (yellow card) 90+3'	Stadium: Hougang Stadium; Referee: Muhammad Taqi

6 November 2022 Match 3	Tanjong Pagar United (Singapore)	2–1	(Singapore) Geylang International	Jurong East
	Khairul Amri 43'; Reo Nishiguchi 56'; Rusyaidi Salime (yellow card) 34'; Raihan Rahman (yellow card) 42'	Report	Hazzuwan Halim 41'	Stadium: Jurong East Stadium; Referee: Shadiq Al-Hussain
