= Kohei Tezuka =

Japanese footballer

Kohei Tezuka 手塚 康平
Personal information
- Full name: Kohei Tezuka
- Date of birth: April 6, 1996 (age 30)
- Place of birth: Utsunomiya, Japan
- Height: 1.76 m (5 ft 9 1/2 in)
- Position: Midfielder

Team information
- Current team: Kashiwa Reysol
- Number: 17

Youth career
- 2002–2008: Tomozo SC
- 2009–2014: Kashiwa Reysol

Senior career*
| Years | Team | Apps | (Gls) |
| 2015 | Onehunga Sports | 22 | (4) |
| 2016–2020 | Kashiwa Reysol | 52 | (3) |
| 2020 | → Yokohama FC (loan) | 28 | (0) |
| 2021–2022 | Yokohama FC | 37 | (2) |
| 2022–2024 | Sagan Tosu | 46 | (1) |
| 2024– | Kashiwa Reysol | 14 | (0) |
- * Club domestic league appearances and goals as of 10 September 2025

Kohei Tezuka (手塚 康平, Tezuka Kohei; born April 6, 1996) is a Japanese professional footballer who plays primarily as a defensive-midfielder for J1 League club Kashiwa Reysol. He is also capable of playing as a central-midfielder or occasionally as an attacking-midfielder.

== Club career ==
=== Onehunga Sports ===
While playing in Kashiwa Reysol youth ranks, Kohei opted for an abroad experience in New Zealand, where he signed for Onehunga Sports on 26 March 2015.

=== Return to Kashiwa Reysol ===
On 8 January 2016, Kohei then came back to Reysol, finding his first cap only after a year of orientation. He debuted on 15 March 2017 in a J. League Cup match against Shimizu S-Pulse and he even scored the winning-goal for Reysol.

=== Yokohama FC ===
On 1 February 2020, Kohei joined J1 League outfits, Yokohama FC on loan however on 1 February 2021, he joined the club on free after his loan contract expired.

=== Sagan Tosu ===
On 25 July 2022, Kohei joined J1 League club, Sagan Tosu. On 10 May 2023, he scored his first goal for the club in a 2–0 away win against Urawa Red Diamonds. Kohei than went on to contribute 3 consecutive assists in 3 games throughout the season.

=== Third stint at Kashiwa Reysol ===
On 5 August 2024, Kohei returned to his former club Kashiwa Reysol.

== Personal life ==
Kohei is the older brother of fellow professional footballer, Takahiro Tezuka who is currently playing for Thai League 2 club Bangkok FC

== Club statistics ==
As of 30 August 2022.

Appearances and goals by club, season and competition
| Club | Season | League | | | National cup | | League cup | | Other | | Total | |
| Club | Season | Division | Apps | Goals | Apps | Goals | Apps | Goals | Apps | Goals | Apps | Goals |
| Japan | | | League | | Emperor's Cup | | J. League Cup | | Other | | Total | |
|---|---|---|---|---|---|---|---|---|---|---|---|---|
| Kashiwa Reysol | 2016 | J1 League | 0 | 0 | 0 | 0 | 0 | 0 | - | | 0 | 0 |
| Kashiwa Reysol | 2017 | J1 League | 16 | 2 | 0 | 0 | 2 | 1 | - | | 18 | 3 |
| Kashiwa Reysol | 2018 | J1 League | 18 | 1 | 0 | 0 | 4 | 0 | 1 (Note: Appearances in the AFC Champions League) | 0 | 23 | 1 |
| Kashiwa Reysol | 2019 | J2 League | 18 | 0 | 2 | 1 | 3 | 0 | - | | 23 | 1 |
| Kashiwa Reysol | Total | | 52 | 3 | 2 | 1 | 9 | 1 | 1 | 0 | 64 | 5 |
| Yokohama FC (loan) | 2020 | J1 League | 28 | 0 | 0 | 0 | 2 | 0 | - | | 30 | 0 |
| Yokohama FC | 2021 | J1 League | 15 | 2 | 0 | 0 | 5 | 0 | - | | 20 | 2 |
| Yokohama FC | 2022 | J2 League | 22 | 0 | 1 | 0 | - | | - | | 23 | 0 |
| Yokohama FC | Total | | 65 | 2 | 1 | 0 | 7 | 0 | 0 | 0 | 73 | 2 |
| Sagan Tosu | 2022 | J1 League | 2 | 0 | 0 | 0 | 0 | 0 | - | | 2 | 0 |
| Total | | | 119 | 5 | 3 | 1 | 16 | 1 | 1 | 0 | 139 | 7 |
