= Nikola Ignjatovic =

Croatian footballer

Personal information
- Date of birth: 2 February 1998 (age 28)
- Place of birth: Đakovo, Croatia
- Height: 1.86 m (6 ft 1 in)
- Position: Defender

Team information
- Current team: Geylang International

Youth career
- 2012–2017: OFK Beograd

Senior career*
Years	Team	Apps	(Gls)
2017–2020	OFK Beograd	5	(0)
2020–2022	Žarkovo	49	(1)
2022–2023	Radnički Sremska Mitrovica	23	(2)
2023–2024	Diagoras	11	(1)
2024	Aiolikos	10	(0)
2024–2025	Smederevo 1924	27	(0)
2025–	Geylang International	0	(0)
- * Club domestic league appearances and goals as of 3 July 2025

Nikola Ignjatovic (born 2 January 1998), is a Serbian professional footballer who plays as a defender for Singapore Premier League club Geylang International

== Club career ==
=== OFK Beograd ===
Ignjatovic was part of OFK Beograd youth academy where in February 2017, he was promoted to the senior team. Ignjatovic make his professional career debut coming on as a substitution in the 20th minute of the match to replace Drasko Ignjatovic who got injured

=== Žarkovo ===
On 21 July 2020, Ignjatovic moved to Žarkovo. He make his debut for the club on 14 August 2020 in a goalless draw against Jagodina. On 20 March 2021, Ignjatovic scored his first career goal where he scored a header to score the only goal in the match against Radnički Sremska Mitrovica.

=== Radnički Sremska Mitrovica ===
On 15 September 2022, Ignjatovic then joined Radnički Sremska Mitrovica. He ended the season with 25 appearances for the club in all competition and scoring 2 goals.

=== Diagoras ===
On 21 July 2023, Ignjatovic then joined Super League Greece 2 club Diagoras.

=== Aiolikos ===
On 31 January 2024, Ignjatovic was announced as the new signing for another Greek club Aiolikos .

=== Smederevo 1924 ===
On 3 July 2024, Ignjatovic returned to Serbia to sign with Smederevo 1924. On 15 February 2025, he scored an equaliser against his former club, Radnički Sremska Mitrovica which the game ended at 1–1.

=== Geylang International ===
On 3 July 2025, Ignjatovic moved to Southeast Asia to joined Singapore Premier League club Geylang International. Ignjatovic reunited in the region with his former OFK Beograd teammate, Miloš Zlatković who currently plays for Geylang International's rivals, Tampines Rovers.

== Career statistics ==
=== Club ===
As of 15 June 2025

Club	Season	League			Cup		Continental		Other		Total	
Club	Season	Division	Apps	Goals	Apps	Goals	Apps	Goals	Apps	Goals	Apps	Goals
OFK Beograd	2019–20	Serbian First League	0	0	2	0	0	0	0	0	2	0
OFK Beograd	Total		0	0	2	0	0	0	0	0	2	0
OFK Žarkovo	2020–21	Serbian First League	d	1	1	0	0	0	0	0	33	1
OFK Žarkovo	2021–22	Serbian First League	17	1	1	0	0	0	0	0	18	1
OFK Žarkovo	Total		49	2	2	0	0	0	0	0	51	2
Radnik Surdulica	2021–22	Serbian SuperLiga	4	0	0	0	0	0	0	0	4	0
Radnik Surdulica	2022–23	Serbian SuperLiga	7	7	7	0	0	0	0	0	7	0
Radnik Surdulica	Total		11	0	0	0	0	0	0	0	11	0
Radnički Sremska	2022–23	Serbian First League	23	2	2	0	0	0	0	0	25	2
Radnički Sremska	Total		23	2	2	0	0	0	0	0	25	2
Diagoras	2023–24	Super League Greece 2	11	1	0	0	0	0	0	0	11	1
Diagoras	Total		11	1	0	0	0	0	0	0	11	1
Aiolikos	2023–24	Super League Greece 2	10	0	0	0	0	0	0	0	10	0
Aiolikos	Total		10	0	0	0	0	0	0	0	10	0
Smederevo 1924	2024–25	Serbian First League	27	1	1	0	0	0	0	0	28	1
Smederevo 1924	Total		27	1	1	0	0	0	0	0	28	1
Geylang International	2025–26	Singapore Premier League	0	0	0	0	0	0	0	0	0	0
Geylang International	Total		0	0	0	0	0	0	0	0	0	0
Career total			112	16	0	0	0	0	0	0	112	16
