= Akram Azman =

Singaporean footballer (born 2000)

Personal information
- Full name: Akram bin Azman
- Date of birth: 21 November 2000 (age 25)
- Place of birth: Singapore
- Height: 1.75 m (5 ft 9 in)
- Positions: Full-back; centre-back

Team information
- Current team: FC Jurong
- Number: 30

Youth career
- NFA

Senior career*
Years	Team	Apps	(Gls)
2019–2020	Young Lions	6	(0)
2022–2025	Tanjong Pagar United	52	(4)
2025–2026	Lion City Sailors	17	(1)
2026–	FC Jurong	0	(0)

International career^{‡}
2019–2023	Singapore U23		
2025–	Singapore	3	(0)
- * Club domestic league appearances and goals as of August 2026 ‡ National team caps and goals as of 18 November 2025

Akram bin Azman (born 21 November 2000), better known as Akram, is a Singaporean professional footballer who plays either as a full-back or centre-back for Singapore Premier League club FC Jurong and the Singapore national team.

== Club career ==
=== Young Lions ===
Akram played for the Young Lions for the 2019 and 2020 season. The then-18-year-old made his professional career debut in a 4–1 defeat to Balestier Khalsa on 2 March 2019.

=== Tanjong Pagar United ===
After completing his national service, Akram moved to Tanjong Pagar United ahead of the 2022 season in May 2022. He then scored his first professional career goal on 10 March 2023 in a 2–0 win over Geylang International.

In July 2023, Akram was appointed as the captain of the team. He made a total of 52 league appearance for the club, scoring 4 times.

=== Lion City Sailors ===
Midway through the 2024–25 season transfer window, Akram made the switch to league leaders Lion City Sailors on 16 January 2025 after Lion City Sailors paid SGD$15,000 to sign him. Akram made his debut on 9 February 2025 against his former club Tanjong Pagar United in a 4–1 home win. On 20 February, he made his AFC Champions League Two debut against Thailand club Muangthong United. Despite Maxime Lestienne's equaliser in the 91st minute of the 2025 AFC Champions League Two final against Sharjah, Akram finished as a runner-up after a 1–2 defeat.

=== FC Jurong ===
Prior to the 2026-27 season, Akram signed with FC Jurong.

== International career ==
Akram was first called up to the national team in March 2025, for the friendly against Nepal and the 2027 AFC Asian Cup qualification against Hong Kong. He made his debut and started against Nepal on 21 March 2025.

== Style of play ==
Akram is athletic, strong in the tackle, and is versatile to play across multiple positions. Akram, who primarily plays as a full-back, can also play as a centre-back or winger.

== Personal life ==
Akram has an older brother, Naufal Azman, who is also a professional footballer. His other twin, Akmal, is also a professional footballer. Both of them are currently playing for Geylang International.

== Career statistics ==
=== Club ===
As of match played 9 April 2025

Appearances and goals by club, season and competition
Club	Season	League			National cup		League cup		Continental		Other		Total	
Club	Season	Division	Apps	Goals	Apps	Goals	Apps	Goals	Apps	Goals	Apps	Goals	Apps	Goals
Young Lions	2019	Singapore Premier League	4	0	0	0	0	0	0	0	—		4	0
Young Lions	2020	Singapore Premier League	2	0	0	0	0	0	0	0	—		2	0
Young Lions	Total		6	0	0	0	0	0	0	0	0	0	6	0
Tanjong Pagar United	2022	Singapore Premier League	18	0	1	0	0	0	0	0	—		19	0
Tanjong Pagar United	2023	Singapore Premier League	21	2	3	0	0	0	0	0	—		24	2
Tanjong Pagar United	2024–25	Singapore Premier League	13	2	0	0	0	0	0	0	—		13	2
Tanjong Pagar United	Total		52	4	4	0	0	0	0	0	0	0	56	4
Lion City Sailors	2024–25	Singapore Premier League	4	0	3	1	0	0	1 (Note: Appearance(s) in AFC Champions League Two)	0	—		8	1
Career total			62	4	7	1	0	0	1	0	0	0	70	5

=== International ===
As of match played 12 April 2025

Appearances and goals by national team and year
National team	Year	Apps	Goals
Singapore	2025	2	0
Total		2	0

== Honours ==
Lion City Sailors

- AFC Champions League Two runner-up: 2024–25
- Singapore Premier League: 2024–25
- Singapore Cup: 2024–25, 2025–26
- Singapore Community Shield runner-up: 2025
