= Calvin University (South Korea) =

University in Gyeonggi, South Korea

Coordinates: 37.3050°N 127.1287°E

- Established: 1954
- Affiliations: Presbyterian
- Location: Yongin, Gyeonggi, South Korea
- Website: http://www.calvin.ac.kr/

- Calvin University
- Hangul: 칼빈대학교
- Hanja: 칼빈大學校
- RR: Kalbin daehakgyo
- MR: K'albin taehakkyo

Calvin University is a Presbyterian-affiliated university in South Korea. The campus is located in Giheung-Gu, Yongin City, Gyeonggi province, to the south of Seoul.

== Academic departments ==
=== Undergraduate ===
- Theology
- Missionary Work
- Preschool Gospel Education
- Church Music

== History ==
The school was established as the Evening School of Theology (야간신학교) in Seoul in 1954. It became a full seminary in 1962, and a four-year college (Calvin Theological College) in 1976. The current campus was purchased in 1980. A missionary research institute was established in 1989. The school formally became a university in 1997, and the graduate school was founded in 1999.

== See also ==
- List of colleges and universities in South Korea
- Education in South Korea
