= Naufal Rahmanda =

Indonesian footballer (born 2000)

Personal information
- Full name: Naufal Rahmanda
- Date of birth: May 16, 2000 (age 26)
- Place of birth: Bandung, Indonesia
- Height: 1.70 m (5 ft 7 in)
- Position: Forward

Youth career
- 2019: Semen Padang

Senior career*
| Years | Team | Apps | (Gls) |
| 2020 | PSS Sleman | 0 | (0) |
| 2021 | Persela Lamongan | 2 | (0) |
| 2022 | Semen Padang | 6 | (1) |
- * Club domestic league appearances and goals as of 30 September 2022

Naufal Rahmanda (born May 16, 2000) is an Indonesian professional footballer who plays as a forward.

== Club career ==
=== Persela Lamongan ===
He was signed for Persela Lamongan to play in Liga 1 in the 2021 season. Rahmanda made his first-team debut on 4 September 2021 in a match against PSIS Semarang at the Wibawa Mukti Stadium, Cikarang.

=== Semen Padang ===
Naufal was signed for Semen Padang to play in Liga 2 in the 2022–23 season. He made his league debut on 29 August 2022 in a match against PSPS Riau at the Riau Main Stadium, Riau.

== Career statistics ==
=== Club ===
As of 30 September 2022

| Club | Season | League | | | Cup | | Continental | | Other | | Total | |
| Club | Season | Division | Apps | Goals | Apps | Goals | Apps | Goals | Apps | Goals | Apps | Goals |
|---|---|---|---|---|---|---|---|---|---|---|---|---|
| PSS Sleman | 2020 | Liga 1 | 0 | 0 | 0 | 0 | – | | – | | 0 | 0 |
| Persela Lamongan | 2021 | Liga 1 | 2 | 0 | 0 | 0 | – | | 3 (Note: Appearances in Menpora Cup) | 0 | 5 | 0 |
| Semen Padang | 2022–23 | Liga 2 | 6 | 1 | 0 | 0 | – | | – | | 6 | 1 |
| Career total | | | 8 | 1 | 0 | 0 | 0 | 0 | 3 | 0 | 11 | 1 |
