= Akmal Azman =

Singaporean footballer

Personal information
- Full name: Akmal bin Azman
- Date of birth: 21 November 2000 (age 25)
- Place of birth: Singapore
- Height: 1.73 m (5 ft 8 in)
- Position: Defender

Team information
- Current team: Geylang International
- Number: 19

Youth career
- NFA

Senior career*
Years	Team	Apps	(Gls)
2019–2020	Young Lions FC	6	(0)
2022	Balestier Khalsa	13	(0)
2023–	Geylang International	19	(1)

International career
2021–	Singapore	0	(0)
- * Club domestic league appearances and goals as of 00:54, 31 Dec 2022 (UTC)

Akmal bin Azman (born 21 November 2000), better known as Akmal, is a Singaporean professional footballer who plays either as a full-back or winger for Singapore Premier League club Geylang International. He is the younger brother of Naufal Azman and the twin brother of Akram Azman who are both professional footballers playing for Geylang International and Lion City Sailors, respectively.

== Club ==
=== Tampines Rovers ===
He signed for the Stags in 2019.

== Personal life ==
His twin brother, Akram Azman, is also a professional footballer playing for Lion City Sailors.

His older brother, Naufal Azman, is also a professional footballer playing for the same club, Geylang International in 2023.

== Career statistics ==
=== Club ===
As of 15 March 2020

Club	Season	S.League		Singapore Cup		Singapore League Cup		Asia		Total	
Club	Season	Apps	Goals	Apps	Goals	Apps	Goals	Apps	Goals	Apps	Goals
Tampines Rovers	2019	18	0	3	0	0	0	3	0	24	0
Tampines Rovers	Total	18	0	3	0	0	0	3	0	24	0
Young Lions FC	2020	3	0	0	0	0	0	0	0	3	0
Young Lions FC	Total	3	0	0	0	0	0	0	0	3	0
Balestier Khalsa	2022	13	0	0	0	0	0	0	0	13	0
Balestier Khalsa	Total	13	0	0	0	0	0	0	0	13	0
Geylang International	2023	19	1	1	0	0	0	0	0	20	1
Geylang International	2024–25	19	0	2	0	0	0	0	0	21	0
Geylang International	Total	38	1	3	0	0	0	0	0	41	1
Career Total		59	1	6	0	0	0	3	0	68	1
