= Takahiro Tezuka =

Japanese footballer

Personal information
- Date of birth: 25 June 1998 (age 28)
- Place of birth: Tochigi, Japan
- Height: 1.81 m (5 ft 11 in)
- Position: Midfielder

Team information
- Current team: ISI Dangkor Senchey
- Number: 5

Youth career
- Tomozou SC
- –2016: Tochigi SC

College career
Years	Team	Apps	(Gls)
2017–2020	University of Tsukuba		

Senior career*
Years	Team	Apps	(Gls)
2021	Albirex Niigata (S)	21	(5)
2022–2025	Geylang International	83	(6)
2025–2026	Bangkok FC	15	(0)
2026–	ISI Dangkor Senchey	6	(1)
- * Club domestic league appearances and goals as of 17:04, 10 November 2026 (UTC)

Takahiro Tezuka (手塚 貴大, Tezuka Takahiro; born 25 June 1998) is a Japanese professional footballer who plays mainly as a central-midfielder for Cambodian Premier League club ISI Dangkor Senchey. Mainly a central-midfielder, he is also capable of playing as an attacking-midfielder, defensive-midfielder and occasionally as a centre-back.

== Club career ==
=== Albirex Niigata Singapore ===
On 23 January 2021, it was announced that Takahiro would join Albirex Niigata (S). He scored his first professional goal on his professional career debut on 13 March in a 3–1 win over Hougang United.

=== Geylang International ===
On 14 November 2021, Takahiro joined Geylang International for the 2022 Singapore Premier League season. He started the season as a centre-back, but moving upfield has added another dimension to his game as the season move on. Takahiro make his debut for the club on 4 March 2022 in a league match against Lion City Sailors. He then scored his first goal of the club in the next match against Hougang United in a 3–2 lost on 11 March.

=== Bangkok FC ===
After 5 years in Singapore, Takahiro moved to Thailand to sign with Thai League 2 club Bangkok FC.

== Personal life ==
Takahiro is the younger brother of fellow professional footballer Kohei Tezuka who is currently playing in the J1 League club Kashiwa Reysol.

== Career statistics ==
=== Club ===
As of 16 June 2025.

Club	Season	League			Cup		Other		Total	
Club	Season	Division	Apps	Goals	Apps	Goals	Apps	Goals	Apps	Goals
Albirex Niigata (S)	2021	Singapore Premier League	21	5	0	0	0	0	21	5
Albirex Niigata (S)	Total		21	5	0	0	0	0	21	5
Geylang International	2022	Singapore Premier League	28	3	3	0	0	0	31	3
Geylang International	2023	Singapore Premier League	24	1	4	2	0	0	28	3
Geylang International	2024–25	Singapore Premier League	31	2	4	0	0	0	35	2
Geylang International	Total		83	6	8	0	0	0	94	8
Bangkok	2025–26	Thai League 2	17	0	0	0	1	0	18	0
Bangkok	Total		17	0	0	0	1	0	18	0
Career total			121	11	8	0	1	0	133	13
