= Rio Sakuma =

Japanese footballer

Personal information
- Date of birth: 14 April 1997 (age 29)
- Place of birth: Niigata, Japan
- Height: 1.79 m (5 ft 10 in)
- Positions: Centre-back; right-back

Team information
- Current team: Geylang International
- Number: 13

Youth career
- Yoshida SC
- 2010–2015: Albirex Niigata

College career
Years	Team	Apps	(Gls)
2016–2019	Ryutsu Keizai University		

Senior career*
Years	Team	Apps	(Gls)
2018–2019	Ryutsu Keizai Dragons Ryugasaki	33	(2)
2020	Albirex Niigata (S)	13	(1)
2021	Tiffy Army	18	(0)
2022–	Geylang International	47	(4)
- * Club domestic league appearances and goals as of 9:30, 15 Dec 2021 (UTC)

Rio Sakuma (佐久間 理央, Sakuma Rio; born 14 April 1997) is a Japanese professional footballer who currently plays as a centre-back or right-back for Singapore Premier League Club Geylang International FC, whom his the vice-captain.

== Club career ==
Rio was a product of Albirex Niigata U18 team before joining and playing for Ryutsu Keizai University school team.

=== Ryutsu Keizai Dragons Ryugasaki ===
In 2018, Rio joined Ryutsu Keizai Dragons Ryugasaki which the club consisted largely of student players from Ryutsu Keizai University and served as a farm team of Ryutsu Keizai University.

=== Albirex Niigata Singapore ===
On 4 January 2020, Rio joined Albirex Niigata Singapore, a satellite team of his former club, Albirex Niigata. On 8 November 2020, he scored his first goal for the club against Hougang United in a 4-0 home win. Rio won his first ever piece of silverware en route to helping the club to win the 2020 Singapore Premier League title.

=== Tiffy Army ===
On 14 January 2021, Rio joined Cambodian Premier League club, Tiffy Army playing in the top tier of the Cambodia league.

=== Geylang International ===
On 27 November 2021, Geylang International announced that Rio as their third foreign signing for the 2022 season. This marked his return to Singapore after spending one season in Cambodia. He changed his jersey to no.9 for the 2023 Singapore Premier League season where on 28 February 2023, he scored a brace against Young Lions in a 4-2 home win.

== Career statistics ==
=== Club ===
As of 19 Mar 2022.

Club	Season	League			Cup		Other		Total	
Club	Season	Division	Apps	Goals	Apps	Goals	Apps	Goals	Apps	Goals
RKU Dragons	2018	Japan Football League	16	2	0	0	0	0	16	2
RKU Dragons	2019	Japan Football League	17	0	0	0	0	0	17	0
RKU Dragons	Total		33	2	0	0	0	0	33	2
Albirex Niigata (S)	2020	Singapore Premier League	13	1	0	0	0	0	13	1
Albirex Niigata (S)	Total		13	1	0	0	0	0	13	1
Tiffy Army	2021	Cambodian Premier League	18	0	0	0	0	0	18	0
Geylang International	2022	Singapore Premier League	26	1	3	0	0	0	29	1
Geylang International	2023	Singapore Premier League	22	3	0	0	0	0	22	3
Geylang International	2024–25	Singapore Premier League	19	2	1	0	0	0	20	2
Geylang International	Total		85	6	4	0	0	0	89	6
Career total			132	8	4	0	0	0	136	8

== Honours ==
=== Club ===
==== Albirex Niigata Singapore ====
- Singapore Premier League: 2020
