= Naufal Azman =

Singaporean footballer (born 1998)

Personal information
- Full name: Naufal bin Azman
- Date of birth: 10 July 1998 (age 28)
- Place of birth: Singapore
- Height: 1.75 m (5 ft 9 in)
- Positions: Winger; striker

Team information
- Current team: Lion City Sailors II
- Number: 66

Youth career
- 2014–2016: National Football Academy

Senior career*
Years	Team	Apps	(Gls)
2017–2018	Young Lions	16	(2)
2019–2021	Hougang United	16	(0)
2022	Balestier Khalsa	17	(0)
2023–2025	Geylang International	34	(6)
2025–	Lion City Sailors II	0	(0)
- * Club domestic league appearances and goals as of 11:18, 2 April 2022 (UTC)

Naufal bin Azman (born 10 July 1998), better known as Naufal, is a Singaporean professional footballer who plays either as a winger or striker for Singapore Premier League 2 club Lion City Sailors II.

== Club career ==
=== Young Lions ===
Naufal started his career in Singapore with the Garena Young Lions in the then named Singapore first tier football league, the inaugural 2018 Singapore Premier League season, making his professional debut as a 19-year-old in the 85th minute as a substitute in a comfortable 2-0 home win against Hougang United back in 2018. In his debut season with the Garena Young Lions, he netted 2 goals in 16 appearances, one of which was a right-footed shot against Albirex Niigata (S) in a 1-3 home loss and the other a header in a comfortable 2-1 away win against Hougang United where Naufal played alongside Ikhsan Fandi in a 3-5-2 formation with Fandi Ahmad as manager in the 2017-18 season.

=== Hougang United ===
On 16 October 2019, Naufal signed for Hougang United. After making 16 appearances for the Cheetahs carrying more experience and potential to be fulfilled as a player.

=== Balestier Khalsa ===
Naufal then transferred to Balestier Khalsa as a free agent to continue his football journey for the 2022 Singapore Premier League season.

=== Geylang International ===
On 7 January 2023, Naufal joined Geylang International where he would go on to have a scoring record in the season.

=== Lion City Sailors II ===
In July 2025, Naufal joined Lion City Sailors reserve team which competes in the Singapore Premier League 2.

== Personal life ==
Naufal is the older brother of twins Akmal Azman and Akram Azman who both are professional football players and play for Lion City Sailors respectively.

== Career statistics ==
=== Club ===
As of 2 April 2022.

Club	Season	League			Cup		Other		Total	
Club	Season	Division	Apps	Goals	Apps	Goals	Apps	Goals	Apps	Goals
Garena Young Lions	2018	Singapore Premier League	16	2	0	0	0	0	16	2
Garena Young Lions	Total		16	2	0	0	0	0	16	2
Hougang United	2020	Singapore Premier League	5	0	0	0	0	0	5	0
Hougang United	2021	Singapore Premier League	11	0	0	0	0	0	11	0
Hougang United	Total		16	0	0	0	0	0	16	0
Balestier Khalsa	2022	Singapore Premier League	13	0	4	0	0	0	17	0
Balestier Khalsa	Total		13	0	4	0	0	0	17	0
Geylang International	2023	Singapore Premier League	20	5	1	1	0	0	21	6
Geylang International	2024–25	Singapore Premier League	9	1	0	0	0	0	9	1
Geylang International	Total		29	6	1	1	0	0	30	7
Career total			74	8	5	1	0	0	79	9
