= 2026–27 Balestier Khalsa FC season =

Balestier Khalsa
2026–27 season
- Chairman: S Thavaneson
- Stadium: Bishan Stadium
Home colours	Away colours

The 2026–27 season is Balestier Khalsa's 31th consecutive season in the top flight of Singapore football and in the Singapore Premier League and the Singapore Cup.

This is the 2nd year since Don Darwin left the club and Marko making a comeback to coach the team.

== Squad ==
=== Singapore Premier League ===
As of 21 February 2024

No.	Name	Nationality	Date of Birth (Age)	Previous Club	Contract Since	Contract End
Goalkeepers
21	Hafiz Ahmad	(Singapore)	30 December 1998 (age 27)	(Singapore) Geylang International	2024	2027
71	Mario Mustapić	(Croatia)	22 October 1999 (age 27)	(Slovenia) NS Mura (S1)	2025	2027
73	Efan Qiszman	(Singapore)	20 September 2006 (age 20)	(Singapore) Lion City Sailors	2026	2027
80	Dany Irfan	(Singapore)			2026	2027
Defenders
3	Tajeli Salamat	(Singapore)	7 February 1994 (age 32)	(Singapore) Geylang International	2025	2027
4	Shakir Hamzah	(Singapore)	20 October 1992 (age 34)	(Singapore) Geylang International	2026	2027
5	Danial Crichton	(Singapore) (Scotland) (Canada)	11 April 2003 (age 23)	(Singapore) Geylang International	2026	2027
15	Jun Kobayashi	(Japan)	7 May 1999 (age 27)	(Japan) FC Nobeoka Agata	2026	2027
20	Fudhil I’yadh	(Singapore)	18 August 2001 (age 25)	(Singapore) Lion City Sailors U21	2023	2027
23	Bill Mamadou	(Singapore) (Mali)	8 September 2001 (age 25)	(Thailand) Nakhon Ratchasima	2026	2027
25	Syafi Hilman	(Singapore)	27 July 2004 (age 22)	(Singapore) Young Lions	2025	2027
26	Levi Faris Alfa	(Singapore) (Nigeria)	31 May 2007 (age 19)	(Singapore) Young Lions	2025	2027
27	Firdaus Roslan	(Singapore)		(Singapore) Balestier Khalsa U21	2025	2027
28	Loukas Ng Bo Jun	(Singapore)		(Singapore) Tampines Rovers U17	2026	2027
53	Caele Kai Miles	(Singapore) (England)	29 June 2009 (age 17)	(Singapore) Geylang International U17	2026	2027
54	Aaryan Fikri	(Singapore)	5 September 2007 (age 19)	(Singapore) Lion City Sailors	2026	2027
63	Ikmal Hazlan	(Singapore)	11 January 2007 (age 19)	(Singapore) Lion City Sailors	2026	2027
65	Irfan Mika'il Abdullah	(Singapore)	11 May 2003 (age 23)	Singapore Sports School	2022	2027
70	Aqil Dany Jahsh Ruzzman	(Singapore)	20 June 2003 (age 23)	(Singapore) Lion City Sailors U21	2023	2027
81	Shaddiq Mansor	(Singapore)	20 March 2006 (age 20)	(Singapore) Tampines Rovers	2026	2027
82	Ramadhan Putera Azmi	(Singapore)	29 January 2009 (age 17)	(Singapore) Tampines Rovers U19	2026	2027
	Brayden Goh Zhong Yuan	(Singapore)	11 April 2007 (age 19)	(Singapore) Balestier Khalsa U21	2025	2026
	Saf Loqmen	(France) (Singapore)			2026	2026
Midfielders
2	Azim Akbar	(Singapore) (Pakistan)	17 December 2001 (age 24)	(Singapore) Tanjong Pagar United	2026	2027
10	Marin Kuzminski	(Croatia)	1 June 2001 (age 25)	(Croatia) Cibalia	2026	2027
12	Woo Chun Wei	(Singapore)	7 December 2004 (age 21)	(Singapore) Hougang United	2026	2027
14	Hiro Mizuguchi	(Japan)	14 January 2002 (age 24)	(Japan) Renofa Yamaguchi	2026	2027
18	Yushin Otake	(Japan)	7 July 2005 (age 21)	(Japan) Albirex Niigata	2026	2027
30	Ifat Sha'aban	(Singapore)	18 July 2001 (age 25)	(Singapore) Police SA	2025	2027
33	Ethan Henry Pinto	(Singapore)	14 October 2004 (age 22)	(Singapore) Geylang International	2026	2027
55	Danie Hafiy	(Singapore)	6 April 2004 (age 22)	(Singapore) Geylang International	2026	2027
68	Adam Faisal	(Singapore)	29 May 2007 (age 19)	(Singapore) Lion City Sailors	2026	2027
	Larry Lim Chee Keat	(Singapore)	2 July 2002 (age 24)	(Singapore) SAFSA	2022	2026
	Yanir Ben Eliezer	(Israel)	11 June 2006 (age 20)	(Singapore) Hougang United U21	2025	2026
Forwards
7	Daniel Goh	(Singapore)	13 August 1999 (age 27)	(Singapore) FC Jurong	2025	2027
17	Tin Matić	(Croatia)	23 October 1997 (age 29)	(Croatia) NK Rudeš (C2)	2025	2027
19	Zikos Vasileios Chua	(Singapore) (Greece)	15 April 2002 (age 24)	(Singapore) Tampines Rovers	2026	2027
22	Jakov Katuša	(Croatia)	29 December 2000 (age 25)	(Romania) Ceahlăul (R2)	2025	2027
24	Ilyasin Zayan	(Singapore) (England)	22 March 2004 (age 22)	(Singapore) Young Lions	2026	2027
32	Timothy Cheng	(Singapore) (England) (Hong Kong)	25 August 2005 (age 21)	(Singapore) Geylang International	2026	2027
67	Irfan Iskandar	(Singapore)	16 August 2004 (age 22)	(Singapore) Geylang International	2026	2027
77	Zamani Zamri	(Singapore)	31 May 2001 (age 25)	(Singapore) Hougang United	2026	2027
	Husnan Hassan	(Singapore)		(Singapore) Balestier Khalsa U21	2023	2026
	Harris Ilhan	(Singapore)	7 July 2007 (age 19)	(Singapore) Balestier Khalsa U21	2025	2026
	Nor Irfan	(Singapore)		(Singapore) Project Vaults	2025	2026
	Sashwin Sashi	(Singapore)		(Singapore)	2025	2026
	N.Sakthivelchezhian	(Singapore)	9 December 2002 (age 23)	(Singapore) SAFSA	2020	2026
	Shaik Fareed	(Singapore)		(Singapore)	2026	2026
	Kai Lorenz	(Singapore)		JSSL Singapore	2026	2026
	Riyyan Haziq	(Singapore)		(Singapore)	2026	2026
	Gerrardjeet Singh	(Singapore)		(Singapore) Balestier Khalsa U17	2026	2026
Players who left during season on loan
15	Lewis Lee Chih Yuan	(Singapore)	21 October 2005 (age 21)	Youth Team	2022	2023
Players who left during season permanently

Remarks:
^{FP U21} These players are registered as U21 foreign players.

=== U19 Squad ===
As of 21 February 2024

No.	Name	Nationality	Date of Birth (Age)	Previous Club	Contract Since	Contract End
Goalkeepers
1	Akmal Mirza	(Singapore)		(Singapore)	2026	2027
28	Adruce Haikel	(Singapore)		(Singapore)	2026	2027
29	Keevan Ho King Yew	(Japan)	11 June 2008 (age 18)	(Singapore) FC Jurong U19	2026	2027
Defenders
4	Luiz Guilherme Maranhao Cavalcanti	(Canada)		(Singapore)	2026	2027
5	Nazriel Khairudin	(Singapore)	1 August 2008 (age 18)	(Singapore)	2026	2027
9	Damien Lee Kee How	(Singapore)		(Singapore)	2026	2027
15	Ryan Al'fian	(Singapore)		(Singapore) Tanjong Pagar United U21	2026	2027
16	Isaac Loh Sheung Wai	(Singapore)		(Singapore)	2026	2027
26	Benjamin Yeo Hao En	(Singapore)		(Singapore)	2026	2027
Midfielders
6	Leow Yi Leh	(Singapore)		(Singapore)	2026	2027
8	Amirul Iman Farhan	(Singapore)		(Singapore)	2026	2027
10	Arfan Noor Ariff	(Singapore) (Malaysia)	21 August 2007 (age 19)	(Singapore) Balestier Khalsa	2023	2027
12	Poa Min Jun	(Singapore)		(Singapore)	2026	2027
13	Faruq Faizal	(Singapore)		(Singapore)	2026	2027
15	Syed Rayn Al'fian	(Singapore)		(Singapore)	2026	2027
18	Noah Li-Sheng De Lang-Ho	(Singapore)		(Singapore)	2026	2027
27	Luca Joanny	(Singapore)		(Singapore) Geylang International U17	2026	2027
Strikers
7	Ryunosuke Alex Iwanaga	(Japan) (Nigeria)	28 September 2008 (age 18)	(Singapore) FC Jurong U19	2026	2027
9	Damien Lee Kee How	(Singapore)		(Singapore)	2026	2027
11	Areial Zahazad	(Singapore)		(Singapore)	2026	2027
19	Ajay Fernandes	(Singapore)		(Singapore)	2026	2027
Players who left during season permanently

=== Women ===
No.	Name	Nationality	Date of Birth (Age)	Previous Club	Contract Since	Contract End
Goalkeepers
1	Adra Nur Qaisara Binte Mohamed Faiz	(Singapore)	10 September 2010 (age 16)	(Singapore) Meridian Secondary School	2026	2026
25	Syifaa Nurdianah	(Singapore)		(Singapore)	2026	2026
Defenders
2	Nur Insyirah	(Singapore)			2026	2026
4	Siti Nur Aishah	(Singapore)			2026	2026
5	Vafa Dhabitah	(Singapore)	2 April 2010 (age 16)		2025	2026
6	Iffah	(Singapore)			2025	2026
19	Nurshamirah Norshaidi	(Singapore)		(Singapore)	2026	2026
20	Bernice Ong	(Singapore)		(Singapore)	2026	2026
	Shareen Qistina	(Singapore)			2026	2026
Midfielders
10	Hannah Teo	(Malaysia)			2025	2026
13	Laura Tatiana Zamri	(Singapore)		(Singapore) Geylang International	2026	2026
14	Dini Aleeya	(Singapore)		(Singapore)	2026	2026
15	Yumi Ng	(Singapore)		(Singapore)	2026	2026
17	Sofea Ayu	(Singapore)	6 March 2011 (age 15)	(Singapore) Lion City Sailors Academy	2026	2026
22	Alia Ming Ballout	(Singapore)		(Singapore)	2026	2026
	Julia Michalski	(United States)			2026	2026
Strikers
7	Svea Hertzman	(Singapore) (Sweden)	26 August 2010 (age 16)	(Singapore) Geylang International	2026	2026
9	Maidah Mahboob	(Singapore)			2026	2026
12	Sharifah Amanina	(Singapore)	8 January 2008 (age 18)		2025	2026
24	Dinah Sajida	(Singapore)		(Singapore) French Football Academy	2025	2026
	Ariel Isabelle Mahachai	(Singapore)			2026	2026
Players who left after 2025 season
	Talia Sachet	(Singapore) (France)	10 July 2009 (age 17)	(Singapore) Mattar Sailors Women	2025	2025
8	Daniyah	(Singapore)			2025	2025
9	Lyla Wines-Winch	(Australia)			2025	2025
19	Erlya	(Singapore)			2025	2025
21	Laura Rivellini	(France)			2025	2025
26	Noraqilah	(Singapore)			2025	2025
	Noordiyanah Norazhar	(Singapore)			2025	2025
	Anica Danielle Alde Cabuay	(Philippines)			2025	2025

== Coaching staff ==
Management Team

Position	Name
Chairman	(Singapore) S. Thavaneson
CEO	(Singapore) Navin Nambiar
Sporting Director	
Technical Director	
General Manager	Tim Nee Cheng

First Team

Position	Name	Ref.
Team Manager	(Indonesia) Budiyanto Nanto	
Head Coach	(Croatia) Marko Kraljević	
Assistant & Fitness Coach	(Singapore) Donald Wan	
Assistant Coach	(Singapore)	
Goalkeeping Coach	(Singapore)	
Coach	(Singapore) Deon Lim	
Physiotherapist		
Kitman	(Singapore)	
Video Analyst	(Singapore) Shaun Tan	

Youth and Women Team

Position	Name	Ref.
Head Coach (Women)	(Singapore) Stephen Rajah (till Dec 2024) (Singapore) Farhan Farook (till Jan 2025)	
Head of Youth Development		
SPL2 Coach	(Singapore) Donald Wan	
U19 Coach	(Singapore) Shaun Tan	
U17 Coach	(Singapore) Ali Imran Lomri	
U15 Coach	(Singapore) Hadi Othman	
U14 Coach	(Singapore) Jonathan Xu (Singapore) (China) Qiu Li	
U13 Coach	(England) Mark Siddle	

== Transfer ==
=== In ===
Pre-Season

Date (Note: Date of club's announcement, will be either date of club announcement or 1 Jun-2025, the date which the free agent start due to lapse of previous contract)	Position	Player	Transferred from	Ref
First team
31 May 2026	DF	(Singapore) (Nigeria) Levi Faris Alfa	(Singapore) Young Lions	End of loan
1 July 2026	GK	(Singapore) Efan Qiszman	(Singapore) Lion City Sailors	Free
1 July 2026	DF	(Singapore) Ikmal Hazlan	(Singapore) Lion City Sailors	Free
1 July 2026	DF	(Singapore) Aaryan Fikri	(Singapore) Lion City Sailors	Free
1 July 2026	DF	(Singapore) Shaddiq Mansor	(Singapore) Tampines Rovers	Free
1 July 2026	DF	(Singapore) Ramadhan Putera Azmi	(Singapore) Tampines Rovers	Free
1 July 2026	DF	(Singapore) Shakir Hamzah	(Singapore) Geylang International	Free
1 July 2026	MF	(Singapore) Danie Hafiy	(Singapore) Lion City Sailors	Free
1 July 2026	FW	(Singapore) Ilyasin Zayan	(Singapore) Lion City Sailors	Free
1 July 2026	FW	(Japan) (Nigeria) Ryunosuke Alex Iwanaga	(Singapore) FC Jurong	Free
1 July 2026	FW	(Singapore) Adam Faisal	(Singapore) Lion City Sailors	Free
21 August 2026	MF	(Japan) Yushin Otake	(Japan) Albirex Niigata (J2)	Season loan
22 August 2026	DF	(Singapore) (Mali) Bill Mamadou	(Thailand) Nakhon Ratchasima	Free
22 August 2026	MF	(Croatia) Marin Kuzminski	(Croatia) Cibalia (C2)	Free
23 August 2026	MF	(Japan) Hiro Mizuguchi	(Japan) Renofa Yamaguchi (J3)	Free
24 August 2026	DF	(Japan) Jun Kobayashi	(Japan) FC Nobeoka Agata (J5)	Free
8 September 2026	DF	(Singapore) (Scotland) (Canada) Danial Crichton	(Singapore) Geylang International	Free
8 September 2026	MF	(Singapore) (Pakistan) Azim Akbar	(Singapore) Tanjong Pagar United	Free
8 September 2026	MF	(Singapore) Woo Chun Wei	(Singapore) Hougang United	Free
8 September 2026	FW	(Singapore) (Greece) Zikos Chua	(Singapore) Tampines Rovers	Free
9 September 2026	MF	(Singapore) Ethan Henry Pinto	(Singapore) Geylang International	Free
9 September 2026	FW	(England) (Singapore) (Hong Kong) Timothy Cheng	(Singapore) Geylang International	Free
Academy

Mid-Season

Date (Note: Date of club's announcement, will be either date of club announcement or 1 Jun-2025, the date which the free agent start due to lapse of previous contract)	Position	Player	Transferred from	Ref
First team
Academy

=== Out ===
Preseason

Date (Note: Date of club's announcement, will be either date of club announcement or 1 Jun-2025, the date which the free agent start due to lapse of previous contract)	Position	Player	Transferred To	Ref
First team
31 May 2026	DF	(Singapore) Aniq Raushan	(Singapore) Lion City Sailors	End of loan
31 May 2026	MF	(Israel) Yanir Ben Eliezer	(Singapore) Hougang United	Free
31 May 2026	MF	(Portugal) Tiago Martins	(Singapore) Lion City Sailors U21	End of loan
31 May 2026	FW	(Singapore) (England) Ilyasin Zayan	(Singapore) Lion City Sailors	End of loan
22 June 2026	DF	(Singapore) Darren Teh	(Singapore) Geylang International	Free
22 June 2026	DF	(Singapore) Harith Kanadi	(Singapore) Geylang International	Free
22 June 2026	MF	(Japan) Masahiro Sugita	(Singapore) Tanjong Pagar United	Free
23 June 2026	GK	(Singapore) Martyn Mun	Retired	N.A.
23 June 2026	MF	(Serbia) Lazar Vujanić	(Singapore) Tanjong Pagar United	Free
23 June 2026	MF	(Singapore) Elijah Lim	(Singapore)	Free
30 June 2026	GK	(Singapore) Zico Law	(Singapore)	Free
30 June 2026	DF	(Singapore) Anyyq Yaqyn	(Singapore)	Free
30 June 2026	DF	(Singapore) Syabil Hisham	(Singapore) Geylang International	Free
30 June 2026	DF	(Singapore) Deshan Gunasegara	(Singapore) Tanjong Pagar United	Free
30 June 2026	DF	(Singapore) Daniyal Lynn Rasor	(Singapore) Tanjong Pagar United	Free
30 June 2026	MF	(Singapore) Adly Irfan	(Singapore) Tanjong Pagar United	Free
30 June 2026	MF	(Australia) Hugh Alexander Lobsey	(Singapore) Lion City Sailors	Free
30 June 2026	MF	(Malaysia) Lin Ze Hao	(Singapore) Hougang United	Free
30 June 2026	FW	(Serbia) Bogdan Mandić	(Greece)	Free
1 July 2026	DF	(Croatia) Mario Subarić	(Croatia)	Free
3 July 2026	MF	(Singapore) Ignatius Ang	(Singapore)	Free
12 August 2026	DF	(Singapore) Madhu Mohana	(Singapore) Tanjong Pagar United	Free
SPL2, U23 & Academy
15 May 2026	DF	(France) (Singapore) Saf Loqmen	(Singapore)	Free
15 May 2026	MF	(Singapore) Larry Lim	(Singapore)	Free
15 May 2026	MF	(Singapore) Nor Irfan	(Singapore) Jungfrau Punggol	Free
15 May 2026	FW	(Singapore) N.Sakthivelchezhian	(Singapore)	Free
15 May 2026	FW	(Singapore) Karthigaya Varmaan	(Singapore) Gymkhana FC	Free
FW	(Singapore) Sashwin Sashi	(Singapore)	Free	

Mid-season

Date (Note: Date of club's announcement, will be either date of club announcement or 1 Jun-2025, the date which the free agent start due to lapse of previous contract)	Position	Player	Transferred To	Ref
First team
SPL2, U23 & Academy

=== National Services ===
Preseason

Date (Note: Date of club's announcement, else will be 1 Jun-2025, the date which the free agent start due to lapse of previous contract)	Position	Player	Transferred To	Ref
First team
U23
2 January 2024	MF	(Singapore) Lewis Lee Chih Yuan	(Singapore) SAFSA	NS till Jan 2026

=== Retained / Extension / Promoted ===
Date	Position	Player	Ref
First team
1 July 2026	GK	(Singapore) Hafiz Ahmad	1-year contract till Jun 2027
1 July 2026	GK	(Croatia) Mario Mustapić	1-year contract till Jun 2027
1 July 2026	DF	(Singapore) Fudhil I’yadh	1-year contract till Jun 2027
1 July 2026	DF	(Singapore) Tajeli Salamat	1-year contract till Jun 2027
1 July 2026	DF	(Singapore) Syafi Hilman	1-year contract till Jun 2027
1 July 2026	DF	(Singapore) Irfan Mika'il Abdullah	1-year contract till Jun 2027
1 July 2026	MF	(Malaysia) Arfan Noor Ariff	1-year contract till Jun 2027
1 July 2026	FW	(Singapore) Daniel Goh	1-year contract till Jun 2027
1 July 2026	FW	(Singapore) Irfan Iskandar	1-year contract till Jun 2027
1 July 2026	FW	(Singapore) Zamani Zamri	1-year contract till Jun 2027
1 July 2026	FW	(Singapore) Ifat Sha'aban	1-year contract till Jun 2027
1 July 2026	FW	(Croatia) Jakov Katuša	1-year contract till Jun 2027
1 July 2026	FW	(Croatia) Tin Matić	1-year contract till Jun 2027

== Friendly ==
=== Pre-season ===
Win Draw Loss

20 August 2026 1	Tanjong Pagar United (Singapore)	1–1	(Singapore) Balestier Khalsa	Jurong East
	Taufik Suparno 66'			Stadium: Jurong East Stadium

30 August 2026 2	Balestier Khalsa (Singapore)	1–1	(Singapore) Hougang United	Bedok
	55'	Report	Khairin Nadim 60'	Stadium: Bedok Stadium

== Team statistics ==
=== Appearances and goals ===
As of 20 Nov 2026

No.	Pos.	Player	SPL		Singapore Cup		Total	
No.	Pos.	Player	Apps.	Goals	Apps.	Goals	Apps.	Goals
2	MF	(Singapore) (Pakistan) Azim Akbar	6+1	0	0	0	7	0
3	DF	(Singapore) Tajeli Salamat	7	0	0	0	7	0
4	DF	(Singapore) Shakir Hamzah	0	0	0	0	0	0
5	DF	(Canada) (Singapore) Danial Crichton	0+1	0	0	0	1	0
7	FW	(Singapore) Daniel Goh	7	2	0	0	7	2
10	MF	(Croatia) Marin Kuzminski	7	2	0	0	7	2
12	MF	(Singapore) Woo Chun Wei	4+2	0	0	0	6	0
14	MF	(Japan) Hiro Mizuguchi	7	1	0	0	7	1
15	DF	(Japan) Jun Kobayashi	0	0	0	0	0	0
17	FW	(Croatia) Tin Matić	7	2	0	0	7	2
18	MF	(Japan) Yushin Otake	7	0	0	0	7	0
19	FW	(Singapore) (Greece) Zikos Chua	0+3	0	0	0	3	0
20	DF	(Singapore) Fudhil I’yadh	5+1	0	0	0	6	0
21	GK	(Singapore) Hafiz Ahmad	0	0	0	0	0	0
22	FW	(Croatia) Jakov Katuša	7	1	0	0	7	1
23	DF	(Singapore) (Mali) Bill Mamadou	3	0	0	0	3	0
24	FW	(Singapore) (England) Ilyasin Zayan	0+4	0	0	0	4	0
25	DF	(Singapore) Syafi Hilman	3+3	0	0	0	6	0
30	FW	(Singapore) Ifat Sha'aban	0	0	0	0	0	0
32	FW	(Singapore) (Hong Kong) Timothy Cheng	0+5	0	0	0	5	0
33	MF	(Singapore) Ethan Henry Pinto	0+1	0	0	0	1	0
55	MF	(Singapore) Danie Hafiy	0	0	0	0	0	0
63	DF	(Singapore) Ikmal Hazlan	0+4	0	0	0	4	0
65	DF	(Singapore) Irfan Mika'il Abdullah	0+1	0	0	0	1	0
68	MF	(Singapore) Adam Faisal	0	0	0	0	0	0
71	GK	(Croatia) Mario Mustapić	7	0	0	0	7	0
77	FW	(Singapore) Zamani Zamri	0	0	0	0	0	0
Players who have played this season but had left the club or on loan to other club

== Competitions ==
=== Singapore Premier League ===
Win Draw Loss

11 September 2026 1	Tampines Rovers (Singapore)	2–0	(Singapore) Balestier Khalsa	Tampines
	Tajeli Salamat 29' (o.g.); Hide Higashikawa 86'; Shah Shahiran (yellow card) 67'	Report	Daniel Goh (yellow card) 41'; Fudhil I’yadh (yellow card) 69'	Stadium: Our Tampines Hub; Referee: Muhammad Taqi; Man of the Match: (Japan) Hide Higashikawa

19 September 2026 2	Balestier Khalsa (Singapore)	3–4	(Singapore) Tanjong Pagar United	Bishan
	Bill Mamadou 7' (red card) 15'; Tin Matic 88'; Marin Kuzminski 90+1'; Jakov Katuša (yellow card) 27'; Fudhil I’yadh (yellow card) 38' (yellow-red card) 85'; Hiro Mizuguchi (yellow card) 90+12'		Yuki Aizu 35'; Lazar Vujanić 50', 56'; Boris Kopitović 90+13' (pen.); Alex Masogo (yellow card) 45+4'; Jared Gallagher (red card) 77'	Stadium: Bishan Stadium; Referee: Mazlan Pagira; Man of the Match: (Croatia) Lazar Vujanić

12 October 2026 3	Hougang United (Singapore)	1–2	(Singapore) Balestier Khalsa	Bishan
	Lucas Cardoso 29' (yellow card) 62'; Khairin Nadim (yellow card) 32' (yellow-red card) 84'; Amir Syafiz (yellow card) 35'; Huzaifah Aziz (red card) 41'		Marin Kuzminski 8'; Jakov Katuša 11'; Syafi Hilman (yellow card) 45+9'; Woo Chun Wei (yellow card) 57'	Stadium: Bishan Stadium; Referee: Syarqawi Buhairi; Man of the Match: (Japan) Takahiro Koga

17 October 2026 4	Balestier Khalsa (Singapore)	0–0	(Singapore) Geylang International	Bishan
			Dejan Račić (yellow card) 74'; Darren Teh (yellow card) 77'	Stadium: Bishan Stadium; Referee: Taufik Thana; Man of the Match: (Croatia) Mario Mustapić

24 October 2026 5	Young Lions (Singapore)	1–2	(Singapore) Balestier Khalsa	Jalan Besar
	Shuya Yamashita 45+4'; Iryan Fandi (yellow card) 45+7'; Ajay Robson (yellow card) 66'; Andy Reefqy (yellow card) 90+9'		Tin Matic 5'; Hiro Mizuguchi 22'; Woo Chun Wei (yellow card) 30'; Tajeli Salamat (yellow card) 38'	Stadium: Jalan Besar Stadium; Referee: Khairul Amri; Man of the Match: (Croatia) Jakov Katuša

1 November 2026 6	Balestier Khalsa (Singapore)	0–4	(Singapore) Lion City Sailors	Bishan
	Yushin Otake (yellow card) 65'; Syafi Hilman (yellow card) 82'		Shawal Anuar 31'; Antonio Mance 37' (pen.); Matthias Phaëton 80'; Lennart Thy 85'	Stadium: Bishan Stadium; Referee: Clarence Leow; Man of the Match: (Singapore) Farhan Zulkifli

20 November 2026 7	FC Jurong (Singapore)	3–2	(Singapore) Balestier Khalsa	Jurong East
	Seo Seung-woo 31'; Lee Jae-yong 53'; Kodai Dohi 74'; Akram Azman (yellow card) 49'	Report	Daniel Goh 34', 70'; Yushin Otake (yellow card) 27'; Bill Mamadou (yellow card) 32'; Tajeli Salamat (yellow card) 76'; Marin Kuzminski (yellow card) 77'	Stadium: Jurong East Stadium; Referee: Jansen Foo; Man of the Match: (Japan) Kodai Dohi

28 November 2026 8	Balestier Khalsa (Singapore)	–	(Singapore) Hougang United	Bishan
				Stadium: Bishan Stadium

12 February 2027 9	Tanjong Pagar United (Singapore)	–	(Singapore) Balestier Khalsa	Jurong East
				Stadium: Jurong East Stadium

21 February 2027 10	Balestier Khalsa (Singapore)	–	(Singapore) Lion City Sailors	Bishan
				Stadium: Bishan Stadium

27 February 2027 11	Young Lions (Singapore)	–	(Singapore) Balestier Khalsa	Jalan Besar
				Stadium: Jalan Besar Stadium

5 March 2027 12	Balestier Khalsa (Singapore)	–	(Singapore) Geylang International	Bishan
				Stadium: Bishan Stadium

14 March 2027 13	Balestier Khalsa (Singapore)	–	(Singapore) Tampines Rovers	Bishan
				Stadium: Bishan Stadium

22 January 2027 14 (Rescheduled)	FC Jurong (Singapore)	–	(Singapore) Balestier Khalsa	Jurong East
				Stadium: Jurong East Stadium

3 April 2027 15	Balestier Khalsa (Singapore)	–	(Singapore) Young Lions	Bishan
				Stadium: Bishan Stadium

30 January 2027 16 (Rescheduled)	Geylang International (Singapore)	–	(Singapore) Balestier Khalsa	Tampines
				Stadium: Our Tampines Hub

16 April 2027 17	Balestier Khalsa (Singapore)	–	(Singapore) Tanjong Pagar United	Bishan
				Stadium: Bishan Stadium

25 April 2027 18	Hougang United (Singapore)	–	(Singapore) Balestier Khalsa	Bishan
				Stadium: Bishan Stadium

2 May 2027 19	Balestier Khalsa (Singapore)	–	(Singapore) FC Jurong	Bishan
				Stadium: Bishan Stadium

9 May 2027 20	Lion City Sailors (Singapore)	–	(Singapore) Balestier Khalsa	Jalan Besar
				Stadium: Jalan Besar Stadium

15 May 2027 21	Tampines Rovers (Singapore)	–	(Singapore) Balestier Khalsa	Tampines
				Stadium: Our Tampines Hub

Pos	Team	Pld	W	D	L	GF	GA	GD	Pts
1	Geylang International	6	4	2	0	12	2	+10	14
2	Lion City Sailors	5	4	1	0	20	3	+17	13
3	Tampines Rovers	5	4	1	0	13	3	+10	13
4	FC Jurong	7	3	1	3	14	11	+3	10
5	Balestier Khalsa	7	2	1	4	9	15	−6	7
6	Tanjong Pagar United	6	2	1	3	7	16	−9	7
7	Young Lions (Note: Young Lions are not eligible to represent Singapore in AFC club competitions.)	6	1	0	5	6	21	−15	3
8	Hougang United	6	0	1	5	4	14	−10	1

Updated to match(es) played on 20 November 2026. Source: Singapore Premier League
Rules for classification: 1) Points; 2) goal difference; 3) goals scored; 4) wins

== Competition (SPL2) ==
Win Draw Loss

25 August 2026 1	Balestier Khalsa (Singapore)	2–1	(Singapore) Geylang International	Tampines
	Alessandro Lura 44' (o.g.); Timothy Cheng 70' (pen.); Irfan Mika'il (yellow card) 11'; Danial Scott Crichton (yellow card) 72'; Shaddiq Mansor (yellow card) 76'		Harith Kanadi 13'; Ryoya Taniguchi (yellow card) 90+3'	Stadium: Our Tampines Hub

29 August 2026 2	Young Lions (Singapore)	2–0	(Singapore) Balestier Khalsa	Bukit Gombak
	Nathan Mao 45' (yellow card) 67'; Toi Kagami 90'; Garv Sahoo (yellow card) 33'; Erdy Taha (yellow card) 52'		Shaddiq Mansor (yellow card) 90+3'	Stadium: Bukit Gombak Stadium

2 September 2026 3	Balestier Khalsa (Singapore)	1–1	(Singapore) Hougang United	Bedok
	Danial Crichton 71' (yellow card) 89'; Woo Chun Wei (yellow card) 15'; Irfan Mika'il (yellow card) 57'	Report	Wong Ngaang Haang 54'; Lin Ze Hao (yellow card) 15'	Stadium: Bedok Stadium

7 September 2026 4	Balestier Khalsa (Singapore)	2–1	(Singapore) Tanjong Pagar United	Jurong East
	Syafi Hilman 62'; Adam Faisal 64'			Stadium: Jurong East Stadium

19 October 2026 5	Lion City Sailors (Singapore)	1–3	(Singapore) Balestier Khalsa	Bedok
			Danie Hafiy 40'; Zikos Chua 81' (pen.); Ethan Pinto 82'	Stadium: Bedok Stadium

6 November 2026 6	Balestier Khalsa (Singapore)	2–1	(Singapore) Tampines Rovers	Bedok
	Ikmal Hazlan 28'; Zikos Chua 87'			Stadium: Bedok Stadium

6 December 2026 7	FC Jurong (Singapore)	–	(Singapore) Balestier Khalsa	Jurong East
				Stadium: Jurong East Stadium

12 December 2026 8	Geylang International (Singapore)	–	(Singapore) Balestier Khalsa	Bedok
				Stadium: Bedok Stadium

16 December 2026 9	Balestier Khalsa (Singapore)	–	(Singapore) Young Lions	Bishan
				Stadium: Bishan Stadium

20 December 2026 10	Hougang United (Singapore)	–	(Singapore) Balestier Khalsa	Tampines
				Stadium: Our Tampines Hub

5 January 2027 11	Tanjong Pagar United (Singapore)	–	(Singapore) Balestier Khalsa	Jurong East
				Stadium: Jurong East Stadium

8 January 2027 12	Balestier Khalsa (Singapore)	–	(Singapore) Lion City Sailors	Bishan
				Stadium: Bishan Stadium

12 January 2027 13	Tampines Rovers (Singapore)	–	(Singapore) Balestier Khalsa	Tampines
				Stadium: Our Tampines Hub

16 January 2027 14	Balestier Khalsa (Singapore)	–	(Singapore) FC Jurong	Bishan
				Stadium: Bishan Stadium

20 January 2027 15	Balestier Khalsa (Singapore)	–	(Singapore) Geylang International	Bedok
				Stadium: Bedok Stadium

24 January 2027 16	Young Lions (Singapore)	–	(Singapore) Balestier Khalsa	Bishan
				Stadium: Bishan Stadium

30 January 2027 17	Balestier Khalsa (Singapore)	–	(Singapore) Hougang United	Bishan
				Stadium: Bishan Stadium

3 February 2027 18	Tanjong Pagar United (Singapore)	–	(Singapore) Balestier Khalsa	Jurong East
				Stadium: Jurong East Stadium

22 February 2027 19	Lion City Sailors (Singapore)	–	(Singapore) Balestier Khalsa	Tampines
				Stadium: Our Tampines Hub

1 March 2027 20	Balestier Khalsa (Singapore)	–	(Singapore) Tampines Rovers	Tampines
				Stadium: Our Tampines Hub

5 April 2027 21	Balestier Khalsa (Singapore)	–	(Singapore) FC Jurong	Jurong East
				Stadium: Jurong East Stadium

Pos	Team	Pld	W	D	L	GF	GA	GD	Pts	Qualification or relegation
1	Geylang International II	6	5	0	1	19	2	+17	15	Champion
2	Balestier Khalsa II	6	4	1	1	10	7	+3	13	
3	Tampines Rovers II	5	4	0	1	18	5	+13	12	
4	Young Lions B	3	2	0	1	10	7	+3	6	
5	FC Jurong II	5	1	1	3	11	12	−1	4	
6	Hougang United II	5	1	1	3	5	13	−8	4	
7	Tanjong Pagar United II	6	1	1	4	8	24	−16	4	
8	Lion City Sailors II	6	1	0	5	7	18	−11	3	

First match(es) will be played: 6 November 2026. Source: Singapore Premier League 2
Rules for classification: 1) points; 2) goal difference; 3) number of goals scored; 4) number of wins
