= 2025–26 Balestier Khalsa FC season =

Balestier Khalsa
2025–26 season
- Chairman: S Thavaneson
- Stadium: Bishan Stadium
Home colours	Away colours

The 2025–26 season is Balestier Khalsa's 30th consecutive season in the top flight of Singapore football and in the Singapore Premier League and the Singapore Cup.

== Squad ==
=== Singapore Premier League ===
As of 21 February 2024

No.	Name	Nationality	Date of Birth (Age)	Previous Club	Contract Since	Contract End
Goalkeepers
16	Martyn Mun	(Singapore)	7 January 2000 (age 26)	(Singapore) Young Lions	2020	2026
21	Hafiz Ahmad	(Singapore)	30 December 1998 (age 27)	(Singapore) Geylang International	2024	2026
38	Zico Law	(Singapore)	21 June 2005 (age 21)	(Singapore) Balestier Khalsa U21	2024	2026
71	Mario Mustapić	(Croatia)	22 October 1999 (age 27)	(Slovenia) NS Mura (S1)	2025	2026
80	Dany Irfan	(Singapore)			2026	2026
Defenders
2	Darren Teh	(Singapore)	9 September 1996 (age 30)	(Singapore) Geylang International	2022	2026
3	Tajeli Salamat	(Singapore)	7 February 1994 (age 32)	(Singapore) Geylang International	2025	2026
4	Syabil Hisham	(Singapore)	20 September 2002 (age 24)	(Singapore) SAFSA	2025	2026
5	Mario Subarić	(Croatia)	22 February 2000 (age 26)	(Slovenia) NK Aluminij (S2)	2025	2026
6	Madhu Mohana	(Singapore)	6 March 1991 (age 35)	(Singapore) Tampines Rovers	2022	2026
11	Harith Kanadi	(Singapore)	1 August 2000 (age 26)	(Singapore) Lion City Sailors	2024	2026
20	Fudhil I’yadh	(Singapore)	18 August 2001 (age 25)	(Singapore) Lion City Sailors U21	2023	2026
25	Aniq Raushan	(Singapore)	5 October 2003 (age 23)	(Singapore) Young Lions	2026	2026
32	Syafi Hilman	(Singapore)	27 July 2004 (age 22)	(Singapore) Young Lions	2025	2026
46	Anyyq Yaqyn	(Singapore)			2025	2026
48	Firdaus Roslan	(Singapore)		(Singapore) Balestier Khalsa U21	2025	2026
49	Deshan Gunasegara	(Malaysia) (Singapore)		(Singapore) Hougang United U17	2025	2026
55	Brayden Goh Zhong Yuan	(Singapore)	11 April 2007 (age 19)	(Singapore) Balestier Khalsa U21	2025	2026
63	Loukas Ng Bo Jun	(Singapore)		(Singapore) BG Tampines Rovers U17	2026	2026
66	Aqil Dany Jahsh Ruzzman	(Singapore)	20 June 2003 (age 23)	(Singapore) Lion City Sailors U21	2023	2026
68	Saf Loqmen	(France) (Singapore)			2026	2026
73	Daniyal Lynn Rasor	(Singapore)	7 January 2004 (age 22)	(Japan) Albirex Niigata (S) U21	2025	2026
Midfielders
7	Lazar Vujanić	(Serbia)	18 September 1999 (age 27)	(Croatia) Bijelo Brdo (C2)	2025	2026
14	Elijah Lim Teck Yong	(Singapore)	8 May 2001 (age 25)	(Singapore) Young Lions	2023	2026
18	Masahiro Sugita	(Japan)	24 November 1999 (age 26)	(Japan) Albirex Niigata (S)	2023	2026
19	Tiago Martins	(Portugal)	8 February 2005 (age 21)	(Singapore) Lion City Sailors U21	2025	2026
27	Yanir Ben Eliezer	(Israel)	11 June 2006 (age 20)	(Singapore) Hougang United U21	2025	2026
30	Ignatius Ang	(Singapore)	12 November 1992 (age 34)	(Singapore) Tanjong Pagar United	2022	2026
41	Hugh Alexander Lobsey	(Australia) (Singapore)		(Singapore) BG Tampines Rovers U17	2026	2026
51	Adly Irfan	(Singapore)		(Singapore) Geylang International U21	2025	2026
56	Lin Ze Hao	(Malaysia)	26 January 2007 (age 19)	(Singapore) Balestier Khalsa U21	2025	2026
57	Arfan Noor Ariff	(Singapore) (Malaysia)	21 August 2007 (age 19)	(Singapore) Balestier Khalsa U21	2023	2026
64	Larry Lim Chee Keat	(Singapore)	2 July 2002 (age 24)	(Singapore) SAFSA	2022	2026
74	Ifat Sha'aban	(Singapore)	18 July 2001 (age 25)	(Singapore) Police SA	2025	2026
Forwards
9	Bogdan Mandić	(Serbia)	1 September 1998 (age 28)	(Greece) Panargiakos (G2)	2025	2026
13	Daniel Goh	(Singapore)	13 August 1999 (age 27)	(Japan) Albirex Niigata (S)	2025	2026
17	Tin Matić	(Croatia)	23 October 1997 (age 29)	(Croatia) NK Rudeš (C2)	2025	2026
22	Jakov Katuša	(Croatia)	29 December 2000 (age 25)	(Romania) Ceahlăul (R2)	2025	2026
24	N.Sakthivelchezhian	(Singapore)	9 December 2002 (age 23)	(Singapore) SAFSA	2020	2026
26	Ilyasin Zayan	(Singapore) (England)	22 March 2004 (age 22)	(Singapore) Young Lions	2026	2026
50	Husnan Hassan	(Singapore)		(Singapore) Balestier Khalsa U21	2023	2026
52	Harris Ilhan	(Singapore)	7 July 2007 (age 19)	(Singapore) Balestier Khalsa U21	2025	2026
59	Nor Irfan	(Singapore)		(Singapore) Project Vaults	2025	2026
67	Irfan Iskandar	(Singapore)	16 August 2004 (age 22)	(Singapore) Geylang International	2026	2026
70	Karthigaya Varmaan	(Singapore)		(Singapore)	2025	2026
72	Sashwin Sashi	(Singapore)		(Singapore)	2025	2026
77	Zamani Zamri	(Singapore)	31 May 2001 (age 25)	(Singapore) Hougang United	2026	2026
	Shaik Fareed	(Singapore)		(Singapore)	2026	2026
	Kai Lorenz	(Singapore)		JSSL Singapore	2026	2026
	Riyyan Haziq	(Singapore)		(Singapore)	2026	2026
	Gerrardjeet Singh	(Singapore)		(Singapore) Balestier Khalsa U17	2026	2026
Players who left during season on loan
15	Lewis Lee Chih Yuan	(Singapore)	21 October 2005 (age 21)	Youth Team	2022	2023
23	Levi Faris Alfa	(Singapore) (Nigeria)	31 May 2007 (age 19)	(Singapore) Hougang United U21	2025	2026
Players who left during season permanently
36	Abdil Qaiyyim Mutalib	(Singapore)	14 May 1989 (age 37)	(Singapore) Hougang United	2025	2026
47	Rijan Rai	(Singapore) (Nepal)		(Singapore) Hougang United U21	2025	2026
54	Wong Ngang Haang	(Singapore)	3 March 2004 (age 22)	(Singapore) Young Lions	2025	2026
60	Jeff Lam	(Singapore)	18 years old		2025	2026

Remarks:
^{FP U21} These players are registered as U21 foreign players.

=== Women ===
No.	Name	Nationality	Date of Birth (Age)	Previous Club	Contract Since	Contract End
Goalkeepers
1	Adra Nur Qaisara	(Singapore)		(Singapore) Meridian Secondary School	2026	2026
25	Syifaa Nurdianah	(Singapore)		(Singapore)	2026	2026
Defenders
2	Nur Insyirah	(Singapore)			2026	2026
4	Siti Nur Aishah	(Singapore)			2026	2026
5	Vafa Dabhitah	(Singapore)			2025	2026
6	Iffah	(Singapore)			2025	2026
19	Nurshamirah Norshaidi	(Singapore)		(Singapore)	2026	2026
20	Bernice Ong	(Singapore)		(Singapore)	2026	2026
	Shareen Qistina	(Singapore)			2026	2026
Midfielders
10	Hannah Teo	(Malaysia)			2025	2026
13	Laura Tatiana Zamri	(Singapore)		(Singapore) Geylang International	2026	2026
14	Dini Aleeya	(Singapore)		(Singapore)	2026	2026
15	Yumi Ng	(Singapore)		(Singapore)	2026	2026
17	Sofea Ayu	(Singapore)	06 March 2011 (age 14)	(Singapore) Lion City Sailors Academy	2026	2026
22	Alia Ming Ballout	(Singapore)		(Singapore)	2026	2026
	Julia Michalski	(United States)			2026	2026
Strikers
7	Svea Hertzman	(Singapore) (Sweden)	26 August 2010 (age 16)	(Singapore) Geylang International	2026	2026
9	Maidah Mahboob	(Singapore)			2026	2026
12	Sharifah Amanina	(Singapore)	8 January 2008 (age 18)		2025	2026
24	Dinah Sajida	(Singapore)		(Singapore) French Football Academy	2025	2026
	Ariel Isabelle Mahachai	(Singapore)			2026	2026
Players who left after 2025 season
	Talia Sachet	(Singapore) (France)	10 July 2009 (age 17)	(Singapore) Mattar Sailors Women	2025	2025
8	Daniyah	(Singapore)			2025	2025
9	Lyla Wines-Winch	(Australia)			2025	2025
19	Erlya	(Singapore)			2025	2025
21	Laura Rivellini	(France)			2025	2025
26	Noraqilah	(Singapore)			2025	2025
	Noordiyanah Norazhar	(Singapore)			2025	2025
	Anica Danielle Alde Cabuay	(Philippines)			2025	2025

== Coaching staff ==
First Team

Position	Name	Ref.
Team Manager		
General Manager	Tim Nee Cheng	
Head Coach	(Croatia) Marko Kraljević	
Assistant & Fitness Coach	(Singapore) Donald Wan	
Assistant Coach	(Singapore) Shaun Tan	
Goalkeeping Coach	(Singapore) Ng Wei Xian	
Coach	(Indonesia) Budiyanto Nanto	
Physiotherapist		
Kitman	(Singapore)	
Video Analyst	(Singapore) Shaun Tan	

Youth and Women Team

Position	Name	Ref.
Head Coach (Women)	(Singapore) Stephen Rajah (till Dec 2024) (Singapore) Farhan Farook (till Jan 2025)	
Head of Youth Development		
SPL2 Coach	(Singapore) Donald Wan	
U19 Coach	(Singapore) Shaun Tan	
U17 Coach	(Singapore) Ali Imran Lomri	
U15 Coach	(Singapore) Hadi Othman	
U14 Coach	(Singapore) Jonathan Xu (Singapore) (China) Qiu Li	
U13 Coach	(England) Mark Siddle	

== Transfer ==
=== In ===
Pre-Season

Date (Note: Date of club's announcement, will be either date of club announcement or 1 Jun-2025, the date which the free agent start due to lapse of previous contract)	Position	Player	Transferred from	Ref
First team
13 July 2025	DF	(Croatia) Mario Subarić	(Slovenia) NK Aluminij (S1)	Free
14 July 2025	MF	(Serbia) Lazar Vujanić	(Croatia) NK BSK Bijelo Brdo (C2)	Free
15 July 2025	FW	(Croatia) Tin Matić	(Croatia) NK Rudeš (C2)	Free
16 July 2025	FW	(Serbia) Bogdan Mandić	(Greece) Panargiakos (G2)	Free
19 July 2025	FW	(Singapore) Daniel Goh	(Japan) Albirex Niigata (S)	Free
26 July 2025	GK	(Croatia) Mario Mustapić	(Slovenia) NS Mura (S1)	Free
2 August 2025	FW	(Croatia) Jakov Katuša	(Romania) Ceahlăul (R2)	Free
SPL2 & Academy
1 July 2025	DF	(Singapore) Daniyal Lynn Rasor	Free Agent	N.A.
18 July 2025	DF	(Singapore) Syafi Hilman	(Singapore) Young Lions	Free
15 August 2025	DF	(Singapore) (Nigeria) Levi Faris Alfa	(Singapore) Hougang United U21	Free
16 August 2025	DF	(Singapore) Syabil Hisham	(Singapore) SAFSA	Free
17 August 2025	MF	(Portugal) Tiago Martins	(Singapore) Lion City Sailors U21	Season loan
18 August 2025	MF	(Israel) Yanir Ben Eliezer	(Singapore) Hougang United U21	Free
19 August 2025	DF	(Singapore) Wong Ngang Haang	(Singapore) Young Lions	Free
19 August 2025	MF	(Singapore) (Nepal) Rijan Rai	(Singapore) Hougang United U21	Free
19 August 2025	MF	(Singapore) Adly Irfan	(Singapore) Geylang International U21	Free
September 2025	FW	(Singapore) Karthigaya Varmaan	(Singapore)	Free
September 2025	FW	(Singapore) Sashwin Sashi	(Singapore)	Free

Mid-Season

Date (Note: Date of club's announcement, will be either date of club announcement or 1 Jun-2025, the date which the free agent start due to lapse of previous contract)	Position	Player	Transferred from	Ref
First team
14 November 2025	DF	(Singapore) Tajeli Salamat	(Singapore) Geylang International	Free
1 January 2026	FW	(Singapore) Zamani Zamri	N.A.	Free
1 January 2026	DF	(Singapore) Aniq Raushan	(Singapore) Lion City Sailors	Season loan
SPL2 & Academy
1 December 2025	DF	(Singapore) Aqil Dany Jahsh Ruzzman	Free Agent	N.A.
1 January 2026	MF	(Singapore) Lewis Lee Chih Yuan	(Singapore) SAFSA	End of NS
1 January 2026	FW	(Singapore) Irfan Iskandar	(Singapore) Geylang International	Free
1 January 2026	FW	(Singapore) (England) Ilyasin Zayan	(Singapore) Lion City Sailors	Season loan
31 January 2026	GK	(Singapore) Dany Irfan	(Singapore)	Free
31 January 2026	DF	(Singapore) Saf Loqmen	(Singapore)	Free
31 January 2026	DF	(Singapore) Loukas Ng Bo Jun	(Singapore) BG Tampines Rovers U17	Free
31 January 2026	MF	(Australia) (Singapore) Hugh Alexander Lobsey	(Singapore) BG Tampines Rovers U17	Free

=== Out ===
Preseason

Date (Note: Date of club's announcement, will be either date of club announcement or 1 Jun-2025, the date which the free agent start due to lapse of previous contract)	Position	Player	Transferred To	Ref
First team
1 June 2025	GK	(Vietnam) Hồ Tùng Hân	(Vietnam) SHB Da Nang	End of loan
1 June 2025	DF	(Singapore) (Republic of Ireland) Jared Gallagher	(Singapore) BG Tampines Rovers	End of loan
1 June 2025	FW	(Indonesia) Reycredo Beremanda	(Indonesia) Nusantara United FC	End of loan
21 June 2025	MF	(Slovenia) Alen Kozar	(Bosnia and Herzegovina) FK Sloga Doboj	Undisclosed
27 June 2025	DF	(Singapore) Emmeric Ong	(Singapore) Tanjong Pagar United	Free
27 June 2025	DF	(Singapore) Syukri Noorhaizam	(Singapore)	Free
27 June 2025	FW	(Japan) Riku Fukashiro	(Singapore) Geylang International	Free
29 June 2025	FW	(Netherlands) (Suriname) Anton Fase	(Indonesia) PSIM Yogyakarta	Free
30 June 2025	FW	(Japan) Kodai Tanaka	(Indonesia) Persis Solo	Free
8 July 2025	FW	(Singapore) Amiruldin Asraf	(Singapore) Bishan Barx (SFL2)	Free
9 July 2025	DF	(Australia) (South Sudan) Cher Deng	(Australia) Queensland Lions	Free
19 August 2025	MF	(Singapore) Sheikh Faris	(Singapore)	Free
SPL2, U23 & Academy
19 August 2025	GK	(Singapore) Efan Qiszman	(Singapore) Lion City Sailors	Free
19 August 2025	GK	(Singapore) Seth Lee	(Singapore) Lion City Sailors	Free
19 August 2025	DF	(Singapore) Aaryan Fikri	(Singapore) Lion City Sailors	Free
19 August 2025	DF	(Singapore) Raiyan Izdihar	(Singapore) Lion City Sailors	Free
19 August 2025	MF	(Singapore) Jan Tze Soong	(Singapore) Lion City Sailors	Free
19 August 2025	MF	(Singapore) Bryan Khng	(Singapore) Lion City Sailors	Free
19 August 2025	MF	(Singapore) Adam Faisal	(Singapore) Lion City Sailors	Free
19 August 2025	DF	(Singapore) Irfan Mika'il Abdullah	(Singapore)	Free
19 August 2025	FW	(Singapore) Tariq Shahid Akbar	(Singapore)	Free

Mid-season

Date (Note: Date of club's announcement, will be either date of club announcement or 1 Jun-2025, the date which the free agent start due to lapse of previous contract)	Position	Player	Transferred To	Ref
First team
7 January 2026	DF	(Singapore) Abdil Qaiyyim Mutalib	(Singapore) Young Lions	Free
1 January 2026	DF	(Singapore) Wong Ngang Haang	(Singapore) Hougang United	Free
1 January 2026	MF	(Singapore) (Nepal) Rijan Rai	(Singapore) Lion City Sailors	Free
SPL2, U23 & Academy
3 January 2026	DF	(Singapore) (Nigeria) Levi Faris Alfa	(Singapore) Young Lions	Season loan

=== National Services ===
Preseason

Date (Note: Date of club's announcement, else will be 1 Jun-2025, the date which the free agent start due to lapse of previous contract)	Position	Player	Transferred To	Ref
First team
U23
2 January 2024	MF	(Singapore) Lewis Lee Chih Yuan	(Singapore) SAFSA	NS till Jan 2026

=== Retained / Extension / Promoted ===
Date	Position	Player	Ref
First team
5 July 2025	DF	(Singapore) Madhu Mohana	1-year contract till Jun 2026
6 July 2025	GK	(Singapore) Hafiz Ahmad	1-year contract till Jun 2026
6 July 2025	DF	(Singapore) Darren Teh	1-year contract till Jun 2026
7 July 2025	DF	(Singapore) Harith Kanadi	1-year contract till Jun 2026
7 July 2025	DF	(Singapore) Fudhil I’yadh	1-year contract till Jun 2026
7 July 2025	FW	(Singapore) Ignatius Ang	1-year contract till Jun 2026
8 July 2025	GK	(Singapore) Martyn Mun	1-year contract till Jun 2026
8 July 2025	DF	(Singapore) Abdil Qaiyyim Mutalib	1-year contract till Jun 2026
9 July 2025	FW	(Singapore) N.Sakthivelchezhian	1-year contract till Jun 2026
10 July 2025	MF	(Singapore) Elijah Lim Teck Yong	1-year contract till Jun 2026
10 July 2025	MF	(Japan) Masahiro Sugita	1-year contract till Jun 2026

== Friendly ==
=== Pre-season ===
Win Draw Loss

2 August 2025 3	Albirex Niigata (S)	–	Balestier Khalsa	Jurong East
				Stadium: Jurong East Stadium

8 August 2025 4	Balestier Khalsa	3–2	Hougang United	Jalan Besar
				Stadium: Jalan Besar Stadium

=== Mid-season ===
Win Draw Loss

14 November 2025 3	Balestier Khalsa	–	Warwick Knights	Bishan
				Stadium: Bishan Stadium

22 November 2025 3	Balestier Khalsa	–	Jungfrau Punggol	Bishan
				Stadium: Bishan Stadium

== Team statistics ==
=== Appearances and goals ===
As of 15 May 2026

No.	Pos.	Player	SPL		Singapore Cup		Total	
No.	Pos.	Player	Apps.	Goals	Apps.	Goals	Apps.	Goals
2	DF	(Singapore) Darren Teh	18+2	0	6	0	26	0
3	DF	(Singapore) Tajeli Salamat	10+3	1	3+1	0	17	1
4	DF	(Singapore) Syabil Hisham	0	0	0+1	0	1	0
5	DF	(Croatia) Mario Subarić	15+1	1	6	0	23	1
6	DF	(Singapore) Madhu Mohana	18	1	6	0	24	1
7	MF	(Serbia) Lazar Vujanić	20	1	5	1	25	2
9	FW	(Serbia) Bogdan Mandić	21	8	5+1	1	27	9
11	DF	(Singapore) Harith Kanadi	15+1	0	4+1	0	21	0
13	FW	(Singapore) Daniel Goh	11+9	5	3+3	1	26	6
14	MF	(Singapore) Elijah Lim Teck Yong	7+9	2	2+3	0	21	2
16	GK	(Singapore) Martyn Mun	0	0	0	0	0	0
17	FW	(Croatia) Tin Matić	20+1	6	6	5	27	11
18	MF	(Japan) Masahiro Sugita	20	5	6	0	26	5
19	MF	(Portugal) Tiago Martins	1+1	0	0	0	2	0
20	DF	(Singapore) Fudhil I’yadh	5+9	0	1+3	0	18	0
21	GK	(Singapore) Hafiz Ahmad	4+2	0	0	0	6	0
22	FW	(Croatia) Jakov Katuša	17+1	6	4	2	22	8
25	DF	(Singapore) Aniq Raushan	1+2	0	0	0	3	0
26	FW	(Singapore) (England) Ilyasin Zayan	0+5	0	0	0	5	0
30	MF	(Singapore) Ignatius Ang	10+9	2	3+3	1	25	3
32	DF	(Singapore) Syafi Hilman	0+3	0	0	0	3	0
71	GK	(Croatia) Mario Mustapić	17	0	6	0	23	0
74	FW	(Singapore) Ifat Sha'aban	0+11	1	0+5	0	16	1
77	FW	(Singapore) Zamani Zamri	0	0	0	0	0	0
Players who have played this season but had left the club or on loan to other club
23	DF	(Singapore) (Nigeria) Levi Faris Alfa	0	0	0+1	0	1	0
36	DF	(Singapore) Abdil Qaiyyim Mutalib	0	0	0	0	0	0
60	DF	(Singapore) Jeff Lam	0+1	0	0	0	1	0

== Competitions ==
=== Singapore Premier League ===
Win Draw Loss

23 August 2025 1	Albirex Niigata (S) (Japan)	2–2	(Singapore) Balestier Khalsa	Jurong East
	Katsuyuki Ishibashi 31'; Takumi Yokohata 34'; Lee Dong-yeol (yellow card) 26'; Jared Gallagher (yellow card) 49'; Sim Jun Yan (yellow card) 88'	Report	Mario Subarić 8'; Ignatius Ang 82'; Darren Teh (yellow card) 32'	Stadium: Jurong East Stadium; Referee: Jansen Foo; Man of the Match: (Japan) Takumi Yokohata

14 September 2025 2	Balestier Khalsa (Singapore)	0–5	(Singapore) Lion City Sailors	Tampines
		Report	Bailey Wright 27'; Bart Ramselaar 72'; Lennart Thy 82'; Abdul Rasaq Akeem 90'; Maxime Lestienne 90+4'; Diogo Costa (yellow card) 64'	Stadium: Our Tampines Hub (Note: Location changed due to re-turfing of Bishan Stadium); Referee: Andrea Verolino; Man of the Match: (Netherlands) Bart Ramselaar

21 September 2025 3	Young Lions (Singapore)	1–2	(Singapore) Balestier Khalsa	Tampines
	Sergio Mendonça 7' (pen.); Andrew Aw (yellow card) 64'		Masahiro Sugita 14'; Elijah Lim 90+10'; Madhu Mohana (yellow card) 70'; Jakov Katuša (yellow card) 74'	Stadium: Our Tampines Hub (Note: Location changed due to re-turfing of Jalan Besar Stadium); Referee: Taufik Thana; Man of the Match: (Croatia) Mario Mustapić

19 October 2025 4	BG Tampines Rovers (Singapore)	3–3	(Singapore) Balestier Khalsa	Tampines
	Hide Higashikawa 6'; Glenn Kweh 48', 79'; Takeshi Yoshimoto (yellow card) 73'	Report	Masahiro Sugita 18' (yellow card) 90+1'; Madhu Mohana 70'; Tin Matić 90+17' (pen.); Harith Kanadi (yellow card) 36'	Stadium: Our Tampines Hub; Referee: Farhan Mohd; Man of the Match: (Singapore) Glenn Kweh

24 October 2025 5	Balestier Khalsa (Singapore)	2–1	(Singapore) Tanjong Pagar United	Bishan
	Masahiro Sugita 62'; Daniel Goh 80' (yellow card) 90+1'		Bruno Dybal 23'; Kim Li-Kwan (yellow card) 18'; Zenivio (yellow card) 58'; Shodai Nishikawa (yellow card) 68' (yellow-red card) 85'; Youssef Ezzejjari (yellow card) 90+8'	Stadium: Bishan Stadium; Referee: Ahmad A'Qashah; Man of the Match: (Japan) Masahiro Sugita

15 May 2026 6 (Rescheduled)	Geylang International (Singapore)	3–4	(Singapore) Balestier Khalsa	Tampines
	Shuhei Hoshino 29'; Riku Fukashiro 32'; Mario Subarić 89' (o.g.); Nikola Ignjatovic (red card) 72'		Daniel Goh 23'; Tin Matic 55'; Tajeli Salamat 78'; Ignatius Ang 90+4'; Lazar Vujanić (yellow card) 25' (yellow-red card) 66'	Stadium: Our Tampines Hub; Referee: Farhan Mohd; Man of the Match: (Singapore) Tajeli Salamat

18 January 2026 7	Balestier Khalsa (Singapore)	2–3	(Singapore) Hougang United	Bishan
	Bogdan Mandić 5'; Zharfan Rohaizad 8' (o.g.); Mario Subarić (red card) 34'; Tajeli Salamat (yellow card) 55'		Settawut Wongsai 11'; Víctor Blasco 78'; Nabilai Kibunguchy 80'	Stadium: Bishan Stadium; Referee: Zulfiqar Mustaffa; Man of the Match: (Spain) Víctor Blasco

25 January 2026 8	Balestier Khalsa (Singapore)	0–4	(Japan) Albirex Niigata (S)	Bishan
	Madhu Mohana (red card) 34'; Tajeli Salamat (yellow card) 56'	Report	Shingo Nakano 43', 58'; Kim Tae-uk 45+2'; Naoki Yoshioka 82'; Syed Firdaus (yellow card) 5'; Cho Eun-su (yellow card) 56'	Stadium: Bishan Stadium; Referee: Jansen Foo; Man of the Match: (Japan) Shingo Nakano

1 February 2026 9	Lion City Sailors (Singapore)	5–1	(Singapore) Balestier Khalsa	Jalan Besar
	Anderson Lopes 22', 32'; Diogo Costa 27'; Shawal Anuar 37'; Bailey Wright 66'; Lucas Agueiro (yellow card) 69'	Report	Lionel Tan 24' (o.g.); Harith Kanadi (yellow card) 28'; Lazar Vujanić (yellow card) 43'; Daniel Goh (yellow card) 48'	Stadium: Jalan Besar Stadium; Referee: Mazlan Pagira; Man of the Match: (Brazil) Anderson Lopes

7 February 2026 10	Balestier Khalsa (Singapore)	0–3	(Singapore) BG Tampines Rovers	Bishan
	Fudhil I'yadh (yellow card) 37'; Tin Matic (yellow card) 49'; Lazar Vujanic (yellow card) 70'	Report	Shah Shahiran 22'; Hide Higashikawa 50'; Jacob Mahler 71' (yellow card) 45+3'; Trent Buhagiar (yellow card) 89'	Stadium: Bishan Stadium; Referee: Clarence Leow; Man of the Match: (Singapore) Shah Shahiran

13 February 2026 11	Balestier Khalsa (Singapore)	3–1	(Singapore) Young Lions	Bishan
	Bogdan Mandić 36' (pen.); Jakov Katuša 64', 73'; Tin Matic (yellow card) 19'; Lazar Vujanic (yellow card) 20'; Elijah Lim (yellow card) 86'	Report	Sergio Mendonça 70' (yellow card) 20' (penalty missed) 27	Stadium: Bishan Stadium; Referee: Muhd Taqi; Man of the Match: (Croatia) Jakov Katuša

20 February 2026 12	Balestier Khalsa (Singapore)	5–2	(Singapore) Geylang International	Bishan
	Nikola Ignjatovic 10' (o.g.); Jakov Katuša 15'; Bogdan Mandić 23', 29'; Masahiro Sugita 84'		Tin Matic 5' (o.g.); Shuhei Hoshino 45+3'; Nikola Ignjatovic (yellow card) 58'	Stadium: Bishan Stadium; Referee: Mazlan Pagira; Man of the Match: (Serbia) Bogdan Mandić

1 March 2026 13	Tanjong Pagar United (Singapore)	1–4	(Singapore) Balestier Khalsa	Jurong East
	Junior Djile 45+5'; Azim Akbar (yellow card) 68'		Syahadat Masnawi 38' (o.g.); Bogdan Mandić 61', 64'; Lazar Vujanić 79'; Tin Matić (penalty missed) 23'; Mario Subarić (yellow card) 40'	Stadium: Jurong East Stadium; Referee: Khairul Amri; Man of the Match: (Serbia) Bogdan Mandić

9 March 2026 14	Hougang United (Singapore)	1–2	(Singapore) Balestier Khalsa	Bishan
	Hafiz Ahmad 21' (o.g.); Huzaifah Aziz (yellow card) 34'; Ryaan Sanizal (red card) 44'; Saharat Panmarchya (yellow card) 90+4'		Tin Matić 55'; Jakov Katuša 67'; Harith Kanadi (yellow card) 37'; Masahiro Sugita (yellow card) 71'; Lazar Vujanic (yellow card) 82'	Stadium: Bishan Stadium; Referee: Zulfiqar Mustaffa; Man of the Match: (Croatia) Jakov Katuša

15 March 2026 15	Balestier Khalsa (Singapore)	0–3	(Singapore) Lion City Sailors	Bishan
	Harith Kanadi (red card) 85'	Report	Diogo Costa 33'; Lennart Thy 40'; Anderson Lopes 85' (pen.)	Stadium: Bishan Stadium; Referee: Clarence Leow; Man of the Match: (Portugal) Diogo Costa

5 April 2026 16	Young Lions (Singapore)	0–2	(Singapore) Balestier Khalsa	Jalan Besar
	Andrew Aw (yellow card) 45+1'; Ajay Robson (yellow card) 80'		Masahiro Sugita 54'; Daniel Goh 87'; Bogdan Mandić (penalty missed) 28; Darren Teh (yellow card) 64'	Stadium: Jalan Besar Stadium; Referee: Syarqawi Buhari; Man of the Match: (Japan) Masahiro Sugita

13 April 2026 17	Balestier Khalsa (Singapore)	2–1	(Japan) Albirex Niigata (S)	Bishan
	Bogdan Mandić 33'; Naoki Yoshioka 90+4' (o.g.); Mario Subarić (yellow card) 53'; Madhu Mohana (yellow card) 80'	Report	Abdul Rasaq 36'	Stadium: Bishan Stadium; Referee: Jansen Foo; Man of the Match: (Serbia) Bogdan Mandić

17 April 2026 18	BG Tampines Rovers (Singapore)	2–1	(Singapore) Balestier Khalsa	Tampines
	Yuki Kobayashi 48'; Seiga Sumi 80'; Jacob Mahler (yellow card) 63'	Report	Daniel Goh 64'; Mario Subarić (yellow card) 46'; Lazar Vujanić (yellow card) 79'; Tin Matić (yellow card) 89'	Stadium: Our Tampines Hub; Referee: Oswind Suriya; Man of the Match: (Croatia) Mario Mustapić

27 April 2026 19	Balestier Khalsa (Singapore)	0–3	(Singapore) Hougang United	Bishan
	Fudhil I'yadh (yellow card) 21'; Masahiro Sugita (yellow card) 90+1'		Saifullah Akbar 2'; Jaushua Sotirio 4'; Farhan Zulkifli 52'; Ridhuan Barudin (yellow card) 34'	Stadium: Bishan Stadium; Referee: Clarence Leow; Man of the Match: (Singapore) Saifullah Akbar

2 May 2026 20 (Rescheduled)	Geylang International (Singapore)	2–3	(Singapore) Balestier Khalsa	Tampines
	Ryoya Tanigushi 45+2' (yellow card) 36' (red card) 90+5'; Shuhei Hoshino 84'; Vincent Bezecourt (yellow card) 88'		Jakov Katuša 22' (yellow card) 90+6'; Daniel Goh 38'; Elijah Lim 90+1'; Tajeli Salamat (yellow card) 41' (yellow-red card) 90+5'	Stadium: Our Tampines Hub; Referee: Hilmi Fuad; Man of the Match: (Croatia) Jakov Katuša

9 May 2026 21 (Rescheduled)	Balestier Khalsa (Singapore)	6–0	(Singapore) Tanjong Pagar United	Bishan
	Tin Matić 12', 54', 79'; Bogdan Mandić 51'; Jakov Katuša 83'; Ifat Sha'aban 86'; Masahiro Sugita (yellow card) 48'		Jesse Daley (yellow card) 64'	Stadium: Bishan Stadium; Referee: Zulfiqar Mustaffa; Man of the Match: (Croatia) Tin Matić

Pos	Team	Pld	W	D	L	GF	GA	GD	Pts	Qualification or relegation
1	Lion City Sailors (C)	21	16	3	2	70	14	+56	51	Qualification for Champions League Two group stage (Note: Since the winners of the 2025–26 Singapore Cup, Lion City Sailors, qualified for the Champions League Two by league position, the spot reserved for the Singapore Cup winners will pass to the runners-up of the league.)
2	BG Tampines Rovers	21	15	4	2	58	21	+37	49	Qualification for Champions League Two group stage
3	Albirex Niigata (S)	21	15	2	4	47	19	+28	47	
4	Balestier Khalsa	21	11	2	8	44	46	−2	35	
5	Geylang International	21	7	3	11	29	42	−13	24	
6	Hougang United	21	7	0	14	24	41	−17	21	
7	Young Lions (Note: Young Lions cannot qualify for AFC competitions.)	21	2	3	16	15	58	−43	9	
8	Tanjong Pagar United	21	2	1	18	17	63	−46	7	

Updated to match(es) played on 18 May 2026. Source: Singapore Premier League
Rules for classification: 1) points; 2) goal difference; 3) number of goals scored; 4) number of wins
(C) Champions

=== Singapore Cup ===
==== Round 1 ====
2 November 2025 Rd 1 Match 1	Balestier Khalsa (Singapore)	3–0	(Singapore) Tanjong Pagar United	Bishan
	Tin Matić 37'; Jakov Katuša 77'; Daniel Goh 82'; Madhu Mohana (yellow card) 42'; Harith Kanadi (red card) 45+4'; Darren Teh (yellow card) 89'		Sahil Suhaimi (yellow card) 60' (yellow-red card) 62'; Bruno Dybal (yellow card) 89'	Stadium: Bishan Stadium; Referee: Andrea Verolino; Man of the Match: (Croatia) Jakov Katuša

6 November 2025 Rd 1 Match 2	Albirex Niigata (S) (Japan)	3–2	(Singapore) Balestier Khalsa	Jurong East
	Takumi Yokohata 22'; Kim Tae-uk 90+4'; Nicky Melvin Singh 90+8'		Tin Matić 59' (pen.); Jakov Katuša 74'; Fudhil I’yadh (yellow card) 40'; Masahiro Sugita (yellow card) 68'	Stadium: Jurong East Stadium; Referee: Syarqawi Buhari; Man of the Match: (Singapore) (Philippines) Nicky Melvin Singh

30 November 2025 Rd 1 Match 3	Geylang International (Singapore)	3–3	(Singapore) Balestier Khalsa	Tampines
	Riku Fukashiro 83' (yellow card) 64'; Vincent Bezecourt 88' (penalty missed) 68; Ryoya Taniguchi 90+5'; Nizwan Izzairie (yellow card) 1' (yellow-red card) 20'; Nazrul Nazari (yellow card) 43'		Tin Matić 14', 22' (yellow card) 34'; Lazar Vujanic 90+2' (yellow card) 56'; Mario Šubarić (yellow card) 63'; Harith Kanadi (yellow card) 66'	Stadium: Our Tampines Hub; Referee: Ahmad A'Qashah; Man of the Match: (Croatia) Tin Matic

7 December 2025 Rd 1 Match 4	Balestier Khalsa (Singapore)	2–1	(Singapore) Hougang United	Bishan
	Tin Matić 45+1'; Ignatius Ang 54'; Lazar Vujanic (yellow card) 33'; Daniel Goh (yellow card) 78'		Farhan Zulkifli 62' (red card) 90+9'; Settawut Wongsai (yellow card) 36'; Huzaifah Aziz (yellow card) 90+11'	Stadium: Bishan Stadium; Referee: Thaufeek Ahmad; Man of the Match: (Croatia) Tin Matic

==== Semi Final ====
14 December 2025 Semi Final Leg 1	Balestier Khalsa (Singapore)	1–4	(Singapore) Lion City Sailors	Bishan
	Bogdan Mandić 12'		Bailey Wright 26'; Lennart Thy 34'; Shawal Anuar 47'; Anderson Lopes 58'	Stadium: Bishan Stadium; Referee: Andrea Verolino; Man of the Match: (Germany) Lennart Thy

20 December 2025 Semi Final Leg 2	Lion City Sailors (Singapore)	1–0 (5–1 agg.)	(Singapore) Balestier Khalsa	Jalan Besar
	Shawal Anuar 8'; Maxime Lestienne (penalty missed) 72			Stadium: Jalan Besar Stadium; Referee: Muhammad Taqi; Man of the Match: (Singapore) Shawal Anuar

Lion City Sailors won 5–1 on aggregate.

== Competition (SPL2) ==
Win Draw Loss

9 December 2025 1 (Rescheduled)	Balestier Khalsa (Singapore)	0–4	(Singapore) Young Lions	Bishan
	Daniyal Lynn Rasor (red card) 45'; Karthigaya Varmaan (yellow card) 54'		Aqil M. Khusni 36'; Ilyasin Zayan 45'; Garv Sahoo 48', 90'; Iliya Naufal Idris (yellow card) 45'; Zaki Jumlan (yellow card) 65'; Lukyan Tan (yellow card) 83'; Marcus Mosses (yellow card) 85'	Stadium: Bishan Stadium; Referee: Yazid Abdul Latiff

9 September 2025 2	Geylang International (Singapore)	3–1	(Singapore) Balestier Khalsa	Choa Chu Kang
	Adam Irfan 51'; Syafi Suhaimi 58'; Shafeeq Ameer 75'; Nur Ikhsanuddin (yellow card) 32'		Elijah Lim Teck Yong 11'; Yanir Ben Eliezer (yellow card) 32'; Daniyal Lynn Rasor (yellow card) 42'	Stadium: Choa Chu Kang Stadium; Referee: Farhan Mohd

29 September 2025 3	Lion City Sailors (Singapore)	1–1	(Singapore) Balestier Khalsa	Choa Chu Kang
	Ahmad Danial 42'; Faisal Shahril (yellow card) 90'		Ifat Sha'aban 70' (pen.); Adly Irfan (yellow card) 57'; Syafi Hilman (yellow card) 84'	Stadium: Choa Chu Kang Stadium; Referee: Syarqawi Buhari

7 October 2025 4	Balestier Khalsa (Singapore)	0–10	(Japan) Albirex Niigata (S)	Jurong East
	Nor Irfan (yellow card) 88'		Danish Qayyum 1'; Helmi Shahrol 14', 51' (yellow card) 43'; Syed Firdaus 28', 53'; Amy Recha 54', 67' (pen.), 69'; Liska Iskandar 59'; Soshi Kadowaki 83'; Nicky Melvin Singh (yellow card) 85'	Stadium: Jurong East Stadium; Referee: Clarence Leow

15 October 2025 5	BG Tampines Rovers (Singapore)	1–0	(Singapore) Balestier Khalsa	Tampines
	Tallo Ngao 18'; Liam Buckley (yellow card) 59'; Shaddiq Mansor (yellow card) 73'			Stadium: Our Tampines Hub; Referee: Yazid Abdul Latiff

28 October 2025 6	Balestier Khalsa (Singapore)	3–4	(Singapore) Tanjong Pagar United	Bishan
	Ifat Sha'aban 55', 67', 90'; Karthigaya Varmaan (yellow card) 29'		Emilio Estevez 18'; Sahil Suhaimi 24' (yellow card) 90+9'; Fathullah Rahmat 66' (yellow card) 90+9'; Shodai Nishikawa 90'; Aloysius Pang (yellow card) 83'	Stadium: Bishan Stadium; Referee: Khairul Amri

11 November 2025 7	Balestier Khalsa (Singapore)	3–1	(Singapore) Hougang United	Bishan
	Tiago Martins 33', 41'; Karthigaya Varmaan 70'		Syady Sufwan 9'; Adam Ali (yellow card) 81'	Stadium: Bishan Stadium; Referee: Andrea Verolino

17 November 2025 8	Young Lions (Singapore)	3–0	(Singapore) Balestier Khalsa	Bishan
	Jovan Ang 18' (yellow card) 47'; Nicolas Benninger 79' (yellow card) 82'; Yazid Rais 90'; Idzham Eszuan (yellow card) 90'		Karthigaya Varmaan (yellow card) 57'; Adly Irfan (yellow card) 74'	Stadium: Bishan Stadium; Referee: Taufik Thana

3 December 2025 9	Hougang United (Singapore)	2–3	(Singapore) Balestier Khalsa	Bishan
	Yuma Suwa 80', 90'; Rishon Soroya (yellow card) 90'		Ifat Sha'aban 25', 65'; Harris Ilhan 69'; Karthigaya Varmaan (yellow card) 22'; Firdaus Roslan (yellow card) 82'	Stadium: Bishan Stadium; Referee: Taufik Thana

15 December 2025 10	Balestier Khalsa (Singapore)	0–5	(Singapore) Lion City Sailors	Bishan
	Syabil Hisham (yellow card) 56'		Ahmad Danial 19'; Lin Ze hao 58' (o.g.); Adam Faisal 85'; Ikmal Hazlan 89'; Aiman Zayani 90+2'; Aaryan Fikri (yellow card) 36'	Stadium: Bishan Stadium; Referee: Muhammad Noor Adzdzeeq

6 January 2026 11	Albirex Niigata (S) (Japan)	2–0	(Singapore) Balestier Khalsa	Jurong East
	Ren Nishimura 26'; Shakthi Vinayagavijayan 90'; Komei Iida (yellow card) 50'		Zamani Zamri (yellow card) 40'; Fudhil I'yadh (yellow card) 86'; Ifat Sha'aban (yellow card) 90'	Stadium: Jurong East Stadium; Referee: Noor Adzdzeeq

14 January 2026 12	Balestier Khalsa (Singapore)	2–1	(Singapore) BG Tampines Rovers	Bishan
	Karthigaya Varmaan 22'; Ifat Sha'aban 84'; Zamani Zamri (yellow card) 53'; Irfan Iskandar (yellow card) 86'; Martyn Mun (yellow card) 90'		Lim Zheng Wu 37'	Stadium: Bishan Stadium; Referee: Faris Abdul Rahman

20 January 2026 13	Tanjong Pagar United (Singapore)	0–3; Awarded (Note: The match, originally won by Tanjong Pagar 2–0, was forfeited by Tanjong Pagar and awarded 3–0 to Balestier Khalsa, as Tanjong Pagar fielded less than 4 U23 Singaporeans)	(Singapore) Balestier Khalsa	Jurong East
	Syabil Hisham 27' (o.g.); Sahil Suhaimi 45'; Shodai Nishikawa (yellow card) 34' (yellow-red card); Samuel Pillai (yellow card) 36'; Azim Akbar (yellow card) 52'		Syabil Hisham (yellow card) 62'; Fudhil I'yadh (yellow card) 85' (yellow-red card); Ifat Sha'aban (yellow card) 90+1'	Stadium: Jurong East Stadium; Referee: Mazlan Pagira

27 January 2026 14	Balestier Khalsa (Singapore)	0–2	(Singapore) Geylang International	Tampines
	Larry Lim (yellow card) 58'; Zamani Zamri (yellow card) 65'		Timothy Cheng 45'; Pathyn Banesh 90'; Gareth Low (yellow card) 69'	Stadium: Our Tampines Hub; Referee: Noor Adzdzeeq

3 February 2026 15	Balestier Khalsa (Singapore)	0–2	(Singapore) Young Lions	Jalan Besar
	Saf Loqmen (yellow card) 33'; Irfan Iskandar (yellow card) 45' (yellow-red card) 82'; Aqil Dany (yellow card) 86'; Karthigaya Varmaan (yellow card) 90'		Kian Ghadessy 79' (pen.), 90'; Ryan Vishal (yellow card) 65' (yellow-red card) 72'; Ajay Robson (yellow card) 67' (yellow-red card) 69'	Stadium: Jalan Besar Stadium; Referee: Khairul Amri

24 February 2026 16	Balestier Khalsa (Singapore)	1–1	(Singapore) Hougang United	Bishan
	Hugh Alexander Lobsey 88'; Dany Irfan (yellow card) 55'; Syafi Hilman (yellow card) 60'; Aniq Raushan (yellow card) 82'		Saharat Panmarchya 54'; Parinya Nusong (yellow card) 43'; Chun Wei Woo (yellow card) 82'; Aryan Boon (yellow card) 85'; Syady Sufwan (yellow card) 87'	Stadium: Bishan Stadium; Referee: Yazid Abdul Latiff

17 March 2026 17	Lion City Sailors (Singapore)	1–4	(Singapore) Balestier Khalsa	Bishan
	Adam Faisal 13'; Akmal Azman (yellow card) 45'		Irfan Iskandar 8', 27' (yellow card) 38'; Yanir Ben Eliezer 32'; Aqil Dany 75'; Syabil Hisham (yellow card) 14'; Ifat Sha'aban (yellow card) 62'	Stadium: Bishan Stadium; Referee: Khairul Amri

31 March 2026 18	Balestier Khalsa (Singapore)	0–1	(Japan) Albirex Niigata (S)	Bishan
	Syafi Hilman (yellow card) 60'		Soshi Kadowaki 75'; Aqil Zafri (yellow card) 35'; Jaden Heng (yellow card) 45'; Nicky Melvin Singh (yellow card) 52'; Syed Firdaus Hassan (yellow card) 53'	Stadium: Bishan Stadium; Referee: Faris Abdul Rahman

7 April 2026 19	BG Tampines Rovers (Singapore)	5–2	(Singapore) Balestier Khalsa	Tampines
	Ong Yu En 23' (yellow card) 45': Anton Yen 30'; Zikos Chua 33', 65'; Zeeshan Iskandar 75'; Lim Zheng Wu (yellow card) 35'		Kegan Phang 15' (o.g.); Ilyasin Zayan 41'; Aqil Dany (yellow card) 20'; Syabil Hisham (yellow card) 35'; Irfan Mika'il (yellow card) 43'	Stadium: Our Tampines Hub; Referee: Mazlan Pagira

14 April 2026 20	Balestier Khalsa (Singapore)	1–1	(Singapore) Tanjong Pagar United	Bishan
	Hugh Alexander Lobsey 11' (yellow card) 45'; Dany Irfan (yellow card) 81'		Sahil Suhaimi 13'; Jesse Daley (yellow card) 41'; Samuel Pillai (yellow card) 90+1'	Stadium: Bishan Stadium

21 April 2026 21	Geylang International (Singapore)	6–1	(Singapore) Balestier Khalsa	Bishan
	Abdusukur Abduryim 26', 70'; Timothy Cheng 31'; Ryu Hardy 35' (yellow card) 64'; Vedant Raj 43', 45'; Aniq Matin (yellow card) 49'; Nizwan Izzairie (red card) 90+3'		Ifat Sha'aban 75'; Karthigaya Varmaan (yellow card) 90'; Yanir Ben Eliezer (red card) 90+3'	Stadium: Bishan Stadium; Referee: Muhammad Zulfiqar

Pos	Team	Pld	W	D	L	GF	GA	GD	Pts	Qualification or relegation
1	Albirex Niigata (S) II	21	14	1	6	50	23	+27	43	Inaugural Champion
2	Young Lions B	21	13	1	7	52	31	+21	40	
3	BG Tampines Rovers II	21	12	2	7	46	30	+16	38	
4	Geylang International II	21	9	4	8	36	38	−2	31	
5	Tanjong Pagar United II	21	9	3	9	34	43	−9	30	
6	Lion City Sailors II	21	7	2	12	35	41	−6	23	
7	Hougang United II	21	5	4	12	28	43	−15	19	
8	Balestier Khalsa II	21	5	3	13	25	57	−32	18	

First match(es) will be played: 7 May 2026. Source: Singapore Premier League
Rules for classification: 1) points; 2) goal difference; 3) number of goals scored; 4) number of wins
