= Mario Šubarić =

Croatian footballer

Personal information
- Date of birth: 22 February 2000 (age 26)
- Place of birth: Našice, Croatia
- Height: 1.86 m (6 ft 1 in)
- Position: Defender

Team information
- Current team: Balestier Khalsa
- Number: 5

Youth career
- 2009–2012: Croatia Velimirovac
- 2012–2013: NAŠK
- 2013–2013: Hypo Limac Osijek
- 2013–2014: Osijek
- 2014–2018: SC Freiburg
- 2018–2019: Karlsruher SC

Senior career*
Years	Team	Apps	(Gls)
2019–2021	Greuther Fürth II	19	(0)
2021–2023	FC Augsburg II	55	(2)
2023–2025	Aluminij	41	(0)
2025–	Balestier Khalsa	17	(1)
- * Club domestic league appearances and goals as of 15 May 2026

Mario Šubarić (born 22 February 2000) is a Croatian professional footballer who plays as a defender for Singapore Premier League club Balestier Khalsa.

== Club career ==
=== Aluminij ===
Mario Subarić signed for Aluminij in August 2023.

=== Balestier Khalsa ===
Subarić signed for Singapore Premier League club Balestier Khalsa on 13 July 2025, becoming the season's first new signing.

== Career statistics ==
=== Club ===
As of 15 May 2026.

Club	Season	League			Cup		Continental		Other		Total	
Club	Season	Division	Apps	Goals	Apps	Goals	Apps	Goals	Apps	Goals	Apps	Goals
SpVgg Greuther Fürth II	2020–21	Regionalliga	19	0	3	0	0	0	0	0	22	0
SpVgg Greuther Fürth II	Total		19	0	3	0	0	0	0	0	22	0
FC Augsburg II	2021–22	Regionalliga	26	2	0	0	0	0	0	0	26	2
FC Augsburg II	2022–23	Regionalliga	29	0	0	0	0	0	0	0	29	0
FC Augsburg II	Total		55	2	0	0	0	0	0	0	55	2
NK Aluminij	2023–24	Slovenian PrvaLiga	23	0	0	0	0	0	0	0	23	0
NK Aluminij	2024–25	Slovenian Second League	18	0	1	0	0	0	0	0	19	0
NK Aluminij	Total		41	0	1	0	0	0	0	0	42	0
Balestier Khalsa	2025–26	Singapore Premier League	17	1	6	0	0	0	0	0	23	1
Balestier Khalsa	Total		17	1	6	0	0	0	0	0	23	1
Career total			132	3	10	0	0	0	0	0	142	3
