= Mario Mustapić =

Croatian footballer

Personal information
- Date of birth: 22 October 1999 (age 27)
- Place of birth: Zagreb, Croatia
- Height: 1.87 m (6 ft 1 1/2 in)
- Position: Goalkeeper

Team information
- Current team: Balestier Khalsa
- Number: 71

Youth career
- 2015: Maksimir
- 2015: Sesvete
- 2015–2017: Dubrava

Senior career*
Years	Team	Apps	(Gls)
2017–2021	Dubrava	49	(0)
2021–2022	Rudeš	25	(0)
2023	Kapaz	9	(0)
2023–2025	Dubrava	28	(0)
2025	Mura	0	(0)
2025–	Balestier Khalsa	24	(0)
- * Club domestic league appearances and goals as of 21 November 2026

Mario Mustapić (born 22 October 1999), is a Croatian professional footballer who plays as a goalkeeper for Singapore Premier League club Balestier Khalsa.

== Club career ==
=== Dubrava ===
On 27 February 2017, Mustapić was promoted to Dubrava senior squad. He make his debut for the club on 18 August 2019 in a 2–0 lost to Croatia Zmijavci.

=== Rudeš ===
On 8 July 2021, Mustapić moved to Rudeš. He make his debut against his former club in a 2–2 draw on 14 August. Mustapić make a total of 26 appearances for the club before being release the following year.

=== Kapaz ===
After seven months without a club, Mustapić signed for Azerbaijan Premier League club Kapaz on 11 January 2023. He make his debut in a 2–2 draw against Gabala on 24 January.

=== Return to Dubrava ===
On 17 August 2023, Mustapić returned to his former club Dubrava.

=== Mura ===
Mustapić signed for Slovenian PrvaLiga club Mura on 16 January 2025.

=== Balestier Khalsa ===
Subarić signed for Singapore Premier League club Balestier Khalsa on 26 July 2025, becoming the first foreign goalkeeper for the team.

== Career statistics ==
=== Club ===
As of 21 November 2026.

Club	Season	League			Cup		Continental		Other		Total	
Club	Season	Division	Apps	Goals	Apps	Goals	Apps	Goals	Apps	Goals	Apps	Goals
NK Dubrava	2019–20	Croatian Second Football League	19	0	0	0	0	0	0	0	19	0
NK Dubrava	2020–21	Croatian Second Football League	30	0	0	0	0	0	0	0	30	0
NK Dubrava	Total		49	0	0	0	0	0	0	0	49	0
NK Rudeš	2021–22	Croatian Second Football League	25	0	1	0	0	0	0	0	26	0
NK Rudeš	Total		25	0	1	0	0	0	0	0	26	0
Kapaz PFK	2022–23	Azerbaijan Premier League	9	0	0	0	0	0	0	0	9	0
Kapaz PFK	Total		9	0	0	0	0	0	0	0	9	0
NK Dubrava	2023–24	First Football League (Croatia)	12	0	0	0	0	0	0	0	12	0
NK Dubrava	2024–25	First Football League (Croatia)	16	0	0	0	0	0	0	0	16	0
NK Dubrava	Total		28	0	0	0	0	0	0	0	28	0
NŠ Mura	2024–25	Slovenian PrvaLiga	0	0	0	0	0	0	0	0	0	0
NŠ Mura	Total		0	0	0	0	0	0	0	0	0	0
Balestier Khalsa	2025–26	Singapore Premier League	17	0	6	0	0	0	0	0	23	0
Balestier Khalsa	2026–27	Singapore Premier League	7	0	0	0	0	0	0	0	7	0
Balestier Khalsa	Total		24	0	6	0	0	0	0	0	30	0
Career total			135	0	7	0	0	0	0	0	142	0
